= 2010 Cruzeiro EC season =

Cruzeiro
2010 season
- Chairman: Zezé Perrella
- Manager: Adilson Batista (until 3 June 2010); Cuca
- Série A: 2nd
- Campeonato Mineiro: Semi-finals
- Copa Libertadores: Quarter-finals
- Top goalscorer: League: Walter Montillo and Wellington Paulista (7); All: Thiago Ribeiro (21)
- Highest home attendance: 48,602 (v São Paulo in the Copa Libertadores)
- Lowest home attendance: 2,415 (v Uberaba in the Campeonato Mineiro)
- Average home league attendance: 16,158

The 2010 season is Cruzeiro's eighty-ninth season in existence and the club's fortieth consecutive season in the top flight of Brazilian football.

== Squad ==
- As of 19 June 2010.

Note: Flags indicate national team as defined under FIFA eligibility rules; some limited exceptions apply. Players may hold more than one non-FIFA nationality.

| No. | Pos. | Nation | Player |
|---|---|---|---|
| — | GK | BRA | Fábio (captain) |
| — | GK | BRA | Rafael |
| — | GK | BRA | Flávio |
| — | GK | BRA | Gabriel |
| — | DF | BRA | Jonathan |
| — | DF | BRA | Rômulo |
| — | DF | BRA | Gil |
| — | DF | BRA | Leonardo Silva (vice-captain) |
| — | DF | BRA | Edcarlos |
| — | DF | BRA | Cláudio Caçapa |
| — | DF | BRA | Léo |
| — | DF | BRA | Diego Renan |
| — | DF | BRA | Pablo |
| — | DF | BRA | Sylvinho |
| — | MF | BRA | Fabinho |
| — | MF | BRA | Henrique |

| No. | Pos. | Nation | Player |
|---|---|---|---|
| — | MF | BRA | Fabrício |
| — | MF | BRA | Elicarlos |
| — | MF | BRA | Everton |
| — | MF | BRA | Marquinhos Paraná |
| — | MF | ARG | Sebastián Prediguer |
| — | MF | BRA | Pedro Ken |
| — | MF | BRA | Roger |
| — | MF | ARG | Walter Montillo |
| — | MF | BRA | Gilberto |
| — | FW | BRA | Thiago Ribeiro |
| — | FW | BRA | Wellington Paulista |
| — | FW | BRA | Robert |
| — | FW | BRA | Wallyson |
| — | FW | ARG | Ernesto Farías |

Professional players able to play in the junior team

Note: Flags indicate national team as defined under FIFA eligibility rules; some limited exceptions apply. Players may hold more than one non-FIFA nationality.

| No. / Pos. / Nation / Player; — / GK / BRA / Gabriel | No. / Pos. / Nation / Player; — / DF / BRA / Diego Renan |

Junior players with first team experience

Note: Flags indicate national team as defined under FIFA eligibility rules; some limited exceptions apply. Players may hold more than one non-FIFA nationality.

| No. | Pos. | Nation | Player |
|---|---|---|---|
| — | DF | BRA | Neguete |
| — | DF | BRA | Vinícius |
| — | MF | BRA | Anderson Uchoa |

| No. | Pos. | Nation | Player |
|---|---|---|---|
| — | MF | BRA | Marquinhos |
| — | FW | BRA | Maranhão |
| — | FW | BRA | Sebá |

Out on loan: Note: Flags indicate national team as defined under FIFA eligibility rules; some limited exceptions apply. Players may hold more than one non-FIFA nationality.

| No. | Pos. | Nation | Player |
|---|---|---|---|
| — | DF | BRA | Marcos (loan to Avaí) |
| — | DF | BRA | Wellington (loan to Atlético Goianiense) |
| — | DF | BRA | Léo Fortunato (loan to Braga) |
| — | DF | BRA | Luizão (loan to Avaí) |
| — | MF | BRA | Bernardo (loan to Goiás) |
| — | MF | BRA | Camilo (loan to Ceará) |

| No. | Pos. | Nation | Player |
|---|---|---|---|
| — | MF | BRA | Jones Carioca (loan to Goiás) |
| — | FW | BRA | Eliandro (loan to Sport) |
| — | FW | BRA | Anderson Lessa (loan to Náutico) |
| — | FW | BRA | Kieza (loan to Ponte Preta) |
| — | FW | BRA | Fabinho (loan to Al Arabi) |

=== First-team staff ===
| Position | Name | Nationality |
|---|---|---|
| Coach | Cuca | Brazilian |
| Assistant coach | Celso Roth | Brazilian |
| Coach Suffes | Humberto Ferreira | Brazilian |
| Goalkeeping coach | Robertinho | Brazilian |
| Fitness coaches | Flavio de Oliveira | Brazilian |
| Fitness coaches | Quintiliano Lemos | Brazilian |
| Fitness coaches | Eduardo Freitas | Brazilian |
| Physiologists | Eduardo Pimenta | Brazilian |
| Physiologists | Rodrigo Morandi | Brazilian |
| Physiotherapists | André Rocha | Brazilian |
| Physiotherapists | Charles Costa | Brazilian |
| Physiotherapists | Ronner Bolognani | Brazilian |
| Physiotherapists | João Salomão | Brazilian |
| Doctors | Sérgio Freire Júnior | Brazilian |
| Doctors | Walace Espada | Brazilian |
| Doctors | Leonardo Corradi | Brazilian |
| Masseurs | Barjão | Brazilian |
| Masseurs | Edmar Antônio Silva | Brazilian |
| Masseurs | Hélio Gomes | Brazilian |

== Competitions ==
=== Overview ===
| Competition | First match | Last match | Starting round | Final position | Record | | | | | | | |
| Competition | First match | Last match | Starting round | Final position | Pld | W | D | L | GF | GA | GD | Win % |
|---|---|---|---|---|---|---|---|---|---|---|---|---|
| Série A | 9 May 2010 | 5 December 2010 | Matchday 1 | Runners-up | 38 | 20 | 9 | 9 | 53 | 38 | +15 | 52.63 |
| Campeonato Mineiro | 20 January 2010 | 18 April 2010 | Matchday 1 | Semifinals | 15 | 9 | 2 | 4 | 35 | 20 | +15 | 60.00 |
| Copa Libertadores | 10 February 2010 | 19 May 2010 | First stage | Quarterfinals | 12 | 6 | 3 | 3 | 26 | 12 | +14 | 50.00 |
| Total | | | | | 65 | 35 | 14 | 16 | 114 | 70 | +44 | 53.85 |

Source: Competitions

=== Friendlies ===
| 17 March | Cruzeiro (Brazil) | 0–0 | South Africa | Belo Horizonte |
| 21:50 (UTC-3) | | (Report) (pt) | | Stadium: Estádio Governador Magalhães Pinto (Mineirão); Attendance: 13,496; Referee: Alício Pena Júnior (Brazil) |

| 13 June | New England Revolution (United States) | 0–3 | (Brazil) Cruzeiro | Foxborough, Massachusetts, United States |
| 19:00 (UTC-4) | | (Report) (pt) | Wellington Paulista 24', 48', 81' | Stadium: Gillette Stadium; Attendance: 12,160; Referee: Chris Penson (USA) |

| 18 June | New York Red Bulls (United States) | 2–4 | (Brazil) Cruzeiro | Harrison, New Jersey, United States |
| 20:00 (UTC-4) | Ángel 32'; Chinn 77' | (Report) (pt) | Thiago Ribeiro 7', 51'; Cláudio Caçapa 46'; Wellington Paulista 35' | Stadium: Red Bull Arena; Attendance: 7,680; Referee: Geoff Gamble (CAN) |

=== Campeonato Mineiro ===
==== Standings ====
| Pos | Team | Pld | W | D | L | GF | GA | GD | Pts | Qualification or relegation |
|---|---|---|---|---|---|---|---|---|---|---|
| 1 | Cruzeiro (A) | 11 | 8 | 0 | 3 | 29 | 15 | +14 | 24 | Advanced to the final phase |
| 2 | Democrata (A) | 11 | 7 | 2 | 2 | 22 | 13 | +9 | 23 | Advanced to the final phase |
| 3 | Atlético Mineiro (A) | 11 | 6 | 4 | 1 | 29 | 14 | +15 | 22 | Advanced to the final phase |
| 4 | Tupi (A) | 11 | 7 | 0 | 4 | 21 | 14 | +7 | 21 | Advanced to the final phase |
| 5 | Ipatinga (A) | 11 | 6 | 3 | 2 | 21 | 11 | +10 | 21 | Advanced to the final phase |

Rules for classification: 1) points; 2) goal difference; 3) number of goals scored.
(A) Advance to a further round

==== Matches ====
| 20 January 1 | Cruzeiro | 6–0 | Uberlândia | Belo Horizonte |
| 21:50 (UTC-2) | Thiago Ribeiro 30'; Kléber 45+1', 62' (pen.), 83'; Cláudio Caçapa 67'; Diego Renan 84' | (Report) (pt) | | Stadium: Estádio Governador Magalhães Pinto (Mineirão); Attendance: 13,267; Referee: Renato Cardoso Conceição |

| 30 January 2 | Ipatinga | 3–0 | Cruzeiro | Belo Horizonte |
| 17:00 (UTC-2) | Thiago Matias 23' (pen.); Francismar 40'; Luizinho 49' | (Report) (pt) | | Stadium: Estádio Governador Magalhães Pinto (Mineirão); Attendance: 6,990; Referee: Ricardo Marques Ribeiro |

| 6 February 3 | Cruzeiro | 4–2 | Villa Nova | Belo Horizonte |
| 17:00 (UTC-2) | Wellington Paulista 6'; Bernardo 28'; Thiago Ribeiro 64'; Jonathan 70' | (Report) (pt) | Marinho 35'; Warley 88' | Stadium: Estádio Governador Magalhães Pinto (Mineirão); Attendance: 8,960; Referee: Cleisson Veloso Pereira |

| 13 February 4 | Caldense | 0–2 | Cruzeiro | Poços de Caldas |
| 16:00 (UTC-2) | | (Report) (pt) | Wellington Paulista 4'; Gilberto 54' (pen.) | Stadium: Estádio Dr. Ronaldo Junqueira (Ronaldão); Referee: Emerson de Almeida Ferreira |

| 20 February 6 | Atlético Mineiro | 1–3 | Cruzeiro | Belo Horizonte |
| 17:00 (UTC-2) | Campos 30' | (Report) (pt) | Gil 22'; Leonardo Silva 82'; Roger 88' | Stadium: Estádio Governador Magalhães Pinto (Mineirão); Attendance: 41,591; Referee: Renato Cardoso Conceição |

| 27 February 7 | Ituiutaba | 0–1 | Cruzeiro | Ituiutaba |
| 17:00 (UTC-3) | | (Report) (pt) | Fabinho 89' | Stadium: Estádio da Fazendinha; Attendance: 1,800; Referee: Luiz Martins Dias Lopes |

| 3 March 5 | Cruzeiro | 5–0 | Uberaba | Belo Horizonte |
| 21:50 (UTC-3) | Eliandro 22'; Bernardo 67'; Thiago Ribeiro 69', 76'; Anderson Lessa 78' | (Report) (pt) | | Stadium: Estádio Governador Magalhães Pinto (Mineirão); Attendance: 2,415; Referee: Cleisson Veloso Pereira |

| 7 March 8 | Tupi | 3–2 | Cruzeiro | Juiz de Fora |
| 17:00 (UTC-3) | Ademílson 45'; Fabrício Soares 47'; Gedeon 80' | (Report) (pt) | Anderson Lessa 40'; Pedro Ken 90+1' | Stadium: Estádio Municipal Radialista Mário Helênio; Attendance: 7,844; Referee: Alício Pena Júnior |

| 14 March 9 | Cruzeiro | 3–2 | América-MG | Belo Horizonte |
| 17:00 (UTC-3) | Wellington Paulista 45'; Kieza 68'; Fabinho 85' | (Report) (pt) | Leandro Ferreira 58'; Fábio Júnior 90' | Stadium: Estádio Governador Magalhães Pinto (Mineirão); Attendance: 12,111; Referee: Cleisson Veloso Pereira |

| 20 March 10 | Cruzeiro | 2–1 | América-TO | Belo Horizonte |
| 17:00 (UTC-3) | Roger 59'; Kléber 80' | (Report) (pt) | Chrys 26' | Stadium: Estádio Governador Magalhães Pinto (Mineirão); Attendance: 7,671; Referee: Joel Tolentino Damata Júnior |

| 28 March 11 | Democrata | 3–1 | Cruzeiro | Governador Valadares |
| 16:00 (UTC-3) | Alex Santos 46'; Wanderson 61'; Celinho 83' | (Report) (pt) | Kieza 5' | Stadium: Estádio José Mammoud Abbas (Mamudão); Referee: Alício Pena Júnior |

=== Quarterfinals ===
| 3 April First leg | Cruzeiro | 2–2 | Uberaba | Belo Horizonte |
| 18:30 (UTC-3) | Kléber 28' (pen.); Leonardo Silva 75' | (Report) (pt) | Thiago Marín 13'; Douglas 58' | Stadium: Estádio Governador Magalhães Pinto (Mineirão); Attendance: 11,618; Referee: Renato Cardoso Conceição |

| 7 April Second leg | Uberaba | 0–3 (2–5 agg.) | Cruzeiro | Uberaba |
| Wednesday, 21:50 (UTC-3) | | (Report) (pt) | Leonardo Silva 6'; Thiago Ribeiro 45'; Gilberto 62' | Stadium: Estádio João Guido (Uberabão); Referee: Alício Pena Júnior |

=== Semifinals ===
| 11 April First leg | Ipatinga | 0–0 | Cruzeiro | Ipatinga |
| 16:00 (UTC-3) | | (Report) (pt) | | Stadium: Estádio Epaminondas Mendes Brito (Ipatingão); Attendance: 11,000; Referee: Emerson de Almeida Ferreira |

| 18 April Second leg | Cruzeiro | 1–3 (1–3 agg.) | Ipatinga | Belo Horizonte |
| 16:00 (UTC-3) | Wellington Paulista 89' (pen.) | (Report) (pt) | Danilo Dias 61', 65'; Alessandro 75' | Stadium: Estádio Governador Magalhães Pinto (Mineirão); Attendance: 17,396; Referee: Ricardo Marques Ribeiro |

=== Campeonato Brasileiro ===
==== Standings ====
| Pos | Team | Pld | W | D | L | GF | GA | GD | Pts | Qualification or relegation |
|---|---|---|---|---|---|---|---|---|---|---|
| 1 | Fluminense | 38 | 20 | 11 | 7 | 62 | 36 | +26 | 71 | 2011 Copa Libertadores Second Stage |
| 2 | Cruzeiro | 38 | 20 | 9 | 9 | 53 | 38 | +15 | 69 | 2011 Copa Libertadores Second Stage |
| 3 | Corinthians | 38 | 19 | 11 | 8 | 65 | 41 | +24 | 68 | 2011 Copa Libertadores First Stage |
| 4 | Grêmio | 38 | 17 | 12 | 9 | 68 | 43 | +25 | 63 | 2011 Copa Libertadores First Stage |
| 5 | Atlético Paranaense | 38 | 17 | 9 | 12 | 43 | 45 | −2 | 60 | 2011 Copa Sudamericana Second Stage |

Rules for classification: 1st points; 2nd wins; 3rd goal difference; 4th goals scored; 5th head-to-head results; 6th least red cards received; 7th least yellow cards received; 8th draw

==== Matches ====
| 9 May 1 | Internacional | 1–2 | Cruzeiro | Porto Alegre |
| 16:00 (UTC-3) | Taison 7' | Report | Kléber 4' (pen.), 36' | Stadium: Estádio José Pinheiro Borda (Beira-Rio); Referee: Wilson Luiz Seneme |

| 16 May 2 | Cruzeiro | 2–2 | Avaí | Belo Horizonte |
| 18:30 (UTC-3) | Wellington Paulista 52', 62' (pen.) | Report | Pará 25'; Roberto 45' | Stadium: Estádio Governador Magalhães Pinto (Mineirão); Attendance: 8,115; Referee: Leonardo Gaciba Da Silva |

| 23 May 3 | Guarani | 2–2 | Cruzeiro | Campinas |
| 18:30 (UTC-3) | Roger 11', 31' | Report | Gil 52'; Guerrón 75' | Stadium: Estádio Brinco de Ouro da Princesa; Attendance: 8,689; Referee: Leandro Pedro Vuaden |

| 26 May 4 | Cruzeiro | 1–0 | Botafogo | Belo Horizonte |
| 21:50 (UTC-3) | Thiago Ribeiro 18' | Report | | Stadium: Estádio Governador Magalhães Pinto (Mineirão); Attendance: 8,501; Referee: Jailson Macêdo Freitas |

| 30 May 5 | Ceará | 1–0 | Cruzeiro | Fortaleza |
| 18:30 (UTC-3) | Lopes 39' | Report | | Stadium: Estádio Governador Plácido Aderaldo Castelo (Castelão); Attendance: 19,694; Referee: Pericles Bassols Pegado Cortez |

| 2 June 6 | Cruzeiro | 0–0 | Santos | Belo Horizonte |
| 21:50 (UTC-3) | | Report | | Stadium: Estádio Governador Magalhães Pinto (Mineirão); Attendance: 15,708; Referee: Wilton Pereira Sampaio |

| 6 June 7 | Atlético Goianiense | 2–1 | Cruzeiro | Goiânia |
| 18:30 (UTC-3) | Rodrigo Tiuí 29'; Pedro Paulo 84' | Report | Wellington Paulista 42' | Stadium: Estádio do Governo do Estado de Goiás (Serra Dourada); Attendance: 3,419; Referee: Guilherme Ceretta De Lima |

| 14 July 8 | Atlético Paranaense | 0–2 | Cruzeiro | Curitiba |
| 19:30 (UTC-3) | | Report | Wellington Paulista 45'; Robert 86' | Stadium: Estádio Joaquim Américo Guimarães (Arena da Baixada); Attendance: 13,952; Referee: Wilson Luiz Seneme |

| 18 July 9 | Cruzeiro | 1–0 | Goiás | Sete Lagoas |
| 18:30 (UTC-3) | Gilberto 11' | Report | | Stadium: Estádio Joaquim Henrique Nogueira (Arena da Jacaré); Attendance: 3,579; Referee: Sálvio Spínola Fagundes |

| 22 July 10 | Fluminense | 1–0 | Cruzeiro | Rio de Janeiro |
| 21:00 (UTC-3) | Leandro Euzebio 54' | Report | | Stadium: Estádio Jornalista Mário Filho (Maracanã); Attendance: 34,008; Referee: Wilton Pereira Sampaio |

| 25 July 11 | Cruzeiro | 2–2 | Grêmio | Sete Lagoas |
| 16:00 (UTC-3) | Henrique 46', 85' | Report | Borges 45'; Jonas 79' | Stadium: Estádio Joaquim Henrique Nogueira (Arena da Jacaré); Attendance: 9,672; Referee: Marcelo de Lima Henrique |

| 1 August 12 | Atlético Mineiro | 0–1 | Cruzeiro | Sete Lagoas |
| 18:30 (UTC-3) | | Report | Wellington Paulista 32' | Stadium: Estádio Joaquim Henrique Nogueira (Arena da Jacaré); Attendance: 12,340; Referee: Wilson Luiz Seneme |

| 8 August 13 | Cruzeiro | 0–0 | Grêmio Prudente | Ipatinga |
| 18:30 (UTC-3) | | Report | | Stadium: Estádio Municipal Epaminondas Mendes Brito (Ipatingão); Attendance: 10,209; Referee: Andre Luiz de Freitas Castro |

| 15 August 14 | São Paulo | 2–2 | Cruzeiro | São Paulo |
| 16:00 (UTC-3) | Casemiro 41'; Ricardo Oliveira 90' | Report | Wellington Paulista 67'; Thiago Ribeiro 83' | Stadium: Estádio Cícero Pompeu de Toledo (Morumbi); Attendance: 12,338; Referee: Leandro Pedro Vuaden |

| 22 August 15 | Cruzeiro | 0–1 | Vitória | Ipatinga |
| 18:30 (UTC-3) | | Report | Júnior 53' | Stadium: Estádio Municipal Epaminondas Mendes Brito (Ipatingão); Attendance: 10,195; Referee: Francisco Carlos Nascimento |

| 25 August 16 | Cruzeiro | 1–0 | Corinthians | Uberlândia |
| 22:00 (UTC-3) | Montillo 3' | Report | | Stadium: Estádio Municipal João Havelange (Parque do Sabiá); Attendance: 37,377; Referee: Sandro Meira Ricci |

| 28 August 17 | Vasco da Gama | 1–1 | Cruzeiro | Rio de Janeiro |
| 18:30 (UTC-3) | Zé Roberto 44' | Report | Fernando 45' (o.g.) | Stadium: Estádio Vasco da Gama (São Januário); Attendance: 16,518; Referee: Luiz Flavio De Oliveira |

| 1 September 18 | Cruzeiro | 1–0 | Flamengo | Uberlândia |
| 22:00 (UTC-3) | Robert 9' | Report | | Stadium: Estádio Municipal João Havelange (Parque do Sabiá); Attendance: 29,474; Referee: Guilherme Cereta De Lima |

| 5 September 19 | Palmeiras | 2–3 | Cruzeiro | São Paulo |
| 16:00 (UTC-3) | Kléber 45' (pen.); Maurício Ramos 38' | Report | Roger 59'; Montillo 64'; Farías 85' | Stadium: Estádio Municipal Paulo Machado de Carvalho (Pacaembu); Attendance: 23,542; Referee: Héber Roberto Lopes |

| 8 September 20 | Cruzeiro | 1–0 | Internacional | Uberlândia |
| 19:30 (UTC-3) | Everton 14' | | | Stadium: Estádio Municipal João Havelange (Parque do Sabiá); Referee: Nielson Nogueira Dias |

| 12 September 21 | Avaí | 1–2 | Cruzeiro | Florianópolis |
| 16:00 (UTC-3) | Carreirinha 79' | | Roger 24'; Thiago Ribeiro 71' | Stadium: Estádio Aderbal Ramos da Silva (Ressacada); Referee: André Luiz de Freitas Castro |

| 15 September 22 | Cruzeiro | 4–2 | Guarani | Sete Lagoas |
| 19:30 (UTC-3) | Rômulo 26'; Wallyson 39'; Fabinho 75'; Farías 85' | | Geovane 69'; Paulo Roberto 74' | Stadium: Estádio Joaquim Henrique Nogueira (Arena da Jacaré); Attendance: 14,428; Referee: Wallace Nascimento Valente |

| 18 September 23 | Botafogo | 2–2 | Cruzeiro | Rio de Janeiro |
| 18:30 (UTC-3) | Alessandro 4'; Abreu 76' (pen.) | | Montillo 57', 72' | Stadium: Estádio Olímpico João Havelange (Engenhão); Attendance: 16,259; Referee: Heber Roberto Lopes |

| 22 September 24 | Cruzeiro | 2–0 | Ceará | Sete Lagoas |
| 19:30 (UTC-3) | Montillo 83'; Farías 90+1' | | | Stadium: Estádio Joaquim Henrique Nogueira (Arena da Jacaré); Referee: Cláudio Francisco Lima e Silva |

| 25 September 25 | Santos | 4–1 | Cruzeiro | Barueri |
| 18:30 (UTC-3) | Marcel 54'; Edu Dracena 69'; Alex Sandro 88'; Neymar 90' | | Thiago Ribeiro 80' | Stadium: Arena Barueri; Attendance: 9,542; Referee: Péricles Bassols Pegado Cortez |

| 29 September 26 | Cruzeiro | 3–0 | Atlético Goianiense | Sete Lagoas |
| 19:30 (UTC-3) | Cláudio Caçapa 30'; Montillo 44'; Wallyson 87' | | | Stadium: Estádio Joaquim Henrique Nogueira (Arena da Jacaré); Referee: Wilson Luiz Seneme |

| 2 October 27 | Cruzeiro | 0–0 | Atlético Paranaense | Sete Lagoas |
| 18:30 (UTC-3) | | | | Stadium: Estádio Joaquim Henrique Nogueira (Arena da Jacaré); Attendance: 17,254; Referee: Paulo Henrique Godoy Bezerra |

| 7 October 28 | Goiás | 0–1 | Cruzeiro | Goiânia |
| 21:00 (UTC-3) | | | Jonílson 55' (o.g.) | Stadium: Estádio do Governo do Estado de Goiás (Serra Dourada); Attendance: 6,170; Referee: Marcelo de Lima Henrique |

| 10 October 29 | Cruzeiro | 1–0 | Fluminense | Uberlândia |
| 16:00 (UTC-3) | Wellington Paulista 14' | | | Stadium: Estádio Municipal João Havelange (Parque do Sabiá); Attendance: 22,812; Referee: Carlos Eugênio Simon |

| 17 October 30 | Grêmio | 2–1 | Cruzeiro | Porto Alegre |
| 16:00 (UTC-2) | Júnior Viçosa 45+3'; Jonas 74' (pen.) | | Montillo 28' | Stadium: Estádio Olímpico Monumental; Attendance: 41,435; Referee: Paulo César Oliveira |

| 24 October 31 | Cruzeiro | 3–4 | Atlético Mineiro | Uberlândia |
| 18:30 (UTC-2) | Gilberto 37'; Thiago Ribeiro 76', 77' | | Obina 6', 23', 30'; Réver 66' | Stadium: Estádio Municipal João Havelange (Parque do Sabiá); Attendance: 18,732; Referee: Sandro Meira Ricci |

| 30 October 32 | Grêmio Prudente | 0–2 | Cruzeiro | Presidente Prudente |
| 18:30 (UTC-2) | | | Léo 18'; Robert 39' | Stadium: Estádio Municipal João Havelange (Prudentão); Attendance: 1,872; Referee: Jaílson Macedo Freitas |

| 3 November 33 | Cruzeiro | 0–2 | São Paulo | Uberlândia |
| 21:50 (UTC-2) | | | Lucas 52'; Rogério Ceni 80' (pen.) | Stadium: Estádio Municipal João Havelange (Parque do Sabiá); Attendance: 25,694; Referee: Nielson Nogueira Dias |

| 7 November 34 | Vitória | 0–1 | Cruzeiro | Salvador |
| 17:00 (UTC-2) | | | Thiago Ribeiro 35' | Stadium: Estádio Manoel Barradas (Barradão); Attendance: 34,540; Referee: Paulo Henrique De Godoy Bezerra |

| 13 November 35 | Corinthians | 1–0 | Cruzeiro | São Paulo |
| 19:30 (UTC-2) | Ronaldo 89' (pen.) | | | Stadium: Estádio Municipal Paulo Machado de Carvalho (Pacaembu); Attendance: 35,935; Referee: Sandro Meira Ricci |

| 21 November 36 | Cruzeiro | 3–1 | Vasco da Gama | Sete Lagoas |
| 19:30 (UTC-2) | Roger 14'; Henrique 19'; Edcarlos 32' | | Renato Augusto 44' | Stadium: Estádio Joaquim Henrique Nogueira (Arena da Jacaré); Attendance: 16,228; Referee: Leandro Pedro Vuaden |

| 28 November 37 | Flamengo | 1–2 | Cruzeiro | Volta Redonda |
| 17:00 (UTC-3) | Diego Maurício 9' | | Roger 16'; Thiago Ribeiro 68' | Stadium: Estádio General Sílvio Raulino de Oliveira; Attendance: 16,985; Referee: Leandro Pedro Vuaden |

| 5 December 38 | Cruzeiro | 2–1 | Palmeiras | Sete Lagoas |
| 17:00 (UTC-2) | Henrique 63'; Wallyson 90' | | Rivaldo 54' | Stadium: Estádio Joaquim Henrique Nogueira (Arena da Jacaré); Attendance: 16,191; Referee: Wilton Pereira Sampaio |

=== First stage ===
| 27 January First leg | Real Potosí (Bolivia) | 1–1 | (Brazil) Cruzeiro | Potosí |
| 19:50 (UTC-4) | Correa 88' | Report | Wellington Paulista 7' | Stadium: Estadio Víctor Agustín Ugarte; Attendance: 35,000; Referee: Víctor Hugo Rivera (Peru) |

| 3 February Second leg | Cruzeiro (Brazil) | 7–0 (8–1 agg.) | (Bolivia) Real Potosí | Belo Horizonte |
| 21:50 (UTC-2) | Marquinhos Paraná 29'; Thiago Ribeiro 30'; Kléber 39'; Jonathan 45'; Eliandro 87'; Bernardo 88'; Guerrón 90+1' | Report | | Stadium: Estádio Governador Magalhães Pinto (Mineirão); Attendance: 36,574; Referee: Diego Abal (Argentina) |

Group 7

| Pos | Team | Pld | W | D | L | GF | GA | GD | Pts |
|---|---|---|---|---|---|---|---|---|---|
| 1 | (Argentina) Vélez Sársfield | 6 | 4 | 1 | 1 | 10 | 5 | +5 | 13 |
| 2 | (Brazil) Cruzeiro | 6 | 3 | 2 | 1 | 12 | 6 | +6 | 11 |
| 3 | (Chile) Colo-Colo | 6 | 2 | 2 | 2 | 8 | 10 | −2 | 8 |
| 4 | (Venezuela) Deportivo Italia | 6 | 0 | 1 | 5 | 4 | 13 | −9 | 1 |

| 10 February 1 | Vélez Sársfield (Argentina) | 2–0 | (Brazil) Cruzeiro | Buenos Aires |
| 20:50 (UTC-3) | Silva 5'; Martínez 77' | Report | | Stadium: Estadio José Amalfitani; Attendance: 25,000; Referee: Martín Vázquez (Uruguay) |

| 24 February 2 | Cruzeiro (Brazil) | 4–1 | (Chile) Colo-Colo | Belo Horizonte |
| 19:30 (UTC-2) | Thiago Ribeiro 7'; Kléber 62' (pen.), 72' (pen.); Pedro Ken 69' | Report | Paredes 37' | Stadium: Estádio Governador Magalhães Pinto (Mineirão); Attendance: 32,927; Referee: Óscar Ruiz (Colombia) |

| 11 March 3 | Deportivo Italia (Venezuela) | 2–2 | (Brazil) Cruzeiro | Caracas |
| 19:45 (UTC-4:30) | Blanco 11'; McIntosh 65' | Report | Kléber 26', 50' | Stadium: Estadio Olímpico UCV; Attendance: 20,000; Referee: Carlos Vera (Ecuador) |

| 24 March 4 | Cruzeiro (Brazil) | 2–0 | (Venezuela) Deportivo Italia | Belo Horizonte |
| 21:50 (UTC-3) | Fabinho 6'; Pedro Ken 69' | Report | | Stadium: Estádio Governador Magalhães Pinto (Mineirão); Attendance: 17,237; Referee: Antonio Arias (Paraguay) |

| 31 March 5 | Cruzeiro (Brazil) | 3–0 | (Argentina) Vélez Sársfield | Belo Horizonte |
| 19:30 (UTC-3) | Thiago Ribeiro 32'; Kléber 48', 53' | Report | | Stadium: Estádio Governador Magalhães Pinto (Mineirão); Attendance: 43,374; Referee: Wilmar Roldán (Colombia) |

| 15 April 6 | Colo-Colo (Chile) | 1–1 | (Brazil) Cruzeiro | Santiago |
| 20:50 (UTC-4) | Millar 61' | Report | Thiago Ribeiro 57' | Stadium: Estadio Monumental; Attendance: 10,000; Referee: Carlos Torres (Paraguay) |

=== Round of 16 ===
| 29 April First leg | Cruzeiro (Brazil) | 3–1 | (Uruguay) Nacional | Belo Horizonte |
| 19:00 (UTC-3) | Thiago Ribeiro 7', 22', 42' | Report | Regueiro 51' | Stadium: Estádio Governador Magalhães Pinto (Mineirão); Attendance: 32,254; Referee: Héctor Baldassi (Argentina) |

| 5 May Second leg | Nacional (Uruguay) | 0–3 (1–6 agg.) | (Brazil) Cruzeiro | Montevideo |
| 21:50 (UTC-3) | | Report | Thiago Ribeiro 29'; Diego Renan 48'; Gilberto 80' | Stadium: Estadio Parque Central; Attendance: 22,000; Referee: Federico Beligoy (Argentina) |

=== Quarterfinals ===
| 12 May First leg | Cruzeiro (Brazil) | 0–2 | (Brazil) São Paulo | Belo Horizonte |
| 21:50 (UTC-3) | | Report | Dagoberto 23'; Hernanes 65' | Stadium: Estádio Governador Magalhães Pinto (Mineirão); Attendance: 48,602; Referee: Óscar Ruiz (Colombia) |

| 19 May Second leg | São Paulo (Brazil) | 2–0 (4–0 agg.) | (Brazil) Cruzeiro | São Paulo |
| 21:50 (UTC-3) | Hernanes 24'; Dagoberto 53' | Report | | Stadium: Estádio Cícero Pompeu de Toledo (Morumbi); Attendance: 52,196; Referee: Jorge Larrionda (Uruguay) |

== Statistics ==
=== Topscorers ===
| Position | Nation | Playing position | Name | Campeonato Mineiro | Copa Libertadores | Campeonato Brasileiro | Others | Total |
|---|---|---|---|---|---|---|---|---|
| 1 | (Brazil) | FW | Thiago Ribeiro | 5 | 8 | 8 | 2 | 23 |
| 2 | (Brazil) | FW | Wellington Paulista | 4 | 1 | 7 | 4 | 16 |
| 3 | (Brazil) | FW | Kléber | 5 | 7 | 2 | 0 | 14 |
| 4 | (Argentina) | MF | Walter Montillo | 0 | 0 | 7 | 0 | 7 |
| 5 | (Brazil) | MF | Roger | 2 | 0 | 4 | 0 | 6 |
| 6 | (Brazil) | MF | Gilberto | 2 | 1 | 2 | 0 | 5 |
| 7 | (Brazil) | MF | Fabinho | 2 | 1 | 1 | 0 | 4 |
| = | (Brazil) | MF | Henrique | 0 | 0 | 4 | 0 | 4 |
| 8 | (Brazil) | MF | Bernardo | 2 | 1 | 0 | 0 | 3 |
| = | (Argentina) | FW | Ernesto Farías | 0 | 0 | 3 | 0 | 3 |
| = | (Brazil) | DF | Leonardo Silva | 3 | 0 | 0 | 0 | 3 |
| = | (Brazil) | MF | Pedro Ken | 1 | 2 | 0 | 0 | 3 |
| = | (Brazil) | DF | Cláudio Caçapa | 1 | 0 | 1 | 1 | 3 |
| = | (Brazil) | FW | Robert | 0 | 0 | 3 | 0 | 3 |
| = | (Brazil) | FW | Wallyson | 0 | 0 | 3 | 0 | 3 |
| 9 | (Brazil) | FW | Anderson Lessa | 2 | 0 | 0 | 0 | 2 |
| = | (Brazil) | DF | Diego Renan | 1 | 1 | 0 | 0 | 2 |
| = | (Brazil) | FW | Eliandro | 1 | 1 | 0 | 0 | 2 |
| = | (Brazil) | DF | Gil | 1 | 0 | 1 | 0 | 2 |
| = | (Ecuador) | FW | Joffre Guerrón | 0 | 1 | 1 | 0 | 2 |
| = | (Brazil) | DF | Jonathan | 1 | 1 | 0 | 0 | 2 |
| = | (Brazil) | FW | Kieza | 2 | 0 | 0 | 0 | 2 |
| 10 | (Brazil) | DF | Edcarlos | 0 | 0 | 1 | 0 | 1 |
| 9 | (Brazil) | MF | Everton | 0 | 0 | 1 | 0 | 1 |
| = | (Brazil) | DF | Léo | 0 | 0 | 1 | 0 | 1 |
| = | (Brazil) | MF | Marquinhos Paraná | 0 | 1 | 0 | 0 | 1 |
| = | (Brazil) | DF | Rômulo | 0 | 0 | 1 | 0 | 1 |
| / | / | / | Own goals | 0 | 0 | 2 | 0 | 2 |
| | | | Total | 35 | 26 | 53 | 7 | 121 |

== See also ==
- Cruzeiro Esporte Clube
