= 2009 Cruzeiro EC season =

Cruzeiro
2009 season
- Chairman: Zezé Perrella
- Manager: Adilson Batista
- Campeonato Brasileiro: 4th place
- Campeonato Mineiro: Champion
- Copa Libertadores: Runner-up
- Top goalscorer: League: Wellington Paulista (14); All: Wellington Paulista (26)
- Highest home attendance: 64,800 ( v Estudiantes in the Copa Libertadores)
- Lowest home attendance: 2,425 ( v Democrata in the Campeonato Mineiro)

== Squad ==
Final Squad

Note: Flags indicate national team as defined under FIFA eligibility rules; some limited exceptions apply. Players may hold more than one non-FIFA nationality.

No.	Pos.	Nation	Player
1	GK	BRA	Fábio
-	GK	BRA	Andrey
-	GK	BRA	Rafael
-	DF	BRA	Jancarlos
-	DF	BRA	Jonathan
-	DF	BRA	Cláudio Caçapa
-	DF	BRA	Gil
-	DF	BRA	Gustavo
-	DF	BRA	Leonardo Silva
-	DF	BRA	Léo Fortunato
-	DF	BRA	Luizão
-	DF	BRA	Thiago Heleno
-	DF	BRA	Athirson
-	DF	BRA	Diego Renan
-	DF	BRA	Fernandinho
-	DF	BRA	Patric

No.	Pos.	Nation	Player
-	MF	BRA	Elicarlos
-	MF	BRA	Fabinho
-	MF	BRA	Fabrício
-	MF	BRA	Henrique
-	MF	BRA	Marquinhos Paraná
-	MF	BRA	Bernardo
-	MF	BRA	Gilberto
-	MF	BRA	Leandro Lima
19	FW	ECU	Joffre Guerrón
30	FW	BRA	Kléber
-	FW	BRA	Rômulo
-	FW	BRA	Soares
-	FW	BRA	Thiago Ribeiro
-	FW	BRA	Wanderley
-	FW	BRA	Wellington Paulista

Junior players with first team experience

Note: Flags indicate national team as defined under FIFA eligibility rules; some limited exceptions apply. Players may hold more than one non-FIFA nationality.

No.	Pos.	Nation	Player
-	DF	BRA	Luisão
-	DF	BRA	Neguete
-	DF	BRA	Vinícius
-	MF	BRA	Anderson Uchôa
-	MF	BRA	Mateus

No.	Pos.	Nation	Player
-	MF	BRA	Zé Eduardo
-	MF	BRA	Dudu
-	FW	BRA	Eliandro
-	FW	ECU	Fidel Martínez

== Transfers ==
=== Out on loan ===
Note: Flags indicate national team as defined under FIFA eligibility rules; some limited exceptions apply. Players may hold more than one non-FIFA nationality.

No.	Pos.	Nation	Player
—	DF	BRA	Thiago Martinelli (on loan to Cerezo Osaka)
—	MF	BRA	Camilo (on loan to Grêmio Barueri)
—	FW	BRA	Jajá (on loan to Vitória)

=== In ===
Note: Flags indicate national team as defined under FIFA eligibility rules; some limited exceptions apply. Players may hold more than one non-FIFA nationality.

No.	Pos.	Nation	Player
—	FW	BRA	Soares (from Grêmio)
—	FW	BRA	Wellington Paulista (from Botafogo)
—	DF	BRA	Leonardo Silva (from Vitória)
—	DF	BRA	Jancarlos (from São Paulo)
—	FW	BRA	Kléber (from Dynamo Kyiv)
—	DF	BRA	Anderson (on loan from São Paulo)
—	DF	BRA	Gustavo (on loan from Desportivo Brasil)
—	MF	BRA	Zé Carlos (on loan from Corinthians Alagoano)
—	DF	BRA	Athirson (from Portuguesa)
—	DF	BRA	Radar (from Ituiutaba)
—	MF	BRA	Fabinho (from Toulouse)
—	DF	BRA	Gilberto (from Tottenham Hotspur)
—	MF	BRA	Leandro Lima (on loan from Porto)
—	MF	ECU	Joffre Guerrón (on loan from Getafe)
—	DF	BRA	Gil (from Atlético Goianiense)
—	DF	BRA	Cláudio Caçapa (from Newcastle United)
—	DF	BRA	Patric (on loan from Benfica)

=== Out ===
Note: Flags indicate national team as defined under FIFA eligibility rules; some limited exceptions apply. Players may hold more than one non-FIFA nationality.

No.	Pos.	Nation	Player
—	DF	BRA	Jadílson (return to São Paulo)
—	DF	BRA	Carlinhos (return to Santos)
—	DF	ECU	Espinoza (to Barcelona Guayaquil)
—	FW	BRA	Weldon (to Sport Recife)
—	FW	BRA	Guilherme (to Dynamo Kyiv)
—	FW	BRA	Jael (to Goiás)
—	FW	BRA	Alessandro (end of contract)
—	MF	BRA	Ramires (to Benfica)
3	DF	BRA	Anderson (return to Lyon)
23	DF	ARG	Juan Pablo Sorín (Retired)
20	MF	BRA	Gérson Magrão (to Dynamo Kyiv)
10	MF	BRA	Wagner (to Lokomotiv Moscow)
18	FW	BRA	Zé Carlos (to Portuguesa)

== Statistics ==
=== Top scorers ===
Position	Nation	Playing position	Name	Campeonato Mineiro	Copa Libertadores	Campeonato Brasileiro	Friendly match	Total
1	(Brazil)	FW	Wellington Paulista	6	5	14	1	26
2	(Brazil)	FW	Kléber	13	4	7	0	24
3	(Brazil)	MF	Ramires	7	1	1	2	11
4	(Brazil)	FW	Thiago Ribeiro	0	1	8	1	10
5	(Brazil)	DF	Leonardo Silva	4	1	3	0	8
6	(Brazil)	MF	Gilberto	0	0	7	0	7
=	(Brazil)	DF	Jonathan	4	0	3	0	7
7	(Brazil)	FW	Soares	4	1	0	1	6
8	(Brazil)	MF	Fabrício	1	0	3	0	4
=	(Brazil)	MF	Henrique	0	2	2	0	4
9	(Brazil)	FW	Bernardo	1	0	1	1	3
=	(Brazil)	DF	Diego Renan	0	0	3	0	3
=	(Brazil)	DF	Fernandinho	1	1	0	1	3
=	(Brazil)	MF	Gérson Magrão	3	0	0	0	3
=	(Ecuador)	FW	Joffre Guerrón	0	0	2	1	3
=	(Brazil)	MF	Marquinhos Paraná	2	1	0	0	3
=	(Brazil)	FW	Wanderley	3	0	0	0	3
10	(Brazil)	FW	Eliandro	0	0	2	0	2
=	(Brazil)	MF	Wagner	0	2	0	0	2
=	(Brazil)	FW	Zé Carlos	0	1	1	0	2
11	(Brazil)	FW	Alessandro	1	0	0	0	1
=	(Brazil)	MF	Elicarlos	0	0	0	1	1
=	(Brazil)	MF	Fabinho	0	1	0	0	1
=	(Brazil)	DF	Jancarlos	1	0	0	0	1
=	(Brazil)	MF	Leandro Lima	0	0	1	0	1
=	(Brazil)	DF	Léo Fortunato	0	1	0	0	1
/	/	/	Own Goals	0	0	0	1	1
			Total	51	22	58	10	141

=== Overall ===
Games played	72 (17 Campeonato Mineiro, 14 Copa Libertadores, 38 Campeonato Brasileiro, 3 Friendly match )
Games won	42 (12 Campeonato Mineiro, 9 Copa Libertadores, 18 Campeonato Brasileiro, 3 Friendly match)
Games drawn	16 (5 Campeonato Mineiro, 3 Copa Libertadores, 8 Campeonato Brasileiro, 0 Friendly match)
Games lost	14 (0 Campeonato Mineiro, 2 Copa Libertadores, 12 Campeonato Brasileiro, 0 Friendly match)
Goals scored	141
Goals conceded	82
Goal difference	+59
Best result	7-0 (H) v Democrata – Campeonato Mineiro – 2009.3.25
Worst result	0-4 (A) v Estudiantes – Copa Libertadores – 2009.4.8
Top scorer	Wellington Paulista (26 goals)

Last updated: 29 November
Source: Cruzeiro EC

== Pre-season ==
=== Copa Bimbo ===
==== Bracket ====
Semi-finals
(Uruguay) Nacional	2
(Uruguay) Peñarol	1
(Brazil) Atlético Mineiro	2
(Brazil) Cruzeiro	4

Final
(Uruguay) Nacional	1
(Brazil) Cruzeiro	4
Third place
(Uruguay) Peñarol	1
(Brazil) Atlético Mineiro	4

==== Semi-final ====
2009-01-17
16:20 (UTC−3)

Atlético Mineiro (Brazil)	2 – 4	(Brazil) Cruzeiro
Diego Tardelli 36', 67'	(Report) (pt)	Renan 17' (o.g.); Fernandinho 39' (pen.); Ramires 45+1'; Soares 89'

Centenario – Montevideo
Attendance: 25,000
Referee: Jorge Larrionda (URU)

==== Final ====
2009-01-21
22:45 (UTC−3)

Nacional (Uruguay)	1 – 4	(Brazil) Cruzeiro
Medina 28'	(Report) (pt)	Elicarlos 7'; Ramires 26'; Thiago Ribeiro 35'; Wellington Paulista 37'

Centenario – Montevideo
Referee: Roberto Silvera (URU)

=== Juan Pablo Sorín farewell match ===
2009-11-04
21:50 (UTC−3)

Cruzeiro (Brazil)	2 – 1	(Argentina) Argentinos Juniors
Bernardo 52'; Guerrón 65'	(Report) (pt)	Santibañez 89'

Mineirão – Belo Horizonte
Attendance: 42,216
Referee: Cleisson Veloso Pereira (BRA)

== Campeonato Mineiro ==
=== League table ===
Final Standing
Team		Pts	G	W	D	L	GF	GA	GD
1	Atlético	26	11	8	2	1	24	8	16
2	Cruzeiro	25	11	7	4	0	31	8	23
3	Ituiutaba	20	11	6	2	3	20	16	4
4	Rio Branco	17	11	5	2	4	14	12	2
5	América	17	11	4	5	2	9	8	1
6	Democrata	16	11	5	1	5	17	20	-3
7	Tupi	15	11	3	6	2	9	10	-1
8	Uberaba	14	11	4	2	5	12	16	-4
9	Uberlândia	12	11	3	3	5	15	18	-3
10	Villa Nova	7	11	1	4	6	15	23	-8
11	Social	7	11	1	4	6	6	18	-12
12	Guarani	3	11	0	3	8	6	21	-15
Pts – points earned; G – games played; W – wins; D – draws; L – losses; GF – goals for; GA – goals against; GD – goal differential

Teams qualified to the quarterfinals
Teams relegated to Módulo II 2010

=== Matches ===
2009-01-25
19:10 (UTC−3)

Uberlândia	1 – 2	Cruzeiro
Rogério Corrêa 62'	(Report) (pt)	Gérson Magrão 10'; Fernandinho 71' (pen.)

Parque do Sabiá – Uberlândia
Attendance: 14,442
Referee: Ricardo Marques Ribeiro

2009-02-01
17:00 (UTC−3)

Cruzeiro	5 – 0	Social
Jonathan 20'; Ramires 38', 53'; Wellington Paulista 49', 80'	(Report) (pt)

Mineirão – Belo Horizonte
Attendance: 16,994
Referee: Alício Pena Júnior

2009-02-08
17:00 (UTC−3)

Villa Nova	2 – 3	Cruzeiro
Everton 73'; Marcelinho 88'	(Report) (pt)	Soares 55', 74'; Ramires 63'

Castor Cifuentes – Nova Lima
Attendance: 2,543
Referee: Renato Cardoso Conceição

2009-02-12
19:30 (UTC−3)

Cruzeiro	5 – 0	Guarani
Alessandro 22'; Leonardo Silva 56'; Wellington Paulista 59' (pen.); Jonathan 75'; Soares 86'	(Report) (pt)

Mineirão – Belo Horizonte
Attendance: 5,534
Referee: Joel Tolentino Damata Júnior

2009-02-15
16:00 (UTC−3)

Cruzeiro	2 – 1	Atlético
Ramires 18'; Soares 43'	(Report) (pt)	Diego Tardelli 76' (pen.)

Mineirão – Belo Horizonte
Attendance: 47,803
Referee: Alício Pena Júnior

2009-02-21
18:15 (UTC−3)

Uberaba	2 – 2	Cruzeiro
Michel Cury 31'; Ivonaldo 85'	(Report) (pt)	Jancarlos 7'; Gérson Magrão 38'

Uberabão – Uberaba
Attendance: 8,131
Referee: Émerson Almeida Ferreira

2009-03-01
16:00 (UTC−3)

Cruzeiro	4 – 1	Ituiutaba
Kléber 9', 19', 65'; Wellington Paulista 28'	(Report) (pt)	Kiko 44'

Mineirão – Belo Horizonte
Attendance: 11,674
Referee: Renato Cardoso Conceição

2009-03-08
19:10 (UTC−3)

Cruzeiro	0 – 0	Tupi
	(Report) (pt)

Mineirão – Belo Horizonte
Attendance: 9,535
Referee: Átila Carneiro Magalhão

2009-03-15
16:00 (UTC−3)

América	0 – 0	Cruzeiro
	(Report) (pt)

Mineirão – Belo Horizonte
Attendance: 13,591
Referee: Cleisson Veloso Pereira

2009-03-22
16:00 (UTC−3)

Rio Branco	1 – 1	Cruzeiro
Chimba 16' (pen.)	(Report) (pt)	Wellington Paulista 39' (pen.)

Parque do Azulão – Andradas
Attendance: 5,270
Referee: Renato Cardoso Conceição

2009-03-25
21:50 (UTC−3)

Cruzeiro	7 – 0	Democrata
Gérson Magrão 21'; Kléber 37' (pen.), 47', 51'; Ramires 43'; Bernardo 58' (pen.); Wanderley 68'	(Report) (pt)

Mineirão – Belo Horizonte
Attendance: 2,425
Referee: Émerson de Almeida Ferreira

=== Bracket ===
Quarter-finals
1st	Atlético	1	6	7
8th	Uberaba	0	0	0
4th	Rio Branco	0	3	3
5th	América	0	0	0
3rd	Ituiutaba	1	2	3
6th	Democrata	0	1	1
2nd	Cruzeiro	1	7	8
7th	Tupi	0	2	2

Semi-finals
1st	Atlético	2	1	3
4th	Rio Branco	0	0	0
3rd	Ituiutaba	1	1	2
2nd	Cruzeiro	4	2	6

Finals
1st	Atlético	0	1	1
2nd	Cruzeiro	5	1	6

=== Quarter-finals ===
2009-03-28
16:10 (UTC−3)

Cruzeiro	1 – 0	Tupi
Marquinhos Paraná 60'	(Report) (pt)

Mineirão – Belo Horizonte
Attendance: 9,882
Referee: Paulo César de Oliveira

2009-04-05
16:00 (UTC−3)

Tupi	2 – 7 ( 2 – 8 agg.)	Cruzeiro
Fabrício 69' (o.g.); Hugo 72'	(Report) (pt)	Kléber 32' (pen.), 54', 74'; Ramires 63', 87'; Fabrício 65'; Marquinhos Paraná 90+1'

Mário Helênio – Juiz de Fora
Attendance: 10,671
Referee: José Henrique de Carvalho

=== Semi-finals ===
2009-04-14
20:30 (UTC−3)

Ituiutaba	1 – 4	Cruzeiro
Rodrigo Hote 32'	(Report) (pt)	Wellington Paulista 15'; Kléber 79', 88'; Wanderley 86'

Mineirão – Belo Horizonte
Attendance: 12,390
Referee: Wilson Luiz Seneme

2009-04-19
16:00 (UTC−3)

Cruzeiro	2 – 1 ( 6 – 2 agg.)	Ituiutaba
Wanderley 56'; Leonardo Silva 59'	(Report) (pt)	Paulinho Pedalada 79'

Mineirão – Belo Horizonte
Attendance: 13,878
Referee: Leonardo Gaciba da Silva

=== Finals ===
2009-04-26
16:00 (UTC−3)

Cruzeiro	5 – 0	Atlético
Kléber 39'; Leonardo Silva 55', 61'; Jonathan 78', 86'	(Report) (pt)

Mineirão – Belo Horizonte
Attendance: 47,489
Referee: Paulo César de Oliveira

2009-05-03
16:00 (UTC−3)

Atlético	1 – 1 ( 1 – 6 agg.)	Cruzeiro
Fabiano 16'	(Report) (pt)	Kléber 21' (pen.)

Mineirão – Belo Horizonte
Attendance: 38,186
Referee: Leonardo Gaciba da Silva

== Copa Libertadores ==
=== Group stage ===
Team	Pld	W	D	L	GF	GA	GD	Pts
(Brazil) Cruzeiro	6	4	1	1	9	5	+4	13
(Argentina) Estudiantes	6	3	1	2	9	4	+5	10
(Ecuador) Deportivo Quito	6	2	2	2	6	9	−3	8
(Bolivia) Universitario de Sucre	6	0	2	4	2	8	−6	2

2009-02-19
19:15 (UTC−3)

Cruzeiro (Brazil)	3 – 0	(Argentina) Estudiantes
Fernandinho 63' (pen.); Kléber 69', 72'	(Report) (pt)

Mineirão – Belo Horizonte
Attendance: 33,969
Referee: Carlos Amarilla (PAR)

2009-02-25
19:50 (UTC−5)

Deportivo Quito (Ecuador)	1 – 1	(Brazil) Cruzeiro
Caicedo 90+1'	(Report) (pt)	Ramires 39'

Olímpico Atahualpa – Quito
Attendance: 6,960
Referee: Georges Buckley (PER)

2009-03-04
20:50 (UTC−4)

Universitario de Sucre (Bolivia)	0 – 1	(Brazil) Cruzeiro
	(Report) (pt)	Thiago Ribeiro 39'

Olímpico Patria – Sucre
Referee: Roberto Silvera (URU)

2009-03-18
21:50 (UTC−3)

Cruzeiro (Brazil)	2 – 0	(Bolivia) Universitario de Sucre
Wellington Paulista 58' (pen.), 90'	(Report) (pt)

Mineirão – Belo Horizonte
Attendance: 14,439
Referee: Federico Beligoy (ARG)

2009-04-08
22:30(UTC−3)

Estudiantes (Argentina)	4 – 0	(Brazil) Cruzeiro
Verón 6'; G. Fernández 32'; Prette 73', 77'	(Report) (pt)

Ciudad de La Plata – La Plata
Attendance: 18,505
Referee: Roberto Silvera (URU)

2009-04-22
19:30 (UTC−3)

Cruzeiro (Brazil)	2 – 0	(Ecuador) Deportivo Quito
Léo Fortunato 14'; Wagner 26'	(Report) (pt)

Mineirão – Belo Horizonte
Attendance: 34,175
Referee: Carlos Amarilla (PAR)

=== Knockout stage ===
Round of 16
1	(Brazil) Grêmio	3	2	5
16	(Peru) U. San Martín	1	0	1
8	(Venezuela) Caracas	1	4	5
9	(Ecuador) D. Cuenca	2	0	2
5	(Brazil) Cruzeiro	2	1	3
12	U. de Chile	1	0	1
4	(Brazil) São Paulo	−	−	−
13	(Mexico) Guadalajara	−	−	−
2	(Argentina) Boca Juniors	2	0	2
15	(Uruguay) Defensor S.	2	1	3
7	(Paraguay) Libertad	0	0	0
10	(Argentina) Estudiantes	3	0	3
3	(Uruguay) Nacional	−	−	−
14	(Mexico) San Luis	−	−	−
6	(Brazil) Sport Recife	0	1	1 (1)
11	(Brazil) Palmeiras	1	0	1 (3)

Quarter-finals
1	(Brazil) Grêmio (a)	1	0	1
8	(Venezuela) Caracas	1	0	1
5	(Brazil) Cruzeiro	2	2	4
4	(Brazil) São Paulo	1	0	1
15	(Uruguay) Defensor S.	0	0	0
10	(Argentina) Estudiantes	1	1	2
3	(Uruguay) Nacional (a)	1	0	1
11	(Brazil) Palmeiras	1	0	1

Semi-finals
1	(Brazil) Grêmio	1	2	3
5	(Brazil) Cruzeiro	3	2	5
10	(Argentina) Estudiantes	1	2	3
3	(Uruguay) Nacional	0	1	1

Finals
5	(Brazil) Cruzeiro	0	1	1
10	(Argentina) Estudiantes	0	2	2

=== Round of 16 ===
2009-05-07
21:15 (UTC−4)

Universidad de Chile	1 – 2	(Brazil) Cruzeiro
Villalobos 85'	(Report) (pt)	Soares 8'; Marquinhos Paraná 51'

Estadio Nacional – Santiago
Referee: Jorge Larrionda (URU)

2009-05-14
19:30 (UTC−3)

Cruzeiro (Brazil)	1 – 0 ( 3 – 1 agg.)	Universidad de Chile
Kléber 73'	(Report) (pt)

Mineirão – Belo Horizonte
Attendance: 36,898
Referee: Héctor Baldassi (ARG)

=== Quarter-finals ===
2009-05-27
21:50 (UTC−3)

Cruzeiro (Brazil)	2 – 1	(Brazil) São Paulo
Leonardo Silva 45'; Zé Carlos 64'	(Report) (pt)	Washington 56'

Mineirão – Belo Horizonte
Attendance: 52,906
Referee: Carlos Chandía (CHI)

2009-06-18
22:00 (UTC−3)

São Paulo (Brazil)	0 – 2 ( 1 – 4 agg.)	(Brazil) Cruzeiro
	(Report) (pt)	Henrique 66'; Kléber 81' (pen.)

Morumbi – São Paulo
Attendance: 52,859
Referee: Sergio Pezzota (ARG)

=== Semi-finals ===
2009-06-24
21:50 (UTC−3)

Cruzeiro (Brazil)	3 – 1	(Brazil) Grêmio
Wellington Paulista 37'; Wagner 46'; Fabinho 66'	(Report) (pt)	Souza 78'

Mineirão – Belo Horizonte
Attendance: 51,296
Referee: Henrique Osses (CHI) / Jorge Osório (CHI)

2009-07-02
21:50 (UTC−3)

Grêmio (Brazil)	2 – 2 ( 3 – 5 agg.)	(Brazil) Cruzeiro
Réver 54'; Souza 74'	(Report) (pt)	Wellington Paulista 34', 36'

Olímpico – Porto Alegre
Attendance: 40,452
Referee: Oscar Ruiz (COL)

=== Finals ===
2009-07-08
21:50 (UTC−3)

Estudiantes (Argentina)	0 – 0	(Brazil) Cruzeiro
	(Report) (pt)

Ciudad de La Plata – La Plata
Referee: Jorge Larrionda (URU)

2009-07-15
21:50 (UTC−3)

Cruzeiro (Brazil)	1 – 2 ( 1 – 2 agg.)	(Argentina) Estudiantes
Henrique 51'	(Report) (pt)	G. Fernández 56'; Boselli 72'

Mineirão – Belo Horizonte
Attendance: 64,800
Referee: Carlos Chandía (CHI)

== Campeonato Brasileiro ==
=== League table ===
Final Standing
Team		Pts	G	W	D	L	GF	GA	GD
1	Flamengo	67	38	19	10	9	58	44	+14
2	Internacional	65	38	19	8	11	65	44	+21
3	São Paulo	65	38	18	11	9	57	42	+15
4	Cruzeiro	62	38	18	8	12	58	53	+5
5	Palmeiras	62	38	17	11	10	58	45	+13
6	Avaí	57	38	15	12	11	61	52	+9
7	Atlético Mineiro	56	38	16	8	14	55	56	-1
8	Grêmio	55	38	15	10	13	67	46	+21
9	Goiás	55	38	15	10	13	64	65	-1
10	Corinthians	52	38	14	10	14	50	54	-4
11	Grêmio Barueri	49	38	12	13	13	59	52	+7
12	Santos	49	38	12	13	13	58	58	0
13	Vitória	48	38	13	9	16	51	57	-6
14	Atlético Paranaense	48	38	13	9	16	42	49	-7
15	Botafogo	47	38	11	14	13	52	58	-6
16	Fluminense	46	38	11	13	14	49	56	-7
17	Coritiba	45	38	12	9	17	48	60	-12
18	Santo André	41	38	11	8	19	46	61	-15
19	Náutico	38	38	10	8	20	48	71	-23
20	Sport	31	38	7	10	21	48	71	-23
Pts – points earned; G – games played; W – wins; D – draws; L – losses; GF – goals for; GA – goals against; GD – goal differential

Team qualifies for Copa Libertadores 2010
Teams qualified for the Copa Libertadores 2010
Team qualifies for the preliminary round of Copa Libertadores 2010
Teams qualified for the Copa Sudamericana 2010
Teams relegated to Série B 2010

==== Results summary ====
Overall								Home						Away					
Pld	W	D	L	GF	GA	GD	Pts	W	D	L	GF	GA	GD	W	D	L	GF	GA	GD
38	18	8	12	58	53	+5	62	9	3	7	30	25	+5	9	5	5	28	28	0

Last updated: 2009-12-07.
Source: Campeonato Brasileiro Série A 2009

Pld = Matches played; W = Matches won; D = Matches drawn; L = Matches lost;

=== Results by round ===
Round	1	2	3	4	5	6	7	8	9	10	11	12	13	14	15	16	17	18	19	20	21	22	23	24	25	26	27	28	29	30	31	32	33	34	35	36	37	38
Ground	H	A	H	A	H	A	H	H	A	H	H	A	A	H	A	H	A	H	A	H	A	A	H	A	H	A	A	H	A	H	A	H	H	A	H	A	H	A
Result	W	L	W	L	D	L	L	W	L	L	L	W	D	W	L	L	W	D	W	W	D	D	L	W	L	W	D	W	W	W	W	W	L	W	D	D	W	W
Position	1	7	4	7	10	10	15	9	13	16	18	15	16	14	15	16	14	14	13	12	12	13	13	13	13	13	11	9	7	7	6	5	6	5	6	6	5	4

Updated to match(es) played on 7 December. Source: Matches
A = Away; H = Home; W = Win; D = Draw; L = Loss

=== Matches ===
2009-05-10
16:00 (UTC−3)

Cruzeiro	2 – 0	Flamengo
Kléber 29' (pen.); Ramires 89'	(Report) (pt)

Mineirão – Belo Horizonte
Attendance: 24,564
Referee: Paulo César Oliveira

2009-05-17
18:30 (UTC−3)

Náutico	2 – 0	Cruzeiro
Derley 57'; Carlinhos Bala 71'	(Report) (pt)

Aflitos – Recife
Attendance: 14,127
Referee: Wagner Tardelli Azevedo

2009-05-23
18:30 (UTC−3)

Cruzeiro	2 – 0	Vitória
Kléber 22', 28'	(Report) (pt)

Mineirão – Belo Horizonte
Attendance: 7,344
Referee: Héber Roberto Lopes

2009-05-31
16:00 (UTC−3)

São Paulo	3 – 0	Cruzeiro
Washington 12'; Borges 32'; Dagoberto 77'	(Report) (pt)

Morumbi – São Paulo
Attendance: 51,800
Referee: Evandro Rogério Roman

2009-06-07
18:30 (UTC−3)

Cruzeiro	1 – 1	Internacional
Wellington Paulista 47'	(Report) (pt)	Magrão 5'

Mineirão – Belo Horizonte
Attendance: 16,687
Referee: Antônio Hora Filho

2009-06-14
18:30 (UTC−3)

Palmeiras	3 – 1	Cruzeiro
Marcão 33'; Keirrison 38', 58'	(Report) (pt)	Bernardo 24'

Palestra Itália – São Paulo
Attendance: 11,214
Referee: Leandro Pedro Vuaden

2009-06-21
18:30 (UTC−3)

Cruzeiro	2 – 4	Grêmio Barueri
Jonathan 2'; Wellington Paulista 44'	(Report) (pt)	Thiago Humberto 10'; Pedrão 26', 74' (pen.); Márcio Careca 47'

Mineirão – Belo Horizonte
Attendance: 6,117
Referee: Leonardo Gaciba da Silva

2009-06-27
18:30 (UTC−3)

Cruzeiro	1 – 0	Avaí
Zé Carlos 41' (pen.)	(Report) (pt)

Mineirão – Belo Horizonte
Attendance: 3,435
Referee: Jailson Macedo Freitas

2009-07-05
16:00 (UTC−3)

Goiás	1 – 0	Cruzeiro
Felipe 20'	(Report) (pt)

Serra Dourada – Goiânia
Attendance: 5,809
Referee: Wilson Souza de Mendonça

2009-07-12
16:00 (UTC−3)

Cruzeiro	0 – 3	Atlético Mineiro
	(Report) (pt)	Júnior 40'; Alessandro 42'; Éder Luís 87'

Mineirão – Belo Horizonte
Attendance: 22,583
Referee: Paulo César de Oliveira

2009-07-19
16:00 (UTC−3)

Cruzeiro	1 – 2	Corinthians
Kléber 84' (pen.)	(Report) (pt)	Jorge Henrique 22'; Ronaldo 76'

Mineirão – Belo Horizonte
Attendance: 32,595
Referee: Elmo Alves Resende Cunha

2009-07-22
19:30 (UTC−3)

Santo André	0 – 2	Cruzeiro
	(Report) (pt)	Kléber 59'; Diego Renan 68'

Bruno José Daniel – Santo André
Attendance: 1,709
Referee: Carlos Eugênio Simon

2009-07-26
18:30 (UTC−3)

Fluminense	1 – 1	Cruzeiro
Kieza 47'	(Report) (pt)	Henrique 28'

Maracanã – Rio de Janeiro
Attendance: 13,560
Referee: Arílson Bispo da Anunciação

2009-07-29
21:50 (UTC−3)

Cruzeiro	1 – 0	Sport
Kléber 89'	(Report) (pt)

Mineirão – Belo Horizonte
Attendance: 17,954
Referee: Marcelo de Lima Henrique

2009-08-02
18:30 (UTC−3)

Grêmio	4 – 1	Cruzeiro
Réver 58'; Tcheco 64'; Jonas 75'; Maxi López 87'	(Report) (pt)	Wellington Paulista 40' (pen.)

Olímpico – Porto Alegre
Attendance: 13,306
Referee: Evandro Rogério Roman

2009-08-05
19:30 (UTC−3)

Cruzeiro	0 – 2	Atlético Paranaense
	(Report) (pt)	Marcinho 48'; Gabriel Pimba 87'

Mineirão – Belo Horizonte
Attendance: 15,485
Referee: Sálvio Spínola Fagundes Filho

2009-08-09
18:30 (UTC−3)

Coritiba	1 – 3	Cruzeiro
Marcelinho Paraíba 69'	(Report) (pt)	Wellington Paulista 20' (pen.), 55'; Thiago Ribeiro 50'

Couto Pereira – Curitiba
Attendance: 11,485
Referee: Paulo César Oliveira

2009-08-16
18:30 (UTC−3)

Cruzeiro	0 – 0	Santos
	(Report) (pt)

Mineirão – Belo Horizonte
Attendance: 16,939
Referee: Marcelo de Lima Henrique

2009-08-20
21:00 (UTC−3)

Flamengo	1 – 2	Cruzeiro
Emerson 32'	(Report) (pt)	Diego Renan 51'; Fabrício 69'

Maracanã – Rio de Janeiro
Attendance: 12,272
Referee: Rodrigo Martins Cintra

2009-08-23
18:30 (UTC−3)

Cruzeiro	4 – 2	Náutico
Wellington Paulista 1', 36' (pen.), 90+3'; Fabrício 29'	(Report) (pt)	Gilmar 6' (pen.); Carlinhos Bala 90+8'

Mineirão – Belo Horizonte
Attendance: 14,708
Referee: Pablo dos Santos Alves

2009-08-27
21:00 (UTC−3)

Botafogo	1 – 1	Cruzeiro
Lúcio Flávio 32'	(Report) (pt)	Thiago Ribeiro 66'

Engenhão – Rio de Janeiro
Attendance: 6,472
Referee: Héber Roberto Lopes

2009-08-30
18:30 (UTC−3)

Vitória	3 – 3	Cruzeiro
Roger 66', 88'; Ramon 85'	(Report) (pt)	Gilberto 3', 64' (pen.); Thiago Ribeiro 76'

Barradão – Salvador
Attendance: 8,138
Referee: Marcelo de Lima Henrique

2009-09-06
16:00 (UTC−3)

Cruzeiro	1 – 2	São Paulo
Diego Renan 43'	(Report) (pt)	Marlos 64'; Borges 80'

Mineirão – Belo Horizonte
Attendance: 27,953
Referee: Luís Antonio Silva dos Santos

2009-09-13
16:00 (UTC−3)

Internacional	2 – 3	Cruzeiro
Alecsandro 28' (pen.); Andrezinho 74'	(Report) (pt)	Gilberto 36' (pen.), 52'; Thiago Ribeiro 75'

Beira-Rio – Porto Alegre
Attendance: 38,350
Referee: Paulo Henrique Godoy Bezerra

2009-09-23
21:50 (UTC−3)

Cruzeiro	1 – 2	Palmeiras
Thiago Ribeiro 7'	(Report) (pt)	Diego Souza 9'; Vágner Love 49'

Mineirão – Belo Horizonte
Attendance: 26,282
Referee: Evandro Rogério Roman

2009-09-26
18:30 (UTC−3)

Grêmio Barueri	0 – 1	Cruzeiro
	(Report) (pt)	Gilberto 72'

Arena Barueri – Barueri
Attendance: 3,365
Referee: Djalma José Beltrami

2009-10-04
18:30 (UTC−3)

Avaí	2 – 2	Cruzeiro
Cristian 53'; Léo Gago 90+2'	(Report) (pt)	Leonardo Silva 42'; Fabrício 60'

Ressacada – Florianópolis
Attendance: 10,823
Referee: Carlos Eugênio Simon

2009-10-08
21:00 (UTC−3)

Cruzeiro	3 – 0	Goiás
Leandro Lima 46'; Wellington Paulista 48', 54'	(Report) (pt)

Mineirão – Belo Horizonte
Attendance: 7,693
Referee: Leandro Pedro Vuaden

2009-10-12
16:00 (UTC−3)

Atlético Mineiro	0 – 1	Cruzeiro
	(Report) (pt)	Wellington Paulista 11'

Mineirão – Belo Horizonte
Attendance: 45,959
Referee: Sálvio Spínola Fagundes Filho

2009-10-18
18:30 (UTC−3)

Cruzeiro	1 – 0	Botafogo
Thiago Ribeiro 62'	(Report) (pt)

Mineirão – Belo Horizonte
Attendance: 28,504
Referee: Leonardo Gaciba da Silva

2009-10-25
18:30 (UTC−3)

Corinthians	0 – 1	Cruzeiro
	(Report) (pt)	Gilberto 62'

Pacaembu – São Paulo
Attendance: 28,504
Referee: Leonardo Gaciba da Silva

2009-10-28
21:00 (UTC−3)

Cruzeiro	3 – 2	Santo André
Guerrón 58'; Eliandro 83'; Thiago Ribeiro 90+1'	(Report) (pt)	Nunes 62'; Júnior Dutra 72'

Mineirão – Belo Horizonte
Attendance: 19,567
Referee: Célio Amorim

2009-11-01
18:30 (UTC−3)

Cruzeiro	2 – 3	Fluminense
Jonathan 12'; Wellington Paulista 29'	(Report) (pt)	Gum 54'; Fred 57', 70'

Mineirão – Belo Horizonte
Attendance: 49,140
Referee: Célio Amorim

2009-11-07
18:30 (UTC−3)

Sport	2 – 3	Cruzeiro
Wilson 12', 16'	(Report) (pt)	Thiago Ribeiro 20'; Leonardo Silva 52'; Guerrón 65'

Ilha do Retiro – Recife
Attendance: 11,458
Referee: Paulo Henrique Godoy Bezerra

2009-11-14
19:30 (UTC−3)

Cruzeiro	1 – 1	Grêmio
Gilberto 65' (pen.)	(Report) (pt)	Herrera 90+1'

Mineirão – Belo Horizonte
Attendance: 51,534
Referee: Marcelo de Lima Henrique

2009-11-21
19:30 (UTC−3)

Atlético Paranaense	1 – 1	Cruzeiro
Marcinho 73'	(Report) (pt)	Leonardo Silva 90'

Arena da Baixada – Curitiba
Attendance: 17,686
Referee: Paulo César Oliveira

2009-11-29
17:00 (UTC−3)

Cruzeiro	4 – 1	Coritiba
Henrique 43'; Jonathan 45+1'; Wellington Paulista 56' (pen.); Eliandro 66'	(Report) (pt)	Jeci 10'

Mineirão – Belo Horizonte
Attendance: 27,291
Referee: Sálvio Spínola Fagundes Filho

2009-12-06
17:00 (UTC−3)

Santos	1 – 2	Cruzeiro
Neymar 70'	(Report) (pt)	Wellington Paulista 4'; Kléber 75'

Vila Belmiro – Santos
Attendance: 6,942
Referee: Marcelo de Lima Henrique

== See also ==
- Cruzeiro Esporte Clube
