= Vicente Arenari =

Brazilian footballer

Personal information
- Full name: Vicente Arenari Filho
- Date of birth: 23 March 1935
- Place of birth: Natividade, Rio de Janeiro, Brazil
- Date of death: 14 July 2013 (aged 78)
- Place of death: Natividade, Rio de Janeiro, Brazil
- Position: Defender

Youth career
- 19xx–1954: Flamengo

Senior career*
Years	Team	Apps	(Gls)
1954–1955	Flamengo		
1956–1962	Bahia		
1963–1965	Palmeiras	48	(1)
1966–1967	Nacional-SP		

Managerial career
- Nacional-SP
- 1985–1986: Palmeiras
- Botafogo
- Mogi Mirim
- Ferroviária
- Santo André
- Saad
- Caxias
- Esportivo
- 1991: Juventude
- Joinville
- Figueirense
- Chapecoense
- Uberlândia
- Americano
- Goytacaz
- Itaperuna
- * Club domestic league appearances and goals

Vicente Arenari Filho (23 March 1935 – 14 July 2013) was a Brazilian professional football player, who played as defender and was also a manager.

== Career as a player ==
Began in Flamengo's youth teams, where he start his professional career in 1954. Later he played for the teams: Bahia, Palmeiras and Nacional-SP, where he finished his career in 1967.

== Career as a manager ==
Since 1968 he coached the clubs: Nacional-SP, Palmeiras, Botafogo, Mogi Mirim, Ferroviária, Santo André, Saad, Caxias, Esportivo, Juventude, Joinville, Figueirense, Chapecoense, Uberlândia, Americano, Goytacaz and Itaperuna.

On July 14, 2013, on a Sunday night, the former player Vicente Arenari died aged 78, suffered a stroke.
