= Natividade =

Natividade refers to the following places in Brazil:

- Natividade, Rio de Janeiro
- Natividade, Tocantins
- Natividade da Serra, São Paulo
