= Fábio (footballer, born 1980) =

Brazilian footballer (born 1980)

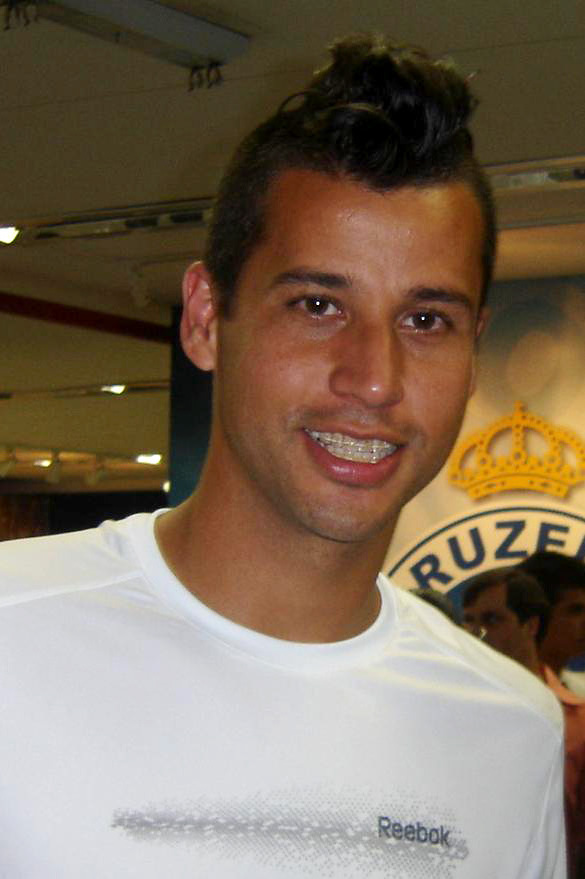
- Fábio in 2009

Personal information
- Full name: Fábio Deivson Lopes Maciel Bento
- Date of birth: 30 September 1980 (age 46)
- Place of birth: Nobres, Mato Grosso, Brazil
- Height: 1.89 m (6 ft 2 in)
- Position: Goalkeeper

Team information
- Current team: Fluminense
- Number: 1

Youth career
- 1993–1997: União Bandeirante

Senior career*
Years	Team	Apps	(Gls)
1997–2000	União Bandeirante	30	(0)
1998	→ Atlético Paranaense (loan)	0	(0)
1999–2000	→ Cruzeiro (loan)	0	(0)
2000–2004	Vasco da Gama	130	(0)
2005–2021	Cruzeiro	789	(0)
2022–	Fluminense	227	(0)

International career
1995–1997	Brazil U17 (Note: Fábio made at least 13 appearances for Brazil U17: seven appearances in the 1997 South American U-17 Championship and six appearances in the 1997 FIFA U-17 World Championship, and may have matches unaccounted for Brazil U17, having played for Brazil U17 since 1995.)	13+	(0)
1998–1999	Brazil U20 (Note: Fábio made at least 9 appearances for Brazil U20: four appearances in 1998 and five appearances in 1999, was also part of the U20 squad that played in the 1999 South American U-20 Championship, but he didn't make any appearance (Júlio César was the goalkeeper in all matches Brazil played), and may have matches unaccounted for Brazil U20 in the 1998 Toulon Tournament.)	9+	(0)
1998	Brazil U23	3	(0)
- * Club domestic league appearances and goals as of 18 November 2026 (UTC)

Fábio Deivson Lopes Maciel (born 30 September 1980), simply known as Fábio, is a Brazilian professional footballer who plays as a goalkeeper for Campeonato Brasileiro Série A club Fluminense.

Fábio has spent his entire professional career in Brazil, creating his debut with União Bandeirante in 1997. He joined Vasco da Gama in 2000, followed by Cruzeiro in 2004, where he would spend 16 seasons, before joining Fluminense in 2022. Since 2002, he has been a starter for his club in every season of the Série A, winning the competition three times. He also won the 2023 Copa Libertadores with Fluminense. Fábio played for Brazil at youth level, winning 1997 U-17 World Cup. He has been called up to the senior Brazil squad and was part of the team that won the 2004 Copa América but has never played a match for them.

He holds the all-time record for the most competitive appearances in world football, having played over 1,450 matches, almost all at club level. He is also the record holder for clean sheets at professional level, with over 521 clean sheets.

== Club career ==
=== Early career ===
Born in Nobres, Mato Grosso, Fábio began his career with União Bandeirante-PR before moving to Atlético-PR on loan, where he won the Campeonato Paranaense in 1998. However, his 16 appearances at the club were considered at youth level.

Fábio joined Cruzeiro on another loan in 1999, but only played a friendly match in March 2000. A backup option, he won the Copa do Brasil.

=== Vasco da Gama ===
In 2000, Fábio joined Vasco da Gama, where he won the Campeonato Brasileiro and the Copa Mercosur in the same year. He later won the Campeonato Carioca in 2003.

=== Cruzeiro ===
Fábio returned to Cruzeiro in 2005 in an exchange for the striker Alex Dias. A year later, he achieved the Campeonato Mineiro with the club.

In the first half of 2007, Fabio's performance on the field was inconsistent with consequential mistakes, most notably in the first leg of the state championship against rivals Atlético, which ended in a 4–0 loss, with Atlético scoring the fourth goal by sliding the ball into an empty net after Fábio had turned his back to the field. Cruzeiro supporters asked for his removal from the starting squad, and likewise, Fábio was out for three months for an alleged injury, even though he had played the whole match against Atlético, during which he did not show any sign of severe pain. Returning to his starting position in July, he went on to finish the season with the best save percentage in Brazil.

In November 2007, after speculation mounted on a possible move in the January 2008 transfer period, it was announced Fabio would extend his Cruzeiro contract until December 2009. In April 2008, it was reported that he would move to Fiorentina, subject to application on obtaining an EU passport as under descendant status, but the move never happened.

On 2 June 2010, Fábio became only the third goalkeeper to have his hands engraved on the stadium's Walk of Fame. Later that year, on 5 December, he was awarded the Bola de Prata as the best goalkeeper of Série A. On 27 July 2011, Fábio made his 400th appearance for Cruzeiro in a Série A match against Atlético Goianiense. On 7 February 2012, he was awarded the Troféu Telê Santana, given to the best starting eleven in Minas Gerais, thus becoming the outright all-time winner of this award with nine victories in eleven participations.

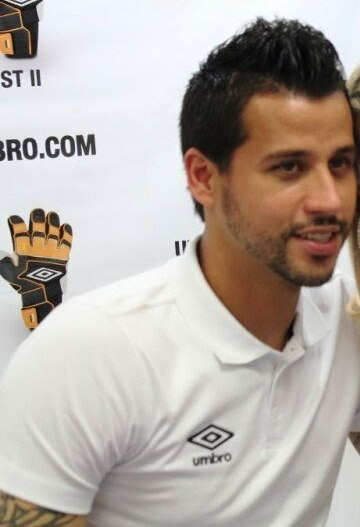
Fábio in 2011

During both the 2013 and 2014 Campeonato Brasileiro Série A winning campaigns, Fábio served as Cruzeiro's captain and thus lifted the Brasileirão trophy twice in a row. Therefore, he was selected in 2013 as the best goalkeeper in Brazil, winning the prestigious Bola de Prata trophy for the position for the second time.

On 7 November 2014, Fábio made his 600th appearance for Cruzeiro in a Série A match against Criciúma. On 13 June 2015, he became Cruzeiro's all-time record appearance holder, playing his 634th match for the club in a 3–1 away victory over Vasco da Gama, surpassing the previous mark set by Zé Carlos. A year later, on 16 July 2016, he made his 700th appearance for Cruzeiro in a Série A match against his future club Fluminense, jokingly stating that he would "trade 100 games for ten points". The following month, on 14 August, in a Série A match against Coritiba, he sustained a sprained knee during a tackle from Turkish striker Kazim, and even though he managed to push through for over 20 minutes, he soon asked to be replaced by Lucas França. On 9 April 2017, after eight months away, Fábio made his return to the field in a Campeonato Mineiro match against Democrata, having to now dispute the starting goalkeeper spot with Rafael.

Later that year, Fábio played a crucial role in helping Cruzeiro win the 2017 Copa do Brasil, saving one penalty in the shoot-out against Grêmio in the semi-finals and saving another penalty in the shoot-out against Flamengo in the finals. The following year, he once again played a crucial role in helping Cruzeiro win the 2018 Copa do Brasil, saving all three penalties in the shoot-out against Santos in the quarter-finals, which allowed him to reach a total of 24 penalty saves, despite having only three in 2008, aged 28. He then started in both legs of the finals, which ended in a 3–1 aggregate victory over Corinthians. Four days after the final, on 21 October, he made his 800th appearance for Cruzeiro in a Série A match against Chapecoense, keeping a clean-sheet in a 3–0 victory.

On 1 September 2019, Fábio saved a penalty in his 575th Série A appearance, a 1–0 win over Vasco, matching Rogério Ceni's record to become the joint player with the most appearances in Série A. On 8 October 2020, he made his 900th appearance for Cruzeiro in a Mineirão match against Sampaio Corrêa, thus becoming only the fifth Brazilian player to do so for a single club, after São Paulo's Rogério Ceni (1.238), Santos' Pelé (1.116), Vasco's Roberto Dinamite (1.110), and Palmeiras' Ademir da Guia (901). (Note: The tallies of Pelé and Dinamite include friendlies.)

On 5 January 2022, Fábio announced on his Instagram account that he would leave the club after 17 seasons, because the club was not willing to renew his contract until December 2022, as it had been previously verbally agreed with the club's president Sérgio Santos Rodrigues, but instead for only three more months, which Fábio did not accept as he felt that he was still in "great physical and technical condition to continue playing at a highest level". The goalkeeper left Cruzeiro with twelve titles won and 976 games played, thus ending his dream of reaching 1,000 matches for Cruzeiro. During his time there, he survived ten coaches and three presidential coups, as well as his embarrassment blunder against Atlético Mineiro in 2007.

=== Fluminense ===
==== 2022–23 ====
Having joined Fluminense on 21 January 2022, Fábio made his debut for the club two weeks later, on 4 February, in a game against Audax Rio, becoming, at the age of 41 years and 120 days, the oldest footballer in the club's history, surpassing the record of Magno Alves (40 years and 312 days). On 1 May 2022, he made his 600th Série A appearance against Coritiba, becoming the first-ever player to do so. During the 2022 season, the 42-year-old Fábio played in 86% of Fluminense's matches, even though his contract only demanded 60%, including all 38 rounds of the Série A, repeating a feat he had already achieved with Cruzeiro in 2008.

On 12 April 2023, Fábio become the first-ever player to make 100 appearances in the Copa do Brasil, keeping a clean-sheet in a 3–0 win over Paysandu. The following month, on 25 May, he made his 91st appearance in the Copa Libertadores, a 1–0 loss to The Strongest, overtaking Rogério Ceni to become the Brazilian with the most games in the history of the Copa Libertadores. On 25 July 2023, he made his 100th appearance for Fluminense in a Série A match against Coritiba.

Later that year, on 4 November, Fábio became the first Brazilian to reach a 3-digit tally of participations in the Copa Libertadores by starting in the final against Boca Juniors, helping his side to a 2–1 victory in extra-time. In doing so at the age of 43, he also became the oldest player to play in and win a Copa Libertadores final, surpassing Ever Almeida's record from 1990, aged 42. This victory qualified the club for the 2023 FIFA Club World Cup, where he kept a clean-sheet in the semifinals against Al Ahly (2–0), becoming, at the age of 43, the second-oldest player in the history of the Club World Cup, only behind Óscar Pérez, aged 44 years and 10 months in the 2017 edition. In the final on 22 December, Fluminense lost 4–0 to the European treble winners Manchester City, becoming, at the age of 43 years and 83 days, the oldest player to compete in a Club World Cup or Intercontinental Cup final, surpassing Ever Almeida's record from 1990, aged 42.

==== 2023-24 ====
In February 2024, Fábio started in both legs of the 2024 Recopa Sudamericana against Ecuadorian side LDU Quito, keeping a clean-sheet in the second leg on 29 February to help Fluminense win its first-ever Recopa Sudamericana title. In doing so at the age of 43, he became the oldest player to play in and win the Recopa Sudamericana. On 13 April, Fábio started in the opening matchday of the 2024 Série A against Bragantino, becoming, at the age of 43 years and 6 months, the oldest player in the history of Série A, surpassing Zé Roberto's record from 2017, aged 43 years and 4 months. On 1 May, he overtook Peter Shilton to become the player with the most domestic matches in the history of football (1089).

On 20 August 2024, Fábio made his 108th appearance in the Copa Libertadores, a 2–1 win over Grêmio in the second leg of the round of 16, overtaking Sergio Aquino to become the player with the second most games in the competition's history, only behind Ever Almeida (113). Having lost the first leg 2–1, the tie was decided on penalties, in which he saved two of them to help Fluminense reach the quarter-finals. In 2024, he saved his 38th penalty, thus becoming the joint-fourth Brazilian goalkeeper (alongside Tiago Volpi) with the most penalty saves in history, only behind Diego Alves (40), Dida (42), and Rogério Ceni (51).

On 25 September 2024, just five days shy of his 44th birthday, Fábio became the second-oldest player in the history of the Copa Libertadores, overtaking José Francisco Nieto by six days; Fluminense lost the match 2–0 to Atlético Mineiro, thus being knocked out from the competition. On 26 October, he made his 700th Série A appearance against Vitória, becoming the first-ever player to do so. At the age of 44 years and 69 days, Fábio was the second-oldest player in the world to feature in a top-tier national league match in 2024, only behind the Bangladeshi defender Nasiruddin Chowdhury, who appeared in a Bangladesh Premier League match at the age of 44 years and 219 days.

==== 2024-25 και 2025-26 ====
On 13 March 2025, Fábio made his 200th appearance for Fluminense in the first leg of the 2025 Campeonato Carioca final against Flamengo, which ended in a 1–2 loss. Throughout these 200 matches, the 40-year-old Fábio kept 78 clean-sheets, made over 600 saves, including four penalties. On 13 April, following a 1–0 win over Santos in Série A, he became the second goalkeeper in men's association football to keep 500 clean-sheets, only after Gianluigi Buffon.

Fábio was a member of the Fluminense team that competed in the 2025 FIFA Club World Cup, extending his record for the longest time playing in FIFA tournaments to 28 years, having first played one at the 1997 FIFA U-17 World Championship. In the club's opening match on 17 June, he kept a clean-sheet in a goalless draw with European side Borussia Dortmund, becoming, at the age of 44 years and 260 days, the oldest player in the tournament, being four full years older than the next closest, his teammate Thiago Silva (40y and 268d). This match also marked his 1,375th official appearance, which caused the American newspaper The Athletic to wrongly claim that he had surpassed Peter Shilton to become the outright all-time record holder for the most competitive appearances in world football. (Note: The Athletic revised Shilton's tally down to 1,374 matches by taking out the England U23 team from Shilton's record, while not doing the same for Fábio's Brazil U23 matches.) On 25 June, Fábio made two one-on-one saves to keep his 507th clean-sheet in a goalless draw with Mamelodi Sundowns, surpassing Buffon to become the goalkeeper with the most clean-sheets in football history. In the round of 16 on 30 June, he made four saves to keep yet another clean-sheet in a 2–0 victory over the UEFA Champions League runners-up Inter Milan.

On 18 July 2025, Fábio became the first footballer with 1,000 top-tier league matches.

On 20 August 2025, Fábio made his 1,391st career appearance across all competitions, a tally including friendlies that brought his Cruzeiro total to 976 matches, in Fluminense's 2–0 win over América de Cali in the Copa Sudamericana round of 16, thereby surpassing Peter Shilton's record for the most matches played by a professional footballer. He eventually featured in all 38 league matches in the 2025 season, becoming the only player to achieve this feat twice.

==== 2026-27 ====
On 1 January 2026, aged 45, Fábio renewed his contract with Fluminense until December 2027.

In May, he became the player with the most matches played in Copa Libertadores, after surpassing the record of Ever Almeida held since 1989.

== International career ==
Fábio was the starting goalkeeper in Brazil's winning campaigns at the 1997 U-17 South American Youth Championship and FIFA U-17 World Cup, where he featured alongside the likes of Ronaldinho. In the latter tournament, he kept a clean sheet against both Argentina and Germany in the knockout stages, and conceded only two goals in six games, from Oman and Ghana. He was also a member of the Brazil team that competed in the 1999 FIFA World Youth Championship, keeping a clean-sheet against the eventual champions Spain (2–0) in the group stage and against Croatia (4–0) in the Round of 16, but was unable to save a penalty from Fabián Canobbio that gave a 2–1 win to Uruguay in the quarter-finals.

Along with that, Fábio was an unused substitute in Brazil's squad in the 2003 FIFA Confederations Cup and in the winning side in the 2004 Copa América, in Peru. In August and September 2006, Fábio was called up by Brazilian head coach Dunga for a friendly against Norway in Oslo on 16 August 2006, which he did not play (1–1). Two weeks later, he remained an unused substitute against Argentina and Wales on 3 and 5 September, respectively, as Gomes remained 's number 1 under Dunga at that time.

He was included in one of Brazil's teams in September, but knew exactly where he stood and understood what his role in the team was, and stated he was happy to be part of the squad.

Brazil has great keepers as the level has really gone up over the past few years and we have goalies of the calibre of Rogério Ceni (São Paulo), Fábio Costa (Santos) and Júlio César (Internazionale). I just want to calmly do what I can to help the seleção.

— Fábio

After more than four years, Fábio was called up to the national team in 2011 for the friendly matches against Netherlands and Romania, failing to make his international debut in any of the matches. A few weeks later, he was included in the preliminary squad for the 2011 Copa América by coach Mano Menezes, but was eventually cut from the final squad of 23.

In 2013, he publicly complained about not having an opportunity to play for the national side and claimed that "it has no criteria in the goalkeepers selection". He made the same complaints in 2014, prior to the World Cup. In 2020, he stated that the national coaches selected the goalkeepers out of friendship and not merit. Some journalists as well as the Brazilian football fans criticize his exclusion from the national team even with the alternance of coaches in the past few years (Scolari, Dunga, Tite); Fabio is the most remembered player for this continued exclusion from the national team, along with winger Lucas Moura.

== Playing style ==
It was only at Fluminense, under the command of Fernando Diniz, that Fábio began playing a leading role in passing, improving his footwork considerably in order to fit in Diniz's possession-based approach. In his latter years, Fábio began avoiding the gym and weight trainings in order to maximize his rest, prioritizing his sleep instead, which although short (he has familial natural short sleep), is enough for his recovery.

== Appearances record ==
Fábio holds the all-time record for the most competitive appearances in world football, having played over 1,450 matches, and the most official appearances at club level, again with over 1,450. He is also the record holder for clean sheets, if taking into account only at professional level, with 521 clean sheets. Taking into account all levels, Ray Clemence of England holds the record, with 568 clean sheets.

== Career statistics ==
As of match played 19 November 2026

Appearances and goals by club, season and competition
Club	Season	League			State league (Note: Includes Campeonato Paranaense, Campeonato Carioca, Campeonato Mineiro)		Continental		Copa do Brasil		Other		Total	
Club	Season	Division	Apps	Goals	Apps	Goals	Apps	Goals	Apps	Goals	Apps	Goals	Apps	Goals
União Bandeirante	1997	Série C	10	0	20	0	—		—		—		30	0
Vasco da Gama	2000	Copa João Havelange	3	0	0	0	—		0	0	—		3	0
Vasco da Gama	2001	Série A	2	0	8	0	3 (Note: Appearances in Copa Libertadores)	0	—		—		13	0
Vasco da Gama	2002	Série A	21	0	2	0	—		3	0	1 (Note: Appearances in Copa dos Campeões)	0	27	0
Vasco da Gama	2003	Série A	44	0	15	0	2 (Note: Appearances in Copa Sudamericana)	0	7	0	—		68	0
Vasco da Gama	2004	Série A	19	0	16	0	—		4	0	—		39	0
Vasco da Gama	Total		89	0	41	0	5	0	14	0	1	0	150	0
Cruzeiro	2005	Série A	40	0	15	0	3	0	9	0	—		67	0
Cruzeiro	2006	Série A	36	0	15	0	1	0	6	0	—		58	0
Cruzeiro	2007	Série A	28	0	13	0	2	0	6	0	—		49	0
Cruzeiro	2008	Série A	38	0	14	0	10	0	—		—		62	0
Cruzeiro	2009	Série A	34	0	13	0	14	0	—		—		61	0
Cruzeiro	2010	Série A	36	0	12	0	12	0	—		—		60	0
Cruzeiro	2011	Série A	33	0	14	0	8	0	—		—		55	0
Cruzeiro	2012	Série A	37	0	12	0	—		5	0	—		54	0
Cruzeiro	2013	Série A	36	0	13	0	—		7	0	—		56	0
Cruzeiro	2014	Série A	36	0	13	0	10	0	8	0	—		67	0
Cruzeiro	2015	Série A	36	0	11	0	10	0	2	0	—		59	0
Cruzeiro	2016	Série A	19	0	12	0	—		5	0	2 (Note: Appearances in Primeira Liga)	0	38	0
Cruzeiro	2017	Série A	32	0	1	0	—		7	0	—		40	0
Cruzeiro	2018	Série A	30	0	13	0	9	0	8	0	—		60	0
Cruzeiro	2019	Série A	35	0	15	0	8	0	6	0	—		64	0
Cruzeiro	2020	Série B	36	0	11	0	—		4	0	—		51	0
Cruzeiro	2021	Série B	37	0	13	0	—		4	0	—		54	0
Cruzeiro	Total		579	0	210	0	87	0	77	0	2	0	955	0
Fluminense	2022	Série A	38	0	5	0	10	0	8	0	—		61	0
Fluminense	2023	Série A	35	0	13	0	13	0	4	0	2 (Note: Appearances in FIFA Club World Cup)	0	67	0
Fluminense	2024	Série A	37	0	6	0	10	0	4	0	2 (Note: Appearances in Recopa Sudamericana)	0	59	0
Fluminense	2025	Série A	38	0	12	0	8	0	10	0	6	0	74	0
Fluminense	2026	Série A	35	0	8	0	12	0	4	0	—		59	0
Fluminense	Total		183	0	44	0	53	0	30	0	10	0	320	0
Career total			861	0	315	0	145	0	121	0	13	0	1,455	0

== Honours ==
Atlético Paranaense

- Campeonato Paranaense: 1998

Vasco da Gama

- Série A: 2000
- Campeonato Carioca: 2003
- Copa Mercosur: 2000

Cruzeiro

- Série A: 2013, 2014
- Copa do Brasil: 2000, 2017, 2018
- Campeonato Mineiro: 2006, 2008, 2009, 2011, 2014, 2018, 2019
- Copa Libertadores runner-up: 2009

Fluminense

- Copa Libertadores: 2023
- Recopa Sudamericana: 2024
- Campeonato Carioca: 2022, 2023
- Taça Guanabara: 2022, 2023

Brazil U17

- FIFA U-17 World Cup: 1997
- South American U-17 Championship: 1997

Brazil

- Copa América: 2004

Individual

- Bola de Prata: 2010, 2013
- Campeonato Brasileiro Série A Team of the Year: 2010, 2013

== See also ==
- List of men's footballers with 1,000 or more official appearances
- List of world association football records
