= 2012 Oita Trinita season =

Oita Trinita
2012 season
- Manager: Kazuaki Tasaka
- Stadium: Oita Bank Dome
- J2 League: 6 th

2012 Oita Trinita season.

== J2 League ==
Match	Date	Team	Score	Team	Venue	Attendance
1	2012.03.04	Oita Trinita	2-3	Thespa Kusatsu	Oita Bank Dome	9,379
2	2012.03.11	Tochigi SC	0-3	Oita Trinita	Tochigi Green Stadium	4,148
3	2012.03.17	Montedio Yamagata	3-2	Oita Trinita	ND Soft Stadium Yamagata	6,315
4	2012.03.20	Oita Trinita	1-0	Fagiano Okayama	Oita Bank Dome	7,113
5	2012.03.25	FC Gifu	0-2	Oita Trinita	Gifu Nagaragawa Stadium	2,539
6	2012.04.01	Oita Trinita	1-0	Ehime FC	Oita Bank Dome	8,082
7	2012.04.08	Ventforet Kofu	1-0	Oita Trinita	Yamanashi Chuo Bank Stadium	9,651
8	2012.04.15	Oita Trinita	0-0	Tokushima Vortis	Oita Bank Dome	7,607
9	2012.04.22	Kataller Toyama	2-3	Oita Trinita	Toyama Stadium	2,003
10	2012.04.27	Kyoto Sanga FC	1-2	Oita Trinita	Kyoto Nishikyogoku Athletic Stadium	5,021
11	2012.04.30	Oita Trinita	0-0	Roasso Kumamoto	Oita Bank Dome	12,595
12	2012.05.03	Avispa Fukuoka	1-1	Oita Trinita	Level5 Stadium	7,637
13	2012.05.06	Oita Trinita	3-0	Gainare Tottori	Oita Bank Dome	8,085
14	2012.05.13	Shonan Bellmare	1-1	Oita Trinita	Shonan BMW Stadium Hiratsuka	6,111
15	2012.05.20	Oita Trinita	2-1	FC Machida Zelvia	Oita Bank Dome	7,253
16	2012.05.27	Oita Trinita	0-2	JEF United Chiba	Oita Bank Dome	10,747
17	2012.06.02	Tokyo Verdy	3-1	Oita Trinita	Ajinomoto Stadium	3,670
18	2012.06.09	Oita Trinita	2-0	Matsumoto Yamaga FC	Oita Bank Dome	8,019
19	2012.06.13	Yokohama FC	0-1	Oita Trinita	NHK Spring Mitsuzawa Football Stadium	2,639
20	2012.06.17	Oita Trinita	1-0	Mito HollyHock	Oita Bank Dome	6,459
21	2012.06.24	Giravanz Kitakyushu	0-2	Oita Trinita	Honjo Stadium	2,129
22	2012.07.01	Oita Trinita	1-1	Kataller Toyama	Oita Bank Dome	6,878
23	2012.07.08	Thespa Kusatsu	0-2	Oita Trinita	Shoda Shoyu Stadium Gunma	2,208
24	2012.07.15	Oita Trinita	1-4	Shonan Bellmare	Oita Bank Dome	10,137
25	2012.07.22	Oita Trinita	2-2	FC Gifu	Oita Bank Dome	8,871
26	2012.07.29	Ehime FC	1-2	Oita Trinita	Ningineer Stadium	3,502
27	2012.08.05	Tokushima Vortis	0-4	Oita Trinita	Pocarisweat Stadium	4,101
28	2012.08.12	Oita Trinita	0-1	Giravanz Kitakyushu	Oita Bank Dome	8,941
29	2012.08.19	Mito HollyHock	2-1	Oita Trinita	K's denki Stadium Mito	3,975
30	2012.08.22	Oita Trinita	2-1	Tokyo Verdy	Oita Bank Dome	7,007
31	2012.08.26	Fagiano Okayama	0-0	Oita Trinita	Kanko Stadium	9,237
32	2012.09.02	Oita Trinita	1-2	Ventforet Kofu	Oita Bank Dome	23,617
33	2012.09.14	Oita Trinita	2-0	Kyoto Sanga FC	Oita Bank Dome	6,534
34	2012.09.17	Roasso Kumamoto	2-1	Oita Trinita	Kumamoto Athletics Stadium	9,645
35	2012.09.23	Oita Trinita	0-1	Tochigi SC	Oita Bank Dome	9,027
36	2012.09.30	FC Machida Zelvia	1-3	Oita Trinita	Machida Stadium	2,859
37	2012.10.07	Oita Trinita	1-2	Yokohama FC	Oita Bank Dome	10,138
38	2012.10.14	JEF United Chiba	1-2	Oita Trinita	Fukuda Denshi Arena	11,966
39	2012.10.21	Gainare Tottori	1-0	Oita Trinita	Tottori Bank Bird Stadium	3,564
40	2012.10.28	Oita Trinita	1-0	Avispa Fukuoka	Oita Bank Dome	10,617
41	2012.11.04	Oita Trinita	3-0	Montedio Yamagata	Oita Bank Dome	17,028
42	2012.11.11	Matsumoto Yamaga FC	0-0	Oita Trinita	Matsumotodaira Park Stadium	12,956
