= Marquinhos Paraná =

Brazilian footballer

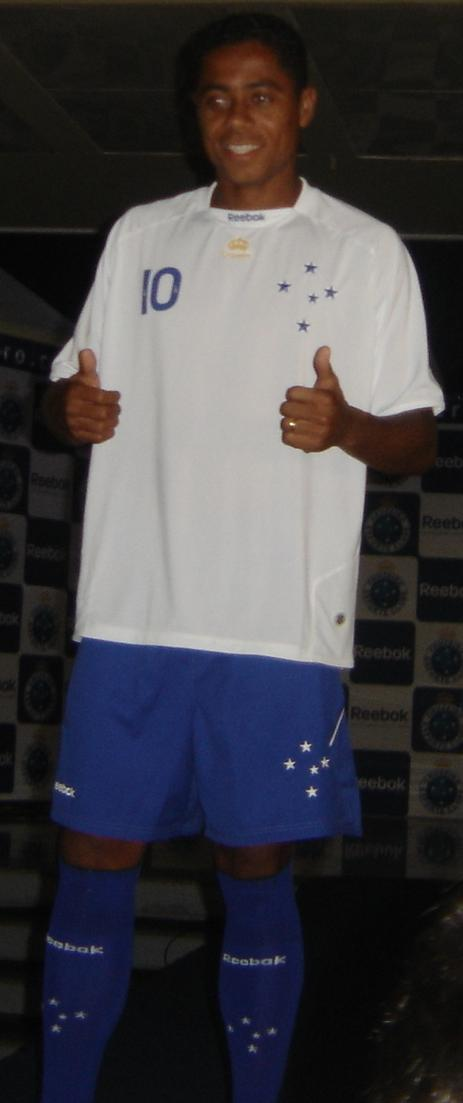

Personal information
- Full name: Antônio Marcos da Silva Filho
- Date of birth: 20 July 1977 (age 49)
- Place of birth: Recife, Brazil
- Height: 1.74 m (5 ft 9 in)
- Positions: Right-back; central midfielder

Youth career
- 1995–1996: Paraná

Senior career*
Years	Team	Apps	(Gls)
1996–1997	Paraná		
1998–2002	CRB		
1999	→ Santa Cruz (loan)		
2002	Figueirense		
2003	Marília	9	(1)
2004	Avaí	25	(2)
2005–2006	Figueirense	76	(4)
2007	Jubilo Iwata	28	(2)
2008–2011	Cruzeiro	128	(0)
2012	Sport	8	(1)
2012	América Mineiro	14	(0)
2013–2016	Ventforet Kofu	86	(0)
- * Club domestic league appearances and goals as of 10 June 2014

Antônio Marcos da Silva Filho known as Marquinhos Paraná or just Marquinhos (little Marcos; born 20 July 1977), is a former Brazilian right-back or defensive midfielder. He last played for Ventforet Kofu in the J. League Division 1.

== Biography ==
In January 2008, his contract with J. League Division 1 club Júbilo Iwata had expired, and he returned to Brazil for Cruzeiro. His team-mate Fabrício and Henrique also joined Marquinhos Paraná at Cruzeiro on loan.

In January 2010 he signed a new 2-year contract with club.

== Club career statistics ==
Club performance			League		Cup		League Cup		Total	
Season	Club	League	Apps	Goals	Apps	Goals	Apps	Goals	Apps	Goals
Brazil			League		Copa do Brasil		League Cup		Total	
2003	Marília	Série B	9	1					9	1
2004	Avaí	Série B	25	2					25	2
2005	Figueirense	Série A	39	2					39	2
2006	Figueirense	Série A	37	2					37	2
Japan			League		Emperor's Cup		J. League Cup		Total	
2007	Júbilo Iwata	J. League 1	28	2	1	0	5	0	34	2
Brazil			League		Copa do Brasil		League Cup		Total	
2008	Cruzeiro	Série A	34	0					34	0
2009	Cruzeiro	Série A	33	0					33	0
2010	Cruzeiro	Série A	26	0					26	0
2011	Cruzeiro	Série A	35	0					35	0
2012	Sport	Série A	8	1	2	0			10	1
2012	América Mineiro	Série B	14	0					14	0
Country	Brazil		251	8	2	0			253	8
Country	Japan		28	2	1	0	5	0	34	2
Total			279	10	3	0	5	0	287	10

== Honours ==
- Paraná State League: 1996, 1997
- Santa Catarina State League: 2006
- Minas Gerais State League: 2008, 2009, 2011
