= Jancarlos =

Brazilian footballer (1983–2013)

Personal information
- Full name: Jancarlos de Oliveira Barros
- Date of birth: 15 August 1983
- Place of birth: Natividade, Brazil
- Date of death: 22 November 2013 (aged 30)
- Height: 1.75 m (5 ft 9 in)
- Position: Right-back

Youth career
- 1999–2000: Fluminense

Senior career*
Years	Team	Apps	(Gls)
2001–2003	Fluminense	40	(1)
2004	→ Juventude (Loan)	36	(1)
2005–2008	Atlético Paranaense	78	(8)
2008–2009	São Paulo	14	(1)
2009	Cruzeiro	11	(0)
2010	Botafogo		
2010	→ Bahia (Loan)		
2011	Bahia		
2012	Ituano		
2012	America-RJ		
2013	Volta Redonda		
2013	Rio Branco-ES		
- * Club domestic league appearances and goals

Jancarlos de Oliveira Barros or simply Jancarlos (August 15, 1983 – November 22, 2013) was a Brazilian footballer who played as a right-back.

== Career ==
Jancarlos was born in Natividade. In January 2010 the 26-year-old defender, having spent the previous year at Cruzeiro, signed a two-year deal with Botafogo. He played from 2005 to 2009 for São Paulo.

== Honours ==
Fluminense

- Rio de Janeiro State League: 2002

Atlético Paranaense

- Paraná State League: 2005

São Paulo

- Brazilian League: 2008
