= Eliandro =

Brazilian footballer (born 1990)

Personal information
- Full name: Eliandro dos Santos Gonzaga
- Date of birth: April 23, 1990 (age 36)
- Place of birth: São Paulo, Brazil
- Height: 1.81 m (5 ft 11 1/2 in)
- Position: Striker

Youth career
- –2009: Cruzeiro

Senior career*
Years	Team	Apps	(Gls)
2009–2014	Cruzeiro	10	(3)
2010	→ Sport Recife (loan)	12	(1)
2011	→ América-MG (loan)	10	(1)
2011	→ ABC (loan)	2	(0)
2012	→ Villa Nova (loan)	10	(2)
2012	→ Ipatinga (loan)	6	(0)
2012–2013	→ Nacional (loan)	2	(0)
2014	Cabofriense	7	(0)
2014–2015	Birkirkara	16	(2)
2015	Žalgiris	11	(3)
2016	Batatais	19	(9)
2016	Bragantino	16	(3)
2016–2017	Guarani	37	(11)
2017–2018	Ferroviária	9	(0)
2018	Remo	8	(0)
2018–2020	Chiangmai	29	(12)
2020	Suphanburi	13	(4)
2020–2021	Chonburi	13	(4)
2021	Samut Prakan City	15	(3)
2022	East Bengal	7	(0)
- * Club domestic league appearances and goals as of 07:49, 5 January 2023 (UTC)

Eliandro dos Santos Gonzaga (born 23 April 1990) is a Brazilian professional footballer who plays as a forward.

== Career ==
Eliandro was born in São Paulo and was formed in the basic categories of the Cruzeiro. In 2009 because of injuries to Kléber and Wellington Paulista won chance in the team. But after not too many chances early in the Campeonato Brasileiro 2010, was loaned to the Sport Club do Recife, the race of the Campeonato Brasileiro Série B of 2010.

=== East Bengal ===
In August 2022, Eliandro was announced as one of the five foreigners signed by East Bengal for the upcoming season.

On 25 August, he made his debut against Rajasthan United in the Durand Cup, which ended in a 0–0 stalemate. He came on as a 68th-minute substitute for VP Suhair.

== Career statistics ==
=== Club ===
As of 30 December 2022

Club	Season	League			Cup		Others		Continental		Total	
Club	Season	Division	Apps	Goals	Apps	Goals	Apps	Goals	Apps	Goals	Apps	Goals
Cruzeiro	2009	Série A	4	2	0	0	—		—		4	2
Cruzeiro	2010	Série A	1	0	0	0	5 (Note: Appearance(s) in Campeonato Mineiro)	0	3 (Note: Appearance(s) in Copa Libertadores)	1	9	1
Cruzeiro	Cruzeiro total		5	2	0	0	5	0	3	1	13	3
Sport Recife (loan)	2010	Série B	12	1	0	0	—		—		12	1
América-MG (loan)	2011	Série A	7	0	0	0	3	1	—		10	1
ABC (loan)	2011	Série B	2	0	0	0	—		—		2	0
Villa Nova (loan)	2012	Campeonato Mineiro	10	2	0	0	—		—		10	2
Ipatinga (loan)	2012	Série B	6	0	0	0	—		—		6	0
Nacional (loan)	2012–13	Liga Portugal 1	2	0	0	0	—		—		2	0
Cabofriense	2014	Carioca Série A	7	0	0	0	—		—		7	0
Birkirkara	2014–15	Maltese Premier League	16	2	2 (Note: Appearance(s) in Maltese Super Cup) (Note: Appearance(s) in Maltese FA Trophy)	1	—		—		18	3
Žalgiris	2015	A Lyga	11	3	1 (Note: Appearance(s) in Lithuanian Football Cup)	0	—		—		12	3
Batatais	2016	Paulista Série A2	19	9	0	0	—		—		19	9
Bragantino	2016	Série B	16	3	3 (Note: Appearance(s) in Copa do Brasil)	0	3 (Note: Appearance(s) in Paulista Série A1)	1	—		22	4
Guarani	2016	Série C	6	2	0	0	—		—		6	2
Guarani	2017	Série B	20	3	0	0	11 (Note: Appearance(s) in Paulista Série A2)	6	—		31	9
Guarani	Guarani total		26	5	0	0	11	6	0	0	37	11
Ferroviária	2018	Paulista Série A1	9	0	0	0	—		—		9	0
Remo	2018	Série C	8	0	0	0	—		—		8	0
Chiangmai	2019	Thai League 1	29	12	1 (Note: Appearance(s) in Thai FA Cup)	0	—		—		30	12
Suphanburi	2020–21	Thai League 1	13	4	2	4	—		—		15	8
Chonburi	2020–21	Thai League 1	13	4	4	4	—		—		17	8
Samut Prakan City	2021–22	Thai League 1	15	3	1	0	—		—		16	3
East Bengal	2022–23	Indian Super League	7	0	3 (Note: Appearance(s) in Durand Cup)	0	—		—		10	0
Career total			233	50	17	9	22	8	3	1	275	68
