= Marquinhos (footballer, born 1992) =

Brazilian footballer

Personal information
- Full name: Marcos Vinícius Bento
- Date of birth: April 1, 1992 (age 34)
- Place of birth: Franca, Brazil
- Height: 1.77 m (5 ft 9 1/2 in)
- Position: Midfielder

Team information
- Current team: Palmeiras B

Youth career
- Cruzeiro
- 2008: Itaúna (loan)

Senior career*
Years	Team	Apps	(Gls)
2010–	Cruzeiro	1	(0)
2011	→ Villa Nova (loan)	0	(0)
2011–2012	→ Nacional-MG (loan)		
2012	→ ASA (loan)		
2012–	→ Palmeiras B (loan)		
- * Club domestic league appearances and goals as of May 21, 2013

Marcos Vinícius Bento, the Marquinhos (born 1 April 1992 in Franca) is a midfielder who plays in the Palmeiras B.

== Career ==
Played in the Cruzeiro.

=== Career statistics ===
(Correct as of October 16, 2010)

Club	Season	State League		Brazilian Série A		Copa do Brasil		Copa Sudamericana		Total	
Club	Season	Apps	Goals	Apps	Goals	Apps	Goals	Apps	Goals	Apps	Goals
Cruzeiro	2010	0	0	1	0	-	-	-	-	1	0
Total		0	0	1	0	-	-	-	-	1	0

== Contract ==
- Cruzeiro.
