= Pará (footballer, born 1987) =

Brazilian footballer

Personal information
- Full name: Erinaldo Santos Rabelo
- Date of birth: September 19, 1987 (age 39)
- Place of birth: Rio Maria, Brazil
- Height: 1.72 m (5 ft 7 1/2 in)
- Position: Left back

Team information
- Current team: Sampaio Corrêa

Youth career
- 2004: Grêmio
- 2005: São Caetano

Senior career*
Years	Team	Apps	(Gls)
2005–2008	São Caetano	0	(0)
2008–2010	Bragantino	17	(3)
2009	→ Vasco da Gama (loan)	4	(0)
2010	→ Paraná (loan)	3	(1)
2010–2011	Avaí	26	(1)
2012	→ América Mineiro (loan)	23	(2)
2013	Joinville	16	(1)
2014	Avaí	4	(0)
2014–2015	Bragantino	16	(0)
2015	Penapolense	17	(2)
2016–2018	Juventude	101	(1)
2019	Brasil de Pelotas	9	(2)
2020–2022	São Bernardo	34	(2)
2022	→ Sampaio Corrêa (loan)	21	(1)
2023–	Sampaio Corrêa	13	(0)
- * Club domestic league appearances and goals as of November 4, 2023

Erinaldo Rabelo Santos, better known as Pará (born September 19, 1987), is a Brazilian footballer who plays as a left-back for Sampaio Corrêa.

== Career ==
Pará began his career in 2004 working in the youth has faded. Soon after this, the following year, he moved to Sao Caetano where he started working as a professional.

He spent time on loan at Union and St. John to reach the Uniclinic Bragantino, where he had an appearance on the national scene. He was then loaned to Vasco da Gama and, soon after, to Paraná.

For the second half of the 2010 season, was announced as strengthening Avaí.

=== Career statistics ===
(Correct as of October 16, 2010)

Club	Season	State League		Brazilian Série A		Copa do Brasil		Copa Libertadores		Copa Sudamericana		Total	
Club	Season	Apps	Goals	Apps	Goals	Apps	Goals	Apps	Goals	Apps	Goals	Apps	Goals
Avaí	2010	-	-	0	0	-	-	-	-	-	-	0	0
Total		-	-	0	0	-	-	-	-	-	-	0	0

== Honours ==
Vasco da Gama

- Campeonato Brasileiro Série B: 2009

São Bernardo

- Campeonato Paulista Série A2: 2021

== Contract ==
- Avaí.
