= Flávio (footballer, born 1985) =

Brazilian footballer

Personal information
- Full name: Flávio Henrique Esteves Guedes
- Date of birth: 5 March 1985 (age 41)
- Place of birth: Teófilo Otoni, Brazil
- Height: 1.90 m (6 ft 3 in)
- Position: Goalkeeper

Team information
- Current team: Cruzeiro B

Youth career
- 1999–2005: Cruzeiro

Senior career*
Years	Team	Apps	(Gls)
2006–	Cruzeiro	2	(0)
2007–2008	→ Cabofriense (loan)		
2008–2009	→ Botafogo (loan)	4	(0)
2011	→ Oeste (loan)		
2011	→ Luverdense (loan)		
- * Club domestic league appearances and goals

Flávio Henrique Esteves Guedes (born 5 March 1985), or simply Flávio, is a Brazilian professional footballer who plays as a goalkeeper for Cruzeiro reserve team.
