= Fernandinho (footballer, born April 1981) =

Brazilian footballer

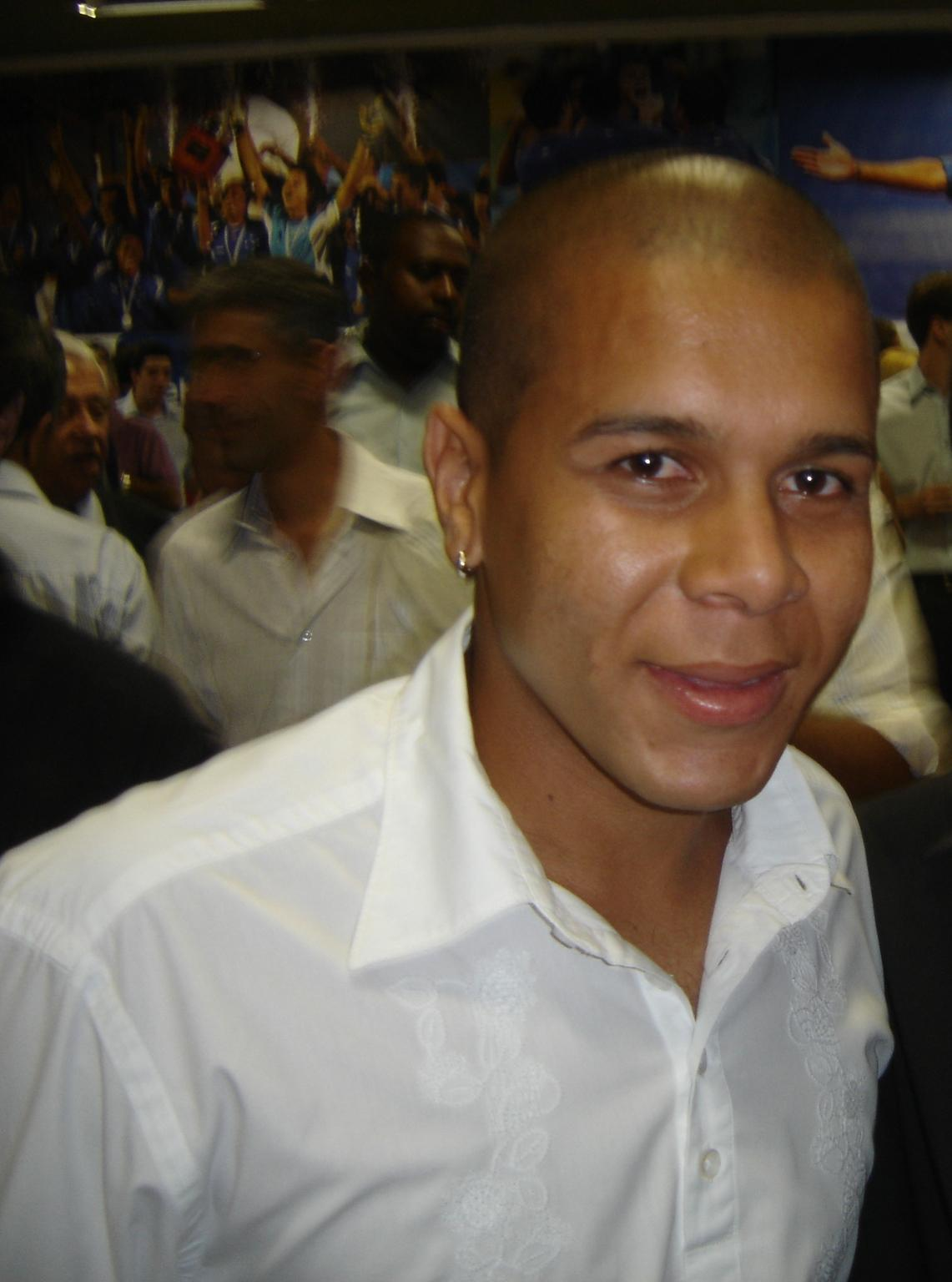

Personal information
- Full name: Fernando Alves Santa Clara
- Date of birth: April 16, 1981 (age 45)
- Place of birth: Ilhéus, Brazil
- Height: 1.72 m (5 ft 8 in)
- Position: Left-back

Youth career
- 1997: Catuense
- 1998: Vitória

Senior career*
Years	Team	Apps	(Gls)
1999–2002	Vitória	10	(0)
2002	→ FC Porto (Loan)	10	(0)
2002	Joinville		
2003	→ Caxias (Loan)		
2003	Paraná	41	(7)
2004–2007	Criciúma	20	(6)
2005	→ Vasco da Gama (Loan)	18	(3)
2007–2010	Cruzeiro	47	(5)
2010	Atlético Mineiro	8	(0)
2011	Joinville	12	(1)
2011	Vitória	31	(2)
2012	Paraná	32	(5)
2013	São Caetano	17	(1)
2014	Fortaleza	30	(0)
2015–2016	Ceará	29	(2)
2016–2017	Joinville	32	(0)
- * Club domestic league appearances and goals

Fernando Alves Santa Clara or simply Fernandinho (born April 16, 1981), is a Brazilian former professional footballer who played as a left-back.

== Career ==
Fernandinho was born in Ilhéus. He began his professional career with Vitória in 1999. After impressing with the Brazilian side, he drew the interest of top Portuguese side FC Porto and joined them on loan in 2002. Following a brief stay in Portugal in which Fernandinho played for the Porto reserves he returned to Brazil joining Série C side Joinville and in 2003 played for Caxias.

Fernandinho then moved up joining Campeonato Brasileiro Série A Club Paraná and started demonstrating his offensive prowess, scoring 7 goals in 41 matches. In 2004, he joined Criciúma which was playing in Série A and appeared in 14 matches scoring 5 goals playing primarily as a left-sided midfielder. After being relegated with Criciúma Fernandinho was loaned to top side Vasco da Gama and appeared in 18 league matches scoring 3 goals. He then returned to Criciúma now playing in Série C in 2006. Upon joining Criciúma he began playing exclusively at left-back and was a key offensive player for the side, scoring 12 goals in all competitions. In 2007 for Criciúma he added another 10 goals in the Campeonato Catarinense and was selected as the top left-back and top overall player of the Campeonato Catarinense being noted for his powerful shot and attacking ability.

This led to renewed interest from top Brazilian clubs and during the 2007 season Fernandinho's contract was purchased by top Brazilian side Cruzeiro. With Cruzeiro, Fernandinho quickly established himself as the club's starting left-back and helped them capture the 2008 and 2009 Minas Gerais State League. He suffered an ACL injury in 2009 which kept him out of action for most of the 2009 season, however upon returning he drew interest from top European clubs AC Milan and Fenerbache, which considered him a possible replacement for the departed Roberto Carlos. In June 2010, Fernandinho was announced as Atlético Mineiro's new player. He signed the club after being released from Cruzeiro.

He joined Vitória, where he began his professional career, for a second spell on 23 May 2011.

== Honours ==
Vitória

- Bahia State League: 1999, 2000
- Northeastern Cup: 1999

Criciúma

- Santa Catarina State League: 2005
- Brazilian League (3rd division): 2006

Cruzeiro

- Minas Gerais State League: 2008, 2009
