= Fabinho (footballer, born 1980) =

Brazilian footballer

Personal information
- Full name: Fábio Alves Félix
- Date of birth: 10 January 1980 (age 46)
- Place of birth: São Bernardo do Campo, Brazil
- Height: 1.86 m (6 ft 1 in)
- Position: Defensive midfielder

Youth career
- 1998–1999: São Caetano

Senior career*
Years	Team	Apps	(Gls)
1999–2000	São Caetano		
2001–2004	Corinthians	119	(10)
2005	Cerezo Osaka	23	(7)
2006	Santos	23	(2)
2006–2009	Toulouse	39	(6)
2008–2009	→ Corinthians (loan)	28	(3)
2009–2010	Cruzeiro	34	(1)
2011	Yokohama FC	4	(1)
2011–2012	Bahia	52	(1)
2013	São Caetano		

Managerial career
- 2017–2019: Corinthians (assistant)
- 2020: São Caetano
- 2023: Inter de Limeira (assistant)
- 2023: Inter de Limeira (interim)
- 2023: Juventude (assistant)
- 2024: Portuguesa (assistant)
- 2024: Guarani-SP (assistant)
- 2026: Santo André (assistant)
- * Club domestic league appearances and goals

Fábio Alves Félix (born 10 January 1980), commonly known as Fabinho, is a Brazilian football manager and former player who played as a defensive midfielder.

He played for Corinthians, Santos, Cruzeiro and Bahia in the Campeonato Brasileiro Série A, winning several state and national honours, mainly in his two spells at Corinthians. He also had brief spells in Japan with Cerezo Osaka and Yokohama FC, as well as in France with Toulouse, where he contributed to third place and UEFA Champions League qualification in 2006–07.

Fabinho began coaching as an assistant at Corinthians in 2017, and was manager of São Caetano in 2020 and interim manager of Inter de Lameira in 2023.

== Playing career ==
=== Early career ===
Born in São Bernardo do Campo in São Paulo state, Fabinho began his career at São Caetano in 1999. In 2000, he helped the club win the Campeonato Paulista Série A2 and finish runners-up of the Copa João Havelange.

In 2001, Fabinho signed for Corinthians, where he won the Torneio Rio–São Paulo and the Copa do Brasil under Carlos Alberto Parreira in 2002, and the Campeonato Paulista in 2003. At the start of 2005, he was approached by Toulouse, but opted for Cerezo Osaka in Japan. Later that year he was close to joining another French club, Lyon, but they signed Tiago Mendes to their midfield instead.

=== Santos, Toulouse and Corinthians ===
At the start of 2006, Fabinho returned to his country by signing for Santos. That July, he joined Toulouse on a three-year contract. In 2006–07, he featured in Toulouse's best season in Ligue 1, third place with UEFA Champions League qualification. He played a total of 39 matches for Toulouse, scoring 6 goals.

Fabinho was loaned back to Corinthians in January 2008 for 18 months, in exchange for Eduardo Ratinho moving in the opposite direction to Toulouse. Corinthians won the Campeonato Brasileiro Série B that year, followed by the Campeonato Paulista and Copa do Brasil in 2009, under manager Mano Menezes.

=== Cruzeiro ===
In May 2009, Fabinho ended his deal with Corinthians, and was reported to be nearing a deal with Parreira's Fluminense. In June however, he signed for Cruzeiro, where stated that he was not signed as a replacement for Ramires, who had left for Benfica. On his debut on 21 June, he was sent off in a 4–2 home loss to Barueri as his club rested players for the Copa Libertadores; they finished as runners-up in the continental competition.

=== Later career ===
Fabinho went back to Japan at the start of 2011 to play for Yokohama FC in the J2 League. He was badly affected mentally by the 2011 Tōhoku earthquake and tsunami, and began to negotiate for a return home. On 4 July, he signed for Bahia. After playing 22 games in the national top flight for the rest of the year, he extended his contract for 2012. The team won the Campeonato Baiano in May that year, defeating Vitória after a 3–3 aggregate draw in the final, due to having the better regular season.

At the end of February 2013, 33-year-old Fabinho returned to São Caetano after 12 years away. He arrived with the team in the relegation zone of the Campeonato Paulista, and intended to retire after the next year's edition.

== Coaching career ==
At the start of 2017, Fabinho was hired as under-17 assistant manager at Corinthians. He was promoted to the same role for the first team under Fábio Carille; both were dismissed in November 2019 after a 4–1 loss to Flamengo. In August 2020, he was hired as a coordinator at another of his former clubs, São Caetano.

In October 2022, Fabinho moved to Inter de Limeira as assistant to Pintado. When Pintado departed for Juventude, Fabinho was caretaker manager for two Campeonato Paulista games in March 2023 before making the same move. In February 2024, the pair were appointed at Portuguesa.

Fabinho assisted Maurício Copertino at Santo André in the Paulista A2 in 2026. The pair left by mutual consent on 26 February, with two games remaining and five points off the playoffs.

== Personal life ==
Fabinho has polydactylism, which means he has an extra finger on each hand.

== Career statistics ==
Appearances and goals by club, season and competition
Club	Season	League		
Club	Season	Division	Apps	Goals
Corinthians	2001	Série A	21	1
Corinthians	2002	Série A	22	1
Corinthians	2003	Série A	37	4
Corinthians	2004	Série A	37	6
Corinthians	Total		117	12
Cerezo Osaka	2005	J1 League	23	7
Santos	2006	Série A	5	0
Toulouse	2006–07	Ligue 1	30	4
Toulouse	2007–08	Ligue 1	9	1
Toulouse	Total		39	5
Corinthians	2008	Série B	12	1
Corinthians	2009	Série A	26	2
Corinthians	Total		38	3
Cruzeiro	2009	Série A	17	0
Cruzeiro	2010	Série A	17	1
Cruzeiro	Total		34	1
Yokohama FC	2011	J2 League	4	1
Career total			260	29

== Honours ==
São Caetano

- Campeonato Paulista Série A2: 2000

Corinthians

- Torneio Rio–São Paulo: 2002
- Copa do Brasil: 2002, 2009
- Campeonato Paulista: 2003, 2009
- Campeonato Brasileiro Série B: 2008

Bahia

- Campeonato Baiano: 2012
