= Diego Renan =

Brazilian footballer (born 1990)

Personal information
- Full name: Diego Renan de Lima Ferreira
- Date of birth: 26 January 1990 (age 36)
- Place of birth: Surubim, Brazil
- Height: 1.71 m (5 ft 7 in)
- Position: Full back

Youth career
- 2004–2008: Cruzeiro

Senior career*
Years	Team	Apps	(Gls)
2008–2016	Cruzeiro	107	(7)
2013	→ Criciúma (loan)	0	(0)
2014	→ Vasco da Gama (loan)	31	(0)
2015–2016	→ Vitória (loan)	67	(8)
2017	Chapecoense	8	(0)
2018	Figueirense	29	(1)
2019	Ponte Preta	35	(2)
2020–2021	CSA	45	(0)
2021	Avaí	50	(1)
2022	CSA	43	(0)
2023–	Vila Nova	17	(1)
- * Club domestic league appearances and goals as of 30 January 2022

Diego Renan de Lima Ferreira (born 26 January 1990), known as Diego Renan, is a Brazilian footballer who plays for as a full back.

== Career ==
Born in Surubim, Pernambuco, Diego Renan made his professional debut for Cruzeiro in a 1-1 away draw to Ituiutaba in the Campeonato Mineiro on March 27, 2008.

On 4 January 2017, after the expiration of his contract with Cruzeiro, Diego Renan signed with Chapecoense.

== Career statistics ==
As of 4 January 2017

Club	Season	League			State League		Cup		Conmebol		Other		Total	
Club	Season	Division	Apps	Goals	Apps	Goals	Apps	Goals	Apps	Goals	Apps	Goals	Apps	Goals
Cruzeiro	2008	Série A	0	0	1	0	—		0	0	—		1	0
Cruzeiro	2009	Série A	29	3	1	0	—		0	0	—		30	3
Cruzeiro	2010	Série A	28	0	10	0	—		12	1	—		50	1
Cruzeiro	2011	Série A	19	0	8	1	—		4	0	—		31	1
Cruzeiro	2012	Série A	25	1	10	0	4	0	—		—		39	1
Cruzeiro	Subtotal		101	4	30	1	4	0	16	1	—		151	6
Criciúma	2013	Série A	0	0	13	0	0	0	—		—		13	0
Vasco da Gama	2014	Série B	31	0	11	0	5	1	—		—		47	1
Vitória	2015	Série B	34	4	0	0	2	0	—		—		36	4
Vitória	2016	Série A	33	4	12	4	5	2	2	1	—		52	11
Vitória	Subtotal		67	8	12	4	7	2	2	1	—		88	15
Career total			199	12	66	5	16	3	18	2	0	0	299	22

== Honours ==
Cruzeiro

- Campeonato Mineiro: 2008, 2009, 2011

Criciúma

- Campeonato Catarinense: 2013

Vitória

- Campeonato Baiano: 2016

Chapecoense

- Campeonato Catarinense: 2017

Figueirense

- Campeonato Catarinense: 2018

Avaí

- Campeonato Catarinense: 2021
