= Alessandro (footballer, born March 1982) =

Brazilian footballer

Personal information
- Full name: Alessandro Nunes Nascimento
- Date of birth: 2 March 1982 (age 44)
- Place of birth: São João da Boa Vista, Brazil
- Height: 1.77 m (5 ft 9 1/2 in)
- Position: Striker

Youth career
- 1999–2000: América (MG)

Senior career*
Years	Team	Apps	(Gls)
2000–2002	América (MG)	19	(2)
2002–2003	Feyenoord	0	(0)
2003–2004	América (MG)	0	(0)
2004	Fluminense	28	(6)
2005–2008	Tombense	0	(0)
2005	→ Flamengo (loan)	0	(0)
2005–2006	→ Lierse (loan)	28	(4)
2006–2007	→ Juventude (loan)	2	(0)
2007	→ Vasco (loan)	2	(1)
2007–2008	→ Ipatinga (loan)	32	(25)
2008	→ Albirex Niigata (loan)	30	(13)
2009	Cruzeiro	0	(0)
2009	Tombense	0	(0)
2009	→ Atlético Mineiro (loan)	16	(2)
2010	Ipatinga	35	(21)
2011	Sport	7	(1)
2011	Ipatinga	10	(6)
2011– 2013	América (MG)	71	(29)
2014	Kyoto Sanga FC	7	(2)
2014	Bahia	1	(0)
- * Club domestic league appearances and goals

Alessandro Nunes Nascimento or simply Alessandro (born 2 March 1982) is a Brazilian former football striker.

He became the Campeonato Brasileiro Série B 2007's top scorer with 25 goals.

== Club career ==
Alessandro was signed by Tombense in February 2005 on a 4-year contract. He signed another a 3-year in January 2008.

It is being reported that Ecuadorian Giants Barcelona Sporting Club have scouted Alessandro Nunes Nascimento and are going to ask Atlético Mineiro for a loan for the 2010 season.

On 8 January 2011, Alessandro has agreed to contract with Série B club Sport Recife in Brazil but in a month, he rescinded his contract and rejoined his previous club Ipatinga.

On 16 May 2011, Alessandro signed a contract with Série A side América Mineiro for the third spell. América announced he would stay at the club until 25 December 2012.

== Honors ==
=== Individual Honors ===
- Campeonato Brasileiro Série B Top Scorer: 2007
