= Léo Fortunato =

Brazilian footballer

Personal information
- Full name: Leonardo Fortunato dos Santos
- Date of birth: 14 March 1983 (age 43)
- Place of birth: Rio de Janeiro, Brazil
- Height: 1.84 m (6 ft 0 in)
- Position: Centre-back

Senior career*
| Years | Team | Apps | (Gls) |
| 2004 | Madureira | | |
| 2004 | São Bento | | |
| 2005–2007 | Madureira | | |
| 2006 | → Olaria (loan) | | |
| 2006 | → Bangu (loan) | | |
| 2007–2012 | Cruzeiro | 35 | (0) |
| 2010 | → Braga (loan) | 2 | (0) |
| 2011 | → Vitória (loan) | 24 | (1) |
| 2012 | Boa Esporte | 1 | (0) |
| 2012 | Madureira | 6 | (0) |
| 2013 | Novo Hamburgo | 6 | (1) |
| 2013–2014 | Zakho | | (1) |
| 2014–2015 | Pietà Hotspurs | 31 | (2) |
| 2016 | Tupi | | |
| 2016–2017 | ABC | 37 | (1) |
| 2018 | Itumbiara | 0 | (0) |
| 2018 | Tigres do Brasil | | |
- * Club domestic league appearances and goals

Leonardo "Léo" Fortunato dos Santos (born 14 March 1983) is a Brazilian former professional football who played as a centre-back.

== Honours ==
- Taça Rio: 2006
- Campeonato Mineiro: 2008
