= Uberabão =

Multi-use stadium in Uberaba, Minas Gerais, Brazil

Coordinates: 19°44′22″S 47°56′23″W

Estádio João Guido
- Uberabão
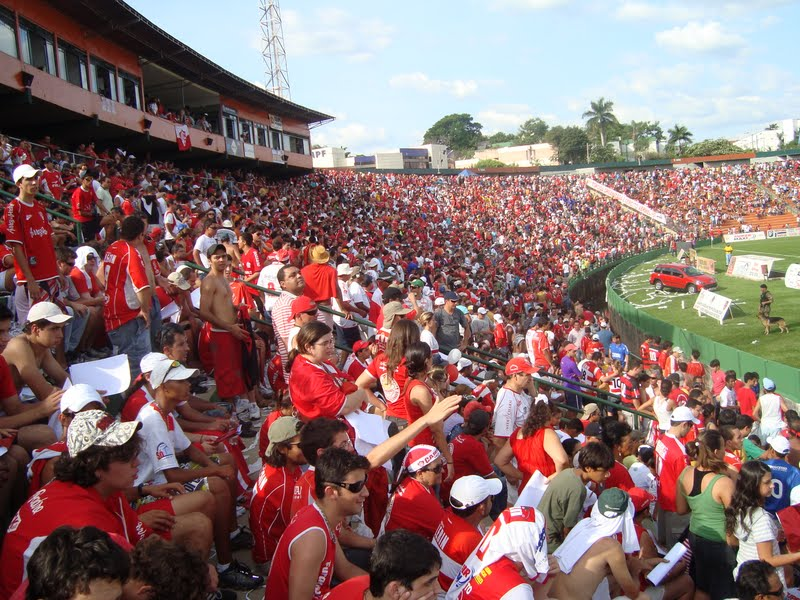
- Sisbrace
- Interactive map of Estádio João Guido
- Full name: Estádio Municipal João Guido
- Location: Uberaba, Minas Gerais, Brazil
- Owner: Municipality of Uberaba
- Capacity: 25,000

Construction
- Opened: 1972

Tenant
- Uberaba

Estádio Municipal João Guido, usually known as Uberabão, is a multi-use stadium in Uberaba, Minas Gerais, Brazil. It is currently used mostly for football matches. The stadium holds 25,000 people. It was built in 1972. The stadium is owned by the Town Hall of Uberaba, and its formal name honors João Guido, who was Uberaba's mayor during the stadium construction.

== History ==
In 1971, Uberaba's Town Hall, excited with the possibility of having a team from the city competing in the Campeonato Brasileiro, decided to build a football stadium. With the financial support of the entrepreneur Edgar Rodrigues da Cunha, the stadium was quickly built, being inaugurated in the following year.

The inaugural match was played on June 10, 1972, when the Brazil national football team beat the Brazil olympic team 2–1. The first goal of the stadium was scored by Brazil's Rivellino.

Single stage of the world with a river surrounding the field

The stadium's attendance record currently stands at 30,700 people, set on May 23, 1976, when Cruzeiro beat Uberaba 4–2.
