= Henrique (footballer, born 16 May 1985) =

Brazilian footballer

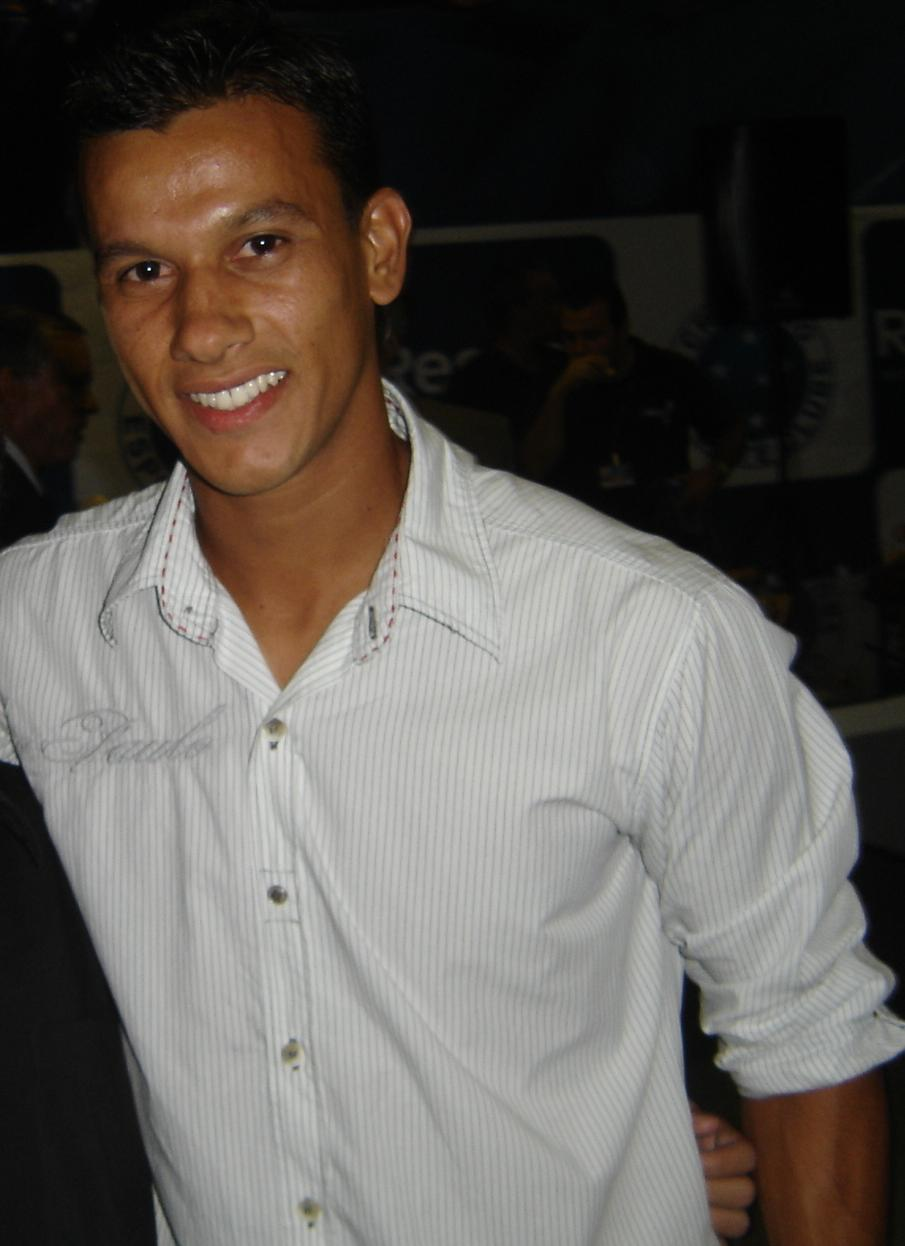

Personal information
- Full name: Henrique Pacheco de Lima
- Date of birth: 16 May 1985 (age 41)
- Place of birth: Londrina, Brazil
- Height: 1.80 m (5 ft 11 in)
- Position: Defensive midfielder

Team information
- Current team: Figueirense (assistant)

Youth career
- Coritiba

Senior career*
Years	Team	Apps	(Gls)
2005	Londrina	1	(0)
2005–2007	Junior Team Futebol	0	(0)
2005–2007	→ Figueirense (loan)	43	(3)
2007–2008	Júbilo Iwata	13	(0)
2008–2011	Cruzeiro	98	(8)
2011–2013	Santos	45	(1)
2013–2021	Cruzeiro	255	(8)
2020	→ Fluminense (loan)	4	(0)

Managerial career
- 2025: Pouso Alegre (interim)
- 2025–: Figueirense (assistant)
- 2026: Figueirense (interim)
- * Club domestic league appearances and goals

Henrique Pacheco de Lima (born 16 May 1985), simply known as Henrique, is a Brazilian football coach and former player who played as a defensive midfielder. He is the current assistant coach of Figueirense.

== Club career ==
Born in Londrina, Paraná, Henrique started his professional career at Londrina Esporte Clube. He signed a professional contract with Londrina Junior Team on 1 September 2004, the affiliated club of Londrina (later became an independent club). He was loaned back to Londrina in 2004 and in January 2005 after extended his contract with the junior team. He played once in 2004 Campeonato Brasileiro Série B (on 25 September) and once in 2005 Copa do Brasil and left the club after the end of 2005 Campeonato Paranaense. He was loaned to Figueirense. and the loan was renewed on 1 February 2006 and 6 June. He also renewed his contract with the junior team on the same day.

In August 2007, he was transferred to J1 League club Júbilo Iwata. He then loaned back to Cruzeiro for 2008 season, along with Fabrício de Souza. In January 2009, the loan renewed. In the 2009 Copa Libertadores Final, Henrique scored the opening goal for Cruzeiro from over 18 yards out. However, Cruzeiro lost the game and the championship to Estudiantes de La Plata.

In January 2010, Cruzeiro bought him outright. He signed a new 5-year deal with the club. In March 2011, he got a call from Mano Menezes to be part of the Brazilian soccer squad for the first time.

On 3 January 2013, after two years playing for Santos, Henrique comes back to Cruzeiro.

== Club statistics ==
As of 7 December 2018

Club	Season	League			State League		National Cup		Continental		Other		Total	
Club	Season	Division	Apps	Goals	Apps	Goals	Apps	Goals	Apps	Goals	Apps	Goals	Apps	Goals
Cruzeiro	2008	Série A	26	2	2	0	—		4	0	—		32	2
Cruzeiro	2009	Série A	32	2	10	0	—		12	2	—		54	4
Cruzeiro	2010	Série A	35	4	1	0	—		12	0	—		48	4
Cruzeiro	2011	Série A	5	0	4	1	—		8	0	—		17	1
Cruzeiro	Total		98	8	17	1	—		36	2	—		151	11
Santos	2011	Série A	23	0	—		—		—		2	0	25	0
Santos	2012	Série A	22	0	13	0	—		11	1	—		46	1
Santos	Total		45	0	13	0	—		11	1	2	0	71	1
Cruzeiro	2013	Série A	9	0	—		—		—		—		9	0
Cruzeiro	2014	Série A	30	0	9	0	6	2	6	0	—		51	2
Cruzeiro	2015	Série A	31	1	11	1	2	0	10	1	—		54	3
Cruzeiro	2016	Série A	31	4	13	0	9	2	—		—		53	6
Cruzeiro	2017	Série A	28	0	12	2	12	0	1	0	—		53	2
Cruzeiro	2018	Série A	19	0	13	0	8	1	10	0	—		50	1
Cruzeiro	Total		148	5	58	3	37	5	27	1	—		270	14
Career total			286	13	88	4	37	5	74	4	2	0	487	26

== International career ==
Henrique was called up by Brazil for the first time in 2011, by coach Mano Menezes, for a friendly game against Scotland. He knew this when he was flying. On 19 January 2017 he returned to the Brazilian team, being called up by coach Tite for a friendly game against Colombia.

== Honours ==
=== Club ===
Cruzeiro

- Campeonato Mineiro: 2008, 2009, 2011, 2014
- Campeonato Brasileiro Série A: 2013, 2014
- Copa do Brasil: 2017, 2018

Santos

- Campeonato Paulista: 2012
- Recopa Sudamericana: 2012

Fluminense

- Taça Rio: 2020
