= Natividade, Rio de Janeiro =

Natividade
- Municipality
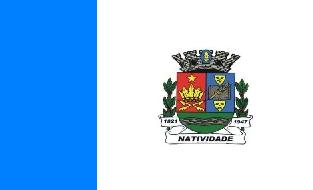
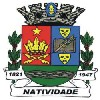
- Flag Coat of arms

- Location of Natividade within the state of Rio de Janeiro

- Location of Natividade within Brazil
- Coordinates: 20°2′31″S 41°58′22″W
- Country: Brazil
- State: Rio de Janeiro

Government
  - Prefeito: Marcos Antonio da Silva Toledo (PSDB)

Area
  - Total: 387,026 km^{2} (149,432 sq mi)
- Elevation: 182 m (597 ft)

Population (2020)
  - Total: 15,311
  - Density: 0.039561/km^{2} (0.10246/sq mi)
- Demonym: natividadense

Natividade (Portuguese pronunciation: [nɐtʃiviˈdadʒi], Nativity) is a municipality located in the Brazilian state of Rio de Janeiro. Its population was 15,311 (2020) and its area is 387 km^{2} (149 sq mi).
