= Fabrício de Souza =

Brazilian footballer (born 1982)

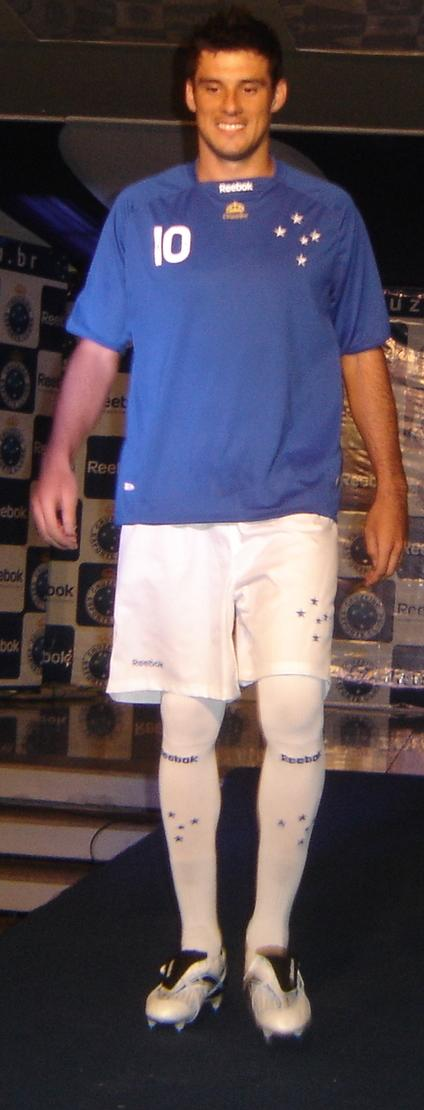

Personal information
- Full name: Fabrício de Souza
- Date of birth: 5 July 1982 (age 44)
- Place of birth: Imbituba, Brazil
- Height: 1.79 m (5 ft 10 in)
- Position: Defensive midfielder

Youth career
- 2000–2001: União São João

Senior career*
Years	Team	Apps	(Gls)
2001–2005	Corinthians	227	(20)
2006–2007	Júbilo Iwata	66	(11)
2008	→ Cruzeiro (loan)	37	(2)
2009–2011	Cruzeiro	98	(6)
2012–2014	São Paulo	28	(0)
2014	→ Vasco da Gama (loan)	25	(2)
2015	Joinville	9	(0)

International career
2003	Brazil U23	3	(0)
- * Club domestic league appearances and goals

Fabrício de Souza or simply Fabrício (born 5 July 1982) is a Brazilian former footballer who played as a defensive midfielder.

== Biography ==
In February 2006 he left for Júbilo Iwata. In January 2008, he was loaned to Cruzeiro along with Henrique. In January 2009 the deal became permanent. He signed a 3-year contract with club.

== Club statistics ==
Club performance			League		Cup		League Cup		Total	
Season	Club	League	Apps	Goals	Apps	Goals	Apps	Goals	Apps	Goals
Brazil			League		Copa do Brasil		League Cup		Total	
2001	Corinthians	Série A	8	1					8	1
2002	Corinthians	Série A	19	0					19	0
2003	Corinthians	Série A	40	3					40	3
2004	Corinthians	Série A	2	0					2	0
2005	Corinthians	Série A	16	0					16	0
Japan			League		Emperor's Cup		J.League Cup		Total	
2006	Júbilo Iwata	J1 League	31	4	3	0	7	1	41	5
2007	Júbilo Iwata	J1 League	25	2	1	0	4	0	30	2
Brazil			League		Copa do Brasil		League Cup		Total	
2008	Cruzeiro	Série A	26	2					26	2
2009	Cruzeiro	Série A	30	3					30	3
2010	Cruzeiro	Série A	27	0					27	0
2011	Cruzeiro	Série A	29	3					29	3
2012	São Paulo	Série A	0	0	0	0	0	0	0	0
Country	Brazil		111	6					111	6
Country	Japan		56	6	4	0	11	1	71	7
Total			167	12	4	0	11	1	182	13

== Honours ==
Corinthians

- Tournament Rio – São Paulo: 2002
- Brazilian Cup: 2002
- São Paulo State League: 2003
- Brazilian League: 2005

Cruzeiro

- Minas Gerais State League: 2008, 2009, 2011
