= 2010 Copa Libertadores second stage =

Football tournament group stage

The Second Stage of the 2010 Copa Santander Libertadores was a group stage. It was contested from February 9 to April 22.

== Format ==
Twenty-six teams qualified directly into this round, plus six that advanced from the First Stage. This brings the total number of teams in the Second Stage to 32. The teams were drawn into eight groups of four. The teams in each group will play each other in a double round-robin format, playing the other teams in the group once at home and once away. Teams will be awarded 3 points for a win, 1 point for a draw, and 0 points for a loss. The following criteria will be used for breaking ties on points:

1. Goal difference
2. Goals scored
3. Away goals
4. Draw

The top team from each group advances to the Round of 16, accompanied by the 6 best runners-up.

== Groups ==
=== Group 1 ===
Pos	Team	Pld	W	D	L	GF	GA	GD	Pts	COR	RCM	DIM	CER
1	(Brazil) Corinthians	6	5	1	0	9	3	+6	16	—	2–1	1–0	2–1
2	(Uruguay) Racing	6	2	2	2	4	5	−1	8	0–2	—	1–0	2–1
3	(Colombia) Independiente Medellín	6	1	3	2	3	4	−1	6	1–1	0–0	—	1–0
4	(Paraguay) Cerro Porteño	6	0	2	4	3	7	−4	2	0–1	0–0	1–1	—

Legend: Blue = home team win; Yellow = draw; Red = away team win.
February 11, 2010
20:15 UTC−03:00

Cerro Porteño (Paraguay)	1–1	(Colombia) Independiente Medellín
Ramírez 56'	Report	Pardo 17'

Estadio Defensores del Chaco, Asunción
Attendance: 15,219
Referee: Saúl Laverni (Argentina)

February 24, 2010
21:50 UTC−03:00

Corinthians (Brazil)	2–1	(Uruguay) Racing
Elias 10', 70'	Report	Cauteruccio 1'

Estádio Municipal Paulo Machado de Carvalho (Pacaembú), São Paulo
Attendance: 31,035
Referee: Raúl Orosco (Bolivia)

March 9, 2010
20:00 UTC−02:00

Racing (Uruguay)	2–1	(Paraguay) Cerro Porteño
Mirabaje 18'; Cauteruccio 68'	Report	Cáceres 83'

Estadio Centenario, Montevideo
Attendance: 1,435
Referee: Federico Beligoy (Argentina)

March 10, 2010
19:50 UTC−05:00

Independiente Medellín (Colombia)	1–1	(Brazil) Corinthians
Valoyes 75'	Report	Dentinho 84'

Estadio Nemesio Camacho "El Campín", Bogotá
Attendance: 23,886
Referee: Sergio Pezzotta (Argentina)

March 17, 2010
21:50 UTC−03:00

Cerro Porteño (Paraguay)	0–1	(Brazil) Corinthians
	Report	Ronaldo 40'

Estadio Defensores del Chaco, Asunción
Attendance: 17,321
Referee: Pablo Pozo (Chile)

March 18, 2010
21:45 UTC−05:00

Independiente Medellín (Colombia)	0–0	(Uruguay) Racing
	Report

Estadio Palogrande, Manizales
Attendance: 4,651
Referee: Juan Soto (Venezuela)

March 25, 2010
21:15 UTC−03:00

Racing (Uruguay)	1–0	(Colombia) Independiente Medellín
Ostolaza 74'	Report

Estadio Gran Parque Central, Montevideo
Attendance: 2,492
Referee: Diego Abal (Argentina)

April 1, 2010
19:15 UTC−03:00

Corinthians (Brazil)	2–1	(Paraguay) Cerro Porteño
Ronaldo 36'; Chicão 63'	Report	dos Santos 79'

Estádio Municipal Paulo Machado de Carvalho (Pacaembú), São Paulo
Attendance: 30,321
Referee: Víctor Hugo Carrillo (Peru)

April 8, 2010
18:15 UTC−05:00

Independiente Medellín (Colombia)	1–0	(Paraguay) Cerro Porteño
Arias 55'	Report

Estadio Atanasio Girardot, Medellín
Attendance: 8,066
Referee: Georges Buckley (Peru)

April 14, 2010
21:50 UTC−03:00

Racing (Uruguay)	0–2	(Brazil) Corinthians
	Report	Dentinho 33'; Elias 87'

Estadio Gran Parque Central, Montevideo
Attendance: 2,669
Referee: Héctor Baldassi (Argentina)

April 22, 2010
20:50 UTC−04:00

Cerro Porteño (Paraguay)	0–0	(Uruguay) Racing
	Report

Estadio General Pablo Rojas (La Olla), Asunción
Attendance: 2,728
Referee: Víctor Rivera (Peru)

April 22, 2010
21:50 UTC−03:00

Corinthians (Brazil)	1–0	(Colombia) Independiente Medellín
Valencia 23' (o.g.)	Report

Estádio Municipal Paulo Machado de Carvalho (Pacaembú), São Paulo
Attendance: 29,541
Referee: Federico Beligoy (Argentina)

=== Group 2 ===
Pos	Team	Pld	W	D	L	GF	GA	GD	Pts	SÃO	ONC	MTY	NPR
1	(Brazil) São Paulo	6	4	1	1	9	2	+7	13	—	1–0	2–0	3–0
2	(Colombia) Once Caldas	6	3	2	1	8	5	+3	11	2–1	—	1–1	1–0
3	(Mexico) Monterrey	6	1	3	2	5	8	−3	6	0–0	2–2	—	2–1
4	(Paraguay) Nacional	6	1	0	5	3	10	−7	3	0–2	0–2	2–0	—

Legend: Blue = home team win; Yellow = draw; Red = away team win.
February 9, 2010
19:20 UTC−03:00

Nacional (Paraguay)	0–2	(Colombia) Once Caldas
	Report	Castrillón 22'; Santoya 64'

Estadio Defensores del Chaco, Asunción
Attendance: 966
Referee: Federico Beligoy (Argentina)

February 10, 2010
21:50 UTC−02:00

São Paulo (Brazil)	2–0	(Mexico) Monterrey
Washington 12', 76'	Report

Estádio Cícero Pompeu de Toledo (Morumbi), São Paulo
Attendance: 34,501
Referee: Sergio Pezzotta (Argentina)

February 24, 2010
21:10 UTC−06:00

Monterrey (Mexico)	2–1	(Paraguay) Nacional
Santana 60'; Martínez 68'	Report	Miranda 67' (pen.)

Estadio Tecnológico, Monterrey
Attendance: 20,366
Referee: Víctor Rivera (Peru)

February 25, 2010
19:10 UTC−05:00

Once Caldas (Colombia)	2–1	(Brazil) São Paulo
Uribe 49'; Moreno 71'	Report	Rogério Ceni 32'

Estadio Palogrande, Manizales
Attendance: 21,766
Referee: Pablo Pozo (Chile)

March 10, 2010
17:30 UTC−05:00

Once Caldas (Colombia)	1–1	(Mexico) Monterrey
Valencia 58'	Report	Morales 33'

Estadio Palogrande, Manizales
Attendance: 20,127
Referee: Joaquín Antequera (Bolivia)

March 11, 2010
20:30 UTC−02:00

Nacional (Paraguay)	0–2	(Brazil) São Paulo
	Report	Washington 59', 89'

Estadio Defensores del Chaco, Asunción
Attendance: 700
Referee: Enrique Osses (Chile)

March 17, 2010
21:15 UTC−06:00

Monterrey (Mexico)	2–2	(Colombia) Once Caldas
Martínez 18' (pen.); Cardozo 46'	Report	Moreno 1'; Castrillón 66'

Estadio Tecnológico, Monterrey
Attendance: 26,725
Referee: Georges Buckley (Peru)

March 18, 2010
21:30 UTC−03:00

São Paulo (Brazil)	3–0	(Paraguay) Nacional
Dagoberto 30'; Léo Lima 33'; Washington 55'	Report

Estádio Cícero Pompeu de Toledo (Morumbi), São Paulo
Attendance: 31,411
Referee: Darío Ubriaco (Uruguay)

March 31, 2010
18:50 UTC−06:00

Monterrey (Mexico)	0–0	(Brazil) São Paulo
	Report

Estadio Tecnológico, Monterrey
Attendance: 28,472
Referee: Saúl Laverni (Argentina)

April 1, 2010
21:45 UTC−05:00

Once Caldas (Colombia)	1–0	(Paraguay) Nacional
Valencia 14'	Report

Estadio Palogrande, Manizales
Attendance: 17,086
Referee: Mayker Gómez (Venezuela)

April 21, 2010
20:50 UTC−04:00

Nacional (Paraguay)	2–0	(Mexico) Monterrey
Paniagua 4'; Beltrán 67'	Report

Estadio Defensores del Chaco, Asunción
Attendance: 341
Referee: Raúl Orosco (Bolivia)

April 21, 2010
21:50 UTC−03:00

São Paulo (Brazil)	1–0	(Colombia) Once Caldas
Fernandinho 40'	Report

Estádio Cícero Pompeu de Toledo (Morumbi), São Paulo
Attendance: 50,461
Referee: Diego Abal (Argentina)

=== Group 3 ===
Pos	Team	Pld	W	D	L	GF	GA	GD	Pts	ELP	ALI	JA	BOL
1	(Argentina) Estudiantes	6	4	1	1	11	5	+6	13	—	1–0	5–1	2–0
2	(Peru) Alianza Lima	6	4	0	2	12	7	+5	12	4–1	—	2–0	1–0
3	(Peru) Juan Aurich	6	2	0	4	7	13	−6	6	0–2	4–2	—	2–0
4	(Bolivia) Bolívar	6	1	1	4	3	8	−5	4	0–0	1–3	2–0	—

Legend: Blue = home team win; Yellow = draw; Red = away team win.
February 10, 2010
17:30 UTC−04:00

Bolívar (Bolivia)	1–3	(Peru) Alianza Lima
Ferreira 89' (pen.)	Report	Fernández 73', 74'; Montaño 90+1'

Estadio Hernando Siles, La Paz
Attendance: 16,852
Referee: Samuel Haro (Ecuador)

February 11, 2010
15:30 UTC−03:00

Estudiantes (Argentina)	5–1	(Peru) Juan Aurich
Boselli 6' (pen.), 59', 72'; Ré 43'; González 89'	Report	Tejada 34'

Estadio Centenario, Quilmes
Attendance: 10,704
Referee: Salvio Fagundes (Brazil)

February 18, 2010
19:30 UTC−05:00

Alianza Lima (Peru)	4–1	(Argentina) Estudiantes
Aguirre 18', 34', 74'; Fernández 84'	Report	Sosa 1'

Estadio Alejandro Villanueva, Lima
Attendance: 16,310
Referee: Marlon Escalante (Venezuela)

February 24, 2010
17:30 UTC−05:00

Juan Aurich (Peru)	2–0	(Bolivia) Bolívar
Ciciliano 11'; Tejada 37'	Report

Estadio Elías Aguirre, Chiclayo
Attendance: 10,759
Referee: Patricio Polic (Chile)

March 9, 2010
18:00 UTC−04:00

Bolívar (Bolivia)	0–0	(Argentina) Estudiantes
	Report

Estadio Hernando Siles, La Paz
Attendance: 7,887
Referee: Carlos Galeano (Paraguay)

March 10, 2010
19:50 UTC−05:00

Alianza Lima (Peru)	2–0	(Peru) Juan Aurich
Fernández 41'; Tragodara 59'	Report

Estadio Alejandro Villanueva, Lima
Attendance: 24,742
Referee: Percy Rojas (Peru)

March 16, 2010
20:00 UTC−05:00

Juan Aurich (Peru)	4–2	(Peru) Alianza Lima
Guizasola 25'; Tejada 44'; Manco 59'; Ascoy 87'	Report	Sánchez 3'; Ovelar 72'

Estadio Elías Aguirre, Chiclayo
Attendance: 13,253
Referee: Carlos Simon (Brazil)

March 23, 2010
19:30 UTC−03:00

Estudiantes (Argentina)	2–0	(Bolivia) Bolívar
Sosa 51'; Boselli 79'	Report

Estadio José Luis Meiszner, Quilmes
Attendance: 8,907
Referee: Marcelo de Lima Henrique (Brazil)

March 30, 2010
20:30 UTC−05:00

Juan Aurich (Peru)	0–2	(Argentina) Estudiantes
	Report	Fernández 52'; Braña 68'

Estadio Elías Aguirre, Chiclayo
Attendance: 19,904
Referee: Carlos Amarilla (Paraguay)

April 8, 2010
20:30 UTC−05:00

Alianza Lima (Peru)	1–0	(Bolivia) Bolívar
Fernández 6'	Report

Estadio Alejandro Villanueva, Lima
Attendance: 11,285
Referee: Juan Soto (Venezuela)

April 20, 2010
20:15 UTC−04:00

Bolívar (Bolivia)	2–0	(Peru) Juan Aurich
Flores 71' da Rosa 86'	Report

Estadio Hernando Siles, La Paz
Attendance: 2,484
Referee: Jorge Osorio (Chile)

April 20, 2010
21:15 UTC−03:00

Estudiantes (Argentina)	1–0	(Peru) Alianza Lima
Verón 90+5'	Report

Estadio José Luis Meiszner, Quilmes
Attendance: 14,982
Referee: Roberto Silvera (Uruguay)

=== Group 4 ===
Pos	Team	Pld	W	D	L	GF	GA	GD	Pts	LIB	UNI	LAN	BLO
1	(Paraguay) Libertad	6	3	3	0	10	3	+7	12	—	1–1	1–1	4–0
2	(Peru) Universitario	6	2	4	0	5	2	+3	10	0–0	—	2–0	0–0
3	(Argentina) Lanús	6	2	2	2	6	6	0	8	0–2	0–0	—	1–0
4	(Bolivia) Blooming	6	0	1	5	3	13	−10	1	1–2	1–2	1–4	—

Legend: Blue = home team win; Yellow = draw; Red = away team win.
February 9, 2010
21:40 UTC−03:00

Lanús (Argentina)	0–2	(Paraguay) Libertad
	Report	Rod. Gamarra 67'; Velázquez 73'

Estadio Ciudad de Lanús – Néstor Díaz Pérez, Lanús
Attendance: 4,220
Referee: Wilson Seneme (Brazil)

February 11, 2010
21:30 UTC−04:00

Blooming (Bolivia)	1–2	(Peru) Universitario
Gómez 89'	Report	Orejuela 52'; Espinoza 76'

Estadio Ramón "Tahuichi" Aguilera, Santa Cruz
Attendance: 10,600
Referee: Julio Quintana (Paraguay)

February 16, 2010
21:25 UTC−03:00

Libertad (Paraguay)	4–0	(Bolivia) Blooming
Cáceres 45'; Rod. Gamarra 68', 90+1'; Ayala 90'	Report

Estadio Defensores del Chaco, Asunción
Attendance: 457
Referee: Roberto Silvera (Uruguay)

February 17, 2010
21:30 UTC−05:00

Universitario (Peru)	2–0	(Argentina) Lanús
Alva 18'; Labarthe 88'	Report

Estadio Monumental, Lima
Attendance: 12,507
Referee: Juan Soto (Venezuela)

February 25, 2010
18:00 UTC−04:00

Blooming (Bolivia)	1–4	(Argentina) Lanús
Vieira 9'	Report	Blanco 24'; Salcedo 39'; Lagos 60', 76'

Estadio Ramón "Tahuichi" Aguilera, Santa Cruz
Attendance: 3,709
Referee: Evandro Roman (Brazil)

February 25, 2010
21:20 UTC−05:00

Universitario (Peru)	0–0	(Paraguay) Libertad
	Report

Estadio Monumental, Lima
Attendance: 16,530
Referee: Omar Ponce (Ecuador)

March 23, 2010
21:45 UTC−03:00

Libertad (Paraguay)	1–1	(Peru) Universitario
Ayala 56'	Report	Ramírez 87'

Estadio Defensores del Chaco, Asunción
Attendance: 270
Referee: Salvio Fagundes (Brazil)

March 24, 2010
21:50 UTC−03:00

Lanús (Argentina)	1–0	(Bolivia) Blooming
Salcedo 17' (pen.)	Report

Estadio Ciudad de Lanús – Néstor Díaz Pérez, Lanús
Attendance: 4,271
Referee: Patricio Polic (Chile)

March 30, 2010
20:15 UTC−03:00

Libertad (Paraguay)	1–1	(Argentina) Lanús
Román 4'	Report	Velázquez 84'

Estadio Defensores del Chaco, Asunción
Attendance: 902
Referee: Paulo de Oliveira (Brazil)

April 6, 2010
20:30 UTC−05:00

Universitario (Peru)	0–0	(Bolivia) Blooming
	Report

Estadio Monumental, Lima
Attendance: 18,884
Referee: Heber Lopes (Brazil)

April 15, 2010
18:30 UTC−04:00

Blooming (Bolivia)	1–2	(Paraguay) Libertad
Hurtado 27'	Report	Román 38'; Rod. Gamarra 53'

Estadio Ramón "Tahuichi" Aguilera, Santa Cruz
Attendance: 804
Referee: Jorge Larrionda (Uruguay)

April 15, 2010
19:30 UTC−03:00

Lanús (Argentina)	0–0	(Peru) Universitario
	Report

Estadio Ciudad de Lanús – Néstor Díaz Pérez, Lanús
Attendance: 4,198
Referee: Carlos Simon (Brazil)

=== Group 5 ===
Pos	Team	Pld	W	D	L	GF	GA	GD	Pts	INT	QUI	CRR	EME
1	(Brazil) Internacional	6	3	3	0	8	2	+6	12	—	3–0	2–0	2–1
2	(Ecuador) Deportivo Quito	6	3	1	2	5	7	−2	10	1–1	—	2–1	1–0
3	(Uruguay) Cerro	6	2	2	2	5	5	0	8	0–0	2–0	—	0–0
4	(Ecuador) Emelec	6	0	2	4	2	6	−4	2	0–0	0–1	1–2	—

Legend: Blue = home team win; Yellow = draw; Red = away team win.
February 9, 2010
18:00 UTC−02:00

Cerro (Uruguay)	2–0	(Ecuador) Deportivo Quito
Dadomo 19'; Mora 62'	Report

Estadio Centenario, Montevideo
Attendance: 6,021
Referee: Jorge Luis Osorio (Chile)

February 23, 2010
21:50 UTC−03:00

Internacional (Brazil)	2–1	(Ecuador) Emelec
Nei 53'; Alecsandro 87'	Report	Quiroz 49'

Estádio José Pinheiro Borda (Beira-Rio), Porto Alegre
Attendance: 39,304
Referee: Diego Abal (Argentina)

March 11, 2010
19:15 UTC−05:00

Emelec (Ecuador)	1–2	(Uruguay) Cerro
Pérez 70'	Report	Caballero 52'; Dadomo 57'

Estadio George Capwell, Guayaquil
Attendance: 9,793
Referee: Víctor Hugo Carrillo (Peru)

March 11, 2010
21:30 UTC−05:00

Deportivo Quito (Ecuador)	1–1	(Brazil) Internacional
Minda 33'	Report	Giuliano 40'

Estadio Olímpico Atahualpa, Quito
Attendance: 4,088
Referee: José Buitrago (Colombia)

March 18, 2010
19:15 UTC−03:00

Cerro (Uruguay)	0–0	(Brazil) Internacional
	Report

Estadio Atilio Paiva Olivera, Rivera
Attendance: 25,510
Referee: Saúl Laverni (Argentina)

March 25, 2010
19:15 UTC−05:00

Deportivo Quito (Ecuador)	1–0	(Ecuador) Emelec
Arroyo 64'	Report

Estadio Olímpico Atahualpa, Quito
Attendance: 5,719
Referee: José Luis Espinel (Ecuador)

March 31, 2010
21:50 UTC−03:00

Internacional (Brazil)	2–0	(Uruguay) Cerro
Ibáñez 59' (o.g.); Alecsandro 72'	Report

Estádio José Pinheiro Borda (Beira-Rio), Porto Alegre
Attendance: 36,897
Referee: Carlos Torres (Paraguay)

April 1, 2010
18:30 UTC−05:00

Emelec (Ecuador)	0–1	(Ecuador) Deportivo Quito
	Report	Hurtado 90+1' (pen.)

Estadio George Capwell, Guayaquil
Attendance: 4,217
Referee: Samuel Haro (Ecuador)

April 13, 2010
18:15 UTC−05:00

Deportivo Quito (Ecuador)	2–1	(Uruguay) Cerro
Mina 20'; Checa 87'	Report	Dadomo 26' (pen.)

Estadio Olímpico Atahualpa, Quito
Attendance: 6,836
Referee: Óscar Ruiz (Colombia)

April 14, 2010
17:30 UTC−05:00

Emelec (Ecuador)	0–0	(Brazil) Internacional
	Report

Estadio George Capwell, Guayaquil
Attendance: 3,774
Referee: Marlon Escalante (Venezuela)

April 22, 2010
19:30 UTC−03:00

Internacional (Brazil)	3–0	(Ecuador) Deportivo Quito
Andrezinho 4'; Bolívar 61'; Giuliano 90+2'	Report

Estádio José Pinheiro Borda (Beira-Rio), Porto Alegre
Attendance: 31,360
Referee: Carlos Amarilla (Paraguay)

April 22, 2010
19:30 UTC−03:00

Cerro (Uruguay)	0–0	(Ecuador) Emelec
	Report

Estadio Luis Tróccoli, Montevideo
Attendance: 2,669
Referee: Iván Gamboa (Bolivia)

=== Group 6 ===
Pos	Team	Pld	W	D	L	GF	GA	GD	Pts	NAC	BAN	MOR	CUE
1	(Uruguay) Nacional	6	3	3	0	9	4	+5	12	—	2–2	2–0	3–2
2	(Argentina) Banfield	6	3	2	1	13	8	+5	11	0–2	—	2–1	4–1
3	(Mexico) Morelia	6	1	2	3	4	8	−4	5	0–0	1–1	—	2–1
4	(Ecuador) Deportivo Cuenca	6	1	1	4	7	13	−6	4	0–0	1–4	2–0	—

Legend: Blue = home team win; Yellow = draw; Red = away team win.
February 10, 2010
18:30 UTC−03:00

Banfield (Argentina)	2–1	(Mexico) Morelia
Rodríguez 55'; Battión 79'	Report	Rey 90'

Estadio Florencio Sola, Banfield
Attendance: 5,804
Referee: Javier Arias (Paraguay)

February 11, 2010
19:00 UTC−02:00

Nacional (Uruguay)	3–2	(Ecuador) Deportivo Cuenca
Regueiro 46', 65'; Morales 85' (pen.)	Report	Granda 25'; Escalada 67'

Estadio Gran Parque Central, Montevideo
Attendance: 11,299
Referee: Enrique Osses (Chile)

February 17, 2010
19:15 UTC−05:00

Deportivo Cuenca (Ecuador)	1–4	(Argentina) Banfield
Méndez 86' (pen.)	Report	Erviti 35'; Fernández 38', 60'; Rodríguez 71'

Estadio Alejandro Serrano Aguilar, Cuenca
Attendance: 11,345
Referee: Wilmar Roldán (Colombia)

February 23, 2010
21:10 UTC−06:00

Morelia (Mexico)	0–0	(Uruguay) Nacional
	Report

Estadio Morelos, Morelia
Attendance: 21,493
Referee: Francisco Peñuela (Colombia)

March 9, 2010
21:30 UTC−05:00

Deportivo Cuenca (Ecuador)	2–0	(Mexico) Morelia
Méndez 59'; Escalada 83'	Report

Estadio Alejandro Serrano Aguilar, Cuenca
Attendance: 7,700
Referee: Giovanni Perluzzo (Venezuela)

March 10, 2010
20:30 UTC−02:00

Nacional (Uruguay)	2–2	(Argentina) Banfield
Varela 6'; Regueiro 41'	Report	Rodríguez 18', 37' (pen.)

Estadio Centenario, Montevideo
Attendance: 34,468
Referee: Heber Lopes (Brazil)

March 16, 2010
19:30 UTC−03:00

Banfield (Argentina)	0–2	(Uruguay) Nacional
	Report	Coates 34'; Godoy 41'

Estadio Florencio Sola, Banfield
Attendance: 9,507
Referee: Wilson Seneme (Brazil)

March 16, 2010
21:15 UTC−06:00

Morelia (Mexico)	2–1	(Ecuador) Deportivo Cuenca
Borgetti 19', 27'	Report	Ladines 76'

Estadio Morelos, Morelia
Attendance: 14,066
Referee: Víctor Rivera (Peru)

March 31, 2010
21:10 UTC−06:00

Morelia (Mexico)	1–1	(Argentina) Banfield
Borgetti 78'	Report	Laso 90+2'

Estadio Morelos, Morelia
Attendance: 16,516
Referee: Óscar Ruiz (Colombia)

April 7, 2010
17:30 UTC−05:00

Deportivo Cuenca (Ecuador)	0–0	(Uruguay) Nacional
	Report

Estadio Alejandro Serrano Aguilar, Cuenca
Attendance: 4,683
Referee: Pablo Pozo (Chile)

April 21, 2010
19:30 UTC−03:00

Nacional (Uruguay)	2–0	(Mexico) Morelia
Regueiro 3'; Pereyra 78'	Report

Estadio Gran Parque Central, Montevideo
Attendance: 12,780
Referee: Paulo César de Oliveira (Brazil)

April 21, 2010
19:30 UTC−03:00

Banfield (Argentina)	4–1	(Ecuador) Deportivo Cuenca
Ramírez 48', 68'; Erviti 87'; Lucchetti 90' (pen.)	Report	Méndez 72'

Estadio Florencio Sola, Banfield
Attendance: 5,486
Referee: Carlos Galeano (Paraguay)

=== Group 7 ===
Pos	Team	Pld	W	D	L	GF	GA	GD	Pts	VÉL	CRU	CC	ITA
1	(Argentina) Vélez Sársfield	6	4	1	1	10	5	+5	13	—	2–0	2–1	4–0
2	(Brazil) Cruzeiro	6	3	2	1	12	6	+6	11	3–0	—	4–1	2–0
3	(Chile) Colo-Colo	6	2	2	2	8	10	−2	8	1–1	1–1	—	1–0
4	(Venezuela) Deportivo Italia	6	0	1	5	4	13	−9	1	0–1	2–2	2–3	—

Legend: Blue = home team win; Yellow = draw; Red = away team win.
February 10, 2010
20:50 UTC−03:00

Vélez Sársfield (Argentina)	2–0	(Brazil) Cruzeiro
Silva 5'; Martínez 77'	Report

Estadio José Amalfitani, Buenos Aires
Attendance: 11,100
Referee: Martín Vázquez (Uruguay)

February 16, 2010
19:00 UTC−03:00

Colo-Colo (Chile)	1–0	(Venezuela) Deportivo Italia
Paredes 58'	Report

Estadio Monumental, Santiago
Attendance: 10,840
Referee: Víctor Hugo Carrillo (Peru)

February 23, 2010
18:00 UTC−04:30

Deportivo Italia (Venezuela)	0–1	(Argentina) Vélez Sársfield
	Report	López 54'

Estadio Olímpico UCV, Caracas
Attendance: 1,351
Referee: Samuel Haro (Ecuador)

February 24, 2010
19:30 UTC−02:00

Cruzeiro (Brazil)	4–1	(Chile) Colo-Colo
Thiago Ribeiro 7'; Kléber 62' (pen.), 72' (pen.); Pedro Ken 69'	Report	Paredes 37'

Estádio Governador Magalhães Pinto (Mineirão), Belo Horizonte
Attendance: 32,927
Referee: Óscar Ruiz (Colombia)

March 11, 2010
19:45 UTC−04:30

Deportivo Italia (Venezuela)	2–2	(Brazil) Cruzeiro
Blanco 11'; McIntosh 65'	Report	Kléber 26', 50'

Estadio Olímpico UCV, Caracas
Attendance: 212
Referee: Carlos Vera (Ecuador)

March 16, 2010
22:00 UTC−03:00

Colo-Colo (Chile)	1–1	(Argentina) Vélez Sársfield
Paredes 57'	Report	Silva 90+2'

Estadio Monumental, Santiago
Attendance: 11,204
Referee: Carlos Amarilla (Paraguay)

March 24, 2010
21:50 UTC−03:00

Cruzeiro (Brazil)	2–0	(Venezuela) Deportivo Italia
Fabinho 6'; Pedro Ken 69'	Report

Estádio Governador Magalhães Pinto, Belo Horizonte
Attendance: 17,237
Referee: Antonio Arias (Paraguay)

March 25, 2010
19:00 UTC−03:00

Vélez Sársfield (Argentina)	2–1	(Chile) Colo-Colo
López 14'; Silva 30'	Report	Miralles 9'

Estadio José Amalfitani, Buenos Aires
Attendance: 9,325
Referee: Roberto Silvera (Uruguay)

March 31, 2010
19:30 UTC−03:00

Cruzeiro (Brazil)	3–0	(Argentina) Vélez Sársfield
Thiago Ribeiro 32'; Kléber 48', 53'	Report

Estádio Governador Magalhães Pinto, Belo Horizonte
Attendance: 43,374
Referee: Wilmar Roldán (Colombia)

April 6, 2010
18:45 UTC−04:30

Deportivo Italia (Venezuela)	2–3	(Chile) Colo-Colo
Panigutti 16'; Blanco 87' (pen.)	Report	Bogado 27'; Miralles 39', 58'

Estadio Olímpico UCV, Caracas
Attendance: 207
Referee: Marco Rodríguez (Mexico)

April 15, 2010
20:50 UTC−04:00

Colo-Colo (Chile)	1–1	(Brazil) Cruzeiro
Millar 61'	Report	Thiago Ribeiro 57'

Estadio Monumental, Santiago
Attendance: 8,402
Referee: Carlos Torres (Paraguay)

April 15, 2010
21:50 UTC−03:00

Vélez Sársfield (Argentina)	4–0	(Venezuela) Deportivo Italia
Zapata 42'; López 48' (pen.), 83'; Papa 73'	Report

Estadio José Amalfitani, Buenos Aires
Attendance: 5,408
Referee: Darío Ubriaco (Uruguay)

=== Group 8 ===
Pos	Team	Pld	W	D	L	GF	GA	GD	Pts	UCH	FLA	UC	CAR
1	Universidad de Chile	6	3	3	0	10	6	+4	12	—	2–1	0–0	1–0
2	(Brazil) Flamengo	6	3	1	2	11	9	+2	10	2–2	—	2–0	3–2
3	(Chile) Universidad Católica	6	1	4	1	5	5	0	7	2–2	2–0	—	1–1
4	(Venezuela) Caracas	6	0	2	4	5	11	−6	2	1–3	1–3	0–0	—

Legend: Blue = home team win; Yellow = draw; Red = away team win.
February 18, 2010
19:15 UTC−03:00

Universidad de Chile	1–0	(Venezuela) Caracas
Olivera 2' (pen.)	Report

Estadio Sausalito, Viña del Mar
Attendance: 10,091
Referee: Georges Buckley (Peru)

February 24, 2010
21:50 UTC−03:00

Flamengo (Brazil)	2–0	(Chile) Universidad Católica
Léo Moura 11'; Adriano 58'	Report

Estádio Mário Filho (Maracanã), Rio de Janeiro
Attendance: 30,930
Referee: Carlos Amarilla (Paraguay)

March 9, 2010
21:15 UTC−03:00

Universidad Católica (Chile)	2–2	Universidad de Chile
Rubio 21'; Silva 70'	Report	Olivera 19'; Puch 90+1'

Estadio Francisco Sánchez Rumoroso, Coquimbo
Attendance: 11,667
Referee: Claudio Puga (Chile)

March 10, 2010
20:20 UTC−04:30

Caracas (Venezuela)	1–3	(Brazil) Flamengo
Castellín 65'	Report	Vágner Love 36' (pen.), 75'; Rodrigo Alvim 90+2'

Estadio Olímpico UCV, Caracas
Attendance: 19,400
Referee: Wilmar Roldán (Colombia)

March 17, 2010
18:00 UTC−04:30

Caracas (Venezuela)	0–0	(Chile) Universidad Católica
	Report

Estadio Olímpico UCV, Caracas
Attendance: 15,500
Referee: Mauricio Morales (Mexico)

March 17, 2010
21:50 UTC−03:00

Universidad de Chile	2–1	(Brazil) Flamengo
Vargas 42'; Seymour 54'	Report	Rodrigo Alvim 50'

Estadio Monumental, Santiago
Attendance: 20,936
Referee: Jorge Larrionda (Uruguay)

March 24, 2010
19:30 UTC−03:00

Universidad Católica (Chile)	1–1	(Venezuela) Caracas
Morales 82'	Report	Bustamante 50'

Estadio San Carlos de Apoquindo, Santiago
Attendance: 9,103
Referee: Néstor Pitana (Argentina)

April 8, 2010
16:00 UTC−03:00

Flamengo (Brazil)	2–2	Universidad de Chile
Michael 67'; Léo Moura 82'	Report	Montillo 43'; Rodríguez 90+2'

Estádio Mário Filho (Maracanã), Rio de Janeiro
Attendance: 20,330
Referee: Roberto Silvera (Uruguay)

April 13, 2010
21:00 UTC−04:30

Caracas (Venezuela)	1–3	Universidad de Chile
Gonzalez 76'	Report	Victorino 18'; Olivera 32' (pen.); Rodríguez 35'

Estadio Olímpico UCV, Caracas
Attendance: 6,353
Referee: Joaquín Antequera (Bolivia)

April 14, 2010
20:50 UTC−04:00

Universidad Católica (Chile)	2–0	(Brazil) Flamengo
Díaz 2'; Silva 45'	Report

Estadio San Carlos de Apoquindo, Santiago
Attendance: 7,709
Referee: Sergio Pezzotta (Argentina)

April 21, 2010
20:50 UTC−04:00

Universidad de Chile	0–0	(Chile) Universidad Católica
	Report

Estadio Monumental, Santiago
Attendance: 9,286
Referee: Pablo Pozo (Chile)

April 21, 2010
21:50 UTC−03:00

Flamengo (Brazil)	3–2	(Venezuela) Caracas
Ronaldo Angelim 17'; Michael 19'; David 75'	Report	Castellín 14'; Gómez 67'

Estádio Mário Filho (Maracanã), Rio de Janeiro
Attendance: 34,106
Referee: Jorge Larrionda (Uruguay)
