= 2000 Liga de Fútbol Profesional Boliviano =

The 2000 season of the Liga de Fútbol Profesional Boliviano was the 43rd season of top-tier football in Bolivia.

== Torneo Apertura ==
Pos	Team	Pld	W	D	L	GF	GA	GD	Pts
1	Jorge Wilstermann	22	14	2	6	36	20	+16	44
2	Guabirá	22	12	2	8	39	35	+4	38
3	Bolívar	22	12	1	9	48	37	+11	37
4	The Strongest	22	10	4	8	49	28	+21	34
5	Real Potosí	22	11	1	10	31	40	−9	34
6	Independiente Petrolero	22	10	3	9	35	29	+6	33
7	Oriente Petrolero	22	8	9	5	34	29	+5	33
8	Mariscal Braun	22	10	2	10	38	37	+1	32
9	Blooming	22	8	4	10	33	42	−9	28
10	Pompeya	22	6	4	12	24	49	−25	22
11	Real Santa Cruz	22	5	5	12	31	43	−12	20
12	Unión Central	22	4	7	11	19	28	−9	19

== Torneo Clausura ==
Pos	Team	Pld	W	D	L	GF	GA	GD	Pts
1	Oriente Petrolero	22	14	3	5	42	24	+18	45
2	The Strongest	22	14	1	7	45	30	+15	43
3	Blooming	22	12	1	9	32	27	+5	37
4	Unión Central	22	11	3	8	31	33	−2	36
5	Guabirá	22	10	5	7	46	31	+15	35
6	Jorge Wilstermann	22	10	3	9	38	36	+2	33
7	Real Potosí	22	10	2	10	37	29	+8	32
8	Bolívar	22	8	4	10	35	31	+4	28
9	Mariscal Braun	22	8	4	10	31	34	−3	28
10	Real Santa Cruz	22	7	3	12	30	49	−19	24
11	Independiente Petrolero	22	6	3	13	32	48	−16	21
12	Pompeya	22	5	2	15	19	46	−27	17

== Aggregate table ==
Pos	Team	Pld	W	D	L	GF	GA	GD	Pts
1	Oriente Petrolero	44	22	12	10	76	53	+23	78
2	The Strongest	44	24	5	15	94	58	+36	77
3	Jorge Wilstermann	44	24	5	15	74	56	+18	77
4	Guabirá	44	22	7	15	85	66	+19	73
5	Real Potosí	44	21	3	20	68	69	−1	66
6	Bolívar	44	20	5	19	83	68	+15	65
7	Blooming	44	20	5	19	65	69	−4	65
8	Mariscal Braun	44	18	6	20	69	71	−2	60
9	Unión Central	44	15	10	19	50	61	−11	55
10	Independiente Petrolero	44	16	6	22	67	77	−10	54
11	Real Santa Cruz	44	12	8	24	61	92	−31	44
12	Pompeya	44	11	6	27	43	95	−52	39

== Play-offs ==
=== Promotion/relegation ===
First Leg
19 December 2000

Aurora	1 – 0	Real Santa Cruz
M. Paez

Estadio Félix Capriles, Cochabamba
First Leg
23 December 2000

Real Santa Cruz	1 – 0	Aurora
Chiorazzo,, Méndez

Estadio Juan Carlos Durán Saucedo, Santa Cruz
Real Santa Cruz remain at 1st level; Iberoamericano (farm team of Bolívar) won promotion

=== Copa Libertadores ===
First Leg
17 December 2000

The Strongest	3 – 2	Guabirá
Alvarez 18'; Delfino 28', 89'		Ayala 9'; Paz 62'

Estadio Rafael Mendoza, La Paz
Second Leg
21 December 2000

Guabirá	1 – 1	The Strongest
Ceballos 29'		Delfino 74'

Estadio Gilberto Parada, Montero
The Strongest won on points total and qualified for the Copa Libertadores 2001

=== Championship ===
First Leg
20 December 2000

Jorge Wilstermann	4 – 1	Oriente Petrolero
Soria 38'; Olivares 42'; Galindo 51'; Cárdenas 58'		Merlo 31'

Estadio Félix Capriles, Cochabamba
Second Leg
23 December 2000

Oriente Petrolero	4 – 0	Jorge Wilstermann
Merlo 45'; Coimbra 53' (pen.); Vaca 63', 76'

Estadio Tahuichi Aguilera, Santa Cruz
Third Leg
27 December 2000

Oriente Petrolero	2 – 2	Jorge Wilstermann
Coimbra 22', 90' (pen.)		Cárdenas 47'; Galindo 84'

Estadio Gran Mamoré, Trinidad
Jorge Wilstermann won 3-4 on penalties, with keeper Mauricio Soria saving four penalty kicks, and qualified for the Copa Libertadores 2001

== Title ==
Liga de Fútbol Profesional Boliviano
2000 champion
Jorge Wilstermann
3rd title

== Top scorers ==
Pos	Name	Team	Goals
1	Daniel Delfino	The Strongest	28
2	Marcelo Ceballos	Guabirá	26
	Alfredo Cristino Jara	Real Potosí	26
4	Horacio Chiorazzo	Real Santa Cruz	25
5	Vidal González	The Strongest	23
6	Joaquín Botero	Bolívar	21
	Fábio Oliveira	Mariscal Braun	21
8	Gonzalo Galindo	Jorge Wilstermann	20
9	Milton Coimbra	Oriente Petrolero	19
10	Carlos Cárdenas	Jorge Wilstermann	18
	Cristian Reynaldo	Real Potosí	18

== See also ==
- Bolivia national football team 2000
