= 2009–10 in Argentine football =

Football in Argentina
- Season: 2009–10

The 2009–10 season of Argentine football was the 119th season of competitive football in Argentina.

== National leagues ==
=== Men's ===
==== Primera División ====
- Apertura champion: Banfield (1st title).
  - Top scorer: Santiago Silva (14 goals).
- Clausura champion: Argentinos Juniors (3rd title).
  - Top scorer: Mauro Boselli (13 goals).
- International qualifiers:
  - 2010 Copa Libertadores: Banfield, Colón, Lanús, Newell's Old Boys.
  - 2011 Copa Libertadores: Argentinos Juniors.
  - 2010 Copa Sudamericana: Banfield, Argentinos Juniors, Estudiantes de La Plata, Newell's Old Boys, Independiente, Vélez Sársfield.
- Relegated: Chacarita Juniors, Atlético Tucumán, Rosario Central.

Source: RSSSF

==== Primera B Nacional ====
- Champion: Olimpo (4th title).
  - Top scorer: Leandro Armani (19 goals).
- Promoted: Olimpo, Quilmes, All Boys.
- Relegated: Sportivo Italiano, Platense.

Source: RSSSF

==== Primera B Metropolitana ====
- Champion: Almirante Brown (2nd title).
  - Top scorer: Luciano Lo Bianco (19 goals).
- Promoted: Almirante Brown.
- Relegated: Central Córdoba.

Source: RSSSF

==== Torneo Argentino A ====
- Champion: Patronato (1st title).
  - Top scorer: Diego Jara (26 goals).
- Promoted: Patronato.
- Relegated: Ben Hur, Atlético Juventud.

Source: RSSSF

==== Primera C Metropolitana ====
- Champion: Barracas Central (2nd title).
  - Top scorer: Carlos Salom (18 goals).
- Promoted: Barracas Central.
- Relegated: Argentino de Rosario.

Source: RSSSF

==== Torneo Argentino B ====
- Promoted: Douglas Haig, Central Norte.
- Relegated: Argentino de Mendoza, La Florida, Luján de Cuyo, Defensores de Salto, Real Arroyo Seco.

Source: RSSSF

==== Primera D Metropolitana ====
- Champion: UAI Urquiza (1st title).
  - Top scorer: Mariano Panno (24 goals).
- Promoted: UAI Urquiza, Liniers.
- Relegated: Muñiz.

Source: RSSSF

==== Torneo Argentino C ====
- Promoted: Complejo Teniente Origone, Sarmiento (LB), Argentino (VdM), Atlético Paraná, Altos Hornos Zapla.

Source: RSSSF

=== Women's ===
==== Campeonato de Fútbol Femenino ====
- Apertura champion: Boca Juniors (17th title).
- Clausura champion: River Plate (10th title).
- International qualifier:
  - 2010 Copa Libertadores de Fútbol Femenino: Boca Juniors.

Source: RSSSF

== Clubs in international competitions ==
=== Men's ===
Team / Competition	2009 Copa Sudamericana	2009 FIFA Club World Cup	2010 Copa Libertadores
Banfield	did not qualify	did not qualify	Round of 16 eliminated by (Brazil) Internacional
Boca Juniors	First Stage eliminated by (Argentina) Vélez Sarsfield	did not qualify	did not qualify
Colón	did not qualify	did not qualify	First stage eliminated by (Chile) Universidad Católica
Estudiantes de La Plata	did not qualify	Runner up lost to (Spain) Barcelona	Quarterfinals eliminated by (Brazil) Internacional
Lanús	Round of 16 eliminated by (Ecuador) LDU Quito	did not qualify	Second stage eliminated (finished 3rd in the group)
Newell's Old Boys	did not qualify	did not qualify	First stage eliminated by (Ecuador) Emelec
River Plate	First Stage eliminated by (Argentina) Lanús	did not qualify	did not qualify
San Lorenzo	Quarterfinals eliminated by (Uruguay) River Plate	did not qualify	did not qualify
Tigre	First Stage eliminated by (Argentina) San Lorenzo	did not qualify	did not qualify
Velez Sarsfield	Quarterfinals eliminated by (Ecuador) LDU Quito	did not qualify	Round of 16 eliminated by (Mexico) Guadalajara

=== Women's ===
Team / Competition	2009 Copa Libertadores de Fútbol Femenino
San Lorenzo	First stage eliminated (finished 4th in the group)

== National teams ==
Win Draw Loss

=== Men's ===
This section covers Argentina men's matches from August 1, 2009, to July 31, 2010.

==== Friendly matches ====
August 12, 2009	Russia	2 – 3	Argentina	Moscow, Russia
	Semshov 17'; Pavlyuchenko 78'	(Report)	Agüero 45'; López 46'; Dátolo 59'	Stadium: Lokomotiv Stadium; Referee: Frank De Bleeckere (Belgium)

September 30, 2009	Argentina	2 – 0	Ghana	Córdoba, Argentina
21:00 UTC-3	Palermo 28', 39'	(Report)		Stadium: Estadio Olímpico Chateau Carreras; Referee: Enrique Osses (Chile)

November 14, 2009	Spain	2 – 1	Argentina	Madrid, Spain
20:45 UTC+1	Alonso 15', 85' (pen.)	(Report)	Messi 60' (pen.)	Stadium: Vicente Calderón Stadium; Attendance: 54,000; Referee: Alan Kelly (Ireland)

December 22, 2009 Unofficial friendly	Catalonia	4 – 2	Argentina	Barcelona, Spain
21:30 UTC+1	S. García 44'; Bojan 55'; Sergio 70'; Hurtado 75'	(Report)	Pastore 63'; Di María 71'	Stadium: Camp Nou; Referee: Alfonso Alvarez Izquierdo (Catalonia)

January 26, 2010	Argentina	3 – 2	Costa Rica	San Juan, Argentina
19:00 UTC−3	Sosa 10'; Burdisso 37'; Jara 78'	(Report)	Barrantes 20'; Madrigal 76'	Stadium: Estadio Ingeniero Hilario Sánchez; Referee: Carlos Amarilla (Paraguay)

February 10, 2010	Argentina	2 – 1	Jamaica	Mar del Plata, Argentina
22:00 UTC−3	Palermo 77'; Canuto 90+3'	(Report)	Johnson 46'	Stadium: Estadio José María Minella; Referee: Víctor Hugo Rivera Chávez (Peru)

March 3, 2010	Germany	0 – 1	Argentina	Munich, Germany
		(Report)	Higuaín 44'	Stadium: Allianz Arena; Attendance: 65,152; Referee: Martin Atkinson (England)

May 5, 2010	Argentina	4 – 0	Haiti	Cutral Có, Argentina
21:00 UTC−3	Bertoglio 33', 56'; Palermo 42'; Blanco 50'	(Report)		Stadium: El Coloso del Ruca Quimey; Referee: Enrique Osses (Chile)

May 24, 2010	Argentina	5 – 0	Canada	Buenos Aires, Argentina
16:45 UTC−3	Rodríguez 15', 32'; Di María 36'; Tevez 62'; Agüero 70'	(Report)		Stadium: Estadio Antonio V. Liberti; Attendance: 52,000; Referee: Víctor Hugo Rivera Chávez (Peru)

==== 2010 World Cup qualifiers ====
September 5, 2009 Round 15	Argentina	1 – 3	Brazil	Rosario, Argentina
21:30 UTC-3	Dátolo 65'	(Report)	Luisão 23'; Luís Fabiano 30', 68'	Stadium: Estadio Gigante de Arroyito; Attendance: 37,000; Referee: Óscar Ruiz (Colombia)

September 9, 2009 Round 16	Paraguay	1 – 0	Argentina	Asunción, Paraguay
19:00 UTC-4	Valdez 27'	(Report)		Stadium: Estadio Defensores del Chaco; Attendance: 38,000; Referee: Salvio Fagundes (Brazil)

October 10, 2009 Round 17	Argentina	2 – 1	Peru	Buenos Aires, Argentina
18:30 UTC-3	Higuaín 48'; Palermo 90+2'	(Report)	Rengifo 89'	Stadium: Estadio Antonio V. Liberti; Attendance: 38,019; Referee: René Ortubé (Bolivia)

October 14, 2009 Round 18	Uruguay	0 – 1	Argentina	Montevideo, Uruguay
20:00 UTC-2		(Report)	Bolatti 84'	Stadium: Estadio Centenario; Attendance: 60,000; Referee: Carlos Amarilla (Paraguay)

==== 2010 World Cup ====
June 12, 2010 Group stage	Argentina	1 – 0	Nigeria	Johannesburg, South Africa
16:00 UTC+2	Heinze 6'	(Report)		Stadium: Ellis Park Stadium; Attendance: 55,686; Referee: Wolfgang Stark (Germany)

June 17, 2010 Group stage	Argentina	4 – 1	South Korea	Johannesburg, South Africa
13:30 UTC+2	Park Chu-young 17' (o.g.); Higuaín 33', 76', 80'	(Report)	Lee Chung-yong 45+1'	Stadium: Soccer City; Attendance: 82,174; Referee: Frank De Bleeckere (Belgium)

June 22, 2010 Group stage	Greece	0 – 2	Argentina	Polokwane, South Africa
20:30 UTC+2		(Report)	Demichelis 77'; Palermo 89'	Stadium: Peter Mokaba Stadium; Attendance: 38,891; Referee: Ravshan Irmatov (Uzbekistan)

June 27, 2010 Round of 16	Argentina	3 – 1	Mexico	Johannesburg, South Africa
20:30 UTC+2	Tevez 26', 52'; Higuaín 33'	(Report)	Hernández 71'	Stadium: Soccer City; Attendance: 84,377; Referee: Roberto Rosetti (Italy)

July 3, 2010 Quarter-finals	Argentina	0 – 4	Germany	Cape Town, South Africa
16:00 UTC+2		(Report)	Müller 3'; Klose 67', 89'; Friedrich 74'	Stadium: Green Point Stadium; Attendance: 64,100; Referee: Ravshan Irmatov (Uzbekistan)

=== Women's ===
This section covers Argentina women's matches from August 1, 2009, to July 31, 2010.

==== Friendly matches ====
===== Copa Bicentenario =====
January 15, 2010 Round 1	Colombia	0 – 0	Argentina	Coquimbo, Chile
		(Report)		Stadium: Estadio Municipal Francisco Sánchez Rumoroso; Attendance: 4,000; Referee: María Belén Carvajal (Chile)

January 19, 2010 Round 2	Chile	0 – 0	Argentina	Coquimbo, Chile
		(Report)		Stadium: Estadio Municipal Francisco Sánchez Rumoroso; Attendance: 6,000; Referee: Norma González (Paraguay)

January 21, 2010 Round 3	Denmark	1 – 0	Argentina	Coquimbo, Chile
	Pedersen 84'	(Report)		Stadium: Estadio Municipal Francisco Sánchez Rumoroso; Attendance: 175; Referee: Norma González (Paraguay)

January 23, 2010 Round 4	Argentina	0 – 3	Japan	Coquimbo, Chile
		(Report)	Nakano 26'; Ando 45'; Yamaguchi 75'	Stadium: Estadio Municipal Francisco Sánchez Rumoroso; Attendance: 5,000; Referee: Carolina González (Chile)
