= 1999 Liga de Fútbol Profesional Boliviano =

The 1999 season of the Liga de Fútbol Profesional Boliviano was the 42nd season of top-tier football in Bolivia.

== Torneo Apertura ==
Pos	Team	Pld	W	D	L	GF	GA	GD	Pts
1	Blooming	22	14	2	6	47	20	+27	44
2	Bolívar	22	9	10	3	40	23	+17	37
3	Real Potosí	22	9	6	7	37	36	+1	33
4	Unión Central	22	8	7	7	37	33	+4	31
5	Independiente Petrolero	22	9	4	9	40	39	+1	31
6	Real Santa Cruz	22	9	4	9	35	49	−14	31
7	Guabirá	22	7	9	6	37	42	−5	30
8	San José	22	9	2	11	35	37	−2	29
9	Jorge Wilstermann	22	8	5	9	41	44	−3	29
10	Oriente Petrolero	22	7	5	10	35	36	−1	26
11	The Strongest	22	7	4	11	33	35	−2	25
12	Destroyers	22	5	4	13	33	56	−23	19

== Torneo Clausura ==
=== Group A ===
Pos	Team	Pld	W	D	L	GF	GA	GD	Pts
1	The Strongest	12	7	1	4	21	16	+5	22
2	Real Potosí	12	7	0	5	20	22	−2	21
3	Blooming	12	5	5	2	24	13	+11	20
4	Jorge Wilstermann	12	5	2	5	27	19	+8	17
5	Guabirá	12	3	1	8	11	17	−6	10
6	Destroyers	12	1	2	9	13	37	−24	5

=== Group B ===
Pos	Team	Pld	W	D	L	GF	GA	GD	Pts
1	Bolívar	12	8	2	2	23	10	+13	26
2	Unión Central	12	7	1	4	24	17	+7	22
3	Independiente Petrolero	12	6	2	4	20	17	+3	20
4	Real Santa Cruz	12	5	1	6	12	13	−1	16
5	Oriente Petrolero	12	4	4	4	11	14	−3	16
6	San José	12	3	1	8	12	23	−11	10

=== Final ===
Pos	Team	Pld	W	D	L	GF	GA	GD	Pts
1	The Strongest	10	6	3	1	17	10	+7	21
2	Bolívar (Note: Third Copa Libertadores 2000 place for Bolívar (2nd in both Apertura and Clausura))	10	6	1	3	15	4	+11	19
3	Blooming	10	5	1	4	17	13	+4	16
4	Unión Central	10	5	1	4	13	15	−2	16
5	Real Potosí	10	2	2	6	8	16	−8	8
6	Independiente Petrolero	10	1	2	7	12	24	−12	5

== Championship play-off ==
First Leg
15 December 1999

The Strongest	2 – 3	Blooming
González; Peña		Justiniano; Ribera

Second Leg
19 December 1999

Blooming	3 – 2	The Strongest
Antelo; Gutiérrez; Menacho		Arana; Coelho

== Promotion/relegation play-off ==
First Leg
11 December 1999

San José	1 – 0	Mariscal Braun
Cossio 69'

Second Leg
15 December 1999

Mariscal Braun	2 – 1	San José
Oliveira 20'; Netto 54'		Colque 61'
Penalties
Oliveira (penalty scored); R. Vaca (penalty scored); Grooters (penalty scored); Zabala (penalty missed); Netto (penalty scored)	4–3	(penalty scored) Angola; (penalty scored) Colque; (penalty missed) Alves; (penalty scored) I. Vaca; (penalty missed) B. Vaca

San José (Oruro) relegated; Atlético Pompeya and Mariscal Braun promoted

== Title ==
Liga de Fútbol Profesional Boliviano
1999 champion
Blooming
3rd title

== Topscorers ==
Pos	Name	Team	Goals
1	Víctor Hugo Antelo	Blooming	31
2	Antonio Vidal González	The Strongest	30
3	Leonel Liberman	Unión Central	25
4	Joaquín Botero	Bolívar	24
5	Limberg Gutiérrez	Blooming	23
6	Milton Coimbra	Oriente Petrolero	20
7	Miguel Angel Mercado	Bolívar	19
8	Marcelo Ceballos	Guabirá	15

== See also ==
- Bolivia national football team 1999
