= 2010 Copa Libertadores =

51st season of Copa Libertadores

2010 Copa Libertadores de América
2010 Copa Libertadores da América

Tournament details
- Dates: January 26–August 18
- Teams: 40 (from 11 associations)

Final positions
- Champions: (Brazil) Internacional (2nd title)
- Runners-up: (Mexico) Guadalajara

Tournament statistics
- Matches played: 138
- Goals scored: 328 (2.38 per match)
- Attendance: 2,377,325 (17,227 per match)
- Top scorer: (Brazil) Thiago Ribeiro (8 goals)
- Best player: (Brazil) Giuliano

The 2010 Copa Libertadores de América (officially the 2010 Copa Santander Libertadores for sponsorship reasons) was the 51st edition of the Copa Libertadores de América, CONMEBOL's premier international club tournament. The tournament began on January 26 and ended on August 18. During the month of June, the competition was interrupted after the conclusion of the quarterfinals due to the 2010 FIFA World Cup in South Africa.

Estudiantes were the defending champion, but they were eliminated by Brazilian team Internacional in the quarterfinals.

Internacional won the competition after defeating Guadalajara in both legs of the finals for their second Copa Libertadores title. Internacional qualified for both the 2010 FIFA Club World Cup and the 2011 Recopa Sudamericana.

== Qualified teams ==
The qualified teams include the 37 teams who qualified from their league positions and the defending champion Estudiantes of Argentina, plus Mexican clubs Guadalajara and San Luis. Those two Mexican clubs were guaranteed placement in the Round of 16, independent of the other three Mexican clubs, due to the fallout of the H1N1 flu outbreak in Mexico during the 2009 Copa Libertadores. Twenty-six teams qualified directly to the Second Stage, a group stage:

- Berths 1 to 4 from Argentina and Brazil;
- Berths 1 and 2 from the remaining eight South American football associations and Mexico.

The other 12 teams enter the competition in the First Stage, an elimination play-off stage where the winners advance to the Second Stage:

- Berths 5 and 6 from Argentina;^{[A]}
- Berth 5 from Brazil;
- Berth 3 from the remaining eight South American nations and Mexico.

Association	Team (berth)	Qualification method
(Argentina) Argentina; 5 + 1 berths	Estudiantes (Argentina 1)	2009 Copa Libertadores champion
(Argentina) Argentina; 5 + 1 berths	Vélez Sársfield (Argentina 2)	2009 Clausura champion
(Argentina) Argentina; 5 + 1 berths	Banfield (Argentina 3)	2009 Apertura champion
(Argentina) Argentina; 5 + 1 berths	Lanús (Argentina 4)	Best 2009 aggregate among non-champions
(Argentina) Argentina; 5 + 1 berths	Colón (Argentina 5)	2nd best 2009 aggregate among non-champions
(Argentina) Argentina; 5 + 1 berths	Newell's Old Boys (Argentina 6)	3rd best 2009 aggregate among non-champions
(Bolivia) Bolivia; 3 berths	Bolívar (Bolivia 1)	2009 Apertura champion
(Bolivia) Bolivia; 3 berths	Blooming (Bolivia 2)	2009 Clausura champion
(Bolivia) Bolivia; 3 berths	Real Potosí (Bolivia 3)	2009 Play-off winner
(Brazil) Brazil; 5 berths	Corinthians (Brazil 1)	2009 Copa do Brasil champion
(Brazil) Brazil; 5 berths	Flamengo (Brazil 2)	2009 Campeonato Brasileiro Série A champion
(Brazil) Brazil; 5 berths	Internacional (Brazil 3)	2009 Campeonato Brasileiro Série A runner-up
(Brazil) Brazil; 5 berths	São Paulo (Brazil 4)	2009 Campeonato Brasileiro Série A 3rd place
(Brazil) Brazil; 5 berths	Cruzeiro (Brazil 5)	2009 Campeonato Brasileiro Série A 4th place
(Chile) Chile; 3 berths	Universidad de Chile (Chile 1)	2009 Apertura champion
(Chile) Chile; 3 berths	Colo-Colo (Chile 2)	2009 Clausura champion
(Chile) Chile; 3 berths	Universidad Catolica (Chile 3)	Best-placed non-champion in the 2009 Clausura classification stage
(Colombia) Colombia; 3 berths	Once Caldas (Colombia 1)	2009 Apertura champion
(Colombia) Colombia; 3 berths	Independiente Medellín (Colombia 2)	2009 Finalización champion
(Colombia) Colombia; 3 berths	Junior (Colombia 3)	2009 Primera A best-placed non-champion
(Ecuador) Ecuador; 3 berths	Deportivo Quito (Ecuador 1)	2009 Serie A champion
(Ecuador) Ecuador; 3 berths	Deportivo Cuenca (Ecuador 2)	2009 Serie A runner-up
(Ecuador) Ecuador; 3 berths	Emelec (Ecuador 3)	2009 Serie A 3rd Place
(Paraguay) Paraguay; 3 berths	Cerro Porteño (Paraguay 1)	2009 Apertura champion
(Paraguay) Paraguay; 3 berths	Nacional (Paraguay 2)	2009 Clausura champion
(Paraguay) Paraguay; 3 berths	Libertad (Paraguay 3)	2009 Primera División best-placed non-champion
(Peru) Peru; 3 berths	Universitario (Peru 1)	2009 Descentralizado champion
(Peru) Peru; 3 berths	Alianza Lima (Peru 2)	2009 Descentralizado runner-up
(Peru) Peru; 3 berths	Juan Aurich (Peru 3)	2009 Descentralizado best-placed non-finalist
(Uruguay) Uruguay; 3 berths	Nacional (Uruguay 1)	2008–09 Primera División champion
(Uruguay) Uruguay; 3 berths	Cerro (Uruguay 2)	2009 Liguilla Pre-Libertadores winner
(Uruguay) Uruguay; 3 berths	Racing (Uruguay 3)	2009 Liguilla Pre-Libertadores runner-up
(Venezuela) Venezuela; 3 berths	Caracas (Venezuela 1)	2008−09 Primera División champion
(Venezuela) Venezuela; 3 berths	Deportivo Italia (Venezuela 2)	2008−09 Primera División runner-up
(Venezuela) Venezuela; 3 berths	Deportivo Táchira (Venezuela 3)	2008−09 Primera División best-placed non-finalist
Mexico (CONCACAF); 3 + 2 invitees	Morelia (Mexico 1)	Best-placed eligible team in the 2009 Apertura classification phase
Mexico (CONCACAF); 3 + 2 invitees	Monterrey (Mexico 2)	2010 InterLiga winner
Mexico (CONCACAF); 3 + 2 invitees	Estudiantes Tecos (Mexico 3)	2010 InterLiga runner-up
Mexico (CONCACAF); 3 + 2 invitees	Guadalajara	Special invitee due to withdrawal from the 2009 Copa Libertadores
Mexico (CONCACAF); 3 + 2 invitees	San Luis	Special invitee due to withdrawal from the 2009 Copa Libertadores

== Round and draw dates ==
The calendar shows the dates of the rounds and draw. All events occurred in 2010 unless otherwise stated. Dates in italics are only reference dates for the week the matches are to be played.

Stage	Draw date	First leg	Second leg
First stage	November 27, 2009	January 26–28	February 2–10
Second stage	November 27, 2009	February 9–April 22	
Third stage	N/A	April 27–29	May 4–6
Quarterfinals	N/A	May 12	May 20
Semifinals	N/A	July 28	August 4
Finals	N/A	August 11	August 18

== Tie-breaking criteria ==
At each stage of the tournament teams receive 3 points for a win, 1 point for a draw, and no points for a loss. Based on Article 15 in the CONMEBOL regulations, if two or more teams are equal on points, the following criteria will be applied to determine the ranking in the group stage:

1. superior goal difference;
2. higher number of goals scored;
3. higher number of away goals scored;
4. draw.

In the first stage, third stage, quarterfinals, and semifinals, a penalty shootout is carried out instead of a draw.

== First stage ==
In the First Stage, twelve teams played two-legged ties (one game at home and one game away) against another opponent. The winner of each tie advanced to the Second Stage. Team #1 played the second leg at home.

Teams			Scores		Tie-breakers		
Team #1	Points	Team #2	1st leg	2nd leg	GD	AG	Pen.
Libertad (Paraguay)	3:3	(Venezuela) Deportivo Táchira	0–1	3–1	+1:−1	—	—
Estudiantes Tecos (Mexico)	0:6	(Peru) Juan Aurich	0–2	1–2	—	—	—
Universidad Católica (Chile)	3:3	(Argentina) Colón	2–3	3–2	0:0	2:2	5–3
Cruzeiro (Brazil)	4:1	(Bolivia) Real Potosí	1–1	7–0	—	—	—
Emelec (Ecuador)	4:1	(Argentina) Newell's Old Boys	0–0	2–1	—	—	—
Racing (Uruguay)	4:1	(Colombia) Junior	2–2	2–0	—	—	—

== Second stage ==
The draw for the second stage was held at the CONMEBOL Conventions Center in Luque, Paraguay on November 27, 2009. Twenty-eight teams were drawn into eight groups with the remaining six spots to be taken by the winners from the first stage. Teams were divided into four pots; the top four Argentine and Brazilian berths were top seeds in the group stage.

In each group, teams played against each other home-and-away. The top team in each group and the top six second-placed team advanced to the Round of 16.

Key to colors in group tables
Group winners and six best runners-up advanced to the Round of 16

=== Group 1 ===
Pos	Team	Pld	W	D	L	GF	GA	GD	Pts	COR	RCM	DIM	CER
1	(Brazil) Corinthians	6	5	1	0	9	3	+6	16	—	2–1	1–0	2–1
2	(Uruguay) Racing	6	2	2	2	4	5	−1	8	0–2	—	1–0	2–1
3	(Colombia) Independiente Medellín	6	1	3	2	3	4	−1	6	1–1	0–0	—	1–0
4	(Paraguay) Cerro Porteño	6	0	2	4	3	7	−4	2	0–1	0–0	1–1	—

Legend: Blue = home team win; Yellow = draw; Red = away team win.

=== Group 2 ===
Pos	Team	Pld	W	D	L	GF	GA	GD	Pts	SÃO	ONC	MTY	NPR
1	(Brazil) São Paulo	6	4	1	1	9	2	+7	13	—	1–0	2–0	3–0
2	(Colombia) Once Caldas	6	3	2	1	8	5	+3	11	2–1	—	1–1	1–0
3	(Mexico) Monterrey	6	1	3	2	5	8	−3	6	0–0	2–2	—	2–1
4	(Paraguay) Nacional	6	1	0	5	3	10	−7	3	0–2	0–2	2–0	—

Legend: Blue = home team win; Yellow = draw; Red = away team win.

=== Group 3 ===
Pos	Team	Pld	W	D	L	GF	GA	GD	Pts	ELP	ALI	JA	BOL
1	(Argentina) Estudiantes	6	4	1	1	11	5	+6	13	—	1–0	5–1	2–0
2	(Peru) Alianza Lima	6	4	0	2	12	7	+5	12	4–1	—	2–0	1–0
3	(Peru) Juan Aurich	6	2	0	4	7	13	−6	6	0–2	4–2	—	2–0
4	(Bolivia) Bolívar	6	1	1	4	3	8	−5	4	0–0	1–3	2–0	—

Legend: Blue = home team win; Yellow = draw; Red = away team win.

=== Group 4 ===
Pos	Team	Pld	W	D	L	GF	GA	GD	Pts	LIB	UNI	LAN	BLO
1	(Paraguay) Libertad	6	3	3	0	10	3	+7	12	—	1–1	1–1	4–0
2	(Peru) Universitario	6	2	4	0	5	2	+3	10	0–0	—	2–0	0–0
3	(Argentina) Lanús	6	2	2	2	6	6	0	8	0–2	0–0	—	1–0
4	(Bolivia) Blooming	6	0	1	5	3	13	−10	1	1–2	1–2	1–4	—

Legend: Blue = home team win; Yellow = draw; Red = away team win.

=== Group 5 ===
Pos	Team	Pld	W	D	L	GF	GA	GD	Pts	INT	QUI	CRR	EME
1	(Brazil) Internacional	6	3	3	0	8	2	+6	12	—	3–0	2–0	2–1
2	(Ecuador) Deportivo Quito	6	3	1	2	5	7	−2	10	1–1	—	2–1	1–0
3	(Uruguay) Cerro	6	2	2	2	5	5	0	8	0–0	2–0	—	0–0
4	(Ecuador) Emelec	6	0	2	4	2	6	−4	2	0–0	0–1	1–2	—

Legend: Blue = home team win; Yellow = draw; Red = away team win.

=== Group 6 ===
Pos	Team	Pld	W	D	L	GF	GA	GD	Pts	NAC	BAN	MOR	CUE
1	(Uruguay) Nacional	6	3	3	0	9	4	+5	12	—	2–2	2–0	3–2
2	(Argentina) Banfield	6	3	2	1	13	8	+5	11	0–2	—	2–1	4–1
3	(Mexico) Morelia	6	1	2	3	4	8	−4	5	0–0	1–1	—	2–1
4	(Ecuador) Deportivo Cuenca	6	1	1	4	7	13	−6	4	0–0	1–4	2–0	—

Legend: Blue = home team win; Yellow = draw; Red = away team win.

=== Group 7 ===
Pos	Team	Pld	W	D	L	GF	GA	GD	Pts	VÉL	CRU	CC	ITA
1	(Argentina) Vélez Sársfield	6	4	1	1	10	5	+5	13	—	2–0	2–1	4–0
2	(Brazil) Cruzeiro	6	3	2	1	12	6	+6	11	3–0	—	4–1	2–0
3	(Chile) Colo-Colo	6	2	2	2	8	10	−2	8	1–1	1–1	—	1–0
4	(Venezuela) Deportivo Italia	6	0	1	5	4	13	−9	1	0–1	2–2	2–3	—

Legend: Blue = home team win; Yellow = draw; Red = away team win.

=== Group 8 ===
Pos	Team	Pld	W	D	L	GF	GA	GD	Pts	UCH	FLA	UC	CAR
1	Universidad de Chile	6	3	3	0	10	6	+4	12	—	2–1	0–0	1–0
2	(Brazil) Flamengo	6	3	1	2	11	9	+2	10	2–2	—	2–0	3–2
3	(Chile) Universidad Católica	6	1	4	1	5	5	0	7	2–2	2–0	—	1–1
4	(Venezuela) Caracas	6	0	2	4	5	11	−6	2	1–3	1–3	0–0	—

Legend: Blue = home team win; Yellow = draw; Red = away team win.

=== Ranking of second-placed teams ===
Grp	Team	Pld	W	D	L	GF	GA	GD	Pts
3	(Peru) Alianza Lima	6	4	0	2	12	7	+5	12
7	(Brazil) Cruzeiro	6	3	2	1	12	6	+6	11
6	(Argentina) Banfield	6	3	2	1	13	8	+5	11
2	(Colombia) Once Caldas	6	3	2	1	8	5	+3	11
4	(Peru) Universitario	6	2	4	0	5	2	+3	10
8	(Brazil) Flamengo	6	3	1	2	11	9	+2	10
5	(Ecuador) Deportivo Quito	6	3	1	2	5	7	−2	10
1	(Uruguay) Racing	6	2	2	2	4	5	−1	8

== Knockout stages ==
The last four stages of the tournament (third stage, quarterfinals, semifinals, and finals) form a single-elimination tournament, commonly known as a knockout stage. Fourteen teams will qualify for the knockout competition: the eight group winners, the six group runners-up teams with the best records plus Mexican clubs Guadalajara and San Luis. In each tie, the team with the higher seed will play at home in the second leg. In addition, each club will be able to submit a new squad with up to three player changes 24 hours before the start of their first third stage match.

=== Seeding ===
The 16 qualified teams were seeded according to their results in the Second Stage. The top teams from each group were seeded 1–8, with the team with the most points as seed 1 and the team with the least as seed 8. The second-best teams from each group were seeded 9–16, with the team with the most points as seed 9 and the team with the least as seed 16. Guadalajara and San Luis were given the 13 and 14 seed, respectively, which they had earned in the 2009 Copa Libertadores.

Teams qualified as a group winner
Seed	Team	Pts	GD	GF	AG
1	(Brazil) Corinthians	16	+6	9	4
2	(Brazil) São Paulo	13	+7	9	3
3	(Argentina) Estudiantes	13	+6	11	3
4	(Argentina) Vélez Sársfield	13	+5	10	2
5	(Paraguay) Libertad	12	+7	10	4
6	(Brazil) Internacional	12	+6	8	1
7	(Uruguay) Nacional	12	+5	9	2
8	Universidad de Chile	12	+4	10	7

Teams qualified as a group runner-up
Seed	Team	Pts	GD	GF	AG
9	(Peru) Alianza Lima	12	+5	12	5
10	(Brazil) Cruzeiro	11	+6	12	3
11	(Argentina) Banfield	11	+5	13	7
12	(Colombia) Once Caldas	11	+3	8	4
13	(Mexico) Guadalajara				
14	(Mexico) San Luis				
15	(Peru) Universitario	10	+3	5	3
16	(Brazil) Flamengo	10	+2	11	4

=== Bracket ===
Round of 16
2	(Brazil) São Paulo (p)	0	0 (3)
15	(Peru) Universitario	0	0 (1)
7	(Uruguay) Nacional	1	0
10	(Brazil) Cruzeiro	3	3
3	(Argentina) Estudiantes	1	3
14	(Mexico) San Luis	0	1
6	(Brazil) Internacional (a)	1	2
11	(Argentina) Banfield	3	0
8	U. de Chile	1	2
9	(Peru) Alianza Lima	0	2
1	(Brazil) Corinthians	0	2
16	(Brazil) Flamengo (a)	1	1
5	(Paraguay) Libertad	0	2
12	(Colombia) Once Caldas	0	1
4	(Argentina) Vélez Sársfield	0	2
13	(Mexico) Guadalajara	3	0

Quarterfinals
2	(Brazil) São Paulo	2	2
10	(Brazil) Cruzeiro	0	0
3	(Argentina) Estudiantes	0	2
6	(Brazil) Internacional (a)	1	1
8	U. de Chile (a)	3	1
16	(Brazil) Flamengo	2	2
5	(Paraguay) Libertad	0	2
13	(Mexico) Guadalajara	3	0

Semifinals
2	(Brazil) São Paulo	0	2
6	(Brazil) Internacional (a)	1	1
8	U. de Chile	1	0
13	(Mexico) Guadalajara	1	2

Finals
6	(Brazil) Internacional	2	3
13	(Mexico) Guadalajara	1	2

=== Round of 16 ===
The first match of the Round of 16 began on April 27, with the last match played on May 6. Team #1, as the higher seeded team, played the second leg at home.

Teams			Scores		Tie-breakers		
Team #1	Points	Team #2	1st leg	2nd leg	GD	AG	Pen.
Corinthians (Brazil)	3:3	(Brazil) Flamengo	0–1	2–1	0:0	0:1	—
São Paulo (Brazil)	2:2	(Peru) Universitario	0–0	0–0	0:0	0:0	3–1
Estudiantes (Argentina)	6:0	(Mexico) San Luis	1–0	3–1	—	—	—
Vélez Sársfield (Argentina)	2:3	(Mexico) Guadalajara	0–3	2–0	−1:+1	—	—
Libertad (Paraguay)	4:1	(Colombia) Once Caldas	0–0	2–1	—	—	—
Internacional (Brazil)	3:3	(Argentina) Banfield	1–3	2–0	0:0	1:0	—
Nacional (Uruguay)	0:6	(Brazil) Cruzeiro	1–3	0–3	—	—	—
Universidad de Chile	4:1	(Peru) Alianza Lima	1–0	2–2	—	—	—

=== Quarter-finals ===
The first leg of the quarter-finals took place the week of May 12, while the second leg took place the week of May 19. Team #1, as the higher seeded team, played the second leg at home.

Teams			Scores		Tie-breakers		
Team #1	Points	Team #2	1st leg	2nd leg	GD	AG	Pen.
São Paulo (Brazil)	6:0	(Brazil) Cruzeiro	2–0	2–0	—	—	—
Estudiantes (Argentina)	3:3	(Brazil) Internacional	0–1	2–1	0:0	0:1	—
Libertad (Paraguay)	2:3	(Mexico) Guadalajara	0–3	2–0	−1:+1	—	—
Universidad de Chile	3:3	(Brazil) Flamengo	3–2	1–2	0:0	3:2	—

=== Semi-finals ===
After a six-week break because of the 2010 FIFA World Cup, the first leg of the Copa Libertadores semi-finals took place the week of July 28, while the second leg took place the week of August 5.

Team 1	Agg.	Team 2	1st leg	2nd leg
Internacional (Brazil)	2–2 (a)	(Brazil) São Paulo	1–0	1–2
Guadalajara (Mexico)	3–1	Universidad de Chile	1–1	2–0

=== Finals ===
In the finals, if the finalists are tied on points after the culmination of the second leg, the winner will be the team with the best goal difference. If they are tied on goal difference, the game will move onto extra time and a penalty shootout if necessary. The away goals rule does not apply in this stage. As the last CONMEBOL team in the competition, Internacional has qualified to the 2010 FIFA Club World Cup, regardless of the results.

August 11, 2010
19:50 (UTC-5)

Guadalajara (Mexico)	1–2	(Brazil) Internacional
Bautista 45+2'	Report	Giuliano 72'; Bolívar 76'

Estadio Omnilife, Zapopan
Attendance: 30,870
Referee: Héctor Baldassi (Argentina)

August 18, 2010
22:00 (UTC-3)

Internacional (Brazil)	3–2	(Mexico) Guadalajara
Sóbis 61'; Leandro Damião 76'; Giuliano 89'	Report	Fabián 43'; Bravo 90+2'

Estádio José Pinheiro Borda (Beira-Rio), Porto Alegre
Attendance: 56,000
Referee: Óscar Ruiz (Colombia)

Internacional won the Copa Libertadores on aggregate 5-3.

Copa Libertadores de América
2010 Champion

Internacional
Second Title

== Statistics ==
=== Top goalscorers ===
Pos	Player	Team	Goals
1	(Brazil) Thiago Ribeiro	(Brazil) Cruzeiro	8
2	(Peru) José Carlos Fernández	(Peru) Alianza Lima	7
2	(Brazil) Kléber	(Brazil) Cruzeiro	7
4	(Brazil) Giuliano	(Brazil) Internacional	6
4	(Panama) Luis Tejada	(Peru) Juan Aurich	6
6	(Mexico) Omar Bravo	(Mexico) Guadalajara	5
6	(Paraguay) Rodolfo Gamarra	(Paraguay) Libertad	5
6	(Uruguay) Mario Regueiro	(Uruguay) Nacional	5
6	(Colombia) James Rodríguez	(Argentina) Banfield	5
6	(Brazil) Washington	(Brazil) São Paulo	5

=== Player of the week ===
Week	Player	Team	Notes
1	(Panama) Luis Tejada	(Peru) Juan Aurich	
2	(Paraguay) Pablo Velázquez	(Paraguay) Libertad	
3	(Argentina) Mauro Boselli	(Argentina) Estudiantes	
4	(Peru) Wilmer Aguirre	(Peru) Alianza Lima	
5	(Argentina) Sebastián Blanco	(Argentina) Lanús	
6	(Brazil) Washington	(Brazil) São Paulo	
7	(Peru) Pedro Ascoy	(Peru) Juan Aurich	
8	(Uruguay) Santiago Ostolaza	(Uruguay) Racing	
9	(Brazil) Kléber	(Brazil) Cruzeiro	
10	(Peru) José Carlos Fernández	(Peru) Alianza Lima	
11	(Uruguay) Hernán Rodrigo López	(Argentina) Vélez Sársfield	
12	(Brazil) Andrezinho	(Brazil) Internacional	
13	(Brazil) Thiago Ribeiro	(Brazil) Cruzeiro	
14	(Paraguay) Roberto Gamarra	(Paraguay) Libertad	
15	(Mexico) Omar Bravo	(Mexico) Guadalajara	
16	(Brazil) Hernanes	(Brazil) São Paulo	
17	(Brazil) Giuliano	(Brazil) Internacional	
18	(Mexico) Xavier Báez	(Mexico) Guadalajara	
19	(Argentina) Pablo Guiñazú	(Brazil) Internacional	
20	(Brazil) Tinga	(Brazil) Internacional	

== See also ==
- 2010 Copa Sudamericana
- 2011 Recopa Sudamericana
- 2010 FIFA Club World Cup

== Footnotes ==
A. Estudiantes, as the defending champion, take the Argentina 1 berth. Therefore the teams with the lowest two berths enter the First Stage
