= Julián Fernández (footballer, born 1989) =

Argentine footballer

Personal information
- Date of birth: 18 June 1989 (age 37)
- Place of birth: El Arañado, Córdoba Province, Argentina
- Height: 1.90 m (6 ft 3 in)
- Position: Centre back

Team information
- Current team: FC Messina

Youth career
- Atlético Rafaela

Senior career*
Years	Team	Apps	(Gls)
2008–2014	Atlético Rafaela	28	(3)
2009–2011	→ Argentinos Jrs. (loan)	5	(0)
2012–2013	→ Deportes La Serena (loan)	21	(2)
2014	Talleres de Córdoba	6	(0)
2015	Chacarita Juniors	17	(2)
2015–2016	Real España	14	(1)
2016	San Telmo	13	(1)
2016–2017	Chaco For Ever	21	(0)
2017–2018	Sportivo Belgrano	24	(1)
2018–2019	Gimnasia y Esgrima	1	(0)
2019	Loja	?	(1)
2020–	FC Messina	1	(0)

International career
2009	Argentina U20	6	(0)
- * Club domestic league appearances and goals as of 19:34, 21 March 2020 (UTC)

Julián Fernández (born 18 July 1989) is an Argentine footballer that plays as centre back for Italian Serie D club S.S.D. F.C. Messina.

== Club career ==
Product of Atlético Rafaela youth ranks, in 2008, Fernández was promoted to the first-adult team. His well performances at Rafaela allowed him be considered in Argentina U-20's 23-man squad for 2009 South American Youth Championship. After his participation for their youth national team, in July, he joined Argentinos Juniors where the defender won the Torneo Clausura 2010 title, which was his first professional honour. However, after fail to play at La Paternal-based team, he returned to Rafaela in mid-2011.

On 21 January 2012, Fernández moved Chilean club Deportes La Serena. He debuted against Rangers in a 2–0 away loss at Talca and his first goal came on 11 February in a 1–1 away draw too with Huachipato, which was his first goal in his third game in the tournament, having an impressive season start. On 29 July, Fernández again scored in the tournament, reaching his second goal in a 2–1 home loss with O'Higgins. However, after his impressive start at La Portada, the team was gradually deterioring their game to such an extent of relegate to the second-tier, so that he was released.

On 29 October 2019 it was reported that Fernández had joined Italian Serie D club S.S.D. F.C. Messina. However, the deal wasn't confirmed until January 2020, where his finale documents arrived before he officially could sign with Messina.

== International career ==
On 11 January 2009, Fernández was named by the coach Sergio Batista into the 23-man squad of Argentina U-20 for 2009 South American Youth Championship, where internationally debuted on 19 January in a 1–1 with Venezuela (host nation of the youth championship) at Maturín, where appeared as a starter. In principle Batista frequently put him in the starting lineup, but lost the post after a success challenge of Federico Fernández during a tournament, where Argentina failed to qualify to the FIFA U-20 World Cup held in Ghana.

== Honours ==
=== Club ===
Argentinos Juniors

- Argentine Primera División (1): 2010 Clausura
