= 2010 Copa Libertadores First Stage =

The First Stage of the 2010 Copa Santander Libertadores de América was run from January 26 to February 10.

== Matches ==
Teams			Scores		Tie-breakers		
2nd leg home team	Points	1st leg home team	1st leg	2nd leg	GD	AG	Pen.
Libertad (Paraguay)	3:3	(Venezuela) Deportivo Táchira	0–1	3–1	+1:−1	—	—
Estudiantes Tecos (Mexico)	0:6	(Peru) Juan Aurich	0–2	1–2	—	—	—
Universidad Católica (Chile)	3:3	(Argentina) Colón	2–3	3–2	0:0	2:2	5–3
Cruzeiro (Brazil)	4:1	(Bolivia) Real Potosí	1–1	7–0	—	—	—
Emelec (Ecuador)	4:1	(Argentina) Newell's Old Boys	0–0	2–1	—	—	—
Racing (Uruguay)	4:1	(Colombia) Junior	2–2	2–0	—	—	—

=== Match G1 ===
January 26, 2010
21:00 UTC−04:30

Deportivo Táchira (Venezuela)	1–0	(Paraguay) Libertad
Maita 27'	Report

Estadio Pueblo Nuevo, San Cristóbal
Attendance: 16,382
Referee: José Buitrago (Colombia)

February 2, 2010
20:10 UTC−03:00

Libertad (Paraguay)	3–1	(Venezuela) Deportivo Táchira
Rodolfo Gamarra 40'; Velázquez 67', 81'	Report	Boada 29'

Estadio Defensores del Chaco, Asunción
Attendance: 1,252
Referee: Héctor Baldassi (Argentina)

Deportivo Táchira and Libertad tied 3–3 on points. Libertad advanced on goal difference.

=== Match G2 ===
January 27, 2010
21:20 UTC−05:00

Juan Aurich (Peru)	2–0	(Mexico) Estudiantes Tecos
Tejada 11', 60'	Report

Estadio Elías Aguirre, Chiclayo
Attendance: 10,312
Referee: Pablo Pozo (Chile)

February 3, 2010
20:20 (UTC-6)

Estudiantes Tecos (Mexico)	1–2	(Peru) Juan Aurich
Bareiro 77'	Report	Tejada 41'; Ciciliano 75'

Estadio Tres de Marzo, Zapopan
Attendance: 3,000
Referee: Juan Soto (Venezuela)

Juan Aurich advanced on points 6–0.

=== Match G3 ===
January 26, 2010
20:10 UTC−03:00

Colón (Argentina)	3–2	(Chile) Universidad Católica
Nieto 5'; Fuertes 66'; Bertoglio 69'	Report	Morales 35', 81'

Estadio Brigadier Estanislao López, Santa Fe
Attendance: 14,902
Referee: Jorge Larrionda (Uruguay)

February 9, 2010
19:20 UTC−03:00

Universidad Católica (Chile)	3–2	(Argentina) Colón
Henríquez 40'; Toloza 74'; Morales 83'	Report	Moreno y Fabianesi 53'; Fuertes 55' (pen.)
Penalties
Toloza (penalty scored); Mirosevic (penalty scored); Vranjicán (penalty scored); Díaz (penalty scored); Mannara (penalty scored)	5–3	(penalty scored) Coudet; (penalty missed) Moreno y Fabianesi; (penalty scored) Pellerano; (penalty scored) Rivarola

Estadio San Carlos de Apoquindo, Santiago
Attendance: 12,272
Referee: Carlos Torres (Paraguay)

Colón and Universidad Católica tied 3–3 on points, 0–0 on goal difference, and 2–2 on away goals. Universidad Católica advanced on penalties 5–3.

=== Match G4 ===
January 27, 2010
19:50 UTC−04:00

Real Potosí (Bolivia)	1–1	(Brazil) Cruzeiro
Correa 88'	Report	Wellington Paulista 7'

Estadio Víctor Agustín Ugarte, Potosí
Attendance: 7,064
Referee: Víctor Hugo Rivera (Peru)

February 3, 2010
21:50 UTC−02:00

Cruzeiro (Brazil)	7–0	(Bolivia) Real Potosí
Wellington Paulista 29'; Thiago Ribeiro 30'; Kléber 39'; Jonathan 45'; Eliandro 87'; Bernardo 88'; Guerrón 90+1'	Report

Estádio Governador Magalhães Pinto, Belo Horizonte
Attendance: 36,574
Referee: Diego Abal (Argentina)

Cruzeiro advanced on points 4–1.

=== Match G5 ===
January 27, 2010
18:30 UTC−03:00

Newell's Old Boys (Argentina)	0–0	(Ecuador) Emelec
	Report

Estadio Marcela Bielsa, Rosario
Attendance: 15,292
Referee: Roberto Silvera (Uruguay)

February 10, 2010
21:10 UTC−05:00

Emelec (Ecuador)	2–1	(Argentina) Newell's Old Boys
Rojas 46'; Quiñónez 65'	Report	Barrientos 52'

Estadio George Capwell, Guayaquil
Attendance: 14,634
Referee: Óscar Ruiz (Colombia)

Emelec advanced 4–1 on points.

=== Match G6 ===
January 28, 2010
18:10 UTC−05:00

Junior (Colombia)	2–2	(Uruguay) Racing
Acuña 12'; Arzuaga 90+1'	Report	Mirabajes 28'; Pallas 67'

Estadio Metropolitano Roberto Meléndez, Barranquilla
Attendance: 18,026
Referee: Carlos Vera (Ecuador)

February 4, 2010
21:10 UTC−02:00

Racing (Uruguay)	2–0	(Colombia) Junior
Quiñones 14' (pen.), 88'	Report

Estadio Gran Parque Central, Montevideo
Attendance: 4,768
Referee: Paulo César de Oliveira (Brazil)

Racing advanced on points 4−1.
