= Daniel Delfino =

Argentine footballer

Personal information
- Full name: Daniel Alejandro Delfino
- Date of birth: June 1, 1970 (age 56)
- Place of birth: Temperley, Argentina
- Height: 1.76 m (5 ft 9 1/2 in)
- Position: Striker

Youth career
- Banfield

Senior career*
Years	Team	Apps	(Gls)
1988–1990	Banfield	79	(28)
1991	Quilmes	17	(2)
1991–1993	Banfield	97	(25)
1994	Rosario Central	11	(0)
1995–1996	Banfield	41	(5)
1996	San Martín (T)	14	(0)
1996–1997	Atlanta	26	(2)
1997–1999	Sportivo Italiano	61	(18)
1999	Unión Central	21	(10)
2000–2001	The Strongest	44	(35)
2001–2002	Deportivo Táchira	24	(12)
2002	Deportivo Cuenca	10	(9)
2003–2008	Carabobo FC	134	(59)
2008	Deportivo Italia	4	(0)
- * Club domestic league appearances and goals as of June 14, 2009

Daniel Alejandro Delfino (born June 1, 1970, in Temperley) is a retired football striker from Argentina, who played for several clubs in South America during his career.

== Club career ==
Delfino emerged from the youth ranks of Club Atlético Banfield. On October 1, 1988, he made his debut with El Taladro in a 2–0 victory over Chacarita. In 1991, he was loaned to first division club Quilmes. After six months playing for the cerveceros, Delfino returned to Banfield and helped the club gain promotion to the Argentine Primera in 1992. Later, he transferred to Rosario Central where he played during 1994. The following year he made his third and last spell with Banfield, playing for the club until the Clausura '96. From there, Delfino went to spend some years in second division making appearances for San Martín de Tucumán, Atlanta and Sportivo Italiano.

In 1999, he moved to Bolivia where he played for Unión Central before signing with The Strongest in 2000. With the atigrados Delfino finished as the topscorer in the Liga de Fútbol Profesional Boliviano with 28 goals that year. In July 2001, he relocated to Venezuela and joined Deportivo Táchira. After two years he transferred to Ecuadorian club Deportivo Cuenca where he had a brief stint before returning to Táchira. In 2003 Delfino moved to Carabobo FC where he played for the next five years. Finally in 2008 he made his last run with Deportivo Italia, retiring from football at age 37.

== Honours ==
Season	Club	Title
2000	The Strongest	Liga de Fútbol Profesional Boliviano top scorer: 28 goals
