= Manuel Sanhouse =

Venezuelan footballer (born 1975)

Personal information
- Full name: Manuel Alejandro Sanhouse Contreras
- Date of birth: 16 July 1975 (age 51)
- Place of birth: Mérida, Venezuela
- Height: 1.87 m (6 ft 1 1/2 in)
- Position: Goalkeeper

Youth career
- 1994–1996: Zulia

Senior career*
Years	Team	Apps	(Gls)
1997–2000	ItalChacao	38	(0)
2000	Coquimbo Unido	6	(0)
2001–2003	Caracas	61	(0)
2003	Espoli	32	(0)
2004–2012	Deportivo Táchira	84	(0)
2004–2005	→ Mérida (loan)	19	(0)
2005–2006	→ Trujillanos (loan)	21	(0)
2006–2007	→ Maracaibo (loan)	24	(0)
2012–2013	Deportivo Lara	13	(0)

International career
1999–2007	Venezuela	16	(0)
- * Club domestic league appearances and goals as of 1 December 2012

Manuel Alejandro Sanhouse Contreras (Spanish pronunciation: [maˈnwel saˈnowse], born 16 July 1975) is a Venezuelan former footballer.

He has played for his national team and also had international spells at Chilean side Coquimbo Unido and Espoli.
