= 2010 Copa Libertadores knockout stage =

The last four stages of the 2010 Copa Santander Libertadores are the knockout stages: the Round of 16, the Quarterfinals, the Semifinals, and the Finals.

== Format ==
The remaining stages of the tournament constitute a single-elimination tournament. In each stage, the teams will play an opponent in a two-legged tie on a home-away basis. Each team will earn three points for a win, one point for a draw, and zero points for a loss. The team with the most points at the end of each tie will advance. Fourteen teams will advance from the second stage; the eight group winners, the six group runners-up teams with the best records. The remaining two entries will go to Mexican clubs Guadalajara and San Luis.

=== Tie-breaking ===
The following criteria will be used for breaking ties on points:

1. Higher position in the group
2. Goal difference
3. Away goals
4. Penalty shootout

=== Seeding ===
The 16 qualified teams were seeded according to their results in the Second Stage. The top teams from each group were seeded 1–8, with the team with the most points as seed 1 and the team with the least as seed 8. The second-best teams from each group were seeded 9–16, with the team with the most points as seed 9 and the team with the least as seed 16. Guadalajara and San Luis were given the 13 and 14 seed, respectively, which they had earned in the 2009 Copa Libertadores.

Teams qualified as a group winner
Seed	Team	Pts	GD	GF	AG
1	(Brazil) Corinthians	16	+6	9	3
2	(Brazil) São Paulo	13	+7	9	2
3	(Argentina) Estudiantes	13	+6	11	5
4	(Argentina) Vélez Sársfield	13	+5	10	5
5	(Paraguay) Libertad	12	+7	10	3
6	(Brazil) Internacional	12	+6	8	2
7	(Uruguay) Nacional	12	+5	9	4
8	Universidad de Chile	12	+4	10	6

Teams qualified as a group runner-up
Seed	Team	Pts	GD	GF	AG
9	(Peru) Alianza Lima	12	+5	12	7
10	(Brazil) Cruzeiro	11	+6	12	6
11	(Argentina) Banfield	11	+5	13	8
12	(Colombia) Once Caldas	11	+3	8	5
13	(Mexico) Guadalajara				
14	(Mexico) San Luis				
15	(Peru) Universitario	10	+3	5	2
16	(Brazil) Flamengo	10	+2	11	9

== Bracket ==
Round of 16
2	(Brazil) São Paulo (p)	0	0 (3)
15	(Peru) Universitario	0	0 (1)
7	(Uruguay) Nacional	1	0
10	(Brazil) Cruzeiro	3	3
3	(Argentina) Estudiantes	1	3
14	(Mexico) San Luis	0	1
6	(Brazil) Internacional (a)	1	2
11	(Argentina) Banfield	3	0
8	U. de Chile	1	2
9	(Peru) Alianza Lima	0	2
1	(Brazil) Corinthians	0	2
16	(Brazil) Flamengo (a)	1	2
5	(Paraguay) Libertad	0	2
12	(Colombia) Once Caldas	0	1
4	(Argentina) Vélez Sársfield	0	2
13	(Mexico) Guadalajara	3	0

Quarterfinals
2	(Brazil) São Paulo	2	2
10	(Brazil) Cruzeiro	0	0
3	(Argentina) Estudiantes	0	2
6	(Brazil) Internacional (a)	1	1
8	U. de Chile (a)	3	1
16	(Brazil) Flamengo	2	2
5	(Paraguay) Libertad	0	2
13	(Mexico) Guadalajara	3	0

Semifinals
2	(Brazil) São Paulo	0	2
6	(Brazil) Internacional (a)	1	1
8	U. de Chile	1	0
13	(Mexico) Guadalajara	1	2

Finals
6	(Brazil) Internacional	2	3
13	(Mexico) Guadalajara	1	2

== Round of 16 ==
Teams			Scores		Tie-breakers		
Team #1	Points	Team #2	1st leg	2nd leg	GD	AG	Pen.
Corinthians (Brazil)	3:3	(Brazil) Flamengo	0–1	2–1	0:0	0:1	—
São Paulo (Brazil)	2:2	(Peru) Universitario	0–0	0–0	0:0	0:0	3–1
Estudiantes (Argentina)	6:0	(Mexico) San Luis	1–0	3–1	—	—	—
Vélez Sársfield (Argentina)	3:3	(Mexico) Guadalajara	0–3	2–0	−1:+1	—	—
Libertad (Paraguay)	4:1	(Colombia) Once Caldas	0–0	2–1	—	—	—
Internacional (Brazil)	3:3	(Argentina) Banfield	1–3	2–0	0:0	1:0	—
Nacional (Uruguay)	0:6	(Brazil) Cruzeiro	1–3	0–3	—	—	—
Universidad de Chile	4:1	(Peru) Alianza Lima	1–0	2–2	—	—	—

=== Match A ===
April 28, 2010
21:50 UTC−03:00

Flamengo (Brazil)	1–0	(Brazil) Corinthians
Adriano 66' (pen.)	Report

Estádio Mário Filho (Maracanã), Rio de Janeiro
Attendance: 72,442
Referee: Carlos Amarilla (Paraguay)

May 5, 2010
21:50 UTC−03:00

Corinthians (Brazil)	2–1	(Brazil) Flamengo
David 28' (o.g.); Ronaldo 39'	Report	Vágner Love 49'

Estádio Municipal Paulo Machado de Carvalho (Pacaembú), São Paulo
Attendance: 35,561
Referee: Roberto Silvera (Uruguay)

Corinthians 3–3 Flamengo on points. Flamengo advanced on away goals.

=== Match B ===
April 28, 2010
17:30 UTC−05:00

Universitario (Peru)	0–0	(Brazil) São Paulo
	Report

Estadio Monumental, Lima
Attendance: 37,034
Referee: Saúl Laverni (Argentina)

May 4, 2010
19:30 UTC−03:00

São Paulo (Brazil)	0–0	(Peru) Universitario
	Report
Penalties
Ceni (penalty missed); Hernanes (penalty scored); Marcelinho (penalty scored); Dagoberto (penalty scored)	3–1	(penalty scored) Ramírez; (penalty missed) Alva; (penalty missed) Galván; (penalty missed) Labarthe

Estádio Cícero Pompeu de Toledo (Morumbi), São Paulo
Attendance: 43,838
Referee: Carlos Torres (Paraguay)

São Paulo 2–2 Universitario on points. São Paulo advanced on penalties.

=== Match C ===
April 27, 2010
18:45 UTC−05:00

San Luis (Mexico)	0–1	(Argentina) Estudiantes
	Report	González 25'

Estadio Alfonso Lastras, San Luis Potosí
Attendance: 5,666
Referee: Juan Soto (Venezuela)

May 5, 2010
19:30 UTC−03:00

Estudiantes (Argentina)	3–1	(Mexico) San Luis
González 4'; Benítez 50', 55'	Report	de la Torre 7'

Estadio Centenario, Quilmes
Attendance: 9,359
Referee: Víctor Hugo Carrillo (Peru)

Estudiantes advanced on points 6–0.

=== Match D ===
April 27, 2010
21:00 UTC−05:00

Guadalajara (Mexico)	3–0	(Argentina) Vélez Sársfield
Bravo 25', 79'; Reynoso 90+2' (pen.)	Report

Estadio Jalisco, Guadalajara
Attendance: 8,322
Referee: Óscar Ruiz (Colombia)

May 4, 2010
21:50 UTC−03:00

Vélez Sársfield (Argentina)	2–0	(Mexico) Guadalajara
Silva 3'; Zárate 88'	Report

Estadio José Amalfitani, Buenos Aires
Attendance: 10,055
Referee: Wilson Seneme (Brazil)

Vélez Sársfield 3–3 Guadalajara on points. Guadalajara advanced on goal difference.

=== Match E ===
April 29, 2010
21:30 UTC−05:00

Once Caldas (Colombia)	0–0	(Paraguay) Libertad
	Report

Estadio Palogrande, Manizales
Attendance: 10,981
Referee: Salvio Fagundes (Brazil)

May 6, 2010
21:00 UTC−04:00

Libertad (Paraguay)	2–1	(Colombia) Once Caldas
Rob. Gamarra 73' (pen.), 89'	Report	Moreno 55'

Estadio Defensores del Chaco, Asunción
Attendance: 2,000
Referee: Sergio Pezzotta (Argentina)

Libertad advanced on points 4–1.

=== Match F ===
April 28, 2010
21:50 UTC−03:00

Banfield (Argentina)	3–1	(Brazil) Internacional
Rodríguez 47'; Battión 59'; Fernández 81'	Report	Kléber 50'

Estadio Florencio Sola, Banfield
Attendance: 6,794
Referee: Jorge Larrionda (Uruguay)

May 6, 2010
19:30 UTC−03:00

Internacional (Brazil)	2–0	(Argentina) Banfield
Alecsandro 42'; Walter 58'	Report

Estádio José Pinheiro Borda (Beira-Rio), Porto Alegre
Attendance: 34,643
Referee: William Roldán (Colombia)

Internacional 3–3 Banfield on points. Internacional advanced on away goals.

=== Match G ===
April 29, 2010
19:00 UTC−03:00

Cruzeiro (Brazil)	3–1	(Uruguay) Nacional
Thiago Ribeiro 7', 22', 42'	Report	Regueiro 51'

Estádio Governador Magalhães Pinto (Mineirão), Belo Horizonte
Attendance: 32,254
Referee: Héctor Baldassi (Argentina)

May 5, 2010
21:50 UTC−03:00

Nacional (Uruguay)	0–3	(Brazil) Cruzeiro
	Report	Thiago Ribeiro 29'; Diego Renan 48'; Gilberto 80'

Estadio Parque Central, Montevideo
Attendance: 13,919
Referee: Federico Beligoy (Argentina)

Cruzeiro advanced on points 6–0.

=== Match H ===
April 29, 2010
19:15 UTC−05:00

Alianza Lima (Peru)	0–1	Universidad de Chile
	Report	Rivarola 86'

Estadio Alejandro Villanueva, Lima
Attendance: 29,247
Referee: Carlos Simon (Brazil)

May 6, 2010
21:00 UTC−04:00

Universidad de Chile	2–2	(Peru) Alianza Lima
Vargas 63'; Seymour 90+2'	Report	Fernández 24', 87'

Estadio Monumental, Santiago
Attendance: 28,663
Referee: Carlos Vera (Ecuador)

Universidad de Chile advanced on points 4–1.

== Quarterfinals ==
Teams			Scores		Tie-breakers		
Team #1	Points	Team #2	1st leg	2nd leg	GD	AG	Pen.
Universidad de Chile	3:3	(Brazil) Flamengo	3–2	1–2	0:0	3:2	—
São Paulo (Brazil)	6:0	(Brazil) Cruzeiro	2–0	2–0	—	—	—
Estudiantes (Argentina)	3:3	(Brazil) Internacional	0–1	2–1	0:0	0:1	—
Libertad (Paraguay)	3:3	(Mexico) Guadalajara	0–3	2–0	−1:+1	—	—

=== Match S1 ===
May 12, 2010
19:30 UTC−03:00

Flamengo (Brazil)	2–3	Universidad de Chile
Adriano 39'; Juan 88'	Report	Victorino 4'; Olarra 24'; Fernández 47'

Estádio Mário Filho (Maracanã), Rio de Janeiro
Attendance: 72,442
Referee: Carlos Amarilla (Paraguay)

May 20, 2010
21:15 UTC−04:00

Universidad de Chile	1–2	(Brazil) Flamengo
Montillo 73'	Report	Vágner Love 45'; Adriano 78'

Estadio Santa Laura, Santiago
Attendance: 14,450
Referee: Roberto Silvera (Uruguay)

Universidad de Chile 3–3 Flamengo on points. Universidad de Chile advanced on away goals.

=== Match S2 ===
May 12, 2010
21:50 UTC−03:00

Cruzeiro (Brazil)	0–2	(Brazil) São Paulo
	Report	Dagoberto 23'; Hernanes 65'

Estádio Governador Magalhães Pinto (Mineirão), Belo Horizonte
Attendance: 48,602
Referee: Óscar Ruiz (Colombia)

May 19, 2010
21:50 UTC−03:00

São Paulo (Brazil)	2–0	(Brazil) Cruzeiro
Hernanes 23'; Dagoberto 53'	Report

Estádio Cícero Pompeu de Toledo (Morumbi), São Paulo
Attendance: 52,196
Referee: Jorge Larrionda (Uruguay)

São Paulo advanced on points 6–0.

=== Match S3 ===
May 13, 2010
21:15 UTC−03:00

Internacional (Brazil)	1–0	(Argentina) Estudiantes
Sorondo 88'	Report

Estádio José Pinheiro Borda (Beira-Rio), Porto Alegre
Attendance: 40,115
Referee: Roberto Silvera (Uruguay)

May 20, 2010
19:45 UTC−03:00

Estudiantes (Argentina)	2–1	(Brazil) Internacional
González 19'; Pérez 21'	Report	Giuliano 88'

Estadio Centenario, Quilmes
Attendance: 14,500
Referee: Óscar Ruiz (Colombia)

Estudiantes 3–3 Internacional on points. Internacional advanced on away goals.

=== Match S4 ===
May 11, 2010
20:15 UTC−05:00

Guadalajara (Mexico)	3–0	(Paraguay) Libertad
Bravo 7', 80'; Vázquez 29'	Report

Estadio Jalisco, Guadalajara
Attendance: 15,011
Referee: Pablo Pozo (Chile)

May 18, 2010
21:15 UTC−04:00

Libertad (Paraguay)	2–0	(Mexico) Guadalajara
Román 20'; Maciel 68'	Report

Estadio Defensores del Chaco, Asunción
Attendance: 260
Referee: Héctor Baldassi (Argentina)

Libertad 3–3 Guadalajara on points. Guadalajara advanced on goal difference.

== Semifinals ==
Teams			Scores		Tie-breakers		
Team #1	Points	Team #2	1st leg	2nd leg	GD	AG	Pen.
Universidad de Chile	1:4	(Mexico) Guadalajara	1–1	0–2	—	—	—
São Paulo (Brazil)	3:3	(Brazil) Internacional	0–1	2–1	0:0	0:1	—

=== Match F1 ===
July 27, 2010
20:15 UTC−05:00

Guadalajara (Mexico)	1–1	Universidad de Chile
Arellano 52'	Report	Olarra 47'

Estadio Azteca, Mexico City
Attendance: 80,000
Referee: Juan Soto (Venezuela)

August 3, 2010
21:15 UTC−04:00

Universidad de Chile	0–2	(Mexico) Guadalajara
	Report	Báez 22'; Magallón 55'

Estadio Nacional, Santiago
Attendance: 40,060
Referee: Sergio Pezzotta (Argentina)

Guadalajara advanced 4–1 on points.

=== Match F2 ===
July 28, 2010
21:50 UTC−03:00

Internacional (Brazil)	1–0	(Brazil) São Paulo
Giuliano 68'	Report

Estádio José Pinheiro Borda (Beira-Rio), Porto Alegre
Attendance: 48,166
Referee: Héctor Baldassi (Argentina)

August 5, 2010
21:50 UTC−03:00

São Paulo (Brazil)	2–1	(Brazil) Internacional
Alex Silva 30'; Ricardo Oliveira 54'	Report	Alecsandro 52'

Estádio Cícero Pompeu de Toledo (Morumbi), São Paulo
Attendance: 62,129
Referee: Carlos Amarilla (Paraguay)

São Paulo 3–3 Internacional on points. Internacional advanced on away goals.

== Finals ==
August 11, 2010
19:50 UTC−05:00

Guadalajara (Mexico)	1–2	(Brazil) Internacional
Bautista 45+2'	Report	Giuliano 72'; Bolívar 76'

Estadio Omnilife, Zapopan
Attendance: 30,870
Referee: Héctor Baldassi (Argentina)

August 18, 2010
22:00 UTC−03:00

Internacional (Brazil)	3–2	(Mexico) Guadalajara
Rafael Sóbis 61'; Leandro Damião 76'; Giuliano 89'	Report	Fabián 43'; Bravo 90+2'

Estádio José Pinheiro Borda (Beira-Rio), Porto Alegre
Attendance: 56,000
Referee: Óscar Ruiz (Colombia)

Internacional won the Copa Libertadores on points 6-0.
