= Julio César Hurtado =

Bolivian footballer (born 1983)

Personal information
- Date of birth: December 25, 1983 (age 42)
- Place of birth: Santa Cruz de la Sierra, Bolivia
- Height: 1.72 m (5 ft 8 in)
- Position: Midfielder

Senior career*
Years	Team	Apps	(Gls)
2002–2004	Blooming	46	(4)
2005	→ La Paz (loan)	28	(2)
2006	Blooming	23	(2)
2007	→ The Strongest (loan)	24	(1)
2008–2009	→ Aurora (loan)	57	(9)
2010	Blooming	15	(0)
2011	→ Guabirá (loan)	7	(0)

International career^{‡}
2009	Bolivia	1	(0)
- * Club domestic league appearances and goals as of October 20, 2010 ‡ National team caps and goals as of March 28, 2009

Julio César Hurtado, nicknamed Cacho (born December 25, 1983), is a retired Bolivian footballer whose last club was Guabirá in the Bolivian league.

== Club career ==
Nicknamed "Cacho", Hurtado saw his football career start off playing for his hometown club Blooming. After a season of inconsistency and lack of playing time, he was loaned to La Paz F.C. where he earned his place in the starting line-up from the beginning. Since his level improved, Blooming decided to bring him back for the 2006 season, but he did not live up to the expectations. In 2007, he transferred to The Strongest. As an atigrado Hurtado played in 24 games and scored one goal, but before the season ended he was expelled from the team due to insubordination acts. Willing to clean up his image, he joined Aurora in 2008, and since his arrival he became one of the key players for the team. During the Clausura 2008, Hurtado helped Aurora obtain the first national title in club history after defeating Blooming in the finals. After two seasons loaned at Aurora, Hurtado returned to Blooming for his third stint. On April 28, 2010, while playing a league match against San José, Hurtado found himself involved in an argument with the referee. Consequently, he used violent language and attempted to assault him if it wasn't for his teammates´intervention. Two weeks later, he received a 20-game suspension by league officials.

== International career ==
Hurtado received his first and only call-up to the Bolivia national team for a 2010 World Cup Qualifier match to play against Colombia in Bogotá on March 28, 2009.

== Honours ==
Season	Club	Title
2008 (C)	Aurora	Liga de Fútbol Profesional Boliviano
