= Leonel Liberman =

Argentine footballer

Leonel Andrés Liberman (born May 26, 1972, in Buenos Aires) is a former Argentine footballer who played as a journeyman footballer for clubs in his native country, Bolivia, Brazil, Chile, Colombia, Ecuador, Israel and Uruguay.

== Teams ==
- (Argentina) All Boys 1990
- (Argentina) Argentinos Juniors 1991–1992
- (Argentina) Racing Club 1993–1994
- (Chile) San Marcos de Arica 1994
- (Israel) Maccabi Petah-Tikva 1995–1996
- (Israel) Hapoel Jerusalem 1997
- (Ecuador) Tecnico Universitario (Ambato) 1998
- (Colombia) Independiente Santa Fe 1998
- (Bolivia) Unión Central 1999
- (Bolivia) Oriente Petrolero 2000
- (Argentina) Almagro 2000
- (Bolivia) Bolivar 2001
- (Brazil) Náutico Recife 2002
- (Ecuador) Deportivo Cuenca 2002–2003
- (Uruguay) Defensor Sporting 2003
- (Argentina) Chacarita Juniors 2004
- (Ecuador) Emelec 2004
- (Brazil) Guarani 2004
- (Argentina) Deportivo Santamarina 2005–2006
- (Brazil) América 2006
