= Deportivo Miranda F.C. =

Venezuelan football club

Deportivo Miranda
- Full name: Deportivo Miranda Fútbol Club
- Nicknames: Los Petareños; Los del bloque Parroquiales
- Founded: 18 August 1948; 78 years ago
- Ground: Estadio Brígido Iriarte; Caracas, Venezuela
- Capacity: 23,940
- Chairman: Angel Hernandez
- Manager: Lino Parrella
- League: Segunda División
- 2025: Semifinal
| Home colours | Away colours | Third colours |

Deportivo Miranda Fútbol Club (previously named Deportivo Italia Fútbol Club, Deportivo Italchacao, Deportivo Petare Fútbol Club and Petare Fútbol Club) is a Venezuelan football club based in Caracas. Formed in 1948 as "Deportivo Italia F.C.", the club after fifty years merged with "Deportivo Chacao F.C." in 1998, and was called Deportivo Italchacao for eight years. The club has won the Primera División Venezolana five times and the Copa de Venezuela three times.

== History ==
=== Early history ===
See also simple:Deportivo Italia (1948-2010)

The team was founded in August 1948 by a group of Italian immigrants: Carlo Pescifeltri, Lorenzo Tommasi, Bruno Bianchi, Giordano Valentini, Samuel Rovatti, Angelo Bragaglia, Giovanni di Stefano, Alfredo Giuseppe Pane and Sacchi. Deportivo Italia in the 1960s soon became the most important Venezuelan Football Team, popularly called "Los Azules" (Azzurri) by the color of the team shirt inspired by the Italy national team.

Indeed, the arrival in Venezuela of hundreds of thousands of Europeans after the Second World War became a reason, among other things, in creating football teams for the different "colonies" of immigrants. Thus the Italians had their Deportivo Italia (while the Portuguese the "Deportivo Portugues", the Spanish Gallegos the Deportivo Galicia, the Canarian immigrants their "Unión Deportiva Canarias ", etc. ...).

The early years of "Los Azules" were characterized by limited success. But in 1958 began – thanks to the "D'Ambrosio management" – the golden age of the team, which lasted until the late seventies: between 1961 and 1972, every year Deportivo Italia won an award nationally and/or internationally.

=== Mino D'Ambrosio and the Golden Era ===
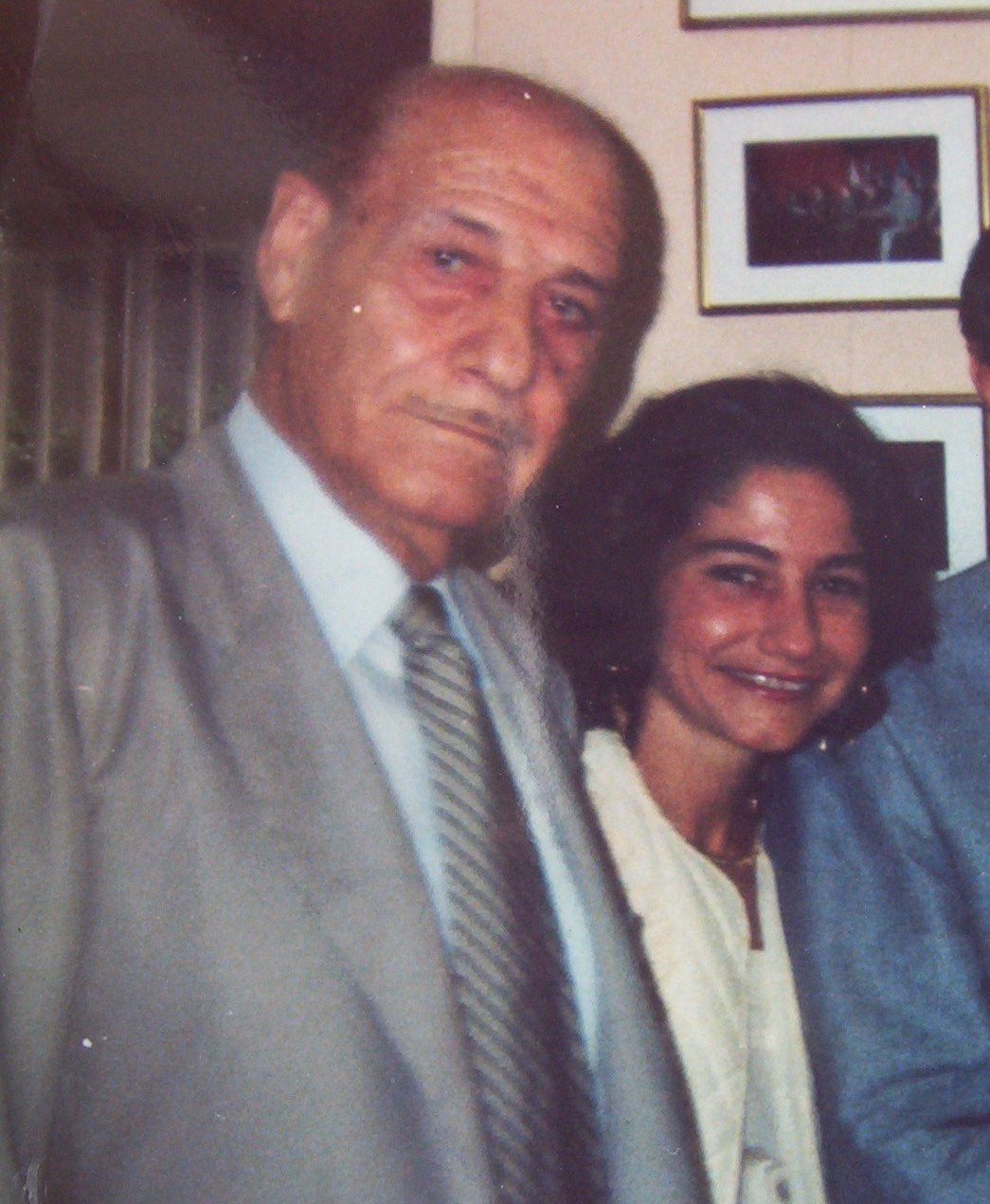
Pompeo D'Ambrosio

In 1958 Mino D'Ambrosio took control of the Deportivo Italia and with his brother Pompeo D'Ambrosio (who financially controlled the team) the "Azzurri" reached the highest honors in football in Venezuela. The "D'Ambrosio Golden Era" lasted until 1978 and was characterized by four national titles and the famous Little Maracanazo in 1971. Also won three times the Copa Venezuela: in 1961, 1962 and 1970 (and was second in 1976).

The age of the 1960s was the Golden Era for the Azules, as they were national champions in 1961, 1963 and 1966 (their trainer was the famous Orlando Fantoni). The fourth championship was obtained in 1972 (along with three victories in the "Copa Venezuela"). The Italo-venezuelan team was also the runner-up in 1965, 1968, 1969, 1970 and 1971. Practically, between 1961 and 1972,every year the Deportivo Italia of Mino D'Ambrosio won an award (or an outstanding result in the Copa Libertadores).

Also – in those years of "D'Ambrosio management" – in friendly tournaments the Deportivo Italia Italy won some European teams (like the Milan of Italy in 1968) and was the first Venezuelan team (in the entire history of football of Venezuela) to go to the second round of the Copa Libertadores (1964).

==== First performance of Venezuela in the "Copa Libertadores de America" ====
Venezuela's debut in the "Copa Libertadores de America" was in 1964 with Deportivo Italia of the capital of the Republic. The "Azules" was the Venezuelan champion of 1963. Tulio Charter raised the desire to participate in the South American tournament, before the South American Football Confederation.

After lengthy discussions with the delegates representing the South American Confederation, it was agreed to include the representative team of Venezuela and was assigned as the first rival the "Bahia" of Brazil, who was the runner-up in that country.

This fact meant a great responsibility for the Deportivo Italia and Mino D'Ambrosio hired three reinforcements: Brazilians Roberto from the Fluminense (who was a central defender), Zequinha (good right back who came from Botafogo) and striker Ferreira from Madureira FC. The two matches were played in Caracas due to commitments of the "Bahia" in the United States and Europe.

The first match was played on 8 March 1964, and ended in a tie with no goals: it was seen by some 20,000 people in the Caracas Olympic Stadium. The second match ended 2 to 1 for the Deportivo Italia. The goals were achieved by Jaime and Elranildo (both Brazilians). So the first Venezuelan goal in the Libertadores Cup was scored by Jaime (left wing of Deportivo Italia on 7 April 1964, in the Olympic Stadium in Caracas and in front of 18,000 people, at the 52-minute of the match).

Other players who represented Venezuela's Deportivo Italia in the 1964 "Copa Libertadores de America": Fernando Fantoni, Linda, Benito Fantoni, Gustavo González, José "Papito" Gonzalez, Jaime, Danilo Marin, Fiho and the Italo-venezuelan Agostino Nitti.

==== "Little Maracanazo" ====
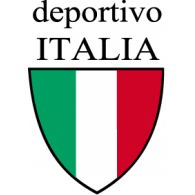
Original Coat of Arms created by Mino D'Ambrosio

In 1971, the Deportivo Italia, Venezuela's Champion of the 1971 season, defeated the Fluminense FC, Champion of Brazil, 1:0 (with a goal done by central defender Tenorio) at the Maracana stadium.

The Deportivo Italia – under the direct supervision of Mino D'Ambrosio – that night went to the match with Vito Fasano (who for his performance was recruited in Brazil, Vito is Italian) as goalkeeper. At the defence there were Carlos "Chiquichagua" Marín, Tenorio, Vincente Arrud and Freddie Elie, while as midfielders Delman "Pito" Useche, Negri and Rui. In the attack played Alcyr (who was replaced by Bahia), Beto and Militello.

In the magazine "Incontri" of Caracas, Bruno D'Ambrosio (who saw the match and followed the team as son of Pompeo) wrote that in the final half-hour the goalkeeper Vito Fassano did miracles: three hits to the poles helped him, but while two knocked externally the door defended by Fassano, the third would have been a goal if the goalkeeper had not deflected it with his fingers stretching in an incredible way. Fassano made the best game of his life, according to all the persons who saw the match.

Santander Laya-Garrido, who wrote the book "Los Italianos forjadores de la nacionalidad y del desarrollo economico en Venezuela", said that since then no other Venezuela football team has obtained a similar international result: until now the "Little Maracanazo" is the top international victory in the history of the soccer in Venezuela

=== Italchacao ===
After the untimely death of Mino D'Ambrosio in 1980 (much lamented by the entire Italian community in Venezuela), Deportivo Italia failed to maintain the leadership in the Venezuelan football: the "Azules" earned only a modest runner-up title in 1984.

In July 1996, the Italo-venezuelan team suffered a severe economic crisis and gave the franchise through a bilateral agreement with the Mayor of Chacao Municipality in Caracas. Later, the Mayor of Chacao Irene Sáez and the President of Deportivo Italia, Mr. Eligio Restifo, through the intervention of Mr. Jaime Meier and Brazil's Sports Minister (Mr Edson Arantes Do Nascimento – Pelé -), entered into discussions with executives of Parmalat in São Paulo. The Italian multinational Parmalat, after studying the case, decided to invest in the Venezuelan football. Thus, in August 1996, they founded the Football Club Deportivo Chacao.

Subsequently, in August 1998, by joint resolution of the boards of Parmalat, the Italian Association and Deportivo Chacao FC, agreed to change the name of the club to Football Club Deportivo Italchacao, s.a., in order to preserve the colors, logos and the history of more than 50 years of the Deportivo Italia.

Italchacao was the Champion of Venezuela in the 1998–1999 season, after beating Deportivo Táchira 5 to 1 in Caracas and 2 to 1 in San Cristóbal. The Italchacao added another star to the logo of the 4 stars earned by Deportivo Italia, and earned the right to represent Venezuela in the 1999 Pre-Libertadores tournament against Mexican clubs.

Later in the season 1999–2000, the Italchacao was runner-up in the National Championship, winning back the right to represent Venezuela in the "Pre-Libertadores" 2000 tournament against Mexican clubs.

In the 2000–2001 season, the "Deportivo Italchacao" won the right to represent Venezuela at the Copa Club Merconorte 2001. The italo-venezuelan team played with Mexico (Guadalajara), Colombia (Millonarios of Bogotá) and the United States (MetroStars of New York): Italchacao won 4 of the 6 matches (with a Guadalajara forfeit) of the group B, but even so was eliminated because of goal difference with Millonarios.

In the group B of the 2001 Copa Merconorte, there were the following results:

| Team (group B) | Pts | Pld | W | D | L | GF | GA | GD | Matches with Deportivo Italchacao |
|---|---|---|---|---|---|---|---|---|---|
| (Colombia) Millonarios | 12 | 6 | 4 | 0 | 2 | 10 | 7 | +3 | Millonarios 5:0 Italchacao -------- Italchacao 3:0 Millonarios |
| (Venezuela) Deportivo Italchacao | 12 | 6 | 4 | 0 | 2 | 9 | 8 | +1 | |
| (United States) MetroStars | 9 | 6 | 3 | 0 | 3 | 8 | 5 | +3 | MetroStars 2:0 Italchacao -------- Italchacao 2:1 MetroStars |
| (Mexico) C.D. Guadalajara | 3 | 6 | 1 | 0 | 5 | 3 | 10 | −7 | Guadalajara forf. Italchacao ----- Italchacao 2:0 Guadalajara |

Among the players who have passed through its ranks since the nineties until today worth mentioning, there are (among others) Manuel Sanhouse, Gilberto Angelucci, Ailton Da Silva, Rogerio Pereira, Ruben Forestello, Giovanni Perez, Héctor Pablo Bidoglio, Rubén Yori, Emilio Renteria Alejandro Cichero and Félix José Hernández. Among the idols of his fans are Leopoldo Jiménez, Daniel Ten, Vicente Suanno and Cristian Casseres.

=== Back to the name "Deportivo Italia" ===
For the 2006/2007 season the team returned to its original name Deportivo Italia Fútbol Club. In the 2007/2008 season the team was in sixth place when the management board at the end of the campaign decided not to continue to lead the team and gave the "Azules" leadership to Mario Hernández Cova.

In 2008, with manager Eduardo Saragó, Deportivo Italia won the "Torneo Apertura", beating Aragua FC (0–2) on 30 November, and this victory qualified the "Azules" for the 2010 Copa Libertadores.

In the 2009/2010 season ranked third in the table and gained the right to play the "Pre-Libertadores" of 2011. In the "Clausura 2010" the "Azules" obtained good results.

=== Name change: Deportivo Petare ===
Deportivo Petare logo

Deportivo Italia changed their name to "Deportivo Petare" in the summer of 2010 as a result of an alliance with the Sucre Municipality in the Miranda state and private entrepreneurs, turning into a social project based in Petare looking to bring opportunities for the community's youth to develop into professional footballers. The rebranded club also hoped to appeal to Petare's residents given that the club's attendance numbers were among the worst of the league, in spite of its performances. There is an ongoing dispute because of the strong opposition from the Italian community in Caracas. Five years later, with the arrival of a new Board and still wishing to link the Petare community to the club, the club changed its name again, dropping the word "Deportivo".

=== Deportivo Miranda ===
On 9 February 2023, the club changed their name again, now to Deportivo Miranda, for the 2023 season.

== Stadium ==
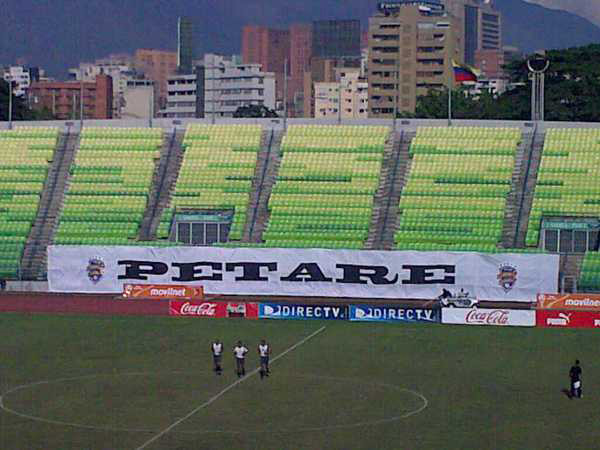
The Olimpico stadium of Deportivo Petare.

The club plays at the Estadio Olímpico de la UCV, which has a capacity of 23,940.

== Honours ==
=== National ===
- Primera División Venezolana
  - Winners (5): 1961, 1963, 1966, 1972, 1999 (as Deportivo Italchacao)
- Copa de Venezuela
  - Winners (3): 1961, 1962, 1970

== Current roster ==
Note: Flags indicate national team as defined under FIFA eligibility rules; some limited exceptions apply. Players may hold more than one non-FIFA nationality.

| No. | Pos. | Nation | Player |
|---|---|---|---|
| 1 | GK | VEN | Yondairo Amador |
| 3 | DF | VEN | José Ascanio |
| 4 | DF | VEN | Víctor Sifontes |
| 5 | MF | VEN | Luis Villae |
| 6 | DF | VEN | Óscar Jiménez |
| 7 | MF | VEN | Edwin Gallego |
| 8 | MF | VEN | Óscar Linares |
| 9 | FW | VEN | Luis Annese |
| 10 | FW | VEN | Marco Coronado |
| 11 | DF | VEN | Giovanni Quatromani |
| 13 | DF | VEN | Julio da Silva |
| 14 | MF | VEN | Derwuinson Vargas |
| 15 | MF | VEN | Andrés Hernández |

| No. | Pos. | Nation | Player |
|---|---|---|---|
| 16 | MF | VEN | Willimger Castillo |
| 17 | FW | VEN | Juan Ramirez |
| 18 | FW | VEN | Santiago Escorihuela |
| 19 | FW | VEN | William Arismendi |
| 20 | DF | VEN | Andrés Maldonado (captain) |
| 22 | GK | VEN | Diego González |
| 23 | FW | VEN | Klinsmann Yendis |
| 25 | GK | VEN | Jesús Vega |
| 27 | MF | VEN | Leonardo Torrealba |
| 29 | DF | VEN | Arón Angulo |
| 30 | MF | VEN | Radamés Davis |
| 44 | DF | VEN | Luisbert Salazar |

== Copa Libertadores participation ==
The club played in the Copa Libertadores de America on seven occasions, with the following performance:

- Qualifications: Quarters (1969) and First Round (1964,1966,1967,1971,1972 and 1985).
- Most famous victory: 3 March 1971 (in Rio de Janeiro/Maracaná stadium) D.Italia 1:0 Fluminense (Champion of Brasil), with goal of M. Tenorio.
- Best home victory: 5 March 1969 (in Caracas) D.Italia 2:0 Unión Magdalena (Colombia), with goals of Maravic and Nitti.
- Best outside victory: 1 March 1966 (in Lima) D.Italia 2:1 Alianza Lima (Peru), with 2 goals of Zeica.
- Best performance: Quarters in 1969 Copa Libertadores.

=== Matches ===
The matches done by Deportivo Italia in the Libertadores are (within parenthesis the players who did goals):

Copa Libertadores 1964 (as Venezuela Champion)

- Preliminary: 03/04/64 (in Caracas) D.Italia 0:0 Bahia
- Preliminary: 07/04/64 (in Caracas) D.Italia 2:1 Bahia (Jaime, Iranildo)
- First Round: 3 May 1964 (in Guayaquil) D.Italia 1:0 Barcelona (Zequinha)
- First Round: 7 May 1964 (in Santiago de Chile) D.Italia 0:4 Colo-Colo
- First Round: 17 May 1964 (in Caracas) D.Italia 1:2 Colo-Colo (Jaime)
- First Round: 24 May 1964 (in Caracas) D.Italia 0:3 Barcelona

Copa Libertadores 1966 (as Venezuela runner-up)

- First Round: 5 February 1966 (in Caracas) D.Italia 1:1 Lara (A.Nitti)
- First Round: 9 February 1966 (in Caracas) D.Italia 2:2 Universitario (Zeica, Tacoronte)
- First Round: 12 February 1966 (in Caracas) D.Italia 3:1 Alianza Lim (Tacoronte, Zeica, Nitti)
- First Round: 17 February 1966 (inCaracas) D.Italia 0:3 River Plate
- First Round: 23 February 1966 (in Caracas) D.Italia 1:2 Boca Juniors (Vicente)
- First Round: 1 March 1966 (in Lima) D.Italia 2:1 Alianza Lima (Zeica, 2 goals)
- First Round: 8 March 1966 (in Buenos Aires) D.Italia 2:5 Boca Junior (Nitti, 2 goals)
- First Round: 10 March 1966 (in Buenos Aires) D.Italia 1:2 River Plate (Nitti)
- First Round: 13 March 1966 (in Lima) D.Italia 2:1 Universitario (Nitti, Tacoronte)
- First Round: 17 March 1966 (in Caracas) D.Italia 1:0 Lara (A. Nitti)

Copa Libertadores 1967 (as Venezuela Champion)

- First Round: 11 February 1967 (in Caracas) D.Italia 1:0 D.Galicia (Elmo)
- First Round: 22 February 1967 (in Caracas) D.Italia 0:3 Cruzeiro
- First Round: 11 March 1967 (in Lima) D.Italia 0:3 Universitario
- First Round: 15 March 1967 (in Lima) D.Italia 2:5 Sport Boys (Dirceu, Cazorla: autogoal)
- First Round: 20 March 1967 (in Belo Horizonte) D.Italia 0:4 Cruzeiro
- First Round: 25 March 1967 (in Lima) D.Italia 0:0 Sport Boys
- First Round: 28 March 1967 (in Lima) D.Italia 0:1 Universitario
- First Round: 19 April 1967 (in Caracas) D.Italia 0:0 D.Galicia

Copa Libertadores 1969 (as Venezuela runner-up)

- First Round: 23 February 1969 (in Caracas) D.Italia 2:0 U.D.Canarias (Mateo, Nitti)
- First Round:1 March 1969 (in Caracas) D.Italia 2:1 Deportivo Cali (M. Mateo, 2 goals)
- First Round: 5 March 1969 (in Caracas) D.Italia 2:0 Unión Magdalena (Maravic, Nitti)
- First Round: 9 March 1969 (in Caracas) D.Italia 1:1 U.D.Canarias (Maravic)
- First Round: 13 March 1969 (in Cali) D.Italia 0:3 Deportivo Cali
- First Round: 16 March 1969 (in Santa Marta) D.Italia 0:3 Unión Magdalena
- Quarters: 27 March 1969 (in Caracas) D.Italia 0:0 Cerro Porteño
- Quarters: 31 March 1969 (in Asunción) D.Italia 0:1 Cerro Porteño
- Quarters: 4 April 1969 (in Santiago) D.Italia 0:4 Universidad Católica
- Quarters: 15 April 1969 (in Caracas) D.Italia 3:2 Universidad Católica (Alvez, Adair 2 goals)

Copa Libertadores 1971 (as Venezuela runner-up)

- First Round: 31 January 1971 (in Caracas) D.Italia 3:3 D.Galicia (Beto, Militello 2 goals)
- First Round: 10 February 1971 (in Caracas) D.Italia 0:3 Palmeiras
- First Round: 17 February 1971 (in Caracas) D.Italia 0:6 Fluminense
- First Round: 25 February 1971 (in São Paulo) D.Italia 0:1 Palmeiras
- First Round: 3 March 1971 (in Rio de Janeiro) D.Italia 1:0 Fluminense (Tenorio)
- First Round: 14 March 1971 (in Caracas) D.Italia 3:2 D.Galicia (Alcyr, Negri, Useche)

Copa Libertadores 1972 (as Venezuela runner-up)

- First Round: 13 February 1972 (in Valencia) D.Italia 1:1 Valencia (Rui)
- First Round: 19 February 1972 (in Caracas) D.Italia 0:1 Peñarol
- First Round: 4 March 1972 (in Caracas) D.Italia 2:0 Valencia (M.Mateo, 2 goals)
- First Round: 12 March 1972 (in Montevideo) D.Italia 1:5 Peñarol (Alcyr)

Copa Libertadores 1985 (as Venezuela runner-up)

- First Round: 10 March 1985 (in San Cristóbal) D.Italia 0:0 D.Táchira
- First Round: 17 March 1985 (in Caracas) D.Italia 0:3 Blooming
- First Round: 21 March 1985 (in Caracas) D.Italia 0:3 Oriente Petrolero
- First Round: 24 March 1985 (in Caracas) D.Italia 1:3 D.Táchira (Zé Luis)
- First Round: 4 April 1985 (in Santa Cruz) D.It. 1:3 Oriente Petrolero (Carlos Alberto)
- First Round: 7 April 1985 (in Santa Cruz) D.Italia 0:8 Blooming

=== After the D'Ambrosio Golden Era ===
After the D'Ambrosio leadership the Deportivo Italia did not obtained the same level of results internationally. As "Deportivo Italchacao" it was eliminated in the preliminary matches of the Torneo Pre-Libertadores in 2000 and 2001, against Mexican teams (Atlante, CF America, Atlas, Cruz Azul) in Mexico City and Guadalajara

Only in the 2010 Copa Libertadores the Italo-venezuelan team (again with the original name "Deportivo Italia") was able to reach the preliminary stage of this CONMEBOL Copa. But the "Azules" were able only to tie (2:2) one match in Caracas with the Cruzeiro of Brazil, with goals of Blanco and McIntosh in the group 7 of the second stage.

Deportivo Italia was eliminated in April 2010 after the following matches:

| Team (Group 7) | Pld | W | D | L | GF | GA | GD | Pts |
|---|---|---|---|---|---|---|---|---|
| (Argentina) Vélez Sársfield | 6 | 4 | 1 | 1 | 10 | 5 | +5 | 13 |
| (Brazil) Cruzeiro | 6 | 3 | 2 | 1 | 12 | 6 | +6 | 11 |
| (Chile) Colo-Colo | 6 | 2 | 2 | 2 | 8 | 10 | −2 | 8 |
| (Venezuela) Deportivo Italia | 6 | 0 | 1 | 5 | 4 | 13 | −9 | 1 |

| | COL | CRU | ITA | VÉL |
|---|---|---|---|---|
| Colo-Colo | – | 1–1 | 1–0 | 1–1 |
| Cruzeiro | 4–1 | – | 2–0 | 3–0 |
| Deportivo Italia | 2–3 | 2–2 | – | 0–1 |
| Vélez Sársfield | 2–1 | 2–0 | 4–0 | – |
