= Adrián Álvarez =

Argentine footballer (born 1968)

Personal information
- Full name: Adrián Fabio Álvarez
- Date of birth: 5 March 1968 (age 58)
- Place of birth: San Martín, Argentina
- Height: 1.76 m (5 ft 9 in)
- Position: Midfielder

Team information
- Current team: Crucero del Norte (manager)

Senior career*
Years	Team	Apps	(Gls)
1986–1992	Sportivo Italiano		
1993	Gimnasia de La Plata		
1993–1994	Colón		
1994–1995	Deportivo Morón		
1995–1996	Huracán de Corrientes		
1996–1997	Belgrano		
1997–1998	Arsenal Sarandí		
1998–1999	Banfield		
1999	Independiente Rivadavia		
2000	Temperley		
2001	The Strongest		
2002	Monagas		
2003	Deportivo Táchira		
2003–2004	Mineros de Guayana		
2004	Boca Unidos		
2005	Sportivo Patria		
2005	Atlético San Miguel		

Managerial career
- 2022: Crucero del Norte
- 2025–: Crucero del Norte
- * Club domestic league appearances and goals

Adrián Álvarez (born 5 March 1968) is an Argentine football manager and former who manages Crucero del Norte. He played as a midfielder.
