= David McIntosh (Venezuelan footballer) =

Venezuelan footballer (born 1973)

Personal information
- Full name: David Andrew McIntosh Parra
- Date of birth: 17 February 1973 (age 53)
- Place of birth: Ciudad Bolívar, Venezuela
- Height: 1.78 m (5 ft 10 in)
- Position: Centre back

Senior career*
Years	Team	Apps	(Gls)
1996–1997	Minervén	14	(1)
1997–1998	Zulia	31	(0)
1998–2004	Caracas	29	(2)
2000–2001	→ Trujillanos (loan)	34	(5)
2004–2005	Carabobo	17	(0)
2005–2008	Aragua	33	(3)
2008–2009	Minervén	24	(1)
2009–2010	Deportivo Italia		
2010–2011	Deportivo Petare	60	(8)
2011–2012	Deportivo Lara	34	(2)
2013–2014	Atlético Venezuela	44	(0)
2014–2015	Metropolitanos	47	(1)
2016	Atlético Venezuela	10	(0)
2017	Angostura FC		
2018–2019	Deportivo Anzoátegui	37	(3)
2019	Yaracuy FC		

International career
1996–1999	Venezuela	26	(0)
- * Club domestic league appearances and goals as of 21:45, 13 November 2019 (UTC)

David Andrew McIntosh Parra (Spanish pronunciation: [daˈβið maˈkintoʃ ˈpara]; born 17 February 1973) is a retired Venezuelan footballer who played as a centre back. McIntosh also has been capped for the Venezuela national team in two Copa América editions by Eduardo Borrero and José Omar Pastoriza as coach.

In October 2019, 41-year old McIntosh announced his retirement.

== Honours ==
=== Club ===
ACD Lara

- Torneo de Clausura (1): 2012
