= Carlos Cárdenas =

Bolivian footballer (born 1976)

Personal information
- Full name: Carlos Cárdenas Rodriguez
- Date of birth: October 5, 1976 (age 50)
- Place of birth: Cobija, Bolivia
- Height: 1.78 m (5 ft 10 in)
- Position: Striker

Senior career*
Years	Team	Apps	(Gls)
1997	Chaco Petrolero	26	(10)
1998–2004	Wilstermann	227	(86)
2005	Blooming	16	(3)
2006	Aurora	15	(7)
2007	Universitario	12	(3)

International career
1999–2001	Bolivia	5	(0)
- * Club domestic league appearances and goals as of May 18, 2008

Carlos Cárdenas Rodriguez (born October 5, 1976, in Cobija, Pando) is a Bolivian retired football striker.

== Club career ==
During his professional career he played for Wilstermann, Blooming, Aurora and Universitario.

== International career ==
Nicknamed El Pollo (The Chicken), Cárdenas capped for the Bolivia national team 5 times between 1999 and 2001.
