= Marcelo Ceballos =

Argentine footballer

Personal information
- Full name: Marcelo Alejandro Ceballos
- Date of birth: 19 January 1972 (age 54)
- Place of birth: Berazategui, Argentina
- Position: Forward

Senior career*
Years	Team	Apps	(Gls)
1991–1992	Berazategui		
1993–1994	Villa San Carlos		
1994–1995	Ciclón		
1996	Guabirá		
1996–1997	Barracas Central		
1998–2000	Guabirá		
2001	The Strongest		
2002	Blooming		
2003	San José		
2003	Carabobo		
2004	Unión Central		
2004	Libertad de Sunchales		
2005–2006	Talleres de Perico		
2006–2007	Gimnasia de Mendoza		
- * Club domestic league appearances and goals

Marcelo Ceballos (born 19 January 1972) is a retired Argentine football striker.
