= Juan José Morales =

Argentine footballer

Personal information
- Full name: Juan José Morales
- Date of birth: 13 May 1982 (age 44)
- Place of birth: Bella Vista, Tucumán, Argentina
- Height: 1.84 m (6 ft 0 in)
- Position: Forward

Senior career*
Years	Team	Apps	(Gls)
2000–2007	San Martín Tucumán	103	(25)
2002–2003	→ Central Norte (loan)	0	(0)
2004	→ Atlético Concepción (loan)	8	(6)
2008	Colón	5	(0)
2008–2011	Quilmes	63	(21)
2009–2010	→ Universidad Católica (loan)	32	(12)
2011–2012	Argentinos Juniors	25	(5)
2012	Atlético Venezuela	10	(3)
2013	Paraná	35	(8)
2014	Huachipato	9	(2)
2014	Mineros de Guayana	15	(7)
2015	All Boys	22	(5)
2016	Terengganu	7	(1)
2017–2018	San Jorge Tucumán	21	(3)
2019	Deportivo Rincón	10	(4)
2020	Juventud Unida Trancas	5	(1)
Total		370	(103)
- * Club domestic league appearances and goals

Juan José Morales (born May 13, 1982) is an Argentine former professional footballer who played as a forward.

== Career ==
Morales was born in Bella Vista, Tucumán, Argentina. A native of Tucumán province, he (also known as Jota Jota) began his football career with local side San Martín de Tucumán. He went on loan to Central Norte and Atlético Concepción, and helped San Martín win promotion from the Torneo Argentino C and Primera B Nacional.

Morales left San Martín in 2007, but did not settle in the Argentine Primera División with Club Atlético Colón. Although Morales struggled at Colón, he would later enjoy success against the club, first with Universidad Católica (Copa Libertadores) and then with Quilmes (Primera División). The next season he joined Quilmes Atlético Club, where he would lead the club with 16 goals in the 2008–09 Primera B Nacional. Spells with Club Deportivo Universidad Católica and Argentinos Juniors followed. Morales would spend the rest of his career as a journeyman, with spells abroad in Venezuela, Brazil, Chile and Malaysia. Throughout his career, Morales scored 68 league goals in Argentina's top four divisions.

In late 2014, Morales made the decision to cancel his contract with Venezuelan side A.C.C.D. Mineros de Guayana and join his partner, Flaviana Seeling (a member of the Brazilian music group Axé Bahia) on the Chilean reality television competition Amor a prueba.
