= Fábio Oliveira (footballer, born 1974) =

Brazilian footballer

Personal information
- Full name: Fábio Marcelo De Oliveira
- Date of birth: 6 July 1974 (age 52)
- Place of birth: Rio de Janeiro, Brazil
- Height: 1.82 m (6 ft 0 in)
- Position: Forward

Senior career*
Years	Team	Apps	(Gls)
1999–2000	Mariscal Braun	?	(21)
2001	Xiamen	?	(12)
2002	The Strongest		
2003	Xiamen	?	(7)
2004	Paraná		
2004	Criciúma	17	(1)
2005–2006	Avaí	?	(12)
2006	Gama	?	(6)
2007	Atlético Goianiense	0	(0)
2007	Remo	?	(22)
2008	Fortaleza	?	(3)
2008	Paysandu	?	(?)
2009	Madureira	0	(0)
2009	Joinville	0	(0)
2009	Gama	?	(?)
2011	Morrinhos		
2011	Veranópolis		
2011	Rio Verde		
- * Club domestic league appearances and goals

Fábio Marcelo de Oliveira (born 6 July 1974) is a Brazilian footballer.

== Career ==
In June 2003 he was re-signed by Xiamen.

=== Return to Brazil ===
2004

In 2004, he played for Criciúma at Campeonato Brasileiro.

2007

In June 2007 he signed for Remo. He also played for Atlético Goianiense at Copa do Brasil 2007 and Campeonato Goiano.

2008

In 2008, he signed for Fortaleza at Campeonato Brasileiro Série B. In September 2008 he signed for Paysandu at Campeonato Brasileiro Série C.

2009

In November 2008 he was signed by Madureira. In March 2009 he signed for Joinville.

In June 2009, he signed a contract until September for Gama of Campeonato Brasileiro Série C. but later released due to Gama did not enter the second stage of the league.

== Honours ==
- Campeonato Goiano: 2007
