= Rodolfo Gamarra =

Paraguayan footballer (born 1988)

Personal information
- Full name: Rodolfo Vicente Gamarra Varela
- Date of birth: 10 December 1988 (age 37)
- Place of birth: Asunción, Paraguay
- Height: 1.68 m (5 ft 6 in)
- Position: Winger

Youth career
- –2004: Sportivo Limpeño
- 2004–2008: Libertad

Senior career*
Years	Team	Apps	(Gls)
2008–2016	Libertad	124	(27)
2014	→ Cerro Porteño (loan)	25	(6)
2017–2019	Guaraní	72	(13)
2019	CSA	2	(0)
2020	Cobresal	9	(0)
2021	Sportivo Luqueño	15	(1)
2024	Rubio Ñu	0	(0)

International career
2005	Paraguay U17	5	(1)
2009–2010	Paraguay	3	(0)
- * Club domestic league appearances and goals as of 17:35, 6 July 2020 (UTC)

Rodolfo Vicente Gamarra Varela (born 10 December 1988) is a Paraguayan professional footballer who plays as a winger.

== Career ==
=== Club ===
Gamarra played his first professional game with Libertad in the Paraguayan Primera División on 18 November 2008, on a 1–1 draw against Tacuary. On 20 May 2009 he scored his two first professional goals in the 4–1 victory over 12 de Octubre.

=== CSA ===
On 15 June 2019 CSA signed Gamarra from Guaraní.

== International career ==
Gamarra won with the Paraguayan U-16 team the 2004 U-16 South American Championship. He played his first game for the senior national team in 2009, in an unofficial friendly against Chile. He was called by coach Gerardo Martino for the final Paraguayan squad to play at the 2010 FIFA World Cup, with only 2 official international games played to that date.
