= Óscar Ruiz (referee) =

Colombian football referee (born 1969)

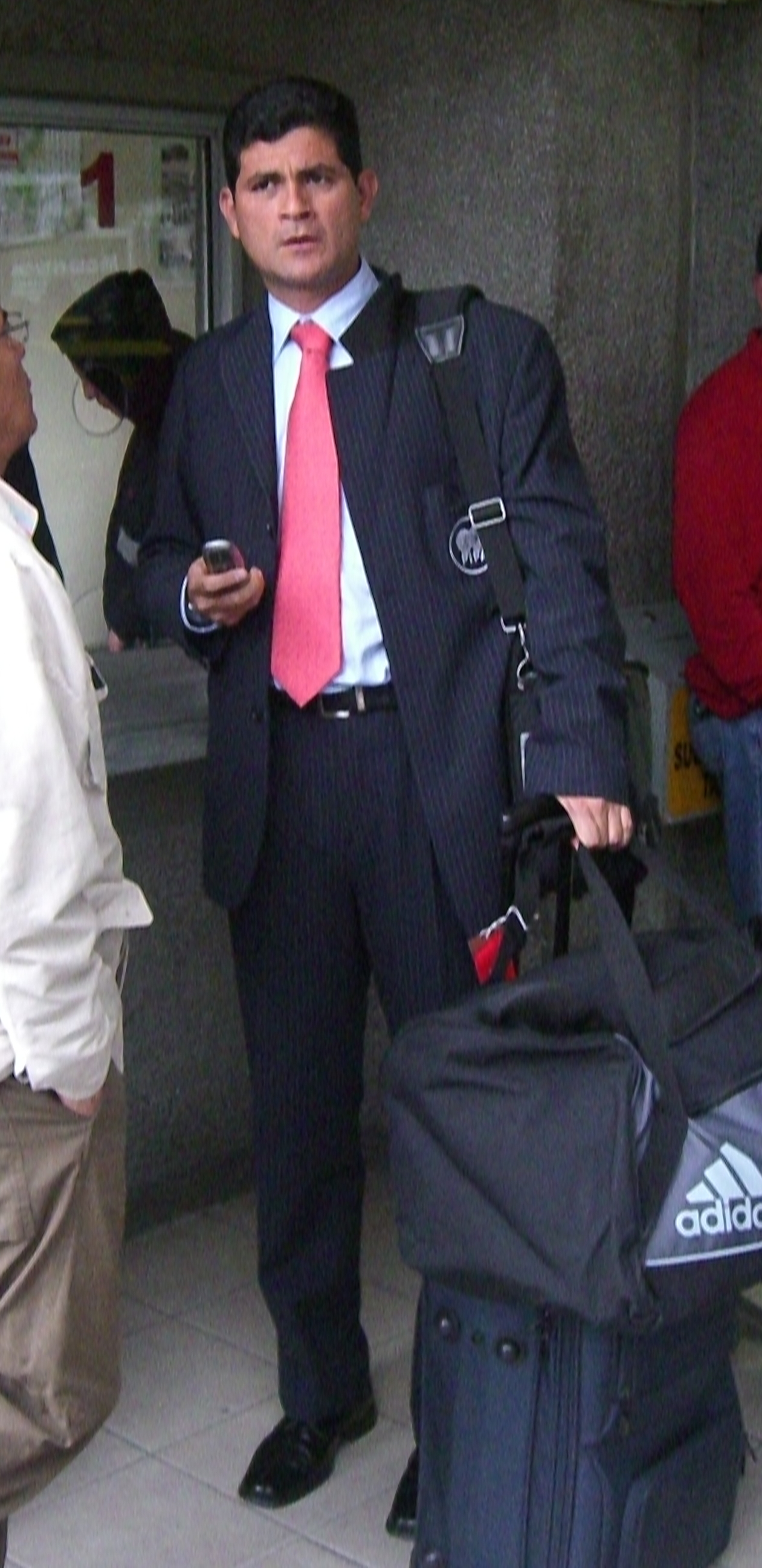
- Full name: Óscar Julián Ruiz Acosta
- Born: 1 November 1969 (age 56); Villavicencio, Colombia
- Other occupation: Lawyer

International
Years	League	Role
1995–2011	FIFA listed	Referee

Óscar Julián Ruiz Acosta (born 1 November 1969 in Villavicencio) is a former Colombian football referee and current referee instructor. He is also a lawyer.

== Career ==
He had been a referee since 1 January 1995, and his international debut was on 12 July 1995 (Paraguay vs. Venezuela). He officiated in the 2002, 2006 and 2010 FIFA World Cups.

He was preselected as a referee for the 2010 FIFA World Cup and sent off Yoann Gourcuff in the France vs. South Africa match.

FIFA appointed Ruiz as a referee instructor and member of CONMEBOL's referee assistance program.
