= 2009 Copa Libertadores finals =

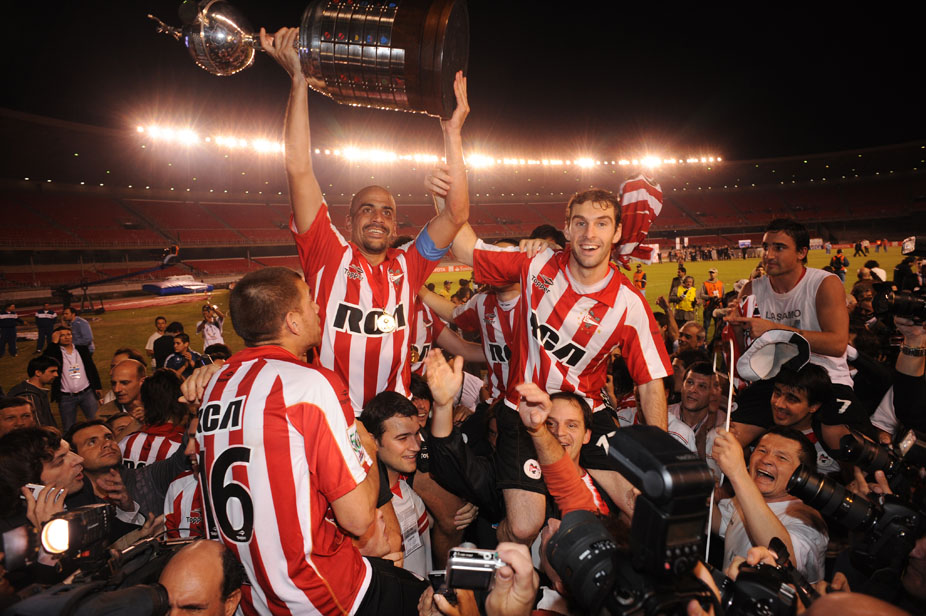
- Players of Estudiantes celebrating the victory
- Event: 2009 Copa Libertadores
Estudiantes LP	Cruzeiro
(Argentina)	(Brazil)
2	1
- on points

First leg
Estudiantes LP	Cruzeiro
0	0
- Date: 8 July 2009
- Venue: Estadio Único, La Plata
- Man of the Match: Fábio
- Referee: Jorge Larrionda (Uruguay)

Second leg
Cruzeiro	Estudiantes LP
1	2
- Date: 15 July 2009
- Venue: Mineirão, Belo Horizonte
- Man of the Match: Juan Sebastián Verón
- Referee: Carlos Chandía (Chile)

The 2009 Copa Libertadores finals was the final two-legged tie to determine the 2009 Copa Libertadores champion. It was contested by Argentine club Estudiantes de La Plata and Brazilian club Cruzeiro. The first leg of the tie was played on 8 July at Estudiantes' home field, with the second leg played on 15 July at Cruzeiro's.

Cruzeiro and Estudiantes played in their 4th and 5th Copa Libertadores finals, respectively. Cruzeiro last appearance was in 1997, in which they beat Sporting Cristal for their second title. Estudiantes returned after a 39-year absence. Their last finals appearance was in 1971, in which they lost to Uruguayan club Nacional.

Estudiantes de La Plata won the tie 4 points to 1 to earn their fourth Copa Libertadores title.

== Qualified teams ==
Team	Previous finals app.
(Argentina) Estudiantes LP	**1968**, **1969**, **1970**, 1971
(Brazil) Cruzeiro	**1976**, 1977, **1997**

Bold indicates winning years

== Rules ==
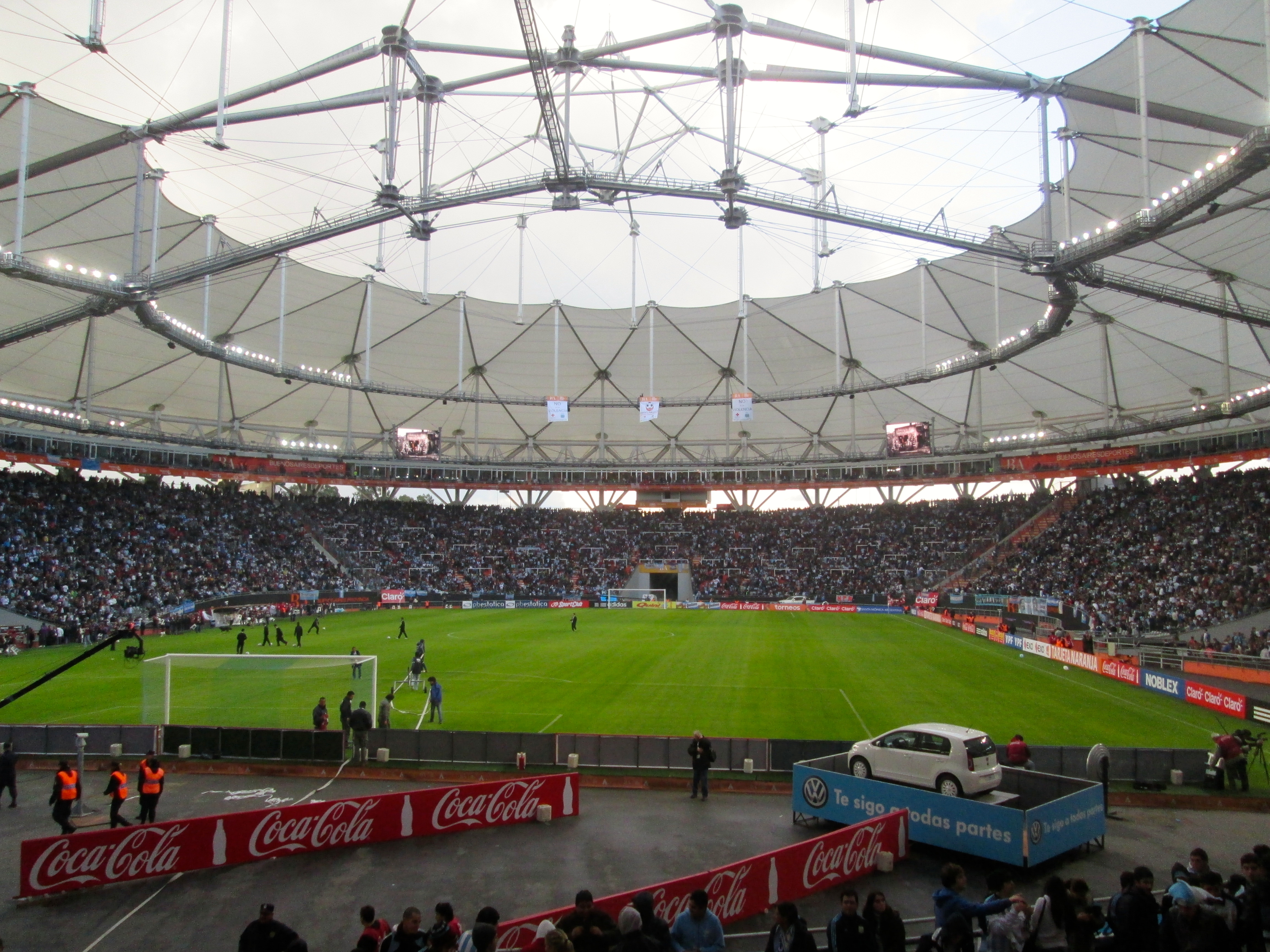
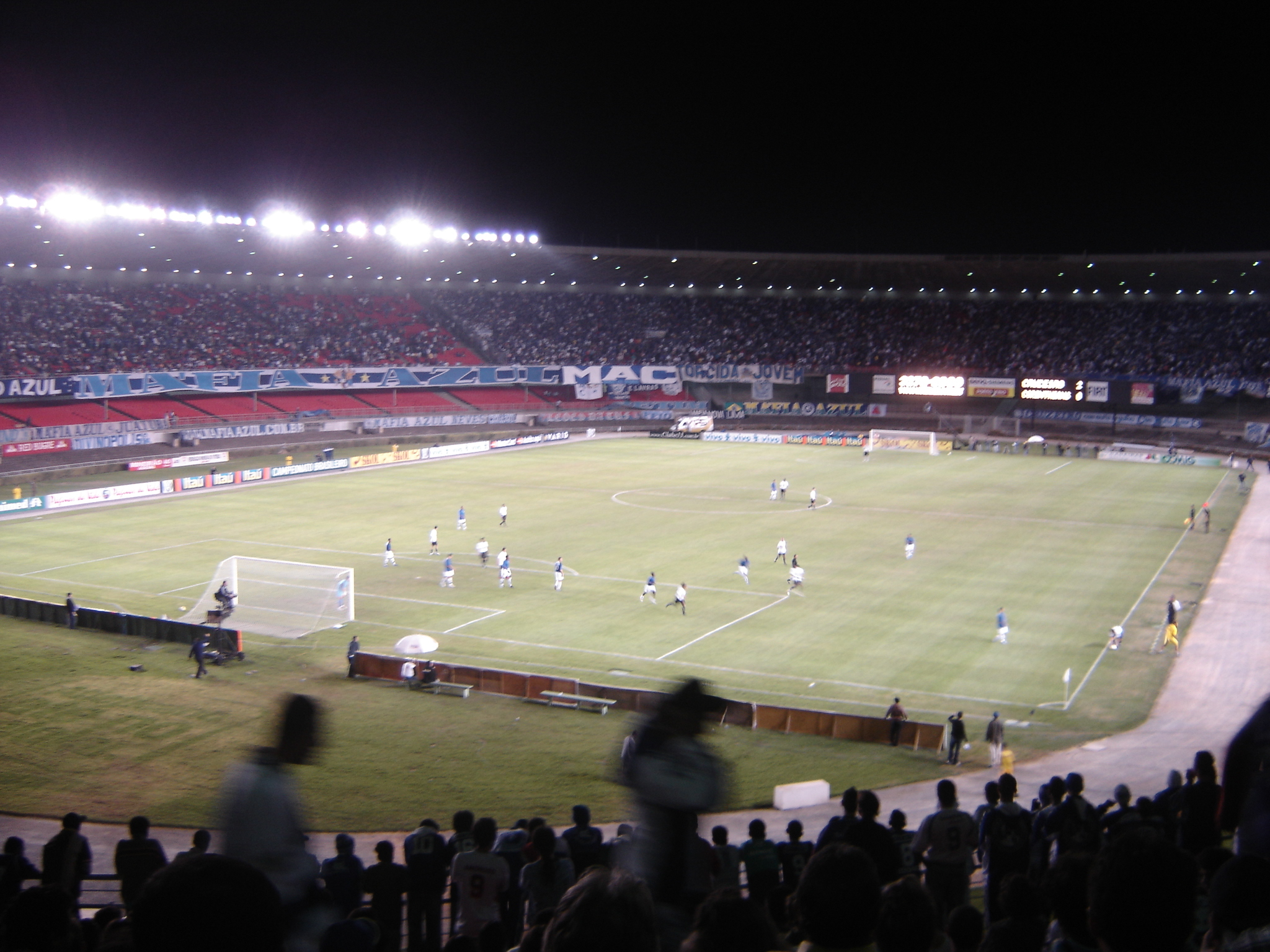
Estadio Ciudad de La Plata (left) and Mineirão, venues for the series

The final will be played over two legs, each at a finalists home venue. The higher seeded team will play the second leg at home. The team that accumulates the most points —three for a win, one for a draw, zero for a loss— after the two legs will be crowned the champion. Unlike the previous rounds, the away-goals rule will not be used. Should the two teams be tied on points after the second leg, the team with the best goal difference will win. If the two teams have equal goal difference, extra time will be used. The extra time will consist of two 15-minute halves. If the tie is still not broken, a penalty shoot-out, consisting of a maximum of five penalties per team, will ensue according to the Laws of the Game (although it is possible to win the penalty shootout before the fifth penalty kick is taken). If there is no clear winner after the 10 penalty kicks, then a sudden-death penalty shootout will ensue.

== Route to the finals ==
Cruzeiro qualified to the 2009 Copa Libertadores as the 3rd place team in the 2008 Série A. This gave them the Brazil 3 spot and a direct qualification into the Second Stage. Estudiantes qualified into the Argentina 5 spot by having the 2nd best average of the 2007 Apertura, 2008 Clausura, & 2008 Apertura tournaments. The spot qualified them into the First Stage.

=== Estudiantes in the First Stage ===
Estudiantes started this year's Copa Libertadores run in the First Stage in a two-legged tie against Peruvian club Sporting Cristal for a spot in Group 5. Sporting Cristial took the first leg, played in Lima, 2−1. Enzo Pérez scored the lone goal for Estudiantes. In the second leg, Estudiantes' Ramón Lentini scored the lone goal of the match, assuring that Estudiantes advanced to the Second Stage on the away goals tie-breaker.

=== Group 5 of the Second Stage ===
Final Group 5 standings
Team	Pld	W	D	L	GF	GA	GD	Pts
(Brazil) Cruzeiro	6	4	1	1	9	5	+4	**13**
(Argentina) Estudiantes	6	3	1	2	9	4	+5	**10**
(Ecuador) Deportivo Quito	6	2	2	2	6	9	−3	**8**
(Bolivia) Universitario de Sucre	6	0	2	4	2	8	−6	**2**

Cruzeiro was drawn into Group 5, with Estudiantes advancing into it. They were joined by the defending Ecuadorian champion, Deportivo Quito, and the Bolivian 2008 Apertura champion, Universitario de Sucre. Their first group match was against each other in Belo Horizonte. Cruzeiro won 3−0 with goals by Fernandinho and Kléber (two). The next group match between the both of them was their respective fifth group-play match. Playing in La Plata, Estudiantes won 4−0 with goals by Juan Sebastián Verón, Gastón Fernández, and Cristian Sánchez Prette (two).

Cruzeiro second group match was on the road against Deportivo Quito. Ramires scored for Cruzeiro before Giovanny Caicedo tied it for Deportivo Quito. They stayed on the road (to Sucre) to play Universitario. Thiago Ribeiro scored the lone goal of the match to get the win. The next two game Cruzeiro played were at home. Universitario visited first and lost the match thanks to two goals by Wellington Paulista. In Cruzeiro's last match of group play, they played host to Deportivo Quito, whom they beat 2−0 with goals by Léo Fortunato and Wagner.

Estudiantes continued group play by hosting Universitario. Juan Manuel Salgueiro scored the only goal for Estudiantes, and subsequently the win. They then went to Quito to play Deportivo Quito. Estudiantes lost the match 1−0. Deportivo Quito then visited Estudiantes for their next match. Estudiantes soundly won the match 4−0 thanks to a goal by Enzo Pérez and a hat-trick by Mauro Boselli. Estudiantes' last match of group play ended in a scoreless tie against Universitario.

Cruzeiro and Estudiantes finished 1 & 2, respectively, which advanced them to the Round of 16.

=== Cruzeiro in the knockout stages ===
Cruzeiro was seeded 5 for the last stages of the tournament. In the round of 16, they played against Chilean club Universidad de Chile (seeded 12). The first leg was played in Santiago. Cruzeiro won the match 1−2 with goals by Soares and Marquinhos Paraná. second leg, played at home, was won by a lone goal from Kléber. Cruzeiro advanced on points 6−0.

Cruzeiro's quarterfinal match-up was against fellow Brazilian side São Paulo (seeded 4). The first leg, played at home, was won 2−1 with goals by Leonardo Silva and Zé Carlos. The second leg, played in São Paulo, was also won 0−2 with goals by Henrique and Kléber. Cruzeiro advanced on points 6−0.

Cruzeiro's semifinal match-up was against another Brazilian side, top-seeded Grêmio. Cruzeiro won the first leg 3−1 thanks to goals by Wellington Paulista, Wágner, and Fabinho. The second leg, played in Porto Alegre, ended in a 2−2 tie. Wellington Paulista scored twice for Cruzeiro in as many minutes, but Grêmio came back and tied it in the second half. Cruzeiro advanced 4−1 on points.

As of the finals, Cruzeiro is the most effective team in the tournament, with an efficacy rating of 80.56% (9 wins, 2 draws, 1 loss).

=== Estudiantes in the knockout stages ===
Estudiantes was seeded 10 for the last stages of the tournament. Estudiantes' round of 16 match-up was against Paraguayan club Libertad. Seeded 7, Libertad was the first team to advance to the round of 16. Estudiantes won the first match 3−0 with goals by Gastón Fernández (with the fastest goal of the tournament) and Mauro Boselli (2). A 0−0 tie was enough in the second leg to advance Estudiantes 4−1 on points.

The quarterfinals match-up was against Uruguayan club Defensor Sporting (seeded 15). Estudiantes won both legs 1−0 with goals by Leandro Desábato (first leg) and Leandro Benítez (second leg). Estudiantes advanced 6−0 on points.

In the semifinals, Estudiantes met another Uruguayan club, 3 seeded Nacional. In the first leg, played at home, Estudiantes won with a lone goal by Diego Galván. In the second leg, Estudiantes won 1−2 with a pair of goals by Mauro Boselli. Estudiantes advanced 6−0 on points.

As of the finals, Estudiantes has an efficacy rating of 69.05% (9 wins, 2 draws, 3 loss). Striker Mauro Boselli is currently tied as the top-scorer of the tournament, with 7 goals.

=== Knockout stages summary ===
Cruzeiro			Estudiantes	
Universidad de Chile; A **2–1**	Soares 8'; Marquinhos Paraná 52'	**Round of 16**; First leg	(Paraguay) Libertad; H **3–0**	Fernández 1'; Boselli 64' (pen.), 70'
Universidad de Chile; H **1–0**	Kléber 74'	Second leg	(Paraguay) Libertad; A **0–0**	
(Brazil) São Paulo; H **2–1**	Leonardo Silva 45'; Zé Carlos 66'	**Quarterfinals**; First leg	(Uruguay) Defensor Sporting; A **1–0**	Desábato 12'
(Brazil) São Paulo; A **2–0**	Henrique 65'; Kléber 81' (pen.)	Second leg	(Uruguay) Defensor Sporting; H **1–0**	Benítez 13'
(Brazil) Grêmio; H **3–1**	Wellington Paulista 38'; Wagner 47'; Fabinho 67'	**Semifinals**; First leg	(Uruguay) Nacional; H **1–0**	Galván 14'
(Brazil) Grêmio; A **2–2**	Wellington Paulista 34', 36'	Second leg	(Uruguay) Nacional; A **2–1**	Boselli 52', 90+1'

== Match details ==
=== First leg ===
2009 Copa Libertadores finals
8 July 2009
21:50 (UTC-3)
First leg

Estudiantes LP (Argentina)	0–0	(Brazil) Cruzeiro
	Report

Estadio Único, La Plata
Attendance: 52,000
Referee: Jorge Larrionda (Uruguay)

**Estudiantes LP**	**Cruzeiro**

GK	21	(Argentina) Mariano Andújar
RB	3	(Argentina) Christian Cellay
DF	14	(Argentina) Rolando Schiavi	(yellow card) 26'
DF	2	(Argentina) Leandro Desábato	(yellow card) 66'
LB	16	(Argentina) Germán Ré
MF	22	(Argentina) Rodrigo Braña
MF	8	(Argentina) Enzo Pérez
MF	11	(Argentina) Juan Sebastián Verón (c)
MF	23	(Argentina) Leandro Benítez	(yellow card) 14'	(substituted off) 75'
FW	17	(Argentina) Mauro Boselli
FW	10	(Argentina) Gastón Fernández		(substituted off) 82'
Substitutes:
GK	25	(Argentina) Damián Albil
DF	13	(Uruguay) Juan Díaz
DF	6	(Argentina) Federico Fernández
MF	5	(Argentina) Cristian Sánchez Prette
MF	18	(Argentina) Maximiliano Núñez		(substituted on) 75'
FW	9	(Argentina) José Calderón
FW	7	(Uruguay) Juan Salgueiro		(substituted on) 82'
Manager:
(Argentina) Alejandro Sabella

GK	1	(Brazil) Fábio (c)
RB	2	(Brazil) Jonathan
DF	22	(Brazil) Leonardo Silva
DF	3	(Brazil) Anderson
LB	20	(Brazil) Gérson Magrão	(yellow card) 64'	(substituted off) 86'
DM	7	(Brazil) Marquinhos Paraná
DM	15	(Brazil) Henrique
AM	8	(Brazil) Ramires
AM	10	(Brazil) Wágner	(yellow card) 39'
FW	9	(Brazil) Wellington Paulista	(yellow card) 84'
FW	25	(Brazil) Kléber	(yellow card) 41'
Substitutes:
GK	12	(Brazil) Andrey
DF	14	(Brazil) Jancarlos
MF	21	(Brazil) Fabinho		(substituted on) 86'
MF	17	(Brazil) Elicarlos
MF	16	(Brazil) Bernardo
FW	11	(Brazil) Thiago Ribeiro
FW	18	(Brazil) Zé Carlos
Manager:
(Brazil) Adílson Batista

Man of the Match:
(Brazil) Fábio

Assistant referees:
(Uruguay) Pablo Fandiño
(Uruguay) Mauricio Espinosa
Fourth official:
(Uruguay) Martín Vázquez

=== Second leg ===
15 July 2009
21:50 (UTC-3)
Second leg

Cruzeiro (Brazil)	1–2	(Argentina) Estudiantes LP
Henrique 52'	Report	Fernández 57'; Boselli 72'

Mineirão, Belo Horizonte
Attendance: 65,000
Referee: Carlos Chandía (Chile)

**Cruzeiro**	**Estudiantes LP**

GK	1	(Brazil) Fábio (c)
RB	2	(Brazil) Jonathan
DF	22	(Brazil) Leonardo Silva
DF	4	(Brazil) Thiago Heleno
LB	20	(Brazil) Gérson Magrão
CM	7	(Brazil) Marquinhos Paraná
CM	15	(Brazil) Henrique
PM	8	(Brazil) Ramires
AM	10	(Brazil) Wágner		(substituted off) 71'
FW	9	(Brazil) Wellington Paulista		(substituted off) 74'
FW	25	(Brazil) Kléber	(yellow card) 37'
Substitutes:
GK	12	(Brazil) Andrey
LB	18	(Brazil) Athirson		(substituted on) 71'
MF	5	(Brazil) Fabrício
MF	21	(Brazil) Fabinho
MF	17	(Brazil) Elicarlos
MF	16	(Brazil) Bernardo
FW	11	(Brazil) Thiago Ribeiro		(substituted on) 74'
Manager:
(Brazil) Adílson Batista

GK	21	(Argentina) Mariano Andújar
RB	3	(Argentina) Christian Cellay
DF	14	(Argentina) Rolando Schiavi
DF	2	(Argentina) Leandro Desábato
LB	16	(Argentina) Germán Ré
MF	22	(Argentina) Rodrigo Braña	(yellow card) 44'	(substituted off) 86'
MF	8	(Argentina) Enzo Pérez
MF	11	(Argentina) Juan Sebastián Verón (c)	(yellow card) 37'
MF	23	(Argentina) Leandro Benítez		(substituted off) 79'
FW	17	(Argentina) Mauro Boselli
FW	10	(Argentina) Gastón Fernández		(substituted off) 90'
Substitutes:
GK	25	(Argentina) Damián Albil
DF	13	(Uruguay) Juan Díaz		(substituted on) 79'
DF	6	(Argentina) Federico Fernández
MF	5	(Argentina) Cristian Sánchez Prette		(substituted on) 86'
MF	18	(Argentina) Maximiliano Núñez
FW	9	(Argentina) José Luis Calderón		(substituted on) 90'
FW	7	(Uruguay) Juan Salgueiro
Manager:
(Argentina) Alejandro Sabella

Man of the Match:
(Argentina) Juan Sebastián Verón

Assistant referees:

(Chile) Patricio Basualto
(Chile) Francisco Mondría
Fourth official:
(Chile) Pablo Pozo
