= 2008 Copa Sudamericana finals =

- Event: 2008 Copa Sudamericana
Estudiantes (LP)	Internacional
(Argentina)	(Brazil)
1	2
- on aggregate

First leg
Estudiantes (LP)	Internacional
0	1
- Date: 26 November 2008
- Venue: Estadio Ciudad de La Plata, La Plata
- Referee: Carlos Amarilla

Second leg
Internacional	Estudiantes (LP)
1	1
- Date: 3 December 2008
- Venue: Estádio Beira-Rio, Porto Alegre
- Referee: Jorge Larrionda
- Attendance: 51,803

The 2008 Copa Sudamericana finals was a two-legged football match-up to determine the 2008 Copa Sudamericana champion. The final was contested by Brazilian club Internacional and Argentine team Estudiantes de La Plata. The first leg, held in Estadio Ciudad de La Plata, was won by Internacional 1–0. As the second leg, held in Estádio Beira-Rio in Porto Alegre ended in a 1–1 tie, Internacional became champions of the competition winning 4–1 on points (2–1 on aggregate).

== Qualified teams ==
Team	Previous finals app.
(Argentina) Estudiantes LP	None
(Brazil) Internacional	None

== Venues ==
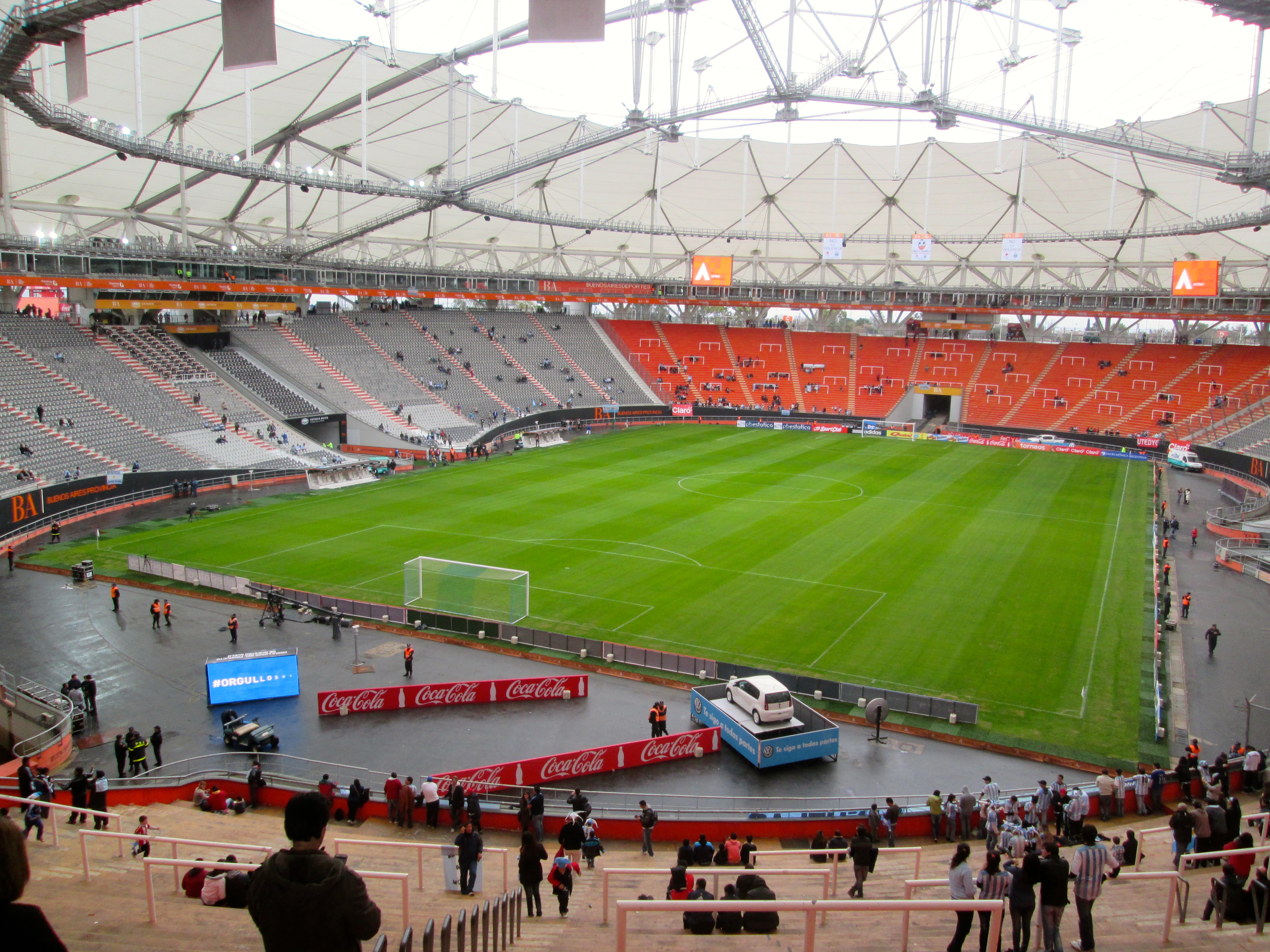
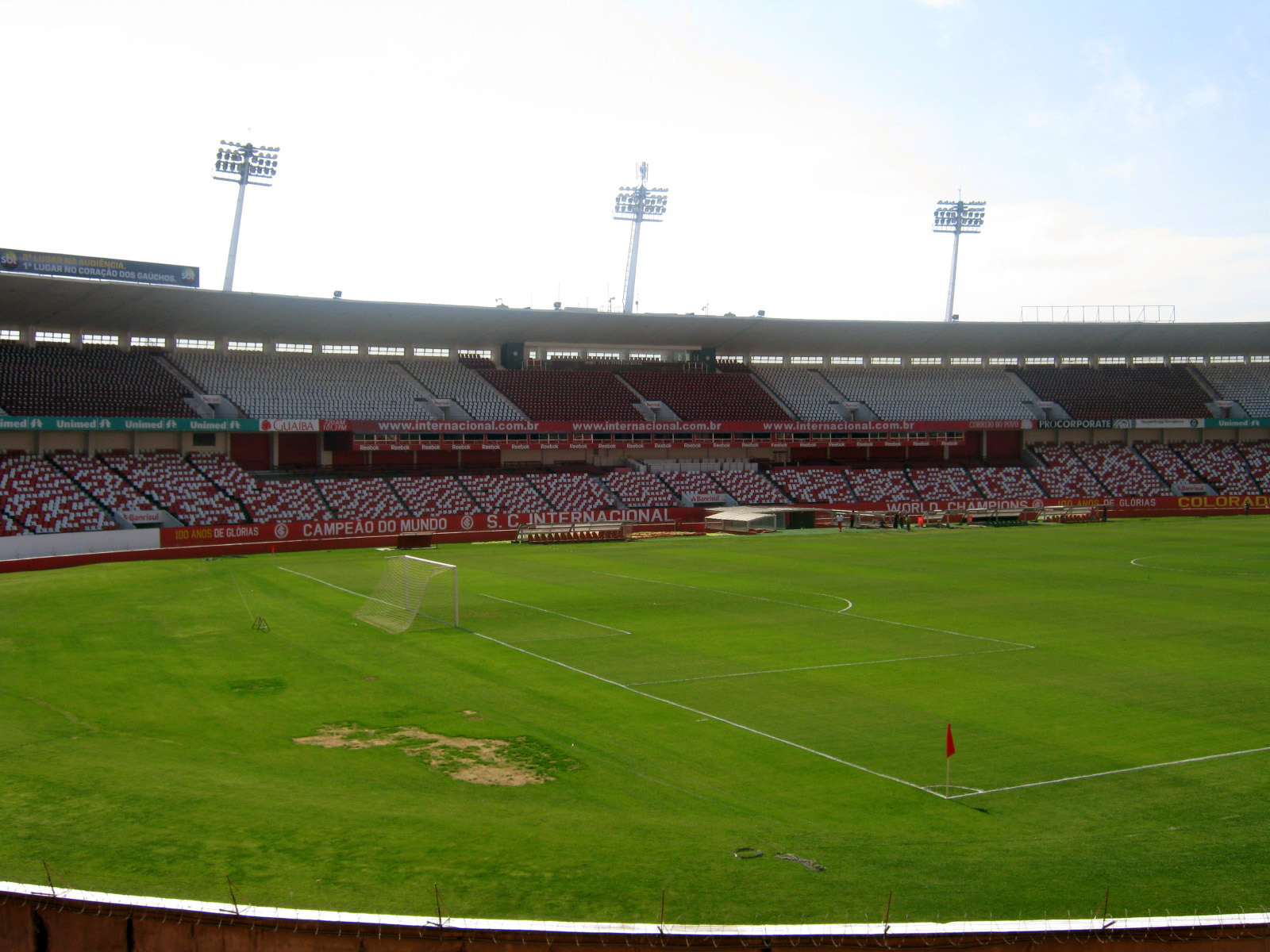
Estadio Ciudad de La Plata (left) and Estádio Beira-Rio, venues for the series

== Match summary ==
=== First leg ===
2008 Copa Sudamericana finals
26 November 2008
22:00 (UTC-3)
First leg

Estudiantes LP (Argentina)	0–1	(Brazil) Internacional
	Report	Alex 34' (pen.)

Estadio Ciudad de La Plata, La Plata
Referee: Carlos Amarilla (Paraguay)

Estudiantes (LP)	Internacional

GK	21	(Argentina) Mariano Andújar
DF	14	(Argentina) Marcos Angeleri	(yellow card) 45'
DF	6	(Argentina) Agustín Alayes		(substituted off) 69'
DF	2	(Argentina) Leandro Desabato	(yellow card) 32'
DF	13	(Uruguay) Juan Manuel Díaz
MF	20	(Argentina) Diego Alberto Galván		(substituted off) 62'
MF	5	(Argentina) Matías Sánchez
MF	11	(Argentina) Juan Sebastián Verón (c)
MF	23	(Argentina) Leandro Benítez
FW	7	(Uruguay) Juan Manuel Salgueiro	(yellow card) 13'	(substituted off) 59'
FW	17	(Argentina) Mauro Boselli
Substitutes:
GK	1	(Argentina) Mariano Barbosa
FW	10	(Argentina) Gastón Fernández		(substituted on) 59'
FW	9	(Argentina) José Luis Calderón		(substituted on) 69'
DF	3	(Argentina) Christian Cellay
MF	15	(Argentina) Juan Huerta
MF	16	(Argentina) Iván Moreno y Fabianesi		(substituted on) 62'
MF	19	(Argentina) Raúl Iberbia
Manager:
(Argentina) Leonardo Astrada

GK	22	(Brazil) Lauro	(yellow card) 69'
DF	13	(Brazil) Bolívar
DF	3	(Brazil) Índio	(yellow card) 23'
DF	24	(Brazil) Álvaro
DF	6	(Brazil) Marcão
MF	8	(Brazil) Edinho (c)
MF	11	(Brazil) Magrão	(yellow card) 46'
MF	5	(Argentina) Pablo Guiñazú	(red card) 24'
MF	15	(Argentina) Andrés D'Alessandro		(substituted off) 89'
MF	10	(Brazil) Alex		(substituted off) 70'
FW	9	(Brazil) Nilmar	(yellow card) 91'	(substituted off) 92'
Substitutes:
GK	12	(Brazil) Clemer
MF	4	(Brazil) Sandro		(substituted on) 89'
MF	7	(Brazil) Daniel Carvalho
DF	14	(Brazil) Danny Morais		(substituted on) 92'
DF	16	(Brazil) Gustavo Nery		(substituted on) 70'
MF	17	(Brazil) Andrezinho
FW	20	(Brazil) Taison
Manager:
(Brazil) Tite

Assistant referees:
(Paraguay) Manuel Bernal
(Paraguay) Emigdio Ruiz Roa
Fourth official:
(Paraguay) Carlos Galeano

=== Second leg ===
3 December 2008
22:00 (UTC-3)
First leg

Internacional (Brazil)	1–1 (a.e.t.)	(Argentina) Estudiantes LP
Nilmar 116'	Report	Alayes 65'

Estádio Beira-Rio, Porto Alegre
Attendance: 51,803
Referee: Jorge Larrionda (Uruguay)

Internacional	Estudiantes (LP)

GK	22	(Brazil) Lauro	(yellow card) 119'
DF	13	(Brazil) Bolívar	(yellow card) 65'
DF	14	(Brazil) Danny Morais
DF	24	(Brazil) Álvaro
DF	6	(Brazil) Marcão
MF	8	(Brazil) Edinho (c)
MF	11	(Brazil) Magrão	(yellow card) 22'	(substituted off) 107'
MF	17	(Brazil) Andrezinho		(substituted off) 62'
MF	15	(Argentina) Andrés D'Alessandro
MF	10	(Brazil) Alex		(substituted off) 79'
FW	9	(Brazil) Nilmar
Substitutes:
GK	1	(Brazil) Agenor	(red card) 92'
MF	4	(Brazil) Sandro		(substituted on) 107'
MF	7	(Brazil) Daniel Carvalho
DF	16	(Brazil) Gustavo Nery	(yellow card) 95'	(substituted on) 62'
MF	18	(Brazil) Rosinei
FW	20	(Brazil) Taison		(substituted on) 79'
DF	21	(Brazil) Ricardo Lopes
Manager:
(Brazil) Tite

GK	21	(Argentina) Mariano Andújar
DF	14	(Argentina) Marcos Angeleri
DF	6	(Argentina) Agustín Alayes	(yellow card) 14'
DF	2	(Argentina) Leandro Desábato
DF	3	(Argentina) Christian Cellay
MF	19	(Argentina) Raúl Iberbia		(substituted off) 63'
MF	22	(Argentina) Rodrigo Braña	(yellow card) 54' (yellow-red card) 118'
MF	11	(Argentina) Juan Sebastián Verón (c)		(substituted off) 97'
MF	23	(Argentina) Leandro Benítez	(yellow card) 53'
FW	10	(Argentina) Gastón Fernández		(substituted off) 70'
FW	17	(Argentina) Mauro Boselli	(red card) 118'
Substitutes:
GK	1	(Argentina) Mariano Barbosa
FW	7	(Uruguay) Juan M. Salgueiro
MF	8	(Argentina) Enzo Pérez		(substituted on) 63'
FW	9	(Argentina) José Luis Calderón		(substituted on) 70'
DF	13	(Uruguay) Juan Manuel Díaz
MF	15	(Argentina) Juan Huerta
MF	16	(Argentina) Iván Moreno y Fabianesi		(substituted on) 97'
Manager:
(Argentina) Leonardo Astrada

Assistant referees:
(Uruguay) Pablo Fadiño
(Uruguay) Wálter Rial
Fourth official:
(Uruguay) Roberto Silvera
