= 2009 FIFA Club World Cup final =

- Match programme cover
- Event: 2009 FIFA Club World Cup
Estudiantes (LP)	Barcelona
(Argentina)	(Spain)
1	2
- After extra time
- Date: 19 December 2009
- Venue: Zayed Sports City, Abu Dhabi
- Referee: Benito Archundia (Mexico)
- Attendance: 43,050
- Weather: Partly cloudy 22 °C (72 °F); 60% humidity

The 2009 FIFA Club World Cup final was the final match of the 2009 FIFA Club World Cup, a football tournament for the champion clubs from each of FIFA's six continental confederations. The match took place at the Sheikh Zayed Stadium, Abu Dhabi, on 19 December 2009, and pitted Estudiantes de La Plata of Argentina, the CONMEBOL club champions, against Barcelona of Spain, the UEFA club champions.

Estudiantes forward Mauro Boselli opened the scoring in the 37th minute, but Pedro equalised for Barcelona with one minute left in regulation time. Lionel Messi scored the winning goal in the fifth minute of the second half of extra time, securing Barcelona's record sixth trophy for the 2009 calendar year.

== Road to final ==
(Argentina) Estudiantes (LP)	Team	(Spain) Barcelona
CONMEBOL	Confederation	UEFA
Winner of the 2009 Copa Libertadores	Qualification	Winner of the 2008–09 UEFA Champions League
Bye	Play-off round	Bye
Bye	Quarter-finals	Bye
2–1 v. (South Korea) Pohang Steelers	Semi-finals	3–1 v. (Mexico) Atlante

== Match ==
=== Details ===
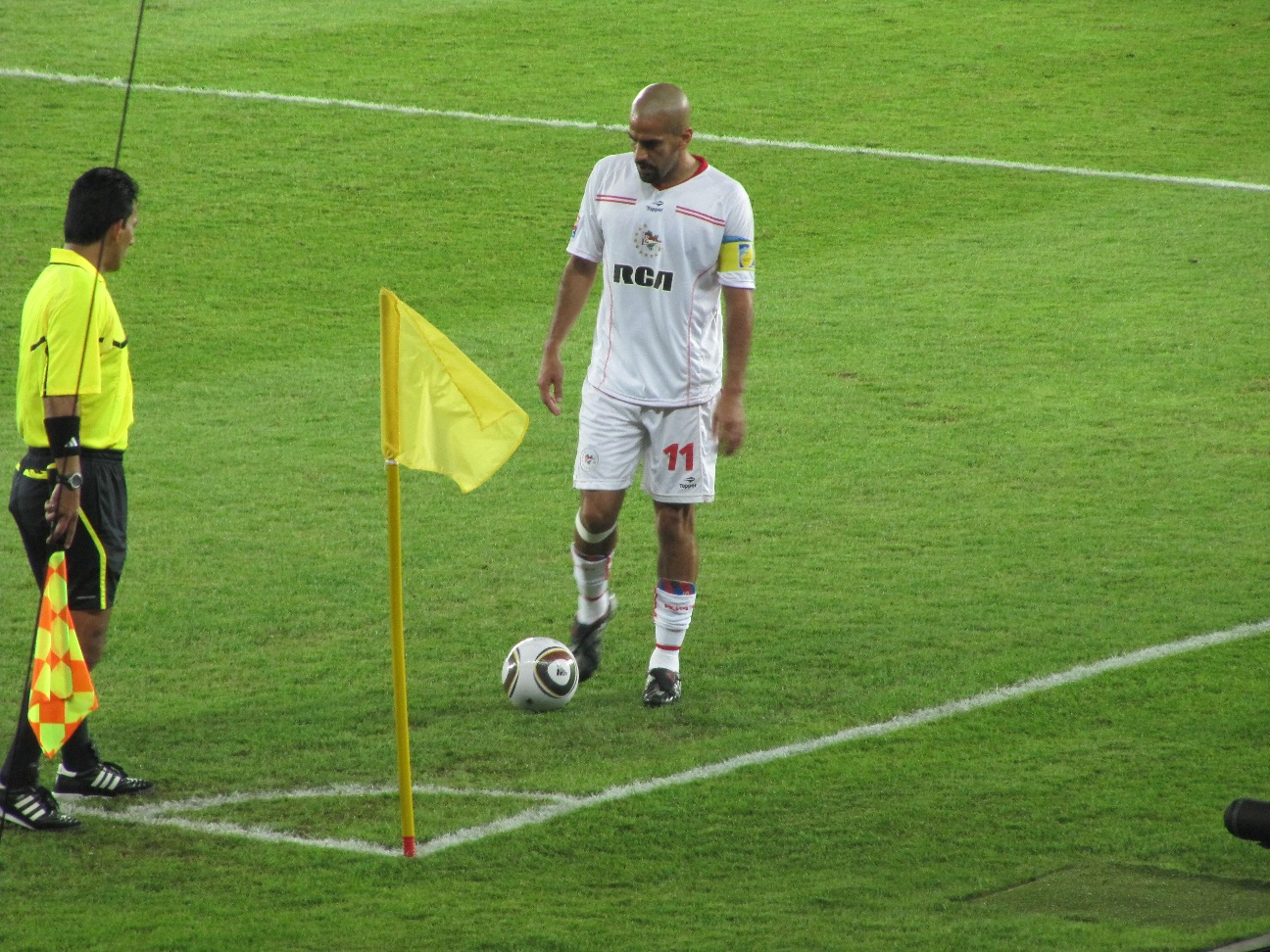
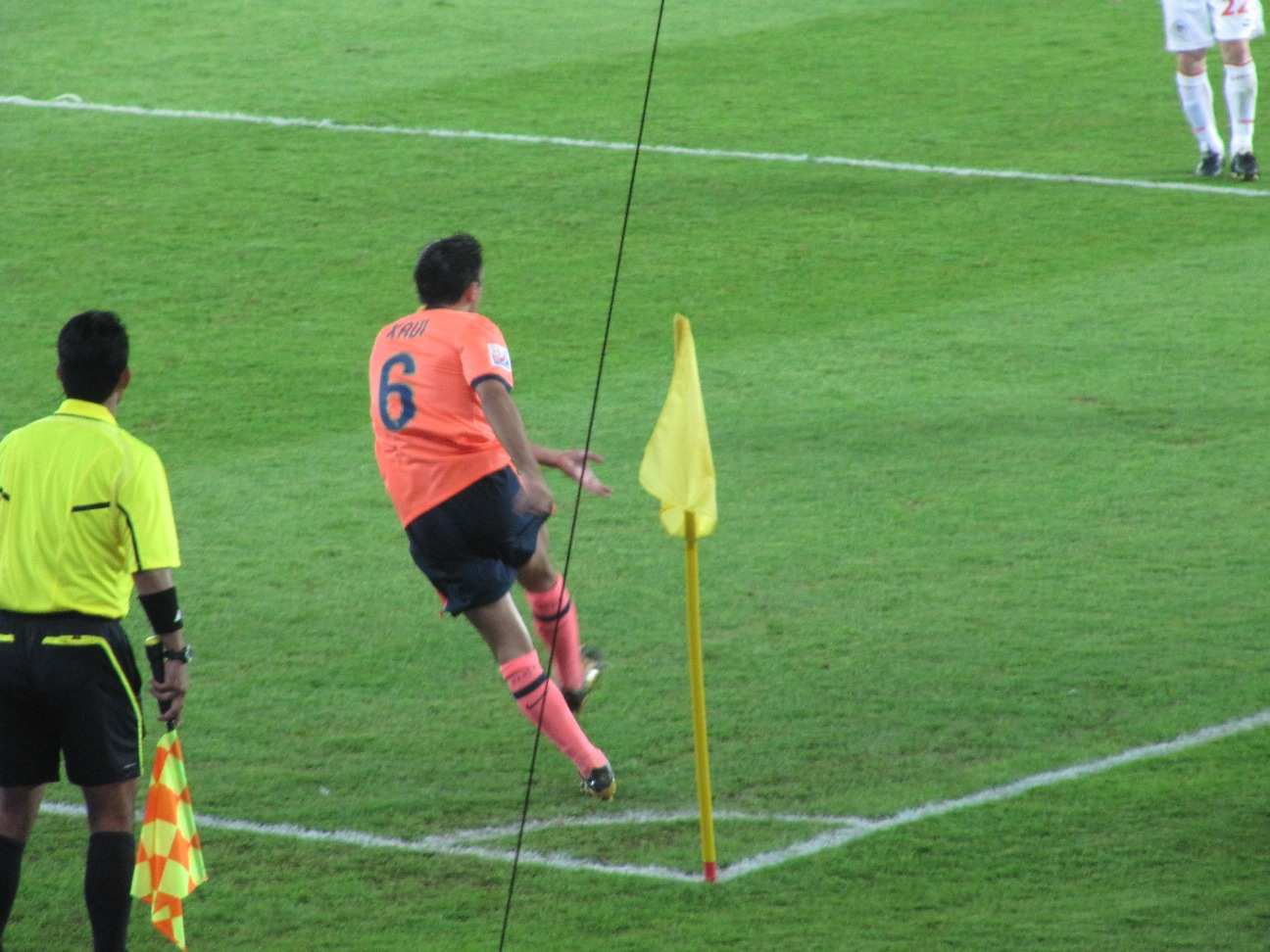
Two moments of the match, with both teams taking a corner kick: Juan Sebastián Verón for Estudiantes on the left and Xavi for Barcelona on the right.
19 December 2009
20:00 UTC+4

Estudiantes (LP) (Argentina)	1–2 (a.e.t.)	(Spain) Barcelona
Boselli 37'	Report	Pedro 89'; Messi 110'

Zayed Sports City, Abu Dhabi
Attendance: 43,050
Referee: Benito Archundia (Mexico)

Estudiantes (LP)	Barcelona

GK	25	(Argentina) Damián Albil
CB	2	(Argentina) Leandro Desábato	(yellow card) 119'
CB	16	(Argentina) Germán Ré		(substituted off) 90+1'
CB	3	(Argentina) Christian Cellay
RM	13	(Uruguay) Juan Manuel Díaz	(yellow card) 45+2'
CM	8	(Argentina) Enzo Pérez	(yellow card) 65'	(substituted off) 79'
CM	22	(Argentina) Rodrigo Braña	(yellow card) 119'
LM	30	(Argentina) Clemente Rodríguez	(yellow card) 58'
AM	11	(Argentina) Juan Sebastián Verón (c)
AM	23	(Argentina) Leandro Benítez		(substituted off) 76'
CF	17	(Argentina) Mauro Boselli
Substitutions:
MF	5	(Argentina) Matías Sánchez	(yellow card) 94'	(substituted on) 76'
MF	18	(Argentina) Maximiliano Núñez		(substituted on) 79'
DF	21	(Argentina) Marcos Rojo	(yellow card) 112'	(substituted on) 90+1'
Manager:
(Argentina) Alejandro Sabella

GK	1	(Spain) Víctor Valdés	(yellow card) 118'
RB	2	(Brazil) Dani Alves
CB	3	(Spain) Gerard Piqué
CB	5	(Spain) Carles Puyol (c)
LB	22	(France) Eric Abidal
DM	15	(Mali) Seydou Keita		(substituted off) 46'
CM	6	(Spain) Xavi
CM	16	(Spain) Sergio Busquets		(substituted off) 79'
RW	10	(Argentina) Lionel Messi	(yellow card) 23'
LW	14	(France) Thierry Henry	(yellow card) 82'	(substituted off) 83'
CF	9	(Sweden) Zlatan Ibrahimović
Substitutions:
FW	17	(Spain) Pedro		(substituted on) 46'
MF	24	(Ivory Coast) Yaya Touré		(substituted on) 79'
FW	7	(Spain) Jeffrén		(substituted on) 83'
Manager:
(Spain) Pep Guardiola

Assistant referees:
Héctor Vergara (Canada)
Marvin Torrentera (Mexico)
Fourth official:
Ravshan Irmatov (Uzbekistan)
Reserve assistant referee:
Abdukhamidullo Rasulov (Uzbekistan)

Match rules

- 90 minutes.
- 30 minutes of extra-time if necessary.
- Penalty shoot-out if scores still level.
- Twelve named substitutes.
- Maximum of three substitutions.

=== Statistics ===
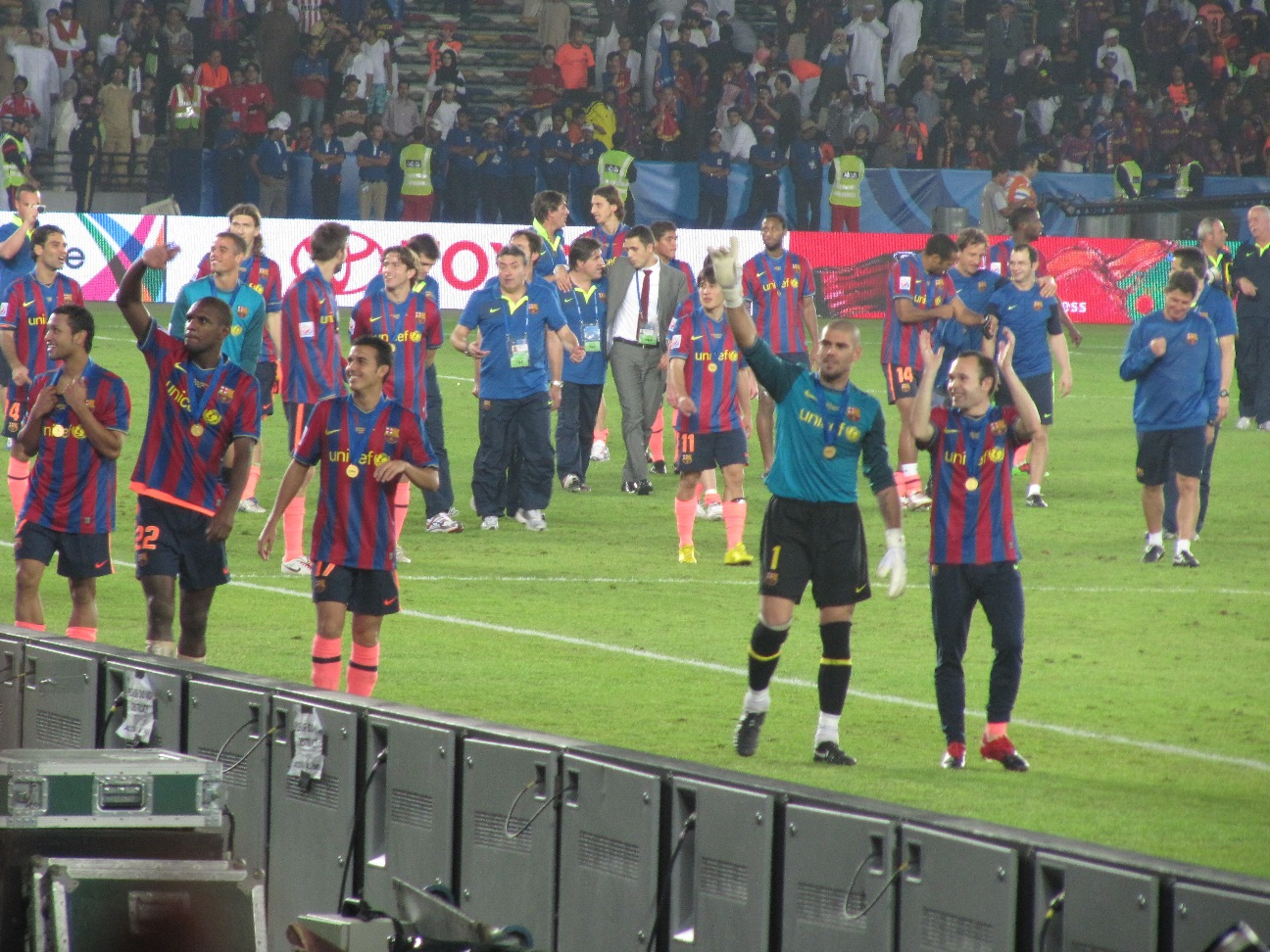
Barcelona players celebrate after the match

Overall
	Estudiantes	Barcelona
Goals scored	1	2
Total shots	3	16
Shots on target	1	4
Ball possession	36%	64%
Corner kicks	3	10
Fouls committed	29	19
Offsides	8	1
Yellow cards	7	3
Red cards	0	0
