= 2009 Copa Libertadores knockout stage =

The last four stages of the 2009 Copa Santander Libertadores are the knockout stages: the Round of 16, the Quarterfinals, the Semifinals, and the Finals.

== Format ==
The remaining stages of the tournament constitute a single-elimination tournament. In each stage, the teams will play an opponent in a two-legged tie on a home-away basis. Each team will earn three points for a win, one point for a draw, and zero points for a loss. The team with the most points at the end of each tie will advance.

=== Tie-breaking ===
The following criteria will be used for breaking ties on points:

1. Better goal difference
2. More goals scored
3. More away goals scored
4. Penalty shootout

=== Seeding ===
The 16 qualified teams in the knockout round will be seeded according to their results in the group stage. The top teams from each group are seeded 1-8, with the team with the most points as seed 1 and the team with the least as seed 8. The second-best teams from each group are seeded 9-16, with the team with the most points as seed 9 and the team with the least as seed 16. Teams with a higher seed will play the second leg of each tie at home.

Teams qualified as a group winner
Seed	Team	Pts	GD	GF	AG
1	(Brazil) Grêmio	16	+10	11	5
2	(Argentina) Boca Juniors	15	+8	11	4
3	(Uruguay) Nacional	14	+9	12	4
4	(Brazil) São Paulo	13	+4	10	5
5	(Brazil) Cruzeiro	13	+4	9	2
6	(Brazil) Sport Recife	13	+3	10	6
7	(Paraguay) Libertad	12	+2	7	3
8	(Venezuela) Caracas	10	+3	7	1

Teams qualified as a runner-up
Seed	Team	Pts	GD	GF	AG
9	(Ecuador) Deportivo Cuenca	10	+5	9	1
10	(Argentina) Estudiantes	10	+5	9	0
11	(Brazil) Palmeiras	10	+2	9	5
12	Universidad de Chile	10	+2	8	2
13	(Mexico) Guadalajara	9	+3	9	2
14	(Mexico) San Luis	8	0	7	0
15	(Uruguay) Defensor Sporting	8	0	5	1
16	(Peru) Universidad San Martín	8	−2	7	2

== Bracket ==
Round of 16
1	(Brazil) Grêmio	3	2
16	(Peru) U. San Martín	1	0
8	(Venezuela) Caracas	1	4
9	(Ecuador) Cuenca	2	0
4	(Brazil) São Paulo	–	–
13	(Mexico) Guadalajara	–	–
5	(Brazil) Cruzeiro	2	1
12	U. de Chile	1	0
3	(Uruguay) Nacional	–	–
14	(Mexico) San Luis	–	–
6	(Brazil) Sport Recife	0	1 (1)
11	(Brazil) Palmeiras (p)	1	0 (3)
7	(Paraguay) Libertad	0	0
10	(Argentina) Estudiantes	3	0
2	(Argentina) Boca Juniors	2	0
15	(Uruguay) Defensor S.	2	1

Quarterfinals
1	(Brazil) Grêmio (a)	1	0
8	(Venezuela) Caracas	1	0
4	(Brazil) São Paulo	1	0
5	(Brazil) Cruzeiro	2	2
3	(Uruguay) Nacional (a)	1	0
11	(Brazil) Palmeiras	1	0
10	(Argentina) Estudiantes	1	1
15	(Uruguay) Defensor Sporting	0	0

Semifinals
1	(Brazil) Grêmio	1	2
5	(Brazil) Cruzeiro	3	2
3	(Uruguay) Nacional	0	1
10	(Argentina) Estudiantes	1	2

Finals
5	(Brazil) Cruzeiro	0	1
10	(Argentina) Estudiantes	0	2

== Round of 16 ==
The Round of 16 began on May 5. Team #1, as the higher seeded team, played the second leg at home.

Teams			Scores		Tie-breakers		
Team #1	Points	Team #2	1st leg	2nd leg	GD	AG	Pen.
Grêmio (Brazil)	6:0	(Peru) Universidad San Martín	3–1	2–0	—	—	—
Boca Juniors (Argentina)	1:4	(Uruguay) Defensor Sporting	2–2	0–1	—	—	—
Nacional (Uruguay)	w/o^{[A]}	(Mexico) San Luis	—	—	—	—	—
São Paulo (Brazil)	w/o^{[A]}	(Mexico) Guadalajara	—	—	—	—	—
Cruzeiro (Brazil)	6:0	Universidad de Chile	2–1	1–0	—	—	—
Sport Recife (Brazil)	3:3	(Brazil) Palmeiras	0–1	1–0	0:0	0:0	1:3
Libertad (Paraguay)	1:4	(Argentina) Estudiantes	0–3	0–0	—	—	—
Caracas (Venezuela)	3:3	(Ecuador) Deportivo Cuenca	1–2	4–0	+3:−3	—	—

- ^1Guadalajara and San Luis withdrew from the tournament after an agreement on an alternative venue for the first legs, both scheduled to be played in Mexico, was unable to be agreed upon following concerns raised by both Nacional and São Paulo over the Swine flu outbreak in Mexico.

=== First leg ===
May 5, 2009
21:15 UTC−03:00

Palmeiras (Brazil)	1–0	(Brazil) Sport Recife
Ortigoza 74'	Report

Estádio Palestra Italia (Parque Antarctica), São Paulo
Attendance: 23,991
Referee: Sergio Pezzotta (Argentina)

May 6, 2009
19:50 UTC−05:00

Universidad San Martín (Peru)	1–3	(Brazil) Grêmio
Arzuaga 34'	Report	Souza 9'; López 46', 61'

Estadio Alejandro Villanueva, Lima
Referee: Carlos Vera (Ecuador)

May 7, 2009
15:50 UTC−05:00

Deportivo Cuenca (Ecuador)	2–1	(Venezuela) Caracas
Teixeira 58'; Villalba 69'	Report	Cichero 3'

Estadio Alejandro Serrano Aguilar, Cuenca
Referee: Víctor Hugo Rivera (Peru)

May 7, 2009
19:40 UTC−03:00

Estudiantes (Argentina)	3–0	(Paraguay) Libertad
G. Fernández 1'; Boselli 64' (pen.), 70'	Report

Estadio Ciudad de La Plata, La Plata
Attendance: 20,912
Referee: Carlos Simon (Brazil)

May 7, 2009
21:00 UTC−04:00

Universidad de Chile	1–2	(Brazil) Cruzeiro
Villalobos 85'	Report	Soares 8'; Marquinhos Paraná 52'

Estadio Nacional, Santiago
Referee: Jorge Larrionda (Uruguay)

May 14, 2009
22:00 UTC−03:00

Defensor Sporting (Uruguay)	2–2	(Argentina) Boca Juniors
Gaglianone 45'; Mora 84'	Report	Palermo 3'; Palacio 56'

Estadio Centenario, Montevideo
Referee: Carlos Torres (Paraguay)

=== Second leg ===
May 12, 2009
20:15 UTC−03:00

Sport Recife (Brazil)	1–0	(Brazil) Palmeiras
Wilson 83'	Report
Penalties
Luciano Henrique (penalty missed); Igor (penalty scored); Fumagalli (penalty missed); Dutra (penalty missed)	1–3	(penalty missed) Mozart; (penalty scored) Marcão; (penalty scored) Danilo; (penalty scored) Armero

Estádio Adelmar Costa Carvalho (Ilha do Retiro), Recife
Attendance: 28,487
Referee: Carlos Chandía (Chile)

Sport Recife 3–3 Palmeiras on points, Sport Recife & Palmeiras tied on goal difference and goals scored. Palmeiras won 3–1 on penalties.

May 12, 2009
21:15 UTC−04:30

Caracas (Venezuela)	4–0	(Ecuador) Deportivo Cuenca
Figueroa 24' (pen.); Prieto 42'; Rentería 52'; Rey 73'	Report

Estadio Olímpico UCV, Caracas
Referee: Pablo Lunati (Argentina)

Caracas 3–3 Deportivo Cuenca on points. Caracas won +3 on goal difference.

May 13, 2009
21:50 UTC−03:00

Grêmio (Brazil)	2–0	(Peru) Universidad San Martín
Jonas 17'; Herrera 74'	Report

Estádio Olímpico Monumental, Porto Alegre
Attendance: 23,839
Referee: Antonio Arias (Paraguay)

Grêmio won 6–0 on points.

May 14, 2009
19:30 UTC−03:00

Cruzeiro (Brazil)	1–0	Universidad de Chile
Kléber 74'	Report

Estádio Governador Magalhães Pinto (Mineirão), Belo Horizonte
Attendance: 56,898
Referee: Héctor Baldassi (Argentina)

Cruzeiro won 6–0 on points.

May 14, 2009
21:00 UTC−03:00

Libertad (Paraguay)	0–0	(Argentina) Estudiantes
	Report

Estadio Feliciano Cáceres, Luque
Attendance: 1,987
Referee: Roberto Silvera (Uruguay)

Estudiantes won 4–1 on points.

May 21, 2009
19:50 UTC−03:00

Boca Juniors (Argentina)	0–1	(Uruguay) Defensor Sporting
	Report	De Souza 27'

Estadio Alberto J. Armando (La Bombonera), Buenos Aires
Attendance: 50,000
Referee: Salvio Fagundes (Brazil)

Defensor Sporting won 4–1 on points.

== Quarterfinals ==
Team #1, as the higher seed, will play the second leg at home.

Teams			Scores		Tie-breakers		
Team #1	Points	Team #2	1st leg	2nd leg	GD	AG	Pen.
Grêmio (Brazil)	2:2	(Venezuela) Caracas	1–1	0–0	0:0	1:0	—
Estudiantes (Argentina)	6:0	(Uruguay) Defensor Sporting	1–0	1–0	—	—	—
Nacional (Uruguay)	2:2	(Brazil) Palmeiras	1–1	0–0	0:0	1:0	—
São Paulo (Brazil)	0:6	(Brazil) Cruzeiro	1–2	0–2	—	—	—

=== First leg ===
May 27, 2009
21:50 UTC−03:00

Cruzeiro (Brazil)	2–1	(Brazil) São Paulo
Leonardo Silva 45'; Zé Carlos 65'	Report	Washington 57'

Estádio Governador Magalhães Pinto (Mineirão), Belo Horizonte
Attendance: 52,906
Referee: Carlos Chandía (Chile)

May 27, 2009
20:20 UTC−04:30

Caracas (Venezuela)	1–1	(Brazil) Grêmio
Cichero 2'	Report	Fábio Santos 75'

Estadio Olímpico, Caracas
Referee: Roberto Silvera (Uruguay)

May 28, 2009
19:30 UTC−03:00

Defensor Sporting (Uruguay)	0–1	(Argentina) Estudiantes
	Report	Desábato 13'

Estadio Centenario, Montevideo
Referee: Juan Soto (Venezuela)

May 28, 2009
22:00 UTC−03:00

Palmeiras (Brazil)	1–1	(Uruguay) Nacional
Diego Souza 55'	Report	García 80'

Estádio Palestra Italia (Parque Antártica), São Paulo
Attendance: 24,737
Referee: Carlos Torres (Paraguay)

=== Second leg ===
June 17, 2009
19:20 UTC−03:00

Nacional (Uruguay)	0–0	(Brazil) Palmeiras
	Report

Estadio Centenario, Montevideo
Attendance: 46,269
Referee: Carlos Vera (Ecuador)

Nacional 2–2 Palmeiras on points. Nacional and Palmeiras tied on goal difference and goals scored. Nacional advances on away goals.

June 17, 2009
21:50 UTC−03:00

Grêmio (Brazil)	0–0	(Venezuela) Caracas
	Report

Estádio Olímpico, Porto Alegre
Attendance: 36,725
Referee: Carlos Torres (Paraguay)

Grêmio 2−2 Caracas on points. Grêmio and Caracas tied on goal difference and goals scored. Grêmio advances on away goals.

June 18, 2009
19:30 UTC−03:00

Estudiantes (Argentina)	1–0	(Uruguay) Defensor Sporting
Benítez 13'	Report

Estadio Ciudad de La Plata, La Plata
Attendance: 27,855
Referee: Óscar Ruiz (Colombia)

Estudiantes advances 6–0 on points.

June 18, 2009
22:00 UTC−03:00

São Paulo (Brazil)	0–2	(Brazil) Cruzeiro
	Report	Henrique 65'; Kléber 81' (pen.)

Estádio Cícero Pompeu de Toledo (Morumbi), São Paulo
Attendance: 52,809
Referee: Sergio Pezzotta (Argentina)

Cruzeiro advances 6–0 on points.

== Semifinals ==
Teams			Scores		Tie-breakers		
Team #1	Points	Team #2	1st leg	2nd leg	GD	AG	Pen.
Grêmio (Brazil)	1:4	(Brazil) Cruzeiro	1–3	2–2	—	—	—
Nacional (Uruguay)	0:6	(Argentina) Estudiantes	0–1	1–2	—	—	—

=== First leg ===
June 24, 2009
21:50 UTC−03:00

Cruzeiro (Brazil)	3–1	(Brazil) Grêmio
Wellington Paulista 38'; Wágner 47'; Fabinho 67'	Report	Souza 78'

Estádio Governador Magalhães Pinto (Mineirão), Belo Horizonte
Attendance: 51,696
Referee: Enrique Osses (Chile)

June 25, 2009
19:30 UTC−03:00

Estudiantes (Argentina)	1–0	(Uruguay) Nacional
Galván 14'	Report

Estadio Ciudad de La Plata, La Plata
Referee: René Ortubé (Bolivia)

=== Second leg ===
July 1, 2009
21:15 UTC−03:00

Nacional (Uruguay)	1–2	(Argentina) Estudiantes
Medina 75'	Report	Boselli 52', 90+1'

Estadio Centenario, Montevideo
Attendance: 46,983
Referee: Carlos Torres (Paraguay)

Estudiantes advances 6–0 on points.

July 2, 2009
21:50 UTC−03:00

Grêmio (Brazil)	2–2	(Brazil) Cruzeiro
Rever 55'; Souza 75'	Report	Wellington Paulista 34', 36'

Estádio Olímpico, Porto Alegre
Attendance: 40,452
Referee: Óscar Ruiz (Colombia)

Cruzeiro advances 4–1 on points.

== Finals ==
The Finals was played on July 8 and 15.

Team #1	Points earned	Team #2	1st leg	2nd leg
Cruzeiro (Brazil)	1–4	(Argentina) Estudiantes	0–0	1–2

=== First leg ===
July 8, 2009
21:50 UTC−03:00

Estudiantes (Argentina)	0–0	(Brazil) Cruzeiro
	Report

Estadio Ciudad de La Plata, La Plata
Referee: Jorge Larrionda (Uruguay)

=== Second leg ===
July 15, 2009
21:50 UTC−03:00

Cruzeiro (Brazil)	1–2	(Argentina) Estudiantes
Henrique 52'	Report	Fernández 57'; Boselli 73'

Estádio Governador Magalhães Pinto (Mineirão), Belo Horizonte
Referee: Carlos Chandía (Chile)

== Footnotes ==
A. Guadalajara and San Luis withdrew from the tournament following concerns raised by both Nacional and São Paulo over the H1N1 flu outbreak in Mexico, South American teams refused to travel to Mexico to play the match; no agreement was reached on alternative venues for the first-leg matches, both scheduled to be played in Mexico. Both Guadalajara and San Luis were later secured a place in the round of 16 for the 2010 Copa Libertadores.

l.
