= Pedro Moreno =

Pedro Moreno may refer to:

- Pedro Moreno (soldier) (1775-1817), Mexican insurgent
- Pedro Moreno (actor) (born 1980), Cuban actor
- Pedro Moreno (footballer) (born 1951), Spanish footballer
- Pedro Juan Moreno, Colombian racing driver

== See also ==
- Pedro Morenés (born 1948), Spanish politician
