= Lauro (footballer, born 1980) =

Brazilian footballer

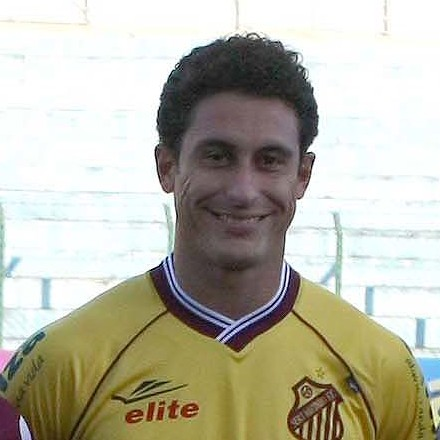

Personal information
- Full name: Lauro Júnior Batista da Cruz
- Date of birth: 3 September 1980 (age 46)
- Place of birth: Andradina, Brazil
- Height: 1.93 m (6 ft 4 in)
- Position: Goalkeeper

Team information
- Current team: Joinville

Youth career
- Radium

Senior career*
Years	Team	Apps	(Gls)
1999–2001	Radium	20	(0)
2001–2005	Ponte Preta	115	(1)
2006–2008	Cruzeiro	6	(0)
2008	→ Sertãozinho (loan)	17	(0)
2008–2014	Internacional	52	(0)
2012	→ Ponte Preta (loan)	2	(0)
2013	→ Portuguesa (loan)	32	(1)
2014	Chapecoense	0	(0)
2015	Bragantino	1	(0)
2015–2016	Lajeadense	0	(0)
2016	Atlético Mineiro	0	(0)
2016–2017	Ceará	2	(0)
2017–	Joinville	0	(0)
- * Club domestic league appearances and goals as of 8 October 2017

Lauro Júnior Batista da Cruz, simply known as Lauro (born 3 September 1980), is a Brazilian footballer who plays as a goalkeeper for Joinville Esporte Clube.

== Career ==
Born on 3 September 1980 in Andradina, Lauro began his career in the youth ranks of Radium, making his senior debut in 1999, where he stayed for two years, until 2001, when he signed for Ponte Preta. On 3 August 2003, the 22-year-old Lauro scored a last-minute header against Flamengo to salvage a 1–1 draw in Série A.

In 2006, the 26-year-old Lauro signed for Cruzeiro, but his career there was cut short by an injury sustained the following year, so he was loaned out to Sertãozinho. In 2008, he was sought after by Internacional, whose goalkeepers Renan and Muriel had caught hepatitis. Once Renan was sold to Valencia, Internacional bought Lauro from Cruzeiro for 500,000 reals. In his first months at the club, he won the 2008 Copa Sudamericana, starting in both legs of the final against Estudiantes LP, which ended in a 2–1 aggregate victory. Lauro thus replaced the 40-year-old Clemer as Internacional's new undisputed goalkeeper.

Lauro stayed at the club for five years, from 2008 until 2013, spending the latter two seasons on loan to Ponte Preta and Portuguesa. On 7 August 2013, he scored a last-minute header against Flamengo to salvage a 1–1 draw in Série A, thus accurately recreating the same scenario that had unfolded 10 years and 4 days before. In doing so, he became one of the few goalkeepers to have scored multiple goals from open play, joining an elite group that also includes Peter Schmeichel, Miguel Calero, and Óscar Pérez.

== List of goals scored ==
Following, is the list with the goals scored by Clemer:

#	Date	Venue	Host team	Result	Away team	Competition	Score	Type	Opponent goalkeeper
1	3 August 2003	Estádio Moisés Lucarelli, São Paulo	Ponte Preta	1–1	Flamengo	Série A	1–1	Header	
2	7 August 2013	Estádio Nacional Mané Garrincha, Brasília	Portuguesa	1–1	Flamengo	Série A	1–1	Header	

== Honours ==
Internacional

- Copa Sudamericana: 2008
- Copa Libertadores: 2010

== See also ==
- List of goalscoring goalkeepers
