= Germán Ré =

Argentine footballer (born 1981)

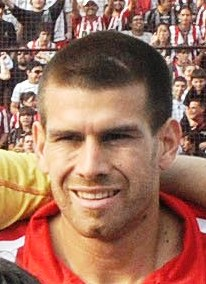
- Ré with Estudiantes in 2010

Personal information
- Full name: Germán David Ré
- Date of birth: November 2, 1981 (age 45)
- Place of birth: Villa Gobernador Gálvez, Argentina
- Height: 1.80 m (5 ft 11 in)
- Positions: Full back; centre back

Team information
- Current team: Villa San Carlos

Senior career*
Years	Team	Apps	(Gls)
2002–2008	Newell's Old Boys	195	(5)
2009–2014	Estudiantes LP	130	(1)
2015	Atlético de Rafaela	22	(0)
2016–2019	Chacarita Juniors	97	(1)
2019–2020	Villa San Carlos	9	(0)
- * Club domestic league appearances and goals as of 00:18, 24 March 2020 (UTC)

Germán David Ré (born 2 November 1981) is a former Argentine football defender.

== Career ==
Ré made his debut for Newell's Old Boys in 2002, and went on to make over 150 appearances for the club. In 2004, he was part of the squad that won the 2004 Apertura tournament, playing mostly as a left-back. On October 29, 2008, Ré played his 200th game for Newell's in a 1–1 draw with River Plate.

On 2 February 2009, he joined Estudiantes de La Plata on a three-year contract. Later that year, the defender played in the final of Copa Libertadores, helping Estudiantes win the title for the first time since 1970. In Estudiantes, Ré has been used both as a centre-back (alongside Leandro Desábato or Christian Cellay) or as a left-back, especially after the departure of Juan Manuel Díaz in January 2010.

In 2015, he joined to Atlético de Rafaela.

== Honours ==
Newell's Old Boys

- Argentine Primera División (1): 2004 Apertura

Estudiantes

- Copa Libertadores (1): 2009
- Argentine Primera División (1): 2010 Apertura
