= Iván Moreno y Fabianesi =

Spanish-Argentine footballer

Personal information
- Full name: Iván Diego Moreno y Fabianesi
- Date of birth: 4 June 1979 (age 47)
- Place of birth: Badajoz, Spain
- Height: 1.75 m (5 ft 9 in)
- Position: Midfielder

Senior career*
Years	Team	Apps	(Gls)
1998–2001	Rosario Central	80	(13)
2001–2002	Villarreal	0	(0)
2002	Porto	0	(0)
2002–2003	Banfield	36	(7)
2003–2005	Colón	86	(17)
2006	Morelia	18	(2)
2006–2007	Vélez Sársfield	31	(4)
2007–2008	Estudiantes La Plata	52	(6)
2009	Rosario Central	18	(5)
2009–2010	Skoda Xanthi	8	(0)
2010–2013	Colón	123	(17)
2014	Liverpool Montevideo	12	(2)
2014–2015	Huracán	17	(1)
- * Club domestic league appearances and goals as of 4 May 2015

Iván Diego Moreno y Fabianesi (born 4 June 1979) is a Spanish-Argentine retired footballer.

== Early life ==
He was born in Badajoz, Spain, the third child of a Spanish father, Ignacio Pedro Moreno Carballo (a professional footballer), and an Argentine mother. As a child, Moreno lived in Spain and Argentina following his parents' multiple relocations.

== Playing career ==
Moreno y Fabianesi made his professional debut for Rosario Central on 18 October 1998 in a 1–1 away draw against Independiente. During his stint with Rosario Central he claimed his Argentine citizenship right, to avoid filling up a "foreigner" slot in Argentine clubs. When drafted by then-coach José Pekerman to the Argentine under-20 team, Moreno accepted, thus preempting any eventual call to the Spain national football team.

Moreno's career in Spain had little success. During his tenure with Villarreal CF, he played mostly with the Onda farm team. He was more successful in Mexico, to the point that Argentina's Vélez Sársfield brought him to fulfill a key slot in midfield. After a modest success under coach Ricardo La Volpe, Moreno was transferred in June 2007 to Estudiantes de La Plata, where he played as a creative midfielder, mostly on the right, while helping Rodrigo Braña in the defensive department. After a brief return to Rosario Central, in 2009 he played for Greek side Skoda Xanthi, but he returned to Argentina after only 8 games in Greece to sign for Cólon.

In January 2014, he signed a new contract with Uruguayan side Liverpool.

== Nickname ==
In Argentina, he is known as the "Torero (bullfighter)" because of his signature goal celebration, imitating a matador's pass, which was conceived to dedicate the goal to his parents in Spain.
