= Pedro Moreno (footballer) =

Spanish footballer

Personal information
- Full name: Ignacio Pedro Moreno Carballo
- Date of birth: 29 June 1951 (age 75)
- Place of birth: Las Palmas, Spain
- Position: Defender

Senior career*
Years	Team	Apps	(Gls)
–1972	Argentino Oeste		
1972–1974	Granada	3	(0)
1973–1974	→ Levante (loan)	12	(0)
–	Mérida		
- * Club domestic league appearances and goals

Pedro Moreno (born 29 June 1951) is a former footballer who played professionally in Spain's La Liga.

== Career ==
Born in Las Palmas, Moreno moved to Argentina where he began his football career with Argentino Oeste. At age 21, he returned to Spain where he signed with Granada CF. He played sparingly during his first season with the club, and moved on loan to Segunda División side Levante UD for the second half of the 1973–74 season. Moreno also played for CP Mérida.

== Personal ==
Moreno's son, Iván, is also a professional footballer.
