= Raúl Iberbia =

Argentine footballer

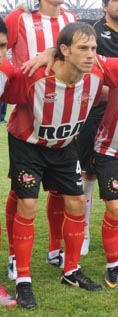

Personal information
- Full name: Raúl Alejandro Iberbia
- Date of birth: 25 December 1989 (age 36)
- Place of birth: Carmen de Areco, Argentina
- Height: 1.74 m (5 ft 9 in)
- Position: Left back

Team information
- Current team: Villa San Carlos

Youth career
- 2004–2007: Estudiantes La Plata

Senior career*
Years	Team	Apps	(Gls)
2008–2013	Estudiantes La Plata	83	(2)
2013–2014	Coritiba	4	(0)
2014–2016	San Martín SJ	34	(0)
2016–2017	Colón	18	(0)
2017–2018	Los Andes	19	(0)
2018–2019	Olimpo	8	(0)
2019–2020	San Martín SJ	5	(0)
2020–2020	Gimnasia Mendoza	0	(0)
2021–	Villa San Carlos	0	(0)
- * Club domestic league appearances and goals as of 14:06, 28 March 2021 (UTC)

Raúl Alejandro Iberbia (born 25 December 1989) is an Argentine footballer who currently plays for Villa San Carlos as a left back.

Iberbia made his football career at Estudiantes de La Plata youth system at a very young age, being promoted to the first–adult team in the 2008 season and debuting in a league game on 17 October of the same year against Gimnasia de Jujuy with Leonardo Astrada as coach. The next year, he was part of team champion of the 2009 Copa Libertadores and also of the team runner–up of the same year's FIFA Club World Cup, lost against Barcelona.

After two seasons, proclaiming champion with his club of the Apertura Tournament, but not playing many games, he received an offer of Chilean Primera División club O'Higgins directed by his former coach Eduardo Berizzo, but however, Iberbia rejected the offer for find most opportunities at La Plata's team.

== Honours ==
=== Club ===
Estudiantes de La Plata

- Copa Libertadores: 2009
- FIFA Club World Cup runner up: 2009
- Primera División Argentina: 2010 Apertura
