= Kléber (footballer, born 1983) =

Brazilian footballer

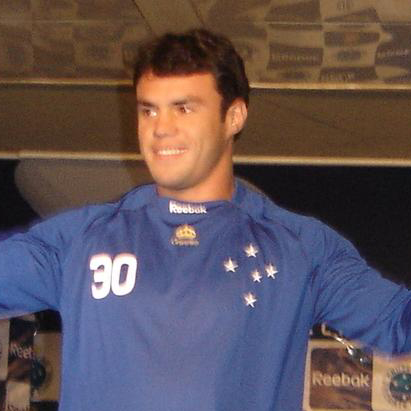

Personal information
- Full name: Kléber Giacomazzi de Souza Freitas
- Date of birth: 12 August 1983 (age 43)
- Place of birth: Osasco, Brazil
- Height: 1.73 m (5 ft 8 in)
- Position: Striker

Youth career
- 1994–2002: São Paulo

Senior career*
Years	Team	Apps	(Gls)
2003	São Paulo	45	(10)
2004–2009	Dynamo Kyiv	74	(28)
2004	→ Dynamo-2 Kyiv	1	(0)
2008	→ Palmeiras (loan)	30	(8)
2009–2010	Cruzeiro	19	(9)
2010–2011	Palmeiras	41	(11)
2011–2015	Grêmio	62	(11)
2014	→ Vasco da Gama (loan)	14	(4)
2015–2018	Coritiba	37	(10)
2019–2020	Austin Bold	32	(12)

International career
2003	Brazil U20	7	(1)
- * Club domestic league appearances and goals as of 6 October 2020

Kléber Giacomazzi de Souza Freitas (born 12 August 1983), known simply as Kléber, is a Brazilian former professional footballer.

== Club career ==
Kléber started his career playing for São Paulo, in 2003. The young forward – he was 20 years old – shined in the 2003 Campeonato Brasileiro Série A, when São Paulo finished in third place, and in the 2003 Copa Sudamericana, a competition where the club was eliminated in the semifinals, against Argentinian side, River Plate. In December, Kléber also won the 2003 FIFA U-20 World Cup, along with other future Brazilian soccer stars, such as Nilmar, Dagoberto, Daniel Alves and Jefferson.

In 2004, Kléber was sold to Ukrainian side Dynamo Kyiv for US$2 million. On January 14, the player was presented in his new club.

In 2008, after four years of playing in Europe, he came back to Brazil, being loaned out to Sociedade Esportiva Palmeiras from FC Dynamo Kyiv.

He was part of the transfer of Guilherme to Dynamo which sent Kléber in the opposite direction to Cruzeiro in February 2009 arriving from Palmeiras. He signed a contract until February 2014.

In his first match for Cruzeiro, De Souza Freitas scored two goals and was dismissed in the first half, playing in the 2009 Copa Libertadores. After the match, he stated that he would stop being so aggressive in games and would only dedicate himself for the club. He helped Cruzeiro reach the Finals of the Libertadores, eventually losing to Estudiantes, from Argentina, in the decisive second leg match. After the shocking defeat in the Mineirão stadium, he injured himself in training and played only 15 league matches in 2009, although he helped Cruzeiro finish in fourth place and qualify to the 2010 Copa Libertadores, scoring a decisive goal against Santos at Vila Belmiro in the final minutes of the last match of the year.

In July 2010, after a good season start, scoring two goals in four matches in the 2010 league for Cruzeiro, he agreed a transfer to his former club, Palmeiras, where he had played in 2008. He was very well received by the club that had a great affection for him. In Palmeiras, the fans nicknamed him "Gladiador" (Gladiator), for his strong determination and high talent on the field.

In October 2011, he strongly criticized Palmeiras coach Luis Felipe Scolari in a television interview, saying that, "80 percent of the squad do not like him." He was removed from the squad right away, following friction with the coach. Although he was under contract with the club until 2015, the board of Palmeiras confirmed that he would never represent the club again.

In November 2011, he signed a five-year contract with Grêmio, after Palmeiras agreed to sell the 50 percent of his playing rights.

In June 2014, Grêmio loaned him to Vasco da Gama until the end of the season.

On 2015, Kleber returned from his loaned to Grêmio, the Coach from Grêmio at the time was Luis Felipe Scolari, the same coach Klebler criticized back in 2011, and they said that Kleber was going to be negotiated. After more than three months not receiving his salary, Kleber "broke the contract" with Grêmio and make an agreement with the Worker Justice and Grêmio to receive about 60 payment from R$220,000.

In June 2015, Kleber signed with Coritiba Foot Ball Club.

On 29 June 2017, Kleber was given a 15-game ban for spitting at and striking Bahia defender Edson.

== Career statistics ==
As of 28 November 2016

Club	Season	League		Cup		Continental		State League		Total	
Club	Season	Apps	Goals	Apps	Goals	Apps	Goals	Apps	Goals	Apps	Goals
Dynamo Kyiv	2003–04	5	1	2	0	0	0	0	0	7	1
Dynamo Kyiv	2004–05	22	8	5	1	8	0	0	0	35	9
Dynamo Kyiv	2005–06	0	11	2	1	0	0	0	0	2	12
Dynamo Kyiv	2006–07	15	8	3	2	4	0	0	0	22	10
Dynamo Kyiv	2007–08	9	0	0	0	2	0	0	0	11	0
Dynamo Kyiv	Total	24	27	7	3	14	0	0	0	45	30
Palmeiras	2008 (loan)	30	8	4	1	4	0	9	3	47	12
Cruzeiro	2009	15	7	0	0	11	4	12	13	38	24
Cruzeiro	2010	4	2	0	0	10	7	9	8	23	17
Cruzeiro	Total	19	9	0	0	21	11	21	21	61	41
Palmeiras	2010	22	8	0	0	6	2	0	0	28	10
Palmeiras	2011	19	3	7	5	2	1	16	8	44	17
Palmeiras	Total	71	19	11	6	12	3	25	11	119	39
Grêmio	2012	26	6	4	1	5	0	14	8	49	15
Grêmio	2013	34	5	5	0	4	0	8	2	51	7
Grêmio	2014	2	0	0	0	0	0	3	1	5	1
Grêmio	Total	62	11	9	1	9	0	25	11	105	23
Vasco da Gama	2014	24	5	4	1	0	0	0	0	28	6
Coritiba	2015	13	1	0	0	0	0	0	0	13	1
Coritiba	2016	24	9	1	1	0	0	13	13	38	23
Coritiba	2017	0	0	2	0	0	0	10	9	12	9
Coritiba	Total	37	10	3	1	0	0	23	22	45	33
Career Total		237	81	36	17	56	14	94	65	416	172

== Honours ==
=== Club ===
Dynamo Kyiv

- Ukrainian Premier League: 2004–05, 2007–08
- Ukrainian Cup: 2004–05, 2005–06, 2006–07

Palmeiras

- Campeonato Paulista: 2008

Cruzeiro

- Campeonato Mineiro: 2009

Austin Bold

- Copa Tejas: 2019

=== International ===
Brazil U20

- FIFA World Youth Championship: 2003

=== Individual ===
- Troféu Telê Santana XI: 2009
- Copa do Brasil Best Goalscorer: 2011
