= Wellington Paulista =

Brazilian footballer (born 1984)

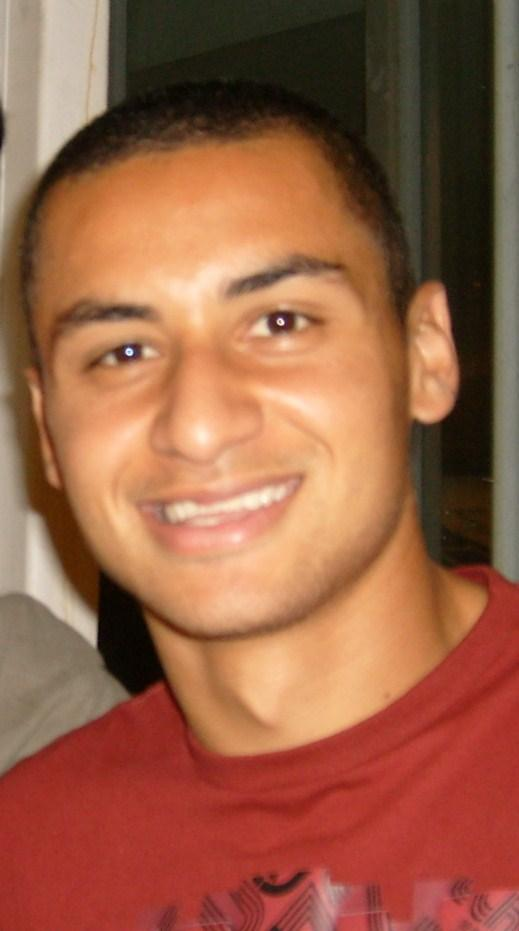

Personal information
- Full name: Wellington Pereira do Nascimento
- Date of birth: 22 April 1984 (age 42)
- Place of birth: São Paulo, Brazil
- Height: 1.83 m (6 ft 0 in)
- Position: Striker

Youth career
- 2000–2002: Juventus-SP

Senior career*
Years	Team	Apps	(Gls)
2003–2006	Juventus-SP		
2003	→ Mirassol (loan)		
2004–2005	→ Paraná (loan)	22	(0)
2006	→ Santos (loan)	30	(9)
2006–2007	Alavés	19	(2)
2007–2009	Botafogo	28	(7)
2009–2013	Cruzeiro	122	(55)
2011	→ Palmeiras (loan)	6	(0)
2013	→ West Ham United (loan)	0	(0)
2013	→ Criciúma (loan)	24	(11)
2014–2015	Internacional	39	(10)
2015	→ Coritiba (loan)	19	(4)
2015–2017	Fluminense	17	(1)
2016	→ Ponte Preta (loan)	33	(9)
2017	→ Chapecoense (loan)	50	(15)
2018–2019	Chapecoense	44	(14)
2019–2021	Fortaleza	113	(31)
2022–2023	América Mineiro	29	(5)
- * Club domestic league appearances and goals as of 20:49, 1 March 2023 (UTC)

Wellington Pereira do Nascimento (born 22 April 1984), known as Wellington Paulista, is a Brazilian former footballer who played as a forward.

== Career ==
Born in São Paulo, he started as a youth team player with Juventus-SP. He gained experience while on loan to Mirassol, Paraná and Santos, where he scored nine goals in 30 games. This performance brought him to the attention of the Spanish Second Division club Deportivo Alavés. Moving to Spain in 2006, he remained with Alavés until December 2007, when he returned to his home country to sign with Botafogo. Paulista scored seven league goals in 28 appearances and was part of the Botafogo side that won the Rio Cup.

=== Cruzeiro ===
He signed a contract with Cruzeiro in 2009, and in the same year, scored 21 times in 38 appearances to help Cruzeiro finish fourth in Serie A and win the 2009 Minas Gerais State League. Five of his goals came in the Copa Libertadores, with Cruzeiro reaching the final, where they were beaten by Estudiantes. His haul of 10 goals in 30 appearances in 2010 helped Cruzeiro finish second in Serie A and reach the quarterfinals of Copa Libertadores. Loaned to Palmeiras in 2011, Paulista returned to Cruzeiro in 2012, scoring 28 goals in 40 appearances in all competitions before leaving for West Ham United on loan in 2013.

=== West Ham United ===
On 11 January 2013, he signed a six-month loan deal with West Ham United with an option for a further three years, becoming West Ham's fourth signing of the winter 2012–13 transfer window (following Joe Cole, Marouane Chamakh and Sean Maguire). About his move, Paulista said "I think I can do my best here and I am coming to England to prove to everyone that I am one of the best strikers in Brazil and to get better and better". Paulista was a named substitute for two of West Ham's games, against Southampton and Reading, but left the club without having made a first team appearance.

=== Return to Brazil: Criciúma and Internacional ===
Wellington Paulista came to Criciúma after leaving England. After this, he signed with the Brazilian football team Internacional, being announced as their new player on 26 December 2013, after rescinding with Cruzeiro.

=== Fortaleza ===
In March 2019, he signed a two-year contract with Fortaleza.

== Honours ==
Botafogo

- Campeonato Carioca: 2008

Cruzeiro

- Campeonato Mineiro: 2009, 2011

Internacional

- Campeonato Gaúcho: 2014

Chapecoense

- Campeonato Catarinense: 2017

Fortaleza

- Campeonato Cearense: 2019, 2020, 2021
- Copa do Nordeste: 2019
