= Juan Huerta =

Argentine footballer

Personal information
- Full name: Juan Augusto Huerta
- Date of birth: July 22, 1980 (age 46)
- Place of birth: Isidro Casanova, Argentina
- Height: 1.80 m (5 ft 11 in)
- Position: Defensive midfielder

Youth career
- Nueva Chicago

Senior career*
Years	Team	Apps	(Gls)
2001–2004	Nueva Chicago	73	(1)
2004–2010	Estudiantes	31	(0)
2010	San Luis	10	(0)
2010–2011	Almirante Brown	15	(1)
2011–2013	Sportivo Italiano	27	(0)
2013–2014	Cambaceres	29	(2)
2014–2015	Flandria	18	(0)
- * Club domestic league appearances and goals

Juan Augusto Huerta (born 22 July 1980, in Isidro Casanova) is a retired Argentine footballer.

== Club career ==
Huerta has played for Nueva Chicago and Estudiantes de La Plata in the Primera División de Argentina.

Huerta, nicknamed "the lion", was a significant part of the 2006 championship team, but two major injuries kept him outside the pitch for almost two years. He re-appeared in 2008.

In 2009, he was part of the Estudiantes squad that won the Copa Libertadores 2009 championship, although his only contribution was a brief substitute appearance in their 3–0 win over Libertad in the group stage. After Estudiantes reinforced the midfield, Huerta asked for a transfer, and found a place in Chilean first division side San Luis Quillota.
