= Cristian Sánchez Prette =

Argentine footballer (born 1985)

Personal information
- Full name: Cristian Nicolás Sánchez Prette
- Date of birth: 10 May 1985 (age 41)
- Place of birth: Río Cuarto, Argentina
- Height: 1.75 m (5 ft 9 in)
- Position: Midfielder

Youth career
- Huracán

Senior career*
Years	Team	Apps	(Gls)
2003–2008	Huracán	115	(13)
2008–2012	CFR Cluj	2	(0)
2009	→ Estudiantes (loan)	12	(1)
2009–2010	→ Newell's Old Boys (loan)	18	(1)
2010	→ Barcelona S.C. (loan)	13	(0)
2011	→ Argentinos Juniors (loan)	5	(0)
2011–2013	→ Huracán (loan)	33	(1)
2014	Águila	12	(6)
2015	Tiro Federal	0	(0)
2015	Estudiantes de Río Cuarto	18	(2)
2016–2017	Berazategui	7	(1)
2018	CD Audaz		
- * Club domestic league appearances and goals

Cristian Nicolás Sánchez Prette (born 10 May 1985) is an Argentine former professional footballer who played as a midfielder.

== Career ==
Sánchez Prette was born in Río Cuarto. He came through the Club Atlético Huracán youth system to make his first team debut in 2003. He was part of the squad that obtained promotion to the Argentine First Division, and in the Apertura 2007 tournament he contributed a useful four goals, helping Huracán to finish in 7th place.

In May 2008 he agreed terms with Romanian club CFR Cluj for a fee of 1.100.000 euro, but returned to Argentina in January 2009 to join Estudiantes de La Plata on loan.

Sánchez Prette scored a number of significant goals for Estudiantes including 2 goals to help them qualify for the knockout phase of Copa Libertadores 2009 and a 94th-minute equaliser against local rivals Gimnasia y Esgrima de La Plata in the Clásico Platense. He was also part of the Copa Libertadores winning team despite not playing the final game against Cruzeiro.

During the winter transfer window CFR Cluj loaned Sánchez Prette to Newell's Old Boys. In July 2010, Sánchez Prette was signed by Barcelona S.C. on a one-year loan.

== Honours ==
Estudiantes de La Plata

- Copa Libertadores: 2009
