= Mauro Boselli =

Argentine footballer (born 1985)

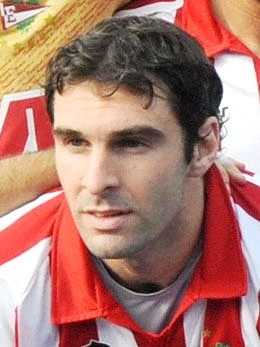
- Boselli with Estudiantes in 2010

Personal information
- Full name: Mauro Boselli
- Date of birth: 22 May 1985 (age 41)
- Place of birth: Buenos Aires, Argentina
- Height: 1.81 m (5 ft 11 in)
- Position: Forward

Youth career
- Sportivo Pereyra de Barracas
- All Boys
- 1999–2003: Boca Juniors

Senior career*
Years	Team	Apps	(Gls)
2003–2008	Boca Juniors	44	(10)
2005–2006	→ Málaga B (loan)	32	(5)
2008–2010	Estudiantes de LP	92	(49)
2010–2013	Wigan Athletic	15	(0)
2011	→ Genoa (loan)	7	(2)
2011–2012	→ Estudiantes (loan)	29	(11)
2013	→ Palermo (loan)	8	(0)
2013–2018	León	186	(105)
2019–2020	Corinthians	30	(7)
2021–2022	Cerro Porteño	31	(11)
2022–2023	Estudiantes	49	(23)

International career
	Argentina U-20	12	(0)
2009–2011	Argentina	4	(1)
- * Club domestic league appearances and goals as of 07:10, 25 May 2023 (UTC)

Mauro Boselli (born 22 May 1985) is an Argentine former professional footballer who played as a striker.

Boselli began his professional career with Boca Juniors. Over the course of two decades, he represented nine clubs across seven countries. His legacy is most closely tied to his three spells with Estudiantes in Argentina and his stint with León in Mexico.

Boselli won the Copa Libertadores twice, with Boca Juniors in 2007 and with Estudiantes in 2009, finishing as the tournament's top scorer in the latter year.

== Club career ==
=== Early career ===
Boselli began playing small sided football at Sportivo Pereyra de Barracas and then to the youth system of All Boys.

=== Boca Juniors ===
At the age of 11, Boselli entered the Boca Juniors youth teams. In 2002, Boselli went to Spain with Boca Juniors for a youth tournament and played the final before a game disputed between Bilbao and Roma, when Roma's coach Fabio Capello asked Boselli if he was Italian and if he held a community passport. At Boca Juniors, Boselli played in 30 reserve games before jumping to the first squad. In 2003, Boselli featured in the Boca Juniors under-20 side with Brazilian midfielder Eduardo Martins Nunes.

Boselli debuted in the first-team's pre-season when he was 16. Boselli made his debut for Boca Juniors in a 7–2 defeat to Rosario Central on 6 July 2003, for the last fixture of the 2003 Clausura. In this task, however, many youth team players made their presentation seeings as the starting squad were celebrating winning the 2003 Copa Libertadores days earlier.

In the club's 2004 under-20 side, Boselli shared the squad with teammates as Fernando Gago, Andrés Franzoia and Eduardo Casais. In 2004, Boselli formed a Boca Juniors winning team with Carlos Tevez, Guillermo Barros Schelotto, Pablo Ledesma, Diego Cagna, Sebastián Battaglia, Jonathan Fabbro, Rolando Schiavi, Roberto Abbondanzieri, youth graduate Neri Cardozo and Colombian Fabián Vargas.

In 2005, Boselli noted 2 goals in 11 appearances for the first-team. He did, though, share the team with Belgian player Mikael Yourassowsky.

==== Loan to Málaga ====
He subsequently spent the 2005–06 season on loan at Málaga B in the Spanish Segunda División, scoring 5 goals in 32 games. At Málaga, Boselli was one of three South American players in the team, including Peruvian Juan González-Vigil and Brazilian Tiago Marchiori.

==== 2006–2008 ====
After returning to Boca Juniors, Boselli struggled to become a regular in the first team, being behind Martín Palermo and Argentina 2006 FIFA World Cup player Rodrigo Palacio in the coaches' consideration. On 12 December 2007, Boselli came on as a substitute in the 90th minute for Rodrigo Palacio in Boca Juniors' 1-0 semi-final victory against Tunisian club Étoile Sportive du Sahel in the 2007 FIFA Club World Cup.

Whilst at Boca, the club rejected many loan offers and permanent signing deals, including from Lazio and Catania, always saying that Boselli was not for sale. Six months before departing Boca Juniors, Boselli signed a 4-year contract with the club.

Boselli's final game for Boca Juniors was a 6–2 victory against Tigre in the 2008 Torneo Clausura.

Boselli departed the club at the middle of 2008, disputing a total of 59 official games and starting in 21 of them.

=== Estudiantes ===
In July 2008, Estudiantes de La Plata bought 50% of Boselli's transfer rights from Boca, allowing the forward to move to the La Plata outfit. In Estudiantes, Boselli started strongly with 8 goals in 15 league games during his first tournament, the 2008 Apertura. In 2009, he won the Copa Libertadores with Estudiantes. During the competition, Boselli scored 8 goals, finishing as the overall top scorer of the tournament. He also helped the team by scoring the winning goal in the tournament's final against Cruzeiro, in Belo Horizonte. In total, Mauro Boselli scored 49 goals at Estudiantes de La Plata since June 2008. He hit 32 goals in the Argentine Primera División and a further 17 goals in international cups: 12 in the Copa Libertadores, four in the Copa Sudamericana and one in the FIFA Club World Cup. Boselli revealed that Estudiantes coach Alejandro Sabella prepared the squad for six months before playing against 2008/09 UEFA Champions League winners Barcelona, including 15 to 30 minute training sessions on the Tuesdays and Thursdays focusing on how Estudiantes was going to play against Barcelona.

=== Wigan Athletic ===
On 29 June 2010, Boselli signed a four-year deal with Wigan Athletic for an undisclosed fee. He made his debut in the opening game of the Premier League season against Blackpool, and scored his first competitive goal for the club against Swansea City in the League Cup on 26 October 2010. However, following his first goal for the club, Boselli found settling into the English Premier League difficult. In March 2012, Wigan fans voted Boselli as the club's worst ever foreigner.

=== Genoa ===
Having struggled to adapt to English football, Boselli was loaned to Italian Serie A side Genoa on 13 January 2011 for the remainder of the 2010–11 season. At Genoa, he teamed up with former Boca Juniors teammate Rodrigo Palacio. He made seven appearances and scored two goals for Genoa, including a match-winning goal in stoppage time against rival club U.C. Sampdoria.

=== Estudiantes ===
Before returning to Wigan from his season-long loan at Genoa, Boselli expressed interest in a permanent move to the Italian side. However, he later stated his main aim was to return to Argentina, and was subsequently loaned out to former club Estudiantes for the 2011–12 season. Boselli finished as the club's top goalscorer in both the Apertura and Clausura tournaments, featuring in 29 games and netting 11 goals.

=== Wigan ===
Boselli returned to Wigan after a year and a half on loan at two different clubs. He was issued the squad number 19 as Franco Di Santo had taken his original number 9 shirt. After appearing on the bench for the first two league games, briefly appearing away at Southampton in a 2–0 win as an 89th-minute substitute, Boselli returned to starting action by starting for Wigan in a League Cup tie away at Nottingham Forest. Boselli scored the first goal in a 4–1 victory and impressed during the night. It was his second ever goal for Wigan. On 25 September 2012 Boselli scored twice in a 4–1 win away at West Ham in the third round of the League Cup. On 15 January 2013, Boselli grabbed his 4th goal of the season in a 1–0 FA Cup Third Round Replay win away at Bournemouth.

=== Palermo ===
In the post match interview following the FA Cup game against Macclesfield on 26 January 2013, Wigan manager Roberto Martínez confirmed that Boselli had agreed to a further loan spell, this time back in Italy at Palermo. The move was finalized and officially confirmed by the Sicilian club two days later, on 28 January.

=== Club León ===
In June 2013, he moved to Club León in Mexico.

In his first game for Leon, Boselli scored a double, his first goals, in the Copa MX against Dorados. Three days later, he debuted in the Liga MX, scoring in a 2–1 victory against Atlas.

In December 2013, León became champion of Liga MX Apertura 2013, being a key player for the championship and most games played during the season.

Yet again, in the Clausura 2014, he was a key player the next year, when León became champions for the second year in a row making them the second Mexican team to become "bicampeones" in the 6 months modalilty tournament. (Also León won the first "bicampeón" in the 1950s, one year tournament). He is currently the club's second highest goalscorer in its entire history, with 130 goals scored in all competitions.

In 2018, whilst at Leon, Boselli reached marking 200 career goals. Boselli achieved two Liga MX titles for Leon.

=== Corinthians ===
In January 2019, he moved to Corinthians in Brazil.

For 2019, Boselli disputed 26 games, scored 8 goals and gave two assistances for Corinthians between the local tournament and the Copa Sudamericana, he also won the 2019 Paulista Championship.

=== Cerro Porteño ===
During the Paraguayan superclasico played in August 2021, Boselli scored for Cerro Porteño in a 3–0 victory against Olimpia Asunción.

In September 2021, Boselli departed to Argentina for family matters with permission from Cerro Porteño and was absent from the team, which resulting in the passing of his mother as communicated by the club. In the same month, Cerro Porteño confirmed Boselli's continuity at the club for 2022. This was automatically assured in Boselli's first contract, in reaching a quantity of games would assure a contract extension. This was automatically assured in Boselli's first contract, in reaching a quantity of games would assure a contract extension.

=== Estudiantes de LP ===
On 6 January 2022, Boselli joined Estudiantes de La Plata. On 2 November 2023, Boselli announced he would retire from professional football at the end of the season.

== International career ==
In 2005, Boselli was part of the Argentina U-20 national team that finished third in the South American Youth Championship (therefore qualifying for that year's U-20 World Cup). However, Boselli was not part of the final World Cup squad.

On 27 September 2009, Boselli was called for a local league-based Argentina national team (replacing injured Esteban Fuertes) to play a friendly match against Ghana. Three days later, on 30 September, Boselli debuted with the national team, being brought in as a substitute in the 57th minute of the match. Boselli scored his first goal for Argentina – a penalty kick – in a friendly match against Nigeria in Abuja on 1 June 2011, which ended in a 4–1 victory for Nigeria. The match became a cause celebre among the investigators of the FIFA Ethics Committee after it was discovered later that the match's referee, Ibrahim Chaibou of Niger, had been involved with Singaporean criminal Wilson Raj Perumal in match-fixing incidents in numerous international friendly matches.

== Personal life ==
After finishing secondary school, Boselli studied sports journalism for a year.

== Post-retirement ==
Boselli became a football agent.

== Career statistics ==
=== Club ===
As of 31 December 2021

Appearances and goals by club, season and competition
Club	Season	League			Cup		Continental		Other		Total	
Club	Season	Division	Apps	Goals	Apps	Goals	Apps	Goals	Apps	Goals	Apps	Goals
Boca Juniors	2002–03	Argentine Primera División	1	0	—		—		—		1	0
Boca Juniors	2003–04	Argentine Primera División	—		—		—		—		0	0
Boca Juniors	2004–05	Argentine Primera División	10	2	—		1	0	—		11	2
Boca Juniors	2006–07	Argentine Primera División	12	4	—		8	1	—		20	5
Boca Juniors	2007–08	Argentine Primera División	21	4	—		6	0	—		27	4
Boca Juniors	Total		44	10	0	0	15	1	0	0	59	11
Málaga B (loan)	2005–06	Segunda División	32	5	—		—		—		32	5
Estudiantes	2008–09	Argentine Primera División	25	10	—		25	12	—		50	22
Estudiantes	2009–10	Argentine Primera División	31	22	—		9	4	2 (Note: Appearance(s) in FIFA Club World Cup)	1	42	27
Estudiantes	Total		56	32	0	0	34	16	2	1	92	49
Wigan Athletic	2010–11	Premier League	8	0	4	1	—		—		12	1
Wigan Athletic	2012–13	Premier League	7	0	5	4	—		—		12	4
Wigan Athletic	Total		15	0	9	5	0	0	0	0	24	5
Genoa (loan)	2010–11	Serie A	7	2	0	0	—		—		7	2
Estudiantes (loan)	2011–12	Argentine Primera División	29	11	1	0	2	0	—		32	11
Palermo (loan)	2012–13	Serie A	8	0	0	0	—		—		8	0
León	2013–14	Liga MX	39	21	1	2	7	4	—		47	27
León	2014–15	Liga MX	26	15	—		2	1	—		28	16
León	2015–16	Liga MX	34	23	6	3	—		—		40	26
León	2016–17	Liga MX	36	19	7	4	—		—		43	23
León	2017–18	Liga MX	34	21	7	8	—		—		41	29
León	2018–19	Liga MX	17	6	5	3	—		—		22	9
León	Total		186	105	26	20	9	5	0	0	221	130
Corinthians	2019	Série A	22	7	8	1	4 (Note: Appearance(s) in Copa Sudamericana)	1	11 (Note: Appearance(s) in Campeonato Paulista)	1	45	10
Corinthians	2020	Série A	8	0	1	0	2 (Note: Appearance(s) in Copa Libertadores)	1	11	5	22	6
Corinthians	Total		30	7	9	1	6	2	22	6	67	16
Cerro Porteño	2021	Paraguayan Primera División	31	11	—		8	0	—		39	11
Career total			438	183	45	26	74	24	24	7	581	238

=== International goals ===
No.	Date	Venue	Opponent	Score	Result	Competition	Ref.
1.	1 June 2011	Abuja Stadium, Abuja	Nigeria	1–4	1–4	Friendly	

== Honours ==
Boca Juniors

- Copa Sudamericana: 2004
- Copa Libertadores: 2007

Estudiantes LP

- Copa Libertadores: 2009
- Copa Argentina: 2023
- FIFA Club World Cup runner-up: 2009

Wigan Athletic

- FA Cup: 2012–13

León

- Liga MX: Apertura 2013, Clausura 2014

Corinthians

- Campeonato Paulista: 2019

Individual

- Copa Libertadores top scorer: 2009 (with Estudiantes)
- Argentine Primera División top scorer: 2010 Clausura (with Estudiantes)
- Liga MX top scorer: Apertura 2013, Apertura 2014, Apertura 2015, Apertura 2017
- Liga MX Best XI: Apertura 2015, Apertura 2017
