= Maximiliano Núñez =

Argentine footballer

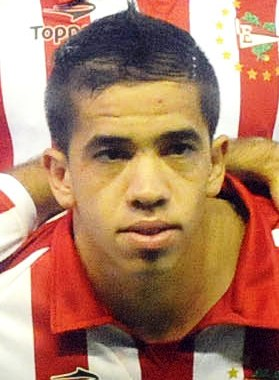
- Núñez with Estudiantes in 2010

Personal information
- Full name: Maximiliano Ezequiel Núñez
- Date of birth: September 17, 1986 (age 40)
- Place of birth: La Plata, Buenos Aires, Argentina
- Height: 1.69 m (5 ft 7 in)
- Position: Right winger

Team information
- Current team: Nacional Potosí
- Number: 19

Youth career
- Estudiantes LP

Senior career*
Years	Team	Apps	(Gls)
2007–2008	→ Temperley (loan)	33	(2)
2008–2013	Estudiantes LP	57	(6)
2011–2012	→ San Martín (SJ) (loan)	19	(1)
2013–2014	All Boys	9	(1)
2014–2015	Sporting Cristal	32	(9)
2015–2017	Millonarios	97	(7)
2018	Patronato	7	(0)
2018–2019	Atlético Bucaramanga	21	(3)
2019–2021	Defensores de Belgrano	19	(1)
2021	Gimnasia y Tiro	24	(0)
2022–2023	Nacional Potosi	62	(7)
2024–2025	Universitario Vinto	53	(7)
2025–	Nacional Potosí	16	(4)
- * Club domestic league appearances and goals as of 30 December 2025

Maximiliano Ezequiel Núñez (born September 17, 1986) is an Argentine football right winger who plays for Nacional Potosí.

== Career ==
Núñez played youth football at Estudiantes de La Plata, but was loaned to third division side Temperley in 2007, before debuting in Estudiantes' first team. In Temperley he played for one season, mainly as a forward.

Upon his return to Estudiantes, he made his Primera División debut starting in a 1–2 defeat to Racing on September 20, 2008, in the 2008 Apertura. He scored his first goal in a 5–1 victory over Independiente in the 2009 Clausura.

Núñez was part of Estudiantes' 2009 Copa Libertadores-winning squad, and was runner-up of the 2009 FIFA Club World Cup with the team. He started in the semifinals against Pohang Steelers and entered the field in the final against FC Barcelona. In 2010, the midfielder won his second title with Estudiantes, the 2010 Apertura of the Argentine Primera División. He played 4 games and scored 1 goal in the tournament.

Signed in July, 2011 for San Martín de San Juan one year on loan.

A six-month after playing for All Boys, Núñez agreed to join Peruvian side Sporting Cristal in December, 2013.

== Honours ==
Estudiantes

- Copa Libertadores: 2009
- Argentine Primera División: 2010 Apertura
