= Diego Galván =

Argentine footballer

Personal information
- Full name: Diego Alberto Galván
- Date of birth: 19 March 1982 (age 44)
- Place of birth: General Rodríguez, Buenos Aires, Argentina
- Height: 1.80 m (5 ft 11 in)
- Positions: Second striker; right winger

Senior career*
Years	Team	Apps	(Gls)
2000–2002	Lanús	18	(2)
2002	→ Morelia (loan)	13	(5)
2003	Beira-Mar	4	(0)
2003–2005	Olimpo	53	(14)
2005–2007	River Plate	24	(2)
2006	→ Estudiantes de La Plata (loan)	33	(5)
2007–2012	Estudiantes de La Plata	43	(4)
2009–2010	→ Arsenal de Sarandí (loan)	26	(4)
2010–2011	→ Olimpo (loan)	25	(5)
2012–2013	Unión	21	(1)
2013–2014	Estudiantes de Caseros	23	(2)
- * Club domestic league appearances and goals

Diego Alberto Galván (born 19 March 1982) is an Argentine footballer.

== Career ==
Galván started his career with Lanús in the Argentine Primera in 2000, he had a short spell with Mexican side Morelia before returning to Lanús. In 2003, he had a short spell with Beira-Mar in Portugal before returning to Argentina to play for Olimpo de Bahía Blanca between 2003 and 2005. After the relegation of Olimpo at the end of the 2004–2005 season, he was signed by Argentine giants River Plate. Galván did not succeed as expected in River and was transferred (on loan) to Estudiantes in 2006.

It was with Estudiantes de La Plata that he became a noted midfielder, and landed his first title when the team won the Apertura 2006. Per the conditions of the loan, Estudiantes had to pay US$100,000 to allow Galván to play against River Plate in that tournament.

Prior to the start of the 2007 Clausura, Galván returned to River Plate, but was not a starter for most of the tournament, and had some public disagreements with coach Daniel Passarella. Estudiantes applied for Galván's services again, and he was transferred back to the pincharratas (this time not on loan) in July 2007.

In a friendly match against Paraguayan side Libertad, played 29 July 2007, Galván made a wrong movement while disputing the ball and injuring his left knee (he was diagnosed with a ruptured anterior cruciate ligament). Galván missed seven months of play, and resumed playing (mostly as a substitute) in early 2008.

Since Estudiantes needs to field two teams (one for the local championship, and one for the 2008 Copa Libertadores, Galván received more progressively more play. In March 2008, he declared that he feels ready to play for up to 70 minutes per game. In 2009, he was part of the Estudiantes squad that won the Copa Libertadores championship.

After one season with Arsenal de Sarandí, Galván returned to Olimpo, on loan, for the 2010–11 Argentine Primera División season. He re-joined Estudiantes at the end of his loan period.

== Honours ==
Estudiantes de La Plata

- Argentine Primera División (1): 2006 Apertura
- Copa Libertadores (1): 2009
