= Rodrigo Braña =

Argentine footballer

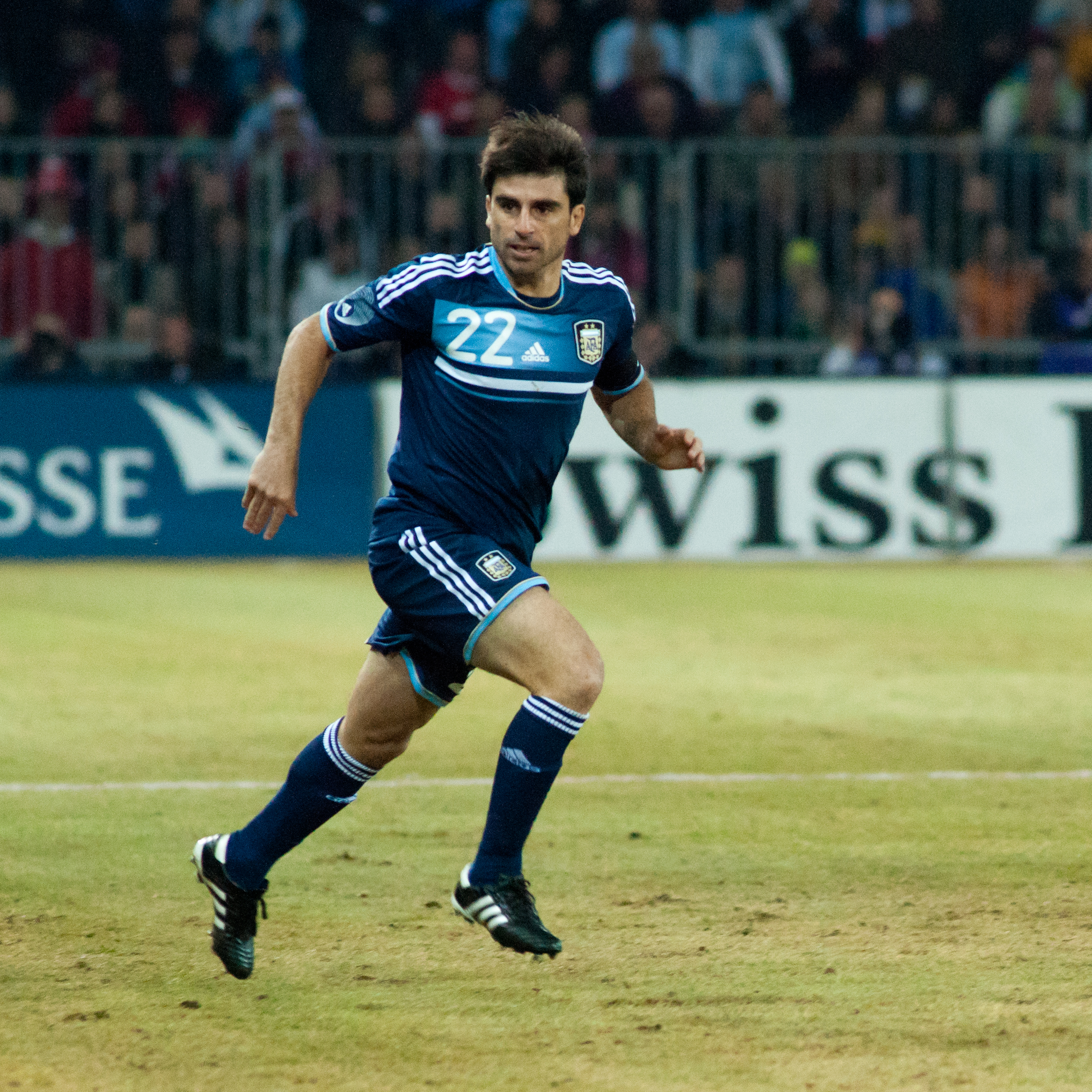
- Braña with Argentina in 2012

Personal information
- Full name: Rodrigo Braña
- Date of birth: March 7, 1979 (age 47)
- Place of birth: Berazategui, Argentina
- Height: 1.67 m (5 ft 6 in)
- Position: Defensive midfielder

Senior career*
Years	Team	Apps	(Gls)
1997–2004	Quilmes	158	(13)
1998–1999	→ Mallorca B (loan)	32	(0)
2001	→ Unión (loan)	13	(0)
2004–2013	Estudiantes LP	207	(8)
2013–2016	Quilmes	43	(0)
2016–2019	Estudiantes LP	45	(0)

International career
2009–2013	Argentina	9	(0)

Managerial career
- 2020: Estudiantes LP (caretaker)
- 2024–: Nueva Chicago
- * Club domestic league appearances and goals

Rodrigo Braña (born 7 March 1979) is an Argentine former professional footballer who played as a midfielder.

== Career ==
Braña started his career playing for Quilmes in the Primera B Nacional (Argentine second division). He has had three different spells with the club, which alternated between the second and the top division.

Braña had a short spell with RCD Mallorca in Spain where he played for their B team between 1998 and 1999. Braña also had a short spell with Argentine club Unión de Santa Fe in 2001.

In 2005, Braña joined Estudiantes, where he has become an idol for the La Plata club. The two biggest highlights of his career to date have been winning the Apertura 2006 and the Copa Libertadores 2009 with Estudiantes.

Braña was a key figure on the Estudiantes team that won its first Argentine League title in 23 years after a 2-1 playoff victory against Boca Juniors to decide the winner of the Apertura 2006 champions. "El Chapu" won many accolades for his contribution to the championship winning team; he was selected as the third best player of the Apertura 2006 tournament by Argentine sports newspaper Olé. The only players that finished above him in the list were teammates Mariano Pavone and Juan Sebastián Verón. He has formed a formidable partnership in the center of midfield with Veron in recent seasons.

In 2008, he formed part of the team that finished as runners-up in Copa Sudamericana 2008.

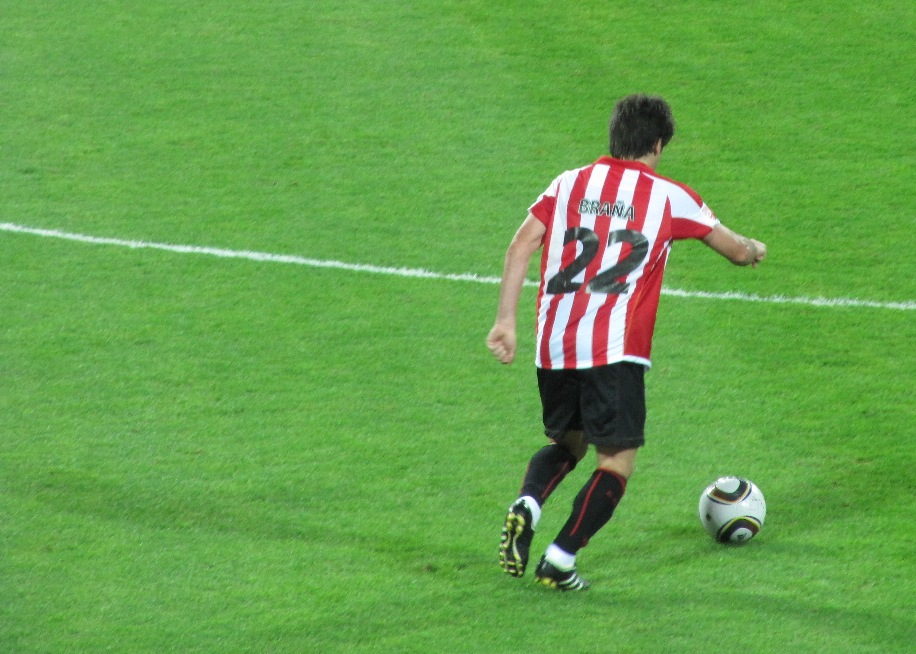
Braña during the 2009 FIFA Club World Cup.

Braña was then a regular player in the team that won Copa Libertadores 2009. His typical speed, stamina, and defensive skills in the midfield were key factors in Estudiantes' lifting the continental championship for the first time in 39 years.

After the Libertadores victory, he faced a serious offer from Mexican club Monterrey to take him to play in Mexico. Braña eventually decided to stay with Estudiantes, a decision that was rewarded with his first-ever call up to the Argentina national team on 1 September 2009.

Braña retired at the end of the 2018–19 season.

=== International appearances and goals ===
#	Date	Venue	Opponent	Final score	Goal	Result	Competition
1.	September 30, 2009	Córdoba, Argentina	Ghana	2–0	0	Win	Friendly
2.	October 7, 2011	Buenos Aires, Argentina	Chile	4–1	0	Win	2014 World Cup qualification
3.	November 15, 2011	Barranquilla, Colombia	Colombia	1–2	0	Win	2014 World Cup qualification
4.	September 19, 2012	Goiânia, Brazil	Brazil	1–2	0	Lose	Superclásico de las Américas
5.	October 3, 2012	Resistencia, Argentina	Brazil				Superclásico de las Américas

== Honors ==
Estudiantes

- Argentine Primera División (2): 2006 Apertura, 2010 Apertura
- Copa Libertadores (1): 2009
