= Leandro Benítez =

Argentine footballer and manager

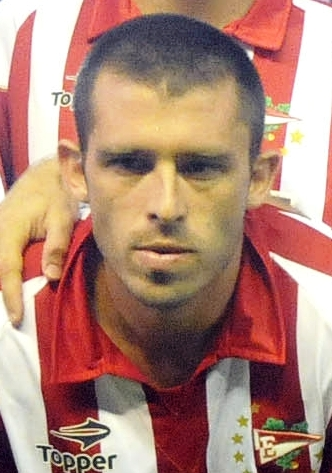
- Benítez with Estudiantes in 2010

Personal information
- Full name: Leandro Damián Benítez
- Date of birth: 5 April 1981 (age 45)
- Place of birth: Ensenada, Argentina
- Height: 1.80 m (5 ft 11 in)
- Position: Left winger

Youth career
- Estudiantes de La Plata

Senior career*
Years	Team	Apps	(Gls)
2000–2013	Estudiantes LP	247	(13)
2002–2004	→ Quilmes (loan)	85	(8)
2005–2006	→ Olimpo (loan)	28	(3)
2013–2014	Quilmes	18	(0)
2014–2015	Estudiantes	5	(0)
2015	Boca Unidos	11	(0)
2015–2016	Guaraní Antonio Franco	15	(0)
2016–2017	Everton La Plata		

Managerial career
- 2017–2018: Estudiantes II
- 2017: Estudiantes (caretaker)
- 2017: Estudiantes (caretaker)
- 2018: Estudiantes (caretaker)
- 2018–2019: Estudiantes
- * Club domestic league appearances and goals

Leandro Benítez (born 5 April 1981) is a retired Argentine footballer who usually played as a midfielder on the left side of the pitch.

== Career ==
A native of Ensenada, Benítez grew in the youth system of Estudiantes de La Plata, and in 2001 was loaned to Quilmes where he played two years, and then to Olimpo where he stayed another two years.

Back in Estudiantes since 2005, Benítez was part of the 2006 Apertura championship team. In 2008, he was runner up with the team in the Copa Sudamericana. Subsequently, he was a starter and key contributor on the team that won the 2009 Copa Libertadores. The midfielder played in 14 games, and scored 1 goal (against Nacional in the semifinal) during the tournament.

In the 2009 FIFA Club World Cup, Benítez scored twice in the semi-final against Pohang Steelers in a 2–1 win.

== Coaching career ==
After retiring, Benítez became the manager of Estudiantes's reserve team. On 14 June 2017, Benítez was appointed as caretaker manager of Estudiantes until the end of the season following the departure of Nelson Vivas. On 20 September 2017, he was once again appointed as the caretaker manager of the club, this time following the departure of Gustavo Matosas. He was in charge for one game, before a new manager was appointed nine days later. On 7 May 2018, he was again appointed as caretaker manager for the rest of the season after Lucas Bernardi resigned.

At the end of the season, he was appointed as the permanent manager of the club. On 24 February 2019, Benítez decided to resign after a period with poor results.

== Honours ==
Estudiantes

- Argentine Primera División (2): 2006 Apertura, 2010 Apertura
- Copa Libertadores (1): 2009
