= Leandro Desábato =

Argentine footballer (born 1979)

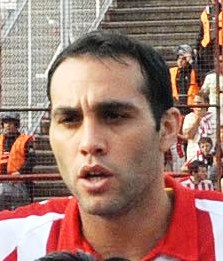
- Desábato in 2010

Personal information
- Full name: Leandro Desábato
- Date of birth: 24 January 1979 (age 47)
- Place of birth: Cafferata, Santa Fe, Argentina
- Height: 1.86 m (6 ft 1 in)
- Position: Centre back

Team information
- Current team: Almagro (manager)

Youth career
- Estudiantes LP

Senior career*
| Years | Team | Apps | (Gls) |
| 1997–2018 | Estudiantes LP | 407 | (20) |
| 2001–2002 | → Olimpo (loan) | 32 | (1) |
| 2002–2006 | → Quilmes (loan) | 101 | (5) |
| 2006–2007 | → Argentinos Juniors (loan) | 34 | (4) |

International career
| 2011–2012 | Argentina | 5 | (0) |

Managerial career
- 2020: Estudiantes LP (caretaker)
- 2020: Estudiantes LP
- 2023–: Almagro
- * Club domestic league appearances and goals

Leandro Desábato (born 24 January 1979), nicknamed Chavo, is an Argentine football manager and former player. He is the manager of Almagro.

== Club career ==
Desábato began his professional career in 1997 playing for Estudiantes de La Plata. In 2001, he joined Olimpo and after one season with the club he moved on to play for Quilmes. With both teams he won promotion from the Primera B Nacional (Argentine second division) to the Primera División (first).

In a 2005 Copa Libertadores match, Desábato allegedly racially insulted São Paulo's player Grafite. Desábato was arrested after the match. Following his night in jail, Desábato was defended by columnist and former Brazilian international footballer Tostão who stated that the insults were not racist, simply the kind of provocation that has always existed in football.

Desábato left Quilmes in 2006 to join Argentinos Juniors and after a successful season with the club he returned to Estudiantes de La Plata. During the second half of 2008, he was a regular first team player for Estudiantes in their Copa Sudamericana campaign, where they reached the final.

Desábato was a key figure in Estudiantes' 2009 Copa Libertadores championship. He was the only outfield player on the team to play in every minute of every game during the team's run through the tournament, even as his center-back partners changed around him (from Agustín Alayes to Cristian Cellay to Rolando Schiavi).

In 2009 Desábato was chosen in a traditional journalist poll conducted by El País in the South American Team of the Year.

== Personal life ==
Desábato's cousins, Andrés and Leandro Luis, are fellow footballers.

== Honours ==
Olimpo

- Primera B Nacional: 2001–02

Estudiantes

- Copa Libertadores: 2009
- Argentine Primera División: 2010 Apertura
