= 2006–07 Argentine Primera División =

116th season of top-tier football league in Argentina

Primera División
- Season: 2006–07
- Champions: Apertura: Estudiantes (LP) (5th title); Clausura: San Lorenzo (14th title)

The 2006–07 Argentina Primera División was the 116th season of first division football in Argentina. Estudiantes (LP) won the Torneo Apertura and San Lorenzo won the Torneo Clausura.

Godoy Cruz, Nueva Chicago, and Belgrano were promoted from the 2005–06 Primera B Nacional.

At the end of the season, Belgrano and Quilmes were directly relegated to the Primera B Nacional and Huracán and Tigre promoted from Primera B Nacional after winning the relegation playoff against Godoy Cruz and Nueva Chicago respectively. Therefore, a total of four teams were relegated to the second division.

== Torneo Apertura ==
2006 Apertura
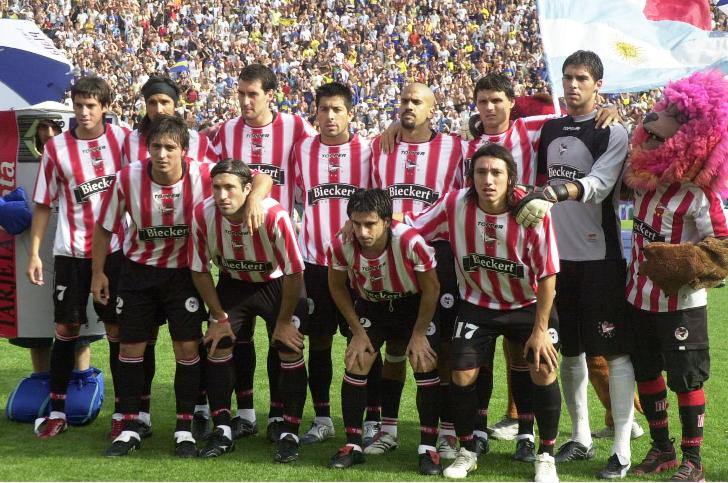
- Estudiantes (LP), champions
- Season: 2006–07
- Champions: Estudiantes (LP) (5th title)
- Promoted: Godoy Cruz; Nueva Chicago; Belgrano
- Top goalscorer: (Argentina) Rodrigo Palacio (Boca Juniors) (Argentina) Mauro Zárate (Vélez) (12 goals each)
- Biggest away win: San Lorenzo 1–7 Boca Juniors (25 Aug 2006)
- Highest scoring: San Lorenzo 1–7 Boca Juniors (25 Aug 2006)

Pos	Team	Pld	W	D	L	GF	GA	GD	Pts	Qualification
1	Estudiantes (LP)	19	14	2	3	35	12	+23	44	Championship playoff 2008 Copa Libertadores Second Stage
2	Boca Juniors	19	14	2	3	41	17	+24	44	Championship playoff
3	River Plate	19	11	5	3	33	17	+16	38	
4	Independiente	19	10	2	7	33	24	+9	32	
5	Arsenal	19	9	5	5	26	22	+4	32	
6	Lanús	19	9	4	6	26	24	+2	31	
7	Vélez Sarsfield	19	8	6	5	25	18	+7	30	
8	Rosario Central	19	8	4	7	28	22	+6	28	
9	San Lorenzo	19	8	4	7	30	33	−3	28	
10	Racing	19	7	5	7	22	19	+3	26	
11	Gimnasia y Esgrima (J)	19	8	2	9	19	19	0	26	
12	Belgrano	19	6	5	8	18	24	−6	23	
13	Gimnasia y Esgrima (LP)	19	7	2	10	21	40	−19	23	
14	Nueva Chicago	19	6	4	9	20	32	−12	22	
15	Banfield	19	4	8	7	21	26	−5	20	
16	Argentinos Juniors	19	5	5	9	22	28	−6	20	
17	Colón	19	5	3	11	20	34	−14	18	
18	Godoy Cruz	19	3	8	8	19	26	−7	17	
19	Newell's Old Boys	19	3	7	9	21	28	−7	16	
20	Quilmes	19	2	3	14	23	38	−15	9	

Source: AFA
Rules for classification: 1st points; 2nd goal difference; 3rd goals scored; 4th head-to-head points; 5th head-to-head goal difference; 6th head-to-head goals scored. This does not apply to determining the champion. If two or more teams are tied in point at the end of the tournament, a playoff will be held at a neutral venue within 72 hours for the championship

=== Championship playoff ===
Boca Juniors and Estudiantes LP ended up tied in points at the end of the 19 weeks of regular season. Tournament rules establish that, unlike any other position on the table, if two or more teams are equal in points at the end of play, goal difference does not count and a playoff game is required. Estudiantes won that match and was crowned as champion.

Series	Team 1	Team 2	Sco.	Venue	City
Final	Estudiantes LP	Boca Juniors	2–1	José Amalfitani Stadium	Buenos Aires

=== Top scorers ===
Position	Player	Team	Goals
1	Rodrigo Palacio	Boca Juniors	12
1	Mauro Zárate	Vélez Sársfield	12
3	Óscar Cardozo	Newell's Old Boys	11
3	Martín Palermo	Boca Juniors	11
3	Mariano Pavone	Estudiantes	11
6	Federico Higuaín	Nueva Chicago	10
6	Daniel Montenegro	Independiente	10
8	Claudio Graf	Lanús	9
8	Santiago Silva	Gimnasia (La Plata)	9
10	Gonzalo Higuaín	River Plate	8
10	Leonel Núñez	Argentinos Juniors	8
10	Facundo Sava	Racing	8
10	Néstor Silvera	San Lorenzo	8

== Torneo Clausura ==
2007 Clausura
- Season: 2006–07
- Champions: San Lorenzo (14th title)
- Relegated: Belgrano; Quilmes; Nueva Chicago; Godoy Cruz
- 2008 Copa Libertadores: Boca Juniors; Estudiantes (LP); San Lorenzo; River Plate; Arsenal; Lanús
- Top goalscorer: (Argentina) Martín Palermo (Boca Juniors), (11 goals)

By matchday 8, seven coaches had already been fired by their respective teams.

Pos	Team	Pld	W	D	L	GF	GA	GD	Pts	Qualification
1	San Lorenzo	19	14	3	2	34	17	+17	45	2008 Copa Libertadores Second Stage
2	Boca Juniors	19	11	6	2	38	20	+18	39	
3	Estudiantes (LP)	19	10	7	2	28	17	+11	37	
4	River Plate	19	9	6	4	26	17	+9	33	
5	Arsenal	19	8	6	5	31	24	+7	30	
6	Lanús	19	7	7	5	24	19	+5	28	
7	Colón	19	7	7	5	28	24	+4	28	
8	Argentinos Juniors	19	6	8	5	21	17	+4	26	
9	Vélez Sarsfield	19	7	5	7	22	26	−4	26	
10	Godoy Cruz	19	7	4	8	24	22	+2	25	
11	Independiente	19	6	7	6	23	24	−1	25	
12	Rosario Central	19	7	3	9	17	21	−4	24	
13	Racing	19	5	8	6	28	30	−2	23	
14	Newell's Old Boys	19	6	4	9	22	30	−8	22	
15	Nueva Chicago	19	5	6	8	19	28	−9	21	
16	Banfield	19	5	4	10	22	30	−8	19	
17	Belgrano	19	4	6	9	24	27	−3	18	
18	Gimnasia y Esgrima (LP)	19	4	5	10	19	28	−9	17	
19	Gimnasia y Esgrima (J)	19	4	5	10	11	22	−11	17	
20	Quilmes	19	3	3	13	18	36	−18	12	

Source: AFA
Rules for classification: 1st points; 2nd goal difference; 3rd goals scored; 4th head-to-head points; 5th head-to-head goal difference; 6th head-to-head goals scored. This does not apply to determining the champion. If two or more teams are tied in point at the end of the tournament, a playoff will be held at a neutral venue within 72 hours for the championship

=== Top scorers ===
Position	Player	Team	Goals
1	Martín Palermo	Boca Juniors	11
2	Óscar Cardozo	Newell's Old Boys	10
3	Gastón Fernández	San Lorenzo	9
4	Facundo Sava	Racing	8
4	Darío Cvitanich	Banfield	8
5	Carlos Luna	Quilmes	7
5	Rodrigo Palacio	Boca Juniors	7
5	Mariano Pavone	Estudiantes	7
5	José Sand	Colón	7

== Relegation ==
Pos	Team	2004–05 Pts	2005–06 Pts	2006–07 Pts	Total Pts	Total Pld	Avg	Relegation
1	Boca Juniors	48	83	83	214	114	1.877	
2	Estudiantes (LP)	61	52	81	194	114	1.702	
3	River Plate	60	62	71	193	114	1.693	
4	Vélez Sarsfield	73	58	56	187	114	1.64	
5	San Lorenzo	52	56	73	181	114	1.588	
6	Lanús	54	58	59	171	114	1.5	
7	Gimnasia y Esgrima (LP)	54	69	40	163	114	1.43	
8	Independiente	49	55	57	161	114	1.412	
9	Arsenal	54	44	62	160	114	1.404	
10	Rosario Central	61	45	52	158	114	1.386	
11	Banfield	59	59	39	157	114	1.377	
12	Racing	58	44	49	151	114	1.325	
13	Newell's Old Boys	60	51	38	149	114	1.307	
14	Colón	53	46	46	145	114	1.272	
15	Gimnasia y Esgrima (J)	—	51	43	94	76	1.237	
16	Argentinos Juniors	43	50	46	139	114	1.219	
17	Nueva Chicago	—	—	43	43	38	1.132	Relegation Playoff Matches
18	Godoy Cruz	—	—	42	42	38	1.105	Relegation Playoff Matches
19	Belgrano	—	—	41	41	38	1.079	Relegated to the Primera B Nacional
20	Quilmes	44	39	21	104	114	0.912	Relegated to the Primera B Nacional

Updated as of June 22, 2008; Source:AFA

=== Promotion playoff ===
Team 1	Agg.	Team 2	1st leg	2nd leg
Relegation/promotion playoff 1
Tigre	3–1	Nueva Chicago	1–0	2–1
Relegation/promotion playoff 2
Huracán	5–2	Godoy Cruz	2–0	3–2

- Huracán was promoted to 2007–08 Primera División by winning the playoff and Godoy Cruz was relegated to 2007–08 Primera B Nacional.
- Tigre was promoted to 2007–08 Primera División by winning the playoff and Nueva Chicago was relegated to 2007–08 Primera B Nacional.

== See also ==
- 2006–07 in Argentine football
