= Christian Cellay =

Argentine football defender (born 1981)

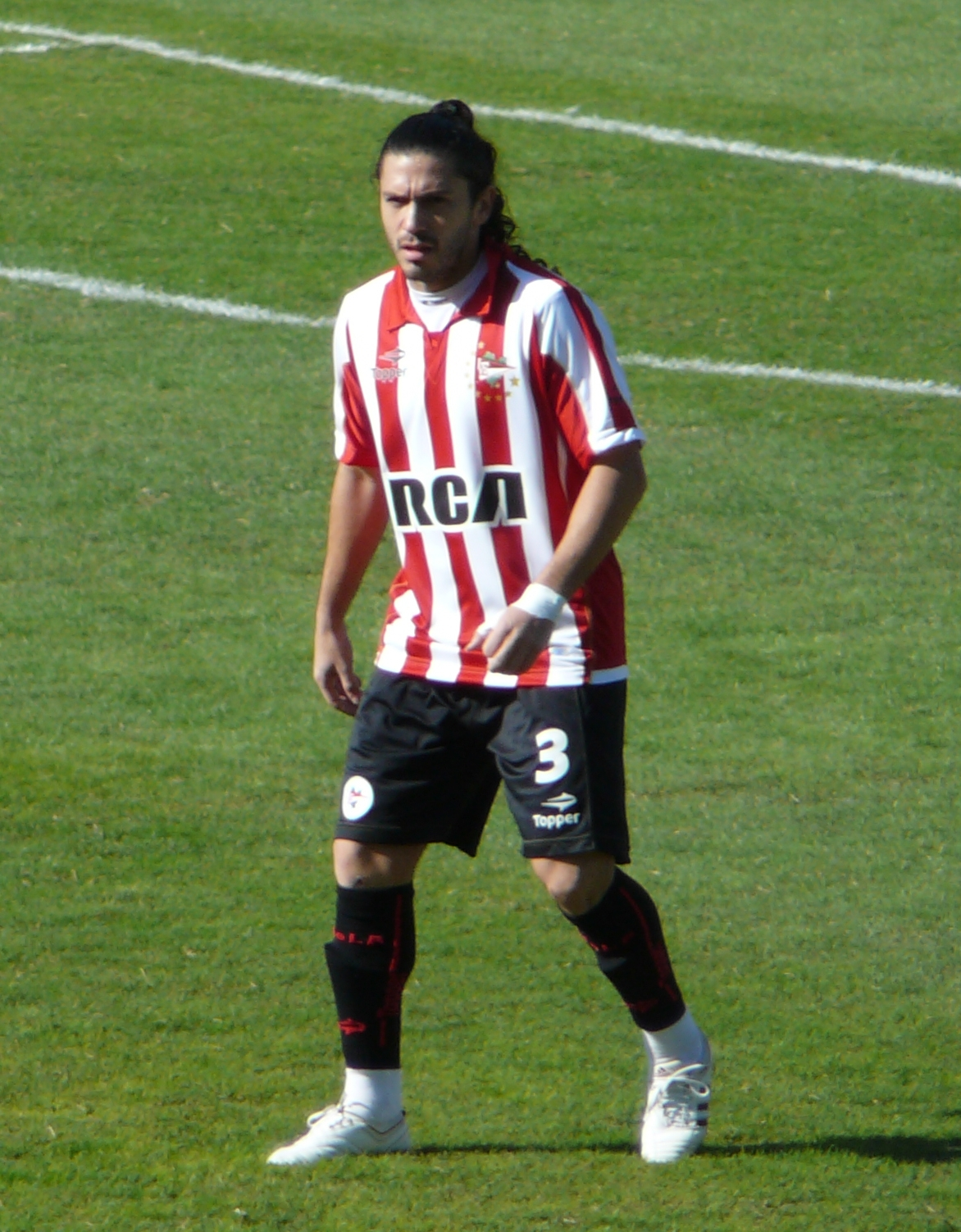
- Cellay with Estudiantes in 2010

Personal information
- Full name: Christian Ariel Cellay
- Date of birth: September 5, 1981 (age 45)
- Place of birth: Buenos Aires, Argentina
- Height: 1.72 m (5 ft 8 in)
- Positions: Centre back; full back

Team information
- Current team: UE Sant Julià
- Number: 3

Senior career*
Years	Team	Apps	(Gls)
1999–2008	Huracán	147	(9)
2008–2010	Estudiantes	51	(4)
2010–2013	Boca Juniors	31	(2)
2011–2012	→ Estudiantes (loan)	24	(2)
2014–2015	Rangers	7	(0)
2015–2016	Mushuc Runa	34	(4)
2016–2017	Gimnasia de Jujuy	4	(1)
2017	UE Sant Julià	6	(0)
2017–2019	UE Engordany	39	(5)
2019–2021	UE Sant Julià	23	(1)
2021-2023	UE Engordany	10	(3)

International career
2011	Argentina	2	(0)
- * Club domestic league appearances and goals as of 02 February 2016

Christian Ariel Cellay (born September 5, 1981) is an Argentine former football player, who played as a defender. He is currently president of UE Engordany.

== Career ==
Cellay started his professional career with Huracán where he made 147 league appearances. He transferred to Estudiantes de La Plata in 2008. In 2009, he won the 2009 Copa Libertadores championship with Estudiantes.

In June 2010, Cellay was bought by Boca Juniors for US$2 million fee, plus the loan of Facundo Roncaglia.

On 29 January 2014, was reported that Cellay joined Primera División club Rangers of Chile. However, he failed to continue at Maule Region team after their relegation to second-tier and was linked with a move to Paraguayan sides of Olimpia and Sol de América.

After playing in Ecuador for a season in the Mushuc Runa club Cellay moved to the second tier of the Argentinean football system as player of Gimnasia de Jujuy. Christian Cellay signed in 2017 by UE Sant Julià of Andorra in the European football.

=== International appearances and goals ===
#	Date	Venue	Opponent	Final score	Goal	Result	Competition
1.	September 14, 2011	Córdoba, Argentina	Brazil	0–0	0	Draw	2011 Roca Cup.
2.	September 28, 2011	Belém, Brazil	Brazil	2–0	0	Lost	2011 Roca Cup.

== Honours ==
=== Club ===
Huracán

- Primera B Nacional (1): 1999–00

Estudiantes de La Plata

- Copa Libertadores (1): 2009

Boca Juniors

- Torneo Apertura (1): 2011
- Copa Argentina (1): 2012
