= 2009 Copa Libertadores Second Stage =

The Second Stage of the 2009 Copa Santander Libertadores was a group stage. It was played from February 10 to April 30.

== Format ==
Twenty-six teams qualified directly into this round, plus six that advanced from the First Stage. This brings the total number of teams in the Second Stage to 32. The teams were drawn into eight groups of four. The teams in each group will play each other in a double round-robin format, playing the other teams in the group once at home and once away. Teams will be awarded 3 points for a win, 1 point for a draw, and 0 points for a loss. The following criteria will be used for breaking ties on points:

1. Goal difference
2. Goals scored
3. Away goals
4. Draw

The top two teams from each group advance to the Round of 16.

== Groups ==
=== Group 1 ===
Pos	Team	Pld	W	D	L	GF	GA	GD	Pts	(Brazil) RFE	(Brazil) PAL	(Chile) CC	(Ecuador) LDU
1	(Brazil) Sport Recife	6	4	1	1	10	7	+3	13	—	0–2	2–1	2–0
2	(Brazil) Palmeiras	6	3	1	2	9	7	+2	10	1–1	—	1–3	2–0
3	(Chile) Colo-Colo	6	2	1	3	9	7	+2	7	1–2	0–1	—	3–0
4	(Ecuador) LDU Quito	6	1	1	4	6	13	−7	4	2–3	3–2	1–1	—

Legend: Blue = home team win; Yellow = draw; Red = away team win.
February 17, 2009
17:00 UTC−05:00

LDU Quito (Ecuador)	3–2	(Brazil) Palmeiras
W. Calderón 23', 34'; Manso 58'	Report	Willians 28'; Edmílson 46'

Estadio de LDU (La Casa Blanca), Quito
Referee: Wilmar Roldán (Colombia)

February 18, 2009
21:50 UTC−03:00

Colo-Colo (Chile)	1–2	(Brazil) Sport Recife
Barrios 70'	Report	Ciro 7'; Wilson 44'

Estadio Monumental David Arellano, Santiago
Attendance: 23,427
Referee: Saúl Laverni (Argentina)

March 3, 2009
20:00 UTC−03:00

Palmeiras (Brazil)	1–3	(Chile) Colo-Colo
Keirrison 73'	Report	Barrios 43'; Torres 53'; González 79'

Estádio Palestra Itália (Parque Antarctica), São Paulo
Attendance: 23,285
Referee: Sergio Pezzotta (Argentina)

March 4, 2009
21:50 UTC−03:00

Sport Recife (Brazil)	2–0	(Ecuador) LDU Quito
Daniel 13'; Paulo Baier 72' (pen.)	Report

Estádio Adelmar da Costa Carvalho (Ilha do Retiro), Recife
Attendance: 20,184
Referee: Jorge Larrionda (Uruguay)

March 12, 2009
21:15 UTC−04:00

Colo-Colo (Chile)	3–0	(Ecuador) LDU Quito
Carranza 56'; Cereceda 61'; Barrios 65'	Report

Estadio Monumental David Arellano, Santiago
Referee: Carlos Amarilla (Paraguay)

April 8, 2009
21:50 UTC−03:00

Sport Recife (Brazil)	0–2	(Brazil) Palmeiras
	Report	Keirrison 24'; Diego Souza 73'

Estádio Adelmar da Costa Carvalho (Ilha do Retiro), Recife
Referee: Carlos Torres (Paraguay)

April 9, 2009
15:00 UTC−05:00

LDU Quito (Ecuador)	1–1	(Chile) Colo-Colo
Campos 48'	Report	Bieler 90+2' (o.g.)

Estadio de LDU (La Casa Blanca), Quito
Referee: Armando Archundia (Mexico)

April 15, 2009
19:45 UTC−03:00

Palmeiras (Brazil)	1–1	(Brazil) Sport Recife
Keirrison 14' (pen.)	Report	Wilson 45'

Estádio Palestra Itália (Parque Antarctica), São Paulo
Attendance: 22,372
Referee: Roberto Silvera (Uruguay)

April 21, 2009
20:15 UTC−03:00

Palmeiras (Brazil)	2–0	(Ecuador) LDU Quito
Marcão 48'; Diego Souza 83'	Report

Estádio Palestra Itália (Parque Antarctica), São Paulo
Attendance: 19,205
Referee: Jorge Larrionda (Uruguay)

April 22, 2009
21:50 UTC−03:00

Sport Recife (Brazil)	2–1	(Chile) Colo-Colo
Moacir 60'; Vandinho 75'	Report	Millar 50'

Estádio Adelmar da Costa Carvalho (Ilha do Retiro), Recife
Attendance: 20,050
Referee: Héctor Baldassi (Argentina)

April 29, 2009
19:50 UTC−05:00

LDU Quito (Ecuador)	2–3	(Brazil) Sport Recife
Espínola 2'; D. Vera 41'	Report	Andrade 23', 77'; Igor 58'

Estadio de LDU (La Casa Blanca), Quito
Referee: Juan Soto (Venezuela)

April 29, 2009
20:50 UTC−04:00

Colo-Colo (Chile)	0–1	(Brazil) Palmeiras
	Report	Cleiton Xavier 87'

Estadio Monumental David Arellano, Santiago
Attendance: 31,038
Referee: Carlos Torres (Paraguay)

=== Group 2 ===
Pos	Team	Pld	W	D	L	GF	GA	GD	Pts	(Argentina) BOC	(Ecuador) CUE	(Venezuela) TÁC	(Paraguay) GDL
1	(Argentina) Boca Juniors	6	5	0	1	11	3	+8	15	—	1–0	3–0	3–1
2	(Ecuador) Deportivo Cuenca	6	3	1	2	9	4	+5	10	1–0	—	3–1	4–0
3	(Venezuela) Deportivo Táchira	6	3	0	3	6	9	−3	9	0–1	1–0	—	2–1
4	(Paraguay) Guaraní	6	0	1	5	5	15	−10	1	1–3	1–1	1–2	—

Legend: Blue = home team win; Yellow = draw; Red = away team win.
February 10, 2009
18:00 UTC−04:00

Guaraní (Paraguay)	1–2	(Venezuela) Deportivo Táchira
Chávez 37'	Report	Chacón 40'; Pérez Greco 79'

Estadio General Pablo Rojas, Asunción
Referee: Diego Abal (Argentina)

February 17, 2009
22:15 UTC−03:00

Boca Juniors (Argentina)	1–0	(Ecuador) Deportivo Cuenca
Palacio 12'	Report

Estadio Alberto J. Armando (La Bombonera), Buenos Aires
Attendance: 50,328
Referee: Paulo César de Oliveira (Brazil)

February 24, 2009
18:15 UTC−05:00

Deportivo Cuenca (Ecuador)	4–0	(Paraguay) Guaraní
Teixeira 45'; Granda 61'; Villalba 74'; Cordero 82'	Report

Estadio Alejandro Serrano Aguilar, Cuenca
Referee: Juan Soto (Venezuela)

March 4, 2009
18:00 UTC−04:30

Deportivo Táchira (Venezuela)	0–1	(Argentina) Boca Juniors
	Report	Figueroa 87'

Estadio Pueblo Nuevo, San Cristóbal
Referee: Víctor Hugo Rivera (Peru)

March 11, 2009
20:20 UTC−04:30

Deportivo Táchira (Venezuela)	1–0	(Ecuador) Deportivo Cuenca
Villafraz 66'	Report

Estadio Pueblo Nuevo, San Cristóbal
Referee: Albert Duarte (Colombia)

March 17, 2009
18:45 UTC−05:00

Deportivo Cuenca (Ecuador)	3–1	(Venezuela) Deportivo Táchira
Granda 18'; Teixeira 39', 67'	Report	Villafraz 76'

Estadio Alejandro Serrano Aguilar, Cuenca
Referee: Raúl Orosco (Bolivia)

March 18, 2009
20:50 UTC−04:00

Guaraní (Paraguay)	1–3	(Argentina) Boca Juniors
Lima Negreiros 36'	Report	Riquelme 65' (pen.); Palermo 76'; Palacio 85'

Estadio Manuel Ferreira, Asunción
Attendance: 5,927
Referee: Enrique Osses (Chile)

April 9, 2009
21:30 UTC−03:00

Boca Juniors (Argentina)	3–1	(Paraguay) Guaraní
Palermo 33'; Palacio 36'; Riquelme 85' (pen.)	Report	Paniagua 44'

Estadio Alberto J. Armando (La Bombonera), Buenos Aires
Attendance: 22,651
Referee: Víctor Hugo Rivera (Peru)

April 16, 2009
20:00 UTC−04:30

Deportivo Táchira (Venezuela)	2–1	(Paraguay) Guaraní
Del Valle 68'; Fernández 75'	Report	Neumann 18'

Estadio Pueblo Nuevo, San Cristóbal
Referee: Víctor Hugo Carrillo (Peru)

April 23, 2009
18:00 UTC−05:00

Deportivo Cuenca (Ecuador)	1–0	(Argentina) Boca Juniors
Preciado 77'	Report

Estadio Alejandro Serrano Aguilar, Cuenca
Referee: José Buitrago (Colombia)

April 30, 2009
18:15 UTC−04:00

Guaraní (Paraguay)	1–1	(Ecuador) Deportivo Cuenca
Díaz 55'	Report	Teixeira Pereira 2'

Estadio Manuel Ferreira, Asunción
Referee: Ricardo Marques (Brazil)

April 30, 2009
19:15 UTC−03:00

Boca Juniors (Argentina)	3–0	(Venezuela) Deportivo Táchira
Palermo 13', 63'; Palacio 80'	Report

Estadio Alberto J. Armando (La Bombonera), Buenos Aires
Referee: Wilson Seneme (Brazil)

=== Group 3 ===
Pos	Team	Pld	W	D	L	GF	GA	GD	Pts	(Uruguay) NAC	(Peru) USM	(Argentina) RIV	(Paraguay) NPR
1	(Uruguay) Nacional	6	4	2	0	12	3	+9	14	—	2–1	3–0	3–1
2	(Peru) Universidad San Martín	6	2	2	2	7	9	−2	8	1–1	—	2–1	2–1
3	(Argentina) River Plate	6	2	1	3	7	9	−2	7	0–0	3–0	—	1–0
4	(Paraguay) Nacional	6	1	1	4	7	12	−5	4	0–3	1–1	4–2	—

Legend: Blue = home team win; Yellow = draw; Red = away team win.
February 12, 2009
19:00 UTC−03:00

Nacional (Uruguay)	2–1	(Peru) Universidad San Martín
Domínguez 30'; Lodeiro 90'	Report	Arzuaga 39'

Estadio Gran Parque Central, Montevideo
Attendance: 11,518
Referee: Carlos Chandía (Chile)

February 12, 2009
21:15 UTC−03:00

River Plate (Argentina)	1–0	(Paraguay) Nacional
Buonanotte 90'	Report

Estadio Antonio V. Liberti (El Monumental), Buenos Aires
Attendance: 17,673
Referee: Heber Lopes (Brazil)

February 18, 2009
19:30 UTC−04:00

Nacional (Paraguay)	0–3	(Uruguay) Nacional
	Report	Fernández 9'; Lodeiro 38'; Mondaini 64'

Estadio General Pablo Rojas, Asunción
Attendance: 1,307
Referee: Leonardo Gaciba (Brazil)

March 5, 2009
19:15 UTC−05:00

Universidad San Martín (Peru)	2–1	(Argentina) River Plate
Díaz 37' (pen.); Ludueña 55'	Report	Falcao 68'

Estadio Monumental, Lima
Referee: José Buitrago (Colombia)

March 12, 2009
17:00 UTC−05:00

Universidad San Martín (Peru)	2–1	(Paraguay) Nacional
García 53', 58'	Report	Arriola 74'

Estadio Alejandro Villanueva, Lima
Referee: Enrique Osses (Chile)

March 19, 2009
21:45 UTC−03:00

Nacional (Uruguay)	3–0	(Argentina) River Plate
Fernández 40'; Lodeiro 73'; Victorino 90+5'	Report

Estadio Centenario, Montevideo
Attendance: 47,571
Referee: Carlos Chandía (Chile)

April 7, 2009
18:00 UTC−04:00

Nacional (Paraguay)	1–1	(Peru) Universidad San Martín
Escobar 67'	Report	Arzuaga 41'

Estadio General Pablo Rojas, Asunción
Attendance: 193
Referee: Paulo César de Oliveira (Brazil)

April 7, 2009
21:15 UTC−03:00

River Plate (Argentina)	0–0	(Uruguay) Nacional
	Report

Estadio Antonio V. Liberti (El Monumental), Buenos Aires
Referee: Salvio Fagundes (Brazil)

April 21, 2009
20:30 UTC−05:00

Universidad San Martín (Peru)	1–1	(Uruguay) Nacional
Ludueña 88'	Report	Mondaini 74'

Estadio Alejandro Villanueva, Lima
Referee: Carlos Simon (Brazil)

April 23, 2009
21:15 UTC−04:00

Nacional (Paraguay)	4–2	(Argentina) River Plate
Escobar 48' (pen.); Núñez 66', 79'; Ruiz Peralta 74'	Report	Falcao 44' (pen.); Gallardo 82'

Estadio Defensores del Chaco, Asunción
Referee: Leonardo Gaciba (Brazil)

April 30, 2009
21:30 UTC−03:00

Nacional (Uruguay)	3–1	(Paraguay) Nacional
Arismendi 29'; Coates 80'; Lodeiro 90+1'	Report	Núñez 9'

Estadio Centenario, Montevideo
Referee: René Ortubé (Bolivia)

April 30, 2009
21:30 UTC−03:00

River Plate (Argentina)	3–0	(Peru) Universidad San Martín
Bou 17'; Sambueza 41'; Barrado 60'	Report

Estadio Antonio V. Liberti (El Monumental), Buenos Aires
Referee: Carlos Amarilla (Paraguay)

=== Group 4 ===
Pos	Team	Pld	W	D	L	GF	GA	GD	Pts	(Brazil) SPO	(Uruguay) DEF	(Colombia) DIM	(Colombia) AMC
1	(Brazil) São Paulo	6	4	1	1	10	6	+4	13	—	2–1	1–1	2–1
2	(Uruguay) Defensor Sporting	6	2	2	2	5	5	0	8	0–1	—	4–3	1–0
3	(Colombia) Independiente Medellín	6	1	4	1	6	6	0	7	2–1	0–0	—	0–0
4	(Colombia) América de Cali	6	0	3	3	3	7	−4	3	1–3	0–0	1–1	—

Legend: Blue = home team win; Yellow = draw; Red = away team win.
February 10, 2009
21:15 UTC−03:00

Defensor Sporting (Uruguay)	1–0	(Colombia) América de Cali
Gaglianone 38'	Report

Estadio Centenario, Montevideo
Attendance: 12,734
Referee: Enrique Osses (Chile)

February 18, 2009
21:50 UTC−03:00

São Paulo (Brazil)	1–1	(Colombia) Independiente Medellín
Borges 90+2'	Report	Arias 79'

Estádio Cícero Pompeu de Toledo (Morumbi), São Paulo
Attendance: 30,375
Referee: Sergio Pezzotta (Argentina)

February 24, 2009
20:30 UTC−05:00

Independiente Medellín (Colombia)	0–0	(Uruguay) Defensor Sporting
	Report

Estadio Atanasio Girardot, Medellín
Referee: Carlos Vera (Ecuador)

March 5, 2009
21:40 UTC−05:00

América de Cali (Colombia)	1–3	(Brazil) São Paulo
Cortés 85'	Report	Washington 2', 27'; Borges 49'

Estadio Pascual Guerrero, Cali
Attendance: 15,116
Referee: Héctor Baldassi (Argentina)

March 10, 2009
21:30 UTC−05:00

América de Cali (Colombia)	1–1	(Colombia) Independiente Medellín
Vanegas 81' (o.g.)	Report	Vanegas 53'

Estadio Pascual Guerrero, Cali
Referee: Francisco Peñuela (Colombia)

March 17, 2009
21:00 UTC−05:00

Independiente Medellín (Colombia)	0–0	(Colombia) América de Cali
	Report

Estadio Atanasio Girardot, Medellín
Attendance: 12,465
Referee: Óscar Ruiz (Colombia)

March 18, 2009
21:50 UTC−03:00

Defensor Sporting (Uruguay)	0–1	(Brazil) São Paulo
	Report	Borges 39'

Estadio Centenario, Montevideo
Attendance: 19,339
Referee: Carlos Amarilla (Paraguay)

April 9, 2009
19:15 UTC−03:00

São Paulo (Brazil)	2–1	(Uruguay) Defensor Sporting
Borges 70', 74'	Report	de Souza 38'

Estádio Cícero Pompeu de Toledo (Morumbi), São Paulo
Attendance: 47,205
Referee: Carlos Chandía (Chile)

April 15, 2009
22:00 UTC−05:00

Independiente Medellín (Colombia)	2–1	(Brazil) São Paulo
Cabrera 17'; Castillo 27'	Report	André Lima 39'

Estadio Atanasio Girardot, Medellín
Referee: Carlos Vera (Ecuador )

April 16, 2009
21:45 UTC−05:00

América de Cali (Colombia)	0–0	(Uruguay) Defensor Sporting
	Report

Estadio Pascual Guerrero, Cali
Referee: Saúl Laverni (Argentina)

April 22, 2009
21:50 UTC−03:00

Defensor Sporting (Uruguay)	4–3	(Colombia) Independiente Medellín
Navarro 14', 90+4'; Vera 35' de Souza 83'	Report	Arias 19'; A. Ortiz 77'; Cabrera 89'

Estadio Centenario, Montevideo
Referee: Federico Beligoy (Argentina)

April 22, 2009
21:50 UTC−03:00

São Paulo (Brazil)	2–1	(Colombia) América de Cali
Dagoberto 57', 76'	Report	Parra 8'

Estádio Cícero Pompeu de Toledo (Morumbi), São Paulo
Attendance: 23,221
Referee: Carlos Torres (Paraguay)

=== Group 5 ===
Pos	Team	Pld	W	D	L	GF	GA	GD	Pts	(Brazil) CRU	(Argentina) ELP	(Ecuador) QUI	(Bolivia) UNI
1	(Brazil) Cruzeiro	6	4	1	1	9	5	+4	13	—	3–0	2–0	2–0
2	(Argentina) Estudiantes	6	3	1	2	9	4	+5	10	4–0	—	4–0	1–0
3	(Ecuador) Deportivo Quito	6	2	2	2	6	9	−3	8	1–1	1–0	—	3–1
4	(Bolivia) Universitario de Sucre	6	0	2	4	2	8	−6	2	0–1	0–0	1–1	—

Legend: Blue = home team win; Yellow = draw; Red = away team win.
February 12, 2009
21:30 UTC−04:00

Universitario (Bolivia)	1–1	(Ecuador) Deportivo Quito
Gómez 51'	Report	Donoso 68'

Estadio Olímpico Patria, Sucre
Referee: Manuel Garay (Peru)

February 19, 2009
19:15 UTC−03:00

Cruzeiro (Brazil)	3–0	(Argentina) Estudiantes
Fernandinho 63' (pen.); Kléber 69', 72'	Report

Estádio Governador Magalhães Pinto (Mineirão), Belo Horizonte
Attendance: 33,969
Referee: Carlos Amarilla (Paraguay)

February 25, 2009
19:50 UTC−05:00

Deportivo Quito (Ecuador)	1–1	(Brazil) Cruzeiro
Caicedo 90+1'	Report	Ramires 39'

Estadio Olímpico Atahualpa, Quito
Referee: Georges Buckley (Peru)

February 26, 2009
20:45 UTC−03:00

Estudiantes (Argentina)	1–0	(Bolivia) Universitario
Salgueiro 16'	Report

Estadio Ciudad de La Plata, La Plata
Referee: Pablo Pozo (Chile)

March 4, 2009
20:50 UTC−04:00

Universitario (Bolivia)	0–1	(Brazil) Cruzeiro
	Report	Thiago Ribeiro 38'

Estadio Olímpico Patria, Sucre
Referee: Roberto Silvera (Uruguay)

March 10, 2009
17:00 UTC−05:00

Deportivo Quito (Ecuador)	1–0	(Argentina) Estudiantes
Preciado 85'	Report

Estadio Olímpico Atahualpa, Quito
Attendance: 8,030
Referee: Juan Soto (Venezuela)

March 18, 2009
21:50 UTC−03:00

Cruzeiro (Brazil)	2–0	(Bolivia) Universitario
Wellington Paulista 57' (pen.), 90'	Report

Governador Magalhães Pinto (Mineirão), Belo Horizonte
Attendance: 14,439
Referee: Federico Beligoy (Argentina)

March 19, 2009
19:15 UTC−03:00

Estudiantes (Argentina)	4–0	(Ecuador) Deportivo Quito
Boselli 4', 25', 69'; Pérez 44'	Report

Estadio Ciudad de La Plata, La Plata
Referee: Carlos Simon (Brazil)

April 8, 2009
22:30 UTC−03:00

Estudiantes (Argentina)	4–0	(Brazil) Cruzeiro
Verón 6'; G. Fernández 32'; Sánchez Prette 74', 78'	Report

Estadio Ciudad de La Plata, La Plata
Attendance: 18,505
Referee: Roberto Silvera (Uruguay)

April 14, 2009
17:00 UTC−05:00

Deportivo Quito (Ecuador)	3–1	(Bolivia) Universitario
Saritama 11', 60'; Preciado 42' (pen.)	Report	Raimondi 26'

Estadio Olímpico Atahualpa, Quito
Referee: Marco Rodríguez (Mexico)

April 22, 2009
18:30 UTC−04:00

Universitario (Bolivia)	0–0	(Argentina) Estudiantes
	Report

Estadio Olímpico Patria, Sucre
Referee: Carlos Chandía (Chile)

April 22, 2009
19:30 UTC−03:00

Cruzeiro (Brazil)	2–0	(Ecuador) Deportivo Quito
Léo Fortunato 14'; Wagner 26'	Report

Governador Magalhães Pinto (Mineirão), Belo Horizonte
Attendance: 34,175
Referee: Carlos Amarilla (Paraguay)

=== Group 6 ===
Pos	Team	Pld	W	D	L	GF	GA	GD	Pts	(Venezuela) CAR	(Mexico) GDL	(Chile) EVE	(Argentina) LAN
1	(Venezuela) Caracas	6	3	1	2	7	4	+3	10	—	2–0	1–0	3–1
2	(Mexico) Guadalajara	6	2	3	1	9	6	+3	9	1–0	—	6–2	0–0
3	(Chile) Everton	6	2	2	2	7	10	−3	8	1–0	1–1	—	1–1
4	(Argentina) Lanús	6	0	4	2	5	8	−3	4	1–1	1–1	1–2	—

Legend: Blue = home team win; Yellow = draw; Red = away team win.
February 11, 2009
18:20 UTC−03:00

Lanús (Argentina)	1–1	(Mexico) Guadalajara
Sand 90+3'	Report	Ávila 33'

Estadio Ciudad de Lanús, Lanús
Attendance: 4,885
Referee: Roberto Silvera (Uruguay)

February 17, 2009
19:00 UTC−03:00

Everton (Chile)	1–0	(Venezuela) Caracas
Gutiérrez 45'	Report

Estadio Sausalito, Viña del Mar
Attendance: 12,200
Referee: Antonio Arias (Paraguay)

February 25, 2009
18:00 UTC−04:30

Caracas (Venezuela)	3–1	(Argentina) Lanús
Rey 47'; Figueroa 49'; Castellín 71'	Report	Sand 84'

Estadio Olímpico, Caracas
Attendance: 6,533
Referee: Wilmar Roldán (Colombia)

February 25, 2009
21:10 UTC−06:00

Guadalajara (Mexico)	6–2	(Chile) Everton
Ponce 18'; Morales 23' (pen.); Medina 32'; Fabián 37'; Hernández 78', 88'	Report	Gutiérrez 50'; Miralles 53' (pen.)

Estadio Jalisco, Guadalajara
Referee: Saúl Laverni (Argentina)

March 3, 2009
20:45 UTC−04:30

Caracas (Venezuela)	2–0	(Mexico) Guadalajara
Bustamante 45+1'; Figueroa 50'	Report

Estadio Olímpico, Caracas
Referee: Carlos Vera (Ecuador)

March 11, 2009
19:30 UTC−04:00

Everton (Chile)	1–1	(Argentina) Lanús
Miralles 55' (pen.)	Report	González 45'

Estadio Sausalito, Viña del Mar
Referee: Jorge Larrionda (Uruguay)

March 11, 2009
21:10 UTC−06:00

Guadalajara (Mexico)	1–0	(Venezuela) Caracas
Galindo 79'	Report

Estadio Jalisco, Guadalajara
Attendance: 13,319
Referee: Víctor Hugo Carrillo (Peru)

March 17, 2009
20:45 UTC−03:00

Lanús (Argentina)	1–2	(Chile) Everton
Biglieri 29'	Report	Gutiérrez 53'; Muñoz 90+3'

Estadio Ciudad de Lanús, Lanús
Referee: Paulo César de Oliveira (Brazil)

April 14, 2009
19:45 UTC−04:30

Caracas (Venezuela)	1–0	(Chile) Everton
Figueroa 62' (pen.)	Report

Estadio Olímpico, Caracas
Referee: Albert Duarte (Colombia)

April 14, 2009
21:30 UTC−06:00

Guadalajara (Mexico)	0–0	(Argentina) Lanús
	Report

Estadio Jalisco, Guadalajara
Referee: Carlos Torres (Paraguay)

April 29, 2009
18:30 UTC−04:00

Everton (Chile)	1–1	(Mexico) Guadalajara
Riveros 47'	Report	Hernández 8'

Estadio Sausalito, Viña del Mar
Referee: Héctor Baldassi (Argentina)

April 29, 2009
19:30 UTC−03:00

Lanús (Argentina)	1–1	(Venezuela) Caracas
Macalik 39'	Report	Figueroa 30'

Estadio Ciudad de Lanús, Lanús
Attendance: 793
Referee: Carlos Vera (Ecuador)

=== Group 7 ===
Pos	Team	Pld	W	D	L	GF	GA	GD	Pts	(Brazil) GRÊ	(Chile) UCH	(Colombia) BOY	(Bolivia) AUR
1	(Brazil) Grêmio	6	5	1	0	11	1	+10	16	—	0–0	3–0	3–0
2	Universidad de Chile	6	3	1	2	8	6	+2	10	0–2	—	3–0	3–0
3	(Colombia) Boyacá Chicó	6	3	0	3	8	8	0	9	0–1	3–0	—	2–1
4	(Bolivia) Aurora	6	0	0	6	3	15	−12	0	1–2	1–2	0–3	—

Legend: Blue = home team win; Yellow = draw; Red = away team win.
February 10, 2009
21:30 UTC−04:00

Aurora (Bolivia)	0–3	(Colombia) Boyacá Chicó
	Report	Tapia 45', 79'; Mahecha 90+1'

Estadio Félix Capriles, Cochabamba
Referee: Víctor Hugo Carrillo (Peru)

February 25, 2009
21:50 UTC−03:00

Grêmio (Brazil)	0–0	Universidad de Chile
	Report

Estádio Olímpico Monumental, Porto Alegre
Attendance: 33,431
Referee: Martín Vázquez (Uruguay)

March 4, 2009
19:30 UTC−04:00

Universidad de Chile	3–0	(Bolivia) Aurora
Iturra 23'; Villalobos 80'; Rojas 88'	Report

Estadio Francisco Sánchez Rumoroso, Coquimbo
Attendance: 12,896
Referee: Carlos Galeano (Paraguay)

March 11, 2009
19:50 UTC−05:00

Boyacá Chicó (Colombia)	0–1	(Brazil) Grêmio
	Report	Souza 31'

Estadio La Independencia, Tunja
Referee: Sergio Pezzotta (Argentina)

March 18, 2009
17:00 UTC−05:00

Boyacá Chicó (Colombia)	3–0	Universidad de Chile
Móvil 4'; Girón 22'; Nuñez 70'	Report

Estadio La Independencia, Tunja
Referee: Carlos Vera (Ecuador)

March 25, 2009
20:50 UTC−04:00

Aurora (Bolivia)	1–2	(Brazil) Grêmio
Paredes 53'	Report	Jonas 41'; Tcheco 87'

Estadio Félix Capriles, Cochabamba
Referee: Juan Soto (Venezuela)

April 7, 2009
19:00 UTC−03:00

Grêmio (Brazil)	3–0	(Bolivia) Aurora
Rafael Marques 32'; López 64'; Réver 81'	Report

Estádio Olímpico Monumental, Porto Alegre
Attendance: 27,638
Referee: Antonio Arias (Paraguay)

April 8, 2009
20:50 UTC−04:00

Universidad de Chile	3–0	(Colombia) Boyacá Chicó
Hernández 22'; Olivera 47'; Cuevas 90'	Report

Estadio Nacional, Santiago
Attendance: 34,651
Referee: Gabriel Favale (Argentina)

April 15, 2009
21:00 UTC−04:00

Universidad de Chile	0–2	(Brazil) Grêmio
	Report	Léo 32'; López 66'

Estadio Nacional, Santiago
Attendance: 33,140
Referee: Carlos Amarilla (Paraguay)

April 16, 2009
17:15 UTC−05:00

Boyacá Chicó (Colombia)	2–1	(Bolivia) Aurora
Caneo 49'; Pérez 69'	Report	Fernández 87'

Estadio La Independencia, Tunja
Referee: Samuel Haro (Ecuador)

April 28, 2009
18:30 UTC−04:00

Aurora (Bolivia)	1–2	Universidad de Chile
Paredes 20'	Report	Estrada 14'; González 73'

Estadio Félix Capriles, Cochabamba
Referee: Víctor Hugo Rivera (Peru)

April 28, 2009
19:30 UTC−03:00

Grêmio (Brazil)	3–0	(Colombia) Boyacá Chicó
Souza 13', 17'; Léo 30'	Report

Estádio Olímpico Monumental, Porto Alegre
Attendance: 34,974
Referee: Jorge Larrionda (Uruguay)

=== Group 8 ===
Pos	Team	Pld	W	D	L	GF	GA	GD	Pts	(Paraguay) LIB	(Mexico) SLU	(Peru) UNI	(Argentina) SLO
1	(Paraguay) Libertad	6	4	0	2	7	5	+2	12	—	0–2	2–1	2–0
2	(Mexico) San Luis	6	2	2	2	7	7	0	8	0–1	—	2–2	2–0
3	(Peru) Universitario	6	2	2	2	6	7	−1	8	2–1	0–0	—	1–0
4	(Argentina) San Lorenzo	6	2	0	4	6	7	−1	6	0–1	4–1	2–0	—

Legend: Blue = home team win; Yellow = draw; Red = away team win.
February 11, 2009
20:30 UTC−03:00

San Lorenzo (Argentina)	4–1	(Mexico) San Luis
Silvera 3', 16'; Bergessio 31'; Barrientos 48'	Report	Lojero 70'

Estadio Pedro Bidegain, Buenos Aires
Referee: Leonardo Gaciba (Brazil)

February 11, 2009
21:40 UTC−03:00

Libertad (Paraguay)	2–1	(Peru) Universitario
Maciel 42'; Román 83'	Report	Solano 63'

Estadio Feliciano Cáceres, Luque
Referee: Federico Beligoy (Argentina)

February 19, 2009
19:30 UTC−05:00

Universitario (Peru)	1–0	(Argentina) San Lorenzo
Solano 21' (pen.)	Report

Estadio Monumental, Lima
Referee: Salvio Fagundes (Brazil)

February 26, 2009
19:15 UTC−06:00

San Luis (Mexico)	0–1	(Paraguay) Libertad
	Report	Ramírez 16'

Estadio Alfonso Lastras Ramírez, San Luis Potosí
Referee: Héctor Baldassi (Argentina)

March 5, 2009
19:00 UTC−04:00

Libertad (Paraguay)	2–0	(Argentina) San Lorenzo
Ximénez 25'; Aquino 37'	Report

Estadio Feliciano Cáceres, Luque
Referee: Carlos Chandía (Chile)

March 10, 2009
19:15 UTC−05:00

Universitario (Peru)	0–0	(Mexico) San Luis
	Report

Estadio Monumental, Lima
Attendance: 32,567
Referee: Joaquín Antequera (Bolivia)

March 18, 2009
19:00 UTC−03:00

San Lorenzo (Argentina)	0–1	(Paraguay) Libertad
	Report	Aguirre 53' (o.g.)

Estadio Pedro Bidegain, Buenos Aires
Referee: Roberto Silvera (Uruguay)

March 18, 2009
21:10 UTC−06:00

San Luis (Mexico)	2–2	(Peru) Universitario
Reyes 25'; Orozco 77'	Report	Alva 34'; Labarthe 90+1'

Estadio Alfonso Lastras Ramírez, San Luis Potosí
Referee: Alfredo Intriago (Ecuador)

April 7, 2009
21:30 UTC−05:00

Universitario (Peru)	2–1	(Paraguay) Libertad
Calheira 28'; Alva 61'	Report	Ximénez 21'

Estadio Monumental, Lima
Attendance: 24,923
Referee: Carlos Vera (Ecuador)

April 8, 2009
17:30 UTC−06:00

San Luis (Mexico)	2–0	(Argentina) San Lorenzo
Palacios 43'; Reyes 67'	Report

Estadio Alfonso Lastras Ramírez, San Luis Potosí
Referee: Jorge Larrionda (Uruguay)

April 28, 2009
21:50 UTC−03:00

San Lorenzo (Argentina)	2–0	(Peru) Universitario
Calheira 21' (o.g.); Gómez 24'	Report

Estadio Pedro Bidegain, Buenos Aires
Attendance: 2,856
Referee: Enrique Osses (Chile)

April 28, 2009
21:50 UTC−04:00

Libertad (Paraguay)	0–2	(Mexico) San Luis
	Report	Patiño 58'; Reyes 90+1'

Estadio Feliciano Cáceres, Luque
Attendance: 3,227
Referee: Paulo César de Oliveira (Brazil)
