= Final Copa Mustang 2008-II =

- Event: 2008-II Copa Mustang
Medellín	América
1	4
- Date: 17 December 2008 & 21 December 2008
- Venue: Estadio Atanasio Girardot & Estadio Olímpico Pascual Guerrero, Medellín & Cali
- Attendance: Medellín: 44,641; Cali: ~42,000

The final of the 2008-II Copa Mustang was played between Independiente Medellín and América de Cali. The first leg match was won by América de Cali by an early goal in the second half. In the second leg match, América de Cali were crowned champions of the 2008-II Copa Mustang championship, giving them the chance to participate in the Copa Libertadores 2009 (same way to Independiente Medellín and giving them the championship for the thirteenth time in their history.

== Matches ==
=== First leg match ===
2008-12-17
20:00

Independiente Medellín	0–1	América de Cali
		Cortés 63'

Estadio Atanasio Girardot, Medellín
Attendance: 44,641
Referee: Imer Machado (Colombia)

Independiente Medellín	América de Cali

MEDELLÍN:
GK	1	(Paraguay) Aldo Bobadilla
RB	26	(Colombia) Juan Cuadrado
CB	19	(Colombia) Jamel Ramos	(yellow card) 76' (substituted off) 90+1'
CB	2	(Paraguay) Daniel Sanabria
LB	3	(Colombia) Andrés Felipe Ortiz	(yellow card) 40'
RM	21	(Colombia) John Restrepo	(c)
CM	25	(Colombia) Juan Carlos Quintero
CM	8	(Colombia) Danilson Córdoba	(substituted off) 67'
LM	10	(Argentina) Ómar Pérez
SS	7	(Colombia) Diego Álvarez	(substituted off) 60'
CF	9	(Colombia) Jackson Martínez
Substitutes:
GK	12	(Colombia) David Andrade Hernández
DF	20	(Colombia) Iván Arturo Corredor	(substituted on) 67'
DF	4	(Colombia) Hernán Pertúz
DF	16	(Colombia) Ormedis Madera
MF	17	(Colombia) Jaime Castrillón	(substituted on) 90+1'
FW	10	(Colombia) Rafael Castillo
FW	15	(Colombia) Carlos Daniel Hidalgo	(substituted on) 60'
Manager:
(Colombia) Santiago Escobar

AMÉRICA:
GK	1	(Uruguay) Adrián Berbia
RB	7	(Colombia) Pablo Armero	(yellow card) 28'
CB	26	(Colombia) Pedro Tavima
CB	24	(Colombia) John Viafara
LB	13	(Colombia) Ivan Velez	(yellow card) 20'
DM	14	(Colombia) Jhon Valencia	(yellow card) 32'
DM	4	(Colombia) Jaime Córdoba
RM	17	(Colombia) Paulo Arango
LM	25	(Colombia) Víctor Cortés	63' (yellow card) 65' (substituted off) 80'
AM	8	(Colombia) Wilmer Parra Cadena	(c) (substituted off) 87'
CF	20	(Colombia) Gustavo Adrian Ramos
Substitutes:
GK	23	(Colombia) José Huber Escobar
DF	3	(Colombia) Fernando Monroy
FW	10	(Colombia) Harrison Otálvaro	(substituted on) 80'
FW	21	(Colombia) Wilson Morelo	(substituted on) 87'
Manager:
(Colombia) Diego Umaña

Man of the Match:
(Colombia) Víctor Cortés

=== Second leg match ===
2008-12-21
17:30

América de Cali	3–1	Independiente Medellín
Ramos 25'; J. Ramos (o.g) 60'; Córdoba 89'		Álvarez 17'

Estadio Pascual Guerrero, Cali
Attendance: ~42,000
Referee: Oscar Ruiz (Colombia)

América de Cali	Independiente Medellín

AMÉRICA:
GK	1	(Uruguay) Adrián Berbia
RB	7	(Colombia) Pablo Armero
CB	26	(Colombia) Pedro Tavima
CB	24	(Colombia) John Viafara	(yellow card) 29'
LB	13	(Colombia) Ivan Velez
DM	14	(Colombia) Jhon Valencia
DM	4	(Colombia) Jaime Córdoba	89'
RM	17	(Colombia) Paulo Arango	(yellow card) 39'
LM	25	(Colombia) Víctor Cortés
AM	8	(Colombia) Wilmer Parra Cadena	(c) (substituted off) 76'
CF	20	(Colombia) Gustavo Adrian Ramos	25'
Substitutes:
GK	12	(Colombia) José Huber Escobar
DF	2	(Colombia) Fernando Monroy
DF	3	(Colombia) Jorge Penaloza
MF	17	(Colombia) Paulo Cesar Arango
MF	16	(Colombia) Jersson González
FW	10	(Colombia) Harrison Otálvaro	(substituted on) 76'
FW	9	(Colombia) Wilson Morelo
Manager:
(Colombia) Diego Umaña

AMÉRICA:
GK	1	(Paraguay) Aldo Bobadilla
RB	26	(Colombia) Juan Cuadrado	(substituted off) 52'
CB	19	(Colombia) Jamel Ramos	(yellow card) 13' (goal) 60' (o.g)
CB	2	(Paraguay) Daniel Sanabria
LB	3	(Colombia) Andrés Felipe Ortiz	(yellow card) 63'
RM	21	(Colombia) John Restrepo	(c)
CM	25	(Colombia) Juan Carlos Quintero	(yellow card) 44' (substituted off) 76'
CM	8	(Colombia) Danilson Córdoba
LM	10	(Argentina) Ómar Pérez
SS	7	(Colombia) Diego Álvarez	17'
CF	9	(Colombia) Jackson Martínez	(yellow card) 29'
Substitutes:
GK	12	(Colombia) David Andrade Hernández
DF	20	(Colombia) Iván Arturo Corredor
DF	4	(Colombia) Hernán Pertúz
DF	16	(Colombia) Ormedis Madera
MF	17	(Colombia) Jaime Castrillón	(substituted on) 52'
FW	10	(Colombia) Rafael Castillo
FW	15	(Colombia) Carlos Daniel Hidalgo	(substituted on) 76'
Manager:
(Colombia) Santiago Escobar

Man of the Match:
(Colombia) Gustavo Adrian Ramos
