= 2009 Copa Libertadores First Stage =

The First Stage of the 2009 Copa Santander Libertadores ran from January 27 to February 5.

== Format ==
Twelve teams qualified into this rounds and each will play a two-legged tie, one at home and one away. The winner of each tie will advance to the Second Stage. The teams will earn 3 points for a win, 1 point for a draw, and 0 for a loss. The team with the most points advances. The following criteria will be used for breaking ties on points:

1. Goal difference
2. Goals scored
3. Away goals

== Results ==
Team #1 played the first leg at home.

Teams			Scores		Tie-breakers		
Team #1	Points	Team #2	1st leg	2nd leg	GD	AG	Pen.
Peñarol (Uruguay)	1:4	(Colombia) Independiente Medellín	0–4	0–0	—	—	—
Estudiantes (Argentina)	3:3	(Peru) Sporting Cristal	1–2	1–0	0:0	1:0	—
Nacional (Paraguay)	4:1	(Ecuador) El Nacional	5–0	3–3	—	—	—
Deportivo Cuenca (Ecuador)	3:3	(Venezuela) Deportivo Anzoátegui	0–2	3–0	+1:−1	—	—
Real Potosí (Bolivia)	0:6	(Brazil) Palmeiras	1–5	0–2	—	—	—
Pachuca (Mexico)	3:3	Universidad de Chile	0–1	2–1	0:0	0:1	—

== Matches ==
=== First leg ===
January 27, 2009
17:00 UTC−05:00

El Nacional (Ecuador)	0–5	(Paraguay) Nacional
	Report	Román 51'; Núñez 56', 85'; Cáceres 70'; Melgarejo 87'

Estadio Olímpico Atahualpa, Quito
Attendance: 6,757
Referee: José Buitrago (Colombia)

January 28, 2009
19:00 UTC−04:00

Universidad de Chile	1–0	(Mexico) Pachuca
Díaz 4'	Report

Estadio Santa Laura, Santiago
Referee: Heber Lopes (Brazil)

January 28, 2009
21:30 UTC−05:00

Independiente Medellín (Colombia)	4–0	(Uruguay) Peñarol
Martínez 15', 18', 46'; Corredor 34'	Report

Estadio Atanasio Girardot, Medellín
Attendance: 15,750
Referee: Víctor Hugo Rivera (Peru)

January 29, 2009
20:30 UTC−03:00

Palmeiras (Brazil)	5–1	(Bolivia) Real Potosí
Keirrison 3', 20' (pen.); Diego Souza 39'; Cleiton Xavier 58'; Edmílson 90+1'	Report	Rodríguez 22'

Palestra Itália (Parque Antártica), São Paulo
Attendance: 23,694
Referee: Roberto Silvera (Uruguay)

January 29, 2009
15:00 UTC−05:00

Sporting Cristal (Peru)	2–1	(Argentina) Estudiantes
Palacios 42'; Hurtado 55'	Report	Pérez 29'

Estadio San Martín de Porres, Lima
Attendance: 16,302
Referee: Carlos Chandía (Chile)

January 29, 2009
21:30 UTC−04:30

Deportivo Anzoátegui (Venezuela)	2–0	(Ecuador) Deportivo Cuenca
Espíndola 11'; González 51'	Report

Estadio José Antonio Anzoátegui, Puerto La Cruz
Attendance: 10,000
Referee: Víctor Hugo Carrillo (Peru)

=== Second leg ===
February 3, 2009
21:15 UTC−03:00

Peñarol (Uruguay)	0–0	(Colombia) Independiente Medellín
	Report

Estadio Centenario, Montevideo
Attendance: 19,590
Referee: Carlos Torres (Paraguay)

Independiente Medellín advances on points 4–1.

February 3, 2009
20:45 UTC−05:00

Deportivo Cuenca (Ecuador)	3–0	(Venezuela) Deportivo Anzoátegui
Teixeira 27', 68'; Villalba 74'	Report

Estadio Alejandro Serrano Aguilar, Cuenca
Attendance: 7,275
Referee: Óscar Maldonado (Bolivia)

Deportivo Cuenca advances on goal difference.

February 4, 2009
20:30 UTC−03:00

Estudiantes (Argentina)	1–0	(Peru) Sporting Cristal
Lentini 76'	Report

Estadio Ciudad de La Plata, La Plata
Attendance: 20,426
Referee: Leonardo Gaciba (Brazil)

Estudiantes advances on away goals.

February 4, 2009
21:00 UTC−03:00

Real Potosí (Bolivia)	0–2	(Brazil) Palmeiras
	Report	Cleiton Xavier 29'; Keirrison 74'

Estadio Victor Agustín Ugarte, Potosí
Attendance: 3,055
Referee: Carlos Galeano (Paraguay)

Palmeiras advances on points 6–0.

February 4, 2009
21:15 UTC−06:00

Pachuca (Mexico)	2–1	Universidad de Chile
Rodríguez 24' (pen.); Álvarez 86'	Report	Estrada 58'

Estadio Hidalgo, Pachuca
Attendance: 13,140
Referee: Alfredo Intriago (Ecuador)

Universidad de Chile advances on away goals.

February 5, 2009
20:15 UTC−04:00

Nacional (Paraguay)	3–3	(Ecuador) El Nacional
Núñez 9', 14'; Melgarejo 28'	Report	Pita 32'; Ladines 35'; Zura 43'

General Pablo Rojas, Asunción
Attendance: 2,801
Referee: Sergio Pezzotta (Argentina)

Nacional advances on points 4–1.
