= 2010 Categoría Primera A season =

Liga Postobón
- Season: 2010
- Champions: Apertura: Junior (6th title); Finalización: Once Caldas (4th title)
- Relegated: Cortuluá
- 2011 Copa Libertadores: Junior; Once Caldas; Deportes Tolima
- 2011 Copa Sudamericana: Santa Fe; La Equidad
- Top goalscorer: Apertura: Carlos Rentería; Carlos Bacca (12 goals each); Finalización: Wilder Medina; Dayro Moreno (16 goals each)

The 2010 Categoria Primera A season was the 63rd season of Colombia's top-flight football league. Because of new sponsorship, it was officially called the 2010 Liga Postobón season.

== Format ==
The Assembly of DIMAYOR established a new system of competition on December 10, 2009.

Apertura
The First Stage of the Apertura was a single round-robin tournament in 18 dates. The top four teams at the end of this stage advanced to the semifinals and pitted into two ties: 1 vs. 4 and 2 vs. 3. The winners of the semifinals contested the finals.

Finalización
The Finalizacion was the same as the previous season.

== Teams ==
Locations of the 2010 Primera A teams

Team	City	Stadium
América	Cali	Pascual Guerrero
Atlético Huila	Neiva	Guillermo Plazas Alcid
Atlético Nacional	Medellín	Atanasio Girardot
Boyacá Chicó	Tunja	La Independencia
Cortuluá	Tuluá	Doce de Octubre
Cúcuta Deportivo	Cúcuta	General Santander
Deportes Quindío	Armenia	Centenario
Deportes Tolima	Ibagué	Manuel Murillo Toro
Deportivo Cali	Cali	Pascual Guerrero
Deportivo Cali	Palmira	Deportivo Cali
Deportivo Pereira	Pereira	Hernán Ramírez Villegas
Envigado	Envigado	Polideportivo Sur
Independiente Medellín	Medellín	Atanasio Girardot
Junior	Barranquilla	Metropolitano
La Equidad	Bogotá	Metropolitano de Techo
Millonarios	Bogotá	Nemesio Camacho
Once Caldas	Manizales	Palogrande
Real Cartagena	Cartagena	Jaime Morón León
Santa Fe	Bogotá	Nemesio Camacho

== Campeonato Apertura ==
The Liga Postobon I was scheduled to begin on January 31, 2010.

=== First stage ===
==== Standings ====
Pos	Team	Pld	W	D	L	GF	GA	GD	Pts	Qualification
1	Deportes Tolima	18	10	4	4	36	22	+14	34	Qualified for the Semifinals
2	Independiente Medellín	18	9	6	3	29	17	+12	33	Qualified for the Semifinals
3	Junior	18	9	5	4	28	17	+11	32	Qualified for the Semifinals
4	La Equidad	18	9	4	5	29	25	+4	31	Qualified for the Semifinals
5	Deportivo Cali	18	9	3	6	28	20	+8	30	
6	Santa Fe	18	9	3	6	25	23	+2	30	
7	Boyacá Chicó	18	8	5	5	25	24	+1	29	
8	Atlético Nacional	18	9	1	8	28	24	+4	28	
9	Real Cartagena	18	8	4	6	24	26	−2	28	
10	Once Caldas	18	7	4	7	32	28	+4	25	
11	Huila	18	6	6	6	30	26	+4	24	
12	Envigado	18	6	5	7	23	30	−7	23	
13	Cúcuta Deportivo	18	5	5	8	14	21	−7	20	
14	Millonarios	18	5	4	9	22	29	−7	19	
15	Deportivo Pereira	18	4	6	8	23	28	−5	18	
16	América	18	4	4	10	18	28	−10	16	
17	Cortuluá	18	4	3	11	19	32	−13	15	
18	Quindío	18	4	2	12	9	22	−13	14	

Source: RSSSF
Rules for classification: 1st points; 2nd goal difference; 3rd goals scored; 4th away goals scored; 5th away goals against; 6th draw.

==== Results ====
Home \ Away	AME	HUI	NAC	BOY	COR	CUC	QUI	TOL	CAL	PER	ENV	DIM	JUN	EQU	MIL	ONC	RCA	SFE
América		2–2			0–1				1–2		2–2	1–0	2–2	3–1	3–2	2–1		
Huila					1–1			1–3	1–0		2–2		0–0	4–1	1–1	3–2		3–0
Atlético Nacional	2–0	2–1						1–0	2–0	3–2		1–2	1–0			1–2	4–2	
Boyacá Chicó	1–0	1–1	3–2			2–0	2–0	1–1		1–1				2–0			0–2	
Cortuluá			0–2	1–2		0–0	0–1	1–5		1–1		1–2					1–2	2–0
Cúcuta Deportivo	3–0	2–3	1–1				1–0	1–0		0–2	2–2					1–0	2–0	
Quindío	2–0	2–1	0–1		1–2			0–3		1–0			1–2			0–2	0–0	
Deportes Tolima	2–1	1–0							3–1	1–0		1–1	2–2		2–1	1–1	3–1	
Deportivo Cali	1–1			3–0	5–3	1–1	2–0				1–0			0–0	4–1			0–1
Deportivo Pereira	1–0	1–3							1–3			1–2	2–2	2–2	1–1	1–1	3–0	
Envigado			2–1	1–0	2–0	1–0	2–0	2–3		2–1		1–7						1–1
Independiente Medellín		3–2	2–1	0–0		3–0	1–0		2–1				1–1			0–0		0–0
Junior				3–1	3–2	2–0			3–0		2–0			2–0	2–0		0–3	2–0
La Equidad			2–1	2–1	3–0	0–0	1–0	4–3			2–0	2–1						1–2
Millonarios			2–1	2–3	0–2	2–0	0–0				2–1	3–1		1–1				2–1
Once Caldas				3–3	2–1				0–3	5–1	3–1		1–0	2–3	3–1			1–2
Real Cartagena	1–0	2–1							0–1		1–1	1–1	1–0	1–4	1–0	4–3		
Santa Fe	2–0		3–0	2–3		2–0	2–1	3–2		0–2					2–1		2–2	

Updated to match(es) played on May 16, 2010. Source: RSSSF
Legend: Blue = home team win; Yellow = draw; Red = away team win.

=== Semifinals ===
The four qualified teams from the first stage were placed into two semifinals labelled "Semifinal A" and "Semifinal B". Each semifinal was played on a home and away basis. The teams that made up each semifinal were determined by their first stage standings: Semifinal A was between the teams that finished 1st and 4th; Semifinal B was between the teams that finished 2nd and 3rd. The team in each semifinal that finished higher in the table played the second leg at home. The winner of each semifinal advanced to the Finals.

==== Semifinal A ====
Pos	Team	Pld	W	D	L	GF	GA	GD	Pts	Qualification
1	La Equidad	2	0	2	0	3	3	0	2	Finals
2	Deportes Tolima	2	0	2	0	3	3	0	2	

Source: DIMAYOR (in Spanish)
Rules for classification: 1st points; 2nd goal difference; 3rd penalty shoot-out.
May 19, 2010
19:30 UTC−05:00

La Equidad	2–2	Deportes Tolima
Sheput 19'; Rentería 60'	Report	Marangoni 60'; Canchila 76' (o.g.)

Estadio Nemesio Camacho "El Campín", Bogotá
Referee: Imer Machado

May 22, 2010
18:20 UTC−05:00

Deportes Tolima	1–1	La Equidad
Arizala 2'	Report	Cárdenas 26'
Penalties
Marangoni (penalty missed); Bustos (penalty scored); Medina (penalty missed); Arizala (penalty missed)	1–3	(penalty missed) Martínez; (penalty scored) Sheput; (penalty missed) Córdoba; (penalty scored) Ramos; (penalty scored) Viáfara

Estadio Manuel Murillo Toro, Ibagué
Referee: Oscar Alexis Gutiérrez

==== Semifinal B ====
Pos	Team	Pld	W	D	L	GF	GA	GD	Pts	Qualification
1	Junior	2	1	0	1	3	2	+1	3	Finals
2	Independiente Medellín	2	1	0	1	2	3	−1	3	

Source: DIMAYOR (in Spanish)
Rules for classification: 1st points; 2nd goal difference; 3rd penalty shoot-out.
May 20, 2010
19:30 UTC−05:00

Junior	3–1	Independiente Medellín
Cortés 14', 24'; Hernández 49'	Report	Arias 2'

Estadio Metropolitano Roberto Meléndez, Barranquilla
Referee: Albert Duarte

May 23, 2010
17:45 UTC−05:00

Independiente Medellín	1–0	Junior
Giménez 38'	Report

Estadio Atanasio Girardot, Medellín
Referee: Héctor Jairo Parra

=== Finals ===
Pos	Team	Pld	W	D	L	GF	GA	GD	Pts	Qualification
1	Junior	2	1	0	1	3	2	+1	3	2011 Copa Libertadores Second Stage
2	La Equidad	2	1	0	1	2	3	−1	3	

Source: DIMAYOR (in Spanish)
Rules for classification: 1st points; 2nd goal difference; 3rd penalty shoot-out.
May 26, 2010
19:05 UTC−05:00

La Equidad	1–0	Junior
Sheput 12'	Report

Estadio Nemesio Camacho "El Campín", Bogotá
Referee: Imer Machado

June 2, 2010
19:05 UTC−05:00

Junior	3–1	La Equidad
Bacca 11', 87'; Cortés 17'	Report	Castro 47'

Estadio Metropolitano Roberto Meléndez, Barranquilla
Referee: Wilmar Roldán

=== Top goalscorers ===
Pos	Player	Player nationality	Club	Goals
1	Carlos Bacca	Colombian	Junior	12
1	Carlos Rentería	Colombian	La Equidad	12
3	Franco Arizala	Colombian	Deportes Tolima	11
3	Giovanni Moreno	Colombian	Atlético Nacional	11
3	Fernando Uribe	Colombian	Once Caldas	11
6	Luis Muriel	Colombian	Deportivo Cali	9
7	Yovanny Arrechea	Colombian	Millonarios	8
7	Victor Cortes	Colombian	Junior	8
7	Mario Giménez	Paraguayan	Independiente Medellín	8
10	Luis Carlos Arias	Colombian	Independiente Medellín	7
10	Julián Barahona	Colombian	Deportivo Pereira	7
10	Anthony Tapia	Colombian	Boyacá Chicó	7

=== Statistics ===
- Total goals: 457
- Longest winning streak: 6 games — Deportes Tolima (March 20–April 17)
- Longest unbeaten streak: 10 games — Independiente Medellín (February 18–April 11);La Equidad (March 28–May 26)
- Longest losing streak: 8 games — Deportes Quindío (February 17–April 17)
- Biggest home win: Once Caldas 5–1 Deportivo Pereira (March 21)
- Biggest away win: Envigado 1–7 Independiente Medellín (March 28)
- Highest scoring: Envigado 1–7 Independiente Medellín (March 28)

== Campeonato Finalización ==
The Liga Postobon II began on July 17 and is ended on December 19.

=== First stage ===
==== Standings ====
Pos	Team	Pld	W	D	L	GF	GA	GD	Pts	Qualification
1	Deportes Tolima	18	11	3	4	35	15	+20	36	Cuadrangular Semifinals
2	Once Caldas	18	11	3	4	34	26	+8	36	Cuadrangular Semifinals
3	Santa Fe	18	10	5	3	26	13	+13	35	Cuadrangular Semifinals
4	Atlético Nacional	18	10	3	5	25	23	+2	33	Cuadrangular Semifinals
5	Quindío	18	9	4	5	25	20	+5	31	Cuadrangular Semifinals
6	Huila	18	8	6	4	28	24	+4	30	Cuadrangular Semifinals
7	Cúcuta Deportivo	18	8	4	6	24	18	+6	28	Cuadrangular Semifinals
8	La Equidad	18	8	4	6	23	23	0	28	Cuadrangular Semifinals
9	Deportivo Cali	18	6	8	4	31	23	+8	26	
10	América	18	7	4	7	25	23	+2	25	
11	Independiente Medellín	18	5	9	4	22	22	0	24	
12	Millonarios	18	6	4	8	25	25	0	22	
13	Boyacá Chicó	18	5	6	7	16	26	−10	21	
14	Junior	18	2	10	6	21	28	−7	16	
15	Real Cartagena	18	3	6	9	17	29	−12	15	
16	Cortuluá	18	3	4	11	14	30	−16	13	
17	Deportivo Pereira	18	0	9	9	12	22	−10	9	
18	Envigado	18	1	6	11	19	32	−13	9	

Updated to match(es) played on Nov 14, 2010. Source: golgolgol.net
Rules for classification: 1st points; 2nd goal difference; 3rd goals scored; 4th away goals scored; 5th away goals against; 6th draw

==== Results ====
Home \ Away	AME	HUI	NAC	BOY	COR	CUC	QUI	TOL	CAL	PER	ENV	DIM	JUN	EQU	MIL	ONC	RCA	SFE
América			2–0	4–0		0–0	1–1	1–0	1–2	1–1							0–2	1–2
Huila	1–1		2–2	4–0		4–1	1–0	3–1		3–2		1–1					2–1	
Atlético Nacional				2–0	2–1	1–0	1–0				1–1	1–0		3–1	2–1			0–1
Boyacá Chicó					1–0				1–0		2–1	3–3	1–0	0–0	1–1	0–1		2–0
Cortuluá	1–2	1–1					2–1		1–1		2–1		2–0	2–2	1–2	0–3		
Cúcuta Deportivo				2–0	3–0				2–1		2–0	1–2	3–3	2–0	2–1			1–1
Quindío				2–1	2–0	1–0			2–0		3–2			1–0	3–2			3–2
Deportes Tolima		3–0	3–0	3–1	3–0	1–0	2–0				2–0			3–0				1–2
Deportivo Cali	6–3	0–0	3–1					1–1		1–1		0–0	2–2			5–3	3–1	
Deportivo Pereira			0–0	2–2	0–0	1–2	0–0	1–2			1–1					0–0		0–1
Envigado	1–3	0–1				1–1			2–2				2–2	1–2	1–2	1–2	2–1	
Independiente Medellín	1–0		1–2		2–1			1–0		1–1	2–2			1–1	3–2		1–1	
Junior	0–2	1–1	4–2				0–2	1–1		2–1		1–1				2–2	1–1	
La Equidad	0–2	4–1		1–1					0–3	2–0			1–0		2–0	4–2	2–1	
Millonarios	2–0	1–2						2–2	1–0	2–1			1–1			1–2	4–0	0–0
Once Caldas	3–1	2–1	2–3			1–0	4–2	1–3		1–0		2–1					2–1	
Real Cartagena			1–2	0–0	1–0	0–2	1–1	1–4		1–0			1–1					2–2
Santa Fe		3–0			3–0				1–1		1–0	2–0	2–0	0–1	2–0	1–1		

Updated to match(es) played on unknown. Source: dimayor.com.co
Legend: Blue = home team win; Yellow = draw; Red = away team win.

=== Cuadrangular semifinals ===
==== Group A ====
Pos	Team	Pld	W	D	L	GF	GA	GD	Pts	Qualification	TOL	SFE	HUI	EQU
1	Deportes Tolima	6	3	2	1	11	9	+2	11	Finals		2–2	4–3	1–1
2	Santa Fe	6	3	1	2	8	6	+2	10		0–1		2–1	3–1
3	Huila	6	2	1	3	9	10	−1	7		2–3	1–0		2–1
4	La Equidad	6	1	2	3	4	7	−3	5		1–0	0–1	0–0	

Source: DIMAYOR and DIMAYOR
Legend: Blue = home team win; Yellow = draw; Red = away team win.
Rules for classification: 1) points; 2) goal difference; 3) number of goals scored.

==== Group B ====
Pos	Team	Pld	W	D	L	GF	GA	GD	Pts	Qualification	ONC	CUC	QUI	NAC
1	Once Caldas	6	4	1	1	14	7	+7	13	Finals		0–0	4–1	3–2
2	Cúcuta Deportivo	6	2	3	1	7	6	+1	9		2–1		1–0	2–2
3	Quindío	6	2	0	4	7	12	−5	6		1–3	2–1		1–2
4	Atlético Nacional	6	1	2	3	9	12	−3	5		1–3	1–1	1–2	

Source: DIMAYOR and DIMAYOR
Legend: Blue = home team win; Yellow = draw; Red = away team win.
Rules for classification: 1) points; 2) goal difference; 3) number of goals scored.

=== Finals ===
Pos	Team	Pld	W	D	L	GF	GA	GD	Pts	Qualification
1	Once Caldas	2	1	0	1	4	3	+1	3	2011 Copa Libertadores Second Stage
2	Deportes Tolima	2	1	0	1	3	4	−1	3	

Rules for classification: 1st points; 2nd goal difference; 3rd penalty shoot-out.
December 15, 2010
19:00 UTC−05:00

Deportes Tolima	2–1	Once Caldas
Medina 34'; Marangoni 48' (pen.)	Report	Moreno 6' (pen.)

Estadio Manuel Murillo Toro, Ibagué
Referee: Óscar Ruiz

December 19, 2010
17:30 UTC−05:00

Once Caldas	3–1	Deportes Tolima
Castrillon 45'; Uribe 53'; Mena 76'	Report	Aguilar 86'

Estadio Palogrande, Manizales
Referee: Wilmar Roldán

=== Top goalscorers ===
Pos	Player	Player nationality	Club	Goals
1	Wilder Medina	Colombian	Deportes Tolima	16
2	Dayro Moreno	Colombian	Once Caldas	16
3	Wilson Carpintero	Colombian	Cúcuta Deportivo	14
4	Fernando Uribe	Colombian	Once Caldas	13
5	Martín Morel	Argentine	Deportivo Cali	11
6	Yovanny Arrechea	Colombian	Millonarios	10
6	Jorge Perlaza	Colombian	Deportes Tolima	10
6	Carlos Rodas	Colombian	Deportes Quindío	10
8	Luis Carlos Arias	Colombian	Independiente Medellín	9
10	Giovanni Hernández	Colombian	Junior	8
10	Léider Preciado	Colombian	Deportes Quindío	8

=== Statistics ===
- Total goals: 498 goals
- Longest winning streak: 5 games — Millonarios (September 25–October 24); Deportes Tolima (September 25–October 22)
- Longest unbeaten streak: 15 games — Once Caldas (September 12–December 18)
- Longest losing streak: 7 games — Envigado (July 18–August 29)
- Biggest home win: Millonarios 4–0 Real Cartagena
- Biggest away win: Real Cartagena 1–4 Deportes Tolima
- Highest scoring: Deportivo Cali 6–3 América

== Aggregate table ==
Pos	Team	Pld	W	D	L	GF	GA	GD	Pts	Qualification or relegation
1	Deportes Tolima	46	25	11	10	88	53	+35	86	2011 Copa Libertadores First Stage
2	Once Caldas	44	23	8	13	84	64	+20	77	2011 Copa Libertadores Second Stage (Note: Junior and Once Caldas qualified for the 2011 Copa Libertadores as the tournament champions.)
3	Santa Fe	42	22	9	11	59	42	+17	75	2011 Copa Sudamericana First Stage
4	La Equidad	46	19	12	15	66	67	−1	69	2011 Copa Sudamericana First Stage
5	Atlético Nacional	42	20	7	15	62	57	+5	67	
6	Huila	42	16	13	13	67	60	+7	61	
7	Independiente Medellín	38	15	15	8	55	47	+8	60	
8	Cúcuta Deportivo	42	15	12	15	45	45	0	57	
9	Deportivo Cali	36	15	11	10	59	43	+16	56	2011 Copa Sudamericana Second Stage (Note: Deportivo Cali qualified for the 2011 Copa Sudamericana as the 2010 Copa Colombia champions.)
10	Junior	40	13	15	12	63	54	+9	54	2011 Copa Libertadores Second Stage
11	Quindío	42	15	6	21	41	54	−13	51	
12	Boyacá Chicó	36	13	11	12	36	50	−14	50	
13	Real Cartagena	36	11	10	15	41	55	−14	43	
14	Millonarios	36	11	8	17	47	54	−7	41	
15	América	36	11	8	17	43	51	−8	41	
16	Envigado (O)	36	7	11	18	42	62	−20	32	Relegation/promotion playoffs (Note: Cortulua was relegated for being last on the relegation table and Envigado was sent to the playoffs for being 17th.)
17	Cortuluá (R)	36	7	7	22	33	62	−29	28	Relegation to 2011 Primera B
18	Deportivo Pereira	36	4	15	17	35	50	−15	27	

Source: DIMAYOR (in Spanish)
Rules for classification: 1st points; 2nd goal difference; 3rd goals scored; 4th away goals scored; 5th away goals against; 6th draw
(O) Play-off winners; (R) Relegated

== Relegation table ==
Relegation was determined through an average of the points earn in the First Stages of the three season. For the purposes of the table, the 2009 Primera B winner (Cortuluá) entered with the same points as the team that was 16th in the beginning of the season (Real Cartagena). The team with the lowest average was relegated to the Categoría Primera B for the following season, and the team with the next lowest average played a playoff match against the 2010 Primera B runner-up.

Pos	Team	Pld	GF	GA	GD	Pts	Avg	Relegation
1	Deportes Tolima	108	159	126	+33	179	1.657	
2	Santa Fe	108	145	118	+27	173	1.602	
3	La Equidad	108	132	119	+13	169	1.565	
4	Independiente Medellín	108	148	119	+29	164	1.519	
5	Deportivo Cali	108	161	134	+27	162	1.5	
6	Junior	108	162	130	+32	161	1.491	
7	Boyacá Chicó	108	144	146	−2	156	1.444	
8	Atlético Nacional	108	126	129	−3	156	1.444	
9	Once Caldas	108	152	151	+1	152	1.407	
10	Atlético Huila	108	148	151	−3	146	1.352	
11	Deportes Quindío	108	120	140	−20	137	1.269	
12	Millonarios	108	136	135	+1	136	1.259	
13	Cúcuta Deportivo	108	98	112	−14	134	1.241	
14	América	108	146	146	0	133	1.231	
15	Real Cartagena	108	136	160	−24	133	1.231	
16	Deportivo Pereira	108	126	137	−11	128	1.185	
17	Envigado (O)	108	138	167	−29	123	1.139	Relegation/Promotion Playoff
18	Cortuluá (R)	108	128	167	−39	118	1.093	Relegated to the Primera B

Source: DIMAYOR (in Spanish)
Rules for classification: 1st average; 2nd goal difference; 3rd goals scored; 4th away goals for; 5th away goals against; 6th draw.

=== Relegation/promotion playoff ===
Teams			Scores		Tie-breakers		
Team #1	Points	Team #2	1st leg	2nd leg	GD	AG	Pen.
Envigado	6:0	Deportivo Pasto	1–0	2–0	—	—	—
