= Jaime Córdoba =

Jaime Córdoba may refer to:

- Jaime Córdoba (footballer)
- Jaime Córdoba (politician)
