= Derlis =

Derlis is a given name. Notable people with the name include:

- Derlis Alegre (born 1994), Paraguayan footballer
- Derlis Ayala (born 1990), Paraguayan long-distance runner
- Derlis Cardozo (born 1981), Paraguayan football defender
- Derlis David Meza Colli (born 1988), Paraguayan professional footballer
- Derlis Florentín (1984–2010), Paraguayan football striker
- Derlis Gómez (born 1972), retired Paraguayan footballer
- Derlis González (born 1994), Paraguayan professional footballer
- Derlis González (footballer, born 1978), Paraguayan footballer
- Derlis Orué (born 1990), Paraguayan professional footballer
- Derlis Paredes (born 1985), Paraguayan footballer
- Derlis Soto (born 1973), Paraguayan international footballer
