= Iván Macalik =

Argentine footballer

Personal information
- Full name: Iván Ricardo Macalik
- Date of birth: September 14, 1987 (age 39)
- Place of birth: Caseros, Argentina
- Height: 1.91 m (6 ft 3 in)
- Position: Centre back

Youth career
- Ferro Carril Oeste

Senior career*
Years	Team	Apps	(Gls)
2005–2007	Ferro Carril Oeste	72	(3)
2008–2011	Lanús	4	(0)
2010	→ Unión San Felipe (loan)	7	(0)
2010–2011	→ San Martín SJ (loan)	0	(0)
2011–2012	Temperley	28	(1)
2012–2015	Almagro	12	(0)
Total		123	(4)
- * Club domestic league appearances and goals

Iván Ricardo Macalik (born 14 September 1987) is an Argentine former footballer who played as a defender. He played in the Primera División for Lanús.

== Career ==
Macalik began his playing career in 2005 with Ferro Carril Oeste of the Argentine 2nd division. In 2008, he was signed by Lanús but only made 4 first team appearances between 2008 and 2010. His only goal came in a 1–1 draw against Caracas F.C. in Copa Libertadores 2009.

Abroad, Macalik had a stint with Chilean club Unión San Felipe.

His last club was Almagro in 2015.
