= 2009 Copa Libertadores =

50th season of Copa Libertadores

2009 Copa Libertadores de América
2009 Copa Libertadores da América

Tournament details
- Dates: January 27 - July 15
- Teams: 38 (from 11 associations)

Final positions
- Champions: (Argentina) Estudiantes (LP) (4th title)
- Runners-up: (Brazil) Cruzeiro

Tournament statistics
- Matches played: 134
- Goals scored: 323 (2.41 per match)
- Attendance: 2,416,216 (18,031 per match)
- Top scorer: (Argentina) Mauro Boselli (8 goals)
- Best player: (Argentina) Juan Sebastián Verón

The 2009 Copa Libertadores de América (officially the 2009 Copa Santander Libertadores de América for sponsorship reasons) was the 50th edition of the Copa Libertadores de América, CONMEBOL's premier annual international club tournament.

The tournament was won by Argentine club Estudiantes de La Plata, who achieved their fourth Copa Libertadores title and first in 39 years. Since the inception of a preliminary round in 2004, they are the first club to start in that round and win the Copa Libertadores. Estudiantes earned a berth to play in 2010 Recopa Sudamericana and in the 2009 FIFA Club World Cup but lost both titles to LDU Quito and Barcelona respectively.

== Qualified teams ==
Association	Team	Qualification method
(Argentina) Argentina; 5 berths	Lanús	2007 Apertura champion
(Argentina) Argentina; 5 berths	River Plate	2008 Clausura champion
(Argentina) Argentina; 5 berths	Boca Juniors	2008 Apertura champion
(Argentina) Argentina; 5 berths	San Lorenzo	Best average of the 2007 Apertura, 2008 Clausura, & 2008 Apertura
(Argentina) Argentina; 5 berths	Estudiantes (LP)	2nd best average of the 2007 Apertura, 2008 Clausura, & 2008 Apertura
(Bolivia) Bolivia; 3 berths	Universitario de Sucre	2008 Apertura champion
(Bolivia) Bolivia; 3 berths	Aurora	2008 Clausura champion
(Bolivia) Bolivia; 3 berths	Real Potosí	2008 play-off champion
(Brazil) Brazil; 5 berths	São Paulo	Campeonato Brasileiro Série A 2008 champion
(Brazil) Brazil; 5 berths	Grêmio	Campeonato Brasileiro Série A 2008 runner-up
(Brazil) Brazil; 5 berths	Cruzeiro	Campeonato Brasileiro Série A 2008 3rd place
(Brazil) Brazil; 5 berths	Sport Recife	2008 Copa do Brasil champion
(Brazil) Brazil; 5 berths	Palmeiras	Campeonato Brasileiro Série A 2008 4th place
(Chile) Chile; 3 berths	Everton	2008 Apertura champion
(Chile) Chile; 3 berths	Colo-Colo	2008 Clausura champion
(Chile) Chile; 3 berths	Universidad de Chile	1st place in 2008 Clausura general table
(Colombia) Colombia; 3 berths	Boyacá Chicó	2008 Apertura champion
(Colombia) Colombia; 3 berths	América	2008 Finalización champion
(Colombia) Colombia; 3 berths	Independiente Medellín	2008 Primera A best-placed non-champion
(Ecuador) Ecuador; 3 + 1 berths	LDU Quito	2008 Copa Libertadores champion
(Ecuador) Ecuador; 3 + 1 berths	Deportivo Quito	2008 Serie A champion
(Ecuador) Ecuador; 3 + 1 berths	Deportivo Cuenca	2008 Serie A 3rd place
(Ecuador) Ecuador; 3 + 1 berths	El Nacional	2008 Serie A 4th place
(Paraguay) Paraguay; 3 berths	Libertad	2008 Apertura & 2008 Clausura champion
(Paraguay) Paraguay; 3 berths	Guaraní	2008 Primera División best-placed non-champion
(Paraguay) Paraguay; 3 berths	Nacional	2008 Primera División 2nd best-placed non-champion
(Peru) Peru; 3 berths	Universitario	2008 Apertura champion
(Peru) Peru; 3 berths	Universidad San Martín	2008 Clausura champion
(Peru) Peru; 3 berths	Sporting Cristal	2008 Descentralizado best-placed non-champion
(Uruguay) Uruguay; 3 berths	Defensor Sporting	2007–08 Primera División champion
(Uruguay) Uruguay; 3 berths	Nacional	2008 Liguilla Pre-Libertadores champion
(Uruguay) Uruguay; 3 berths	Peñarol	2008 Liguilla Pre-Libertadores 3rd place
(Venezuela) Venezuela; 3 berths	Deportivo Táchira	2007–08 Primera División champion
(Venezuela) Venezuela; 3 berths	Caracas	2007–08 Primera División runner-up
(Venezuela) Venezuela; 3 berths	Deportivo Anzoátegui	2007–08 Primera División best-placed non-finalist
(Mexico) Mexico; 3 invitees (CONCACAF)	San Luis	1st place in 2008 Apertura general table
(Mexico) Mexico; 3 invitees (CONCACAF)	Guadalajara	2009 InterLiga champion
(Mexico) Mexico; 3 invitees (CONCACAF)	Pachuca	2009 InterLiga runner-up

== Round and draw dates ==
The calendar shows the dates of the rounds and draw. All events occurred in 2009 unless otherwise stated.

Stage	Draw date	First leg	Second leg
First stage	November 25, 2008	January 27–29	February 3–5
Second stage	November 25, 2008	February 10 – April 30	
Round of 16	N/A	May 5–14	May 12–21
Quarterfinals	N/A	May 27–28	June 17–18
Semifinals	N/A	June 24–25	July 1–2
Finals	N/A	July 8	July 15

== Tie-breaking criteria ==
At each stage of the tournament teams receive 3 points for a win, 1 point for a draw, and no points for a loss. If two or more teams are equal on points, the following criteria will be applied to determine the rankings in the group stage:

1. superior goal difference;
2. higher number of goals scored;
3. higher number of away goals scored;
4. draw.

For the first stage, round of 16, quarterfinals, and semifinals, the fourth criterion is replaced by a penalty shootout if necessary. The finals have their own set of criteria; see the finals section for more details.

== First stage ==
In the First Stage, twelve teams played a two-legged tie (one game at home and one game away) against another opponent. The winner of each tie advanced to the Second Stage. Team #1 played the second leg at home.

Teams			Scores		Tie-breakers		
Team #1	Points	Team #2	1st leg	2nd leg	GD	AG	Pen.
Peñarol (Uruguay)	1:4	(Colombia) Independiente Medellín	0–4	0–0	—	—	—
Estudiantes (LP) (Argentina)	3:3	(Peru) Sporting Cristal	1–2	1–0	0:0	1:0	—
Nacional (Paraguay)	4:1	(Ecuador) El Nacional	5–0	3–3	—	—	—
Deportivo Cuenca (Ecuador)	3:3	(Venezuela) Deportivo Anzoátegui	0–2	3–0	+1:−1	—	—
Real Potosí (Bolivia)	0:6	(Brazil) Palmeiras	1–5	0–2	—	—	—
Pachuca (Mexico)	3:3	Universidad de Chile	0–1	2–1	0:0	0:1	—

== Second stage ==
A total of 26 teams qualified directly to this phase and were joined by six teams from the First Stage, bringing the total to 32 teams. The top two teams from each group advanced to the Third Stage.

=== Group 1 ===
Pos	Team	Pld	W	D	L	GF	GA	GD	Pts	(Brazil) RFE	(Brazil) PAL	(Chile) CC	(Ecuador) LDU
1	(Brazil) Sport Recife	6	4	1	1	10	7	+3	13	—	0–2	2–1	2–0
2	(Brazil) Palmeiras	6	3	1	2	9	7	+2	10	1–1	—	1–3	2–0
3	(Chile) Colo-Colo	6	2	1	3	9	7	+2	7	1–2	0–1	—	3–0
4	(Ecuador) LDU Quito	6	1	1	4	6	13	−7	4	2–3	3–2	1–1	—

=== Group 2 ===
Pos	Team	Pld	W	D	L	GF	GA	GD	Pts	(Argentina) BOC	(Ecuador) CUE	(Venezuela) TÁC	(Paraguay) GDL
1	(Argentina) Boca Juniors	6	5	0	1	11	3	+8	15	—	1–0	3–0	3–1
2	(Ecuador) Deportivo Cuenca	6	3	1	2	9	4	+5	10	1–0	—	3–1	4–0
3	(Venezuela) Deportivo Táchira	6	3	0	3	6	9	−3	9	0–1	1–0	—	2–1
4	(Paraguay) Guaraní	6	0	1	5	5	15	−10	1	1–3	1–1	1–2	—

=== Group 3 ===
Pos	Team	Pld	W	D	L	GF	GA	GD	Pts	(Uruguay) NAC	(Peru) USM	(Argentina) RIV	(Paraguay) NPR
1	(Uruguay) Nacional	6	4	2	0	12	3	+9	14	—	2–1	3–0	3–1
2	(Peru) Universidad San Martín	6	2	2	2	7	9	−2	8	1–1	—	2–1	2–1
3	(Argentina) River Plate	6	2	1	3	7	9	−2	7	0–0	3–0	—	1–0
4	(Paraguay) Nacional	6	1	1	4	7	12	−5	4	0–3	1–1	4–2	—

=== Group 4 ===
Pos	Team	Pld	W	D	L	GF	GA	GD	Pts	(Brazil) SPO	(Uruguay) DEF	(Colombia) DIM	(Colombia) AMC
1	(Brazil) São Paulo	6	4	1	1	10	6	+4	13	—	2–1	1–1	2–1
2	(Uruguay) Defensor Sporting	6	2	2	2	5	5	0	8	0–1	—	4–3	1–0
3	(Colombia) Independiente Medellín	6	1	4	1	6	6	0	7	2–1	0–0	—	0–0
4	(Colombia) América de Cali	6	0	3	3	3	7	−4	3	1–3	0–0	1–1	—

=== Group 5 ===
Pos	Team	Pld	W	D	L	GF	GA	GD	Pts	(Brazil) CRU	(Argentina) ELP	(Ecuador) QUI	(Bolivia) UNI
1	(Brazil) Cruzeiro	6	4	1	1	9	5	+4	13	—	3–0	2–0	2–0
2	(Argentina) Estudiantes	6	3	1	2	9	4	+5	10	4–0	—	4–0	1–0
3	(Ecuador) Deportivo Quito	6	2	2	2	6	9	−3	8	1–1	1–0	—	3–1
4	(Bolivia) Universitario de Sucre	6	0	2	4	2	8	−6	2	0–1	0–0	1–1	—

=== Group 6 ===
Pos	Team	Pld	W	D	L	GF	GA	GD	Pts	(Venezuela) CAR	(Mexico) GDL	(Chile) EVE	(Argentina) LAN
1	(Venezuela) Caracas	6	3	1	2	7	4	+3	10	—	2–0	1–0	3–1
2	(Mexico) Guadalajara	6	2	3	1	9	6	+3	9	1–0	—	6–2	0–0
3	(Chile) Everton	6	2	2	2	7	10	−3	8	1–0	1–1	—	1–1
4	(Argentina) Lanús	6	0	4	2	5	8	−3	4	1–1	1–1	1–2	—

=== Group 7 ===
Pos	Team	Pld	W	D	L	GF	GA	GD	Pts	(Brazil) GRÊ	(Chile) UCH	(Colombia) BOY	(Bolivia) AUR
1	(Brazil) Grêmio	6	5	1	0	11	1	+10	16	—	0–0	3–0	3–0
2	Universidad de Chile	6	3	1	2	8	6	+2	10	0–2	—	3–0	3–0
3	(Colombia) Boyacá Chicó	6	3	0	3	8	8	0	9	0–1	3–0	—	2–1
4	(Bolivia) Aurora	6	0	0	6	3	15	−12	0	1–2	1–2	0–3	—

=== Group 8 ===
Pos	Team	Pld	W	D	L	GF	GA	GD	Pts	(Paraguay) LIB	(Mexico) SLU	(Peru) UNI	(Argentina) SLO
1	(Paraguay) Libertad	6	4	0	2	7	5	+2	12	—	0–2	2–1	2–0
2	(Mexico) San Luis	6	2	2	2	7	7	0	8	0–1	—	2–2	2–0
3	(Peru) Universitario	6	2	2	2	6	7	−1	8	2–1	0–0	—	1–0
4	(Argentina) San Lorenzo	6	2	0	4	6	7	−1	6	0–1	4–1	2–0	—

== Knockout stages ==
The last four stages of the tournament (round of 16, quarterfinals, semifinals, and finals) form a single-elimination tournament, commonly known as a knockout stage. Sixteen teams advanced into the first of these stages: the third stage.

=== Seeding ===
The 16 qualified teams were seeded according to their results in the Second Stage. The top teams from each group were seeded 1–8, with the team with the most points as seed 1 and the team with the least as seed 8. The second-best teams from each group were seeded 9–16, with the team with the most points as seed 9 and the team with the least as seed 16.

Teams qualified as a group winner
Seed	Team	Pts	GD	GF	AG
1	(Brazil) Grêmio	16	+10	11	5
2	(Argentina) Boca Juniors	15	+8	11	4
3	(Uruguay) Nacional	14	+9	12	4
4	(Brazil) São Paulo	13	+4	10	5
5	(Brazil) Cruzeiro	13	+4	9	2
6	(Brazil) Sport Recife	13	+3	10	6
7	(Paraguay) Libertad	12	+2	7	3
8	(Venezuela) Caracas	10	+3	7	1

Teams qualified as a runner-up
Seed	Team	Pts	GD	GF	AG
9	(Ecuador) Deportivo Cuenca	10	+5	9	1
10	(Argentina) Estudiantes (LP)	10	+5	9	0
11	(Brazil) Palmeiras	10	+2	9	5
12	Universidad de Chile	10	+2	8	2
13	(Mexico) Guadalajara	9	+3	9	2
14	(Mexico) San Luis	8	0	7	0
15	(Uruguay) Defensor Sporting	8	0	5	1
16	(Peru) Universidad San Martín	8	−2	7	2

=== Bracket ===
Round of 16
1	(Brazil) Grêmio	3	2
16	(Peru) Universidad San Martín	1	0
8	(Venezuela) Caracas	1	4
9	(Ecuador) Cuenca	2	0
4	(Brazil) São Paulo	–	–
13	(Mexico) Guadalajara	–	–
5	(Brazil) Cruzeiro	2	1
12	U. de Chile	1	0
3	(Uruguay) Nacional	–	–
14	(Mexico) San Luis	–	–
6	(Brazil) Sport Recife	0	1 (1)
11	(Brazil) Palmeiras (p)	1	0 (3)
7	(Paraguay) Libertad	0	0
10	(Argentina) Estudiantes (LP)	3	0
2	(Argentina) Boca Juniors	2	0
15	(Uruguay) Defensor Sporting	2	1

Quarterfinals
1	(Brazil) Grêmio (a)	1	0
8	(Venezuela) Caracas	1	0
4	(Brazil) São Paulo	1	0
5	(Brazil) Cruzeiro	2	2
3	(Uruguay) Nacional (a)	1	0
11	(Brazil) Palmeiras	1	0
10	(Argentina) Estudiantes	1	1
15	(Uruguay) Defensor Sporting	0	0

Semifinals
1	(Brazil) Grêmio	1	2
5	(Brazil) Cruzeiro	3	2
3	(Uruguay) Nacional	0	1
10	(Argentina) Estudiantes	1	2

Finals
5	(Brazil) Cruzeiro	0	1
10	(Argentina) Estudiantes	0	2

=== Round of 16 ===
The first match of the Round of 16 began on 5 May, with the last match played on 21 May. Team #1, as the higher seeded team, played the second leg at home.

Teams			Scores		Tie-breakers		
Team #1	Points	Team #2	1st leg	2nd leg	GD	AG	Pen.
Grêmio (Brazil)	6:0	(Peru) Universidad San Martín	3–1	2–0	—	—	—
Boca Juniors (Argentina)	1:4	(Uruguay) Defensor Sporting	2–2	0–1	—	—	—
Nacional (Uruguay)	w/o^{[A]}	(Mexico) San Luis	—	—	—	—	—
São Paulo (Brazil)	w/o^{[A]}	(Mexico) Guadalajara	—	—	—	—	—
Cruzeiro (Brazil)	6:0	Universidad de Chile	2–1	1–0	—	—	—
Sport Recife (Brazil)	3:3	(Brazil) Palmeiras	0–1	1–0	0:0	0:0	1:3
Libertad (Paraguay)	1:4	(Argentina) Estudiantes	0–3	0–0	—	—	—
Caracas (Venezuela)	3:3	(Ecuador) Deportivo Cuenca	1–2	4–0	+3:−3	—	—

=== Quarterfinals ===
Team #1, as the higher seeded team, played the second leg at home.

Teams			Scores		Tie-breakers		
Team #1	Points	Team #2	1st leg	2nd leg	GD	AG	Pen.
Grêmio (Brazil)	2:2	(Venezuela) Caracas	1–1	0–0	0:0	1:0	—
Nacional (Uruguay)	2:2	(Brazil) Palmeiras	1–1	0–0	0:0	1:0	—
São Paulo (Brazil)	0:6	(Brazil) Cruzeiro	1–2	0–2	—	—	—
Estudiantes (Argentina)	6:0	(Uruguay) Defensor Sporting	1–0	1–0	—	—	—

=== Semifinals ===
Team #1, as the higher seeded team, played the second leg at home.

Teams			Scores		Tie-breakers		
Team #1	Points	Team #2	1st leg	2nd leg	GD	AG	Pen.
Grêmio (Brazil)	1:4	(Brazil) Cruzeiro	1–3	2–2	—	—	—
Nacional (Uruguay)	0:6	(Argentina) Estudiantes (LP)	0–1	1–2	—	—	—

=== Finals ===
July 8, 2009
21:50 UTC−03:00

Estudiantes (LP) (Argentina)	0–0	(Brazil) Cruzeiro
	Report

Estadio Ciudad de La Plata, La Plata
Attendance: 52,000
Referee: Jorge Larrionda (Uruguay)

July 15, 2009
21:50 UTC−03:00

Cruzeiro (Brazil)	1–2	(Argentina) Estudiantes (LP)
Henrique 52'	Report	Fernández 57'; Boselli 72'

Estádio Governador Magalhães Pinto (Mineirão), Belo Horizonte
Attendance: 65,000
Referee: Carlos Chandía (Chile)

Copa Libertadores de América
2009 Champion

Estudiantes (LP)
Fourth Title

== Top goalscorers ==
Pos	Player	Team	Goals
1	(Argentina) Mauro Boselli	(Argentina) Estudiantes (LP)	8
2	(Paraguay) Jorge Núñez	(Paraguay) Nacional	7
2	(Brazil) Rodrigo Teixeira	(Ecuador) Deportivo Cuenca	7
4	(Brazil) Keirrison	(Brazil) Palmeiras	6
4	(Brazil) Souza	(Brazil) Grêmio	6
6	(Brazil) Borges	(Brazil) São Paulo	5
6	(Argentina) Darío Figueroa	(Venezuela) Caracas	5
6	(Argentina) Rodrigo Palacio	(Argentina) Boca Juniors	5
6	(Argentina) Martín Palermo	(Argentina) Boca Juniors	5
6	(Brazil) Wellington Paulista	(Brazil) Cruzeiro	5

== Footnotes ==
A. Guadalajara and San Luis withdrew from the tournament following concerns raised by both Nacional and São Paulo over the H1N1 flu outbreak in Mexico, South American teams refused to travel to Mexico to play the match; no agreement was reached on alternative venues for the first-leg matches, both scheduled to be played in Mexico. Both Guadalajara and San Luis were later secured a place in the round of 16 for the 2010 Copa Libertadores.
