= Fernando Monroy =

Colombian footballer (born 1980)

Personal information
- Date of birth: 28 December 1980 (age 45)
- Place of birth: Cali, Colombia
- Height: 1.65 m (5 ft 5 in)
- Position: Defender

Senior career*
Years	Team	Apps	(Gls)
2003–2007	Deportivo Pasto		
2007	Cortuluá		
2008	Millonarios		
2009	América de Cali		
2010	Itagui Ditaires		
2011	Alianza Atlético	19	(0)
2012	Atlético Bucaramanga	32	(4)
2013	Llaneros	35	(3)
- * Club domestic league appearances and goals as of 24 January 2013

Fernando Monroy (born 28 December 1980) is a Colombian former footballer who played as a defender.
