= Marco Canchila =

Colombian footballer (born 1981)

Personal information
- Full name: Marco Antonio Canchila Vasquez
- Date of birth: January 6, 1981 (age 45)
- Place of birth: Bogotá, Colombia
- Position: Midfielder

Senior career*
Years	Team	Apps	(Gls)
1999–2001	Real Cartagena		
2001	Almirante Brown		
2002–2003	Real Cartagena		
2004–2006	América de Cali		
2007	Real Cartagena		
2008	Once Caldas		
2008–2012	La Equidad	91	(0)
2013–2014	Atlético Huila	39	(1)
2015–2016	Fortaleza CEIF	58	(1)
2017	Unión Magdalena	14	(0)
- * Club domestic league appearances and goals

Marco Antonio Canchila Vasquez (born January 6, 1981) is a Colombian retired footballer who played as a midfielder.
