= Jaime Bustamante =

Colombian-born Venezuelan footballer (born 1980)

Personal information
- Full name: Jaime Andrés Bustamante Suárez
- Date of birth: 21 April 1980 (age 46)
- Place of birth: Cúcuta, Colombia
- Height: 1.87 m (6 ft 1 1/2 in)
- Position: Defender

Senior career*
Years	Team	Apps	(Gls)
2001–2005	Millonarios	31	(1)
2005–2012	Caracas	80	(7)
2012	Zamora	14	(1)
2012–2013	São Caetano	7	(0)
2013–2015	Aragua	63	(6)

International career^{‡}
2010–	Venezuela	5	(0)
- * Club domestic league appearances and goals as of 19:43, 13 June 2012 (UTC) ‡ National team caps and goals as of 19:43, 13 June 2012 (UTC)

Jaime Andrés Bustamante Suárez (born 21 April 1980) is a Colombian born – Venezuelan international footballer who plays as a defender.

== Club career ==
Bustamante has played for Millonarios, Caracas FC and Zamora FC. He signed for Brazilian club São Caetano in June 2012.

== International career ==
He made his international debut for Venezuela in 2010.
