= Luis Carlos Arias =

Colombian footballer (born 1985)

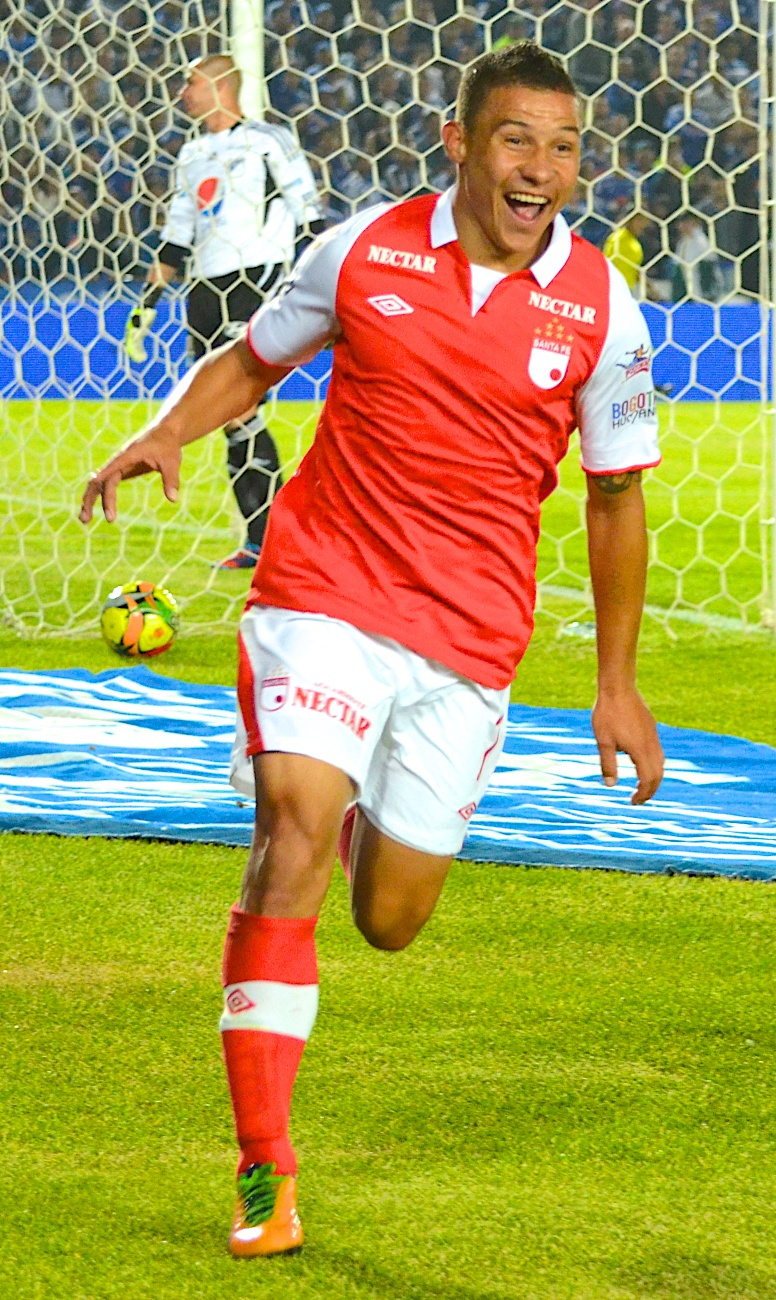

Personal information
- Full name: Luis Carlos Arias Cardona
- Date of birth: 13 January 1985 (age 41)
- Place of birth: La Unión, Antioquia, Colombia
- Height: 1.70 m (5 ft 7 in)
- Position: Left midfielder

Team information
- Current team: Nacional Potosí
- Number: 11

Youth career
- Deportivo Rionegro

Senior career*
Years	Team	Apps	(Gls)
2006–2008	Deportivo Rionegro	57	(9)
2009–2011	Medellín	89	(23)
2010–2011	→ Toluca (loan)	9	(0)
2012–2015	Santa Fe	94	(18)
2015–2018	Medellín	74	(9)
2018	Deportivo Pasto	25	(1)
2019	Unión Magdalena	37	(5)
2020–	Nacional Potosí	4	(0)

International career
2010	Colombia	1	(0)
- * Club domestic league appearances and goals as of 16:42, 25 May 2020 (UTC)

Luis Carlos Arias Cardona (born January 13, 1985) is a Colombian footballer who currently plays as a left midfielder for Nacional Potosí.

== Club career ==
=== At the beginning of his career ===
He started his career in Rionegro-Antioquia, where he had played from 2006 to 2008. Due to his performance he was recruited by DIM.

=== Independiente Medellín ===
In 2009, he was brought in to strengthen DIM, in which he was an important player in gaining its fifth title in the 2009 Categoría Primera season. During that year, he scored the best goal of his career, which made his team win the game against Cúcuta Deportivo with a score 2–1. One year later, he played in Copa Libertadores for the first time in his career. After playing two years in Medellín, he left Independiente Medellín to move to Deportivo Toluca of Mexico. However, his career did not thrive in that club, so he returned to Independiente Medellín, the same one that had him under contract.

=== Return to Medellín ===
For the second semester of 2011, it was decided to loan him to Deportes Tolima, but finally, as the player was going to be borrowed and not sold to the Tolima club, he came back to Medallo to play Torneo finalización 2011.

=== Independiente Santa Fe ===
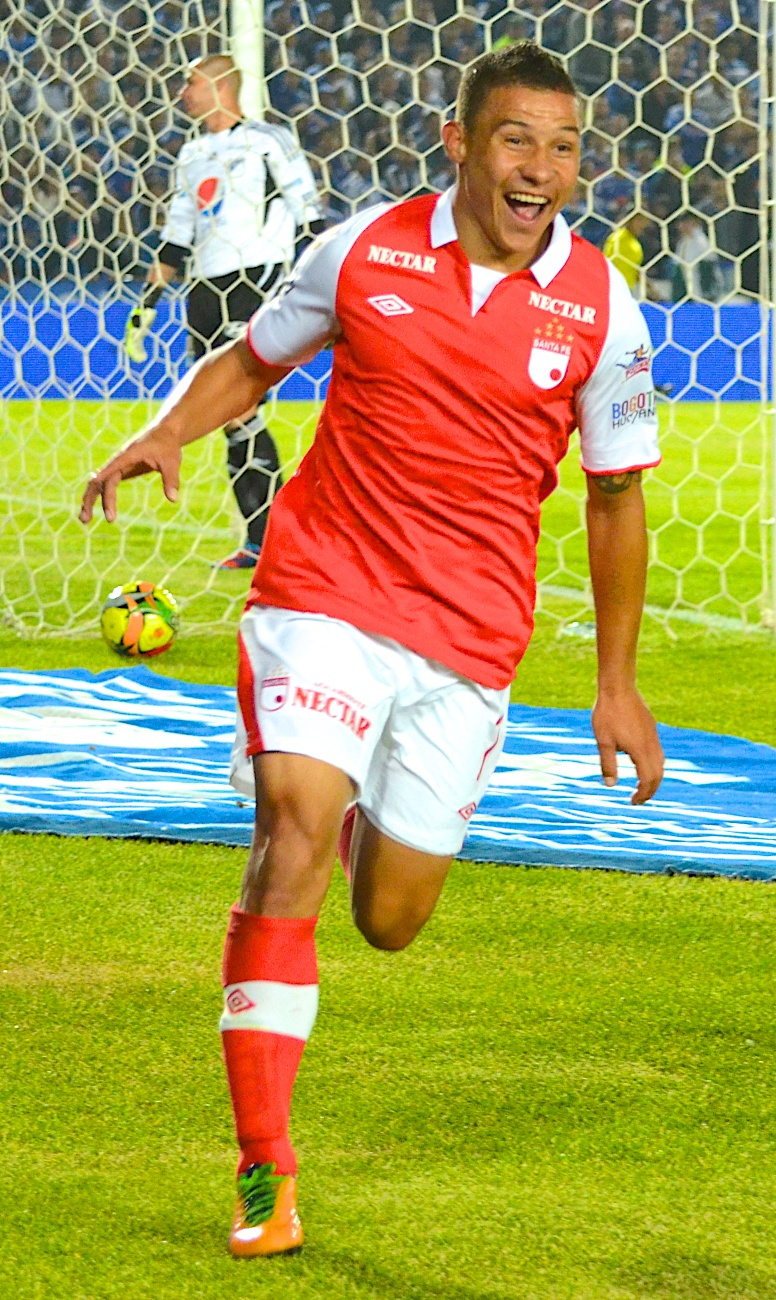
On January 4, 2012, his transfer to Santa Fe was confirmed. During his first year in one of the clubs from the Colombian capital city, he played a major part in securing the team's seventh star at Torneo Apertura, ending 36 years of failure to gain a title in the league. In 2013, he won his second title with the team, Superliga del 2013, making two essential goals. In that year, Luis played in the League and in Copa Libertadores. However, he was injured during the quarter-finals, and was unable to play for a period. During the first semester of 2014, he recovered from his injury to play in Copa Libertadores and Liga Postobon. In the second semester, he managed to get the eight-Liga Postobon-title teaming up with Daniel Torres, Omar Pérez, Francisco Meza, Juan Daniel Roa and Luis Manuel Seijas, in a final against the paisa team, Independiente Medellín, whom he scored the goal that assured his team's victory. He continued in Independiente Santa Fe until 2015, then returned to Independiente Medellín.

=== Independiente Medellín ===
In 2015, former DIM's coach, Leonel Álvarez, brought him back to the club for the Torneo Finalización 2015, where the team reached the semi-finals before being eliminated Atlético Nacional. In 2016, during the Torneo Apertura, he delivered a strong, overall performance compared to his 2009 season. That year he scarpered a free-kick goal against Atlético Huila, that was later highlighted by the sports channel, Win Sports. Some Independiente Medellin fan websites have described him as an important figure to teh club.

== Career statistics ==
As of match played on 7 April 2018

Appearances and goals by club, season and competition
Club	Season	League			Cup		League Cup		Other		Total	
Club	Season	Division	Apps	Goals	Apps	Goals	Apps	Goals	Apps	Goals	Apps	Goals
Independiente Medellín	2009	Categoría Primera A	39	6	0	0	—		8	2	47	8
Independiente Medellín	2010	Categoría Primera A	34	16	0	0	—		5	1	39	17
Independiente Medellín	2011	Categoría Primera A	16	1	0	0	—				16	1
Independiente Medellín	Total		89	23	0	0	0	0	13	3	102	26
Toluca (loan)	2010–11	Mexican Primera División	9	0	0	0	—		1	0	10	0
Santa Fe	2012	Categoría Primera A	26	3	10	1	—				36	4
Santa Fe	2013	Categoría Primera A	20	4	0	0	—		8	2	28	6
Santa Fe	2014	Categoría Primera A	39	10	14	4	—		7	0	60	14
Santa Fe	2015	Categoría Primera A	9	1	0	0	—		8	1	17	2
Santa Fe	Total		94	18	24	5	0	0	23	3	141	26
Independiente Medellín	2015	Categoría Primera A	10	2	4	0	—				14	2
Independiente Medellín	2016	Categoría Primera A	39	5	5	0	—		5	2	49	7
Independiente Medellín	2017	Categoría Primera A	25	2	1	0	—		9	0	35	2
Independiente Medellín	Total		74	9	10	0	0	0	14	2	98	11
Deportivo Pasto	2018	Categoría Primera A	12	0	0	0	—				12	0
Career totals			278	50	34	5	0	0	51	8	363	63
