= Keirrison =

Brazilian footballer

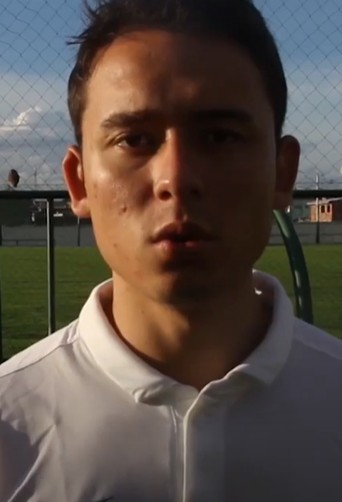
- Keirrison in 2013

Personal information
- Full name: Keirrison de Souza Carneiro
- Date of birth: 3 December 1988 (age 37)
- Place of birth: Dourados, Brazil
- Height: 1.74 m (5 ft 9 in)
- Position: Forward

Youth career
- 2002–2005: CENE
- 2005–2006: Coritiba

Senior career*
Years	Team	Apps	(Gls)
2006–2009	Coritiba	63	(33)
2009	Palmeiras	7	(5)
2009–2014	Barcelona	0	(0)
2009–2010	→ Benfica (loan)	5	(0)
2010	→ Fiorentina (loan)	10	(2)
2010–2011	→ Santos (loan)	13	(4)
2011–2012	→ Cruzeiro (loan)	8	(1)
2012–2014	→ Coritiba (loan)	9	(1)
2014–2015	Coritiba	17	(3)
2016	Londrina	27	(7)
2017	Arouca	2	(0)
2017–2018	Coritiba	5	(0)
2018	Londrina	3	(0)
- * Club domestic league appearances and goals

Keirrison de Souza Carneiro (born 3 December 1988), nicknamed "K9", is a Brazilian former professional footballer who played as a forward.

== Club career ==
=== Coritiba ===
Keirrison became a regular in Coritiba's main squad in 2007, helping the club win the Campeonato Brasileiro Série B and being promoted to the following year's Campeonato Brasileiro Série A. He was the club's top goalscorer in that competition with 12 goals. He was also the top goalscorer of the Campeonato Paranaense in 2008 with 18 goals. He played his first Série A match on 11 May 2008, when his club beat Palmeiras 2–0, although he suffered an injury in the match. He scored his first goal for the club on 9 July 2008 in a 4–0 win over Portuguesa. His first goal came less than a month later in a 0–0 win over Santos on 3 August 2008. Keirrison finished as the Campeonato Brasileiro Série A 2008's top goalscorer with 23 goals, tied with Washington of Fluminense and Kléber Pereira of Santos, being the youngest top scorer in the history of Brazil.

=== Palmeiras ===
Keirrison joined Palmeiras in January 2009. He made his club debut on 24 January 2009 against Mogi Mirim, scoring twice in the 3–0 win. then twice in the preliminary round of the Copa Libertadores as Palmeiras beat Real Potosí 1–1 on 29 January 2010. On 26 June, it said on Palmeiras' official website that Barcelona had made an offer for the striker.

=== Barcelona ===
On 23 July 2009, Barcelona announced on its website it had agreed to terms with Palmeiras to bring Keirrison to the Camp Nou. The transfer was worth €14 million plus a bonus up to €2 million contingent on the number of matches Keirrison played with the first team. Keirrison signed on a five-year contract. On arrival at the Spanish club, Keirrison expressed his adulation he had for his new club and was quoted as saying in Barcelona's official website, "I hope to break into [Barcelona head coach] Pep Guardiola's side, and join many other famous Brazilians who have played here." He added, "I always followed Barcelona and the Brazilian players who played here. Now at 20 years old, I am very happy to be here, fulfilling my dream of playing at the best club in the world." However, soon after, Guardiola stated "in principle he'll go out on loan". Many teams throughout Europe were linked with Keirrison after hearing of Barcelona's plan to loan-out the Brazilian in order to acclimatize him to European football, including Roma, Monaco and Ajax.

In articles published several years following his arrival at Barcelona, Keirrison was chosen as one of the worst signings in the history of the club.

==== Loan to Benfica ====
On 28 July 2009, it was announced Portuguese Primeira Liga club Benfica agreed on terms to take the Brazilian on loan for the 2009–10 season. Keirrison scored his first goal for Benfica in a friendly against Celtic. However, with the abundance of strikers in form at Benfica, Keirrison found it hard to break into the first team; to some, Keirrison was behind Óscar Cardozo, Nuno Gomes and Javier Saviola in the pecking order at the Estádio da Luz. While in Portugal, Keirrison started one match for Benfica and played a total of just 199 minutes. In January 2010, then Benfica manager Jorge Jesus even went as far as to say that he did not plan to play Keirrison for the remainder of the season. Nonetheless, Keirisson became a Portuguese champion thanks to the five league matches he featured in for Primeira Liga winners Benfica.

==== Loan to Fiorentina ====
On 31 January 2010, Fiorentina announced on its website it had come to terms with Barcelona to take Keirrison on loan until the end of the 2011–12 season. Barcelona also granted La Viola an option to purchase Keirrison outright, after his loan, for €14 million. On 7 February 2010, just one week after being signed, Keirrison made his official debut for La Viola after coming on as a substitute for Manuel Pasqual in the 84th minute in a 1–0 loss against Roma. On 21 February, Keirrison came on as a substitute for Marco Marchionni in the 76th minute in a match against Livorno; Fiorentina went on to win that match 2–1. On 28 February, he replaced Adem Ljajić in the 46th minute against Lazio and he later went on to score the equalizer in the 92nd minute, his first goal for Fiorentina.

==== Return to Brazil ====
On 10 July 2010, Keirrison's loan with Fiorentina was terminated prematurely, and on 12 July, he was loaned by Barcelona to Brazilian side Santos.

With Santos, Keirrison won the 2011 Copa Libertadores, but as a reserve. In August 2011, he was loaned to Cruzeiro until the end of the 2011 Brazilian season.

In March 2012, Keirrison was loaned to his original club, Coritiba, until the end of the 2013–14 season.

=== Permanent move to Coritiba ===
On 7 March 2014, Keirrison agreed a free transfer with Coritiba which was validated on 1 July, after his contract with Barcelona terminated.

In September 2015, Keirrison went to court against Coritiba requesting unpaid wages and medical expenses from a surgery to recover from an injury. In November, after the club claimed to have paid the debt, Keirrison said he would not play in the next match against Figueirense, claiming he "would not be ready". One director told the reason might be that "he [Keirrison] checked his bank account and the money was not there yet", thus deciding not to play. He was released after the 2015 Campeonato Brasileiro Série A.

=== 2016 ===
On 18 January 2016, Keirrison flew to Thailand to sign for Buriram United, however both sides could not agree on a deal and the transfer deal fell through.

=== From Coritiba to Londrina (twice) ===
Keirrison scored eight goals in 24 starts for Londrina in 2016 before returning to Coritiba, via Arouca in Portugal, only to sign for Londrina on a 2-year contract in January 2018 to compete in the Campeonato Paranaense, Série B and Copa do Brasil.

On 3 February 2018 he got his first goal since returning with the equaliser in the Alviceleste's match with Cianorte in the Café Stadium that finished 1-1.

== Personal life ==
Keirrison was born in Dourados, Mato Grosso do Sul, the son of Operário (MS) footballer Adir Carneiro and Alzira Rosa de Souza. His name was chosen by his father as a tribute to rock musicians Jim Morrison from The Doors and Keith Richards from The Rolling Stones, and also an admiration for the letter K. Keirrison and his father bought a football club from Campo Grande, the capital of Mato Grosso do Sul in April 2008, and renamed it to Centro de Futebol Keirrison, shortened as CFK9.

Keirrison is married to Hevelin Buss, sister of former teammate and Brazilian international Henrique. In November 2015, their two-year-old son died after a respiratory failure.

Keirrison now resides in Palm Beach, Florida.

== Career statistics ==
As of 26 January 2017

Appearances and goals by club, season and competition
Club	Season	League			Cup (Note: Includes Copa do Brasil, Taça de Portugal, Coppa Italia.)		Continental		State League		Total	
Club	Season	Division	Apps	Goals	Apps	Goals	Apps	Goals	Apps	Goals	Apps	Goals
Coritiba	2006	Série B	–		–		–		6	3	6	3
Coritiba	2007	Série B	32	12	6	0	–		20	9	58	21
Coritiba	2008	Série A	31	21	3	2	–		24	18	58	41
Coritiba	Total		63	33	9	2	0	0	50	30	122	65
Palmeiras	2009	Série A	7	5	–		13	6	16	13	36	24
Benfica (loan)	2009–10	Primeira Liga	5	0	1	0	1	0	–		7	0
Fiorentina (loan)	2009–10	Serie A	10	2	1	0	1	0	–		12	2
Santos (loan)	2010	Série A	11	3	–		–		–		11	3
Santos (loan)	2011	Série A	2	1	–		4	0	14	6	20	7
Santos (loan)	Total		13	4	0	0	4	0	14	6	31	10
Cruzeiro (loan)	2011	Série A	8	1	–		–		–		8	1
Coritiba (loan)	2013	Série A	9	1	–		2	0	–		11	1
Coritiba	2014	Série A	16	3	2	1	–		7	1	25	5
Coritiba	2015	Série A	1	0	–		–		1	0	2	0
Coritiba	Total		17	3	2	1	0	0	8	1	27	5
Londrina	2016	Série B	27	7	1	0	–		3	0	31	7
Career total			159	56	14	3	21	6	91	50	285	115

== Honours ==
Coritiba

- Campeonato Brasileiro Série B: 2007
- Campeonato Paranaense: 2008

Benfica

- Primeira Liga: 2009–10

Santos

- Campeonato Paulista: 2011
- Copa Libertadores: 2011

Individual

- Campeonato Brasileiro Série A top scorer: 2008 (21 goals)
- Campeonato Paranaense Best Striker: 2008
- Campeonato Paranaense Best Player: 2008
- Campeonato Paranaense Golden Shoe: 2008
- Trófeu Mesa Redonda: 2008
- 2008 – Chuteira de Ouro (Placar Magazine) – Campeonato Brasileiro 2008 top scorer
- 2008 – top scorer
- 2008 – Best Newcomer
- Arthur Friedenreich Award (for being Brazil's season top scorer): 2008 (41 goals)
