= Víctor Cortés =

Colombian footballer (born 1976)

Personal information
- Full name: Víctor Javier Cortés
- Date of birth: 26 February 1976 (age 50)
- Place of birth: Cali, Colombia
- Height: 1.68 m (5 ft 6 in)
- Positions: Striker; right winger

Youth career
- –1996: Envigado

Senior career*
Years	Team	Apps	(Gls)
1996–2005	Envigado		
2003	→ Deportivo Pereira (loan)		
2005–2006	Santa Fe		
2006–2007	Deportivo Pereira		
2007–2008	Cúcuta Deportivo		
2008–2010	América de Cali	54	(15)
2009	→ Deportivo Pereira (loan)	21	(1)
2010–2013	Junior	83	(20)
2013	Itagüí	27	(10)
2014	Envigado	16	(3)
2015	Uniautónoma	16	(2)
- * Club domestic league appearances and goals

Víctor Cortés is a retired Colombian footballer who played as a striker or right winger.

== Honours ==
América de Cali

- Categoría Primera A (1): 2008-II

Junior

- Categoría Primera A (2): 2010-I, 2011-II
