= Anthony Tapia =

Colombian footballer (born 1987)

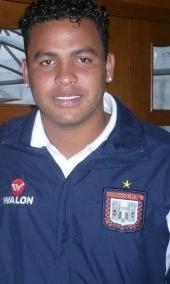

Personal information
- Full name: Anthony David Tapia Gil
- Date of birth: 16 January 1987 (age 39)
- Place of birth: Barranquilla, Colombia
- Height: 1.77 m (5 ft 10 in)
- Position: Midfielder

Team information
- Current team: Deportivo Pasto

Senior career*
| Years | Team | Apps | (Gls) |
| 2003–2004 | Deportivo Cali | | |
| 2005 | Atlético Huila | | |
| 2006 | Deportivo Cali | | |
| 2006–2007 | Santa Fe | | |
| 2008 | Deportivo Cali | 2 | (0) |
| 2009–2010 | Boyacá Chicó | 63 | (23) |
| 2011 | Deportivo Cali | 8 | (1) |
| 2012 | Once Caldas | 13 | (2) |
| 2013– | Deportivo Pasto | 1 | (1) |
- * Club domestic league appearances and goals as of January 3, 2013

Anthony David Tapia Gil (born 16 January 1987) is a Colombian footballer who plays for Deportivo Pasto. He can play as creative midfielder.

He was a starter on the Colombian Sub 20 that played in the Central American Games in 2006 where Colombia won the gold medal. He was surprisingly cut from the team that went on to play the Sudamericana to qualify for the 2007 Sub 20 WC was eliminated in the 2nd round.
