= Jaime Córdoba (footballer) =

Colombian footballer (born 1988)

Personal information
- Full name: Jaime Miguel Córdoba Taborda
- Date of birth: 7 May 1988 (age 38)
- Place of birth: Cali, Colombia
- Height: 1.82 m (6 ft 0 in)
- Position: Midfielder

Team information
- Current team: Cortulua

Youth career
- América de Cali

Senior career*
| Years | Team | Apps | (Gls) |
| 2006–2008 | América de Cali | 17 | (0) |
| 2009 | Junior | 6 | (0) |
| 2009–2010 | América de Cali | 14 | (1) |
| 2010 | Atlético Nacional | 8 | (0) |
| 2011 | América de Cali | 12 | (0) |
- * Club domestic league appearances and goals as of Feb 23 2012 (UTC)

Jaime Miguel Córdoba Taborda (born 7 May 1988) is a Colombian footballer who plays as a midfielder for Cortulua. He previously played for América de Cali, Junior Barranquilla and more recently Atlético Nacional.

Córdoba came to fame after winning a starting spot on America de Cali at age 20 and helped the team win its 13th league title. His performances lead for FIFA to name him one of the best young players for 2009.
