= Derlis Paredes =

Paraguayan footballer (born 1985)

Personal information
- Full name: Derlis Miguel Paredes Ortiz
- Date of birth: 4 July 1985 (age 41)
- Place of birth: Minga Guazú, Paraguay
- Height: 1.78 m (5 ft 10 in)
- Position: Forward

Senior career*
Years	Team	Apps	(Gls)
2005–2007	Sol de América		
2008	Lota Schwager		
2008	Real Mamoré	9	(4)
2009	Aurora	21	(5)
2010	12 de Octubre	0	(0)
2010	Enrique Happ		
2011	La Paz FC	7	(0)
2011–2015	Deportivo Quevedo	41	(17)
2012	→ River Plate Asunción (loan)		
2016	Deportivo Caaguazú		
2017	Ovetense		
2017	2 de Mayo		
2018	Sportivo Iteño		
- * Club domestic league appearances and goals

Derlis Miguel Paredes Ortiz (born 4 July 1985) is a Paraguayan former footballer who played as a forward.

== Career ==
Besides Paraguay, Paredes played in Chile and Bolivia for Lota Schwager, Real Mamoré, Aurora, Enrique Happ and La Paz FC.

In his homeland, Paredes played for clubs such as Sol de América, Deportivo Caaguazú, Ovetense, 2 de Mayo, among others.
