= Andrés Felipe Ortiz =

Colombian footballer (born 1987)

Personal information
- Date of birth: March 20, 1987 (age 39)
- Place of birth: Medellín, Colombia
- Height: 1.84 m (6 ft 0 in)
- Position: Defender

Team information
- Current team: Independiente Medellín
- Number: 3

Senior career*
Years	Team	Apps	(Gls)
2006–????	Independiente Medellín	72	(1)

International career
2007	Colombia U-20	2	(0)
- * Club domestic league appearances and goals as of 21:36, 20 February 2010 (UTC)

Andrés Felipe Ortiz (born March 20, 1987) is a Colombian footballer that plays for Independiente Medellín.

He can play as central defender. He was a starter on the Colombia U-20 team that failed to qualify for the 2007 World Cup.
