= Leonardo Gaciba =

Brazilian football referee

Leonardo Gaciba da Silva (born June 26, 1971, in Pelotas, Rio Grande do Sul), is a former Brazilian association football referee.

Gaciba refereed his first match in 1993 between Guarany Futebol Clube and Grêmio Atlético Farroupilha. In 2005, Gaciba entered into FIFA's squad. He has refereed many CONMEBOL's tournaments and represented Brazil in the Copa Libertadores 2008. He announced his retirement in October 2010.

== Career ==
Born in Pelotas, Rio Grande do Sul, he has a degree in physical education and, in parallel with his profession as a referee, he manages a gym in Porto Alegre. The first professional match he refereed was against Grêmio Atlético Farroupilha, from Pelotas, and Guarany Futebol Clube, from Bagé, in 1993. At the age of 25, he refereed his first Gre-Nal classic.

In 2005 he joined FIFA. In 2008, he received the CBF award as best referee of the Brazilian Championship, an award he won for the fourth time, the third in a row (2005, 2006, 2007 and 2009).

In 2009, he was removed from FIFA after failing the entity's physical tests and lost the chance to referee the 2010 World Cup in South Africa.

In October 2010 he left his refereeing career and became a refereeing commentator for Rádio Gaúcha and RBS TV.

On September 21, 2011, he made his first appearance as a referee commentator for Rede Globo de Televisão, commentating on the match between Atlético-MG and Flamengo on matchday 25 of the Brazilian Championship. On May 21, 2019, he made his first appearance as a referee commentator on Troca de Passes, a program on the Brazilian sports channel SporTV. On April 8, 2019, he was announced as head of refereeing of the CBF during the management of Rogério Caboclo, a position he held until November 12, 2021, after several refereeing controversies in the Brazilian Championship.

In June 2022, he signed a contract to work as a commentator for the Disney.
