= Rodrigo Teixeira =

Brazilian footballer

Personal information
- Full name: Rodrigo Teixeira Pereira
- Date of birth: June 16, 1978 (age 48)
- Place of birth: Barra Mansa, Brazil
- Height: 1.87 m (6 ft 2 in)
- Position: Striker

Senior career*
Years	Team	Apps	(Gls)
	Vasco da Gama	?	(?)
	São Cristóvão	?	(?)
2001–2002	Ceahlăul Piatra Neamţ	?	(?)
2002	Esmeraldas Petrolero	28	(?)
2003–2004	Barcelona SC	79	(?)
2005	Atlético Junior	13	(4)
2005	Caracas	?	(?)
2006	Cúcuta Deportivo	5	(1)
2007	Wehen Wiesbaden	0	(0)
2007–2008	Aboomoslem	16	(3)
2009	Deportivo Cuenca	16	(9)
2010	Guaraní	39	(19)
2011	Barcelona SC	15	(2)
2011–2012	Nacional Asunción	54	(20)
2013	Guaraní	39	(12)
2014–2015	Sportivo Luqueño	37	(9)
2015	Deportivo Santaní	20	(6)
2015–2016	Nacional Asunción	25	(3)
2016–2018	Sportivo Trinidense	28	(7)
2018	River Plate Asunción	?	(?)
- * Club domestic league appearances and goals

Rodrigo Teixeira Pereira (born 16 June 1978) is a Brazilian former professional footballer who played as a striker.

== Career ==
=== Guaraní (2010) ===
In January 2010, Texeira signed with Guaraní for the entire season, joining players Jonathan Fabbro, Federico Santander, Elvis Marecos and Joel Silva. In February 2010, Texeira scored in a 3-1 victory against Club Sol de América.

=== Guaraní (2013) ===
In January 2013, ABC Color announced that Texeira was close to returning to Guaraní, when he attended a reunion with the club's president at the same time that Guaraní would also sign Julio César Caceres. It was then confirmed that Texeira officially signed with Guaraní, as a new member of the squad for the 2013 Primera División Paraguaya season and the Copa Sudamericana. In April, Texeira was hailed a hero for coming on as a substitute and scoring a double in a victory for Guaraní.

=== Sportivo Luqueño (2014–2015) ===
In January 2014, Texeira was presented as a Sportivo Luqueño player, signing for the 2014 season. Texeira joined the club amidst rumours of possible interest from Olimpia Asunción, however, Texeira joined Luqueño as replacement for the Uruguayan Hernan Rodrigo Lopez who departed Luqueño to join Libertad.

=== Deportivo Santaní (2015) ===
In January 2015, Teixeira joined newly promoted side Deportivo Santani, his fourth Paraguayan club. He was one of six signings presented by the club for the 2015 season. In February 2015, Teixeira scored in a 2–0 victory against Sportivo San Lorenzo in the first week of the season.

== Personal life ==
In May 2010, Texeira suffered a transit accident in Asunción following a training session with Guaraní. He received various knocks, as well as his passengers, his Guaraní teammates. In July 2013, Texeira married Jacqueline Madelaire Gubetich at the Asunción Catedral Metropolitana.
