= Jorge Núñez (footballer, born 1984) =

Paraguayan footballer

Personal information
- Full name: Jorge Daniel Núñez
- Date of birth: 22 July 1984 (age 42)
- Place of birth: Ñemby, Paraguay
- Height: 1.72 m (5 ft 7 1/2 in)
- Position: Midfielder

Team information
- Current team: Once Caldas

Senior career*
Years	Team	Apps	(Gls)
2004	Club Sport Colombia	5	(1)
2004–2007	Sportivo Luqueño	41	(19)
2007	Vélez Sarsfield	8	(0)
2008	Guaraní	12	(0)
2008–2009	Nacional	21	(10)
2009–2011	Cerro Porteño	65	(14)
2011–2012	Once Caldas	33	(7)
2012	Club Olimpia	14	(0)
2013	Once Caldas	17	(0)

International career
2012	Paraguay	1	(0)
- * Club domestic league appearances and goals as of 23 September 2013

Jorge Daniel Núñez (born 22 September 1984) is a former Paraguayan football midfielder who played for last time Atlético Huracán Las Heras.

== Career ==
Núñez began his playing career in 2004 with Sport Colombia; he has also played for Sportivo Luqueño, Guaraní, Nacional and Cerro Porteño in Paraguay. He also played for Vélez Sársfield in Argentina.
