= List of Argentine Primera División transfers (2007–08 season) =

This is a list of football transfers involving teams from the Argentine Primera División for the 2007–08 season.

== June–August window ==
=== Argentinos Juniors ===
In

- (Argentina) Roberto Battión from (Argentina) Unión
- (Argentina) Martín Cabrera from (Argentina) Olimpo
- (Argentina) Alejandro Delorte from (Italy) Brescia
- (Argentina) Sergio Escudero from (Argentina) Independiente
- (Argentina) Leandro Fleitas from (Argentina) Olimpo (loan return)
- (Argentina) Juan Ignacio Mercier from (Argentina) Platense
- (Argentina) Diego Morales from (Argentina) All Boys (loan return)
- (Argentina) Gabriel Peñalba from (Italy) Cagliari
- (Uruguay) Álvaro Pereira from (Argentina) Quilmes
- (Argentina) Andrés Romero from (Argentina) Ben Hur
- (Argentina) Juan Sabia from (Argentina) Gimnasia de Jujuy
- (Argentina) Roberto Nicolás Saucedo from (Mexico) C.F. Ciudad Juárez

Out

- (Argentina) Juan Pablo Avendaño to (Turkey) Kayserispor
- (Argentina) Facundo Bonvín to (Argentina) Platense
- (Argentina) Sebastián Brunet to (Argentina) Ferro (loan)
- (Argentina) Gabriel Bustos to (Argentina) Aldosivi
- (Argentina) Fernando Cáceres (retired)
- (Argentina) Sebastián Carrera to (Argentina) Arsenal
- (Argentina) Lucio Ceresetto to (Argentina) Ben Hur
- (Uruguay) Gonzalo Choy to (Mexico) Morelia
- (Argentina) Matías Córdoba to (Argentina) Tigre (loan)
- (Argentina) Pablo De Muner to (Spain) Polideportivo Ejido
- (Argentina) Leandro Desábato to (Argentina) Estudiantes LP (end of loan)
- (Argentina) Leandro Martínez to (Argentina) All Boys
- (Argentina) Leonel Núñez to (Greece) Olympiacos F.C.
- (Argentina) Facundo Pérez Castro to (Argentina) Gimnasia de Jujuy
- (Argentina) Marcelo Pontiroli to (Argentina) Quilmes
- (Argentina) Marcelo Sarmiento to (Greece) AEL

=== Arsenal de Sarandí ===
In

- (Argentina) Martín Andrizzi from (Argentina) Banfield
- (Argentina) Leonardo Biagini from (Spain) Albacete
- (Paraguay) Ariel Bogado from (Paraguay) Nacional de Asunción
- (Argentina) Mariano Brau from (Mexico) Tecos UAG B (loan return)
- (Argentina) José Luis Calderón from (Argentina) Estudiantes LP
- (Argentina) Sebastián Carrera from (Argentina) Argentinos Juniors
- (Argentina) Alexander Corro from (Argentina) Atlanta
- (Argentina) Israel Damonte from (Argentina) Nueva Chicago
- (Argentina) Christian Díaz from (Argentina) Huracán
- (Argentina) Aníbal Matellán from (Spain) Gimnàstic
- (Colombia) Josimar Mosquera from (Argentina) Estudiantes LP
- (Argentina) Leonardo Ulloa from (Argentina) San Lorenzo (loan)
- (Argentina) Diego Villar from (Argentina) Godoy Cruz
- (Argentina) Andrés Yllana from (Argentina) Belgrano

Out

- (Argentina) Cristian Castillo to (Argentina) Atlanta
- (Argentina) Esteban Dreer to (Lithuania) FBK Kaunas
- (Argentina) Luis Pedro Figueroa to (Argentina) Banfield
- (United States) Bryan Gerzycich to (Israel) Hapoel Haifa
- (Argentina) Cristian Llama to (Italy) Catania
- (Argentina) Gabriel Loeschbor to (Argentina) Gimnasia de Jujuy
- (Argentina) Javier Lux to (Argentina) Belgrano
- (Argentina) Pablo Mouche to (Argentina) Boca Juniors (end of loan)
- (Argentina) Mauro Óbolo to (Sweden) AIK
- (Argentina) Jorge Alberto Ortiz to (Argentina) San Lorenzo (end of loan)
- (Colombia) Andrés Pérez to (Colombia) Millonarios (end of loan)
- (Uganda) Ibrahim Sekagya to (Austria) Red Bull Salzburg
- (Argentina) Lucas Valdemarín to (Sweden) AIK

=== Banfield ===
In

- (Argentina) Ariel Broggi from (Argentina) Vélez Sársfield
- (Argentina) Esteban Buján from (Argentina) Godoy Cruz (loan return)
- (Argentina) Nilo Carretero from (Argentina) Sarmiento de Junín
- (Paraguay) José Devaca from (Argentina) Godoy Cruz
- (Chile) Luis Pedro Figueroa from (Argentina) Arsenal
- (Argentina) Diego Herner from (Argentina) Gimnasia LP
- (Colombia) Jairo Patiño from (Colombia) Atlético Nacional
- (Argentina) Nicolás Pavlovich from (Mexico) Morelia

Out

- (Argentina) Martín Andrizzi to (Argentina) Arsenal
- (Argentina) Cristian Bardaro to (Uruguay) Danubio F.C.
- (Argentina) Sebastián Brown to (Argentina) Talleres
- (Argentina) José Chatruc to (Argentina) Racing
- (Argentina) Hernán Díaz to (Argentina) Tristán Suárez
- (Argentina) Guillermo Esteban to (Argentina) Belgrano
- (Argentina) Cristian Galeazzi to (Argentina) Almagro
- (Argentina) Carlos Galván to (Peru) Universitario
- (Argentina) Silvio González to (Cyprus) Olympiakos Nicosia
- (Uruguay) Josemir Lujambio to (Argentina) Olimpo
- (Argentina) Julián Maidana to (Argentina) Talleres
- (Argentina) Ángel Morales to (Argentina) Olimpo
- (Argentina) Hernán Pagés to (Argentina) Belgrano
- (Argentina) Roberto Salvatierra to (Argentina) Gimnasia LP
- (Argentina) Gastón Schmidt to (Argentina) Quilmes
- (Argentina) Federico Tenaglia to (Argentina) Juventud de Pergamino

=== Boca Juniors ===
In

- (Uruguay) Carlos Bueno from (Portugal) Sporting CP
- (Uruguay) Álvaro González from (Uruguay) Defensor Sporting (loan)
- (Argentina) Leandro Gracián from (Mexico) CF Monterrey
- (Argentina) Pablo Mouche from (Argentina) Arsenal (loan return)
- (Argentina) Gabriel Paletta from (England) Liverpool F.C.
- (Colombia) Fabián Vargas from (Brazil) SC Internacional (loan return)

Out

- (Paraguay) Aldo Bobadilla to (Colombia) Independiente Medellín
- (Argentina) Daniel Díaz to (Spain) Getafe CF
- (Argentina) Leandro Díaz & Andrés Franzoia to (Argentina) Huracán (loan)
- (Argentina) Guillermo Marino to (Mexico) UANL Tigres (loan)
- (Argentina) Bruno Marioni to (Mexico) Club Atlas
- (Uruguay) Sergio Orteman to (Turkey) Istanbul B.B. (loan)
- (Argentina) Juan Román Riquelme to (Spain) Villarreal CF (end of loan)
- (Argentina) Clemente Rodríguez to (Spain) RCD Espanyol (end of loan from Spartak Moscow)
- (Argentina) Santiago Villafañe & Juan Forlín to (Spain) Real Madrid Castilla (loan)

=== Colón de Santa Fe ===
In

- (Argentina) Alejandro Capurro from (Turkey) Sakaryaspor (loan return)
- (Argentina) Martín Cardetti from (Colombia) Deportivo Cali
- (Argentina) Darío Gandín from (Argentina) Gimnasia de Jujuy (loan return)
- (Argentina) Ariel Garcé from (Argentina) Rosario Central
- (Venezuela) César González from (Venezuela) Caracas FC
- (Colombia) Jhonnier González from (Colombia) Independiente Santa Fe
- (Argentina) Sebastián Prediguer from (Colombia) Millonarios (loan return)
- (Chile) Luis Ignacio Quinteros from (Mexico) León
- (Argentina) Sebastián Romero from (Argentina) Racing

Out

- (Argentina) Fernando Alloco, Martín Bravo & Sebastián Malandra to (Argentina) San Martín de San Juan (loan)
- (Argentina) Diego Barrado to (Argentina) Olimpo (end of loan from River Plate)
- (Ecuador) Jorge Guagua to (Ecuador) Emelec
- (Argentina) Guillermo Imhoff to (Austria) FC Wacker Innsbruck
- (Argentina) Gastón Esmerado to (Spain) UD Vecindario
- (Argentina) José Sand to (Argentina) Lanús

=== Estudiantes de La Plata ===
In

- (Argentina) Julio Barroso from (Spain) Lorca
- (Argentina) José Basanta from (Argentina) Olimpo (loan return)
- (Argentina) Jeremías Caggiano from (France) EA Guingamp
- (Argentina) Leandro Desábato from (Argentina) Argentinos Juniors (loan return)
- (Argentina) Diego Galván from (Argentina) River Plate
- (Paraguay) Édgar González from (Paraguay) Cerro Porteño
- (Spain) Iván Moreno y Fabianesi from (Argentina) Vélez Sársfield
- (Argentina) Enzo Pérez from (Argentina) Godoy Cruz
- (Uruguay) Juan Manuel Salgueiro from (Mexico) Necaxa
- (Argentina) César Taborda from (Argentina) Defensa y Justicia (loan return)
- (Argentina) Lucas Wílchez from (Argentina) Tigre (loan return)

Out

- (Argentina) Ezequiel Brítez to (Argentina) Nueva Chicago (loan)
- (Argentina) José Luis Calderón & (Colombia) Josimar Mosquera to (Argentina) Arsenal
- (Colombia) Mauricio Casierra to (Colombia) Once Caldas
- (Argentina) Hugo Colace to (Brazil) Flamengo
- (Argentina) Lucio Micheli to (Argentina) Temperley
- (Argentina) Diego Noguera to (Argentina) Defensa y Justicia
- (Argentina) Mariano Pavone to (Spain) Real Betis
- (Argentina) José Sosa to (Germany) FC Bayern Munich
- (Uruguay) Sebastián Vázquez to (Ukraine) FC Chornomorets Odesa
- (Argentina) Bruno Bianchi (released)

=== Gimnasia y Esgrima de Jujuy ===
In

- (Argentina) Juan Jose Arraya from (Argentina) Juventud Antoniana (loan return)
- (Argentina) César Carranza from (Argentina) Nueva Chicago
- (Argentina) Matías Miramontes & Maximiliano Cavalotti from (Argentina) Newell's Old Boys
- (Argentina) Héctor Desvaux & Nereo Fernández from (Argentina) Unión (loan)
- (Argentina) Ezequiel Garré from (Greece) Ilisiakos F.C.
- (Argentina) Emanuel Giménez from (Argentina) Talleres
- (Argentina) Darío González from (Argentina) Instituto
- (Argentina) Juan Manuel Herbella & Osvaldo Miranda from (Argentina) Godoy Cruz
- (Argentina) Gabriel Loeschbor from (Argentina) Arsenal
- (Argentina) Jorge Luna from (Argentina) Deportivo Armenio (loan)
- (Argentina) Diego Mateo from (Spain) Hércules CF
- (Argentina) Facundo Pérez Castro from (Argentina) Argentinos Juniors
- (Argentina) Gabriel Ruiz from (Argentina) Unión
- (Argentina) Eric Schmil from (Argentina) Juventud Antoniana

Out

- (Argentina) Cristian Basualdo to (Argentina) Talleres
- (Argentina) José Luis Campi to (Argentina) Talleres de Perico
- (Argentina) Pablo Frontini to (Argentina) San Martín de San Juan
- (Argentina) Darío Gandín to (Argentina) Colón (end of loan)
- (Argentina) Javier García to (Argentina) Chacarita Juniors
- (Argentina) Gabriel Iribarren to (Belgium) Dender
- (Argentina) Luis Medero to (Argentina) Almagro
- (Argentina) Germán Noce to (Argentina) San Martín de Tucumán
- (Argentina) Juan Sabia to (Argentina) Argentinos Juniors
- (Argentina) Fernando Soler to (Argentina) Platense

=== Gimnasia y Esgrima La Plata ===
In

- (Argentina) Pablo Batalla from (Argentina) Quilmes
- (Argentina) Sebastián Cejas from (Chile) Colo-Colo
- (Argentina) Renato Civelli from (France) Olympique de Marseille
- (Argentina) Federico Domínguez from (Argentina) River Plate
- (Argentina) Elvio Friedrich from (Argentina) Almagro (loan return)
- (Argentina) Germán Herrera from (Spain) Real Sociedad (loan from San Lorenzo)
- (Argentina) Nicolás Medina from (Argentina) Talleres
- (Argentina) Roberto Salvatierra from (Argentina) Banfield

Out

- (Argentina) Pablo Bangardino to (Uruguay) Central Español (loan)
- (Argentina) Germán Basualdo to (Argentina) Almirante Brown
- (Argentina) Oscar Roberto Cornejo to (Colombia) Deportivo Cali
- (Argentina) Agustín Domenez to (Argentina) Almagro (loan)
- (Argentina) Sebastián Dubarbier to (Argentina) Olimpo
- (Argentina) Juan Figueroa to (Colombia) Bucaramanga
- (Argentina) Ariel Franco to (Argentina) San Martín de San Juan
- (Argentina) Diego Herner to (Argentina) Banfield
- (Argentina) Juan Carlos Olave to (Argentina) Belgrano
- (Uruguay) Antonio Pacheco to (Uruguay) Peñarol
- (Argentina) Gustavo Semino to (Argentina) Atlético Rafaela
- (Uruguay) Santiago Silva to (Argentina) Vélez Sársfield
- (Argentina) Sergio Valenti to (Uruguay) Defensor Sporting

=== Huracán ===
In

- (Argentina) Marcelo Barovero & (Argentina) Walter Gómez from (Argentina) Atlético Rafaela
- (Argentina) Alexis Castro from (United Arab Emirates) Al-Ahli
- (Argentina) Andrés Franzoia & (Argentina) Leandro Díaz from (Argentina) Boca Juniors (loan)
- (Uruguay) Sebastián Díaz from (Uruguay) Central Español
- (Argentina) Franco Mendoza from (Mexico) Atlante F.C.
- (Argentina) Federico Nieto from (Italy) Verona
- (Uruguay) Juan Manuel Ortiz from (Uruguay) Peñarol
- (Argentina) Ángel Puertas from (Argentina) Platense
- (Argentina) Leonardo Romero from (Argentina) Acassuso
- (Argentina) Alan Sánchez from (Chile) O'Higgins
- (Argentina) Patricio Toranzo from (Argentina) Atlético Rafaela (loan from River Plate)
- (Argentina) Luciano Varaldo from (Argentina) Central Córdoba (SdE)
- (Argentina) Omar Zarif from (Argentina) Nueva Chicago
- (Argentina) Antonio Barijho (free agent)

Out

- (Argentina) Manuel Baigorria to (Ecuador) Olmedo
- (Argentina) Christian Díaz to (Argentina) Arsenal
- (Argentina) Elías Gómez to (Argentina) Tristán Suárez
- (Argentina) Joaquín Larrivey to (Italy) Cagliari
- (Argentina) Héctor Larroque to (Argentina) Sportivo Italiano
- (Argentina) Mauro Milano to (Greece) Asteras Tripolis
- (Argentina) Lucas Nardi to (Argentina) Aldosivi
- (Argentina) Gerardo Solana to (Argentina) Godoy Cruz
- (Argentina) Juan Manuel Sosa to (Argentina) Ferro
- (Argentina) Hernán Vigna to (Argentina) Platense
- (Argentina) Leonardo Díaz, (Argentina) Rodolfo Quinteros & (Paraguay) Héctor Núñez (released)

=== Independiente ===
In

- (Argentina) Sebastián Carrizo from (Spain) UD Vecindario (loan return)
- (Paraguay) Cristian Ledesma from (Paraguay) Olimpia
- (Argentina) Lucas Mareque from (Portugal) FC Porto
- (Argentina) Ricardo Moreira from (Argentina) Rosario Central
- (Argentina) Matías Oyola from (Argentina) Belgrano

Out

- (Argentina) David Abraham to (Spain) Gimnàstic (loan)
- (Argentina) Emiliano Armenteros to (Spain) Sevilla Atlético (loan)
- (Argentina) Juan Eluchans to (France) SM Caen
- (Argentina) Sergio Escudero to (Argentina) Argentinos Juniors
- (Argentina) Sebastián Godoy to (Argentina) Talleres RE
- (Argentina) Federico González to (Argentina) Ferro (loan)
- (Argentina) Matías Manrique to (Uruguay) Peñarol
- (Argentina) Lucas Ojeda to (Argentina) San Martín de Tucumán
- (Argentina) Carlos Sciucatti to (Colombia) Academia F.C.
- (Colombia) David Solari to (Italy) Chioggia
- (Argentina) Oscar Ustari to (Spain) Getafe CF

=== Lanús ===
In

- (Peru) Roberto Jiménez from (Argentina) San Lorenzo (loan)
- (Argentina) Adrián Peralta from (Argentina) Newell's Old Boys
- (Argentina) José Sand from (Argentina) Colón
- (Argentina) Leonardo Sigali from (Argentina) Nueva Chicago
- (Brazil) Jadson Viera from (Uruguay) Danubio F.C.

Out

- (Argentina) Javier Almirón to (Spain) Polideportivo Ejido
- (Argentina) Rodrigo Archubi to (Greece) Olympiacos F.C.
- (Argentina) Cristian Fabbiani to (Romania) CFR Cluj
- (Argentina) Sebastián Leto to (England) Liverpool F.C.
- (Argentina) Mauricio Romero to (Mexico) Morelia
- (Argentina) Néstor Moiraghi (released)

=== Newell's Old Boys ===
In

- (Argentina) Pablo Aguilar from (Argentina) Chacarita Juniors (loan)
- (Paraguay) Diego Barreto & (Paraguay) Alejandro Da Silva from (Paraguay) Cerro Porteño
- (Argentina) Matías Donnet from (Argentina) Belgrano
- (Argentina) Marcos Gutiérrez from (Argentina) Olimpo
- (Uruguay) Yony Peralta from (Uruguay) Durazno FC
- (Argentina) Juan Leandro Quiroga from (Mexico) Puebla F.C.
- (Paraguay) Santiago Salcedo from (Mexico) Chiapas
- (Argentina) Rolando Schiavi from (Brazil) Grêmio
- (Argentina) Diego Torres from (Argentina) Quilmes
- (Argentina) Pablo Vázquez from (Argentina) Villa Mitre
- (Argentina) Juan Manuel Sosa from (Argentina) Ferro

Out

- (Argentina) Gastón Aguirre & (Argentina) Lautaro Formica to (Argentina) San Lorenzo
- (Argentina) Carlos Araujo to (Argentina) Olimpo
- (Argentina) Sebastián Arrieta to (Argentina) Racing
- (Paraguay) Óscar Cardozo to (Portugal) S.L. Benfica
- (Argentina) Maximiliano Cavalotti & (Argentina) Matías Miramontes to (Argentina) Gimnasia de Jujuy
- (Argentina) Mauro Cejas to (Mexico) Tecos UAG
- (Colombia) Mauricio Chalar to (Colombia) Bucaramanga
- (Argentina) Marcos Flores to (Argentina) Unión
- (Argentina) Nahuel Guzmán to (Argentina) Independiente Rivadavia (loan)
- (Argentina) Adrián Peralta to (Argentina) Lanús
- (Argentina) Germán Rivera to (Argentina) Talleres
- (Argentina) Mario Sosa to (Argentina) Alvarado

=== Olimpo de Bahía Blanca ===
In

- (Argentina) Carlos Araujo from (Argentina) Newell's Old Boys
- (Argentina) Diego Barrado from (Argentina) Colón (loan from River Plate)
- (Paraguay) Salustiano Candia & (Argentina) Gustavo Pinto from (Argentina) Godoy Cruz
- (Argentina) Juan Carlos Carrizo from (Netherlands) PSV Eindhoven
- (Argentina) Sebastián Dubarbier from (Argentina) Gimnasia LP
- (Chile) Sebastián González from (Mexico) Veracruz
- (Uruguay) Josemir Lujambio & (Argentina) Ángel Morales from (Argentina) Banfield
- (Argentina) Jorge Daniel Martínez & (Colombia) Carlos Navarro Montoya from (Argentina) Nueva Chicago
- (Argentina) Mariano Martínez from (Argentina) Almagro
- (Argentina) Javier Páez from (Israel) Hapoel Tel Aviv F.C.
- (Argentina) Raúl Saavedra from (Argentina) Quilmes
- (Paraguay) Jorge Torales from (Ecuador) Olmedo
- (Argentina) José Ramírez from (Argentina) San Lorenzo

Out

- (Argentina) Martín Asencio to (Argentina) Los Andes
- (Argentina) José Basanta to (Argentina) Estudiantes LP (end of loan)
- (Argentina) Ismael Blanco to (Greece) AEK Athens
- (Argentina) Diego Caballero to (Argentina) Independiente Rivadavia
- (Argentina) Martín Cabrera to (Argentina) Argentinos Juniors
- (Argentina) Silvio Carrario to (Argentina) Aldosivi
- (Argentina) Leandro Fleitas to (Argentina) Argentinos Juniors (end of loan)
- (Argentina) Federico García to (Argentina) Belgrano
- (Argentina) Marcos Gutiérrez to (Argentina) Newell's Old Boys
- (Argentina) Mauro Laspada to (Argentina) Alvarado
- (Argentina) Walter Zunino to (Argentina) Atlético Rafaela

=== Racing ===
In

- (Argentina) Sebastián Arrieta from (Argentina) Newell's Old Boys
- (Paraguay) Erwin Ávalos from (Mexico) Toluca
- (Argentina) Darío Bottinelli from (Argentina) San Lorenzo (loan)
- (Argentina) Hilario Navarro, (Paraguay) Marcos Cáceres & (Paraguay) Domingo Salcedo from (Paraguay) Cerro Porteño
- (Argentina) José Chatruc from (Argentina) Banfield
- (Argentina) Maximiliano Estévez from (Chile) Antofagasta
- (Chile) Reinaldo Navia from (Mexico) Club Atlas
- (Argentina) José Shaffer from (Sweden) IFK Göteborg (loan return)

Out

- (Argentina) Gonzalo Bergessio to (Portugal) S.L. Benfica
- (Argentina) Diego Crosa to (Israel) Maccabi Haifa F.C.
- (Argentina) Fernando de la Fuente to (Argentina) San Martín de San Juan
- (Paraguay) Celso Esquivel to (Argentina) San Lorenzo (end of loan)
- (Argentina) Pablo González to (Switzerland) FC Locarno (loan)
- (Argentina) Ezequiel Miralles to (Argentina) Talleres
- (Argentina) Maximiliano Moralez to (Russia) FC Moscow
- (Argentina) Sixto Peralta to (Argentina) River Plate
- (Argentina) Sebastián Romero to (Argentina) Colón
- (Argentina) Sergio Romero to (Netherlands) AZ Alkmaar
- (Argentina) Juan Manuel Torres to (Argentina) San Lorenzo
- (Argentina) Martín Vitali to (Argentina) Nueva Chicago
- (Argentina) Francisco Maciel (released)

=== River Plate ===
In

- (Argentina) Sixto Peralta from (Argentina) Racing
- (Argentina) Nicolás Sánchez & Mario Vega from (Argentina) Nueva Chicago
- (Chile) Alexis Sánchez from (Chile) Colo-Colo (loan from Udinese)
- (Argentina) Rolando Zárate from (Mexico) CF Monterrey

Out

- (Argentina) Federico Domínguez to (Argentina) Gimnasia LP
- (Argentina) Ernesto Farías to (Portugal) FC Porto
- (Argentina) Diego Galván to (Argentina) Estudiantes LP
- (Argentina) Germán Lux to (Spain) RCD Mallorca
- (Argentina) Fernando Pellegrino to (Italy) Cassino
- (Colombia) Nelson Rivas to (Italy) Inter Milan
- (Argentina) Rubens Sambueza to (Mexico) UNAM Pumas (loan)
- (Argentina) José San Román to (Argentina) Tigre (loan)
- (Argentina) Víctor Zapata to (Argentina) Vélez Sársfield
- (Argentina) Horacio Ameli (retired)

=== Rosario Central ===
In

- (Colombia) Martín Arzuaga from (Argentina) Godoy Cruz
- (Argentina) Eduardo Farías from (Argentina) Sportivo Las Parejas
- (Uruguay) Federico Martínez from (Uruguay) Central Español
- (Argentina) Mariano Messera from (Greece) Skoda Xanthi
- (Argentina) Emiliano Papa from (Argentina) Vélez Sársfield (loan)
- (Argentina) Enrique Seccafien from (Mexico) Tiburones Rojos de Coatzacoalcos
- (Argentina) José Vizcarra from (Ecuador) LDU Quito (loan return)
- (Venezuela) Oswaldo Vizcarrondo from (Venezuela) Caracas FC

Out

- (Paraguay) Roberto Acuña to (Paraguay) Olimpia
- (Argentina) Germán Alemanno to (Argentina) Quilmes
- (Argentina) Gonzalo De Porras to (Cyprus) Olympiakos Nicosia (loan)
- (Argentina) Ángel Di María & Andrés Díaz to (Portugal) S.L. Benfica
- (Argentina) Jorge Drovandi to (Australia) Newcastle Jets
- (Argentina) Ariel Garcé to (Argentina) Colón
- (Argentina) Ricardo Moreira to (Argentina) Independiente
- (Argentina) Maximiliano Re to (Italy) A.C. Siena
- (Argentina) Leonel Ríos to (Argentina) Vélez Sársfield
- (Colombia) Yovanny Arrechea (released)

=== San Lorenzo ===
In

- (Argentina) Gastón Aguirre from (Argentina) Newell's Old Boys
- (Argentina) Daniel Bilos from (Mexico) América (loan from AS Saint-Étienne)
- (Italy) Michael Díaz from (Argentina) San Telmo
- (Italy) Emiliano Díaz from (Argentina) Platense
- (Paraguay) Celso Esquivel from (Argentina) Racing (loan return)
- (Argentina) Lautaro Formica from (Argentina) Newell's Old Boys
- (Argentina) Juan Carlos Menseguez from (Germany) VfL Wolfsburg
- (Argentina) Walter Montillo from (Mexico) Morelia (loan return)
- (Argentina) Jerónimo Morales Neumann from (Ecuador) Emelec
- (Argentina) Jorge Alberto Ortiz from (Argentina) Arsenal (loan return)
- (Argentina) José Ramírez from (Greece) Ionikos F.C. (loan return)
- (Argentina) Bernardo Romeo from (Spain) CA Osasuna
- (Argentina) Juan Manuel Torres from (Argentina) Racing

Out

- (Argentina) Darío Bottinelli to (Argentina) Racing (loan)
- (Peru) Roberto Jiménez to (Argentina) Lanús (end of loan from Universitario)
- (Argentina) Ezequiel Lavezzi to (Italy) S.S.C. Napoli
- (Argentina) Cristian Ledesma to (Greece) Olympiacos F.C.
- (Argentina) Leonardo Ulloa to (Argentina) Arsenal (loan)
- (Argentina) José Ramírez to (Argentina) Olimpo (loan)

=== San Martín de San Juan ===
In

- (Argentina) Fernando Alloco, Martín Bravo & Sebastián Malandra from (Argentina) Colón (loan)
- (Argentina) Ariel Carreño from (Switzerland) FC Thun
- (Argentina) Fernando de la Fuente from (Argentina) Racing
- (Argentina) Ariel Franco from (Argentina) Gimnasia LP
- (Argentina) Pablo Frontini from (Argentina) Gimnasia de Jujuy
- (Argentina) Lucas Nanía from (Colombia) Deportivo Pereira
- (Argentina) Martín Ortiz from (Argentina) Defensa y Justicia
- (Argentina) Mariano Trípodi from (Germany) 1. FC Köln

Out

- (Argentina) Hernán Ferri to (Argentina) Gimnasia de Mendoza
- (Argentina) Lisandro Sacripanti to (Argentina) Independiente Rivadavia
- (Argentina) Marcos Bolzán (released)

=== Tigre ===
In

- (Argentina) Lucas Alessandria from (Spain) SD Ponferradina
- (Argentina) Leonel Altobelli from (Argentina) Barracas Bolívar
- (Argentina) Luis Ardente from (Argentina) San Telmo
- (Paraguay) Néstor Ayala from (Paraguay) Sportivo Luqueño
- (Argentina) Matías Córdoba from (Argentina) Argentinos Juniors (loan)
- (United States) DJ Countess from (Chile) Provincial Osorno
- (Argentina) Sebastián Ereros from (Argentina) Vélez Sársfield (loan)
- (Argentina) Norberto Paparatto from (Argentina) Tiro Federal
- (Argentina) Sebastián Rusculleda from (Argentina) Quilmes
- (Argentina) José San Román from (Argentina) River Plate (loan)
- (Argentina) Guillermo Suárez from (Argentina) Rivadavia de Lincoln

Out

- (Argentina) Patricio Abraham to (Argentina) Platense
- (Argentina) Alberto Alarcón to (Argentina) Defensores de Belgrano
- (Argentina) Sebastián Allende to (Argentina) All Boys
- (Argentina) Darío Capogrosso to (Argentina) Aldosivi
- (Argentina) Pablo Fontanello to (Chile) Santiago Wanderers (loan)
- (Argentina) Luciano Krikorián to (Argentina) San Martín de Tucumán
- (Argentina) Juan Pablo Pereyra to (Uruguay) Nacional
- (Argentina) Luis Salmerón to (Argentina) Ferro
- (Argentina) Aldo Visconti to (Argentina) Aldosivi
- (Argentina) Lucas Wílchez to (Argentina) Estudiantes LP (end of loan)
- (Argentina) Éver Zárate to (Argentina) Estudiantes BA
- (Argentina) Javier Mazzoni (released)

=== Vélez Sársfield ===
In

- (Uruguay) Pablo Lima from (Uruguay) Danubio FC
- (Argentina) Germán Montoya from (Argentina) Belgrano
- (Paraguay) Jorge Núñez from (Paraguay) Sportivo Luqueño
- (Argentina) Leonel Ríos from (Argentina) Rosario Central
- (Uruguay) Santiago Silva from (Argentina) Gimnasia LP
- (Argentina) Carlos Soto from (Argentina) Nueva Chicago
- (Argentina) Víctor Zapata from (Argentina) River Plate

Out

- (Argentina) Ariel Broggi to (Argentina) Banfield
- (Argentina) Lucas Castromán to (Mexico) América
- (Argentina) Sebastián Ereros to (Argentina) Tigre
- (Spain) Iván Moreno y Fabianesi to (Argentina) Estudiantes LP
- (Argentina) Emiliano Papa to (Argentina) Rosario Central (loan)
- (Argentina) Maximiliano Pellegrino to (Italy) Atalanta B.C. (loan)
- (Argentina) Lucas Quinteros (released)
- (Argentina) Javier Robles to (Chile) Santiago Wanderers (loan)
- (Argentina) Gastón Sessa to (Ecuador) Barcelona SC
- (Argentina) Marco Torsiglieri to (Argentina) Talleres (loan)
- (Argentina) Juan Manuel Varea to (Argentina) Deportivo Español
- (Argentina) Alejandro Verón to (Argentina) Almirante Brown
- (Argentina) Mauro Zárate to (Qatar) Al-Sadd

== January window ==
=== Argentinos Juniors ===
In

- (Argentina) Sebastián Brunet from (Argentina) Ferro (loan return)
- (Argentina) Ignacio Canuto from (Argentina) Unión de Santa Fe
- (Chile) Milovan Mirosevic from (Israel) Beitar Jerusalem F.C.
- (Argentina) Sebastián Torrico from (Argentina) Godoy Cruz
- (Argentina) Bruno Urribarri from (Argentina) Boca Juniors

Out

- (Argentina) Franco Niell to (United States) D.C. United (loan)
- (Argentina) Mauro Bogado to (Argentina) Instituto de Córdoba (loan)
- (Argentina) Nicolás Navarro to (Italy) S.S.C. Napoli
- (Argentina) Roberto Nicolás Saucedo to (Venezuela) UA Maracaibo
- (Argentina) Santiago Kuhl to (Switzerland) FC Locarno

=== Arsenal de Sarandí ===
In

- (Paraguay) Carlos Báez from (Argentina) Independiente (loan)
- (Argentina) Luciano Leguizamón from (Argentina) Gimnasia LP
- (Argentina) Cristian Pellerano from (Argentina) Racing

Out

- (Argentina) Israel Damonte to (Greece) Asteras Tripolis
- (Uruguay) Gastón Filgueira to (Uruguay) Nacional
- (Argentina) Santiago Raymonda to (Mexico) Veracruz
- (Argentina) Leonardo Ulloa to (Argentina) Olimpo (end of loan from San Lorenzo)
- (Argentina) Andrés Yllana to (Argentina) Nueva Chicago
- (Argentina) Franco Caraccio to (United States) Houston Dynamo
- (Paraguay) Ariel Bogado to (Paraguay) Nacional
- (Argentina) Diego Villar to (Argentina) Gimnasia LP

=== Banfield ===
In

- (Argentina) Andrés Díaz from (Portugal) S.L. Benfica (loan)
- (Uruguay) Martín Rodríguez from (Uruguay) River Plate Montevideo

Out

- (Argentina) Enrique Bologna to (Peru) Alianza Lima (loan)
- (Argentina) Esteban Buján to (Spain) Albacete Balompié
- (Chile) Luis Pedro Figueroa to (Chile) Cobreloa
- (Argentina) Cristian Maidana to (Russia) FC Spartak Moscow
- (Argentina) Alejandro Salinas to (Paraguay) Nacional
- (Argentina) Pablo Vitti to (Argentina) Independiente

=== Boca Juniors ===
In

- (Paraguay) Julio César Cáceres from (Mexico) UANL Tigres
- (Argentina) Lucas Castroman from (Mexico) América (loan)
- (Argentina) Juan Román Riquelme from (Spain) Villarreal CF

Out

- (Argentina) Éver Banega to (Spain) Valencia CF
- (Uruguay) Carlos Bueno to (Uruguay) Peñarol
- (Argentina) Matías Cahais to (Netherlands) FC Groningen
- (Argentina) Juan Krupoviesa to (France) Marseille (loan)
- (Argentina) Marcos Mondaini to (Ecuador) Barcelona SC
- (Argentina) Matías Silvestre to (Italy) Catania (loan)
- (Argentina) Mariano Torres & (Argentina) Matías Rodríguez to (Austria) LASK Linz (loan)
- (Argentina) Bruno Urribarri to (Argentina) Argentinos Juniors
- (Argentina) Nicolás Bertolo to (Uruguay) Nacional (loan)

=== Colón de Santa Fe ===
In

- (Paraguay) Pablo Aguilar from (Paraguay) Sportivo Luqueño
- (Argentina) César Carignano from (Switzerland) FC Basel
- (Argentina) Hernán Encina from (Mexico) Atlas
- (Argentina) Juan José Morales from (Argentina) San Martín de Tucumán
- (Argentina) Rodrigo Díaz from (Argentina) Independiente
- (Argentina) Esteban Fuertes from (Chile) Universidad Católica (loan return)

Out

- (Argentina) Emanuel Centurión to (Mexico) Atlas
- (Argentina) Esteban González to (Spain) UD Las Palmas
- (Colombia) Freddy Grisales to (Argentina) Independiente
- (Chile) Luis Ignacio Quinteros to (Argentina) Gimnasia LP
- (Argentina) Martín Troncoso & (Argentina) Emiliano Ciucci to (Argentina) Defensa y Justicia (loan)
- (Colombia) Jhonnier González to (Colombia) Independiente Santa Fe
- (Argentina) Omar Merlo to (Argentina) River Plate (loan)

=== Estudiantes de La Plata ===
In

- (Argentina) Ezequiel Brítez from (Argentina) Nueva Chicago (loan return)
- (Paraguay) Cristian Bogado from (Paraguay) Nacional
- (Uruguay) Juan Manuel Díaz from (Uruguay) Liverpool de Montevideo
- (Argentina) Leandro Lázzaro from (Argentina) Tigre
- (Argentina) Cristian Cellay from (Argentina) Huracán

Out

- (Argentina) Pablo Álvarez to (Italy) Catania
- (Argentina) Jeremías Caggiano to (Spain) Albacete
- (Argentina) Sebastián Domínguez to (Mexico) América

=== Gimnasia y Esgrima de La Plata ===
In

- (Argentina) Pablo Bangardino from (Uruguay) Central Español (loan return)
- (Argentina) Agustín Domenez from (Argentina) Almagro (loan return)
- (Uruguay) Diego Alonso from (China) Shanghai United F.C.
- (Chile) Luis Ignacio Quinteros from (Argentina) Colón de Santa Fe
- (Argentina) Diego Villar from (Argentina) Arsenal de Sarandí

Out

- (Argentina) Pablo Batalla to (Argentina) Quilmes
- (Argentina) Juan Cupertino to (Argentina) Sportivo Barracas
- (Argentina) Germán Herrera to (Brazil) Corinthians (end of loan from San Lorenzo)
- (Argentina) Luciano Leguizamón to (Argentina) Arsenal de Sarandí
- (Argentina) Sebastián Cejas (released)

=== Gimnasia y Esgrima de Jujuy ===
In

- (Paraguay) Federico Acuña from (Paraguay) Tacuary
- (Argentina) Luciano De Bruno from (Cyprus) AEL Limassol
- (Argentina) Gastón Montero from (Argentina) Vélez Sársfield (loan)
- (Paraguay) Diego Miranda from (Paraguay) 12 de Octubre
- (Argentina) Luis Miguel Escalada from (Brazil) Botafogo

Out

- (Argentina) Marcelo Berza to (Argentina) Belgrano de Córdoba
- (Argentina) Osvaldo Miranda to (Romania) Dinamo Bucharest
- (Argentina) Darío González, (Argentina) Emanuel Giménez & (Argentina) Ezequiel Garré (released)

=== Huracán ===
In

- (Argentina) Carlos Arano from (Spain) Polideportivo Ejido
- (Argentina) Eduardo Domínguez from (Colombia) Independiente Medellín
- (Argentina) Francisco Maciel (free agent)

Out

- (Argentina) Walter Gómez to (Argentina) Ferro
- (Uruguay) Juan Manuel Ortiz to (Uruguay) C.A. Cerro
- (Argentina) Leonardo Romero to (Argentina) Acassuso
- (Argentina) Cristian Cellay to (Argentina) Estudiantes de La Plata
- (Uruguay) Sebastián Díaz to (Uruguay) Defensor Sporting
- (Argentina) Luciano Varaldo to (Argentina) Almirante Brown
- (Argentina) Germán Zarza to (Argentina) Comunicaciones
- (Argentina) Claudio Ubeda and (Argentina) Raúl Gordillo (retired)

=== Independiente ===
In

- (Colombia) Freddy Grisales from (Argentina) Colón de Santa Fe
- (Argentina) Damian Ledesma from (Argentina) Rosario Central
- (Argentina) Pablo Vitti from (Argentina) Banfield

Out

- (Paraguay) Carlos Báez to (Argentina) Arsenal de Sarandí (loan)
- (Colombia) José Alcides Moreno to (Romania) Steaua București (loan)
- (Argentina) Rodrigo Díaz to (Argentina) Colón de Santa Fe
- (Argentina) Leandro Mussín to (Argentina) Luján

=== Lanús ===
In

- (Argentina) Iván Macalik from (Argentina) Ferro

Out

- (Argentina) Marcos Aguirre to (Spain) Real Valladolid
- (Peru) Roberto Jiménez to (Peru) Universitario (end of loan from San Lorenzo)
- (Argentina) Diego Manicero to (Argentina) Racing (loan)
- (Argentina) Walter Ribonetto to (Argentina) Rosario Central

=== Newell's Old Boys ===
In

- (Argentina) Nicolás Cabrera from (Argentina) Racing
- (Argentina) Juan Carlos Ferreyra from (Ecuador) Deportivo Cuenca
- (Argentina) Cristian Llama from (Italy) Catania (loan)
- (Uruguay) Diego Scotti from (Chile) Audax Italiano

Out

- (Argentina) Cristian Ansaldi to (Russia) Rubin Kazan
- (Paraguay) Diego Barreto to (Paraguay) Cerro Porteño (loan)
- (Uruguay) Yony Peralta to (Argentina) Tiro Federal
- (Argentina) José Luis Villagra to (Chile) O'Higgins
- (Argentina) Emanuel Lazzarini to (Argentina) Temperley

=== Olimpo ===
In

- (Uruguay) Ignacio Ithurralde from (Mexico) Monterrey
- (Argentina) Javier Robles from (Chile) Santiago Wanderers (loan from Vélez Sársfield)
- (Colombia) David Solari from (Italy) Chioggia
- (Argentina) Leonardo Ulloa from (Argentina) Arsenal de Sarandí (loan from San Lorenzo)

Out

- (Paraguay) Salustiano Candia to (Mexico) CD Veracruz
- (Argentina) Sebastián Dubarbier to (Romania) CFR Cluj
- (Chile) Sebastián González to (Mexico) Tecos UAG
- (Colombia) Carlos Navarro Montoya (released)
- (Colombia) David Solari to (Ecuador) Espoli

=== Racing Club ===
In

- (Argentina) Luis Benítez from (Chile) Santiago Wanderers (loan return)
- (Paraguay) Roberto Bonet from (Paraguay) Olimpia
- (Argentina) Diego Manicero from (Argentina) Lanús (loan)
- (Argentina) Maximiliano Moralez from (Russia) FC Moscow (loan)
- (Argentina) Bernardo Leyenda from (Argentina) River Plate

Out

- (Argentina) Gustavo Cabral to (Argentina) River Plate
- (Argentina) Nicolás Cabrera to Newell's Old Boys
- (Argentina) Darío Bottinelli to (Chile) Universidad Católica (end of loan from San Lorenzo)
- (Argentina) Claudio López to (United States) Kansas City Wizards
- (Argentina) Cristian Pellerano to (Argentina) Arsenal de Sarandí
- (Argentina) Martín Romagnoli to (Mexico) Toluca
- (Paraguay) Domingo Salcedo to (Chile) Colo-Colo

=== River Plate ===
In

- (Uruguay) Sebastián Abreu from (Mexico) UANL Tigres
- (Argentina) Rodrigo Archubi from (Greece) Olympiacos F.C.
- (Argentina) Gustavo Cabral from (Argentina) Racing
- (Argentina) Omar Merlo from (Argentina) Colón de Santa Fe (loan)

Out

- (Argentina) Fernando Belluschi to (Greece) Olympiacos F.C.
- (Argentina) René Lima to (Israel) Maccabi Haifa F.C. (loan)
- (Argentina) Gonzalo Ludueña to (Ecuador) Emelec
- (Argentina) Federico Lussenhoff to (Argentina) Talleres de Córdoba
- (Argentina) Sixto Peralta to (Romania) CFR Cluj
- (Argentina) Marco Rubén to (Spain) Recreativo Huelva
- (Colombia) Carlos Valencia to (France) Dijon FCO
- (Argentina) Rolando Zárate to (Ecuador) Barcelona SC
- (Argentina) Bernardo Leyenda to (Argentina) Racing

=== Rosario Central ===
In

- (Argentina) Ramiro Fassi from (Peru) Sporting Cristal
- (Uruguay) Maximiliano Pérez from (Uruguay) Fénix
- (Argentina) Jesús Méndez from (Switzerland) St. Gallen
- (Argentina) Walter Ribonetto from (Argentina) Lanús

Out

- (Argentina) Juan Manuel Azconzábal to (Spain) UD Las Palmas
- (Argentina) Juan Grabowski to (Bolivia) Oriente Petrolero (loan)
- (Argentina) Damián Ledesma to (Argentina) Independiente
- (Argentina) Enrique Seccafien to (Mexico) Tiburones Rojos de Veracruz
- (Venezuela) Oswaldo Vizcarrondo to (Venezuela) Caracas FC
- (Argentina) Claudio Velázquez to (Peru) José Gálvez

=== San Lorenzo ===
In

- (Argentina) Gonzalo Bergessio from (Portugal) S.L. Benfica
- (Argentina) Andrés D'Alessandro from (Spain) Real Zaragoza (loan)
- (Argentina) Diego Placente from (Spain) Celta de Vigo

Out

- (Argentina) Gastón Fernández to (Mexico) UANL Tigres
- (Argentina) Osmar Ferreyra to (Ukraine) Dnipro Dnipropetrovsk
- (Argentina) Walter Montillo to Universidad de Chile
- (Paraguay) Celso Esquivel to (Paraguay) Sportivo Luqueño
- (Argentina) Jerónimo Morales Neumann to (Argentina) Instituto
- (Argentina) Jorge Alberto Ortiz to (Sweden) AIK

=== San Martín de San Juan ===
In

- (Argentina) Daniel Giménez from (Chile) Cobreloa
- (Paraguay) Julio César Irrazábal from (Paraguay) Nacional
- (Argentina) Ezequiel Medrán from (Mexico) Lobos de la BUAP (loan from Boca Juniors)
- (Paraguay) Carlos Recalde from (Paraguay) Guaraní
- (Argentina) Pedro Galván from (Ecuador) Olmedo

Out

- (Argentina) Fernando Alloco to (Argentina) Defensa y Justicia (end of loan from Colón)
- (Argentina) Sebastián Malandra to (Argentina) Ben Hur
- (Argentina) Facundo Torres to (Argentina) Instituto de Córdoba
- (Argentina) Ariel Carreño to (Colombia) Millonarios
- (Argentina) Mariano Trípodi to (Brazil) Santos
- (Argentina) Gabriel Roth to (Colombia) Bucaramanga
- (Argentina) César Monasterio to (Argentina) Belgrano de Córdoba
- (Argentina) Maximiliano Kondratiuk (released)

=== Tigre ===
In

- (Paraguay) Miguel Angel Cuellar from (Paraguay) Sol de América
- (Argentina) Pablo Fontanello from (Chile) Santiago Wanderers (loan return)

Out

- (Argentina) Matías Córdoba to (United States) Real Salt Lake (end of loan from Argentinos Juniors)
- (Argentina) Alexis Ferrero to (Brazil) Botafogo
- (Argentina) Leandro Lázzaro to (Argentina) Estudiantes de La Plata
- (United States) DJ Countess (released)

=== Vélez Sársfield ===
In

- (Argentina) Patricio Pérez from (Chile) Everton de Viña del Mar (loan return)
- Waldo Ponce from Universidad de Chile
- (Argentina) Luciano Vella from (Spain) Cádiz CF (loan)

Out

- (Mexico) Mario Méndez to (Mexico) Toluca
- (Argentina) Gastón Montero to (Argentina) Gimnasia y Esgrima de Jujuy (loan)
- (Argentina) Franco Razzotti to (Peru) Sporting Cristal
- (Argentina) Ariel Rojas to (Argentina) Godoy Cruz (loan)
- (Argentina) Emmanuel Fernandes Francou to (Paraguay) Olimpia (loan)
- (Paraguay) Jorge Núñez to (Paraguay) Guaraní (loan)
