= Lucas Wilchez =

Argentine footballer

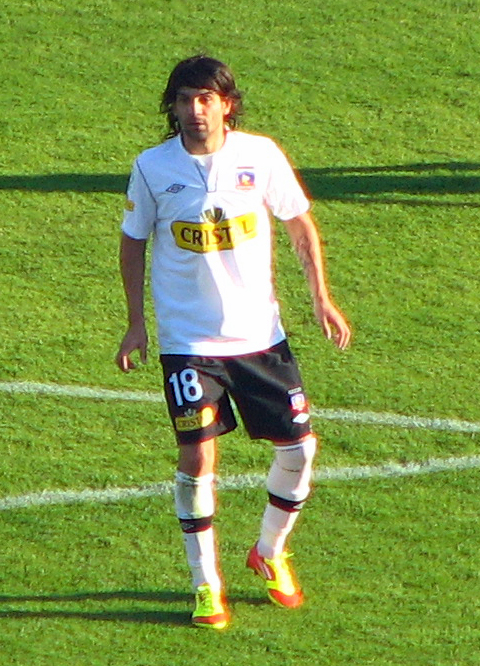
- Wilchez with Colo-Colo in 2012

Personal information
- Full name: Lucas Daniel Wilchez
- Date of birth: 31 August 1983 (age 43)
- Place of birth: La Plata, Argentina
- Height: 1.72 m (5 ft 8 in)
- Position: Winger

Youth career
- 1998–2001: Cambaceres
- 2001–2002: Estudiantes

Senior career*
Years	Team	Apps	(Gls)
2003–2008	Estudiantes	17	(0)
2004–2005	→ San Martín SJ (loan)	30	(6)
2005–2007	→ Tigre (loan)	52	(2)
2008–2009	Talleres	28	(3)
2009–2010	Asteras Tripolis	26	(2)
2010–2013	Colo-Colo	63	(7)
2012–2013	→ Zaragoza (loan)	5	(0)
2013–2017	Tigre	80	(5)
2017–2018	Arsenal de Sarandí	38	(3)
2018–2019	Temperley	17	(2)
2019–2020	Almagro	17	(1)
2020–2021	Unión San Felipe	22	(1)
2022–2024	Polideportivo Gonnet	–	(–)
- * Club domestic league appearances and goals

Lucas Daniel Wilchez (Spanish pronunciation: [ˈlukas ðaˈnjel wilˈtʃes], born 31 August 1983) is an Argentine former footballer who played as a left winger.

He began his career at the Cambaceres youth squad, then moved to La Plata and joined the football academy of his hometown club, Estudiantes, at eighteen.

The coach of Estudiantes, Reinaldo Merlo, had not assigned him to the team for the 2003–04 season, and Wilchez was loaned to San Martín de San Juan, playing with professional form during his first season in the Primera B. After another loan, he won his first title with Tigre in the third tier and returned to Tolosa in June 2007, thanks to Diego Simeone, who wanted him in the club. The next season he signed for Talleres de Córdoba, then moved to Europe after signing for Asteras Tripolis of Greece in 2009, and years later for Real Zaragoza.

In June 2010, it was confirmed that Wilchez signed for Primera División club Colo-Colo, a team led by coach Diego Cagna, who directed him years ago in Tigre. Only days after his arrival, he earned the nickname of Peter Veneno, because of his similarity with the Chilean actor who plays Daniel Alcaíno. That same year he failed to win his first professional honour because Universidad Católica gained the league title, overcoming his own team's seven-point advantage.

== Club career ==
=== Estudiantes ===
Born in La Plata, Wilchez began his career at the Defensores de Cambaceres youth ranks, but then returned to his hometown to attend the football academy of Estudiantes, progressing through the club's youth system until breaking into the reserve team. In June 2004, he was loaned to Primera B Nacional side San Martín in San Juan. In his debut season, Wilchez played 30 games and scored 6 goals, being used by the coach as a playmaker. Another two seasons out of La Plata, now on loan at Tigre, in August 2007, he returned to Estudiantes and was registered in the team squad of the Copa Sudamericana.

On 3 August 2007, he made his official debut at Estudiantes de La Plata in a 3–0 away win over Banfield at Florencio Sola as an 85th-minute substitute for Ezequiel Maggiolo. On 5 September, he made his international debut in a victory against Lanús during the Copa Sudamericana. During the season Wilchez was a frequent starter at Diego Simeone's team, but after the departure of Simeone and arrival of Roberto Sensini, he played very few games in the next season.

=== Talleres de Córdoba ===
After his unsuccessful participation with Estudiantes at the 2008 Clausura Tournament, was not retained by Sensini and days later moved to Talleres de Córdoba, signing a one-year contract for the club. He made his debut in a 1–1 away draw against Quilmes and his first goal came exactly two months later in a 2–1 victory over Los Andes.

He had a successful performance at Córdoba's squad despite Talleres' relegation to the Primera B Metropolitana. The next season Wilchez traveled to Europe and joined Super League side Asteras Tripolis. One of the principal reasons of his move was that his compatriot, Roberto Gómez, became the Hellenic team's new coach and wanted him to play at Asteras Tripolis.

=== Asteras Tripolis ===
Following their successful bid, Wilchez was presented with the number 31 shirt by Asteras Tripolis. He played alongside fellow Argentines Leonel Ríos, midfielders Sebastián Carrera and Adrián Bastía, as well as his former teammate at Talleres de Córdoba, Sebastián Bartolini. He made his debut in a 0–0 draw with AEL on 23 August, playing the game's full ninety minutes. On 27 September, he played his best match under coach Roberto Gómez in a 2–1 victory over Levadiakos, in which he was the man of the match and assisted Bastía for the first goal.

After of the departure of Gómez as coach and the arrival of Vangelis Vlachos at the Asteras Tripolis bench, he was used as a central midfielder by the new coach and played with great form, gaining three assists in two games during Vangelis' first games. The second game mentioned was an important 1–1 away draw with Super League club, Panathinaikos at Spiros Louis. On 23 January 2010, Wilchez scored twice in a 2–0 win over Panionios for his first goals in Europe.

=== Colo-Colo ===
On 19 June 2010, Colo-Colo's magazine Blanco y Negro confirmed that Wilchez joined the club on loan from Estudiantes de La Plata in a one-year deal, reuniting well with Diego Cagna, his coach when he played for Tigre. He debuted in a friendly against Paraguayan club Olimpia at Antofagasta, where he gave a good performance during the 2–2 draw. His first competitive goal came on 8 August against Unión San Felipe at Estadio Monumental in a 5–2 home victory. He incremented his goal tally two weeks later against the Santiago Wanderers, scoring the game's only goal at Playa Ancha which kept the club in the tournament's first place, three points over Universidad Católica. The club was later eliminated in the Copa Sudamericana preliminary stages by Bolivia's Universitario de Sucre after a 3–3 aggregate tie (away goals rule), considered to be a historical failure by the Chilean press and club historians.

Despite winning supporters' affections due to his performances, his charm was marred by Colo-Colo's title loss after Católica's notable comeback in which they surmounted a seven-point difference in the last five weeks.

On 5 March 2011, he scored his first goal of the season in a 2–0 home win over Unión La Calera. From Torneo Clausura onwards, Wilchez scored three goals (including a twice in a 6–2 Colo-Colo's win over Deportes La Serena) and completed the year with five goals.

=== Real Zaragoza ===
On 4 July 2012, Terra Chile confirmed that Wilchez will join La Liga side Real Zaragoza for play during the 2012–13 season at the Spanish club in a one–season deal.

== Post-retirement ==
Wilchez started a football agency called RJ Sports Group alongside a friend.

== Honours ==
Tigre

- Primera B Metropolitana (1): 2005–06
- Liguilla de Promoción (1): 2007
