= 2007–08 Argentine Primera División =

117th season of top-tier football league in Argentina

Primera División
- Season: 2007–08
- Champions: Apertura: Lanús (1st title); Clausura: River Plate (35th title)
- Relegated: Olimpo; San Martín (SJ)
- 2008 Copa Sudamericana: Estudiantes; San Lorenzo; Argentinos Juniors; Independiente
- 2009 Copa Libertadores: Lanús; River Plate
- Top goalscorer: Apertura: Germán Denis (18 goals); Clausura: Darío Cvitanich (13 goals)

The Apertura 2007 saw much success for the smaller teams in Argentine football. The eventual champions Lanús won the title for the first time in their history, the first maiden champions since Argentinos Juniors in 1984.

Second place went to Tigre, a club playing their first season in the Argentine Primera since 1980 and making their best finish ever in the top flight.

Third place went to Banfield, completing an extremely unlikely top three.

Another small club, Arsenal won the 2007 Copa Sudamericana, the first major title in their history, making them the first Argentine club other than Boca Juniors to win an international competition since San Lorenzo won the Copa Sudamericana 2002.

Another feature of the Apertura was the number of managerial changes, by the end of the Apertura there had been 12 managerial changes.

The Clausura 2008 was won by River Plate, their first title since 2004.

For the first time the 380 games of the season were broadcast live on television.

== Club locations ==
Locations of the 2007−08 Primera División teams within Greater Buenos Aires
Locations of the 2007−08 Primera División teams outside Greater Buenos Aires

== Torneo Apertura ==
=== Standings ===
Pos	Team	Pld	W	D	L	GF	GA	GD	Pts	Qualification
1	Lanús	19	11	5	3	34	21	+13	38	2009 Copa Libertadores Second Stage
2	Tigre	19	10	4	5	28	20	+8	34	
3	Banfield	19	10	2	7	22	21	+1	32	
4	Boca Juniors	19	9	4	6	32	18	+14	31	
5	Argentinos Juniors	19	9	4	6	29	20	+9	31	
6	Estudiantes (LP)	19	8	6	5	27	19	+8	30	
7	Huracán	19	8	6	5	24	21	+3	30	
8	San Lorenzo	19	8	5	6	29	27	+2	29	
9	Independiente	19	8	4	7	33	23	+10	28	
10	Vélez Sarsfield	19	8	3	8	25	25	0	27	
11	Newell's Old Boys	19	8	3	8	16	22	−6	27	
12	Arsenal	19	7	5	7	19	24	−5	26	
13	Racing	19	7	4	8	23	24	−1	25	
14	River Plate	19	6	5	8	31	33	−2	23	
15	Colón	19	6	4	9	19	22	−3	22	
16	Olimpo	19	6	4	9	18	24	−6	22	
17	Gimnasia y Esgrima (J)	19	5	5	9	22	31	−9	20	
18	Gimnasia y Esgrima (LP)	19	5	4	10	15	27	−12	19	
19	San Martín (SJ)	19	5	3	11	18	29	−11	18	
20	Rosario Central	19	2	8	9	21	33	−12	14	

Source: AFA
Rules for classification: 1st points; 2nd goal difference; 3rd goals scored; 4th head-to-head points; 5th head-to-head goal difference; 6th head-to-head goals scored. This does not apply to determining the champion. If two or more teams are tied in point at the end of the tournament, a playoff will be held at a neutral venue within 72 hours for the championship

=== Top scorers ===
Position	Player	Team	Goals
1	Germán Denis	Independiente	18
2	José Sand	Lanús	15
3	Martín Palermo	Boca Juniors	13
4	Leandro Lázzaro	Tigre	10
5	Néstor Silvera	San Lorenzo	9
5	José Vizcarra	Rosario Central	9
7	Facundo Sava	Racing	8
8	Fernando Belluschi	River Plate	7
8	Néstor Ayala	Tigre	7
8	Álvaro Pereira	Argentinos Juniors	7
8	Luis Tonelotto	San Martín (SJ)	7

== Torneo Clausura ==
Table positions as of June 22, 2008.

=== Standings ===
Pos	Team	Pld	W	D	L	GF	GA	GD	Pts	Qualification
1	River Plate	19	13	4	2	29	13	+16	43	2009 Copa Libertadores Second Stage
2	Boca Juniors	19	11	6	2	33	15	+18	39	
3	Estudiantes (LP)	19	11	6	2	30	21	+9	39	
4	San Lorenzo	19	11	2	6	30	21	+9	35	
5	Vélez Sarsfield	19	9	5	5	24	17	+7	32	
6	Independiente	19	8	7	4	25	15	+10	31	
7	Argentinos Juniors	19	9	3	7	23	24	−1	30	
8	Newell's Old Boys	19	8	5	6	21	19	+2	29	
9	Rosario Central	19	7	6	6	26	23	+3	27	
10	Arsenal	19	7	4	8	22	25	−3	25	
11	Colón	19	6	5	8	25	27	−2	23	
12	Banfield	19	6	4	9	36	36	0	22	
13	Huracán	19	5	7	7	15	17	−2	22	
14	Tigre	19	6	4	9	24	37	−13	22	
15	Olimpo	19	6	2	11	21	32	−11	20	
16	Lanús	19	5	3	11	26	39	−13	18	
17	Gimnasia y Esgrima (LP)	19	4	5	10	19	26	−7	17	
18	San Martín (SJ)	19	5	2	12	20	30	−10	17	
19	Gimnasia y Esgrima (J)	19	2	9	8	20	28	−8	15	
20	Racing	19	2	9	8	14	22	−8	15	

Source: AFA
Rules for classification: 1st points; 2nd goal difference; 3rd goals scored; 4th head-to-head points; 5th head-to-head goal difference; 6th head-to-head goals scored. This does not apply to determining the champion. If two or more teams are tied in point at the end of the tournament, a playoff will be held at a neutral venue within 72 hours for the championship

=== Top scorers ===
Positions as of June 25, 2008

Position	Player	Team	Goals
1	(Argentina) Darío Cvitanich	Banfield	13
2	(Argentina) Martín Palermo	Boca Juniors	10
3	(Argentina) Martín Bravo	San Martín (San Juan)	9
3	(Argentina) Germán Denis	Independiente	9
3	(Paraguay) Santiago Salcedo	Newell's Old Boys	9
3	(Argentina) Diego Buonanotte	River Plate	9
7	(Argentina) Rubén Ramírez	Colón	8
7	(Argentina) Luciano Leguizamón	Arsenal	8
7	(Argentina) César Carranza	Gimnasia (Jujuy)	8
9	(Argentina) Daniel Montenegro	Independiente	7
9	(Uruguay) Santiago Silva	Vélez Sársfield	7
9	(Argentina) Gonzalo Bergessio	San Lorenzo	7
9	(Argentina) José Sand	Lanús	7

== Relegation ==
Pos	Team	2005–06 Pts	2006–07 Pts	2007–08 Pts	Total Pts	Total Pld	Avg	Relegation
1	Boca Juniors	83	83	70	236	114	2.07	
2	Estudiantes (LP)	52	81	69	202	114	1.772	
3	River Plate	62	71	66	199	114	1.746	
4	San Lorenzo	56	73	64	193	114	1.693	
5	Vélez Sarsfield	58	56	59	173	114	1.518	
6	Lanús	58	59	56	173	114	1.518	
7	Independiente	55	57	59	171	114	1.5	
8	Tigre	0	0	56	56	38	1.474	
9	Argentinos Juniors	50	46	61	157	114	1.377	
10	Arsenal	44	62	51	157	114	1.377	
11	Huracán	0	0	52	52	38	1.368	
12	Banfield	59	39	54	152	114	1.333	
13	Gimnasia y Esgrima (LP)	69	40	36	145	114	1.272	
14	Newell's Old Boys	51	38	53	142	114	1.246	
15	Rosario Central	45	52	41	138	114	1.211	
16	Colón	46	46	45	137	114	1.202	
17	Racing	44	49	40	133	114	1.167	Relegation Playoff Matches
18	Gimnasia y Esgrima (J)	51	43	35	129	114	1.132	Relegation Playoff Matches
19	Olimpo	0	0	42	42	38	1.105	Relegated to the Primera B Nacional
20	San Martín (SJ)	0	0	35	35	38	0.921	Relegated to the Primera B Nacional

Updated as of June 22, 2008; Source:AFA

=== Promotion playoff ===
Teams and schedules will be decided based on average after the end of the Closing tournament. The first and second legs of the final are scheduled to be played on June 25 and June 29, respectively.

Date Time	Venue	Home team	Score	Away team	Referee	Match Report(s)
2008-06-25; 17:00 ET	Estadio 15 de Abril, Santa Fe	Unión; Serrizuela 44'	1-1	Gimnasia (Jujuy); Carranza 34'	Alejandro Sabino	Report (in Spanish)
2008-06-29; 17:10 ET	Estadio 23 de Agosto, San Salvador de Jujuy	Gimnasia (Jujuy); Arraya 68'	1-0	Unión	Diego Abal	Report (in Spanish)

Gimnasia (Jujuy) wins 2-1 and stays in the Argentine First Division, while Unión de Santa Fe does not get promoted and remains in Argentine Nacional B.

Date Time	Venue	Home team	Score	Away team	Referee	Match Report(s)
2008-06-25; 20:10 ET	Estadio Córdoba, Córdoba	Belgrano; Gigli 76'	1-1	Racing; Sava 14'	Gustavo Bassi	Report (in Spanish)
2008-06-29; 14:10 ET	Presidente Perón, Avellaneda	Racing; Moralez 10'	1-0	Belgrano	Sergio Pezzotta	Report (in Spanish)

Racing wins 2-1 and stays in the Argentine First Division, while Belgrano does not get promoted and remains in Argentine Nacional B.

== International qualification ==
=== Copa Sudamericana ===
Qualification for the 2008 Copa Sudamericana is determined from an aggregate table of the Apertura and Clausura tournaments. The top four teams in the aggregate table qualify; Boca Juniors and River Plate are invited regardless of their standings in the season, this season Arsenal was also invited as defending champions.

==== Aggregate table ====
Pos	Team	Pld	W	D	L	GF	GA	GD	Pts	Qualification
1	Boca Juniors	38	20	10	8	65	33	+32	70	2008 Copa Sudamericana Round of 16
2	Estudiantes (LP)	38	19	12	7	56	35	+21	69	2008 Copa Sudamericana First Stage
3	River Plate	38	19	9	10	60	46	+14	66	2008 Copa Sudamericana Round of 16
4	San Lorenzo	38	19	7	12	59	48	+11	64	2008 Copa Sudamericana First Stage
5	Argentinos Juniors	38	18	7	13	52	44	+8	61	2008 Copa Sudamericana First Stage
6	Independiente	38	16	11	11	58	38	+20	59	2008 Copa Sudamericana First Stage
7	Vélez Sarsfield	38	17	8	13	49	42	+7	59	
8	Lanús	38	16	8	14	60	60	0	56	
9	Newell's Old Boys	38	16	8	14	37	41	−4	56	
10	Tigre	38	16	8	14	52	57	−5	56	
11	Banfield	38	16	6	16	58	57	+1	54	
12	Huracán	38	13	13	12	39	39	0	52	
13	Arsenal	38	14	9	15	41	49	−8	51	2008 Copa Sudamericana First Stage
14	Colón	38	12	9	17	44	49	−5	45	
15	Olimpo	38	12	6	20	39	56	−17	42	
16	Rosario Central	38	9	14	15	47	56	−9	41	
17	Racing	38	9	13	16	37	46	−9	40	
18	Gimnasia y Esgrima (LP)	38	9	9	20	34	53	−19	36	
19	Gimnasia y Esgrima (J)	38	7	14	17	42	59	−17	35	
20	San Martín (SJ)	38	10	5	23	38	59	−21	35	

Source: AFA
Rules for classification: 1st points; 2nd head-to-head points; 3rd head-to-head goal difference; 4th head-to-head goals

== Managerial Changes ==
This is a list of the managerial changes in the Argentine Primera during the 2007-2008 season.

Club	Manager out	Replaced by
Gimnasia (La Plata)	Francisco Maturana	1st Julio Falcioni 2nd Guillermo Sanguinetti
Argentinos Juniors	Ricardo Caruso Lombardi	Néstor Gorosito
Huracán	Antonio Mohamed	1st Osvaldo Ardiles 2nd Claudio Ubeda
Newell's Old Boys	Pablo Marini	1st Ricardo Caruso Lombardi 2nd Fernando Gamboa
Olimpo	Guillermo Rivarola	1st Roberto Saporiti 2nd Daniel Florit
Rosario Central	Carlos Ischia	Leonardo Madelón
Gimnasia (Jujuy)	Mario Gómez	1st Carlos Ramaciotti 2nd Omar Labruna
Vélez Sársfield	Ricardo La Volpe	Hugo Tocalli
River Plate	Daniel Passarella	Diego Simeone
Racing	Gustavo Costas	1st Miguel Ángel Micó 2nd Juan Manuel Llop
Estudiantes	Diego Simeone	Roberto Sensini
Boca Juniors	Miguel Ángel Russo	Carlos Ischia
Colón	Leonardo Astrada	Antonio Mohamed
Independiente	Pedro Troglio	1st Miguel Ángel Santoro 2nd Claudio Borghi
Banfield	Juan Manuel Llop	1st Miguel Jerez 2nd Jorge Burruchaga
San Lorenzo	Ramón Díaz	Miguel Ángel Russo
Arsenal	Gustavo Alfaro	Daniel Garnero
Lanús	Ramón Cabrero	Luis Zubeldía

== Transfers ==
See List of Argentine Primera División transfers (2007–08 season)

== See also ==
- 2007–08 in Argentine football
