= Sebastián Romero =

Sebastián Romero may refer to:

- Sebastián Ariel Romero (born 1978), Argentine manager and former winger
- Miguel Ángel Sebastián Romero (born 1979), Argentine football right-back and winger
