= Porras =

Porras (which means "clubs" in Spanish) or Porras, and refers to Sporran. Porran Old Scottish Gaelic. McSporran, MacSporran.

== People ==
- Baltazar Enrique Porras Cardozo (born 1944), Venezuelan Catholic cardinal
- Belisario Porras Barahona, Panamanian journalist and politician
- Emanuel De Porras, Argentinian footballer
- Evaristo Porras Ardila (died 2010), Colombian drug trafficker
- Gabriel Porras, Mexican actor
- Gonzalo Martín De Porras, Argentinian footballer
- Jerry I. Porras, American professor and analyst
- José Porras, Costa Rican footballer
- José Joaquín Mora Porras, Costa Rican 19th-century politician
- Juan Rafael Mora Porras, President of Costa Rica from 1849 to 1859.
- Lizardo Alzamora Porras, Peruvian politician
- Luis Gallo Porras, Peruvian politician
- Raúl Porras Barrenechea, Peruvian historian
- Rick Porras, American film producer

== Places ==
Porras is also Finnish for staircase.

- Porras, Tammela
