= Facundo Pérez Castro =

Argentine footballer

Personal information
- Full name: Facundo Javier Pérez Castro
- Date of birth: August 7, 1981 (age 45)
- Place of birth: San Miguel de Tucumán, Argentina
- Height: 1.76 m (5 ft 9 in)
- Position: Defensive midfielder

Youth career
- Defensa y Justicia

Senior career*
| Years | Team | Apps | (Gls) |
| 1999–2007 | Argentinos Juniors | 191 | (3) |
| 2007–2008 | Gimnasia de Jujuy | 15 | (1) |
| 2008–2009 | San Martín de Tucumán | 34 | (0) |
| 2009–2010 | Arsenal de Sarandí | 25 | (0) |
| 2010–2011 | Olympiacos Volos | 7 | (0) |
| 2011 | Shanghai Shenhua | 24 | (0) |
| 2012–2013 | Defensa y Justicia | 29 | (0) |

International career
| 2001 | Argentina U-20 | 5 | (0) |
- * Club domestic league appearances and goals

Facundo Javier Pérez Castro (Latin American Spanish: [faˈkundo ˈpeɾes ˈkastɾo]; born 7 August 1981 in San Miguel de Tucumán, Tucumán Province) is an Argentine football midfielder.

== Career ==
Pérez Castro came through Argentinos Juniors' youth system to make his debut for the club in 1999. He played for the club until 2007, in 2002 the club were relegated to the Primera B Nacional but Pérez Castro stayed with them and helped them to secure promotion back to the Primera Division in 2004.

Pérez Castro moved to Gimnasia for the start of Apertura 2007 tournament, but he was separated from the professional team by Carlos Ramacciotti in January 2008. However, when Omar Labruna replaced Ramacciotti as Gimnasia's manager Pérez Castro returned to the first team and even scored his first goal with the club against Lanús.

He played the 2008-09 season for San Martín de Tucumán but could not help his team to avoid relegation. The following season, he was acquired by Arsenal de Sarandí.

For the 2010–11 he played for Olympiacos Volos in the Super League Greece.
