= Gabriel Loeschbor =

Argentine footballer (born 1977)

Personal information
- Full name: Gabriel Alejandro Loeschbor
- Date of birth: 4 June 1977 (age 49)
- Place of birth: Santa Fe, Argentina
- Height: 1.86 m (6 ft 1 in)
- Position: Centre back

Senior career*
Years	Team	Apps	(Gls)
1997–2001	Rosario Central	73	(2)
2001–2002	Racing Club	34	(4)
2002–2003	Rennes	4	(0)
2003–2004	Real Murcia	17	(0)
2004–2005	San Lorenzo	11	(0)
2005	River Plate	6	(0)
2006	Rosario Central	8	(1)
2006–2007	Arsenal de Sarandí	26	(0)
2007–2009	Gimnasia de Jujuy	64	(3)
2009–2010	Independiente Rivadavia	35	(4)
2010–2011	Belgrano	12	(0)
- * Club domestic league appearances and goals

Gabriel Alejandro Loeschbor (born 4 June 1977 in Santa Fe) is an Argentine retired football defender.

== Career ==
Gabriel Loeschbor started his career in 1997 with Rosario Central where he played until 2001 reaching the semi-finals of that year's Copa Libertadores. Later that same year he moved to Racing Club and helped the club to end a 35-year drought by winning the Apertura 2001 championship. Loeschbor was a usual first team player during the tournament and he scored the championship goal in the last game against Vélez Sársfield.

Being part of a championship winning team brought him to the attention of several European clubs. The defender was signed by French club Rennes in 2002. After one season with Rennes Loeschbor moved to Spain to play for Real Murcia.

In 2004, he returned to Argentina where he played for San Lorenzo and River Plate and had a second spell with Rosario Central. In 2006, he signed for Arsenal de Sarandí, where he qualified with the team for the Copa Sudamericana and Copa Libertadores, and in 2007 he moved to Gimnasia de Jujuy, where he avoided relegation at the end of the 2007–08 season.

== Personal ==
Loeschbor holds a German passport.

== Titles ==
Season	Club	Title
Apertura 2001	Racing Club	Argentine Primera División
