= Juan Sosa (footballer) =

Argentine footballer (born 1985)

Personal information
- Full name: Juan Manuel Sosa
- Date of birth: 11 February 1985 (age 41)
- Place of birth: San Justo, Argentina
- Height: 1.84 m (6 ft 1/2 in)
- Position: Midfielder

Team information
- Current team: Sportivo Italiano

Senior career*
| Years | Team | Apps | (Gls) |
| 2002–2007 | Huracán | 39 | (1) |
| 2007 | Ferro Carril Oeste | 11 | (1) |
| 2008 | Newell's Old Boys | 1 | (0) |
| 2008–2009 | Almirante Brown | 18 | (1) |
| 2009–2010 | Macará | 8 | (0) |
| 2010 | Ferro Carril Oeste | 9 | (0) |
| 2011 | Mixto | 0 | (0) |
| 2011–2013 | Estudiantes BA | 64 | (2) |
| 2013–2021 | Defensores de Belgrano | 220 | (3) |
| 2022– | Sportivo Italiano | 11 | (1) |
- * Club domestic league appearances and goals as of 17:54, 13 July 2022 (UTC)

Juan Manuel Sosa (born 11 February 1985) is an Argentine professional footballer who plays as a midfielder for Sportivo Italiano.

== Career ==
Sosa's career started in 2002 with Huracán. He appeared in two fixtures during the 2002–03 Argentine Primera División season, which concluded with relegation to Primera B Nacional; which allowed Sosa to make thirty-seven more appearances and score one goal for Huracán up until 2007. He departed midway through the year to play for Ferro Carril Oeste, before returning to the top-flight with Newell's Old Boys in 2008. His stint with them lasted just a few months, with the midfielder subsequently agreeing to join Almirante Brown of Primera B Metropolitana. His first goal for the club arrived on 15 March 2009 against Tristán Suárez.

June 2009 saw Sosa depart his homeland to play in Ecuador for Macará. Twelve appearances followed, which included his Serie A debut versus Barcelona. A return to Ferro Carril Oeste was confirmed ahead of the 2010–11 Primera B Nacional, prior to Sosa competing a move to Brazilian Campeonato Mato-Grossense side Mixto in 2011. In the same year, Sosa joined Primera B Metropolitana's Estudiantes. He remained for 2011–12 and 2012–13. Fellow third tier team Defensores de Belgrano signed Sosa on 30 June 2013. He played one hundred and seventy-six times across six seasons, which culminated with promotion.

== Career statistics ==
As of 16 December 2018.

Club statistics
| Club | Season | League | | | Cup (Note: Includes the Copa Argentina) | | League Cup | | Continental | | Other | | Total | |
| Club | Season | Division | Apps | Goals | Apps | Goals | Apps | Goals | Apps | Goals | Apps | Goals | Apps | Goals |
|---|---|---|---|---|---|---|---|---|---|---|---|---|---|---|
| Huracán | 2002–03 | Primera División | 2 | 0 | 0 | 0 | — | | — | | 0 | 0 | 2 | 0 |
| Ferro Carril Oeste | 2007–08 | Primera B Nacional | 11 | 1 | 0 | 0 | — | | — | | 0 | 0 | 11 | 1 |
| Newell's Old Boys | 2007–08 | Primera División | 1 | 0 | 0 | 0 | — | | — | | 0 | 0 | 1 | 0 |
| Almirante Brown | 2008–09 | Primera B Metropolitana | 18 | 1 | 0 | 0 | — | | — | | 0 | 0 | 18 | 1 |
| Macará | 2009 | Serie A | 8 | 0 | 0 | 0 | — | | — | | 4 (Note: Four appearances in the 2009 Serie A play-offs) | 0 | 12 | 0 |
| Ferro Carril Oeste | 2010–11 | Primera B Nacional | 9 | 0 | 0 | 0 | — | | — | | 0 | 0 | 9 | 0 |
| Mixto | 2011 | Campeonato Mato-Grossense | — | | 0 | 0 | — | | — | | 0 | 0 | 0 | 0 |
| Estudiantes | 2011–12 | Primera B Metropolitana | 32 | 1 | 1 | 1 | — | | — | | 0 | 0 | 33 | 2 |
| Estudiantes | 2012–13 | Primera B Metropolitana | 32 | 1 | 3 | 0 | — | | — | | 0 | 0 | 35 | 1 |
| Estudiantes | Total | | 64 | 2 | 4 | 0 | — | | — | | 0 | 0 | 68 | 2 |
| Defensores de Belgrano | 2013–14 | Primera B Metropolitana | 37 | 0 | 1 | 0 | — | | — | | 0 | 0 | 38 | 0 |
| Defensores de Belgrano | 2014 | Primera C Metropolitana | 16 | 1 | 0 | 0 | — | | — | | 0 | 0 | 16 | 1 |
| Defensores de Belgrano | 2015 | Primera B Metropolitana | 38 | 0 | 0 | 0 | — | | — | | 2 (Note: Two appearances in the 2015 Primera B Metropolitana play-offs) | 0 | 40 | 0 |
| Defensores de Belgrano | 2016 | Primera B Metropolitana | 15 | 0 | 0 | 0 | — | | — | | 0 | 0 | 15 | 0 |
| Defensores de Belgrano | 2016–17 | Primera B Metropolitana | 31 | 2 | 3 | 0 | — | | — | | 1 (Note: One appearance in the 2016–17 Primera B Metropolitana play-offs) | 0 | 35 | 2 |
| Defensores de Belgrano | 2017–18 | Primera B Metropolitana | 31 | 0 | 0 | 0 | — | | — | | 5 (Note: Five appearances in the 2017–18 Primera B Metropolitana play-offs) | 0 | 36 | 0 |
| Defensores de Belgrano | 2018–19 | Primera B Nacional | 4 | 0 | 1 | 0 | — | | — | | 0 | 0 | 5 | 0 |
| Defensores de Belgrano | Total | | 172 | 3 | 5 | 0 | — | | — | | 8 | 0 | 185 | 3 |
| Career total | | | 285 | 7 | 9 | 1 | — | | — | | 12 | 0 | 306 | 8 |
