= Walter Ribonetto =

Argentine footballer

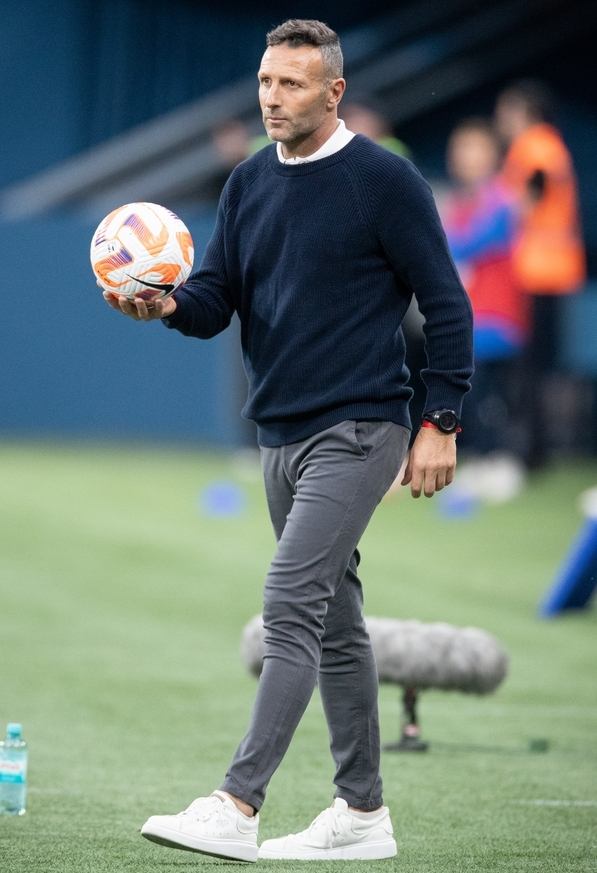

Personal information
- Full name: Walter Darío Ribonetto
- Date of birth: 9 July 1974 (age 52)
- Place of birth: Corral de Bustos, Argentina
- Height: 1.80 m (5 ft 11 in)
- Position: Centre back

Team information
- Current team: Everton de Viña del Mar (manager)

Senior career*
| Years | Team | Apps | (Gls) |
| 2001–2003 | Lanús | 45 | (1) |
| 2004 | Querétano | 17 | (0) |
| 2004 | Junior | 16 | (3) |
| 2005–2006 | Olimpia | 30 | (5) |
| 2006–2007 | Lanús | 55 | (5) |
| 2008–2009 | Rosario Central | 46 | (0) |
| 2009–2010 | Quilmes | 33 | (1) |
| 2010–2012 | Talleres | 31 | (2) |

Managerial career
- 2019–2020: Argentinos Juniors (assistant)
- 2021: San Lorenzo (assistant)
- 2021–2022: Banfield (assistant)
- 2022: Huracán (assistant)
- 2022–2023: Talleres (reserves)
- 2024: Talleres
- 2024–2025: Melgar
- 2025: Godoy Cruz
- 2026–: Everton de Viña del Mar
- * Club domestic league appearances and goals

Walter Darío Ribonetto (born 9 July 1974) is an Argentine football manager and former player who played as a centre back. He is the current manager of Everton de Viña del Mar.

== Career ==
Born in Corral de Bustos, Córdoba, Ribonetto did not make his professional debut until the age of 27, until then he had only played amateur football in the Corral de Bustos local leagues. He made his professional debut for Lanús in 2001, playing for the club until 2003, he then joined Querétaro F.C. in Mexico.

After playing in Mexico, Ribonetto joined Junior in Colombia and then Olimpia in Paraguay before returning to Argentina in 2006 to resume his career at Lanús. In 2007, he was part of the squad that won the 2007 Apertura tournament, Lanús' first ever top flight league title.

During the 2009–10 season, Ribonetto gained promotion to the Argentine Primera with Quilmes. For the following season, he joined regionalized third division side Talleres de Córdoba.

== Managerial statistics ==
As of 7 November 2026

Managerial record by team and tenure
| Team | Nat | From | To | Record | | | | | | | |
| Team | Nat | From | To | G | W | D | L | GF | GA | GD | Win % |
|---|---|---|---|---|---|---|---|---|---|---|---|
| Talleres | (Argentina) | 20 December 2023 | 26 August 2024 | 36 | 17 | 12 | 7 | 56 | 39 | +17 | 47.22 |
| Melgar | (Peru) | 11 November 2024 | 27 July 2025 | 30 | 13 | 8 | 9 | 39 | 38 | +1 | 43.33 |
| Godoy Cruz | (Argentina) | 9 August 2025 | 20 October 2025 | 11 | 1 | 4 | 6 | 8 | 16 | −8 | 9.09 |
| Everton | (Chile) | 10 March 2026 | present | 35 | 12 | 11 | 12 | 55 | 49 | +6 | 34.29 |
| Total | | | | 112 | 43 | 35 | 34 | 158 | 142 | +16 | 38.39 |

== Honours ==
=== Player ===
Lanús

- Argentine Primera División: Apertura 2007
