= Rodrigo Archubi =

Argentine footballer (born 1985)

Personal information
- Full name: Rodrigo Javier Archubi
- Date of birth: June 6, 1985 (age 41)
- Place of birth: Remedios de Escalada, Argentina
- Height: 1.82 m (5 ft 11 1/2 in)
- Position: Midfielder

Youth career
- Sportivo Italiano

Senior career*
Years	Team	Apps	(Gls)
2003–2008	Lanús	56	(12)
2007–2008	→ Olympiacos (loan)	4	(0)
2008–2010	River Plate	22	(7)
2011	Juventude	8	(3)
2011–2012	Kazma	13	(5)
2012–2014	Boca Unidos	13	(0)
2014–2018	Sportivo Italiano	47	(4)
2018–2019	Sportivo Dock Sud	15	(0)

International career
2005	Argentina U-20	3	(0)
- * Club domestic league appearances and goals as of 23:28, 18 January 2010 (UTC)

Rodrigo Archubi (born 6 June 1985 in Remedios de Escalada) is an Argentine football winger, who last played for Sportivo Dock Sud.

== Career ==
Archubi of Greek origin began his playing career in 2003 with Club Atlético Lanús. He made his debut in a 0–1 home defeat to Arsenal de Sarandí on 29 June 2003. He made his international club debut for the club in the 2006 Copa Sudamericana where he scored 4 goals in 6 appearances.

In 2007, he joined Greek side as a major signing, Olympiacos however he did not settle in his country of origin and returned to Argentina in January 2008 to play for River Plate. He won the Greek Super Cup in October 2007.

He made his Copa Libertadores debut in 2008 for River Plate and was part of the squad that won the Clausura 2008 tournament.

Following a 2–2 draw with Gimnasia y Esgrima de La Plata, Archubi failed a doping test which could have resulted in a 2-year ban from football, but he received only a 3-month suspension beginning in January 2010 as he was found to have taken "recreational drugs" (cannabis) rather than "medically prohibited drugs". Archubi was subsequently released by River Plate.

In 2011, Archubi started training in Esporte Clube Juventude, from Caxias do Sul, Brazil.

In August 2011, Archubi sign to Kuwaiti Premier League side Kazma for £500.000 for one season, he performed very well with Kazma, however had difficulty adopting to the heat and culture in Kuwait.

In 2012, he joined Argentine side Boca Unidos club from Corrientes Province.

== Youth international ==
In 2005 Archubi was part of the Argentina Under-20 team that won the FIFA World Youth Championship.

== Titles ==
Olympiacos

- Greek Super Cup: 2007

River Plate

- Argentine Primera: Clausura 2008

Argentina

- FIFA World Youth Championship: 2005
