= Lucas Alessandría =

Argentine footballer

Personal information
- Full name: Lucas Ramón Alessandría
- Date of birth: April 5, 1978 (age 48)
- Place of birth: Rafaela, Argentina
- Height: 1.80 m (5 ft 11 in)
- Position: Defender

Team information
- Current team: Unión de Santa Fe

Senior career*
Years	Team	Apps	(Gls)
1997–2003	Lanús	175	(4)
2003–04	Leganés	38	(1)
2004–05	Lanús	22	(0)
2005–06	Quilmes	21	(0)
2006–07	Ponferradina	27	(0)
2007–08	Tigre	14	(0)
2008–09	Unión de Santa Fe	28	(0)
2010	9 de Julio de Rafaela		(1)
2010–	Temperley		

International career
2000	Argentina U-23	2	(0)
- * Club domestic league appearances and goals as of 14 April 2008

Lucas Ramón Alessandría (born 5 April 1978) is an Argentine football defender currently playing for Unión de Santa Fe in Argentina. He has played club football for several clubs in Argentina and Spain.

Alessandría started his professional career with Club Atlético Lanús in 1997. He played for the club until 2003 when he spent a season with CD Leganés in Spain. Alessandría returned to Lanús in 2004, during his two spells with the club he amassed nearly 200 appearances, scoring 4 goals.

In 2005 Alessandría joined Quilmes but left after only one season to return to Spanish football where he joined Ponferradina in 2006.

In 2007 Alessandría joined newly promoted Tigre for the Apertura 2007 which was Tigre's first season in the Primera since 1980. The club finished in 2nd place which was the highest league finish in their history.
