= Carlos Sciucatti =

Argentine footballer

Personal information
- Full name: Carlos Raúl Sciucatti
- Date of birth: 7 January 1986 (age 40)
- Place of birth: Buenos Aires, Argentina
- Height: 1.80 m (5 ft 11 in)
- Position: Striker

Senior career*
Years	Team	Apps	(Gls)
2005–2007	Independiente	12	(1)
2007	Academia	18	(4)
2008	Persijap Jepara	12	(1)
2009	Persela Lamongan	14	(5)
2009–2010	Persidafon Dafonsoro	17	(3)
2010–2011	Pro Duta	12	(2)
2011–2013	PSLS Lhokseumawe	15	(14)
2014	Persijap Jepara	8	(1)
2015	Mitra Kukar F.C.	6	(4)
Total		116	(35)
- * Club domestic league appearances and goals

Carlos Raúl Sciucatti (born 7 January 1986, in Buenos Aires) is an Argentine former footballer.

== Careers ==
=== Argentina ===
He played for Independiente de Avellaneda from January 2006 to June 2007 in the Argentina Primera Division with 2 caps and 1 goal

=== Colombia ===
He transferred from Independiente to Academia. He played for Academia from July 2007 to December 2007.

=== Indonesia ===
He started his career in Indonesia it the club Persijap Jepara. In the winter transfer window of the 2008-09 season he moved to Persela Lamongan and he scored 5 goals in 14 matches. In summer transfer he moved to Persidafon Dafonsoro. And now he is a free agent.
