= Francisco Maciel (footballer) =

Argentine footballer

Personal information
- Full name: Francisco Diego Maciel
- Date of birth: September 17, 1977 (age 49)
- Place of birth: Buenos Aires, Argentina
- Height: 1.77 m (5 ft 10 in)
- Position: Defender

Senior career*
| Years | Team | Apps | (Gls) |
| 1995–1996 | Yupanqui | 32 | (4) |
| 1996–1997 | Deportivo Español | 1 | (0) |
| 1998–2001 | Almagro | 99 | (9) |
| 2001–2002 | Racing Club | 55 | (1) |
| 2002–2005 | Real Murcia | 88 | (2) |
| 2005–2006 | RCD Mallorca | 19 | (0) |
| 2006–2007 | Racing Club | 17 | (0) |
| 2008 | Huracán | 1 | (0) |
| 2009 | Bolívar | 4 | (0) |
- * Club domestic league appearances and goals as of September 14, 2009

Francisco Diego Maciel (born September 17, 1977, in Buenos Aires) is a retired Argentine footballer who played as a right back.

Maciel made his debut in the Argentine Primera with Deportivo Español on December 8, 1996, against Rosario Central. In 1998, he was signed by Club Almagro, where he played for the next three years. Subsequently, his solid performance bought him a transferred to Racing Club. In his first spell with Racing the club won the Clausura 2001, the first title for the club in 35 years. In 2002 Maciel moved to Spain and spent some time playing for Real Murcia and RCD Mallorca. In 2006, he returned to Argentina and got signed by Racing. His second spell with the academia lasted until late 2007. The following year he transferred to Club Atlético Huracán, but since his arrival he was condemned to the bench, making only a single appearance for Huracán. After he left the club, he was inactive for seven months, until he got an offer from Bolivian side Bolívar for which he signed in July 2009.

== Club titles ==
| Season | Club | Title |
|---|---|---|
| Apertura 2001 | Racing Club | Primera División Argentina |
