= Diego Manicero =

Argentine footballer

Personal information
- Full name: Diego Ariel Franco Manicero
- Date of birth: 24 May 1985 (age 41)
- Place of birth: Villa del Rosario, Argentina
- Height: 1.68 m (5 ft 6 in)
- Position: Midfielder

Senior career*
Years	Team	Apps	(Gls)
2003–2010	Lanús	45	(3)
2008	→ Racing Club (loan)	6	(7)
2008–2009	→ Belgrano (loan)	6	(0)
2010–2012	Alumni VM	40	(5)
2012	Coquimbo Unido	15	(1)
2013–2014	León de Huánuco	59	(10)
2015–2016	Sporting Cristal	16	(2)
2016–2018	Universitario	73	(11)
2019	Carlos A. Mannucci	24	(1)
2020	Carlos Stein	26	(6)
2021	Alianza Universidad	20	(5)
2022	Sport Huancayo	22	(1)
2023	Carlos Stein	20	(4)
2023	Alumni VM	6	(2)
- * Club domestic league appearances and goals as of 26 September 2024

Diego Ariel Franco Manicero (born 24 May 1985) is an Argentine footballer who plays as a midfielder.

== Teams ==
- (Argentina) Lanús 2003–2010
- (Argentina) Racing Club (loan) 2008
- (Argentina) Belgrano (loan) 2008–2009
- (Argentina) Alumni de Villa María 2010–2012
- (Chile) Coquimbo Unido 2012
- (Peru) León de Huánuco 2013–2014
- (Peru) Sporting Cristal 2015–2016
- (Peru) Universitario 2016–2018
- (Peru) Carlos A. Mannucci 2019
- (Peru) Carlos Stein 2020
- (Peru) Alianza Universidad 2021
- (Peru) Sport Huancayo 2022
- (Peru) Carlos Stein 2023
- (Argentina) Alumni de Villa María 2023

== Honours ==
=== Player ===
Lanus

- Argentine Primera División (1): 2007 Apertura

Sporting Club

- Peruvian Primera División (1): 2015 Descentralizado

Universitario

- Peruvian Primera División (1): 2016 Descentralizado
