= Gastón Montero =

Argentine professional footballer

Personal information
- Full name: Gastón Eduardo Montero
- Date of birth: 23 March 1986 (age 40)
- Place of birth: Buenos Aires, Argentina
- Height: 1.76 m (5 ft 9 in)
- Position: Left-back

Team information
- Current team: Almirante Brown

Youth career
- Vélez Sarsfield

Senior career*
Years	Team	Apps	(Gls)
2007	Vélez Sarsfield	5	(0)
2008	Gimnasia y Esgrima	10	(0)
2009	Los Andes	16	(2)
2009	San Martín SJ	1	(0)
2010	San Martín T.	11	(0)
2010–2011	Platense	19	(0)
2011–2014	Estudiantes	91	(3)
2014	Deportivo Morón	17	(0)
2015–2020	Deportivo Riestra	142	(4)
2020	Almirante Brown	3	(0)
2021	Deportivo Riestra	11	(1)
2022–	Almirante Brown	2	(0)
- * Club domestic league appearances and goals as of 19:30, 8 June 2022 (UTC)

Gastón Eduardo Montero (born 23 March 1986) is an Argentine professional footballer who plays as a left-back for Almirante Brown.

== Career ==
Montero started his career with Primera División side Vélez Sarsfield. After five top-flight appearances for the club, Montero moved across the division in 2008 to Gimnasia y Esgrima. He participated in five fixtures in both the 2007–08 and 2008–09 campaigns. Montero departed midway through the latter, signing for Los Andes of Primera B Nacional. He scored on his debut for them, netting in a 3–2 victory over Defensa y Justicia on 13 February 2009. A further goal against Instituto arrived in eighteen total appearances. Montero split his time in 2009–10 with San Martín namesakes from San Juan and San Miguel de Tucumán.

After spending twelve months with Platense in Primera B Metropolitana, Montero completed a move to Estudiantes on 13 July 2011. His first goal for them came in a 1–1 draw on 14 October 2012 with Brown, a fixture that also saw him sent off in stoppage time. Deportivo Morón became Montero's eighth team in mid-2014, though the defender would depart in the succeeding January to fellow third tier outfit Deportivo Riestra. Eighty-seven matches and three goals came across 2015, 2016 and 2016–17, with the latter concluding with promotion via the play-offs; though they were subsequently relegated back after one season.

After one hundred and fifty-one appearances and four goals in five years with Riestra, Montero departed in August 2020 to Almirante Brown; reuniting with Jorge Benítez, who managed Montero at Riestra between July 2016 and September 2018.

== Career statistics ==
As of 30 August 2020.

Appearances and goals by club, season and competition
Club	Season	League			Cup		League Cup		Continental		Other		Total	
Club	Season	Division	Apps	Goals	Apps	Goals	Apps	Goals	Apps	Goals	Apps	Goals	Apps	Goals
Vélez Sarsfield	2006–07	Primera División	0	0	0	0	—		1 (Note: Appearance(s) in the Copa Libertadores)	0	0	0	1	0
Vélez Sarsfield	2007–08	Primera División	5	0	0	0	—		—		0	0	5	0
Vélez Sarsfield	Total		5	0	0	0	—		1	0	0	0	6	0
Gimnasia y Esgrima	2007–08	Primera División	5	0	0	0	—		—		0	0	5	0
Gimnasia y Esgrima	2008–09	Primera División	5	0	0	0	—		—		0	0	5	0
Gimnasia y Esgrima	Total		10	0	0	0	—		—		0	0	10	0
Los Andes	2008–09	Primera B Nacional	16	2	0	0	—		—		2 (Note: Appearance(s) in the Primera B Metropolitana play-offs)	0	18	2
San Martín (SJ)	2009–10	Primera B Nacional	1	0	0	0	—		—		0	0	1	0
San Martín (T)	2009–10	Primera B Nacional	11	0	0	0	—		—		0	0	11	0
Platense	2010–11	Primera B Metropolitana	19	0	0	0	—		—		0	0	19	0
Estudiantes	2011–12	Primera B Metropolitana	23	1	1	0	—		—		0	0	24	1
Estudiantes	2012–13	Primera B Metropolitana	33	2	4	0	—		—		0	0	37	2
Estudiantes	2013–14	Primera B Metropolitana	35	0	6	0	—		—		0	0	41	0
Estudiantes	Total		91	3	11	0	—		—		0	0	102	3
Deportivo Morón	2014	Primera B Metropolitana	17	0	0	0	—		—		1	0	18	0
Deportivo Riestra	2015	Primera B Metropolitana	35	2	3	0	—		—		0	0	38	2
Deportivo Riestra	2016	Primera B Metropolitana	17	0	0	0	—		—		0	0	17	0
Deportivo Riestra	2016–17	Primera B Metropolitana	28	1	1	0	—		—		3	0	32	1
Deportivo Riestra	2017–18	Primera B Nacional	13	1	1	0	—		—		0	0	14	1
Deportivo Riestra	2018–19	Primera B Metropolitana	30	0	1	0	—		—		0	0	31	0
Deportivo Riestra	2019–20	Primera B Nacional	19	0	0	0	—		—		0	0	19	0
Deportivo Riestra	Total		142	4	6	0	—		—		3	0	151	4
Almirante Brown	2020–21	Primera B Metropolitana	0	0	0	0	—		—		0	0	0	0
Career total			312	9	17	0	—		1	0	6	0	336	9
