= Leandro Fleitas =

Argentine football defender

Personal information
- Full name: Leandro Roberto Fleitas
- Date of birth: December 29, 1983 (age 42)
- Place of birth: Moreno, Argentina
- Height: 1.80 m (5 ft 11 in)
- Position: Defender

Team information
- Current team: César Vallejo
- Number: 4

Senior career*
Years	Team	Apps	(Gls)
2003–2006	Argentinos Juniors	47	(3)
2006–2007	→ Olimpo (loan)	31	(3)
2007–2008	Argentinos Juniors	17	(0)
2009–2012	Alianza Lima	81	(7)
2012–2013	Juan Aurich	61	(4)
2013–2014	Douglas Haig	17	(0)
2015	Alianza Atlético		
2015	Atlético Torino	1	(0)
2016	Carlos A. Mannucci		
2017–	César Vallejo	111	(2)
- * Club domestic league appearances and goals as of 15:23, 20 April 2023 (UTC)

Leandro Fleitas (born 29 December 1983 in Moreno) is an Argentine football defender currently playing for César Vallejo.

Fleitas started his playing career with Argentinos in 2003, he joined Olimpo de Bahía Blanca for a successful spell for the 2006–2007 season, helping the club to win both the Apertura and Clausura tournaments to gain automatic promotion to the Argentine Primera.

Told that he was not going to be considered by new coach Claudio Vivas for the Clausura 2009 Tournament, Fleitas decided to move on loan to Alianza Lima.

== Titles ==
Season	Team	Title
Apertura 2006	Olimpo de Bahía Blanca	Primera B Nacional
Clausura 2007	Olimpo de Bahía Blanca	Primera B Nacional
