= Leandro Lázzaro =

Argentine footballer

Personal information
- Full name: Leandro Hernán Lázzaro Liuni
- Date of birth: 8 March 1974 (age 52)
- Place of birth: Buenos Aires, Argentina
- Height: 1.88 m (6 ft 2 in)
- Position: Striker

Senior career*
Years	Team	Apps	(Gls)
1994–1998	Nueva Chicago	79	(16)
1998–2001	FC Slovan Liberec	70	(30)
2001–2002	AC Sparta Prague	13	(4)
2002	Salernitana	19	(2)
2002–2003	Nocerina	28	(13)
2003	Ravenna Calcio	11	(0)
2004	Tivoli	15	(8)
2004–2006	Pro Sesto	47	(5)
2006–2007	Tigre	41	(18)
2008	Estudiantes	9	(3)
2008–2010	Tigre	72	(11)
2010–2011	Instituto	21	(5)
2012–2014	Deportivo Merlo	29	(5)
2014	San Lorenzo de Alem	9	(3)
- * Club domestic league appearances and goals

Leandro Lázzaro (born 8 March 1974) is an Argentine former footballer who played as a striker. From 2014, he is playing in Indoor Football.

== Career ==
Lázzaro started his career in 1994 with Nueva Chicago in the 2nd division of Argentine football. In 1998 Lázzaro moved to the Czech Republic to play for FC Slovan Liberec. He helped them win the Czech Cup in 1999–2000 and scored twice in the final. He then joined AC Sparta Prague in 2001.

In 2002 Lázzaro moved to Italy where he played in Serie B (Second Division) with Salernitana and in lower leagues with Nocerina, Ravenna Calcio, Tivoli and Pro Sesto before returning to Argentina in 2006 to join Tigre.

In his first season with Tigre he helped them to gain promotion to the Primera Division Argentina. He stayed with the club and become an important part of the squad playing their first season at the top level of Argentine football since 1980. Lázzaro finished the Apertura 2007 as the club's top scorer with 10 goals in 18 games, helping Tigre to finish in 2nd place, the best league finish in the club's history.

In January 2008 signed for Estudiantes for a fee of $300,000 but he returned to Tigre after only half a season with Estudiantes.

== Honours ==
Slovan Liberec

- Czech Cup: 1999–2000
