= Jhonnier González =

Colombian footballer (born 1982)

Jhonnier Gonzalez
Personal information
- Full name: Jhonnier González Córdoba
- Date of birth: 6 July 1982 (age 44)
- Place of birth: Turbo, Colombia
- Height: 1.84 m (6 ft 0 in)
- Position: Defender

Senior career*
Years	Team	Apps	(Gls)
2005–2006	Bajo Cauca	10	(1)
2006	Envigado	11	(2)
2007–2009	Santa Fe	14	(1)
2007	→ Colón de Santa Fe (loan)		
2009	Juventud Soacha		
2010–2011	Santa Fe	35	(1)
2011–2012	Atlético Huila	27	(1)
2012	Medellín	13	(0)
2013	León de Huánuco	17	(1)
2014	América de Cali	23	(0)

International career
2010	Colombia	1	(0)
2013	Equatorial Guinea	1	(0)
- * Club domestic league appearances and goals

Jhonnier González Córdoba (born 6 July 1982) is a former professional footballer who played as a defender. He was capped once each for the Colombia and Equatorial Guinea national teams.
