= Martín Cabrera =

Argentine footballer (born 1979)

Personal information
- Full name: Claudio Martín Cabrera
- Date of birth: August 8, 1979 (age 47)
- Place of birth: Río Cuarto, Argentina
- Height: 1.75 m (5 ft 9 in)
- Position: Right winger

Youth career
- Estudiantes RC

Senior career*
Years	Team	Apps	(Gls)
2001–2002	Estudiantes RC	0	(0)
2002–2005	CAI	99	(14)
2005	Quilmes	0	(0)
2006	Talleres	16	(7)
2006–2007	Olimpo	37	(12)
2007–2009	Argentinos Juniors	26	(2)
2009	→ Talleres (loan)	12	(1)
2009–2010	Olimpo	28	(1)
2010–2011	Aldosivi	34	(2)
2011–2012	Patronato	16	(0)
2012–2014	Deportivo Morón	34	(1)
2014	Atenas RC	12	(3)
2015	Estudiantes RC	21	(3)
2016	Racing de Córdoba	7	(0)
2017	Fénix de Pilar	2	(0)
2017	Atlético Ascasubi		
- * Club domestic league appearances and goals

Claudio Martín Cabrera (born 8 August 1979 in Río Cuarto, Córdoba) is a retired Argentine footballer, who played as a right winger.

== Career ==
Cabrera started his career in 2001 with his hometown club Estudiantes de Río Cuarto in the regionalised 3rd division. In 2002, he joined C.A.I. where he played until 2005.

In 2005 Cabrera joined Quilmes of the Argentine Primera, but he soon moved on to join Talleres de Córdoba.

In 2006 Cabrera joined Olimpo de Bahía Blanca where he was part of the squad that won the Apertura 2006 and the Clausura 2007 tournaments of Primera B Nacional to secure automatic promotion to the Primera. In 2007, he joined Argentinos Juniors, his only spell in the Argentine Primera División.

Subsequently, Cabrera played for Talleres (in the third division) and Olimpo, where he once again gained promotion to the first division. For the 2010–11 season, Cabrera joined second division side Aldosivi.

== Honours ==
Season	Team	Title
Apertura 2006	Olimpo de Bahía Blanca	Primera B Nacional
Clausura 2007	Olimpo de Bahía Blanca	Primera B Nacional

Nacional B 2009/2010 Olimpo de Bahía Blanca.
