= José Vizcarra (Argentine footballer) =

Argentine footballer (born 1984)

Personal information
- Full name: José Nicolás Vizcarra
- Date of birth: August 8, 1984 (age 42)
- Place of birth: Rosario, Argentina
- Height: 1.75 m (5 ft 9 in)
- Position: Forward

Team information
- Current team: Águila

Youth career
- –2006: Rosario Central

Senior career*
Years	Team	Apps	(Gls)
2006	→ Socio Águila FC (loan)	17	(7)
2006	→ Club Zacatepec (loan)	17	(2)
2007	→ LDU Quito (loan)	4	(0)
2006–2009	Rosario Central	62	(17)
2009–2012	Gimnasia de La Plata	49	(9)
2012	Deportivo Táchira	13	(3)
2013	Rangers de Talca	8	(1)
2013–2014	San Martín SJ	20	(5)
2014–2015	Boca Unidos	37	(12)
2015–2016	Ferro Carril Oeste	41	(6)
2016–2019	Platense	53	(14)
2019	Tristán Suárez	11	(0)
2019	Boca Unidos	10	(1)
2020–	Águila	11	(0)
- * Club domestic league appearances and goals as of 19:55, 24 May 2020 (UTC)

José Vizcarra (born 8 August 1984 in Rosario) is an Argentine football forward for C.D. Águila in El Salvador.

== Career ==
Vizcarra played for the Rosario Central youth team until 2006 when he was loaned to Socio Águila Fútbol Club and then Club Zacatepec in Mexico, in 2007 he was loaned to LDU Quito.

In 2007 Vizcarra returned to Central, although the team had a poor season, finishing last in the Apertura 2007.
