= Fernando Alloco =

Argentine footballer (born 1986)

Personal information
- Full name: Fernando Nicolás Alloco Romano
- Date of birth: 30 April 1986 (age 40)
- Place of birth: Paraná, Argentina
- Height: 1.85 m (6 ft 1 in)
- Position: Centre-back

Team information
- Current team: Colombia (assistant)

Youth career
- Colón

Senior career*
Years	Team	Apps	(Gls)
2004–2007	Colón	10	(0)
2007–2009	Defensa y Justicia	36	(2)
2009–2011	Independiente Rivadavia	20	(1)
2011–2012	Sport Boys	27	(2)
2012–2013	Real Garcilaso	43	(3)
2013–2015	Universitario	45	(2)
2015–2016	Asteras Tripolis	22	(0)
2016–2020	Boca Unidos	49	(0)

Managerial career
- 2021–2022: Melgar (assistant)
- 2022–: Colombia (assistant)
- * Club domestic league appearances and goals

Fernando Nicolás Alloco Romano (born April 30, 1986) is a retired Argentine footballer. He is currently the assistant manager of the Colombia national team.

== Club career ==
Alloco started his professional career in Argentina, where he played from 2004 to 2010 for Colón de Santa Fe, San Martín de San Juan, Defensa y Justicia and Independiente Rivadavia. Starting in 2011 he played in Peru for Sport Boys, Real Garcilaso and Universitario de Deportes.

After having irregular performances with Universitario de Deportes, with which he was champion of the Decentralized Tournament 2013, Alloco signed a contract in Europe with the Greek Super League side Asteras Tripolis, and started to play in the group stage of 2014-15 UEFA Europa League. The contract with Asteras Tripolis was for three years. Upon signing, he said, "Asteras Tripolis is my big chance. I really wanted to play in Europe, especially in a club with European standards. I saw the club matches for Europa League. I saw the game against Tottenham in London. I can not wait to join the team and be aware of all my teammates."

== Coaching career ==
After retiring in 2020, Alloco was appointed assistant coach of Néstor Lorenzo at Melgar ahead of the 2021 season. In July 2022, Néstor Lorenzo was appointed manager of the Colombia national team, with Alloco as his assistant again.

== Honours ==
=== Club ===
Universitario de Deportes

- Torneo Descentralizado (1): 2013
