= Patricio Abraham =

Argentine footballer

Personal information
- Full name: Patricio Alejandro Abraham
- Date of birth: 19 March 1982 (age 44)
- Place of birth: Rosario, Argentina
- Height: 1.94 m (6 ft 4 in)
- Position: Goalkeeper

Senior career*
Years	Team	Apps	(Gls)
2004–2006	Douglas Haig	37	(0)
2006–2007	Tigre	8	(0)
2007–2008	Platense	9	(0)
2008–2009	San Telmo	29	(1)
2009–2011	Sarmiento de Junín	50	(0)
2011–2012	Almagro	10	(0)
2012–2013	San Telmo	32	(0)
2013–2014	Sportivo Las Parejas	17	(0)
2014–2015	Coquimbo Unido	37	(0)
2016–2017	Sarmiento de Leones	16	(0)
2018–2019	Juventud de Pergamino	20	(0)
Total		265	(1)
- * Club domestic league appearances and goals

Patricio Alejandro Abraham (born 19 March 1982) is an Argentine former footballer who played as a goalkeeper.

He played for Chilean side Coquimbo Unido.
