= Sebastián Arrieta =

Argentine footballer (born 1985)

Personal information
- Full name: Sebastián Alejandro Arrieta
- Date of birth: October 21, 1985 (age 41)
- Place of birth: Añatuya, Argentina
- Height: 1.78 m (5 ft 10 in)
- Positions: Midfielder; forward

Team information
- Current team: Instituto

Youth career
- 2003: Instituto

Senior career*
Years	Team	Apps	(Gls)
2003–2006	Instituto	40	(4)
2006–2007	Newell's Old Boys	26	(3)
2007–2008	Racing Club	13	(0)
2009	Unión de Santa Fe	7	(0)
2010	Atlético Rafaela		
2010–	Instituto		
- * Club domestic league appearances and goals as of 05:13, 23 September 2010 (UTC)

Sebastián Alejandro Arrieta (born 21 October 1985 in Añatuya, Santiago del Estero Province) is an Argentine footballer currently playing for Instituto.
