= Sebastián Malandra =

Argentine footballer

Personal information
- Full name: Sebastián Marcelo Malandra
- Date of birth: 31 January 1985 (age 41)
- Place of birth: Piamonte, Santa Fe, Argentina
- Height: 1.78 m (5 ft 10 in)
- Position: Midfielder

Youth career
- Piamonte
- 1998–2004: Colón

Senior career*
Years	Team	Apps	(Gls)
2004–2009	Colón	20	(1)
2007	→ San Martín SJ (loan)	5	(0)
2007	→ Atlético Rafaela (loan)	0	(0)
2008	→ Ben Hur (loan)	16	(0)
2008–2009	→ Olimpo (loan)	10	(1)
2010	Ñublense	7	(1)
2011	Curicó Unido	11	(1)
2011	Perugia	0	(0)
2012	Sportivo Belgrano	19	(3)
2012–2013	Desamparados	20	(0)
2013	Huracán	0	(0)
2013	Ragusa	–	(–)
2014	Palmese	–	(–)
2014	Huracán San Rafael	–	(–)
2015	Sarmiento de Resistencia	22	(0)
2016–2017	Sportivo Italiano	20	(0)
2017	Deportivo Madryn	0	(0)
2017–2018	Excursionistas	33	(3)
2018–2019	Arbus	–	(–)
2019–2020	Castiadas	–	(–)
2020–2021	Arbus	–	(–)
2021	Piamonte	–	(–)
- * Club domestic league appearances and goals

Sebastián Marcelo Malandra (born 31 January 1985) is a former Argentine footballer.

== Career ==
Born in Piamonte, San Martín Department, Santa Fe, Malandra began playing youth football with local side Club Atlético Piamonte before joining Colón, aged 13. He would make his Primera División Argentina debut with Colón. A brief spell with Primera side San Martín de San Juan followed, before Malandra dropped down to play for second division clubs (Atlético Rafaela, Ben Hur and Olimpo) and then a pair of Chilean sides (Ñublense and Curicó Unido). Malandra returned from abroad after playing for Perugia and joined a series of lower division clubs (Sportivo Belgrano, Desamparados, Huracán, Sarmiento de Resistencia, Huracán San Rafael, Sportivo Italiano, Deportivo Madryn, Excursionistas, and Piamonte).

Besides Perugia, he also played for Ragusa, Palmese, Arbus Calcio and Castiadas in Italy.

He ended his career with Piamonte in his hometown.
