= Martín Troncoso =

Argentine footballer

Personal information
- Date of birth: 31 January 1986 (age 40)
- Place of birth: Maciá, Argentina
- Height: 1.90 m (6 ft 3 in)
- Position: Forward

Youth career
- Colón

Senior career*
Years	Team	Apps	(Gls)
2007	Colón	1	(0)
2008	Defensa y Justicia	3	(0)
2008–2009	9 de Julio	13	(2)
2010	ESPOLI	1	(0)
2011–2015	Villa San Carlos	33	(10)
2014	Iberia	22	(4)
2018	Independiente Bolívar	–	(–)
2019	Villa San Carlos	11	(0)
2019	Everton LP	–	(–)
- * Club domestic league appearances and goals

Martín Troncoso (born 31 January 1986) is an Argentine former professional footballer who played as a forward.

== Teams ==
- (Argentina) Colón de Santa Fe 2007
- (Argentina) Defensa y Justicia 2008
- (Argentina) 9 de Julio de Rafaela 2008–2009
- (Ecuador) Espoli 2010
- (Argentina) Villa San Carlos 2011–2014
- (Chile) Iberia 2014–2015
- (Argentina) Independiente Bolívar
- (Argentina) Villa San Carlos 2019
- (Argentina) Everton La Plata 2019
