= Juan Sabia =

Argentine footballer

Personal information
- Full name: Juan Alberto Sabia
- Date of birth: 17 December 1981 (age 44)
- Place of birth: Pergamino, Argentina
- Height: 1.80 m (5 ft 11 in)
- Position: Centre-back

Team information
- Current team: Libertad

Youth career
- Racing Club de Pergamino

Senior career*
Years	Team	Apps	(Gls)
2000–2006	Ben Hur	87	(2)
2006–2007	Gimnasia de Jujuy	21	(0)
2007–2012	Argentinos Juniors	151	(3)
2013–2014	Vélez Sársfield	20	(0)
2014–2017	Argentinos Juniors	12	(0)
2017–	Libertad	11	(0)
- * Club domestic league appearances and goals as of 22:00, 14 November 2017 (UTC)

Juan Alberto Sabia (born 17 December 1981) is an Argentine professional footballer who plays as a centre-back for Torneo Federal A side Libertad.

== Career ==
Sabia started his professional career in 2000 playing for Ben Hur in the Torneo Argentino A. In 2005, he won the Torneo Argentino A with the club and therefore won promotion to the Primera B Nacional (second division). The defender played one season with Ben Hur in the Primera B Nacional and then joined Gimnasia y Esgrima de Jujuy in the Argentine Primera División in 2006. After one season with Gimnasia, Sabia joined Argentinos Juniors in 2007.

Sabia quickly established himself as a regular starter for Argentinos Juniors and in 2010 helped the team obtain the 2010 Clausura championship, the club's first top-flight honour in 25 years. The defender played in 14 of the club's 19 games during their championship winning campaign, scoring one goal in the penultimate fixture win against Independiente.

In 2013, Sabia joined Vélez Sársfield on a free transfer, signing for a year and a half.

== Honours ==
Ben Hur

- Torneo Argentino A (1): 2004–05

Argentinos Juniors

- Argentine Primera División (1): 2010 Clausura

Vélez Sarsfield

- Supercopa Argentina (1): 2013
