= Jeremías Caggiano =

Argentine footballer (born 1983)

Personal information
- Full name: Jeremías Emanuel Caggiano
- Date of birth: March 15, 1983 (age 43)
- Place of birth: Mar del Plata, Argentina
- Height: 1.82 m (6 ft 0 in)
- Position: Striker

Senior career*
| Years | Team | Apps | (Gls) |
| 2002–2004 | Independiente | 28 | (5) |
| 2004–2005 | Huracán TA | 35 | (16) |
| 2005 | Guingamp | 6 | (4) |
| 2005–2006 | Independiente | 8 | (1) |
| 2006–2008 | Guingamp | 32 | (11) |
| 2007 | → Estudiantes LP (loan) | 3 | (0) |
| 2008 | Albacete | 2 | (0) |
| 2008–2009 | Universidad Católica | 20 | (3) |
| 2009 | Gimnasia de Jujuy | 29 | (3) |
| 2010 | Macará | 11 | (2) |
| 2011 | Sport Boys | 21 | (1) |
| 2012 | Londrina | 0 | (0) |
| 2012–2013 | Deportivo Anzoátegui | 24 | (4) |
| 2013–2014 | Brown de Adrogué | 25 | (2) |
| 2014–2015 | Deportivo Español | 16 | (0) |
| 2015–2016 | Camioneros | 16 | (3) |
| 2016–2017 | Berazategui | 26 | (2) |
| Total | | 302 | (57) |
- * Club domestic league appearances and goals

Jeremías Emanuel Caggiano (born March 15, 1983) is an Argentine former football striker.

== Career ==
Born in Mar del Plata, Caggiano started his career in 2002 with Club Atlético Independiente of the Primera Division Argentina. In 2004, he moved to newly promoted Huracán de Tres Arroyos he scored plenty of goals for the club, but they couldn't avoid relegation at the end of the 2004–2005 season.

his goalscoring bought him to the attention of In the 2006–2007 season he played for Guingamp in Ligue 2 who signed him in 2005. He returned to Independiente for the Apertura 2005 tournament and then went back to France for the resumation of the league in January 2006. In the summer of 2007 it was unearthed he was homesick, although his form for Guingamp did not appear to suffer he was allowed to return to Argentina to play for Estudiantes de La Plata on loan.

In July 2008, it was confirmed that Caggiano had signed for the Chilean team Universidad Católica. Caggiano knows that he hasn't scored an official goal with any team in 3 years. Despite this, Universidad Católica has faith in him that his goal scoring ability will come back and help the club in winning a championship. After 2009 Apertura tournament Universidad Católica doesn't renew his contract, he moved to Gimnasia y Esgrima de Jujuy.

== Post-retirement ==
Caggiano became a football agent alongside his friend Walter Montillo, whom he met in Chile.

He has played for Independiente Senior, a team made up by former players of Independiente.
