= Bernardo Leyenda =

Argentine footballer

Personal information
- Full name: Bernardo Alejandro Leyenda
- Date of birth: March 26, 1980 (age 46)
- Place of birth: Buenos Aires, Argentina
- Height: 1.78 m (5 ft 10 in)
- Position: Goalkeeper

Senior career*
Years	Team	Apps	(Gls)
1999–2003	Vélez Sársfield	46	(0)
2003–2004	Leganés	16	(0)
2004–2005	Banfield	17	(0)
2005–2006	Independiente	10	(0)
2006–2007	River Plate	0	(0)
2008	Racing Club	0	(0)
2008–2009	San Martín de Tucumán	0	(0)
2009–2010	Defensa y Justicia	19	(0)
2011	Nacional Potosí	21	(0)
2011–2013	All Boys	3	(0)
- * Club domestic league appearances and goals

Bernardo Alejandro Leyenda (born 26 March 1980 in Buenos Aires) is a former Argentine goalkeeper.

He played for River Plate of the Primera Division Argentina in 2006/2008, but never played any games. In January 2008, he was transferred to Racing but he also failed to make an appearance for La Academia. Leyenda has kept goal for Vélez Sársfield, Banfield and Independiente as well as Leganés in the Spanish Segunda División.
