= Pablo Bangardino =

Argentine footballer

Personal information
- Full name: Pablo Martín Bangardino
- Date of birth: January 9, 1987 (age 39)
- Place of birth: La Plata, Argentina
- Height: 1.78 m (5 ft 10 in)
- Position: Goalkeeper

Team information
- Current team: Villa San Carlos

Youth career
- Gimnasia LP

Senior career*
Years	Team	Apps	(Gls)
2007–2014	Gimnasia LP	15	(0)
2007–2008	→ Central Español (loan)	10	(0)
2010–2011	→ Gimnasia de Jujuy (loan)	38	(0)
2014–2015	Sarmiento	2	(0)
2016	Guillermo Brown	10	(0)
2017–	Villa San Carlos	52	(0)
- * Club domestic league appearances and goals as of 3 May 2018

Pablo Martín Bangardino (born 9 January 1985), is a football goalkeeper. He currently plays for Villa San Carlos.

== Career ==
Bangardino started his career with Gimnasia y Esgrima de La Plata. He played loaned during 2007 in Uruguayan Central Español, and played his first 9 games with Gimnasia La Plata when he returned from the loan. In 2010, he was loaned again, this time to second division Gimnasia y Esgrima de Jujuy.
