= Marcos Gutiérrez =

Argentine footballer

Personal information
- Full name: Marcos Juan Gutiérrez
- Date of birth: 30 November 1970 (age 55)
- Place of birth: Ledesma, Argentina
- Height: 1.82 m (5 ft 11 1/2 in)
- Position: Goalkeeper

Youth career
- Atlético Ledesma

Senior career*
Years	Team	Apps	(Gls)
1990–1991	Atlético Ledesma	–	(–)
1991–1999	Huracán	158	(0)
1997–1998	→ Toros Neza (loan)	34	(0)
1999–2000	Necaxa	0	(0)
2000–2001	San Martín Tucumán	21	(0)
2002–2004	Talleres	36	(0)
2004–2005	Argentinos Juniors	40	(0)
2005–2008	Newell's Old Boys	15	(0)
2006–2007	→ Olimpo (loan)	36	(0)
2008–2011	San Martín Tucumán	63	(0)
2011	Deportes La Serena	28	(0)
2012–2013	San Jorge	–	(–)
Total		431	(0)

Managerial career
- 2016–2017: Sportivo Rivadavia
- * Club domestic league appearances and goals

Marcos Juan Gutiérrez (born 30 November 1970) is a former Argentine football goalkeeper who played for club in Argentina, Mexico and Chile.

== Career ==
Gutiérrez stood out as a goalkeeper for Huracán in the 90s.

One of his milestones in Chilean football was to save a penalty to Esteban Paredes, Primera División de Chile all–time top scorer. Likewise, in the same game, his team, Deportes La Serena, achieved a historic 4–0 victory over Chilean giants Colo-Colo.

== Personal life ==
Gutiérrez is better known by his nickname Anguila (Eel).

He was in a love relationship with the renowned actress Graciela Borges for about three years at the end of the 90s.
