= Leandro Díaz (footballer, born 1986) =

Argentine footballer

Personal information
- Full name: Leandro Javier Díaz Borzani
- Date of birth: June 26, 1986 (age 40)
- Place of birth: Buenos Aires, Argentina
- Height: 1.81 m (5 ft 11 in)
- Position: Midfielder

Team information
- Current team: Independiente (assistant)

Youth career
- 2004–2005: Boca Juniors

Senior career*
Years	Team	Apps	(Gls)
2005–2007	Boca Juniors	1	(0)
2005	→ Ciudad de Murcia	0	(0)
2006–2007	→ Villarreal	0	(0)
2007–2010	Huracán	77	(4)
2010–2011	Universidad Católica	5	(0)
2011–2014	Quilmes	79	(3)
2014–2015	Once Caldas	2	(0)
2016–2017	Huracán	2	(0)
2018–2019	Tristán Suárez	2	(0)

Managerial career
- 2020–2021: Colón (assistant)
- 2022–: Independiente (assistant)
- * Club domestic league appearances and goals

Leandro Javier Díaz Borzani (Spanish pronunciation: [leˈandɾo xaˈβjeɾ ˈðiaθ], born 26 June 1986) is a retired Argentine footballer who played as a midfielder.

== Club career ==
Díaz played for the youth teams of Boca Juniors from 2004 and in 2005 he spent time in Spain with Ciudad de Murcia and Villarreal. He returned to Boca Juniors in 2006.

In 2007, he joined Huracán on a one-year loan. At the beginning of the 2008–09 season his loan was renewed. On October 5, 2008, he scored a bicycle kick to give Huracán a victory over Independiente.

== Coaching career ==
In March 2020, Díaz was appointed assistant coach of newly appointed Colón manager Eduardo Domínguez. Domínguez and his staff, including Díaz, left Colón at the end of 2021. In January 2022, he once again became the assistant of Eduardo Domínguez, this time at Independiente.

== Honours ==
=== Club ===
Boca Juniors

- Argentine Primera División (1): 2006 Clausura
- Recopa Sudamericana (1): 2006
- Copa Libertadores (1): 2007

Universidad Católica

- Primera División de Chile (1): 2010
