= Roberto Salvatierra =

Argentine footballer

Personal information
- Full name: Roberto Hernán Salvatierra
- Date of birth: October 28, 1984 (age 42)
- Place of birth: Bolívar, Argentina
- Height: 1.76 m (5 ft 9 in)
- Position: Right winger

Team information
- Current team: Ferro Carril Oeste

Senior career*
Years	Team	Apps	(Gls)
2005–2007 2007–2008	Club Atlético Banfield	34	(1)
2008–2009	Gimnasia L.P.	24	(3)
2009–2010	Olimpo	22	(0)
2010–	Sportivo Italiano	18	(0)
	Ferro Carril Oeste	6	(0)
- * Club domestic league appearances and goals as of 22:23, 23 September 2010 (UTC)

Roberto Hernán Salvatierra (born October 28, 1984, in Bolívar) is an Argentine footballer who plays as a midfielder. He currently plays for Ferro Carril Oeste
