= Gonzalo de Porras =

Argentine footballer

Personal information
- Full name: Gonzalo Martín de Porras
- Date of birth: 26 July 1984 (age 42)
- Place of birth: Cutral Có, Neuquén, Argentina
- Height: 1.80 m (5 ft 11 in)
- Position: Striker

Youth career
- Rosario Central

Senior career*
Years	Team	Apps	(Gls)
2003–2008	Rosario Central	7	(1)
2005–2006	→ Borjomi (loan)	14	(6)
2007	→ Olympiakos Nicosia (loan)	5	(1)
2008	Olmedo	14	(6)
2009	Manfredonia	5	(0)
2010	Molfetta	–	(–)
2011	Coquimbo Unido	32	(9)
2012	Cobresal	16	(4)
2012	Coquimbo Unido	8	(4)
2013	Deportes Concepción	8	(3)
2013–2015	Barnechea	51	(11)
2015–2016	Deportes Temuco	4	(0)
2016	Tiro Federal	–	(–)
2017	Barraca de Armstrong	–	(–)
Total		164	(45)
- * Club domestic league appearances and goals

Gonzalo Martín de Porras (born 26 July 1984) is a former Argentine footballer who played as a striker.

== Career ==
Born in Cutral Có, Neuquén Province, Argentine, de Porras is a product of Rosario Central, with whom he made his debut in 2005 and was loaned out to Georgian club Borjomi and the Cypriot club Olympiakos Nicosia in 2005 and 2006, respectively.

After ending his contract with Rosario Central in 2008, he moved abroad again and played for Olmedo in Ecuador and both Manfredonia and Molfetta in Italy.

In 2011, de Porras came to Chile and played for Coquimbo Unido, Cobresal, Deportes Concepción, Barnechea and Deportes Temuco until 2016.

Back in Argentina, de Porras played for Tiro Federal in 2016 and Barraca de Armstrong in 2017.
