= Omar Labruna =

Argentine footballer and coach (born 1957)

Personal information
- Full name: Omar Raúl Labruna
- Date of birth: 3 April 1957 (age 69)
- Place of birth: Buenos Aires, Argentina
- Height: 1.78 m (5 ft 10 in)
- Position: Left-back

Youth career
- 1971–1975: River Plate

Senior career*
Years	Team	Apps	(Gls)
1976–1981	River Plate	45	(1)
1981	Quilmes	18	(0)
1982	Platense	23	(4)
1983	Deportivo Italiano	8	(0)

Managerial career
- 2003: Belgrano
- 2004: Huracán (TA)
- 2005–2006: Olimpo
- 2006–2007: Deportivo Cali
- 2008–2009: Gimnasia de Jujuy
- 2009: Belgrano
- 2010: Aldosivi
- 2010–2012: Audax Italiano
- 2012–2013: Colo-Colo
- 2013–2014: Everton
- 2014–2015: Nueva Chicago
- 2015–2016: Gimnasia de Mendoza
- 2016: Boca Unidos
- 2016: Platense
- 2020: Nueva Chicago
- * Club domestic league appearances and goals

Omar Raúl Labruna (Spanish pronunciation: [oˈmaɾ laˈβruna], born 3 April 1957) is an Argentine football former coach and former professional player. He is the son of the historic River Plate player Ángel Labruna.

== Club career ==
"Omarcito" Labruna started his playing career at River Plate in 1976 during his father Ángel's time as manager of the club. He left River in 1981 and had spells with Quilmes, Platense and Deportivo Italiano.

== Coaching career ==
Labruna spent several years working in coaching and as an assistant manager before becoming the manager of Belgrano de Córdoba in 2003. He then joined Huracán de Tres Arroyos and led the small provincial team to 2nd place in the Primera B Nacional in the Clausura 2004 championship

In 2005, he became the manager of Olimpo de Bahía Blanca in the Primera División Argentina and in 2006 he was appointed as the manager of Colombian side Deportivo Cali. In 2008, he took over as manager of Gimnasia y Esgrima de Jujuy and was fired on 11 March 2009.

In March 2009, Labruna returned to Belgrano de Córdoba of the 2nd division.

From 2010 to 2014, he worked in Chile as the manager of Audax Italiano, Colo-Colo and Everton.

In 2020, Labruna assumed as head coach of Nueva Chicago by second time. He could only lead one match due to COVID-19 pandemic.

== Honours ==
River Plate

- Primera División: Metropolitano 1977, Nacional 1979, Metropolitano 1979, Metropolitano 1980
