= Leonel Ríos =

Argentine footballer (born 1983)

Personal information
- Full name: Leonel Ríos
- Date of birth: November 17, 1982 (age 43)
- Place of birth: Buenos Aires, Argentina
- Height: 1.78 m (5 ft 10 in)
- Position: Right midfielder

Youth career
- Independiente

Senior career*
Years	Team	Apps	(Gls)
2001–2004	Independiente	85	(6)
2004	UD Almería	10	(0)
2005–2006	Arsenal de Sarandí	23	(1)
2006	Reggina	6	(0)
2007	Rosario Central	17	(0)
2007–2008	Vélez Sársfield	28	(4)
2008–2009	Independiente	26	(3)
2009–2011	Asteras Tripolis	17	(0)
2011	Kavala	10	(1)
2011–2012	Olimpo	9	(0)
2012–2013	Godoy Cruz	7	(0)
2013–2014	Brown de Adrogué	16	(0)
2014–2015	Boyacá Chicó	14	(1)
2015	Brown de Adrogué	5	(0)
2015–2016	Atlético Venezuela	29	(7)
2016–2018	Boca Unidos	21	(0)
2019	Porvenir San Clemente	11	(1)
2019	Fénix de Pilar	6	(0)
2020	Ciudad de Bolívar	6	(0)
2016–2017	Círculo Deportivo	5	(0)
2021	Huracán Las Heras	6	(0)
- * Club domestic league appearances and goals

Leonel Ríos (born 17 November 1983 in Buenos Aires) is a retired Argentine football midfielder.

Ríos began his career at Independiente in 2001, in 2004 he moved to Spain to play for UD Almería but returned to Argentina shortly afterward to play for Arsenal de Sarandí. In 2006, he was signed by Italian Serie B side Genoa, who loaned him to Serie A club Reggina Calcio. However, Ríos failed to gain a place in the team and on January 31, 2007, he was signed by Rosario Central.

Ríos signed for Vélez Sársfield for the start of the 2007–08 season. He subsequently returned to Independiente for the Apertura 2008 tournament. In the summer of 2009 he went back to Europe this time for Asteras Tripolis on the Greek Super League.

He signed a six-month contract with Kavala F.C. in 2011. After the 6 months, Kavala did not re-sign the player, making him a free agent.

Ríos returned to Argentina following his contract had expired and on 14 July 2011 joined Olimpo de Bahía Blanca on free transfer.

The highlight of Ríos' career so far was being part of the Independiente squad that won the Apertura tournament in 2002. He has also appeared over 200 times for "El Rojo".

Season	Club	Titles
2002	Independiente	Primera Division Argentina Apertura
