= César Carranza =

Argentine footballer

Personal information
- Full name: César Alberto Carranza
- Date of birth: 16 August 1980 (age 46)
- Place of birth: Buenos Aires, Argentina
- Height: 1.60 m (5 ft 3 in)
- Position: Forward

Senior career*
Years	Team	Apps	(Gls)
2001–2007	Nueva Chicago	98	(13)
2005	→ Real Colima (loan)	21	(11)
2005	→ Querétaro FC (loan)	14	(3)
2007–2008	Gimnasia de Jujuy	49	(15)
2009–2010	Colo Colo	16	(4)
2009	→ Everton (loan)	19	(4)
2010	→ Godoy Cruz (loan)	34	(5)
2011	Lanús	31	(3)
2012–2013	Belgrano	25	(3)
2013–2014	Ferro Carril Oeste	30	(4)
2014–2015	Aldosivi	32	(6)
2015–2016	Gimnasia Mendoza	32	(9)
2016–2017	Barracas Central	27	(2)
2017–2019	San Telmo	52	(4)
2019	Ituzaingó	17	(3)
2020–2012	Argentino de Merlo	12	(1)
2021	San Telmo	5	(0)
Total		514	(90)
- * Club domestic league appearances and goals

César Alberto Carranza (born 16 August 1980) is a retired Argentine footballer, who played as a forward.

== Career ==
Carranza started his professional career in 2001 with Nueva Chicago. In 2005, he spent time on loan to Mexican clubs Real Colima and Querétaro FC. He joined Gimnasia y Esgrima de Jujuy in 2007.

In late 2008 he was acquired by Colo Colo, defending Chilean Champion. In June 2009 he was loaned to Everton de Viña del Mar and in January 2010 he was again loaned, this time to Godoy Cruz in Argentina.
