= Sebastián Carrera =

Argentine footballer (born 1978)

Personal information
- Full name: Sebastián Carrera
- Date of birth: May 25, 1978 (age 48)
- Place of birth: Buenos Aires, Argentina
- Height: 1.69 m (5 ft 7 in)
- Position: Midfielder

Team information
- Current team: Douglas Haig

Senior career*
Years	Team	Apps	(Gls)
1997–1999	Dock Sud	38	(1)
2000–2001	Los Andes	7	(0)
2001–2004	Almagro	108	(18)
2004–2006	Real Murcia	65	(5)
2006–2007	Argentinos Juniors	34	(5)
2007–2009	Arsenal de Sarandí	54	(3)
2009–2011	Asteras Tripolis	47	(3)
2011–2013	Atlético de Rafaela	59	(6)
2013–2014	Belgrano	19	(1)
2014–	Douglas Haig	24	(2)
- * Club domestic league appearances and goals as of 29 March 2015

Sebastián Carrera (born 25 May 1978 in Buenos Aires, Argentina) is an Argentine footballer. He currently plays as a midfielder for Douglas Haig of the Argentine Primera B Nacional.

== Career ==
Carrera started his career in the lower leagues of Argentine football with Dock Sud in 1997. He got his first chance to play in the Argentine Primera in 2000 when he joined Los Andes, but he dropped a division in 2001 to join Almagro. In 2004 Carrera moved to Spain to play for Real Murcia, he played 65 league games for the club, scoring 5 goals. In 2006 Carrera returned to Argentina, he played one season with Argentinos Juniors before joining Arsenal de Sarandí in 2007. In 2011 we joined Atlético de Rafaela to play in Primera División.

== Titles ==
Season	Club	Title
2007	Arsenal de Sarandí	Copa Sudamericana
