= 2001–02 in Argentine football =

Football in Argentina
- Season: 2001–02

== Torneo Apertura ("Opening" Tournament) ==
Position	Team	Points	Played	Won	Drawn	Lost	For	Against	Difference
1	Racing Club	42	19	12	6	1	34	17	17
2	River Plate	41	19	12	5	2	51	16	35
3	Boca Juniors	33	19	9	6	4	41	27	14
4	Colón de Santa Fe	32	19	8	8	3	24	16	8
5	San Lorenzo	31	19	8	7	4	28	22	6
6	Estudiantes La Plata	27	19	7	6	6	27	28	-1
7	Gimnasia La Plata	27	19	7	6	6	30	35	-5
8	Chacarita Juniors	26	19	6	8	5	28	24	4
9	Belgrano de Córdoba	26	19	6	8	5	17	18	-1
10	Independiente	26	19	7	5	7	26	28	-2
11	Argentinos Juniors	25	19	7	4	8	22	27	-5
12	Lanús	25	19	7	4	8	21	28	-7
13	Nueva Chicago	24	19	7	3	9	26	33	-7
14	Newell's Old Boys	23	19	6	5	8	29	28	1
15	Vélez Sársfield	22	19	5	7	7	27	30	-3
16	Rosario Central	20	19	5	5	9	18	26	-8
17	Unión de Santa Fe	18	19	3	9	7	23	25	-2
18	Banfield	18	19	4	6	9	16	24	-8
19	Huracán	14	19	3	5	11	22	39	-17
20	Talleres de Córdoba	13	19	4	1	14	18	37	-19

=== Top scorers ===
Position	Player	Team	Goals
1	Martín Cardetti	River Plate	17
2	Diego Forlán	Independiente	12
3	Facundo Sava	Gimnasia La Plata	11
4	Ernesto Farías	Estudiantes La Plata	10

=== Relegation ===
There is no relegation after the Apertura. For the relegation results of this tournament see below

== Torneo Clausura ("Closing" Tournament) ==
Position	Team	Points	Played	Won	Drawn	Lost	For	Against	Difference
1	River Plate	43	19	13	4	2	39	13	26
2	Gimnasia La Plata	37	19	11	4	4	33	23	10
3	Boca Juniors	35	19	10	5	4	25	17	8
4	Huracán	30	19	9	3	7	27	14	13
5	Banfield	30	19	8	6	5	21	19	2
6	Racing Club	29	19	8	5	6	19	17	2
7	Newell's Old Boys	28	19	8	4	7	26	25	1
8	Estudiantes La Plata	27	19	7	6	6	34	27	7
9	Vélez Sársfield	26	19	7	5	7	27	20	7
10	Lanús	26	19	6	8	5	20	18	2
11	San Lorenzo	26	19	6	8	5	24	23	1
12	Colón de Santa Fe	24	19	6	6	7	24	23	1
13	Nueva Chicago	24	19	6	6	7	16	21	-5
14	Chacarita Juniors	21	19	4	9	7	23	24	-1
15	Unión de Santa Fe	21	19	5	6	8	20	27	-7
16	Rosario Central	20	19	5	5	9	20	26	-6
17	Argentinos Juniors	20	19	5	5	9	20	32	-12
18	Belgrano de Córdoba	18	19	5	3	11	16	24	-8
19	Talleres de Córdoba	17	19	5	2	12	14	31	-17
20	Independiente	15	19	3	6	10	14	28	-14

=== Top scorers ===
Position	Player	Team	Goals
1	Fernando Cavenaghi	River Plate	15
2	Facundo Sava	Gimnasia La Plata	12
3	Ernesto Farías	Estudiantes La Plata	11
3	Josemir Lujambio	Banfield	11
3	Daniel Montenegro	Huracán	11

=== Relegation ===
Team	Average	Points	Played	1999-00	2000-01	2001-02
River Plate	2.175	248	114	86	78	84
Boca Juniors	1.877	214	114	74	71	68
San Lorenzo	1.815	207	114	69	81	57
Gimnasia de La Plata	1.473	168	114	49	55	64
Vélez Sársfield	1.447	165	114	61	56	48
Colón de Santa Fe	1.421	162	114	55	49	56
Racing Club	1.368	156	114	45	40	71
Newell's Old Boys	1.350	154	114	55	48	51
Estudiantes La Plata	1.307	149	114	39	56	54
Talleres de Córdoba	1.307	149	114	58	61	30
Huracán	1.303	99	76	N/A	55	44
Chacarita Juniors	1.298	148	114	45	56	47
Rosario Central	1.289	147	114	66	41	40
Banfield	1.263	96	76	N/A	N/A	48
Independiente	1.263	144	114	61	42	41
Nueva Chicago	1.263	48	38	N/A	N/A	48
Lanús	1.245	142	114	48	43	51
Unión de Santa Fe	1.184	135	114	50	46	38
Argentinos Juniors	1.114	127	114	39	43	45
Belgrano de Córdoba	1.052	120	114	39	37	41

==== "Promoción" Playoff ====
Date	Home	Away	Result
May 23, 2002	Huracán de Tres Arroyos	Lanús	1-2
May 26, 2002	Lanús	Huracán de Tres Arroyos	1-1

Lanús wins 3-2 and stays in Argentine First Division. Huracán de Tres Arroyos remains in Argentine Nacional B.

Date	Home	Away	Result
May 23, 2002	Gimnasia (CdU)	Unión de Santa Fe	3-1
May 26, 2002	Unión de Santa Fe	Gimnasia (CdU)	3-0

Unión de Santa Fe wins 4-3 and stays in Argentine First Division. Gimnasia (CdU) remains in Argentine Nacional B.

== Lower leagues ==
Level	Tournament	Champion
2nd	Primera B Nacional	Olimpo
3rd	Primera B Metropolitana	Deportivo Español
3rd (Interior)	Torneo Argentino A	C.A.I
4th	Primera C Metropolitana	Deportivo Laferrere
5th	Primera D Metropolitana	Villa San Carlos

== Argentine clubs in international competitions ==
Team	Intercontinental	2001 Copa Mercosur	2002 Copa Libertadores
San Lorenzo	N/A	Champions	Group stage
Boca Juniors	Runners up	Group stage	QF
Talleres	N/A	QF	Group stage
Independiente	N/A	QF	did not qualify
River Plate	N/A	Group stage	2nd round
Vélez Sársfield	N/A	Group stage	Group stage

== National team ==
This section covers Argentina's matches from August 1, 2001 to July 31, 2002.

Win Draw Loss

=== Friendly matches ===
February 13, 2002	Wales	1 – 1	Argentina	Cardiff, Wales
	Bellamy 34'	(Report)	Cruz 61'	Stadium: Millennium Stadium; Attendance: 65,000

March 27, 2002	Cameroon	2 – 2	Argentina	Geneva, Switzerland
	Eto'o 21'; Suffo 86'	(Report)	Verón 17' (pen.); Aimar 63'	Stadium: Charmilles Stadium; Attendance: 7,660; Referee: Urs Meier (Switzerland)

April 17, 2002	Germany	0 – 1	Argentina	Stuttgart, Germany
		(Report)	Sorín 47'	Stadium: Gottlieb-Daimler-Stadion; Attendance: 54,570

=== 2002 World Cup qualifiers ===
August 15, 2001 Round 14	Ecuador	0 – 2	Argentina	Quito, Ecuador
16:00 UTC-05		(Report)	Verón 19'; Crespo 34' (pen.)	Stadium: Estadio Olímpico Atahualpa; Attendance: 38,156; Referee: Stefano Braschi (Italy)

September 5, 2001 Round 15	Argentina	2 – 1	Brazil	Buenos Aires, Argentina
20:00 UTC-03	Gallardo 76'; Cris 84' (o.g.)	(Report)	Ayala 2' (o.g.)	Stadium: Estadio Antonio V. Liberti; Attendance: 51,000; Referee: Urs Meier (Switzerland)

October 7, 2001 Round 16	Paraguay	2 – 2	Argentina	Asunción, Paraguay
18:15 UTC-03	Chilavert 51' (pen); Morinigo 70'	(Report)	Pochettino 67'; Batistuta 73'	Stadium: Estadio Defensores del Chaco; Attendance: 45,000; Referee: Gilberto Hidalgo (Peru)

November 8, 2001 Round 17	Argentina	2 – 0	Peru	Buenos Aires, Argentina
18:00 UTC-03	Samuel 46'; López 84'	(Report)		Stadium: Estadio Antonio V. Liberti; Attendance: 18,901; Referee: Jorge Larrionda (Uruguay)

November 14, 2001 Round 18	Uruguay	1 – 1	Argentina	Montevideo, Uruguay
20:40 UTC-03	Silva 19'	(Report)	López 44'	Stadium: Estadio Centenario; Attendance: 48,100; Referee: Markus Merk (Germany)

=== 2002 World Cup ===
June 2, 2002 Group stage	Argentina	1 – 0	Nigeria	Ibaraki, Japan
14:30 UTC+9	Batistuta 63'	(Report)		Stadium: Kashima Soccer Stadium; Attendance: 34,050; Referee: Gilles Veissière (France)

June 7, 2002 Group stage	Argentina	0 – 1	England	Sapporo, Japan
20:30 UTC+9		(Report)	Beckham 44' (pen.)	Stadium: Sapporo Dome; Attendance: 35,927; Referee: Pierluigi Collina (Italy)

June 12, 2002 Group stage	Sweden	1 – 1	Argentina	Miyagi, Japan
15:30 UTC+9	A. Svensson 59'	(Report)	Crespo 88'	Stadium: Miyagi Stadium; Attendance: 45,777; Referee: Ali Bujsaim (United Arab Emirates)
