= Sebastián Romero (footballer, born 1979) =

Argentine footballer

Personal information
- Full name: Miguel Ángel Sebastián Romero
- Date of birth: December 14, 1979 (age 46)
- Place of birth: Florida, Buenos Aires, Argentina
- Height: 1.78 m (5 ft 10 in)
- Positions: Right winger; right-back

Youth career
- Chacarita Juniors

Senior career*
Years	Team	Apps	(Gls)
2000–2003	Chacarita Juniors	112	(6)
2003–2004	Eibar	14	(0)
2004–2005	Gimnasia LP	32	(2)
2005–2006	Banfield	30	(1)
2006–2007	Racing Club	23	(3)
2007–2008	Colón	38	(3)
2009–2011	Independiente Rivadavia	48	(7)
2012–2014	Jorge Wilstermann	54	(5)
2014	Chacarita Juniors	12	(0)
2014–2015	Almirante Brown	37	(4)
- * Club domestic league appearances and goals

Miguel Ángel Sebastián Romero (born 14 December 1979 in Florida, Buenos Aires) is an Argentine former footballer.

== Career ==
Romero started his career in 2000 with Chacarita Juniors, in 2003 he signed a contract with Spanish side Real Sociedad, but never played for the club. Instead, he spent one season with Eibar and returned to Argentina on successive loan deals.

Romero returned to Argentina in 2004 where he has played single seasons for Gimnasia y Esgrima de La Plata, Banfield and Racing Club before joining Colón de Santa Fe in 2007.
