= 2007–08 in Argentine football =

Football in Argentina
- Season: 2007–08

2007–08 season of Argentine football was the 117th season of competitive football in Argentina.

== National leagues ==
=== Primera División ===
- Apertura champion: Lanús (1st title).
  - Top scorer: Germán Denis (18 goals).
- Clausura champion: River Plate (33rd title).
  - Top scorer: Darío Cvitanich (13 goals).
- International qualifiers:
  - 2008 Copa Sudamericana: Estudiantes (LP), San Lorenzo, Argentinos Juniors, Independiente.
  - 2009 Copa Libertadores: Lanús, River Plate.
- Relegated: Olimpo, San Martín de San Juan.

Source: RSSSF

=== Primera B Nacional ===
- Champion: San Martín de Tucumán (1st title).
- Promoted: San Martín de Tucumán, Godoy Cruz.
- Relegated: Almirante Brown, Ben Hur, Nueva Chicago.

Source: RSSSF

=== Primera B Metropolitana ===
- Champion: All Boys (2nd title).
- Promoted: All Boys, Los Andes.
- Relegated: Defensores de Cambaceres.

Source: RSSSF

=== Torneo Argentino A ===
- Champion: Atlético Tucumán (2nd title).
- Promoted: Atlético Tucumán.
- Relegated: La Florida, Luján de Cuyo, Sportivo Patria, La Plata FC.

Source: RSSSF

=== Primera C Metropolitana ===
- Champion: Colegiales (3rd title).
- Promoted: Colegiales.
- Relegated: Sportivo Dock Sud, San Martín de Burzaco.

Source: RSSSF

=== Torneo Argentino B ===
- Promoted: Central Córdoba, Alvarado, Patronato, Deportivo Maipú.
- Relegated: Athletico Ñuñorco, Tres Algarrobos, Atlético Maronese, Gimnasia y Esgrima de Santa Fe.

Source: RSSSF

=== Primera D Metropolitana ===
- Champion: Defensores Unidos (2nd title).
- Promoted: Defensores Unidos, Berazategui.
- Relegated: Muñiz.

Source: RSSSF

== Clubs in international competitions ==
Team / Competition	2007 FIFA Club World Cup	2007 Copa Sudamericana	2008 Copa Libertadores
Boca Juniors	Runner up lost to (Italy) Milan	Round of 16 eliminated by (Brazil) São Paulo	Semifinal eliminated by (Brazil) Fluminense
River Plate	did not qualify	Semifinal eliminated by (Argentina) Arsenal de Sarandí	Round of 16 eliminated by (Argentina) San Lorenzo
Estudiantes de La Plata	did not qualify	First stage eliminated by (Argentina) Lanús	Round of 16 eliminated by (Ecuador) LDU Quito
San Lorenzo	did not qualify	First stage eliminated by (Argentina) Lanús	Quarterfinal eliminated by (Ecuador) LDU Quito
Arsenal de Sarandí	did not qualify	Champions defeated (Mexico) América	Second Stage eliminated (finished 3rd in the group)
Lanús	did not qualify	Round of 16 eliminated by (Brazil) Vasco da Gama	Round of 16 eliminated by (Mexico) Atlas

== National team ==
This section covers Argentina's matches from August 1, 2007 to July 31, 2008.

Win Draw Loss

=== Friendly matches ===
August 22, 2007	Norway	2 – 1	Argentina	Oslo, Norway
20:00 UTC+02	Carew 11' (pen.), 57'	(Report)	Rodríguez 83'	Stadium: Ullevaal Stadion

September 11, 2007	Australia	0 – 1	Argentina	Melbourne, Australia
16:30 UTC+11		(Report)	Demichelis 48'	Stadium: MCG

March 26, 2008	Egypt	0 – 2	Argentina	Cairo, Egypt
21:00 UTC+02		(Report)	Agüero 74'; Burdisso 84'	Stadium: Cairo International Stadium

June 4, 2008	Mexico	1 – 4	Argentina	San Diego, United States
20:00 UTC+08	Zinha 62'	(Report)	Burdisso 11'; Messi 18'; Rodríguez 29'; Agüero 71'	Stadium: Qualcomm Stadium; Attendance: 68,498

June 8, 2008	United States	0 – 0	Argentina	East Rutherford, United States
				Stadium: Giants Stadium; Attendance: 78,682

=== 2010 World Cup qualifiers ===
October 13, 2007 Round 1	Argentina	2 – 0	Chile	Buenos Aires, Argentina
17:40 UTC-3	Riquelme 27', 45'	(Report)		Stadium: Estadio Antonio V. Liberti; Attendance: 55,000; Referee: Martín Vásquez (Uruguay)

October 16, 2007 Round 2	Venezuela	0 – 2	Argentina	Maracaibo, Venezuela
20:40 UTC-4:30		(Report)	Milito 15'; Messi 18'	Stadium: Estadio José Pachencho Romero; Attendance: 10,600; Referee: Carlos Eugênio Simon (Brazil)

November 17, 2007 Round 3	Argentina	3 – 0	Bolivia	Buenos Aires, Argentina
16:00 UTC-3	Agüero 41'; Riquelme 57', 74'	(Report)		Stadium: Estadio Antonio V. Liberti; Attendance: 43,308; Referee: Victor Hugo Rivera (Peru)

November 20, 2007 Round 4	Colombia	2 – 1	Argentina	Bogotá, Colombia
19:50 UTC-5	Bustos 62'; D. Moreno 83'	(Report)	Messi 36'	Stadium: Estadio El Campín; Attendance: 41,700; Referee: Jorge Larrionda (Uruguay)

June 15, 2008 Round 5	Argentina	1 – 1	Ecuador	Buenos Aires, Argentina
18:10 UTC-5	Palacio 89'	(Report)	Urrutia 69'	Stadium: Estadio Antonio V. Liberti; Attendance: 41,167; Referee: René Ortubé (Bolivia)

June 18, 2008 Round 6	Brazil	0 – 0	Argentina	Belo Horizonte, Brazil
21:50 UTC-3		(Report)		Stadium: Mineirão; Attendance: 65,000; Referee: Óscar Ruiz (Colombia)
