= Pablo Mouche =

Argentine footballer

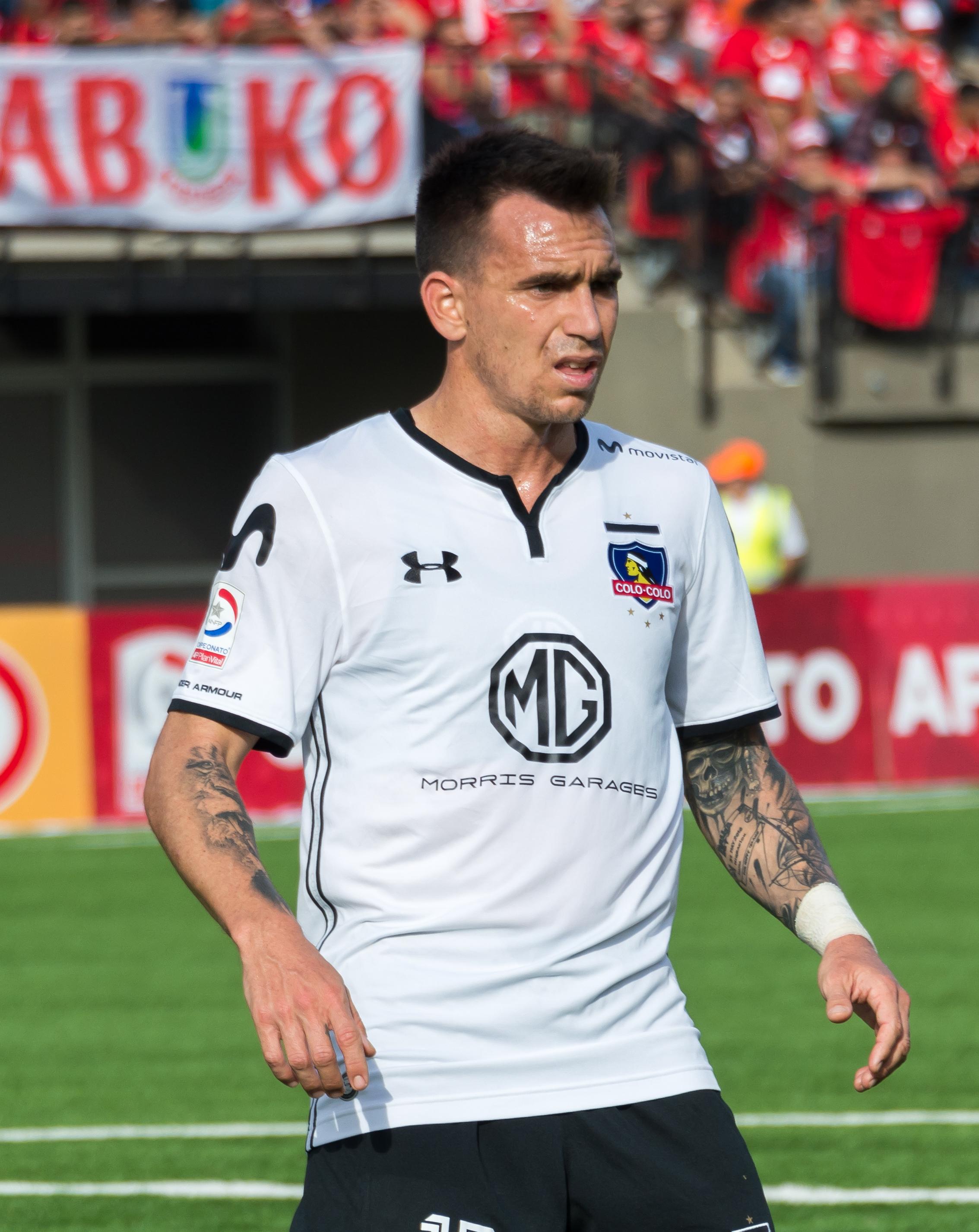
- Mouche with Colo-Colo in 2019

Personal information
- Full name: Pablo Nicolás Mouche
- Date of birth: October 11, 1987 (age 39)
- Place of birth: San Martín, Argentina
- Height: 1.77 m (5 ft 9 1/2 in)
- Positions: Forward; winger

Youth career
- Club Ameghino
- –2003: Estudiantes BA
- 2005–2006: Boca Juniors

Senior career*
| Years | Team | Apps | (Gls) |
| 2003–2005 | Estudiantes BA | 24 | (1) |
| 2005–2012 | Boca Juniors | 103 | (12) |
| 2007 | → Arsenal Sarandí (loan) | 5 | (1) |
| 2012–2014 | Kayserispor | 60 | (13) |
| 2014–2018 | Palmeiras | 22 | (2) |
| 2016 | → Lanús (loan) | 15 | (1) |
| 2016 | → Red Star Belgrade (loan) | 7 | (0) |
| 2017 | → Olimpia Asunción (loan) | 16 | (4) |
| 2017–2018 | → Banfield (loan) | 21 | (3) |
| 2018 | → San Lorenzo (loan) | 12 | (0) |
| 2019–2021 | Colo-Colo | 45 | (6) |
| 2021 | Sud América | 28 | (3) |
| 2022 | Barracas Central | 32 | (4) |
| 2023 | Barracas Central | 19 | (2) |

International career
| 2004 | Argentina U-17 | | |
| 2005 | Argentina U-18 | | |
| 2007 | Argentina U-20 | 9 | (3) |
| 2011 | Argentina | 5 | (2) |
- * Club domestic league appearances and goals as of 19:50, 23 March 2022 (UTC)

Pablo Nicolás Mouche (born 11 October 1987) is an Argentine professional footballer who plays as a forward for Barracas Central. He made his debut for the Argentinian national team in 2011.

== Club career ==
=== Early career ===
==== Estudiantes de Buenos Aires ====
===== 2003–2005 =====
At the age of 15, Mouche debuted for Estudiantes in the Primera B Metropolitana 2002–03 season on 13 June 2003 whilst he was undergoing his fourth year of secondary school. Whilst at Estudiantes, he was the under-study of Ezequiel Lavezzi. Mouche made six appearances for Estudiantes during the 2003–04 season, and scored one goal in 17 league appearances during the 2004–05 season.

=== Boca Juniors ===
==== 2005–2012 ====
In 2005, Mouche was brought to Boca Juniors by his agent, Mariano, where he joined the club's reserve and youth-team.

===== Loan to Arsenal de Sarandí =====
In January 2007, Mouche was loaned to Argentine Primera División side Arsenal de Sarandí on a 6-month deal in order to gain first-team experience. Mouche scored his first goal of the 2006–07 Primera División season in a 4–0 away win against Nueva Chicago on 23 February. He scored Arsenal's third goal in the 66th minute after being substituted onto the field for Cristian Llama in the 65th minute. Mouche made only five league appearances for Arsenal due to injury.

===== 2007–08 season =====
Upon returning to Boca Juniors, Mouche had asked Guillermo Barros Schelotto for permission to wear the number# 7 shirt for the 2007–08 season. Mouche debuted for Boca Juniors in a 1–1 home draw against Independiente on 9 March. Mouche was substituted onto the field for Mauro Boselli in the 88th minute.

===== 2008–09 season =====
Mouche's first game of the 2008–09 season was in a 0–0 away draw against Argentinos Juniors on 17 September. Mouche was substituted onto the field for Ricardo Noir in the 80th minute. One week later, Mouche debuted in the 2008 Copa Sudamericana in a first–leg 4–0 home win against LDU Quito on 23 September. He scored Boca's third goal with a left-footed shot in the 49th minute. Mouche scored his first league goal for Boca Juniors in a 1–0 away win against Banfield on 29 October. Mouche entered the field for Ricardo Noir in the 74th minute and scored in the 79th minute when he dribbled into the 18–yard box from the left touch line and fired a left-footed shot. Mouche played in Boca's second-leg 2–1 home loss against Brazil's Internacional on 6 November. The result saw Boca Juniors eliminated from the tournament as Internacional had won 4–1 on aggregate. San Lorenzo, Tigre and Boca Juniors ended the Torneo Apertura with the same number of points, a three-way playoff was required to determine the champion which Boca Juniors won. Mouche debuted in the 2009 Copa Libertadores on 4 March in a 1–0 away victory against Venezuela's Deportivo Táchira. Mouche was substituted onto the field for Ricardo Noir in the 62nd minute. On 9 March, Mouche received his first red card in a 2–0 away loss against Independiente. Mouche was cautioned in the 11th minute and then received his second yellow card in the 24th minute.

===== 2009–10 season =====
During the 2009 Copa Sudamericana First Stage, Mouche scored in Boca's first-leg 1–1 home draw against Vélez Sarsfield on 20 August. Boca would later lose 2–1 on aggregate and be eliminated from the competition. Mouche's first league appearance of the 2009–10 season came in a 2–2 home draw against Argentinos Juniors on 23 August. He scored his first goal of the season in a 2–1 home loss against Independiente on 5 December, Mouche was substituted onto the field in the 46th minute for Lucas Viatri and scored in the 55th minute. Mouche's second league goal came in a 3–2 away win against Independiente on 2 May, where Mouche scored Boca's third goal in the 87th minute when he dribbled just outside the 18–yard box from the right touch line before scoring with a left-footed shot. Mouche had entered the field for Nicolás Gaitán in the 71st minute and received a yellow card for removing his shirt whilst celebrating his goal, one minute later he received his second yellow card for honouring his goal celebration to Topo Gigio at Independiente's grandstand. Two weeks later, Mouche again received two yellow cards and was sent off of the field in the 82nd minute of Boca's 3–0 away loss against Banfield on 14 May.

===== 2010–11 season =====
Mouche's first appearance of the 2010–11 season came on match day 1 in a 2–1 home defeat against Racing Club on 14 August. Mouche was substituted onto the field for Damián Escudero in the 65th minute. On 13 January 2011, it was reported that English Premier League club West Ham United's co-owner David Sullivan had stepped to offer Mouche a loan deal, provided that he could obtain an Italian passport due to his Italian grandparents. On 23 January 2011, it was reported that Boca Juniors had accepted West Ham United's loan bid for Mouche and that he was supposed to arrive at Upton Park to undergo a medical, but the deal was being held up as West Ham United were waiting for him to obtain an Italian passport which might not have been acquired quickly enough. Mouche's first goal of the season came in a 1–0 away win against Racing Club on 19 February. Mouche scored in the 47th minute of the match. His second league goal came in a 2–2 away draw against Arsenal de Sarandí on 22 May. Mouche levelled the game in the 81st minute. Mouche finished the season having scored 2 goals in 31 league appearances.

===== 2011–12 season =====
Mouche's first appearance in the 2011–12 season came in a 0–0 away draw against Olimpo de Bahía Blanca on 7 August. Mouche had been substituted onto the field for Dario Cvitanich in the 68th minute. Two weeks later, Mouche scored his first goal of the season in a 1–0 away victory against Newell's Old Boys on 21 August. Boca Juniors were crowned champions of the Torneo Apertura and qualified for the 2012 Copa Libertadores. Mouche's first appearance in the 2011–12 Copa Argentina came in a 1–1 round of 64 match against Deportivo Santamarina on 2 February, where Boca Juniors won 4–3 on penalties. Mouche was substituted onto the field for Dario Cvitanich in the 84th minute. One week later, Mouche scored his second league goal in a 2–0 home victory against Olimpo de Bahía Blanca on 10 February. Mouche scored Boca's second goal of the match in the 66th minute. Mouche's first appearance in the 2012 Copa Libertadores came in a 0–0 away draw against Zamora on 14 February, where Mouche was substituted onto the field for Dario Cvitanich in the 61st minute. On 4 March, Mouche scored Boca's second goal in a 2–0 away victory against San Lorenzo. Mouche was substituted onto the field for Dario Cvitanich in the 34th minute before scoring in the 86th minute. Two weeks later, Mouche scored in Boca's 2–1 away victory against Arsenal de Sarandí on 14 March. On 25 March, Mouche netted his fifth league goal in a 2–2 home draw against Lanús. One week later, Mouche scored Boca's third goal in their 3–0 away victory against Estudiantes de La Plata on 1 April. At the round of 16 stage of the Copa Argentina, Mouche scored in the 61st minute of Boca's 1–1 draw with Olimpo de Bahía Blanca on 25 April. Boca won 11–10 on penalties and progressed to the quarter–finals. In the first–leg of Boca's Copa Libertadores round of 16 match against Unión Española, Mouche entered the field for Dario Cvitanich in the 67th minute and assisted Santiago Silva in scoring the winning goal in the last moments of Boca's 2–1 home victory on 2 May. Mouche had received the ball to the left side of the 18–yard box from a Juan Roman Riquelme pass, mouche crossed the ball for Silva to head home the winner in the 89th minute. On 6 May, opened the scoring in Boca's 2–2 away draw against Atlético de Rafaela, scoring in the 30th minute with a left-footed shot. In the second–leg of Boca's Copa Libertadores round of 16 match against Unión Española, Mouche scored Boca's second goal in the 50th minute and assisted Juan Roman Riquelme in scoring Boca's third goal in the 68th minute on 9 May. Boca won 5–3 on aggregate. On 17 May, Mouche scored in the 52nd minute of Boca's 1–0 first–leg quarter–final Copa Libertadores home victory. Mouche received the ball from Dario Cvitanich before shooting to the right bottom corner of the net with a left footed shot. Mouche registered his seventh league goal of the season in a 3–0 home victory against Godoy Cruz on 27 May. Mouche scored Boca's third goal in the 83rd minute. Mouche played in the 2012 Copa Libertadores Final against Corinthians on 27 June and 4 July, where Boca were beaten 3–1 on aggregate.

=== Kayserispor ===
On 19 July 2012, it was reported that Mouche had reached an agreement with Turkish Süper Lig club Kayserispor. Kayserispor were reported to have made a 3.5 million dollars offer for the 70% of the player's permit and Mouche's agent accepted terms with the club on behalf of the player.

=== Palmeiras ===
On 14 June 2014, it was reported that Mouche would travel to São Paulo to sign a four-year contract with Palmeiras, who has paid US$4 million for %70 of his pass transfer, whilst the other %30 of his pass would remain with Boca Juniors. During his first season with the club, Mouche was widely used as a first choice substitute for the attack.

Mouche suffered a serious knee injury during the pre-season in 2015 and missed most of the club's matches. Despite that, he was part of the winning squad of the 2015 Copa do Brasil.

On 26 January 2016, without many chances in the first team, Palmeiras loaned Mouche to Lanús on a six-month deal.

=== Red Star Belgrade ===
Mouche became a target of Serbian team Red Star for their Champions League campaign. After months of speculations, on July 5, 2016, Mouche himself confirmed to the local press that he will sign for Red Star. Mouche was motivated to come to Red Star due to the deteriorating economic situation in Argentina and high life-quality in Belgrade, and also because Red Star is a former European and World champion, and has an ongoing project of making a strong team for this year's European competitions. On July 8, he signed a one-year loan deal with Red Star, with option of a permanent transfer. In Red Star he played along his former Boca Juniors teammate, Luis Ibáñez.

Mouche made his debut in an official match for Red Star just one week after joining the club. On July 12, in the first leg of the second qualifying round of the 2016–17 UEFA Champions League, Red Star played against Valletta F.C. away, during which Mouche entered at half-time as a substitute for Slavoljub Srnić, Red Star won 1–2.

== International career ==
In 2003, Mouche was called up to the Argentina U-17 team, and in 2004 was called up to the Argentina U-18 for a tour in Bolivia. Mouche was picked to join the Argentina Under-20 squad to take part in the 2007 South American Youth Championship in Paraguay. Mouche justified his selection by scoring a hat-trick against Venezuela in a 6–0 victory. The Argentina U-20 team finished in second place and qualified for the 2007 FIFA U-20 World Cup and the 2008 Summer Olympics. In 2011, Mouche was called up to the Argentina national team for a friendly against Venezuela on 16 March. Mouche scored two goals in Argentina's 4–2 victory.

== Honours ==
=== Club ===
Boca Juniors

- Argentine Primera División: 2008 Apertura, 2011 Apertura
- Copa Argentina: 2012
- Recopa Sudamericana: 2008

Palmeiras

- Copa do Brasil: 2015

Lanus

- Argentine Primera División: 2016

=== National team ===
Argentina U-20

- South American Youth Championship: 2007 (silver)

== Career statistics ==
=== Club ===
As of 27 February 2017

| Club | Season | League | | | Cup | | Continental | | Other | | Total | |
| Club | Season | Division | Apps | Goals | Apps | Goals | Apps | Goals | Apps | Goals | Apps | Goals |
|---|---|---|---|---|---|---|---|---|---|---|---|---|
| Estudiantes BA | 2002–03 | Metropolitana | 1 | 0 | — | | — | | — | | 1 | 0 |
| Estudiantes BA | 2003–04 | Metropolitana | 6 | 0 | — | | — | | — | | 6 | 0 |
| Estudiantes BA | 2004–05 | Metropolitana | 17 | 1 | — | | — | | — | | 17 | 1 |
| Estudiantes BA | Total | | 24 | 1 | — | | — | | — | | 24 | 1 |
| Boca Juniors | 2005–06 | Primera División | — | | — | | — | | — | | — | |
| Boca Juniors | 2006–07 | Primera División | — | | — | | — | | — | | — | |
| Boca Juniors | 2007–08 | Primera División | 4 | 0 | — | | 0 | 0 | — | | 4 | 0 |
| Boca Juniors | 2008–09 | Primera División | 23 | 1 | 0 | 0 | 7 | 1 | 0 | 0 | 30 | 2 |
| Boca Juniors | 2009–10 | Primera División | 20 | 2 | — | | 1 | 1 | — | | 21 | 3 |
| Boca Juniors | 2010–11 | Primera División | 31 | 2 | — | | — | | — | | 31 | 3 |
| Boca Juniors | 2011–12 | Primera División | 35 | 7 | 4 | 1 | 14 | 3 | — | | 53 | 11 |
| Boca Juniors | Total | | 103 | 12 | 4 | 1 | 22 | 5 | 0 | 0 | 129 | 18 |
| Arsenal de Sarandí (loan) | 2006–07 | Primera División | 5 | 1 | — | | — | | — | | 5 | 1 |
| Kayserispor | 2012–13 | Süper Lig | 28 | 7 | 0 | 0 | — | | — | | 28 | 7 |
| Kayserispor | 2013–14 | Süper Lig | 32 | 6 | 2 | 0 | — | | — | | 34 | 6 |
| Kayserispor | Total | | 60 | 13 | 2 | 0 | — | | — | | 62 | 13 |
| Palmeiras | 2014 | Série A | 17 | 2 | 3 | 1 | — | | — | | 20 | 3 |
| Palmeiras | 2015 | Série A | 5 | 0 | 1 | 0 | — | | — | | 5 | 0 |
| Palmeiras | 2016 | Série A | 0 | 0 | — | | — | | — | | 0 | 0 |
| Palmeiras | 2017 | Série A | — | | — | | — | | — | | — | |
| Palmeiras | Total | | 22 | 2 | 4 | 1 | — | | — | | 26 | 3 |
| Lanús (loan) | 2016 | Primera División | 15 | 1 | 0 | 0 | — | | — | | 15 | 1 |
| Red Star Belgrade (loan) | 2016–17 | SuperLiga | 7 | 0 | 1 | 0 | 6 | 0 | — | | 14 | 0 |
| Olimpia Asuncion (loan) | 2017 | Primera División | 2 | 2 | — | | 4 | 0 | — | | 6 | 2 |
| Career total | | | 238 | 32 | 11 | 2 | 32 | 5 | 0 | 0 | 281 | 39 |

=== International ===
Argentina
| Year | Apps | Goals |
|---|---|---|
| 2011 | 5 | 2 |
| Total | 5 | 2 |

== International goals ==
| # | Date | Venue | Opponent | Score | Result | Competition |
|---|---|---|---|---|---|---|
| 1 | March 16, 2011 | Estadio del Bicentenario, San Juan, Argentina | Venezuela | 2–1 | 4–1 | Friendly |
| 2 | March 16, 2011 | Estadio del Bicentenario, San Juan, Argentina | Venezuela | 3–1 | 4–1 | Friendly |
