= 2008 Recopa Sudamericana =

- Event: Recopa Sudamericana
| Arsenal | Boca Juniors |
| (Argentina) | (Argentina) |
| 3 | 5 |
- (on aggreate)

First leg
| Arsenal | Boca Juniors |
| 1 | 3 |
- Date: August 13, 2008
- Venue: El Cilindro, Avellaneda
- Referee: Gabriel Favale (Argentina)
- Attendance: 10,359

Second leg
| Boca Juniors | Arsenal |
| 2 | 2 |
- Date: August 27, 2008
- Venue: La Bombonera, Buenos Aires
- Referee: Saúl Laverni (Argentina)
- Attendance: 32,357

The 2008 Recopa Sudamericana (officially the 2008 Recopa Visa Sudamericana for sponsorship reasons) was the 16th Recopa Sudamericana, an annual football match between the winners of the previous season's Copa Libertadores and Copa Sudamericana competitions.

The match was contested by Boca Juniors, winners of the 2007 Copa Libertadores, and Arsenal, winners of the 2007 Copa Sudamericana. Boca Juniors won their 4th Recopa Sudamericana title after accumulating the most points over the two legs (4-1). The title ties them in first place for the most international titles won by a club with 18. (Note: This count only include tournaments organised by Conmebol and other associations so Boca Juniors had won a total of 22 titles by then.)

== Qualified teams ==
| Team | Previous finals app. |
|---|---|
| (Argentina) Arsenal | None |
| (Argentina) Boca Juniors | **1990**, 2004, **2005**, **2006** |

Bold indicates winning years

== Venues ==
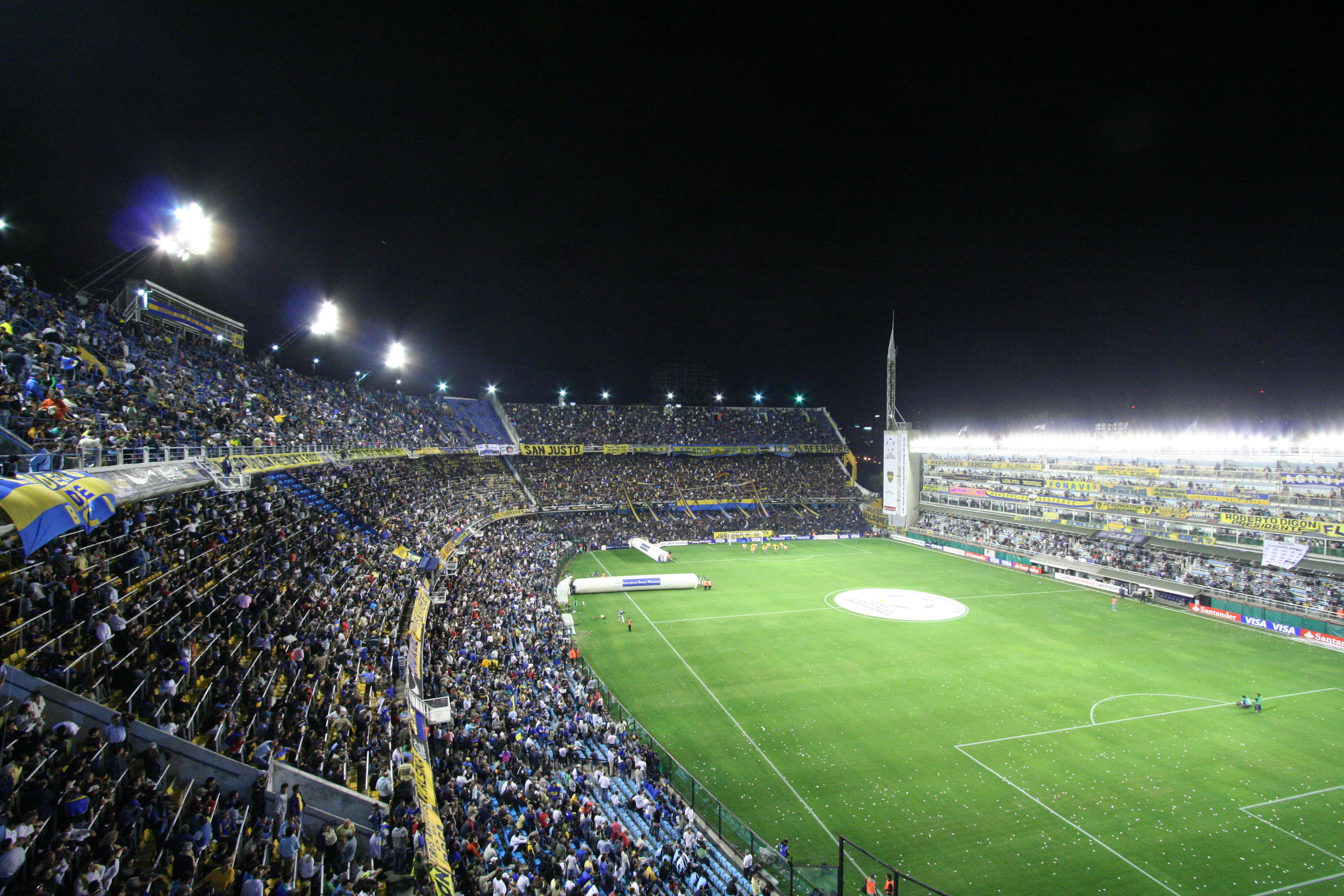
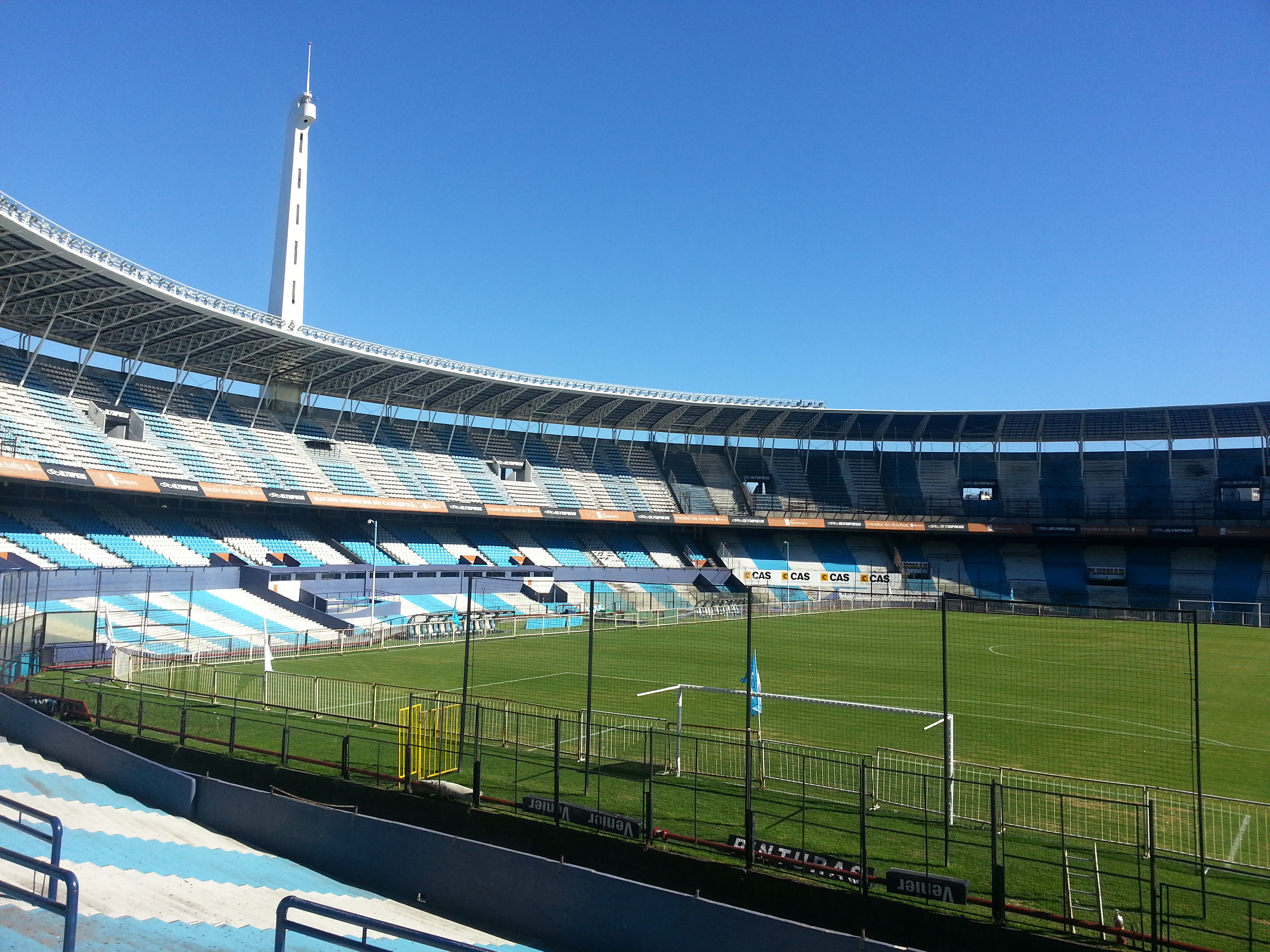
La Bombonera (left) and El Cilindro, venues of the series

== Match details ==
=== First leg ===
2008 Recopa Sudamericana
August 13, 2008
19:30 (UTC−3)
First leg

| Arsenal (Argentina) | 1–3 | (Argentina) Boca Juniors |
|---|---|---|
| Sava 25' | Report | Palermo 21'; Palacio 32'; Battaglia 90' |

El Cilindro, Avellaneda
Attendance: 10,359
Referee: Gabriel Favale (Argentina)

| **Arsenal** | **Boca Juniors** |

| GK | 1 | (Argentina) Mario Cuenca | (substituted off) 46' |
| MF | 5 | (Argentina) Cristian Pellerano |
| MF | 10 | (Argentina) Alejandro Gómez |
| FW | 11 | (Argentina) Facundo Sava |
| MF | 13 | (Argentina) Carlos Casteglione (c) | (yellow card) 37' |
| DF | 14 | (Argentina) Javier Gandolfi | (yellow card) 33' |
| MF | 15 | (Argentina) Damián Pérez | (yellow card) 41' (substituted off) 66' |
| DF | 6 | (Argentina) Aníbal Matellán | (yellow card) 76' |
| DF | 21 | (Colombia) Josimar Mosquera | (yellow card) 20' |
| MF | 23 | (Argentina) Sebastián Carrera | (substituted off) 81' |
| DF | 24 | (Argentina) Javier Yacuzzi |
Substitutes:
| GK | 12 | (Argentina) Cristian Campestrini | (substituted on) 46' |
| DF | 3 | (Paraguay) Carlos Báez |
| DF | 4 | (Argentina) Darío Espínola | (substituted on) 66' |
| MF | 7 | (Argentina) Andrés San Martín |
| FW | 9 | (Argentina) Luciano Leguizamón | (yellow card) 90' (substituted on) 81' |
| MF | 17 | (Argentina) Facundo Coria |
| DF | 20 | (Argentina) Nicolás Aguirre |
Manager:
(Argentina) Daniel Garnero

| GK | 1 | (Argentina) Mauricio Caranta |
| DF | 4 | (Argentina) Hugo Ibarra |
| DF | 2 | (Paraguay) Julio Cáceres |
| DF | 16 | (Argentina) Gabriel Paletta |
| DF | 3 | (Paraguay) Claudio Morel |
| MF | 22 | (Colombia) Fabián Vargas |
| MF | 5 | (Argentina) Sebastián Battaglia | (yellow card) 82' |
| MF | 23 | (Argentina) Jesús Dátolo | (yellow card) 81' (substituted off) 90' |
| MF | 11 | (Argentina) Leandro Gracián | (substituted off) 75' |
| FW | 9 | (Argentina) Martín Palermo (c) |
| FW | 14 | (Argentina) Rodrigo Palacio | (substituted off) 75' |
Substitutes:
| GK | 12 | (Argentina) Javier Hernán García |
| DF | 13 | (Argentina) Facundo Roncaglia |
| DF | 15 | (Uruguay) Álvaro González | (substituted on) 90' |
| MF | 19 | (Argentina) Neri Cardozo | (substituted on) 75' |
| MF | 21 | (Argentina) Cristian Chávez |
| FW | 17 | (Argentina) Ricardo Noir | (substituted on) 75' |
Manager:
(Argentina) Carlos Ischia

Assistant referees:
(Argentina) Horacio Herrero
(Argentina) Ariel Bustos
Fourth official:
(Argentina) Juan Pablo Pompei

=== Second leg ===
August 27, 2008
20:00 (UTC−3)
Second leg

| Boca Juniors (Argentina) | 2–2 | (Argentina) Arsenal |
|---|---|---|
| Palacio 7'; Riquelme 90+1' | Report | Carrera 58'; Matos 69' |

La Bombonera, Buenos Aires
Attendance: 32,357
Referee: Saúl Laverni (Argentina)

| **Boca Juniors** | **Arsenal** |

| GK | 1 | (Argentina) Mauricio Caranta | (yellow card) 85' |
| DF | 4 | (Argentina) Hugo Ibarra (c) |
| DF | 2 | (Paraguay) Julio Cáceres |
| DF | 16 | (Argentina) Gabriel Paletta |
| DF | 3 | (Paraguay) Claudio Morel |
| MF | 22 | (Colombia) Fabián Vargas |
| MF | 5 | (Argentina) Sebastián Battaglia |
| MF | 23 | (Argentina) Jesús Dátolo | (substituted off) 72' |
| MF | 10 | (Argentina) Juan Román Riquelme |
| FW | 14 | (Argentina) Rodrigo Palacio | (substituted off) 75' |
| FW | 7 | (Argentina) Lucas Viatri |
Substitutes:
| GK | 12 | (Argentina) Javier Hernán García |
| MF | 11 | (Argentina) Leandro Gracián |
| DF | 13 | (Argentina) Facundo Roncaglia |
| DF | 15 | (Uruguay) Álvaro González |
| FW | 17 | (Argentina) Ricardo Noir | (substituted on) 75' |
| MF | 21 | (Argentina) Cristian Chávez | (substituted on) 72' |
| FW | 24 | (Argentina) Lucas Castromán |
Manager:
(Argentina) Carlos Ischia

| GK | 12 | (Argentina) Cristian Campestrini |
| DF | 4 | (Argentina) Darío Espínola |
| DF | 3 | (Paraguay) Carlos Báez | (red card) 64' |
| DF | 6 | (Argentina) Aníbal Matellán | (yellow card) 37' |
| DF | 18 | (Argentina) Christian Díaz | (red card) 80' |
| MF | 23 | (Argentina) Sebastián Carrera | (substituted off) 89' |
| MF | 13 | (Argentina) Carlos Casteglione (c) |
| DF | 24 | (Argentina) Javier Yacuzzi | (yellow card) 5' |
| MF | 10 | (Argentina) Alejandro Gómez |
| FW | 9 | (Argentina) Luciano Leguizamón | (substituted off) 46' |
| FW | 16 | (Argentina) Mauro Matos | (substituted off) 85' |
Substitutes:
| GK | 19 | (Argentina) Matías Alasia |
| FW | 8 | (Argentina) Sergio Sena | (substituted on) 89' |
| DF | 2 | (Argentina) Mariano Brau |
| MF | 5 | (Argentina) Cristian Pellerano |
| MF | 15 | (Argentina) Damián Pérez |
| MF | 17 | (Argentina) Facundo Coria | (substituted on) 85' |
| DF | 7 | (Guatemala) José Manuel Contreras | (substituted on) 46' |
Manager:
(Argentina) Daniel Garnero

Assistant referees:
(Argentina) Francisco Rocchio
(Argentina) Gustavo Esquivel
Fourth official:
(Argentina) Federico Beligoy
