= Gabriel Paletta =

Association football player (born 1986)

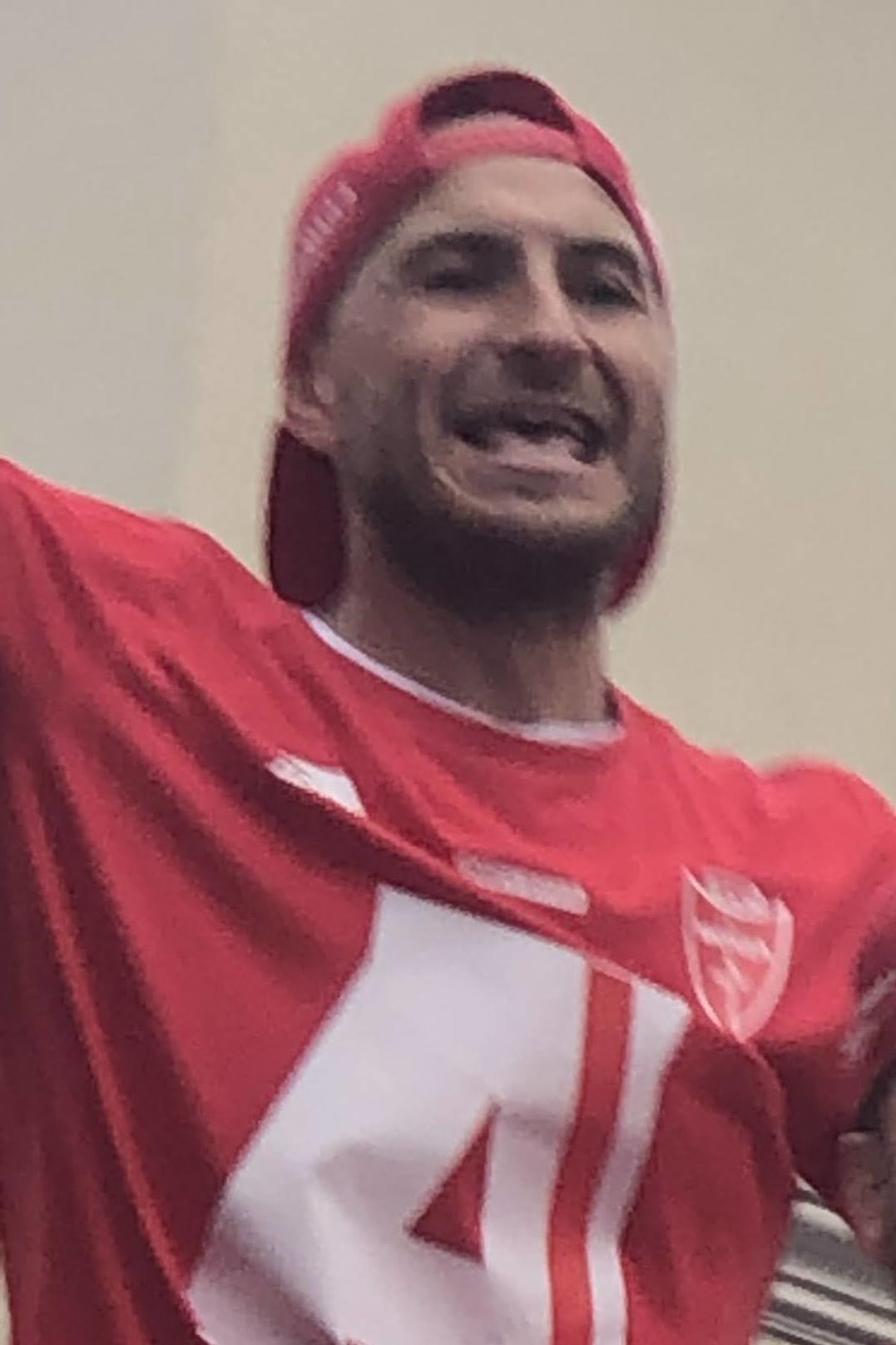
- Paletta with Monza in 2022

Personal information
- Full name: Gabriel Alejandro Paletta
- Date of birth: 15 February 1986 (age 40)
- Place of birth: Longchamps, Argentina
- Height: 1.90 m (6 ft 3 in)
- Position: Centre-back

Youth career
- 2002–2005: Banfield

Senior career*
Years	Team	Apps	(Gls)
2005–2006	Banfield	42	(5)
2006–2007	Liverpool	3	(0)
2007–2010	Boca Juniors	59	(5)
2010–2015	Parma	123	(5)
2015–2018	AC Milan	44	(2)
2015–2016	→ Atalanta (loan)	24	(1)
2018–2019	Jiangsu Suning	42	(1)
2019–2023	Monza	45	(2)
Total		382	(21)

International career
2005	Argentina U20	7	(0)
2014	Italy	3	(0)
- * Club domestic league appearances and goals

Gabriel Alejandro Paletta (Italian: [paˈletta]; born 15 February 1986) is a former professional footballer who played as a centre-back.

Born in Argentina to parents of Italian descent, Paletta represented his birth nation at the under-20 level, participating in the 2005 FIFA World Youth Championship in the Netherlands. He started all seven matches as Argentina won the title. In 2014, Paletta was called up to the Italy national team and made his debut in a friendly against Spain. He represented Italy at the FIFA World Cup later that year.

== Club career ==
=== Banfield ===
Paletta came through the youth divisions of Banfield and reached the first team in 2005. When Banfield qualified for the knockout stages of the Copa Libertadores, they altered their 25-man squad for the event to include Paletta and immediately threw him into action against the Colombian team Independiente Medellín. Paletta played well and Banfield progressed, but Paletta was to play no further part in the tournament after being called up to the Argentina under-20 team to participate in the 2005 FIFA World Youth Championship.

=== Liverpool ===
In February 2006, Paletta agreed to sign with Liverpool and eventually signed a four-year contract on 4 July 2006. Paletta became the second Argentine to play for the Merseyside club, after Mauricio Pellegrino. Paletta's first appearance for Liverpool came in a pre-season friendly against Wrexham in July. He scored his first goal for Liverpool during a 2006–07 Football League Cup third round 4–3 win against Reading on 25 October 2006. Paletta debuted for Liverpool in the 2006–07 Premier League season in a 4–0 away win against Wigan Athletic on 2 December; he was substituted onto the field for Sami Hyypiä in the 61st minute. Paletta would go on to make just two more league appearances for Liverpool.

Paletta debuted in the 2006–07 UEFA Champions League in a group stage fixture in a 3–2 away defeat against Galatasaray on 5 December. He was substituted off of the field in the 66th minute for Luis García. Paletta played a full 90 minutes of Liverpool's 2006–07 Football League Cup quarter-final match, a 6–3 home defeat against Arsenal on 9 January 2007. By the time that Paletta had made just eight appearances for Liverpool in all competitions, it was reported on 9 July that Paletta would be loaned to Spanish club Levante in order to gain some valuable first-team experience as Levante had expressed their interest signing Paletta on loan deal for the whole of 2007–08 season. Although Liverpool manager Rafael Benítez had agreed to loaning the defender, the loan deal was not reached. Liverpool went on to reach the final of the 2006–07 UEFA Champions League, losing 2–1 to AC Milan on 23 May 2007. On 26 August, it had been officially reported that Liverpool had agreed for Paletta to sign with Boca Juniors, having welcomed the arrival of Argentine Emiliano Insúa.

=== Boca Juniors ===
==== 2007–08 season ====
In August 2007, Paletta joined Boca Juniors where he was handed the number 29 shirt. He debuted for Boca Juniors in the Torneo Apertura of the 2007–08 Primera División season on 29 August 2007. One month later, Paletta scored his first goal for Boca Juniors in the 84th minute of a 2–2 home draw with Gimnasia de Jujuy on 23 September. He participated in his first Superclásico, which resulted in a 2–0 win to River Plate at the Estadio Monumental, on 7 October. Paletta played a full 90 minutes of Boca's 2007 FIFA Club World Cup 1–0 semi-final win against Étoile du Sahel on 12 December. Four days later, he played a full 90 minutes of the final which resulted in a 4–2 win for European champions Milan on 16 December.

During the 2008 Torneo de Verano, Paletta scored with header from a Jesús Dátolo free-kick in the 3–2 Copa Revancha loss against River Plate. Paletta's first appearance in the 2008 Copa Libertadores came in a 1–1 away draw against Venezuelan club Maracaibo on 20 February. He received his first red card during the Torneo Clausura in a 1–1 home draw against Independiente on 9 March. Paletta scored his first Copa Libertadores goal after nine minutes in Boca's last group stage fixture, a 3–0 home win against Maracaibo on 22 April. The 3–0 win meant that Boca advanced to the 2008 Copa Libertadores knockout stages. Paletta scored his second league goal for Boca in a 2–1 home victory against Racing Club on 17 May. Paletta participated in the Copa Libertadores knockout stage fixtures until Boca were eliminated by Fluminense in the semi-finals. He scored his third league goal for Boca with a header in the 40th minute of the first-half, in a 6–2 home victory against Tigre on 22 June.

==== 2008–09 season ====
Paletta played in both of Boca's 2008 Recopa Sudamericana matches, defeating Arsenal de Sarandí 5–3 on aggregate, winning 3–1 on 13 August and drawing 2–2 on 27 August. On 11 November, it was reported that MRI scans confirmed that Paletta had torn the cruciate ligament in his right knee after a 1–0 away victory against Arsenal de Sarandí on 9 November, and was ruled out of play for six months. Boca's club doctor, José Veiga, had seen that Paletta had a knee twist and ordered him to undergo some scans after the 1–0 victory against Arsenal. Boca Juniors went on to claim the Torneo Apertura title of the 2008–09 Argentine Primera División season. Paletta returned in a 2–1 home win against Arsenal de Sarandí on 17 May, playing a full 90 minutes of the match. One week later, Paletta suffered an ankle sprain and was substituted off of the field in the 15th minute for Gastón Sauro in a 2–0 away loss against Vélez Sársfield on 24 May. Boca had also participated in the 2009 Copa Libertadores, reaching the knockout stages of the tournament where they were eliminated by Uruguayan club Defensor Sporting.

==== 2009–10 season ====
In August 2009, it was reported that a deal with Paletta and Italian club Palermo fell through due to a disagreement of Paletta's price. Greek club Panathinaikos were also chasing his signature. Paletta played a full 90 minutes of Boca Juniors 2009 Copa Sudamericana First Stage match, a 1–1 draw with Vélez Sársfield on 20 August. Paletta scored an own goal for Boca in the 73rd minute, levelling the scores. He again played a full 90 minutes of the second-leg, where Boca Juniors were defeated 1–0 on 16 September. The 2–1 aggregate loss saw Boca Juniors eliminated from the competition. Paletta received his first red card of the 2009–10 Argentine Primera División season in a 4–2 away loss against Newell's Old Boys on 6 February. His first goal of the 2009–2010 season came in a 2–1 home defeat against Huracán on 9 May. Paletta scored in the 50th minute with a right footed shot. Paletta's last game for Boca Juniors came in a 3–0 away defeat against his former club Banfield on 14 May, where he scored an own goal in the 67th minute.

=== Parma ===
On 6 July 2010, Italian Serie A club Parma announced via their website the acquisition outright of Paletta from Boca Juniors. He was a regular in the side, seeing off the challenge of Massimo Paci and partnering Alessandro Lucarelli. This partnership continued for the first half of the following season under Franco Colomba, but Roberto Donadoni's arrival in January 2012 saw a switch to three defenders and Paletta enjoyed a fine end to the season.

In August 2012, Paletta signed a three-year extension to the contract he signed with the club in 2010; It tied him to the club until 2017.

=== AC Milan ===
On 2 February 2015, Milan signed Paletta for €3.5 million fee. He signed a 3.5-year contract.

On 27 August 2015, Paletta signed for Atalanta on a season-long loan.

Upon his return to Milan, Paletta was often selected by manager Vincenzo Montella, making 30 appearances and scoring two goals in the 2016–17 Serie A season. During the season, he had also been sent off a record 5 times, two of which were straight red cards.

With the arrival of 11 new players in the summer transfer window, including central defenders Mateo Musacchio and Leonardo Bonucci, Paletta's opportunities at the club had been significantly limited. Despite being featured in a few friendly games during the summer, Paletta had been declared "out of project" by manager Vincenzo Montella, who was dismissed in November 2018. Nevertheless, Paletta was included in Milan's squad list for the group stage of Europa League. While continuing to train with the senior team, Paletta made several appearances for the club's youth team, managed by Gennaro Gattuso at the time. With Gattuso's appointment as a head coach of the senior team, Paletta got a rare opportunity to play full 90 minutes in an away Europa League 0–2 defeat against Rijeka once Milan had already qualified for the knockout stage.

Paletta was released from his contract on 30 January 2018 by mutual consent.

=== Jiangsu Suning ===
On 23 February 2018, Paletta signed for Chinese Super League club Jiangsu Suning.

=== Monza ===
After being released by Jiangsu Suning, on 6 November 2019 Paletta signed a three-year contract for then-Serie C club Monza, owned by former AC Milan chairman Silvio Berlusconi and coached by his former teammate Cristian Brocchi. Paletta contributed to Monza's promotions to Serie B for the 2020–21 season, and then to Serie A for the 2022–23 season, but did not make any appearances for the club in the top tier due to injury. His contract with Monza was terminated by mutual consent on 21 February 2023.

== International career ==
In 2005, Paletta was selected for the Argentina under-20 team to participate in the 2005 FIFA World Youth Championship. He started in all seven games of the tournament, playing in the heart of the Argentine defence in a side also featuring future senior team stars Lionel Messi and Sergio Agüero. Argentina went on to win the tournament, and Paletta's performances attracted the attention of Liverpool.

In possession of an Italian passport due to his ancestry from Savelli in the province of Crotone, in Calabria, where his great-grandfather Vincenzo emigrated from, Paletta is also eligible for the Italy national team. In March 2014, he was called up to Italy's squad for a friendly against Spain. He earned his first cap on 5 March, playing the full 90 minutes in the 0–1 loss against Spain.

On 1 June of that year, Paletta was named in Italy's squad for the 2014 FIFA World Cup. He made his competitive debut in the team's opening match, starting alongside Andrea Barzagli in central defence as the Azzurri beat England in Manaus.

== Style of play ==
Paletta is capable of playing as a centre-back in both a three or four-man defence. He is good in possession and an attentive man-marker, although he is primarily known for his composure, aerial ability and heading accuracy; he has also drawn some criticism at times for being inconsistent, error-prone, and excessively aggressive when tackling, which led to unnecessary bookings and expulsions on numerous occasions.

== Career statistics ==
=== Club ===
As of match played 19 October 2022

Appearances and goals by club, season and competition
Club	Season	League			National cup (Note: Includes Copa Argentina, FA Cup, Coppa Italia, Chinese FA Cup)		League cup (Note: Includes EFL Cup)		Continental		Other		Total	
Club	Season	Division	Apps	Goals	Apps	Goals	Apps	Goals	Apps	Goals	Apps	Goals	Apps	Goals
Banfield	2005–06	Primera División	42	5	—		—		0	0	—		42	5
Liverpool	2006–07	Premier League	3	0	0	0	3	1	2	0	—		8	1
Boca Juniors	2007–08	Primera División	21	4	—		—		7	1	2 (Note: Appearances in FIFA Club World Cup)	0	30	5
Boca Juniors	2008–09	Primera División	16	0	—		—		0	0	2 (Note: Appearances in Recopa Sudamericana)	0	18	0
Boca Juniors	2009–10	Primera División	22	1	—		—		2	0	0	0	24	1
Boca Juniors	Total		59	5	0	0	0	0	9	1	4	0	72	6
Parma	2010–11	Serie A	27	0	1	0	—		—		—		28	0
Parma	2011–12	Serie A	33	4	2	0	—		—		—		35	4
Parma	2012–13	Serie A	35	1	1	0	—		—		—		36	1
Parma	2013–14	Serie A	21	0	2	0	—		—		—		23	0
Parma	2014–15	Serie A	7	0	2	1	—		—		—		9	1
Parma	Total		123	5	8	1	0	0	0	0	0	0	131	6
AC Milan	2014–15	Serie A	14	0	0	0	—		—		—		14	0
AC Milan	2016–17	Serie A	30	2	1	0	—		—		1 (Note: Appearance in Supercoppa Italiana)	0	32	2
AC Milan	2017–18	Serie A	0	0	0	0	—		1	0	—		1	0
AC Milan	Total		44	2	1	0	0	0	1	0	1	0	47	2
Atalanta	2015–16	Serie A	24	1	0	0	—		—		—		24	1
Jiangsu Suning	2018	Chinese Super League	24	1	3	0	—		—		—		27	1
Jiangsu Suning	2019	Chinese Super League	18	0	1	0	—		—		—		19	0
Jiangsu Suning	Total		42	1	4	0	0	0	0	0	0	0	46	1
Monza	2019–20	Serie C	7	1	0	0	—		—		—		7	1
Monza	2020–21	Serie B	20	1	0	0	—		—		1 (Note: Appearance(s) in Serie B promotion play-offs)	0	21	1
Monza	2021–22	Serie B	18	0	1	0	—		—		2	0	21	0
Monza	2022–23	Serie A	0	0	1	0	—		—		—		1	0
Monza	Total		45	2	2	0	0	0	0	0	3	0	51	2
Career total			375	20	16	1	3	1	12	1	8	0	414	23

=== International ===
Appearances and goals by national team and year
National team	Year	Apps	Goals
Italy	2014	3	0
Total		3	0

== Honours ==
Boca Juniors

- Recopa Sudamericana: 2008
- Argentine Primera División: 2008 Torneo Apertura
- FIFA Club World Cup runner-up: 2007

AC Milan

- Supercoppa Italiana: 2016

Monza

- Serie C Group A: 2019–20

Argentina U20

- FIFA World Youth Championship: 2005
