= Claudio Morel =

Paraguayan footballer (born 1978)

- Morel with Paraguay in 2010

Personal information
- Full name: Claudio Marcelo Morel Rodríguez
- Date of birth: 2 February 1978 (age 48)
- Place of birth: Asunción, Paraguay
- Height: 1.75 m (5 ft 9 in)
- Positions: Left-back; centre-back

Team information
- Current team: Boca Juniors (youth coach)

Youth career
- 1995–1998: San Lorenzo

Senior career*
Years	Team	Apps	(Gls)
1998–2004	San Lorenzo	135	(2)
2004–2010	Boca Juniors	149	(1)
2010–2012	Deportivo La Coruña	33	(0)
2012–2014	Independiente	53	(1)
2014	Sol de América	14	(0)
2015	12 de Octubre		
2016	Sarmiento de Leones	14	(2)
2017–2018	San Eliseo		

International career
2000	Paraguay U23		
1999–2010	Paraguay	35	(0)

Managerial career
- 2019–XXXX: San Eliseo
- 2021–: Boca Juniors (youth coach)
- * Club domestic league appearances and goals

Claudio Marcelo Morel Rodríguez (born 2 February 1978) is a Paraguayan former footballer who played as a defender.

He holds the player record for the most Copa Sudamericana wins with three, which he won with San Lorenzo in 2002, and Boca Juniors in 2004 and 2005.

He also played as a left-back for the Paraguay national team. He is the son of ex-Paraguayan footballer Eugenio Morel.

== Career ==
=== Club career ===
==== San Lorenzo ====
Morel Rodríguez started his career in Argentina with San Lorenzo in the Primera División. In the 2000–01 season he won the Clausura with San Lorenzo, and in 2001 he helped them win the Copa Mercosur, beating Brazilian club Flamengo in the final.

He scored his first goal for the club on 5 October 2002 in a 2–1 win over Newell's Old Boys at the Estadio Pedro Bidegain. He won the 2002 Copa Sudamericana with the club, beating Atlético Nacional of Colombia 4–0 in the final in November 2002.

He scored one more goal for San Lorenzo also in the 2002–03 season, and also against Newell's Old Boys, in a 2–1 defeat on 2 May 2003 at the Estadio Newell's Old Boys.

==== Boca Juniors ====
He moved to Boca Juniors in 2004 and made his Boca debut in a 0–0 draw against Lanús on 15 August 2004. His first trophy with Boca came in 2004 when the club won the Copa Sudamericana, by beating Bolivian club Bolivar 2–1 over two legs in the final. In 2005, he won the Recopa Sudamericana and the Copa Sudamericana as well as winning both the 2005 Apertura and the 2006 Clausura in the 2005–2006 season. He won the Recopa Sudamericana 2006 with Boca, beating São Paulo 4–3 on aggregate.

On 10 February 2007, Morel scored his first goal with Boca Juniors in a 4–0 victory over Banfield, later that year in December he played in the 2007 FIFA Club World Cup in Japan and helped Boca to the runners-up spot, losing to Italian club A.C. Milan 4–2 in the final.

He was runner-up behind fellow Paraguayan Salvador Cabañas in the 2007 South American Footballer of the Year award. He was also selected in the "Ideal Eleven of South America in 2007". In August 2008 he helped Boca win the 2008 Recopa Sudamericana, beating fellow Argentine club Arsenal 5–3 on aggregate. In December 2008 he was chosen as the Paraguayan footballer of the year by the press.

On 20 June 2010, prior to Paraguay's group match against Slovakia at the 2010 FIFA World Cup, Boca Juniors announced they would not renew Morel Rodríguez' contract.

=== Return to Paraguay ===
In 2015, he and Sol de América colleague Aureliano Torres both joined 12 de Octubre of the División Intermedia.

=== International career ===
He made his international debut in 1999.

Morel Rodríguez also represented Paraguay U23 at the 2000 CONMEBOL Men Pre-Olympic Tournament, making three appearances.

He played in the 2002 World Cup qualifiers, and has played in the qualifying games for the 2010 World Cup.

== Later and coaching career ==
After a spell at Sarmiento de Leones, Morel began playing for Argentine amateur club San Eliseo in San Vicente. In the beginning of 2019 it was reported, that Morel had been appointed manager of the club.

In August 2020, there were rumors about Morel would be appointed manager of Ciclón de Tarija. However, the rumors was never officially confirmed.

In February 2021, Morel returned to Boca Juniors as a youth coach.

== Honours ==
San Lorenzo

- Argentine Primera División: 2001 Clausura
- Copa Mercosur: 2001
- Copa Sudamericana: 2002

Boca Juniors

- Argentine Primera División: 2005 Apertura, 2006 Clausura, 2008 Apertura
- Copa Sudamericana: 2004, 2005
- Recopa Sudamericana: 2005, 2006, 2008
- Copa Libertadores: 2007

Individual

- Paraguayan Footballer of the Year: 2008

== Career statistics ==
=== Club ===
Equipo	Temporada	Liga local		Copa local^{(1)}		Competición internacional^{(2)}		Total	
Equipo	Temporada	PJ	Goles	PJ	Goles	PJ	Goles	PJ	Goles
San Lorenzo
San Lorenzo	1998–1999	8	0	--	--		--	--	--
San Lorenzo	1999–2000	27	0	--	--		--	27	0
San Lorenzo	2000–2001	10	0	--	--		--	10	0
San Lorenzo	2001–2002	29	0	--	--		--	29	0
San Lorenzo	2002–2003	32	2	--	--		--	40	2
San Lorenzo	2003–2004	29	0	--	--		--	29	0
San Lorenzo	Total	135	2	--	--	50	1	185	3
Boca Juniors
Boca Juniors	Apertura 2004	14	0	--	--	2	0	16	0
Boca Juniors	Clausura 2005	11	0	--	--	6	0	16	0
Boca Juniors	Apertura 2005	9	0	--	--	2	0	11	0
Boca Juniors	Clausura 2006	10	0	--	--	0	0	10	0
Boca Juniors	Apertura 2006	16	0	--	--	4	0	20	0
Boca Juniors	Torneo Clausura 2007	13	1	--	--	14	0	27	1
Boca Juniors	Torneo Apertura 2007	15	0	--	--	4	0	19	0
Boca Juniors	Clausura 2008	13	0	--	--	9	0	22	0
Boca Juniors	Torneo Apertura 2008	16	0	--	--	2	0	18	0
Boca Juniors	Torneo Clausura 2009	8	0	--	--	5	0	13	0
Boca Juniors	Torneo Apertura 2009	11	0	--	--	2	0	13	0
Boca Juniors	Torneo Clausura 2010	13	0	--	--	0	0	13	0
Boca Juniors	Total	149	1	--	--	50	0	199	1
Deportivo de La Coruña	2010/2011	15	0	1	0	0	0	16	0
Deportivo de La Coruña	2011/2012	18	0	1	0	--	--	19	0
Deportivo de La Coruña	Total	33	0	2	0	0	0	35	0
Total de su carrera		317	3	2	0	100	1	419	4

Estadísticas actualizadas a la fecha: 29 de mayo de 2012.

- ^{1}Las copas locales se refieren a la Copa del Rey.
- ^{2}Las competiciones internacionales se refieren a la Copa Libertadores, Copa Sudamericana, Copa Mercosur, Mundial de Clubes y Recopa Sudamericana.

== See also ==
- Players and Records in Paraguayan Football
