= Lucas Castromán =

Argentine footballer

Personal information
- Full name: Lucas Martín Castromán
- Date of birth: 2 October 1980 (age 46)
- Place of birth: Luján, Buenos Aires, Argentina
- Height: 1.74 m (5 ft 9 in)
- Positions: Attacking midfielder; right midfielder; right winger

Youth career
- Vélez Sársfield

Senior career*
Years	Team	Apps	(Gls)
1997–2000	Vélez Sársfield	68	(5)
2000–2003	Lazio	37	(4)
2003–2004	→ Udinese (loan)	20	(1)
2004–2007	Vélez Sársfield	38	(13)
2007–2008	Club América	9	(0)
2008	→ Boca Juniors (loan)	5	(0)
2009–2010	Racing Club	37	(3)

International career
1997–1999	Argentina U20		
2000–2005	Argentina	5	(0)
- * Club domestic league appearances and goals

Lucas Martín Castromán (born 2 October 1980) is a retired Argentine footballer, who played as an attacking midfielder, right midfielder, or right winger.

== Club career ==
Castromán began his professional career with Vélez Sársfield in 1997, with Marcelo Bielsa as a coach. His consistent performances in midfield awarded him a lucrative transfer to Lazio in the Italian Serie A, in 2001. There he became suddenly popular amongst Lazio's fans because of a late equalising goal scored in the very last minute of a derby against cross-city rivals Roma that were leading the game 2–1 until then. During his time at Lazio, he was awarded an Italian passport, thus counting as an EU player.

In 2003, he was loaned to fellow Italians Udinese before returning to Vélez in 2004.

Castromán, a firm favourite with the Vélez fans, reinforced his place in the history of the club by helping the team to win the Argentine Primera División Clausura tournament in 2005 after the club's run of 7 years without a trophy. During that tournament, Vélez' coach Miguel Ángel Russo, seeing the team's position of right and left winger were well covered by Jonás Gutiérrez and Marcelo Bravo, used Castromán as a second striker. Castromán played at great level in his new position, and was the team's topscorer along Rolando Zárate during the aforementioned Clausura tournament. After personal differences with Vélez Sársfield coach, Ricardo La Volpe, Castromán decided it was time to change teams, joining Club América of Mexico.

After only six months with Club América he was transfer listed on 17 December 2007 putting an end to his time with the club where injuries, poor physical condition and poor discipline on and off the field led to his departure. He was loaned to Boca Juniors for US$1,050,000. Though not a first choice player in Boca, he was part of the Apertura 2008 and 2008 Recopa Sudamericana winning teams.

He signed a one-year contract with Racing Club de Avellaneda on 6 February 2009.

== International career ==
Castromán earned 5 caps for Argentina between 2000 and 2005.

== Career statistics ==
Argentina national team
Year	Apps	Goals
2000	1	0
2001	0	0
2002	0	0
2003	3	0
2004	0	0
2005	1	0
Total	5	0

== Honours ==
Vélez Sársfield

- Argentine Primera División: Clausura 1998, Clausura 2005

Boca Juniors

- Argentine Primera División: Apertura 2008
- Recopa Sudamericana: 2008

Argentina U20

- South American Youth Championship: 1999
