= Cristian Chávez =

Cristian Chávez is the name of:

- Cristian Chávez (footballer, born 1987)
- Cristian Chávez (footballer, born 1986)

== See also ==
- Christian Chávez, Mexican singer and actor
