= Carlos Báez =

Carlos Báez may refer to:

- Carlos Báez (athlete) (born 1948), Puerto Rican middle-distance runner
- Carlos Báez (footballer, born 1953), Paraguayan football forward
- Carlos Báez (footballer, born 1982), Paraguayan football defender
