= Mauricio Caranta =

Argentine footballer & manager (born 1978)

Personal information
- Full name: Mauricio Ariel Caranta
- Date of birth: 31 July 1978 (age 48)
- Place of birth: Bell Ville, Argentina
- Height: 1.84 m (6 ft 0 in)
- Position: Goalkeeper

Senior career*
Years	Team	Apps	(Gls)
1999–2004	Instituto	135	(0)
2005–2006	Santos Laguna	47	(0)
2007–2008	Boca Juniors	55	(0)
2009–2012	Lanús	28	(0)
2012–2016	Rosario Central	118	(0)
2016–2021	Talleres	15	(0)
Total		398	(0)

Managerial career
- 2021: Instituto
- 2022–2023: Lanús (assistant)
- 2024: Talleres (assistant)
- * Club domestic league appearances and goals

Maurico Ariel Caranta (born 31 July 1978 in Bell Ville, Córdoba) is an Argentine football manager and former player who played as a goalkeeper.

== Career ==
Caranta started his career with Instituto de Córdoba in 1999. He helped Instituto to win the Primera B Nacional Apertura in the 2003–04 season and promotion to the Primera División at the end of the 2003–04 season. He made a total of 139 league appearances for Instituto.

In 2005, he moved to Mexican club Santos Laguna, where he made 47 league appearances before returning to Argentina to sign for Boca Juniors in 2007. He made his debut for Boca on 10 February 2007 in a 4–0 victory over Club Atlético Banfield. He was the first-choice goalkeeper in the 2007 Copa Libertadores as Boca won the competition, beating Brazilian club Grêmio in the final in June 2007. In December 2007 he played in the 2007 FIFA Club World Cup, in which Boca reached the final where they lost 4–2 to Italian club A.C. Milan at the Nissan Stadium, Yokohama, Japan on 16 December 2007.

In August 2008 he played in both legs of the 2008 Recopa Sudamericana final, which Boca won 5–3 on aggregate against Arsenal de Sarandí.

Following the completion of the Torneo Apertura 2008 team won the gold and blue, the conflict with his club's goalkeeper was aggravated because Caranta tried to leave the club and could not reach any agreement to be released or transferred. Finally, after much back and forth, on March 26, 2009, he signed for Lanús.

== Honours ==
Instituto

- Primera B Nacional: 1998–99, 2003–04

Boca Juniors

- Primera División: 2008 Apertura
- Copa Libertadores: 2007
- Recopa Sudamericana: 2008

Rosario Central

- Primera B Nacional: 2012–13

Talleres

- Primera B Nacional: 2016
