= 2007 FIFA Club World Cup final =

- Event: 2007 FIFA Club World Cup
Boca Juniors	Milan
(Argentina)	(Italy)
2	4
- Date: 16 December 2007
- Venue: Nissan Stadium; Yokohama, Japan
- Referee: Marco Rodríguez (Mexico)
- Attendance: 68,263
- Weather: Clear night 8 °C (46 °F); 33% humidity

The 2007 FIFA Club World Cup final took place at the Nissan Stadium, Yokohama, Japan on 16 December 2007.

The match pitted Boca Juniors of Argentina, the CONMEBOL club champions, against Milan of Italy, the UEFA club champions. Milan won 4–2 in a match watched by 68,263 people. In doing so, Milan became the first non-Brazilian team – and first European – to win the Club World Cup. They won their fourth FIFA Club World Cup/Intercontinental Cup which was a repeat of the 2003 Intercontinental Cup where Milan had lost to Boca Juniors. Milan also overtook Boca Juniors, Nacional, Peñarol, Real Madrid and São Paulo as the only team to have won the competition four times. Kaká was named as man of the match.

== Road to final ==
(Argentina) Boca Juniors	Team	(Italy) Milan
CONMEBOL	Confederation	UEFA
Winner of the 2007 Copa Libertadores	Qualification	Winner of the 2006–07 UEFA Champions League
Bye	Play-off round	Bye
Bye	Quarter-finals	Bye
1–0 (Tunisia) Étoile du Sahel	Semi-finals	1–0 (Japan) Urawa Red Diamonds

== Match ==
=== Details ===
16 December 2007
19:30 (UTC+9)

Boca Juniors (Argentina)	2–4	(Italy) Milan
Palacio 22'; Ledesma 85'	Report	Inzaghi 21', 71'; Nesta 50'; Kaká 61'

Nissan Stadium, Yokohama
Attendance: 68,263
Referee: Marco Rodríguez (Mexico)

Boca Juniors	Milan

GK	12	(Argentina) Mauricio Caranta
RB	4	(Argentina) Hugo Ibarra	(yellow card) 40'
CB	20	(Argentina) Jonatan Maidana
CB	29	(Argentina) Gabriel Paletta	(yellow card) 73'
LB	3	(Paraguay) Claudio Morel
DM	5	(Argentina) Sebastián Battaglia	(yellow card) 55'
RM	15	(Uruguay) Álvaro González		(substituted off) 67'
LM	24	(Argentina) Éver Banega
AM	19	(Argentina) Neri Cardozo		(substituted off) 68'
CF	14	(Argentina) Rodrigo Palacio
CF	9	(Argentina) Martín Palermo (c)
Substitutions:
MF	8	(Argentina) Pablo Ledesma	(red card) 88'	(substituted on) 67'
MF	11	(Argentina) Leandro Gracián		(substituted on) 68'
Manager
(Argentina) Miguel Ángel Russo

GK	1	(Brazil) Dida
RB	25	(Italy) Daniele Bonera
CB	13	(Italy) Alessandro Nesta
CB	4	(Georgia (country)) Kakha Kaladze	(red card) 77'
LB	3	(Italy) Paolo Maldini (c)
DM	21	(Italy) Andrea Pirlo
RM	8	(Italy) Gennaro Gattuso		(substituted off) 65'
CM	23	(Italy) Massimo Ambrosini	(yellow card) 22'
LM	10	(Netherlands) Clarence Seedorf		(substituted off) 87'
AM	22	(Brazil) Kaká	(yellow card) 62'
CF	9	(Italy) Filippo Inzaghi		(substituted off) 76'
Substitutions:
MF	5	(Brazil) Emerson		(substituted on) 65'
DF	2	(Brazil) Cafu		(substituted on) 76'
MF	32	(Italy) Cristian Brocchi		(substituted on) 87'
Manager
(Italy) Carlo Ancelotti

Assistant referees:
José Luis Camargo (Mexico)
Pedro Rebollar (Mexico)
Fourth official:
Mark Shield (Australia)

Match rules

- 90 minutes
- 30 minutes of extra time if necessary
- Penalty shoot-out if scores still level
- Twelve named substitutes, of which three may be used

=== Statistics ===
Overall
	Boca Juniors	Milan
Goals scored	2	4
Total shots	17	14
Shots on target	9	7
Ball possession	49%	51%
Corner kicks	5	2
Fouls committed	22	14
Offsides	4	3
Yellow cards	3	2
Red cards	1	1

== See also ==
- 2003 Intercontinental Cup – contested between same teams
- A.C. Milan in European football
