= Álvaro González (footballer, born 1984) =

Uruguayan footballer

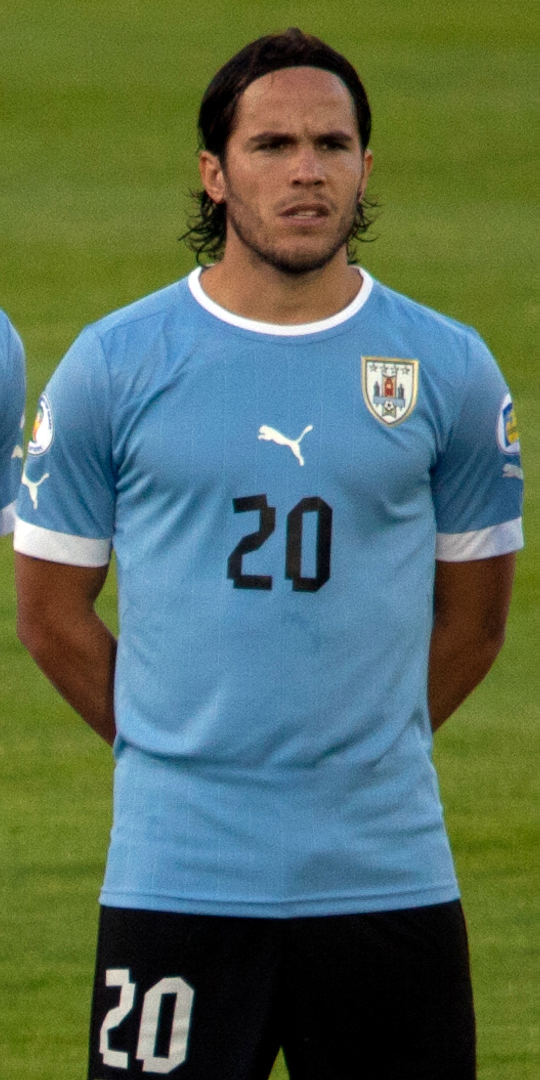
- González with Uruguay in 2011

Personal information
- Full name: Álvaro Rafael González Luengo
- Date of birth: 29 October 1984 (age 42)
- Place of birth: Montevideo, Uruguay
- Height: 1.76 m (5 ft 9 in)
- Position: Midfielder

Senior career*
Years	Team	Apps	(Gls)
2003–2007	Defensor Sporting	54	(5)
2007–2009	Boca Juniors	33	(1)
2009–2010	Nacional	15	(2)
2010–2017	Lazio	113	(4)
2015	→ Torino (loan)	4	(0)
2015–2016	→ Atlas (loan)	16	(0)
2017–2018	Nacional	29	(2)
2019–2021	Defensor Sporting	43	(3)
2022–2023	La Luz	36	(1)

International career
2006–2017	Uruguay	72	(3)
Medal record
Representing Uruguay
Copa América
Winner	2011 Argentina
- * Club domestic league appearances and goals as of 22 November 2020

Álvaro Rafael González Luengo (Spanish pronunciation: [ˈalβaɾo rafaˈel ɣonˈsales]; born 29 October 1984), nicknamed "Tata" is a former Uruguayan professional footballer who played as a midfielder. A Uruguayan international on 72 occasions since 2006, he represented his nation for one World Cup and three Copa América tournaments.

== Club career ==
=== Defensor ===
González started his career in 2003 with Defensor Sporting Club in Uruguay. He represented the side until 2007, playing 122 games with 8 goals in all competitions.

=== Boca Juniors ===
In August 2007, he was transferred to the giant club Boca Juniors. In the Argentine team he played until 2009 scoring one goal against Vélez Sarsfield and winning the 2008 Apertura and the 2008 Recopa Sudamericana.

=== Nacional ===
In 2009, he returned to Uruguay but now playing for Nacional.

=== Lazio ===
In August 2010, he signed a three-year contract with Italian club Lazio. He made his Serie A debut on 22 September 2010 against Fiorentina. Álvaro González scored his first Serie A goal vs Brescia and celebrated his goal by mimicking a phone call back to Uruguay by taking out his right boot.

The 2012–13 season saw González as a protagonist in Lazio coach Petković's eyes, where he had been among the most consistent and played players. Petković played González in numerous roles in the 2012–13 season, from defensive midfielder to full back and right midfielder. Together with the national team, Álvaro González played over 50 games in the 2012–13 season proving his durability, consistency and also goal scoring where he managed to get on the scoresheet in Serie A, Coppa Italia and in the Europa League.

==== Loan to Torino ====
On 1 February 2015, Torino announced the signing of González on a six-month loan with a buyout clause.

==== Loan to Atlas ====
On 21 August 2015, Mexican side Atlas announced the signing of González on a full year loan with a buyout clause.

== International career ==
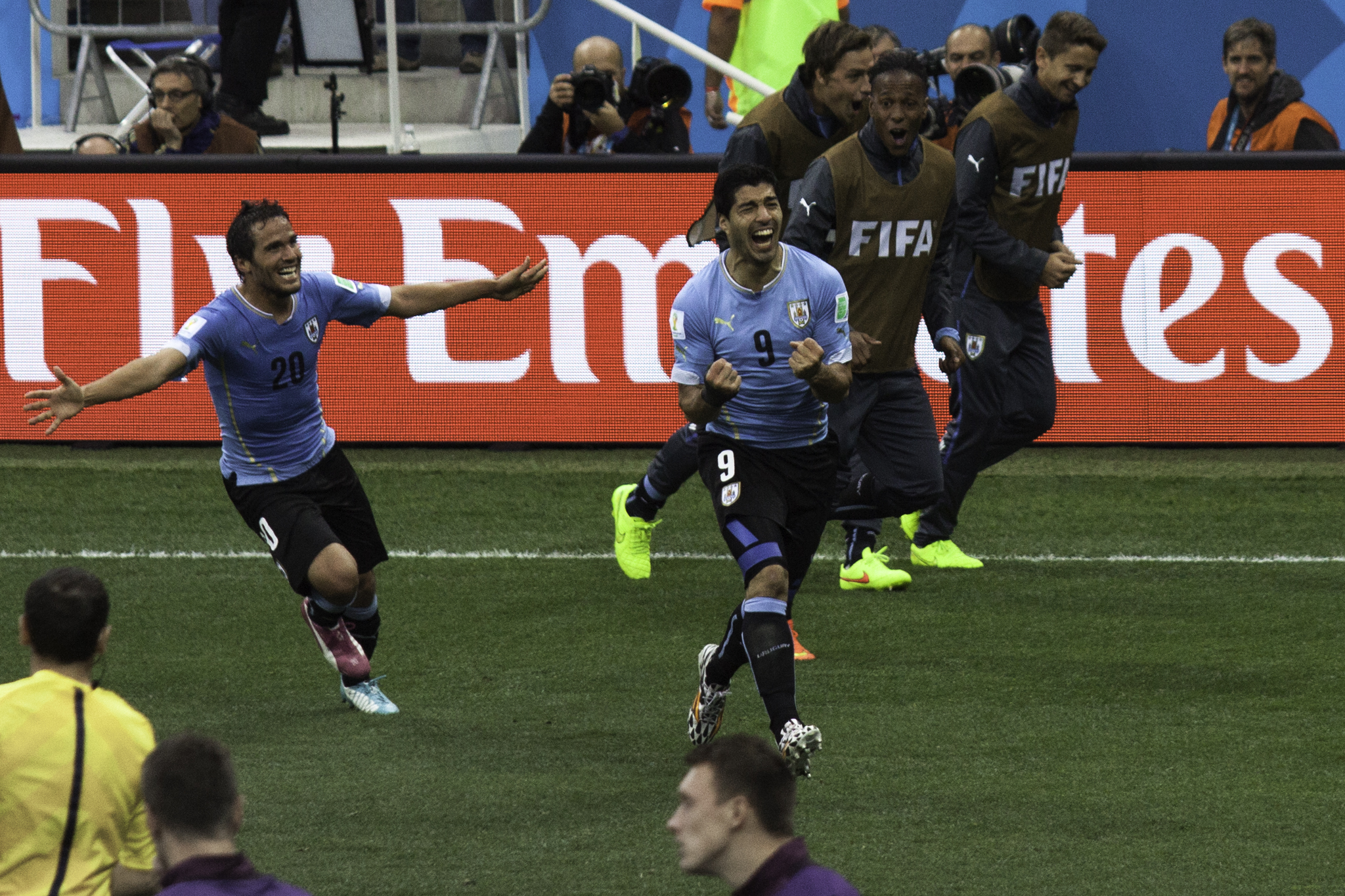
González (left) celebrating with Luis Suárez a goal against England at the 2014 FIFA World Cup

González has won 49 caps for the Uruguay national football team. His debut for La Celeste came against Romania in May 2006.

After playing for the team during 2010 FIFA World Cup qualifying, he was omitted from the squad which went on the finish fourth in the tournament finals.

In 2011, he won the Copa América playing four matches, including the final against Paraguay. He went on to represent his country at the 2013 FIFA Confederations Cup, and made 12 appearances during the 2014 FIFA World Cup qualifying campaign.

On 2 June 2014, he was named in Uruguay's squad for the 2014 FIFA World Cup finals. He appeared as a second-half substitute in the team's opening match – a 3–1 defeat to Costa Rica in Fortaleza.

== Career statistics ==
=== Club ===
Statistics accurate as of match played 1 October 2019.

Club	Season	League		Cup		CONMEBOL / UEFA		Other		Total	
Club	Season	Apps	Goals	Apps	Goals	Apps	Goals	Apps	Goals	Apps	Goals
Boca Juniors	2007–08	13	1	0	0	4	1	2	0	19	2
Boca Juniors	2008–09	20	0	0	0	5	1	0	0	25	1
Boca Juniors	Total Boca Juniors	33	1	0	0	9	2	2	0	44	3
Nacional	2009–10	15	2	0	0	8	0	0	0	23	2
S.S. Lazio	2010–11	19	1	3	1	0	0	0	0	22	2
S.S. Lazio	2011–12	31	1	2	0	7	0	0	0	40	1
S.S. Lazio	2012–13	34	1	4	1	11	1	0	0	49	3
S.S. Lazio	2013–14	25	1	1	0	4	0	0	0	30	1
S.S. Lazio	2014–15	4	0	1	0	0	0	0	0	5	0
S.S. Lazio	Total S.S. Lazio	113	4	11	2	22	1	0	0	146	7
Torino (loan)	2014–15	4	0	0	0	0	0	0	0	4	0
Atlas (loan)	2015–16	16	0	3	0	0	0	0	0	19	0
Nacional	2017	20	2	0	0	6	0	0	0	26	2
Nacional	2018	9	0	0	0	5	0	0	0	14	0
Nacional	Total Nacional	29	2	0	0	11	0	0	0	40	2
Defensor Sporting	2019	7	0	0	0	4	0	0	0	11	0
Career total		217	9	14	2	54	3	2	0	297	18

=== International ===
Appearances and goals by national team and year
National team	Year	Apps	Goals
Uruguay	2006	3	0
Uruguay	2007	3	0
Uruguay	2008	4	0
Uruguay	2009	1	0
Uruguay	2010	1	0
Uruguay	2011	10	1
Uruguay	2012	8	0
Uruguay	2013	11	1
Uruguay	2014	8	1
Uruguay	2015	11	0
Uruguay	2016	7	0
Uruguay	2017	5	0
Total		72	3

=== International goals ===
No.	Date	Venue	Opponent	Score	Result	Competition	Ref.
1	2 September 2011	Metalist Oblast Sports Complex, Kharkiv, Ukraine	Ukraine	1–1	2–3 (W)	Friendly	
2	14 August 2013	Miyagi Stadium, Rifu, Japan	Japan	4–1	4–2 (W)	Friendly	
3	18 November 2014	Estadio Monumental David Arellano, Santiago, Chile	Chile	2–1	2–1 (W)	Friendly	

== Honours ==
=== Club ===
Boca Juniors

- Primera División: 2008 Apertura
- Recopa Sudamericana: 2008

Lazio

- Coppa Italia: 2012–13

=== International ===
Uruguay

- 2011 Copa América: Winner
