= Ricardo Noir =

Argentine footballer

Personal information
- Full name: Ricardo Daniel Noir Meyer
- Date of birth: 26 February 1987 (age 39)
- Place of birth: Villa Elisa, Argentina
- Height: 1.73 m (5 ft 8 in)
- Position: Forward

Team information
- Current team: Paysandú FC

Youth career
- 2003–2008: Boca Juniors

Senior career*
Years	Team	Apps	(Gls)
2008–2013	Boca Juniors	33	(4)
2010	→ Barcelona SC (loan)	30	(6)
2011–2012	→ Newell's Old Boys (loan)	18	(2)
2012–2015	→ Banfield (loan)	85	(18)
2015–2020	Racing Club	24	(3)
2016–2017	→ Universidad Católica (loan)	25	(4)
2017–2018	→ Huracán (loan)	9	(0)
2018–2019	→ Atlético Tucumán (loan)	12	(1)
2019–2020	→ Belgrano (loan)	12	(2)
2020	San Martín T.	6	(1)
2021	Atlético Palmaflor	19	(3)
2022	Gimnasia Concepción	4	(0)
2022–	Paysandú FC		
- * Club domestic league appearances and goals as of 17:24, 22 June 2022 (UTC)

Ricardo Daniel Noir Meyer (born 26 February 1987 in Villa Elisa, Entre Ríos) is an Argentine footballer, who plays as a forward for Uruguayan club Paysandú FC.

== Career ==
Noir worked with his father before trialling for the Youth Divisions of Boca Juniors in 2003 and getting selected.

He made his professional debut on 17 May 2008 coming on as a substitute in a game against Racing Club, he scored the winning goal in the 5th minute of added time.

He played for Barcelona SC on a one-year loan from Boca Juniors for 2010 season.

On 4 July 2019, Noir joined Club Atlético Belgrano.

== Honours ==
=== Club ===
Boca Juniors

- Recopa Sudamericana: 1

2008

- Argentine Primera División: 1

2008 Apertura

Universidad Catolica

- Chilean Primera División: 1

2016-2017 Apertura

- Supercopa de Chile: 1

2016
