= Lucas Viatri =

Argentine footballer

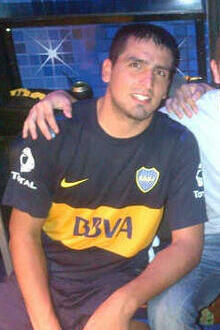
- Viatri in 2014

Personal information
- Full name: Lucas Ezequiel Viatri
- Date of birth: 29 March 1987 (age 39)
- Place of birth: Buenos Aires, Argentina
- Height: 1.87 m (6 ft 2 in)
- Position: Striker

Youth career
- Boca Juniors

Senior career*
Years	Team	Apps	(Gls)
2007–2014	Boca Juniors	131	(31)
2007	→ Emelec (loan)	0	(0)
2007	→ Maracaibo (loan)	12	(2)
2013–2014	→ Chiapas (loan)	30	(9)
2014–2015	Shanghai Shenhua	12	(4)
2015	→ Banfield (loan)	24	(4)
2016–2017	Estudiantes	25	(12)
2017–2019	Peñarol	69	(18)
2020–2021	Colón	6	(0)
2021	Deportivo Maldonado	9	(4)
2022	Peñarol	27	(3)
Total		329	(82)

International career
2010	Argentina	3	(0)
- * Club domestic league appearances and goals

Lucas Ezequiel Viatri (Spanish pronunciation: [ˈlukas ˈβjatɾi]; (Note: In isolation, Viatri is pronounced [ˈbjatɾi].) born 29 March 1987) is an Argentine former footballer who played as a striker. He was capped three times for Argentina.

== Career ==
Viatri started his playing career with loan spells with Emelec of Ecuador and Unión Atlético Maracaibo of Venezuela. He returned to Boca Juniors in 2008.

On 17 May 2008, Viatri made his debut with Boca in a game 2–1 victory over Racing Club. In August 2008 he was part of the squad that won the 2008 Recopa Sudamericana. Subsequently, during the Apertura 2008 he was a regular on the first team and helped them get the championship title by scoring 8 goals, one of them at the Superclásico.

On 2 July 2014, Viatri transferred to Chinese Super League side Shanghai Shenhua. On July 15, 2014, Viatri made his debut with Shanghai Shenhua in a China FA Cup game against Chongqing Lifan, he scored twice and made an assist to help the super league side won 3–0. Six days later, Viatri scored twice again to let Shenhua won 3–2 against Liaoning Whowin in a Chinese Super League game.

On 11 August 2017 Lucas was acquired by Peñarol.

== International career ==
=== International appearances and goals ===
#	Date	Venue	Opponent	Final score	Goal	Result	Competition
3.	September 28, 2011	Belém, Brazil	Brazil	2–0	0	Lost	2011 Roca Cup.

== Criminal charge ==
In 2008, before his Boca Juniors debut, Viatri was detained for 30 days, accused of committing an armed robbery to a hairdressing salon. Viatri was processed and subject to an oral proceeding. In the proceeding, the footballer agreed to a probation, and therefore was never sentenced guilty for the crime.

In 2009, the court that dealt with his case sentenced that he could not move outside Argentina before his probation finished, therefore thwarting his possibilities of transferring outside the country.

== Career statistics ==
Appearances and goals by club, season and competition
Club	Season	League			Cup		Continental		Other		Total	
Club	Season	Division	Apps	Goals	Apps	Goals	Apps	Goals	Apps	Goals	Apps	Goals
Boca Juniors	2007–08	Argentine Primera División	2	1	0	0	1	0	1	0	4	1
Boca Juniors	2008–09	Argentine Primera División	28	9	0	0	5	0	—		33	9
Boca Juniors	2009–10	Argentine Primera División	22	4	0	0	—		—		22	4
Boca Juniors	2010–11	Argentine Primera División	28	7	0	0	—		—		28	7
Boca Juniors	2011–12	Argentine Primera División	15	4	2	1	3	0	—		20	5
Boca Juniors	2012–13	Argentine Primera División	18	4	1	1	7	0	—		26	5
Boca Juniors	Total		113	29	3	2	16	0	1	0	133	31
Emelec (loan)	2007	Ecuadorian Serie A	4	0	—		4	0	—		8	0
Maracaibo (loan)	2007–08	Venezuelan Primera División	12	2	—		—		—		12	2
Chiapas (loan)	2013–14	Liga MX	30	9	3	0	—		—		33	9
Shanghai Greenland Shenhua	2014	Chinese Super League	12	4	5	2	—		—		17	6
Banfield (loan)	2015	Argentine Primera División	24	4	1	0	—		—		25	4
Estudiantes	2016	Argentine Primera División	13	5	3	1	2	0	—		18	6
Estudiantes	2016–17	Argentine Primera División	23	8	—		3	0	—		26	8
Estudiantes	Total		36	13	3	1	5	0	—		44	14
Peñarol	2017	Uruguayan Primera División	16	4	—		—		—		16	4
Peñarol	2018	Uruguayan Primera División	12	3	—		1	0	0	0	13	3
Peñarol	2019	Uruguayan Primera División	28	7	—		10	4	1	0	39	11
Peñarol	Total		56	14	—		11	4	1	0	68	18
Colón	2019–20	Argentine Primera División	6	0	1	0	—		—		7	0
Deportivo Maldonado	2021	Uruguayan Primera División	9	4	—		—		—		9	4
Peñarol	2022	Uruguayan Primera División	27	3	3	0	5	0	—		35	3
Career total			329	82	19	5	41	4	2	0	391	91

== Honours ==
Boca Juniors

- Primera División: 2008 Apertura, 2011 Apertura
- Copa Argentina: 2011–12
- Recopa Sudamericana: 2008

Peñarol

- Uruguayan Primera División: 2017, 2018
- Supercopa Uruguaya: 2018
