= Gabriel Favale =

Argentine football referee

- Full name: Gabriel Norberto Favale
- Born: 19 July 1967 (age 59); Tigre, Argentina

Domestic
Years	League	Role
2000–2012	Primera División	Referee
2005–2012	Primera Nacional	Referee

International
Years	League	Role
2004–2011	CONMEBOL	Referee
2005–2010	FIFA	Referee

Gabriel Norberto Favale (born 19 July 1967) is a retired football referee from Argentina.

Favale has supervised matches in the Argentine first division and received his international FIFA badge in 2004. He has refereed matches in the Copa Libertadores (2006, 2007 and 2008).
