= Cristian Chávez (footballer, born 1986) =

Argentine footballer

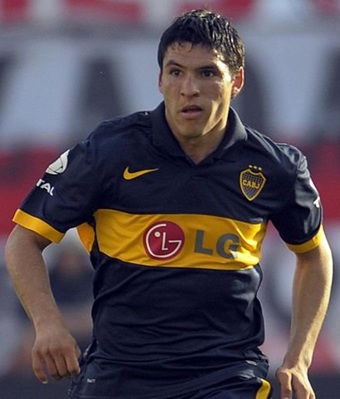
- Chávez with Boca Juniors in 2009

Personal information
- Full name: Cristian Manuel Chávez
- Date of birth: 16 June 1986 (age 40)
- Place of birth: Pilar, Argentina
- Height: 1.68 m (5 ft 6 in)
- Positions: Attacking midfielder; winger

Youth career
- Atlas
- Boca Juniors

Senior career*
Years	Team	Apps	(Gls)
2005–2013	Boca Juniors	132	(11)
2013–2016	Lanús	25	(1)
2014–2015	→ Unión Española (loan)	28	(0)
2015–2016	→ Arsenal de Sarandí (loan)	11	(0)
2016–2017	Asteras Tripolis	7	(0)
2017–2022	Wilstermann	150	(31)
2025	Wilstermann	5	(0)
Total		353	(43)

International career
2010	Argentina	4	(1)

Managerial career
- 2025: Wilstermann (reserves)
- 2025: Wilstermann (interim)
- 2025: Wilstermann
- * Club domestic league appearances and goals

Cristian Manuel Chávez (born 16 June 1986) is an Argentine footballer who plays as a midfielder for Bolivian club Jorge Wilstermann. He retired in 2022 and went on to become a manager, before returning to playing duties in 2025.

== Club career ==
Born in Pilar, Buenos Aires, Chávez made his competitive debut for Boca Juniors on 3 July 2005 in a fiery game against Almagro, which was suspended due to violence and recorded as a defeat for both teams. On 27 January 2016, he signed a year and a half contract to Greek club Asteras Tripolis playing for Super League Greece for an undisclosed fee.

His last club was Bolivian club Jorge Wilstermann from 2017 to 2022. He announced his retirement in September 2023.

=== Achievements ===
Boca Juniors

- Primera División: 2008 Apertura, 2011 Apertura
- Recopa Sudamericana: 2008

Lanús

- Copa Sudamericana: 2013

Wilstermann

- Primera División: 2018 Apertura, 2019 Clausura

== International career ==
=== International goals ===
Scores and results list Argentina's goal tally first.

#	Date	Venue	Opponent	Score	Result	Competition
1.	16 March 2011	Estadio del Bicentenario, San Juan, Argentina	Venezuela	1–0	4–1	Friendly
