= Matías Alasia =

Argentine footballer (born 1985)

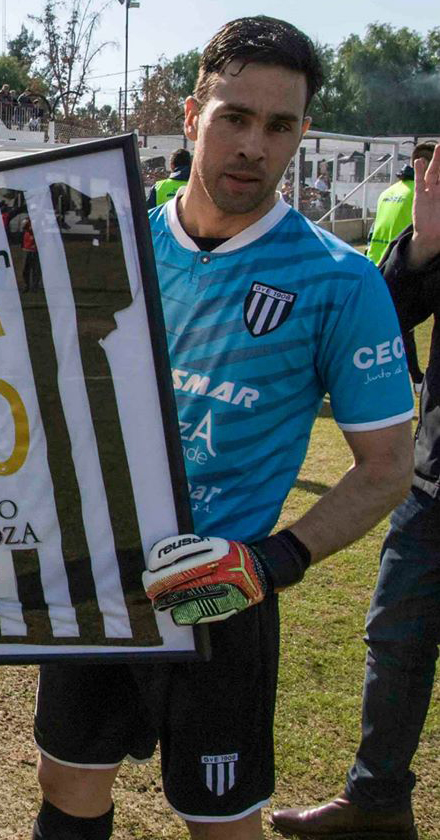
- Alasia with Gimnasia de Mendoza in 2015

Personal information
- Full name: Matías Ricardo Alasia
- Date of birth: 7 May 1985 (age 41)
- Place of birth: Corral de Bustos, Argentina
- Height: 1.80 m (5 ft 11 in)
- Position: Goalkeeper

Youth career
- 1999–2007: Newell's Old Boys

Senior career*
Years	Team	Apps	(Gls)
2007–2010	Newell's Old Boys	0	(0)
2007–2008	→ Tiro Federal (loan)	0	(0)
2008–2009	→ Arsenal de Sarandí (loan)	0	(0)
2009–2010	→ Real Arroyo Seco (loan)	29	(0)
2011–2012	Coquimbo Unido	13	(0)
2013–2016	Gimnasia de Mendoza	125	(0)
2016–2018	Cipolletti	54	(0)
2018–2019	Juventud Unida Universitario	19	(0)
2018–2021	Deportivo Maipú	32	(0)
Total		272	(0)
- * Club domestic league appearances and goals

Matías Ricardo Alasia (born 7 May 1985) is an Argentine former football goalkeeper.

== Career ==
Alasia came to the Newell's Old Boys youth system at the age of fourteen and was a member of the first team before being loaned out to Tiro Federal, Arsenal de Sarandí and Real Arroyo Seco.

After ending his contract with Newell's old Boys, Alasia moved to Chile and signed with Coquimbo Unido in 2011, then member Primera B de Chile (second-tier). On 3 November of the same year, he suffered a serious skull fracture in a match against Deportes Antofagasta, returning to play in September 2012.

Back in Argentina, Alasia joined Gimnasia y Esgrima de Mendoza in 2013. He is best known for his heroics in saving two penalties during Gimnasia de Mendoza's 2014 Torneo Federal A promotion playoff victory over Talleres de Córdoba.

He after played for Cipolletti, Juventud Unida Universitario and Deportivo Maipú, his last club.
