= 2005–06 in Argentine football =

Football in Argentina
- Season: 2005–06

The 2005–06 Argentine First Division Apertura was a nail biter. After a head-to-head finish in the last weeks Boca Juniors took the trophy home. Gimnasia de La Plata will have to wait for their first-ever championship. The 2005–06 Argentine First Division Clausura saw Boca Juniors become the first team since River Plate in 1999–2000 to win the Apertura and the Clausura in the same season. This capped an amazing year for Boca, as they won every tournament they were eligible (they were not eligible for the Copa Libertadores after a dismal Clausura last season). Lanús were the big surprise of the Clausura, as they finished second in the league. Boca also achieved 80 points in a season for the first time since 1998/99 when they scored 89 points.

Argentina drew one of the most difficult groups in the 2006 FIFA World Cup, advanced to the second round but lost against hosts Germany in the quarter-finals.

After an abysmal season, Instituto and Tiro Federal were relegated to the Nacional B Division a few weeks before the end of the tournament. The next two worst teams in the relegation standings, Argentinos Juniors and Olimpo de Bahía Blanca, played a Promoción playoff (home and away) series against Huracán and Belgrano de Córdoba, respectively, for two spots in next year's Argentine First Division. Argentinos Juniors remains in the top category after drawing with Huracán twice. Olimpo, however, were relegated to Nacional B after losing twice to Belgrano.

== Torneo Apertura ("Opening" Tournament) ==
Position	Team	Points	Played	Won	Drawn	Lost	For	Against	Difference
1	Boca Juniors	40	19	12	4	3	36	17	19
2	Gimnasia de La Plata	37	19	11	4	4	28	19	9
3	Vélez Sársfield	33	19	10	3	6	26	16	10
4	Independiente	32	19	8	8	3	34	22	12
5	Banfield	28	19	5	13	1	25	15	10
6	River Plate	28	19	8	4	7	31	22	9
7	Estudiantes La Plata	28	19	8	4	7	23	22	1
8	Argentinos Juniors	28	19	8	4	7	19	20	-1
9	San Lorenzo	28	19	8	4	7	33	39	-6
10	Colón de Santa Fe	26	19	7	5	7	28	27	1
11	Racing Club	25	19	7	4	8	28	27	1
12	Olimpo de Bahía Blanca	23	19	5	8	6	19	23	-4
13	Lanús	23	19	5	8	6	21	31	-10
14	Arsenal de Sarandí	22	19	5	7	7	23	24	-1
15	Rosario Central	22	19	5	7	7	20	29	-9
16	Newell's Old Boys	20	19	5	5	9	25	27	-2
17	Quilmes	19	19	4	7	8	20	27	-7
18	Gimnasia de Jujuy	18	19	3	9	7	23	30	-7
19	Tiro Federal	15	19	4	3	12	22	31	-9
20	Instituto	15	19	2	9	8	11	27	-16

=== Top Scorers ===
Position	Player	Team	Goals
1	Javier Cámpora	Tiro Federal	13
2	Leonardo Pisculichi	Argentinos Juniors	10
2	Rodrigo Palacio	Boca Juniors	10
2	Gonzalo Vargas	Gimnasia de La Plata	10
2	José Luis Calderón	Estudiantes de La Plata	10
3	Nicolás Frutos	Independiente	9
3	Sergio Agüero	Independiente	9
3	Iván Moreno y Fabianesi	Colón de Santa Fe	9
4	Ezequiel Lavezzi	San Lorenzo	8

=== Relegation ===
There is no relegation after the Apertura. For the relegation results of this tournament see below.

== Torneo Clausura ("Closing" Tournament) ==
Position	Team	Points	Played	Won	Drawn	Lost	For	Against	Difference
1	Boca Juniors	43	19	13	4	2	37	14	23
2	Lanús	35	19	10	5	4	26	15	11
3	River Plate	34	19	9	7	3	39	24	15
4	Gimnasia de Jujuy	33	19	10	3	6	26	16	10
5	Gimnasia de La Plata	32	19	9	5	5	31	22	9
6	Newell's Old Boys	31	19	8	7	4	27	18	9
7	Banfield	31	19	10	1	8	28	22	6
8	San Lorenzo	28	19	7	7	5	15	14	1
9	Olimpo	26	19	7	5	7	22	22	0
10	Vélez Sársfield	25	19	5	10	4	21	18	3
11	Estudiantes La Plata	24	19	6	6	7	25	31	-6
12	Independiente	23	19	6	5	8	18	18	0
13	Rosario Central	23	19	5	8	6	15	17	-2
14	Argentinos Juniors	22	19	5	7	7	26	28	-2
15	Arsenal de Sarandí	22	19	5	7	7	17	20	-3
16	Colón de Santa Fe	20	19	5	5	9	19	26	-7
17	Quilmes	20	19	5	5	9	11	28	-17
18	Racing Club	19	19	5	4	10	14	24	-10
19	Instituto	13	19	3	4	12	16	37	-21
20	Tiro Federal	12	19	3	3	13	15	39	-24

=== Top Scorers ===
Position	Player	Team	Goals
1	Gonzalo Vargas	Gimnasia de La Plata	12
2	Ernesto Farías	River Plate	11
2	Martín Palermo	Boca Juniors	11
3	Ignacio Scocco	Newell's Old Boys	9
3	Sergio Agüero	Independiente	9
4	Silvio Carrario	Quilmes	7
4	Ezequiel Maggiolo	Olimpo de Bahia Blanca	7
4	Rodrigo Palacio	Boca Juniors	7

=== Relegation ===
Team	Average	Points	Played	2003-04	2004-05	2005-06
Boca Juniors	1.807	206	114	75/38	48/38	83/37
River Plate	1.649	188	114	66/38	60/38	62/37
Vélez Sársfield	1.614	184	114	53/38	73/38	58/38
Banfield	1.596	182	114	64/38	59/38	59/38
San Lorenzo	1.491	170	114	62/38	52/38	56/38
Newell's Old Boys	1.421	162	114	51/38	60/38	51/38
Gimnasia de La Plata	1.412	161	114	38/38	54/38	69/38
Estudiantes de La Plata	1.377	157	114	44/38	61/38	52/38
Lanús	1.351	154	114	42/38	54/38	58/38
Arsenal de Sarandí	1.342	153	114	55/38	54/38	43/38
Gimnasia de Jujuy	1.342	51	38	N/A	N/A	51/38
Racing Club	1.333	152	114	50/38	58/38	44/38
Rosario Central	1.316	150	114	44/38	61/38	45/38
Independiente	1.298	148	114	44/38	49/38	55/38
Colón de Santa Fe	1.298	148	114	49/38	53/38	46/38
Quilmes	1.265	143	114	60/38	44/38	39/38
Argentinos Juniors	1.224	93	76	N/A	43/38	50/38
Olimpo de Bahía Blanca	1.149	131	114	39/38	43/38	49/38
Instituto	0.921	70	76	N/A	42/38	28/38
Tiro Federal	0.711	27	38	N/A	N/A	27/38

==== "Promoción" playoff ====
Date	Home	Away	Result
May 31, 2006	Huracán	Argentinos Juniors	1 - 1
June 4, 2006	Argentinos Juniors	Huracán	2 - 2

Argentinos Juniors remains in the Argentine First Division after a 3 - 3 aggregate tie by virtue of a "sports advantage". In case of a tie in goals, the team from the First Division gets to stay in it.

Date	Home	Away	Result
May 31, 2006	Belgrano de Córdoba	Olimpo de Bahia Blanca	2 - 1
June 4, 2006	Olimpo de Bahia Blanca	Belgrano de Córdoba	1 - 2

Belgrano de Córdoba wins 4-2 and is promoted to Argentine First Division. Olimpo de Bahia Blanca is relegated to the Argentine Nacional B.

== Lower leagues ==
Level	Tournament	Champion
2nd	Primera B Nacional Apertura; Primera B Nacional Clausura	Godoy Cruz; Nueva Chicago
3rd	Primera B Metropolitana	Platense
3rd (Interior)	Torneo Argentino A	Villa Mitre
4th	Primera C Metropolitana	Deportivo Merlo
5th	Primera D Metropolitana	Ituzaingó

== Clubs in international competitions ==
Team / Competition	2005 Recopa Sudamericana	2005 Copa Sudamericana	2006 Copa Libertadores
Boca Juniors	Champions defeated (Colombia) Once Caldas	Champions defeated (Mexico) UNAM	did not qualify
Vélez Sársfield	Did not play	Semifinal eliminated by (Mexico) UNAM	Quarterfinals eliminated by (Mexico) Guadalajara
Estudiantes de La Plata	Did not play	First stage eliminated by (Argentina) Banfield	Quarterfinals eliminated by (Brazil) São Paulo
River Plate	Did not play	Round of 16 eliminated by (Brazil) Corinthians	Quarterfinals eliminated by (Paraguay) Libertad
Newell's Old Boys	Did not play	First stage eliminated by (Argentina) Rosario Central	Round of 16 eliminated by (Argentina) Vélez Sársfield
Rosario Central	Did not play	Round of 16 eliminated by (Brazil) Internacional	Group Stage eliminated (finished last in the group)

== National team ==
This section covers Argentina's matches from August 1, 2005, to July 31, 2006.

Win Draw Loss

=== Friendly matches ===
August 17, 2005	Hungary	1 – 2	Argentina	Budapest, Hungary
17:30 UTC+01	Torghelle 29'	(Report)	Rodríguez 17'; Heinze 63'	Stadium: Stadium Puskás Ferenc

November 12, 2005	England	3 – 2	Argentina	Geneva, Switzerland
	Rooney 39'; Owen 86', 90+2'	(Report)	Crespo 35'; Ayala 54'	Stadium: Stade de Genève; Attendance: 29,000; Referee: Philippe Leuba (Switzerland)

November 16, 2005	Qatar	0 – 3	Argentina	Doha, Qatar
17:30 UTC+03		(Report)	Riquelme 70'; Ayala 73'; Cruz 73'	Stadium: Khalifa International Stadium; Referee: Philippe Leuba (Switzerland)

March 1, 2006	Croatia	3 – 2	Argentina	Basel, Switzerland
21:15 UTC+01	Klasnić 3'; Srna 52'; Šimić 90+2'	(Report)	Tevez 4'; Messi 6'	Stadium: St. Jakob-Park; Attendance: 13,138; Referee: Markus Nobs (Switzerland)

May 30, 2006	Argentina	2 – 0	Angola	Salerno, Italy
21:00 UTC+01	Rodríguez 28'; Sorín 36'	(Report)		Stadium: Stadio Arechi; Attendance: 4,000; Referee: Stefano Farina (Italy)

=== 2006 World Cup qualifiers ===
September 3, 2005 Round 16	Paraguay	1 – 0	Argentina	Asunción, Paraguay
17:00 UTC-04	Santa Cruz 14'	(Report)		Stadium: Estadio Defensores del Chaco; Attendance: 32,000; Referee: Carlos Eugênio Simon (Brazil)

October 9, 2005 Round 17	Argentina	2 – 0	Peru	Buenos Aires, Argentina
19:10 UTC-04	Riquelme 81' (pen.); Guadalupe 90' (o.g.)	(Report)		Stadium: Estadio Antonio V. Liberti; Attendance: 36,977; Referee: Carlos Torres (Paraguay)

October 12, 2005 Round 18	Uruguay	1 – 0	Argentina	Montevideo, Uruguay
22:30 UTC-03	Recoba 46'	(Report)		Stadium: Estadio Centenario; Attendance: 55,000; Referee: Wilson de Souza (Brazil)

=== 2006 World Cup ===
June 10, 2006 Group stage	Argentina	2 – 1	Ivory Coast	Hamburg, Germany
21:00 UTC+01	Crespo 24'; Saviola 38'	(Report)	Drogba 82'	Stadium: FIFA WM Stadion Hamburg; Attendance: 49,480; Referee: Frank De Bleeckere (Belgium)

June 16, 2006 Group stage	Argentina	6 – 0	Serbia and Montenegro	Gelsenkirchen, Germany
15:00 UTC+01	Rodríguez 6', 41'; Cambiasso 31'; Crespo 78'; Tevez 84'; Messi 88'	(Report)		Stadium: FIFA WM Stadion Gelsenkirchen; Attendance: 52,000; Referee: Roberto Rosetti (Italy)

June 21, 2006 Group stage	Netherlands	0 – 0	Argentina	Frankfurt, Germany
21:00 UTC+01		(Report)		Stadium: FIFA WM Stadion Frankfurt; Attendance: 48,000; Referee: Luis Medina Cantalejo (Spain)

June 24, 2006 Round of 16	Argentina	2 – 1 (a.e.t.)	Mexico	Leipzig, Germany
21:00 UTC+01	Crespo 10'; Rodríguez 98'	(Report)	Márquez 6'	Stadium: Zentralstadion; Attendance: 43,000; Referee: Massimo Busacca (Switzerland)

June 30, 2006 Quarter-finals	Germany	1 – 1 (a.e.t.) (4 – 2 p)	Argentina	Berlin, Germany
17:00 UTC+01	Klose 80'	(Report)	Ayala 49'	Stadium: Olympiastadion; Attendance: 72,000; Referee: Ľuboš Micheľ (Slovakia)
	Penalties
	Neuville (penalty scored); Ballack (penalty scored); Podolski (penalty scored); Borowski (penalty scored)		(penalty scored) Cruz; (penalty missed) Ayala; (penalty scored) Rodríguez; (penalty missed) Cambiasso
