= Carlos Báez (footballer, born 1982) =

Paraguayan-Spanish footballer

Personal information
- Full name: Carlos Alberto Báez Appleyard
- Date of birth: 12 June 1982 (age 44)
- Place of birth: Salamanca, Spain
- Height: 1.83 m (6 ft 0 in)
- Position: Defender

Youth career
- Cerro Porteño

Senior career*
Years	Team	Apps	(Gls)
2003–2006	Cerro Porteño	86	(3)
2006–2010	Independiente	21	(0)
2008	→ Arsenal de Sarandí (loan)	17	(0)
2009	→ Cerro Porteño (loan)	10	(0)
2010	→ Cúcuta Deportivo (loan)	21	(1)
2011	O'Higgins	8	(0)
- * Club domestic league appearances and goals

Carlos Alberto Báez Appleyard (born 12 June 1982 in Asunción, Paraguay) is a Spanish-born Paraguayan former football defender.

== Teams ==
- (Paraguay) Cerro Porteño 2003–2006
- (Argentina) Independiente 2007
- (Argentina) Arsenal de Sarandí 2008
- (Paraguay) Cerro Porteño 2009
- (Colombia) Cúcuta Deportivo 2010
- (Chile) O'Higgins 2011

== Personal life ==
Báez was born in Salamanca, Spain, when his father, Carlos Sr., played for UD Salamanca.

Báez is nicknamed Aquiles.

Báez has a merch shop about Cerro Porteño in Asunción.
