= Carlos Ischia =

Argentine footballer and manager

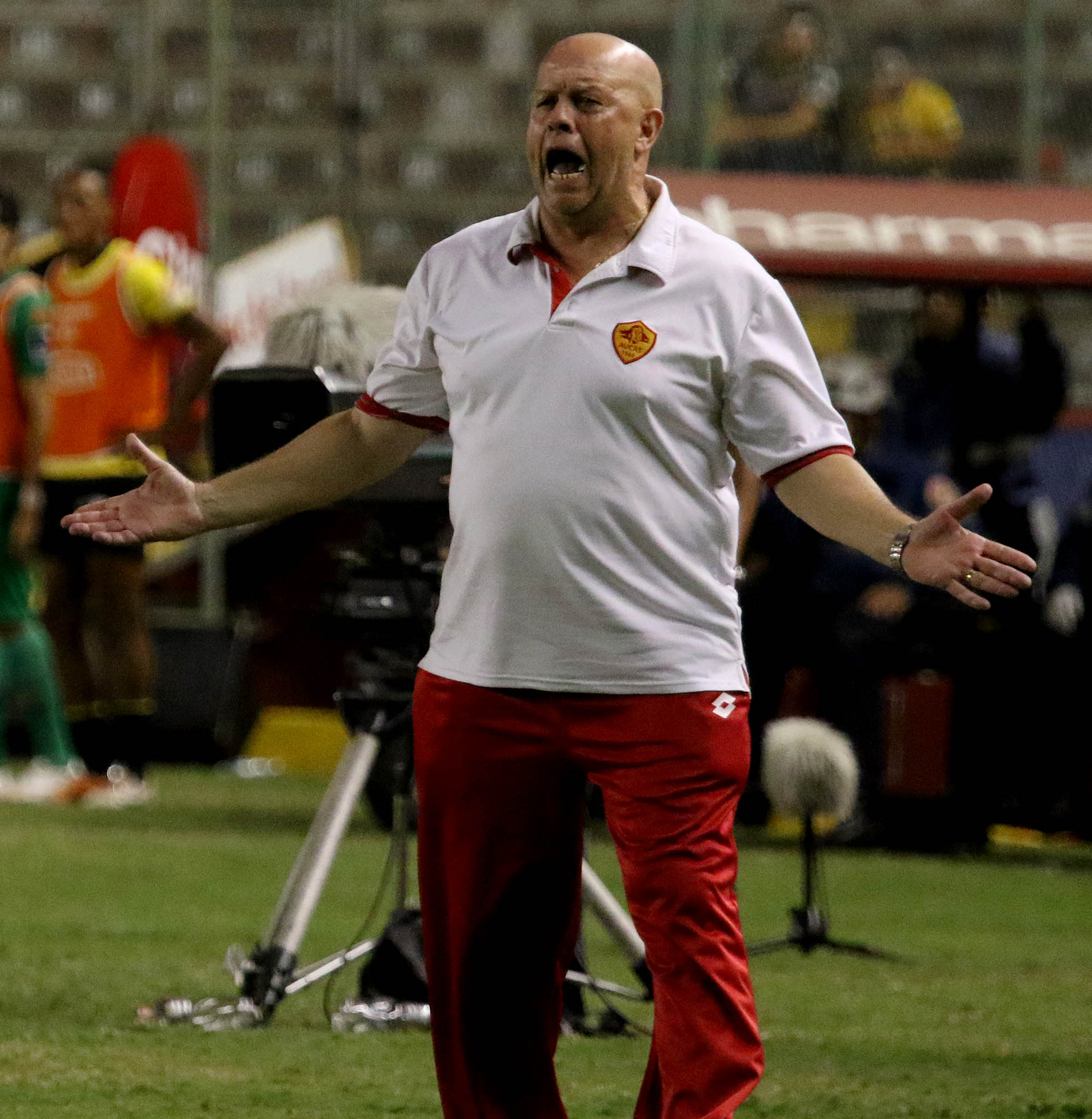
- Ischia as a coach of Aucas in 2015

Personal information
- Full name: Carlos Luis Ischia
- Date of birth: 28 October 1956 (age 70)
- Place of birth: Buenos Aires, Argentina
- Position: Defender

Senior career*
Years	Team	Apps	(Gls)
1975–1979	Chacarita Juniors	138	(17)
1979–1984	Vélez Sársfield	220	(29)
1984–1985	Junior	95	(6)
1986	América de Cali	31	(3)
1987–1989	Junior	62	(3)

International career
- Argentina

Managerial career
- 2002–2004: Vélez Sársfield
- 2004–2005: Gimnasia de La Plata
- 2005: Junior
- 2007: Rosario Central
- 2008–2009: Boca Juniors
- 2009–2010: Atlas
- 2011–2012: Deportivo Quito
- 2013: Racing Club
- 2014: Barcelona
- 2015–2016: Aucas
- 2018: The Strongest
- 2020: Delfín
- 2023: Deportivo Cuenca
- * Club domestic league appearances and goals

Carlos Luis Ischia (born 28 October 1956) is an Argentine football manager and former player who played as a defender.

== Playing career ==
Born in Buenos Aires, Ischia played for Chacarita Juniors and Vélez Sársfield in Argentina as well as representing the Argentina national football team.

In 1984, Ischia moved to Colombia, where he played for Junior and América de Cali. He retired in 1989 due to injury.

== Managerial career ==
Ischia was field assistant for Carlos Bianchi at Vélez Sársfield and Boca Juniors before becoming first team coach at Vélez.

In 2004, Ischia was appointed as manager of Gimnasia de La Plata. In 2005, he took over at Junior in Colombia, but left later that year due to differences with the directors and constant media pressure. In 2007, he was appointed the new manager of struggling Rosario Central, but after 14 games of the Apertura 2007 Ischia resigned from the club at the bottom of the table and perilously close to the automatic relegation places.

In December 2007, Ischia was appointed as the new manager of Boca Juniors after the resignation of Miguel Ángel Russo. On 23 December 2008, his team managed to avoid a two-goal defeat against Club Atlético Tigre to win the Apertura 2008 championship. On 27 May 2009 Boca Juniors announced that Ischia would quit as manager at the end of the Clausura 2009 tournament, he was replaced by Alfio Basile. He replaced Ricardo Lavolpe on 1 January 2010 to become the head coach of Mexican club Club Atlas. In mid-2011, Ischia became the new manager of Deportivo Quito, making his debut in Ecuadorian football. He held this post until 14 May 2012.

In August 2013, Ischia was back coaching in Argentina, taking charge of Racing Club, replacing newly sacked head coach Luis Zubeldía.

In 2014, Ischia was named as the new coach of Barcelona Sporting Club.

== Honours ==
Boca Juniors

- Argentine Primera División: Apertura 2008
- Recopa Sudamericana: 2008

Deportivo Quito

- Ecuadorian Serie A: 2011
