= 2008–09 Argentine Primera División season =

118th season of top-tier football league in Argentina

Primera División
- Season: 2008–09
- Champions: Apertura: Boca Juniors (29th title); Clausura: Vélez Sarsfield (7th title)
- Relegated: Gimnasia y Esgrima (J); San Martín (T)
- 2009 Copa Libertadores: Boca Juniors; San Lorenzo; Estudiantes (LP)
- 2010 Copa Libertadores: Vélez Sarsfield
- 2009 Copa Sudamericana: Lanús; Vélez Sarsfield; San Lorenzo; Tigre
- Top goalscorer: Apertura: José Sand (15 goals); Clausura: José Sand (13 goals); Season: José Sand (28 goals)

The 2008-09 Primera División season was the 118th season of top-flight professional football in Argentina and the nineteenth season in which the Apertura and Clausura system is used.

Boca Juniors won the Apertura championship for their 29th national title after a three team playoff with Tigre and San Lorenzo. The Clausura championship was won by Vélez Sársfield for their 7th national title. Gimnasia y Esgrima (J) and San Martín (T) were relegated to the Primera B Nacional.

== Format ==
The format for the 2008-09 season remained unchanged. The season was split into two tournaments called Apertura and Clausura. Each tournament was contested by the same 20 teams in a single round-robin format. The champions of each tournament is determined by points. If the tops teams would be tied at points at the end of each tournament, a playoff would be held at a neutral site. Relegation was determined at the end of the season.

== Club information ==
Locations of the 2009−10 Primera División teams outside Greater Buenos Aires
Locations of the 2009−10 Primera División teams within Greater Buenos Aires

=== Promotion and relegation ===
Olimpo and San Martín (SJ) were relegated at the end of the 2007–08 Primera División season. They were replaced by Godoy Cruz and San Martín (T), both of whom were promoted from the Primera B Nacional.

Gimnasia y Esgrima (J) and Racing played the relegation/promotion playoffs against Unión and Belgrano, respectively. Both Gimnasia and Esgrima (J) and Racing won their playoff matches and retained their status in top-flight football.

Club	City	Stadium	Capacity
Argentinos Juniors	Buenos Aires	Diego Armando Maradona	24,800
Arsenal	Sarandí	Julio H. Grondona	16,300
Banfield	Banfield	Florencio Sola	40,500
Boca Juniors	Buenos Aires	Alberto J. Armando	49,000
Colón	Santa Fe	Brigadier General Estanislao López	32,500
Estudiantes (LP)	La Plata	Jorge Luis Hirschi	23,000
Gimnasia y Esgrima (J)	San Salvador de Jujuy	23 de Agosto	24,000
Gimnasia y Esgrima (LP)	La Plata	Juan Carlos Zerillo	24,544
Godoy Cruz	Godoy Cruz	Malvinas Argentinas	40,268
Huracán	Buenos Aires	Tomás Adolfo Ducó	48,314
Independiente	Avellaneda	Libertadores de América	52,823
Lanús	Lanús	Ciudad de Lanús - Néstor Díaz Pérez	46,619
Newell's Old Boys	Rosario	Newell's Old Boys	38,095
Racing	Avellaneda	Presidente Perón	51,000
River Plate	Buenos Aires	Antonio V. Liberti	65,645
Rosario Central	Rosario	Dr. Lisandro de la Torre	41,824
San Lorenzo	Buenos Aires	Pedro Bidegain	43,494
San Martín (T)	Tucumán	La Cuidadela	35,000
Tigre	Victoria	Monumental de Victoria	26,282
Vélez Sársfield	Buenos Aires	José Amalfitani	49,540

=== Personnel and kits ===
Club	Manager	Kit manufacturer	Main sponsor
Argentinos Juniors	(Argentina) Claudio Borghi	Diadora	Liderar Seguros
Arsenal	(Argentina) Jorge Burruchaga	Mitre	Liderar Seguros
Banfield	(Argentina) Julio César Falcioni	Nanque	Bingo Lomas
Boca Juniors	(Argentina) Abel Alves	Nike	Megatone
Colón	(Argentina) Antonio Mohamed	Puma	Flecha Bus
Estudiantes (LP)	(Argentina) Alejandro Sabella	Topper	RCA
Gimnasia y Esgrima (J)	(Argentina) Héctor Arzubialde	Dunlop	Banco Macro
Gimnasia y Esgrima (LP)	(Argentina) Leonardo Madelón	Puma/Kappa	La Nueva Seguros
Godoy Cruz	(Argentina) Diego Cocca	Athix	Mendoza
Huracán	(Argentina) Ángel Cappa	Kappa	Motomel
Independiente	(Argentina) Américo Gallego	Umbro	Grupo Marquez
Lanús	(Argentina) Luis Zubeldía	Signia	Bingo Lanús
Newell's Old Boys	(Argentina) Roberto Sensini	Topper	Frigorífico Paladini
Racing	(Argentina) Ricardo Caruso Lombardi	Penalty	Banco Macro
River Plate	(Argentina) Néstor Gorosito	Adidas	Petrobras
Rosario Central	(Argentina) Miguel Ángel Russo	Kappa	Frigorífico Paladini
San Lorenzo	(Argentina) Diego Simeone	Lotto	Walmart
San Martín (T)	(Argentina) Carlos Roldán	Kappa	Refinor
Tigre	(Argentina) Diego Cagna	Diadora	Banco Macro
Vélez Sarsfield	(Argentina) Ricardo Gareca	Penalty	Tarjeta Shopping

=== Managerial changes ===
Team	Outgoing manager	Manner of departure	Date of vacancy	Replaced by	Date of appointment	Position in table
Apertura changes
Huracán	(Argentina) Claudio Úbeda	Resigned	Sep. 14, 2008	(Argentina) Héctor Martínez (interim)	Sep. 15, 2008	20th
Estudiantes (LP)	(Argentina) Roberto Sensini	Resigned	Sep. 17, 2008	(Argentina) Leonardo Astrada	Sep. 20, 2008	18th
Gimnasia y Esgrima (LP)	(Uruguay) Guillermo Sanguinetti	Resigned	Sep. 29, 2008	(Argentina) Leonardo Madelón	Oct. 2, 2008	12th
Independiente	(Argentina) Claudio Borghi	Resigned	Oct. 5, 2008	(Argentina) Miguel Ángel Santoro	Oct. 6, 2008	15th
Rosario Central	(Argentina) Pablo Sánchez	Sacked	Oct. 6, 2008	(Argentina) Gustavo Alfaro	Oct. 10, 2008	19th
Godoy Cruz	(Argentina) Daniel Oldrá	Resigned	Oct. 28, 2008	(Argentina) Diego Cocca	Oct. 29, 2008	18th
Huracán	(Argentina) Héctor Martínez (interim)	End of contract	Nov. 3, 2008	(Argentina) Ángel Cappa	Nov. 4, 2008	15th
River Plate	(Argentina) Diego Simeone	Resigned	Nov. 9, 2008	(Argentina) Gabriel Rodríguez (interim)	Nov. 10, 2008	20th
Vélez Sarsfield	(Argentina) Hugo Tocalli	Resigned	Dec. 3, 2008	(Argentina) Pedro Larraquy (interim)	Dec. 4, 2008	6th
Inter-tournament changes
Argentinos Juniors	(Argentina) Néstor Gorosito	Resigned	Dec. 14, 2008	(Argentina) Claudio Vivas	Dec. 27, 2008	11th (A)
Vélez Sarsfield	(Argentina) Pedro Larraquy (interim)	End of contract	Dec. 15, 2008	(Argentina) Ricardo Gareca	Dec. 16, 2008	9th (A)
River Plate	(Argentina) Gabriel Rodríguez (interim)	End of contract	Dec. 15, 2008	(Argentina) Néstor Gorosito	Dec. 23, 2008	20th (A)
Newell's Old Boys	(Argentina) Fernando Gamboa	Resigned	Dec. 16, 2008	(Argentina) Roberto Sensini	Dec. 22, 2008	5th (A)
Clausura changes
Racing	(Argentina) Juan Manuel Llop	Sacked	Feb. 21, 2009	(Argentina) Ricardo Caruso Lombardi	Feb. 24, 2009	20th
Rosario Central	(Argentina) Gustavo Alfaro	Sacked	Feb. 28, 2009	(Argentina) Reinaldo Merlo	Mar. 2, 2009	18th
Gimnasia y Esgrima (J)	(Argentina) Omar Labruna	Resigned	Mar. 10, 2009	(Argentina) Héctor Arzubialde	Mar. 11, 2009	19th
Estudiantes (LP)	(Argentina) Leonardo Astrada	Resigned	Mar. 11, 2009	(Argentina) Alejandro Sabella	Mar. 15, 2009	18th
Independiente	(Argentina) Miguel Ángel Santoro	Resigned	Mar. 21, 2009	(Argentina) Américo Gallego	Mar. 27, 2009	8th
Banfield	(Argentina) Jorge Burruchaga	Resigned	Mar. 22, 2009	(Argentina) Julio César Falcioni	Mar. 23, 2009	9th
San Lorenzo	(Argentina) Miguel Ángel Russo	Resigned	Apr. 9, 2009	(Argentina) Diego Simeone	Apr. 16, 2009	10th
Rosario Central	(Argentina) Reinaldo Merlo	Resigned	Apr. 14, 2009	(Argentina) Miguel Ángel Russo	Apr. 16, 2009	9th
Arsenal	(Argentina) Daniel Garnero	Sacked	Apr. 25, 2009	(Argentina) José Rizzo (interim)	Apr. 26, 2009	16th
Arsenal	(Argentina) José Rizzo (interim)	End of contract	May 4, 2009	(Argentina) Jorge Burruchaga	May 5, 2009	18th
Argentinos Juniors	(Argentina) Claudio Vivas	Resigned	May 23, 2009	(Argentina) Claudio Borghi	Jun. 2, 2009	20th
Boca Juniors	(Argentina) Carlos Ischia	Resigned	Jun. 16, 2009	(Argentina) Abel Alves (interim)	Jun. 17, 2009	15th

== Torneo Apertura ==
The Torneo Apertura (English: Opening Tournament) was played between August 6 to December 14, 2008. The champions earned a spot in the 2009 Copa Libertadores.

=== Standings ===
Pos	Team	Pld	W	D	L	GF	GA	GD	Pts	Qualification
1	San Lorenzo	19	12	3	4	34	17	+17	39	Qualification for Championship playoff
1	Boca Juniors	19	12	3	4	33	21	+12	39	Qualification for Championship playoff
1	Tigre	19	12	3	4	31	19	+12	39	Qualification for Championship playoff
4	Lanús	19	11	4	4	34	23	+11	37	
5	Newell's Old Boys	19	8	7	4	26	18	+8	31	
6	Arsenal	19	8	4	7	26	27	−1	28	
7	Estudiantes (LP)	19	8	4	7	24	25	−1	28	
8	Gimnasia y Esgrima (LP)	19	6	9	4	17	15	+2	27	
9	Vélez Sarsfield	19	7	5	7	22	27	−5	26	
10	Colón	19	5	8	6	29	25	+4	23	
11	Argentinos Juniors	19	5	8	6	25	26	−1	23	
12	Godoy Cruz	19	6	5	8	25	28	−3	23	
13	Banfield	19	5	8	6	18	21	−3	23	
14	Racing	19	5	7	7	19	22	−3	22	
15	Gimnasia y Esgrima (J)	19	6	3	10	19	31	−12	21	
16	San Martín (T)	19	5	5	9	15	18	−3	20	
17	Huracán	19	5	5	9	18	29	−11	20	
18	Independiente	19	4	6	9	15	23	−8	18	
19	Rosario Central	19	4	3	12	20	26	−6	15	
20	River Plate	19	2	8	9	20	29	−9	14	

Source: RSSSF
Rules for classification: Rules for classification: 1st points; 2nd goal difference; 3rd goals scored; 4th head-to-head points; 5th head-to-head goal difference; 6th head-to-head goals scored. This does not apply to determining the champion. If two or more teams would be tied in points at the end of the tournament, a playoff would be held at a neutral venue within 72 hours for the championship.

=== Results ===
Home \ Away	ARJ	ARS	BAN	BOC	COL	EST	GJU	GLP	GCR	HUR	IND	LAN	NOB	RAC	RIV	RCE	SLO	SMT	TIG	VEL
Argentinos Juniors				0–0		5–0				2–0			0–4	0–1		0–0	0–1		2–0	4–1
Arsenal	3–0		3–2	0–1	3–2				2–1	1–0			1–1	2–2	2–2					3–3
Banfield	2–2			0–1	0–0				1–2	0–0			2–1	1–0	2–1		1–3			2–2
Boca Juniors					3–2	1–2	4–0				1–1	2–1		2–1		2–1	1–0		2–3	2–3
Colón	5–2					0–1			0–0	1–1	1–2	3–3	1–1		1–1				2–2	
Estudiantes (LP)		2–0	2–2				2–0	3–1			1–0	1–0			1–1			1–1	3–1	
Gimnasia y Esgrima (J)	1–1	0–1	2–0		1–4			1–1	2–1	4–3			1–0		1–0			1–0		
Gimnasia y Esgrima (LP)	1–1	0–1	0–0	0–0	1–0				3–1	1–0			0–1		0–0			1–0		
Godoy Cruz	1–1			4–1		2–1				2–3			0–0	1–0		1–0	1–2			1–3
Huracán				0–3		1–0					1–0		1–1	1–0		0–2	1–4		0–3	3–0
Independiente	1–1	1–2	0–1				3–2	1–1	1–1			0–2			0–1			1–0		
Lanús	4–2	2–1	1–1				3–2	1–1	4–3	0–0					2–0			1–0		
Newell's Old Boys				2–4		1–1					1–0	2–1		3–0		1–0	3–3		2–0	1–0
Racing					0–2	2–1	0–0	1–1			1–1	0–2				4–1	2–1		0–0	0–0
River Plate	1–2			0–1					1–2	3–3			1–1	3–3		2–0	0–0			1–2
Rosario Central		3–0	0–0		0–1	3–2	3–0	0–1			1–2	1–2						1–1	2–3	
San Lorenzo		2–0			3–0	3–0	2–1	1–1			4–1	1–3				2–1		1–0	0–1	
San Martín (T)	0–0	1–0	0–1	1–2	1–1				1–1	2–0			2–0	0–2	3–1					
Tigre		2–1	1–0				1–0	3–1	2–0		1–0	3–0			3–1			1–2		
Vélez Sarsfield					0–3	1–0	2–0	0–2			0–0	0–2				2–1	0–1	2–0	1–1	

Source: RSSSF
Legend: Blue = home team win; Yellow = draw; Red = away team win.

=== Championship playoff ===
Since San Lorenzo, Tigre and Boca Juniors ended the tournament with the same number of points, a three-way playoff was played to determine the champions.

Pos	Team	Pld	W	D	L	GF	GA	GD	Pts	Qualification
1	Boca Juniors (C)	2	1	0	1	3	2	+1	3	Qualification for 2009 Copa Libertadores Second Stage
2	Tigre	2	1	0	1	2	2	0	3	
3	San Lorenzo	2	1	0	1	3	4	−1	3	

Source: RSSSF
(C) Champions
2008 Torneo Apertura playoff
December 17, 2008
Round 1

Tigre	1–2	San Lorenzo
Lázzaro 76'	Report	Barrientos 18'; Bergessio 20'

Vélez Sarsfield Stadium, Buenos Aires
Referee: Saúl Laverni

December 20, 2008
Round 2

San Lorenzo	1–3	Boca Juniors
Solari 61'	Report	Viatri 45'; Palacio 77'; Chávez 90'

Racing Stadium, Avellaneda
Referee: Héctor Baldassi

December 23, 2008
Round 3

Boca Juniors	0–1	Tigre
	Report	Lázzaro 68'

Racing Stadium, Avellaneda
Referee: Sergio Pezzotta

=== Top Goalscorers ===
Pos	Player	Team	Goals
1	(Argentina) José Sand	Lanús	15
2	(Argentina) Martín Morel	Tigre	13
3	(Argentina) Esteban Fuertes	Colón	11
4	(Argentina) Alejandro Gómez	Arsenal	8
4	(Argentina) Mauro Boselli	Estudiantes (LP)	8
6	(Argentina) Rubén Ramírez	Colón	7
6	(Argentina) Lucas Viatri	Boca Juniors	7
6	(Argentina) Pablo Barrientos	San Lorenzo	7
6	(Argentina) Leonel Núñez	Independiente	7
6	(Argentina) Carlos Luna	Tigre	7

Source: Scorer Stats (in Spanish)

== Torneo Clausura ==
The Torneo Clausura (English: Closing Tournament) began on February 6, 2009 and ended on July 5, 2009. The champions earned a spot in the 2010 Copa Libertadores.

=== Standings ===
Pos	Team	Pld	W	D	L	GF	GA	GD	Pts	Qualification
1	Vélez Sarsfield (C)	19	11	7	1	29	13	+16	40	Qualification for 2010 Copa Libertadores Second Stage
2	Huracán	19	12	2	5	35	19	+16	38	
3	Lanús	19	12	2	5	32	26	+6	38	
4	Colón	19	10	4	5	29	19	+10	34	
5	Racing	19	8	6	5	23	21	+2	30	
6	Estudiantes (LP)	19	8	5	6	22	18	+4	29	
7	Gimnasia y Esgrima (LP)	19	7	7	5	23	21	+2	28	
8	River Plate	19	7	6	6	24	25	−1	27	
9	Godoy Cruz	19	7	5	7	23	26	−3	26	
10	Rosario Central	19	7	4	8	23	21	+2	25	
11	San Lorenzo	19	7	3	9	27	26	+1	24	
12	Banfield	19	6	5	8	25	25	0	23	
13	Tigre	19	6	5	8	24	25	−1	23	
14	Boca Juniors	19	6	4	9	22	25	−3	22	
15	Newell's Old Boys	19	4	9	6	21	22	−1	21	
16	Independiente	19	6	3	10	22	36	−14	21	
17	San Martín (T)	19	5	5	9	20	23	−3	20	
18	Arsenal	19	4	6	9	19	30	−11	18	
19	Gimnasia y Esgrima (J)	19	4	5	10	15	24	−9	17	
20	Argentinos Juniors	19	2	9	8	19	32	−13	15	

Source: AFA
Rules for classification: Rules for classification: 1st points; 2nd goal difference; 3rd goals scored; 4th head-to-head points; 5th head-to-head goal difference; 6th head-to-head goals scored.
(C) Champions

Primera División
2009 Clausura champions

7th title

=== Results ===
Home \ Away	ARJ	ARS	BAN	BOC	COL	EST	GJU	GLP	GCR	HUR	IND	LAN	NOB	RAC	RIV	RCE	SLO	SMT	TIG	VEL
Argentinos Juniors		0–2	1–1		2–0		0–1	1–1	2–4		1–1	2–1			0–0			2–2		
Arsenal						3–1	0–1	0–0			1–1	4–1				0–5	1–1	1–1	2–0	
Banfield		2–0				1–0	2–2	3–1			5–0	0–1				3–1		0–0	0–3	
Boca Juniors	3–0	2–1	2–3					1–2	1–1	3–1			0–2		1–1			3–0		
Colón		1–1	2–0	1–3			1–0	2–0						0–0		2–0	3–0	2–0		2–4
Estudiantes (LP)	3–2			1–0	1–3		1–0		1–0	1–1			1–0	0–0		0–0	2–1			0–1
Gimnasia y Esgrima (J)				1–2		0–0					4–1	0–2		0–2		0–1	0–3		1–1	0–1
Gimnasia y Esgrima (LP)						1–1	2–0				2–0	3–2		0–0		1–1	1–2		0–1	3–1
Godoy Cruz		1–0	1–1		1–3		2–2	1–1			2–0	0–1			1–0			3–2	0–2	
Huracán	4–1	3–0	2–1		0–1		2–1	0–2	3–2			3–0			4–0			1–0		
Independiente				2–0	0–1	1–5				2–1			4–1	2–0		3–1	0–1		4–1	0–0
Lanús				1–0	2–1	0–3					5–1		2–1	3–1		2–1	2–1		2–1	1–1
Newell's Old Boys	1–1	1–1	1–1		1–1		1–1	3–0	1–1	2–2					1–0			0–1		
Racing	1–1	4–1	1–0	3–0					1–0	1–4			2–1		1–0			1–2		
River Plate		3–1	2–0		2–2	1–2	1–0	2–2			2–0	1–1						2–1	3–1	
Rosario Central	2–1			2–0					0–1	1–2			1–1	0–1	1–2		3–1			1–1
San Lorenzo	3–0		3–1	1–1					1–2	0–1			0–2	1–1	5–1					0–1
San Martín (T)						1–0	0–1	0–1			3–0	2–3				0–1	3–0		2–2	0–0
Tigre	1–1			0–0	2–1	2–0				0–1			1–1	4–1		0–1	1–3			1–2
Vélez Sarsfield	1–1	2–0	2–1	2–0					4–0	1–0			2–0	2–2	1–1					

Source: RSSSF
Legend: Blue = home team win; Yellow = draw; Red = away team win.

=== Top Goalscorers ===
Pos	Player	Team	Goals
1	(Argentina) José Sand	Lanús	13
2	(Argentina) Daniel Montenegro	Independiente	12
2	(Argentina) Esteban Fuertes	Colón	12
4	(Uruguay) Hernán López	Vélez Sarsfield	11
4	(Argentina) Carlos Luna	Tigre	11
6	(Uruguay) Santiago Silva	Banfield	9
7	(Argentina) Leandro Caruso	Godoy Cruz	8
7	(Colombia) Radamel Falcao	River Plate	8
7	(Argentina) Gonzalo Bergessio	San Lorenzo	8
10	(Argentina) Javier Pastore	Huracán	7
10	(Argentina) Martín Palermo	Boca Juniors	7

Source: AFA

== Relegation ==
Relegation from the Primera Division was determined on the basis of performance over the last three seasons. Every club had its points earned divided by the number of matches played and an average (Spanish: promedio) was determined. The clubs who finished in 17th and 18th played a relegation play-off against the 3rd and 4th placed clubs in Primera B Nacional. The clubs who finished in 19th and 20th were directly relegated to Primera B Nacional.

Pos	Team	2006–07 Pts	2007–08 Pts	2008–09 Pts	Total Pts	Total Pld	Avg	Relegation
1	Boca Juniors	83	70	61	214	114	1.877	
2	Estudiantes (LP)	81	69	57	207	114	1.815	
3	San Lorenzo	73	64	63	200	114	1.754	
4	Lanús	59	56	75	190	114	1.666	
5	Vélez Sarsfield	56	59	66	181	114	1.587	
6	River Plate	71	66	41	178	114	1.561	
7	Tigre	—	56	62	118	76	1.552	
8	Huracán	—	52	58	110	76	1.447	
9	Arsenal	62	51	46	159	114	1.394	
10	Independiente	57	59	39	155	114	1.359	
11	Colón	46	45	57	148	114	1.298	
12	Godoy Cruz	—	—	49	49	38	1.289	
13	Argentinos Juniors	46	61	38	145	114	1.271	
14	Newell's Old Boys	35	56	52	143	114	1.254	
15	Racing	49	40	52	141	114	1.236	
16	Banfield	39	54	46	139	114	1.219	
17	Rosario Central	52	41	40	133	114	1.166	Relegation Playoff Matches
18	Gimnasia y Esgrima (LP)	40	36	55	131	114	1.149	Relegation Playoff Matches
19	San Martín (T)	—	—	40	40	38	1.052	Relegation to Primera B Nacional
20	Gimnasia y Esgrima (J)	43	35	38	116	114	1.017	Relegation to Primera B Nacional

Source:AFA

=== Relegation/promotion playoffs ===
Team 1	Agg.	Team 2	1st leg	2nd leg
Relegation/promotion playoff 1
Atlético de Rafaela	3–3	Gimnasia y Esgrima (LP)	3–0	0–3
Relegation/promotion playoff 2
Belgrano	1–2	Rosario Central	0–1	1–1

Gimnasia y Esgrima (LP) remained in the Argentine First Division after a 3–3 aggregate tie by virtue of a "sports advantage". In case of a tie in goals, the team from the First Division gets to stay in it. Rosario Central won 2–1 and stayed in the Argentine First Division, while Belgrano does not get promoted and remains in Argentine Nacional B.

== International qualification ==
=== Copa Libertadores ===
The Apertura champions qualified for the 2009 Copa Libertadores and the Clausura champions qualified to the 2010 Copa Libertadores. The last two Argentina spots for the 2009 Copa Libertadores were determined by the sum of all points obtained in the past three tournaments.

Pos	Team	Pld	W	D	L	GF	GA	GD	Pts	Qualification
1	Boca Juniors (Note: Boca Juniors qualified as 2008 Apertura champions.)	57	32	13	12	98	54	+44	109	Qualification for 2009 Copa Libertadores Second Stage
2	San Lorenzo	57	31	10	16	93	65	+28	103	Qualification for 2009 Copa Libertadores Second Stage
3	Estudiantes (LP)	57	27	16	14	60	60	0	97	Qualification for 2009 Copa Libertadores First Stage
4	Tigre	57	28	11	18	83	76	+7	95	
5	Lanús (Note: Lanús qualified as 2007 Apertura champions.)	57	27	12	18	94	83	+11	93	Qualification for 2009 Copa Libertadores Second Stage
6	Newell's Old Boys	57	24	15	18	63	59	+4	87	
7	Vélez Sarsfield	57	24	13	20	71	69	+2	85	
8	Argentinos Juniors	57	23	15	19	77	70	+7	84	
9	River Plate (Note: River Plate qualified as 2008 Clausura champions.)	57	21	17	19	80	75	+5	80	Qualification for 2009 Copa Libertadores Second Stage
10	Arsenal	57	22	13	22	67	76	−9	79	
11	Banfield	57	21	14	22	76	78	−2	77	
12	Independiente	57	20	17	20	73	61	+12	77	
13	Huracán	57	18	18	21	57	67	−10	72	
14	Colón	57	17	17	23	73	74	−1	68	
15	Gimnasia y Esgrima (LP)	57	15	18	24	51	68	−17	63	
16	Racing	57	14	20	23	56	68	−12	62	
17	Gimnasia y Esgrima (J)	57	13	17	27	61	90	−29	56	
18	Rosario Central	57	13	17	27	67	82	−15	56	
19	Godoy Cruz	19	6	5	8	25	28	−3	23	
20	San Martín (T)	19	5	5	9	15	18	−3	20	

Source: AFA

=== Copa Sudamericana ===
Qualification for the 2009 Copa Sudamericana was determined from an aggregate table of the Apertura and Clausura tournaments. The top four teams in the aggregate table qualified; Boca Juniors and River Plate were invited every year till this season, regardless of their standings in the season.

Pos	Team	Pld	W	D	L	GF	GA	GD	Pts	Qualification
1	Lanús	38	23	6	9	66	49	+17	75	2009 Copa Sudamericana First Stage
2	Vélez Sarsfield	38	18	12	8	51	40	+11	66	2009 Copa Sudamericana First Stage
3	San Lorenzo	38	19	6	13	61	43	+18	63	2009 Copa Sudamericana First Stage
4	Tigre	38	18	8	12	55	44	+11	62	2009 Copa Sudamericana First Stage
5	Boca Juniors	38	18	7	13	55	46	+9	61	2009 Copa Sudamericana First Stage
6	Huracán	38	17	7	14	53	48	+5	58	
7	Colón	38	15	12	11	58	44	+14	57	
8	Estudiantes (LP)	38	16	9	13	46	43	+3	57	
9	Gimnasia y Esgrima (LP)	38	13	16	9	40	36	+4	55	
10	Newell's Old Boys	38	12	16	10	47	40	+7	52	
11	Racing	38	13	13	12	42	43	−1	52	
12	Godoy Cruz	38	13	10	15	48	54	−6	49	
13	Arsenal	38	12	10	16	45	57	−12	46	
14	Banfield	38	11	13	14	43	46	−3	46	
15	River Plate	38	9	14	15	44	54	−10	41	2009 Copa Sudamericana First Stage
16	Rosario Central	38	11	7	20	43	47	−4	40	
17	San Martín (T)	38	10	10	18	35	41	−6	40	
18	Independiente	38	10	9	19	37	59	−22	39	
19	Gimnasia y Esgrima (J)	38	10	8	20	34	55	−21	38	
20	Argentinos Juniors	38	7	17	14	44	58	−14	38	

Source: AFA
Rules for classification: 1st points; 2nd head-to-head points; 3rd head-to-head goal difference; 4th head-to-head goals

== See also ==
- 2008–09 in Argentine football
