= 2012 Copa Argentina Final =

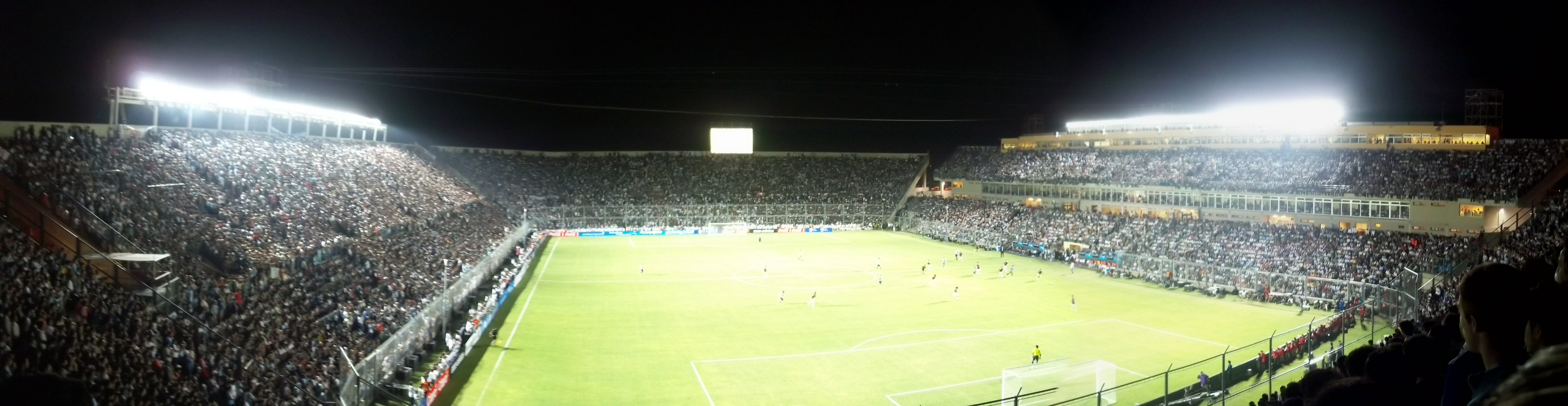
- Estadio del Bicentenario, venue
- Event: 2011–12 Copa Argentina
Boca Juniors	Racing Club
2	1
- Date: August 8, 2012
- Venue: Estadio San Juan del Bicentenario, San Juan
- Referee: Pablo Lunati

The 2012 Copa Argentina Final was the 185th and final match of the 2011–12 Copa Argentina, the first edition of the national cup relaunched by AFA in 2011. It was played in single match between Boca Juniors and Racing Club, on August 8, 2012 at the Estadio San Juan del Bicentenario. The winner qualified to play the 2012 Copa Sudamericana.

Boca Juniors won the match 2–1 with goals by strikers Santiago Silva and Lucas Viatri, achieving their 2nd. Copa Argentina title.

== Qualified teams ==
Team	Previous finals app.
Boca Juniors	1 (**1969**)
Racing Club	None

Bold indicates winning years

=== Road to the final ===
Boca Juniors			Round	Racing		
Opponent	Venue	Score		Opponent	Venue	Score
			Final Round			
Santamarina	Salta	1–1 (4–3 p)	Round of 64	El Porvenir	San Juan	2–0
Central Córdoba (R)	San Juan	2–0	Round of 32	Patronato	Salta	3–1
Olimpo	Catamarca	1–1 (11–10 p)	Round of 16	Sarmiento (R)	Resistencia	2–0
Rosario Central	San Juan	1–1 (4–2 p)	Quarterfinals	Atlético Tucumán	Catamarca	1–0
Deportivo Merlo	Catamarca	1–1 (5–4 p)	Semifinals	River Plate	Salta	0–0 (5–4 p)

== Match ==
=== First half ===
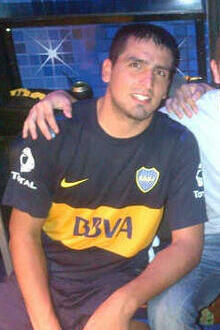
Lucas Viatri scored the 2nd goal for Boca Juniors to secure the victory

In the first half, Luis Zubeldía's men started stronger. More precise and incisive than Julio Falcioni's side, they managed to threaten Oscar Ustari's goal. By the 18th minute, José Sand had already had two clear chances to score. The first was a ball he took too long and ended up shooting wide of the goalkeeper's right post. The other was a ball from the center of the penalty area that went inches wide of the top right goal post.

Boca hadn't threatened and needed only one chance to take the lead. In the 22nd minute, a long ball from Ustari and a defensive error by Racing left the ball perfectly placed for Santiago Silva. The Uruguayan looked up and shot over the onrushing goalkeeper Sebastián Saja to score the first goal of the match.

From that moment on, Boca evened the game and made better use of the spaces Racing were leaving at the back. Zubeldía's defense was pressing too high up the pitch, leaving gaps. Silva again got behind the center-backs, but Saja made the save to prevent what would have been a 2–0 lead.

=== Second half ===
In the opening minutes of the second half, not much happened until Boca Juniors put together a good attacking move. Juan Sánchez Miño (who had replaced Walter Ervitti) and Clemente Rodríguez combined down the left flank, and forward Lucas Viatri finished with his left foot in the center to take a 2–0 lead in the 18th minute.

At their lowest point, Racing found the equalizer when a corner kick fell to Matías Martínez, whose shot hit the post and then Ustari's back, leaving it perfectly placed for Valentín Viola to score his last goal in the Avellaneda team's shirt before moving to Portugal.

With just over 20 minutes remaining, Zubeldía's team pressed forward with more desire than skill in their search for the equalizer, which never came. In fact, in the final minutes, Boca Juniors had the clearest chances. Viatri's header hit the crossbar, Silva couldn't beat Saja, and Matías Cahais cleared Cristian Chávez's shot off the line. Midfielder Pablo Ledesma had another opportunity but couldn't convert, and Boca also squandered several counter-attacks that ended poorly.

=== Details ===
2011–12 Copa Argentina Final
August 8, 2012
20:30 (UTC−03:00)

Boca Juniors	2–1	Racing
Silva 21'; Viatri 62'	Report (1); Report (2)	Viola 68'

Estadio San Juan del Bicentenario, San Juan
Referee: Pablo Lunati

**Boca Juniors**	**Racing**

GK	23	(Argentina) Oscar Ustari
DF	4	(Argentina) Franco Sosa
DF	2	(Argentina) Rolando Schiavi (c)
DF	6	(Argentina) Matías Caruzzo
DF	3	(Argentina) Clemente Rodríguez	(yellow card) 6'
MF	16	(Argentina) Pablo Ledesma
MF	18	(Argentina) Leandro Somoza
MF	11	(Argentina) Walter Erviti		(substituted off) 53'
MF	21	(Argentina) Cristian Chávez	(yellow card) 77'	(substituted off) 89'
FW	9	(Argentina) Lucas Viatri		(substituted off) 90+4'
FW	19	(Uruguay) Santiago Silva
Substitutes:
GK	12	(Argentina) Sebastián D'Angelo
DF	14	(Argentina) Christian Cellay		(substituted on) 90+4'
MF	28	(Argentina) Juan Sánchez Miño		(substituted on) 53'
MF	22	(Argentina) Cristian Erbes
MF	26	(Argentina) Cristian Álvarez		(substituted on) 89'
MF	27	(Paraguay) Orlando Gaona Lugo
FW	17	(Argentina) Nicolás Blandi
Manager:
(Argentina) Julio César Falcioni

GK	1	(Argentina) Sebastián Saja (c)
DF	2	(Argentina) Matías Martínez
DF	19	(Argentina) Fernando Ortiz
DF	6	(Argentina) Matías Cahais
DF	32	(Argentina) Claudio Corvalán	(yellow card) 27'	(substituted off) 67'
MF	8	(Argentina) Diego Villar	(yellow card) 38'	(substituted off) 81'
MF	16	(Argentina) (Italy) Mauro Camoranessi
MF	5	(Argentina) Agustín Pelletieri		(substituted off) 74'
MF	26	(Argentina) Ricardo Centurión
FW	20	(Argentina) Valentín Viola
FW	9	(Argentina) José Sand
Substitutes:
GK	21	(Argentina) Jorge De Olivera
DF	4	(Argentina) Iván Pillud
MF	15	(Argentina) Bruno Zuculini
MF	11	(Argentina) Luis Fariña		(substituted on) 67'
DF	17	(Uruguay) Leonardo Migliónico
FW	7	(Argentina) Gabriel Hauche		(substituted on) 81'
FW	18	(Argentina) Javier Cámpora		(substituted on) 74'
Manager:
(Argentina) Luis Zubeldía

Assistant referees:
Hernán Maidana
Sergio Viola
Fourth official:
Fernando Rapallini

**Match rules**

- 90 minutes
- No extra time
- Penalty shoot-out if scores are level
- Seven named substitutes
- Maximum of three substitutions

=== Statistics ===
First half
	Boca Juniors	Racing
Goals scored	1	0
Total shots	6	3
Shots on target	2	2
Ball possession	40%	60%
Fouls committed	8	5
Yellow cards	1	2
Red cards	0	0

Second half
	Boca Juniors	Racing
Goals scored	1	1
Total shots	3	2
Shots on target	6	3
Ball possession	44%	56%
Fouls committed	6	5
Yellow cards	1	0
Red cards	0	0

Overall
	Boca Juniors	Racing
Goals scored	2	1
Total shots	9	5
Shots on target	8	5
Ball possession	42%	58%
Fouls committed	14	10
Yellow cards	2	2
Red cards	0	0
