= 2011–12 Copa Argentina =

Tournament details
- Country: Argentina
- Teams: 186

Final positions
- Champions: Boca Juniors (2nd title)
- Runners-up: Racing
- 2012 Copa Sudamericana: Boca Juniors

Tournament statistics
- Matches played: 185
- Goals scored: 357 (1.93 per match)

The 2011–12 Copa Argentina was the third edition of the Copa Argentina, and the first since 1970. The competition began on August 31, 2011 and ended on August 8, 2012. The tournament featured 186 clubs from the top five levels of the Argentine football league system. The winner (Boca Juniors) qualified for the 2012 Copa Sudamericana.

The tournament was originally scheduled to end on May 25, but due to the participation of Boca Juniors in the knockout stages of the Copa Libertadores, the final was played on 8 August 2012, with Boca Juniors triumphing 2–1 against Racing.

== Teams ==
One hundred and eighty-six teams took part in this season's competition. All the teams from the Primera División (20), Primera B Nacional (20), Primera B Metropolitana (21), Torneo Argentino A (25), Primera C (20), Torneo Argentino B (60), and Primera D (18) competed in the tournament. Two teams from provinces that do not have representation and that compete in the Torneo del Interior rounded out the field of participants.

Primera División

- All Boys
- Argentinos Juniors
- Arsenal
- Atlético de Rafaela
- Banfield
- Belgrano
- Boca Juniors
- Colón
- Estudiantes (LP)
- Godoy Cruz
- Independiente
- Lanús
- Newell's Old Boys
- Olimpo
- Racing
- San Lorenzo
- San Martín (SJ)
- Tigre
- Unión
- Vélez Sársfield

Primera B Nacional

- Aldosivi
- Almirante Brown
- Atlanta
- Atlético Tucumán
- Boca Unidos
- Chacarita Juniors
- Defensa y Justicia
- Deportivo Merlo
- Desamparados
- Ferro Carril Oeste
- Gimnasia y Esgrima (J)
- Gimnasia y Esgrima (LP)
- Guillermo Brown (M)
- Huracán
- Independiente Rivadavia
- Instituto
- Patronato
- Quilmes
- River Plate
- Rosario Central

Primera B Metropolitana

- Acassuso
- Almagro
- Barracas Central
- Brown (A)
- Colegiales
- Comunicaciones
- Defensores de Belgrano
- Deportivo Armenio
- Deportivo Morón
- Estudiantes (BA)
- Flandria
- General Lamadrid
- Los Andes
- Nueva Chicago
- Platense
- San Telmo
- Sarmiento (J)
- Sportivo Italiano
- Temperley
- Tristán Suárez

Villa San Carlos

Torneo Argentino A

- Alumni (VM)
- Central Córdoba (SdE)
- Central Norte
- CAI
- Cipolletti
- Crucero del Norte
- Defensores de Belgrano (VR)
- Deportivo Maipú
- Douglas Haig
- Gimnasia y Esgrima (CdU)
- Gimnasia y Tiro
- Huracán (TA)
- Juventud Antoniana
- Juventud Unida Universitario
- Libertad (S)
- Racing (C)
- Racing (O)
- Rivadavia
- San Martín (T)
- Santamarina
- Sportivo Belgrano
- Talleres (C)
- Tiro Federal
- Unión (MdP)
- Unión (S)

Primera C

- Argentino (M)
- Berazategui
- Central Córdoba (R)
- Defensores de Cambaceres
- Defensores Unidos
- Deportivo Español
- Deportivo Laferrere
- Dock Sud
- El Porvenir
- Excursionistas
- Ferrocarril Midland
- J. J. de Urquiza
- Leandro N. Alem
- Liniers
- Luján
- Sacachispas
- San Miguel
- Talleres (RE)
- UAI Urquiza
- Villa Dálmine

Torneo Argentino B

- 9 de Julio (M)
- 9 de Julio (R)
- Altos Hornos Zapla
- Alvarado
- Alvear
- Atenas (RC)
- Bella Vista (BB)
- Ben Hur
- Boca (RG)
- Chaco For Ever
- Colegiales (C)
- Concepción BRS
- Concepción
- Cruz del Sur
- Defensores (P)
- Deportivo Madryn
- Deportivo Roca
- El Linqueño
- Estudiantes (RC)
- Ferrocarril Sud
- General Paz Juniors
- Gimnasia y Esgrima (Mza)
- Grupo Universitario (T)
- Guaraní Antonio Franco
- Guaymallén
- Huracán (CR)
- Huracán (LH)
- Independiente (T)
- Jorge Brown (P)
- Jorge Newbery (CR)
- Jorge Newbery (VT)
- Juventud Alianza
- Juventud Unida (G)
- La Emilia
- Las Heras (C)
- Liniers (BB)
- Maronese
- Mitre (SdE)
- Once Tigres
- Origone
- Paraná
- Policial
- Racing (T)
- San Martín (F)
- San Martín (M)
- San Jorge (SF)
- San Jorge (T)
- Sarmiento (C)
- Sarmiento (R)
- Sarmiento (SdE)
- Sportivo Del Bono
- Sportivo Las Parejas
- Sportivo Patria
- Talleres (P)
- Textil Mandiyú
- Tiro Federal (M)
- Trinidad
- Unión (VK)
- Villa Cubas (C)
- Villa Mitre

Primera D

- Argentino (Q)
- Argentino (R)
- Atlas
- Cañuelas
- Central Ballester
- Centro Español
- Claypole
- Deportivo Paraguayo
- Deportivo Riestra
- Fénix
- Ituzaingó
- Juventud Unida
- Lugano
- Muñiz
- San Martín (B)
- Sportivo Barracas
- Victoriano Arenas
- Yupanqui

Torneo del Interior

- Real Madrid (RG)
- Riojano

== Venues ==
For the final phase, the organization selected 15 stadiums in several Argentine provinces to be used as neutral grounds.

	Banfield	Buenos Aires	Buenos Aires
	Estadio Florencio Sola	Estadio Diego Armando Maradona	Estadio Tomás Adolfo Ducó
	Capacity: 35,000	Capacity: 24,800	Capacity: 48,000
			Estádio José Alvalade XXI
	Catamarca	José Ingenieros	Lanús
	Estadio Bicentenario Ciudad de Catamarca	Estadio Tres de Febrero	Estadio Ciudad de Lanús
	Capacity: 18,500	Capacity: 16,000	Capacity: 46,600
Quilmes	Resistencia	Rosario	Rosario
Estadio Centenario Dr. José Luis Meiszner	Estadio Centenario	Estadio Marcelo Bielsa	Estadio Gigante de Arroyito
Capacity: 30,000	Capacity: 25,000	Capacity: 38,000	Capacity: 41,600

== Schedule ==
Round	Dates	Number of fixtures	Clubs	New entries this round	Prize money (in ARS)
First round	Aug. 31, 2011	9	186→177	18	$20,000
Second round	Sep. 7–8; Sep. 14–15, 2011	66	177→111	128	$20,000
Third round	Sep. 14–15, 2011	23	111→88	5	$20,000
Fourth round	Sep. 21–22; Sep. 28–29, 2011	24	88→64	None	$20,000
Round of 64	Nov. 22–23; Nov. 29–30; Dec. 6–8; Dec. 13–15, 2011	32	64→32	40	$200,000
Round of 32	Feb. 28–Mar. 1; Mar. 6–Mar. 8; Mar. 13–15; Mar. 20–22, 2012	16	32→16	None	$300,000
Round of 16	Apr. 3–5; Apr. 10–12, 2012	8	16→8	None	$400,000
Quarterfinals	Apr. 24–26, 2012	4	8→4	None	$500,000
Semifinals	May 15 & 17, 2012	2	4→2	None	$800,000
Final	May 25, 2012	1	2→1	None	$1,500,000

== Initial phase ==
=== First round ===
In the First Round, the eighteen teams from the Primera D competed in nine matches. The winners of the nine matches advanced to the next round into the Metropolitan Zone. The matches were played on August 31.

August 31, 2011 Match 1	Victoriano Arenas	0–2	Argentino (Q)	Avellaneda, Buenos Aires
15:00			Kevin Juan; Gonzalo Vivanco	Stadium: Estadio Saturnino Moure; Referee: Juan Pafundi

August 31, 2011 Match 2	Atlas	0–0 (4–5 p)	Claypole	General Rodríguez, Buenos Aires
15:00				Stadium: Estadio Ricardo Puga; Referee: Lucas Comesaña

August 31, 2011 Match 3	Ituzaingó	1–0	Argentino (R)	Ituzaingó, Buenos Aires
15:00	Alan Domínguez (o.g.)			Stadium: Estadio Ituzaingó; Referee: Leandro Nuñez

August 31, 2011 Match 4	Lugano	0–0 (4–5 p)	San Martín (B)	Tapiales, Buenos Aires
15:00				Stadium: Estadio del Club Atlético Lugano; Referee: Tomás Diulio

August 31, 2011 Match 5	Deportivo Riestra	1–0	Muñiz	Buenos Aires
15:00	Ezequiel Toselli			Stadium: Estadio Guillermo Laza; Referee: Gonzalo Filomeno

August 31, 2011 Match 6	Cañuelas	0–0 (5–3 p)	Centro Español	Cañuelas, Buenos Aires
15:00				Stadium: Estadio Jorge Alfredo Arín; Referee: Damián Rubino

August 31, 2011 Match 7	Juventud Unida	1–0	Central Ballester	San Miguel, Buenos Aires
15:00	Leonardo Espinoza			Stadium: Estadio Franco Murggieri; Referee: Hernán Mastrángelo

August 31, 2011 Match 8	Fénix	1–0	Sportivo Barracas	Pilar, Buenos Aires
15:00	Leonel Bargas			Stadium: Estadio Municipal de Pilar; Referee: Eugenio Bevacqua

August 31, 2011 Match 9	Yupanqui	2–0	Deportivo Paraguayo	San Justo, Buenos Aires
15:00	Ignacio Bilbao			Stadium: Estadio Juan Antonio Arias; Referee: Matías Arévalo

=== Second round ===
The Second Round is divided into two zones: the Metropolitan Zone and the Interior Zone.

==== Metropolitan Zone ====
The Metropolitan Zone featured the twenty-one teams from the Primera B Metropolitana, the twenty teams from Primera C, and the nine winners of the First Round. The twenty-five winners advanced to the Fourth Round.

September 14, 2011 Match 10	Acassuso	1–0	Argentino (Q)

September 14, 2011 Match 11	Barracas Central	0–0	Claypole

September 14, 2011 Match 12	Nueva Chicago	2–0	Ituzaingó

September 13, 2011 Match 13	Defensores de Belgrano	1–1 (4–2 p)	San Martín (B)

September 14, 2011 Match 14	Los Andes	0–0 (2–4 p)	Deportivo Riestra

September 21, 2011 Match 15	Deportivo Morón	2–0	Cañuelas

September 21, 2011 Match 16	Platense	3–1	Juventud Unida

September 13, 2011 Match 17	Sarmiento (J)	1–1 (4–2 p)	Fénix

September 15, 2011 Match 18	Temperley	2–1	Yupanqui

September 15, 2011 Match 19	Almagro	0–0 (5–4 p)	Ferrocarril Midland

September 14, 2011 Match 20	Deportivo Armenio	1–3	Villa Dálmine

September 14, 2011 Match 21	Brown	0–1	Defensores de Cambaceres

September 14, 2011 Match 22	Colegiales	1–0	UAI Urquiza

September 14, 2011 Match 23	Comunicaciones	0–0 (5–3 p)	Deportivo Español

September 14, 2011 Match 24	Estudiantes (BA)	1–0	Defensores Unidos

September 14, 2011 Match 25	Flandria	0–0 (2–4 p)	Sacachispas

September 14, 2011 Match 26	Sportivo Italiano	2–1	Luján

September 20, 2011 Match 27	General Lamadrid	1–1 (5–4 p)	Dock Sud

September 7, 2011 Match 28	San Telmo	2–0	San Miguel

September 21, 2011 Match 29	Villa San Carlos	0–0 (4–5 p)	El Porvenir

September 14, 2011 Match 30	Tristán Suárez	0–0 (5–4 p)	Leandro N. Alem

September 7, 2011 Match 31	Argentino (M)	3–1	Liniers

September 7, 2011 Match 32	Talleres (RE)	1–1 (2–4 p)	Central Córdoba (R)

September 7, 2011 Match 33	Excursionistas	1–1 (8–7 p)	J.J. Urquiza

September 7, 2011 Match 34	Deportivo Laferrere	2–2 (4–3 p)	Berazategui

==== Interior Zone ====
The Interior Zone featured the twenty-five teams from the Torneo Argentino A, the sixty teams from the Torneo Argentino B, and two invited teams. The forty-one winners advanced to the Third Round. The matches were played on September 6–8, 2011.

September 7, 2011 Match 35	Boca Río Gallegos	2–0	Real Madrid (RG)
14:00				Referee: Héctor Nievas

September 7, 2011 Match 36	Deportivo Madryn	1–2	Racing (T)
15:00				Referee: Daniel Montero

September 7, 2011 Match 37	Huracán (CR)	1–0	Jorge Newbery (CR)
16:00				Referee: Alejandro Sepulveda

September 7, 2011 Match 38	Cipolleti	2–3	Deportivo Roca
21:00				Referee: Gustavo Cursini

September 7, 2011 Match 39	Cruz del Sur	1–0	Maronese
16:00				Referee: Hérctor Aburto

September 7, 2011 Match 40	Villa Mitre	1–0	Alvear
20:00				Referee: Facundo Elegart

September 7, 2011 Match 41	Santamarina	2–2 (5–3 p)	Bella Vista (BB)
20:30				Referee: Federico Presa

September 8, 2011 Match 42	Unión (MdP)	2–0	Liniers (BB)
15:00				Referee: Facundo Díaz

September 7, 2011 Match 43	Alvarado	1–1 (3–2 p)	Independiente (T)
20:00				Referee: Diego Tadiello

September 7, 2011 Match 44	Huracán (TA)	0–0 (4–1 p)	El Linqueño
16:00				Referee: Fernando Marconi

September 7, 2011 Match 45	Rivadavia	2–0	La Emilia
16:00				Referee: Eliseo Acosta

September 7, 2011 Match 46	Douglas Haig	2–1	Ferrocarril Sud (O)
20:30				Referee: G. Cedro Méndez

September 7, 2011 Match 47	Racing (O)	5–0	Grupo Universitario (T)
21:00				Referee: Santiago Ascenzi

September 7, 2011 Match 48	Defensores de Belgrano (VR)	2–0	Once Tigres
20:30				Referee: Marcos Bocci

September 7, 2011 Match 49	Juventud Unida (G)	0–1	San Jorge
20:45				Referee: Lucas Gómez

September 7, 2011 Match 50	Paraná	1–1 (4–3 p)	Jorge Newbery (VT)
21:00				Referee: Daniel Asenjo

September 7, 2011 Match 51	Unión (S)	1–1 (0–3 p)	9 de Julio (R)
20:30				Referee: Carlos Boxler

September 8, 2011 Match 52	Libertad	2–0	Ben Hur

September 7, 2011 Match 53	Colegiales (C)	0–0 (1–4 p)	Las Heras (C)
20:30				Referee: Gastón Freyre

September 7, 2011 Match 54	Gimnasia (CdU)	3–2	Defensores (P)
21:00				Referee: Jorge Sosa

September 7, 2011 Match 55	Sportivo Patria	1–0	Chaco For Ever
16:00				Referee: Sergio Pérez

September 6, 2011 Match 56	Sarmiento (R)	0–0 (4–3 p)	San Martin (F)
16:00				Referee: Martín Mendoza

September 7, 2011 Match 57	Textil Mandiyú	0–0 (2–3 p)	Guaraní Antonio Franco
16:00				Referee: Gustavo Muchutti

September 7, 2011 Match 58	Crucero del Norte	0–0 (4–3 p)	Jorge Gibson Brown (P)
20:30				Referee: Ángel Ayala

September 7, 2011 Match 59	Tiro Federal (M)	0–0 (5–4 p)	9 de Julio (M)
21:30				Referee: Juan Pablo González

September 7, 2011 Match 60	Talleres (C)	4–1	General Paz Juniors
21:00				Referee: Carlos Córdoba

September 7, 2011 Match 61	Sarmiento (C)	1–1 (3–2 p)	Origone (JP)
21:00				Referee: Dario Españón

September 7, 2011 Match 62	Estudiantes (RC)	1–1 (2–4 p)	Atenas
				Referee: Julio Quinteros

September 7, 2011 Match 63	Racing (C)	1–0	Riojano
16:00				Referee: Andrés Merlos

September 7, 2011 Match 64	Juventud Unida Universitario	0–0 (5–3 p)	Gimnasia (M)
21:00				Referee: Mario Ejarque

September 7, 2011 Match 65	Alumni	3–1	Sportivo Las Parejas
21:00				Referee: Pascual Fernández

September 6, 2011 Match 66	Trinidad	1–0	Sportivo Del Bono
21:30				Referee: Reinoso Rivero

September 7, 2011 Match 67	Juventud Alianza	0–0 (4–5 p)	Unión (VK)
16:00				Referee: Eugenio Yevcin

September 7, 2011 Match 68	Huracán (LH)	1–2	Guaymallén
21:30				Referee: Nelson Benites

September 8, 2011 Match 69	Deportivo Maipú	0–0 (4–3 p)	San Martín (M)
21:00				Referee: Alejandro Arco

September 7, 2011 Match 70	Policial	1–0	Villa Cubas (C)
17:00				Referee: Raúl Nolasco

September 8, 2011 Match 71	Central Córdoba (SdE)	2–1	Mitre (SdE)
22:00				Referee: Pedro Argarañaz

September 7, 2011 Match 72	Juventud Antoniana	1–0	Concepción
22:00				Referee: Francisco Acosta

September 7, 2011 Match 73	Gimnasia y Tiro	2–0	San Jorge (T)
22:00				Referee: Miguel Mazón

September 7, 2011 Match 74	Altos Hornos Zapla	0–0 (2–3 p)	Talleres (P)
21:30				Referee: Ariel Tello

September 7, 2011 Match 75	Sarmiento (SdE)	1–0	Concepción (BRS)
22:00				Referee: Néstor Cano

=== Third round ===
The Third Round featured the forty-one winners of the Second Round's Interior Zone plus five additional team. The twenty-three match winners advanced to the Fourth Round. The matches were played on September 14 and 15.

September 14, 2011 Match 76	Racing (T)	0–0 (4–3 p)	Boca Río Gallegos
		Report

September 14, 2011 Match 77	CAI	1–1 (3–5 p)	Huracán (CR)
		Report

September 14, 2011 Match 78	Deportivo Roca	1–0	Cruz del Sur
		Report

September 14, 2011 Match 79	Santamarina	1–0	Villa Mitre
		Report

September 15, 2011 Match 80	Alvarado	1–2	Unión (MdP)	Mar del Plata, Buenos Aires
		Report		Stadium: Estadio José María Minella

September 14, 2011 Match 81	Rivadavia	2–2 (3–4 p)	Huracán (TA)
		Report

September 14, 2011 Match 82	Tiro Federal	2–2 (2–3 p)	Douglas Haig

September 14, 2011 Match 83	Racing (O)	1–0	Defensores de Belgrano (VR)
		Report

September 14, 2011 Match 84	Paraná	1–0	San Jorge (SF)
		Report

September 14, 2011 Match 85	Libertad (S)	0–0 (4–3 p)	9 de Julio (R)
		Report

September 14, 2011 Match 86	Gimnasia (CdU)	3–0	Las Heras (C)
		Report

September 14, 2011 Match 87	Sarmiento (R)	4–1	Sportivo Patria

September 14, 2011 Match 88	Crucero del Norte	2–1	Guaraní Antonio Franco
		Report

September 13, 2011 Match 89	Sportivo Belgrano	4–2	Tiro Federal (M)
		Report		Referee: Diego Gallo

September 13, 2011 Match 90	Talleres (C)	0–0 (4–3 p)	Sarmiento (C)	Córdoba, Córdoba
		Report		Stadium: Estadio La Boutique; Referee: Francisco Acosta

September 15, 2011 Match 91	Racing (C)	2–1	Atenas
		Report

September 21, 2011 Match 92	Juventud Unida Universitario	1–0	Alumni
		Report

September 15, 2011 Match 93	Trinidad	1–1 (2–4 p)	Unión (VK)
		Report

September 14, 2011 Match 94	Deportivo Maipú	0–1	Guaymallén
		Report

September 15, 2011 Match 95	Central Córdoba (SdE)	0–0 (0–2 p)	Policial
		Report

September 14, 2011 Match 96	Juventud Antoniana	0–0 (4–5 p)	Gimnasia y Tiro	Salta, Salta
		Report		Stadium: Padre Martearena; Referee: Federico Guaymas

September 21, 2011 Match 97	Central Norte	2–0	Talleres (P)
		Report

September 15, 2011 Match 98	San Martín (T)	4–0	Sarmiento (SdE)
		Report

=== Fourth round ===
The Fourth Round will feature the forty-eight teams that advance from the Second and Third Stages. The teams will be drawn into twenty-four matches. The winners of matches will advance to the Round of 64. The matches will be played from September 21 to 29.

September 28, 2011 Match 99	Tristán Suárez	0–1	El Porvenir

September 28, 2011 Match 100	Comunicaciones	1–2	Colegiales

September 28, 2011 Match 101	Deportivo Laferrere	1–1 (3–4 p)	Sacachispas

September 28, 2011 Match 102	San Martín (T)	1–1 (2–4 p)	Policial

September 28, 2011 Match 103	Sportivo Belgrano	1–0	Douglas Haig

September 28, 2011 Match 104	Unión (VK)	2–2 (3–1 p)	Juventud Unida Universitario

September 28, 2011 Match 105	Libertad (S)	0–3	Central Córdoba (R)

September 28, 2011 Match 106	Santamarina	1–0	Unión (MdP)

September 28, 2011 Match 107	Crucero del Norte	1–1 (4–5 p)	Sarmiento (R)

September 28, 2011 Match 108	Paraná	2–1	Gimnasia (CdU)

September 28, 2011 Match 109	Talleres (C)	1–0	Racing (C)

September 28, 2011 Match 110	Gimnasia y Tiro	2–4	Central Norte

October 4, 2011 Match 111	Argentino (M)	1–1 (1–2 p)	Excursionistas

October 4, 2011 Match 112	Deportivo Morón	0–1	Sarmiento (J)

October 5, 2011 Match 113	Huracán (TA)	1–3	Racing (O)

October 5, 2011 Match 114	General Lamadrid	2–1	Nueva Chicago

October 5, 2011 Match 115	Sportivo Italiano	1–1 (2–0 p)	Temperley

October 5, 2011 Match 116	Villa Dálmine	1–1 (3-1 p)	Platense

October 5, 2011 Match 117	San Telmo	0–0 (2–4 p)	Barracas Central

October 5, 2011 Match 118	Deportivo Roca	0–0 (1–4 p)	Guaymallén

October 5, 2011 Match 119	Huracán (CR)	1–1 (2–4 p)	Racing (T)

October 11, 2011 Match 120	Almagro	0–1	Defensores de Belgrano

October 12, 2011 Match 121	Estudiantes (BA)	2–2 (5–3 p)	Defensores de Cambaceres

October 12, 2011 Match 122	Acassuso	0–0 (2–4 p)	Deportivo Riestra

== Final phase ==
The Final Phase will consist of the Round of 64, Round of 32, Round of 16, quarterfinals, semifinals, and the Final. Beginning in the Round of 64, the sixty-four qualified teams will be split into four groups. Each group will consist of five Primera División teams, five Primera B Nacional teams, and six winners from the Fourth Round. Each group will contest their matches in a specific location chosen by the organizing committee. The draw took place on October 27, 2011.

=== Brackets ===
==== Group 1 ====
Round of 64
Vélez Sársfield	2
Racing (T)	0
Guillermo Brown	0
Rosario Central	1
Belgrano	3
Sacachispas	0
Colegiales	0
Independiente	4
Olimpo	2
Central Norte	1
Excursionistas	0 (4)
Huracán	0 (3)
Boca Unidos	1 (5)
Central Córdoba (R)	1 (6)
Boca Juniors	1 (4)
Santamarina	1 (3)

Round of 32
Vélez Sársfield	1 (4)
Rosario Central	1 (5)
Belgrano	2
Independiente	0
Olimpo	1 (5)
Excursionistas	1 (4)
Central Córdoba (R)	0
Boca Juniors	2

Round of 16
Rosario Central	2
Belgrano	1
Olimpo	1 (10)
Boca Juniors	1 (11)

Quarterfinals
Rosario Central	1 (2)
Boca Juniors	1 (4)

==== Group 2 ====
Round of 64
Estudiantes (LP)	2
Unión (VK)	1
Guaymallén	0
Deportivo Merlo	2
San Martin (SJ)	0
Sarmiento (J)	1
Talleres (C)	1
Colón	2
Tigre	4
Defensa y Justicia	2
Desamparados	0
Gimnasia (LP)	1
Aldosivi	1 (5)
Independiente Rivadavia	1 (3)
Racing (O)	0
Argentinos Juniors	3

Round of 32
Estudiantes (LP)	0 (4)
Deportivo Merlo	0 (5)
Sarmiento (J)	1
Colón	0
Tigre	1 (4)
Gimnasia (LP)	1 (1)
Aldosivi	0
Argentinos Juniors	2

Round of 16
Deportivo Merlo	2
Sarmiento (J)	1
Tigre	1
Argentinos Juniors	0

Quarterfinals
Deportivo Merlo	2
Tigre	1

==== Group 3 ====
Round of 64
Lanús	0 (7)
Barracas Central	0 (8)
Policial	4
Instituto	1
Unión	1
Chacarita Juniors	2
Villa Dálmine	1
San Lorenzo	2
All Boys	1 (3)
Atlanta	1 (4)
Deportivo Riestra	0 (3)
Quilmes	0 (5)
Almirante Brown	2 (3)
Sportivo Belgrano	2 (5)
Defensores de Belgrano	0
River Plate	1

Round of 32
Barracas Central	4
Policial	0
Chacarita Juniors	1 (1)
San Lorenzo	1 (3)
Atlanta	1
Quilmes	2
Sportivo Belgrano	0
River Plate	2

Round of 16
Barracas Central	1 (4)
San Lorenzo	1 (5)
Quilmes	1
River Plate	2

Quarterfinals
San Lorenzo	0
River Plate	2

==== Group 4 ====
Round of 64
Godoy Cruz	1 (2)
Sportivo Italiano	1 (4)
Estudiantes (BA)	2
Atlético Tucumán	3
Atlético de Rafaela	0 (4)
Ferro Carril Oeste	0 (2)
Paraná	1
Banfield	2
Racing	2
El Porvenir	0
Patronato	0 (5)
Newell's Old Boys	0 (4)
Gimnasia (J)	0
Sarmiento (R)	1
General Lamadrid	1
Arsenal	2

Round of 32
Sportivo Italiano	0 (3)
Atlético Tucumán	0 (4)
Atlético de Rafaela	2
Banfield	0
Racing	3
Patronato	1
Sarmiento (R)	2
Arsenal	1

Round of 16
Atlético Tucumán	0 (4)
Atlético de Rafaela	0 (3)
Racing	2
Sarmiento (R)	0

Quarterfinals
Atlético Tucumán	0
Racing	1

==== Semifinals and Final ====
Semifinals
1	Boca Juniors	1 (5)
4	Deportivo Merlo	1 (4)
3	River Plate	0 (4)
2	Racing	0 (5)

Final
Boca Juniors	2
Racing	1

June 3, 2012	Boca Juniors	1–1 (5–4 p)	Deportivo Merlo	Estadio Bicentenario Ciudad de Catamarca, Catamarca
16:30 UTC-03:00	Riquelme 57'		Friedrich 90'	Referee: Luis Álvarez
	Penalties
	Riquelme (penalty scored); Silva (penalty scored); Somoza (penalty scored); Mouche (penalty scored); Caruzzo (penalty scored)		(penalty scored) Conti; (penalty scored) Manchot; (penalty scored) Yeri; (penalty missed) Friedrich; (penalty scored) Lázzaro

Tied 1–1 after regular time, Boca Juniors advanced 5–4 on penalty shootout.

June 3, 2012	River Plate	0–0 (4–5 p)	Racing	Estadio Padre Ernesto Martearena, Salta
19:00 UTC-03:00				Referee: Alejandro Toia
	Penalties
	Ponzio (penalty scored); Funes Mori (penalty scored); Ocampos (penalty scored); Ledesma (penalty scored); Villalva (penalty missed); Vila (penalty missed)		(penalty scored) Saja; (penalty missed) Moreno; (penalty scored) Viola; (penalty scored) Pillud; (penalty scored) Hauche; (penalty scored) Fariña

Tied 0–0 after regular time, Racing Club advanced 5–4 on penalty shootout.

August 8, 2012	Boca Juniors	2–1	Racing	Estadio San Juan del Bicentenario, San Juan
20:30 UTC−3	Silva 21'; Viatri 62'		Viola 68'	Referee: Pablo Lunati

== Top goalscorers ==
Pos	Player	Club	Goals
1
1	(Argentina) Ramón Ábila	Sarmiento de Junín	3
1	(Argentina) Neri Bandiera	Sarmiento de Resistencia	3
1	(Argentina) Matías Recio	Sarmiento de Resistencia	3
1	(Argentina) Joaquín Cabral	Rivadavia de Lincoln	3
1	(Argentina) Fernando Benítez	Atlético Paraná	3
1	(Argentina) Mauro Conochiari	Sportivo Belgrano	3
1	(Argentina) Gonzalo Rodríguez	San Martín de Tucumán	3
1	(Argentina) Gonzalo Garavano	Atlético Tucumán	3
