= 2010–11 Argentine Primera División season =

120th season of top-tier football league in Argentina

Primera División
- Season: 2010–11
- Champions: Apertura: Estudiantes (LP) (6th title); Clausura: Vélez Sársfield (8th title)
- Relegated: Gimnasia y Esgrima (LP); Huracán; Quilmes; River Plate
- 2011 Copa Libertadores: Estudiantes (LP); Vélez Sársfield; Godoy Cruz
- 2012 Copa Libertadores: Vélez Sársfield
- 2011 Copa Sudamericana: Vélez Sársfield; Estudiantes (LP); Godoy Cruz; Lanús; Arsenal; Argentinos Juniors
- Matches: 380
- Goals: 879 (2.31 per match)
- Top goalscorer: Apertura: Santiago Silva; Denis Stracqualursi (11 goals each); Clausura: Javier Cámpora; Teófilo Gutiérrez (11 goals each); Season: Denis Stracqualursi (21 goals)
- Biggest home win: Veléz Sársfield 6–0 Colón (10 October 2010)
- Biggest away win: Godoy Cruz 0–4 Veléz Sársfield (5 December 2010); River Plate 0–4 Estudiantes (LP) (8 December 2010); Colón 0–4 Racing (13 March 2011); Estudiantes (LP) 0–4 Veléz Sársfield (30 April 2011)
- Highest scoring: Racing 4–3 Olimpo (5March 2011); Banfield 3–4 Quilmes (29 April 2011)

The 2010–11 Primera División season was the 120th season of top-flight professional football in Argentina. A total of 20 teams competed in two championships —the Apertura and Clausura— over the course of the season, which started on 6 August 2010 and ended on 30 June 2011, one day prior to the start of the 2011 Copa América, held in Argentina.

== Club information ==
Twenty clubs participated in the 2010–11 season. Chacarita Juniors and Atlético Tucumán were relegated at the end of the 2009–10 season. They were replaced by Olimpo and Quilmes, both of whom were promoted from the Primera B Nacional. Rosario Central and Gimnasia y Esgrima (LP) played in the relegation/promotion playoffs against All Boys and Atlético de Rafaela, respectively, to determine the other two teams for this season. Following those matches, Gimnasia stayed in the Primera División, while Rosario Central was relegated and replaced by All Boys.

During the season, Estudiantes used Estadio Centenario Dr. José Luis Meiszner in Quilmes and Estadio Ciudad de La Plata in La Plata since their home stadium, Estadio Jorge Luis Hirschi, was undergoing renovations.

Locations of the 2010−11 Primera División teams outside Greater Buenos Aires.
Locations of the 2010−11 Primera División teams within Greater Buenos Aires.

Club	City	Stadium	Capacity
All Boys	Buenos Aires	Islas Malvinas	21,000
Argentinos Juniors	Buenos Aires	Diego Armando Maradona	24,800
Arsenal	Sarandí	Julio H. Grondona	16,300
Banfield	Banfield	Florencio Solá	40,500
Boca Juniors	Buenos Aires	Alberto J. Armando	49,000
Colón	Santa Fe	Brigadier General Estanislao López	32,500
Estudiantes (LP)	La Plata	Estadio Jorge Luis Hirschi	23,000
Gimnasia y Esgrima (LP)	La Plata	Juan Carmelo Zerillo	24,544
Godoy Cruz	Godoy Cruz	Malvinas Argentinas	40,268
Huracán	Buenos Aires	Tomás Adolfo Ducó	48,314
Independiente	Avellaneda	Libertadores de América	32,500
Lanús	Lanús	Ciudad de Lanús - Néstor Díaz Pérez	46,619
Newell's Old Boys	Rosario	Marcelo Bielsa	38,095
Olimpo	Bahía Blanca	Roberto Natalio Carminatti	18,000
Quilmes	Quilmes	Centenario Dr. José Luis Meiszner	30,200
Racing	Avellaneda	Presidente Juan Domingo Perón	51,389
River Plate	Buenos Aires	Monumental Antonio V. Liberti	65,645
San Lorenzo	Buenos Aires	Pedro Bidegain	43,494
Tigre	Victoria	Monumental de Victoria	26,282
Vélez Sársfield	Buenos Aires	José Amalfitani	49,540

=== Personnel and kits ===
Club	Manager	Kit manufacturer	Main sponsor
All Boys	(Argentina) Pepe Romero	Signia	Lácteos Barraza
Argentinos Juniors	(Argentina) Pedro Troglio	Olympikus	Liderar Seguros
Arsenal	(Argentina) Gustavo Alfaro	Mitre	La Nueva Seguros
Banfield	(Argentina) Sebastián Ariel Méndez	Mitre	Bingo Lomas
Boca Juniors	(Argentina) Julio César Falcioni	Nike	LG
Colón	(Argentina) Mario Sciacqua	Umbro	Flecha Bus
Estudiantes (LP)	(Argentina) Eduardo Berizzo	Topper	RCA
Gimnasia y Esgrima (LP)	(Argentina) Hernán Darío Ortiz	Kappa/Penalty	RapiCuotas$/Liderar Seguros
Godoy Cruz	(Uruguay) Jorge da Silva	Lotto	Mendoza
Huracán	(Argentina) Roberto Pompei	Kappa	La Nueva Seguros
Independiente	(Argentina) Antonio Mohamed	Puma	Motomel
Lanús	(Argentina) Gabriel Schürrer	Olympikus	Bingo Lanús
Newell's Old Boys	(Argentina) Javier Torrente	Topper	Motomel
Olimpo	(Argentina) Omar De Felippe	Balonpie	Bingo Bahía
Quilmes	(Argentina) Ricardo Caruso Lombardi	Lotto	Quilmes
Racing	(Argentina) Miguel Ángel Russo	Olympikus	Banco Hipotecario
River Plate	(Argentina) Juan José López	Adidas	Petrobras
San Lorenzo	(Argentina) Omar Asad	Lotto	Walmart/La Nueva Seguros
Tigre	(Argentina) Rodolfo Arruabarrena	Kappa	Banco Macro
Vélez Sársfield	(Argentina) Ricardo Gareca	Penalty	Mondial

=== Transfers ===
See List of Argentine Primera División transfers July–August 2010.

=== Managerial changes ===
Team	Outgoing manager	Manner of departure	Date of vacancy	Replaced by	Date of appointment	Position in table
Pre-season changes
San Lorenzo	Sebastián Méndez (interim)	End of contract	14 May 2010	Ramón Díaz	25 May 2010	N/A
Boca Juniors	Roberto Pompei (interim)	End of contract	14 May 2010	Claudio Borghi	20 May 2010	N/A
Independiente	Américo Gallego	End of contract	18 May 2010	Daniel Garnero	20 May 2010	N/A
Argentinos Juniors	Claudio Borghi	End of contract	16 May 2010	Pedro Troglio	1 June 2010	N/A
Arsenal	Carlos Ruiz (interim)	End of contract	12 July 2010	Gustavo Alfaro	12 July 2010	N/A
Apertura changes
Independiente	Daniel Garnero	Resigned	20 September 2010	Antonio Mohamed	5 October 2010	17th
Huracán	Héctor Rivoira	Resigned	20 September 2010	Miguel Ángel Brindisi	22 September 2010	14th
Colón	Antonio Mohamed	Resigned	21 September 2010	Fernando Gamboa	27 September 2010	15th
Gimnasia y Esgrima (LP)	Diego Cocca	Resigned	29 September 2010	Pablo Morant (interim)	30 September 2010	19th
Quilmes	Hugo Tocalli	Resigned	15 October 2010	Leonardo Madelón	18 October 2010	19th
River Plate	Ángel Cappa	Sacked	8 November 2010	Juan José López	10 November 2010	11th
Lanús	Luis Zubeldía	Resigned	15 November 2010	Gabriel Schürrer	15 November 2010	14th
Boca Juniors	Claudio Borghi	Resigned	17 November 2010	Roberto Pompei (interim)	17 November 2010	15th
Inter-tournament changes
Godoy Cruz	Omar Asad	Resigned	14 December 2010	Jorge da Silva	15 December 2010	N/A
Gimnasia y Esgrima (LP)	Pablo Morant (interim)	End of contract	18 December 2010	Ángel Cappa	21 December 2010	N/A
Boca Juniors	Roberto Pompei (interim)	End of contract	18 December 2010	Julio César Falcioni	18 December 2010	N/A
Banfield	Julio César Falcioni	Resigned	18 December 2010	Sebastián Méndez	21 December 2010	N/A
Tigre	Ricardo Caruso Lombardi	Resigned	29 December 2010	Rodolfo Arruabarrena	5 January 2011	N/A
Estudiantes (LP)	Alejandro Sabella	Resigned	3 February 2011	Eduardo Berizzo	7 February 2011	N/A
Clausura changes
Huracán	Miguel Ángel Brindisi	Resigned	22 February 2011	Roberto Pompei	24 February 2011	18th
Quilmes	Leonardo Madelón	Resigned	6 March 2011	Ricardo Caruso Lombardi	8 March 2011	20th
Colón	Fernando Gamboa	Sacked	9 April 2011	Mario Sciacqua (interim)	11 April 2011	10th
Newell's Old Boys	Roberto Sensini	Resigned	10 April 2011	Javier Torrente	18 April 2011	19th
San Lorenzo	Ramón Díaz	Resigned	24 April 2011	Miguel Tojo (interim)	24 May 2011	11th
Gimnasia y Esgrima (LP)	Ángel Cappa	Sacked	1 May 2011	Darío Ortiz (interim)	2 May 2011	18th
Estudiantes (LP)	Eduardo Berizzo	Resigned	30 May2011	Luis Suárez and Guillermo Trama (interim)	30 May 2011	15th

== Torneo Apertura ==
The Torneo Apertura 2010 (known as the Torneo IVECO del Bicentenario Apertura 2010 for sponsorship reasons) was the first championship of the season. It began on 6 August and it ended on 6 February 2011. (Note: Due to the death of Néstor Kirchner, President of Argentina from 2003–2007, on 27 October, all matches for the following weekend were postponed. This pushed the match schedule for the remainder of the season back a week, changing the end of the tournament from 12 December to 19 December. The schedule was later adjusted again to end on 12 December as planned. Due to Independiente's participation in the 2010 Copa Sudamericana, their match against Tigre was postponed to 6 February 2011.)

=== Standings ===
Pos	Team	Pld	W	D	L	GF	GA	GD	Pts	Qualification
1	Estudiantes (LP)	19	14	3	2	32	8	+24	45	2011 Copa Libertadores Second Stage
2	Vélez Sarsfield	19	13	4	2	33	9	+24	43	
3	Arsenal	19	9	5	5	22	19	+3	32	
4	River Plate	19	8	7	4	21	18	+3	31	
5	Godoy Cruz	19	7	8	4	32	25	+7	29	
6	Racing	19	8	5	6	25	18	+7	29	
7	Lanús	19	8	4	7	20	25	−5	28	
8	All Boys	19	7	5	7	24	23	+1	26	
9	Newell's Old Boys	19	6	8	5	13	12	+1	26	
10	Colón	19	7	5	7	21	29	−8	26	
11	Tigre	19	7	4	8	24	24	0	25	
12	Boca Juniors	19	7	4	8	20	20	0	25	
13	Argentinos Juniors	19	6	6	7	22	21	+1	24	
14	San Lorenzo	19	6	6	7	18	20	−2	24	
15	Banfield	19	4	8	7	20	19	+1	20	
16	Quilmes	19	4	7	8	14	23	−9	19	
17	Olimpo	19	5	3	11	18	26	−8	18	
18	Huracán	19	4	4	11	16	33	−17	16	
19	Gimnasia y Esgrima (LP)	19	3	6	10	13	23	−10	15	
20	Independiente	19	2	8	9	13	26	−13	14	

Rules for classification: 1st points; 2nd goal difference; 3rd goals scored; 4th head-to-head points; 5th head-to-head goal difference; 6th head-to-head goals scored. This does not apply to determining the champion. If two or more teams had been tied in point at the end of the tournament, a playoff would have been held at a neutral venue within 72 hours for the championship.

Primera División
2010 Apertura champion

6th title

=== Results ===
Home \ Away	ALL	ARJ	ARS	BAN	BOC	COL	EST	GLP	GCR	HUR	IND	LAN	NOB	OLI	QUI	RAC	RIV	SLO	TIG	VEL
All Boys				2–1	2–0		2–1		2–2		3–1		2–0	1–0			1–0		3–3	1–2
Argentinos Juniors	1–0			1–0		3–0			0–0	1–2		1–2	1–2				0–0	1–0		
Arsenal	0–0	1–0		1–0		2–1			1–3	2–0		1–2	0–0					2–1		0–0
Banfield					0–0		0–0	0–0			4–0		0–0	2–1		1–2	2–2		1–1	2–3
Boca Juniors		0–2	2–1			3–1		1–1		2–0		1–2			1–0	1–2		1–2		2–1
Colón	1–1			0–1			1–1		1–3		1–1		1–0				1–2	2–0	1–0	
Estudiantes (LP)		3–1	2–0		1–0			2–0		2–0		3–0		2–0	2–0	2–0				
Gimnasia y Esgrima (LP)	3–1	2–4	2–3			0–0			1–3	3–0		0–2			1–0			0–0		0–0
Godoy Cruz				2–1	1–1		1–2				4–1		0–0	1–0		1–1	2–2		1–2	0–4
Huracán	1–1			2–2		1–2			1–1		1–0	1–2	1–1				0–1	3–0		
Independiente		1–1	1–2		0–0		1–2	1–0						1–1	0–0	1–0			0–1	
Lanús	1–0			0–0		1–2			1–4		0–0		1–1				1–4	2–0	2–0	
Newell's Old Boys					1–0		0–1	1–0			1–1			0–1	1–1	0–2	1–0		2–0	2–0
Olimpo		1–1	1–1		1–3	2–3		1–0		4–0		1–0			0–1	1–0				
Quilmes	2–1	2–2	0–1	0–2		1–1			2–1	1–2		1–1						1–0		0–2
Racing	1–0	2–1	2–2			1–2		2–0		3–0		4–0			1–1			1–2		0–2
River Plate			1–0		1–0		0–4	0–0			3–2			1–0	1–1	1–1			1–0	
San Lorenzo	3–1			2–1			0–1		2–2		1–1		0–0	3–1			0–0		2–0	0–0
Tigre		1–1	1–2		1–2		2–1	2–0		3–1				3–2	3–0	0–0				
Vélez Sarsfield		2–0				6–0	0–0		2–0	2–0	1–0	1–0		3–0			2–1		2–1	

Legend: Blue = home team win; Yellow = draw; Red = away team win.

=== Top goalscorers ===
Pos	Name	Player nationality	Club	Goals
1	Santiago Silva	Uruguayan	Vélez Sársfield	11
1	Denis Stracqualursi	Argentine	Tigre	11
3	Juan Manuel Martínez	Argentine	Vélez Sársfield	10
4	Mauro Matos	Argentine	All Boys	8
4	Martín Palermo	Argentine	Boca Juniors	8
4	David Ramírez	Argentine	Godoy Cruz	8
7	Iván Obolo	Argentine	Arsenal	7
8	Jairo Castillo	Colombian	Godoy Cruz	6
8	Gastón Fernández	Argentine	Estudiantes (LP)	6
8	Gabriel Hauche	Argentine	Racing	6

== Torneo Clausura ==
The Torneo Clausura 2011, officially called the Torneo Clausura Néstor Kirchner 2011, began on 11 February and ended on 19 June.

=== Standings ===
Pos	Team	Pld	W	D	L	GF	GA	GD	Pts	Qualification
1	Vélez Sarsfield	19	12	3	4	36	17	+19	39	2012 Copa Libertadores Second Stage
2	Lanús	19	10	5	4	28	15	+13	35	
3	Godoy Cruz	19	10	4	5	33	28	+5	34	
4	Olimpo	19	8	6	5	28	23	+5	30	
5	Argentinos Juniors	19	7	9	3	16	11	+5	30	
6	Independiente	19	7	8	4	30	20	+10	29	
7	Boca Juniors	19	7	7	5	24	22	+2	28	
8	Banfield	19	7	6	6	24	24	0	27	
9	River Plate	19	6	8	5	15	15	0	26	
10	Arsenal	19	6	7	6	25	22	+3	25	
11	Tigre	19	6	7	6	25	26	−1	25	
12	All Boys	19	7	4	8	14	19	−5	25	
13	Estudiantes (LP)	19	6	6	7	18	19	−1	24	
14	San Lorenzo	19	5	8	6	19	17	+2	23	
15	Racing	19	7	2	10	25	26	−1	23	
16	Colón	19	6	3	10	20	27	−7	21	
17	Quilmes	19	5	5	9	24	27	−3	20	
18	Gimnasia y Esgrima (LP)	19	3	9	7	19	25	−6	18	
19	Newell's Old Boys	19	4	4	11	16	32	−16	16	
20	Huracán	19	3	5	11	18	42	−24	14	

Rules for classification: 1st points; 2nd goal difference; 3rd goals scored; 4th head-to-head points; 5th head-to-head goal difference; 6th head-to-head goals scored. This does not apply to determining the champion. If two or more teams had been tied in point at the end of the tournament, a playoff would have been held at a neutral venue within 72 hours for the championship.

Primera División
2011 Clausura champion

8th title

=== Results ===
Home \ Away	ALL	ARJ	ARS	BAN	BOC	COL	EST	GLP	GCR	HUR	IND	LAN	NOB	OLI	QUI	RAC	RIV	SLO	TIG	VEL
All Boys		0–0	1–0			0–2		1–0		3–1		0–0			1–0	0–1		0–3		
Argentinos Juniors			1–0		0–2		0–0	1–1			0–0			0–1	0–0	2–1			1–1	1–1
Arsenal					2–2		1–0	1–1			3–0			2–0	2–2	1–2	1–1		2–0	
Banfield	3–1	0–2	1–0			1–1			1–1	2–2		2–1			3–4			1–1		
Boca Juniors	0–0			1–1			2–1		1–4		1–1		1–0	0–2			2–0		3–3	
Colón		1–2	0–1		0–1			1–3		3–0		0–1		0–2	2–0	0–4				1–1
Estudiantes (LP)	3–0			0–1		0–2			0–1		0–2		2–1				1–1	0–0	2–2	0–4
Gimnasia y Esgrima (LP)				2–0	2–2		0–2				1–2		1–2	1–3		0–0	0–0		2–1	
Godoy Cruz	1–0	1–0	1–4			2–3		2–2		3–1		2–0			2–0			0–2		
Huracán		1–1	1–1		0–3		0–3	2–0						1–2	2–1	0–0			3–2	0–2
Independiente	2–2			1–1		3–1			3–0	5–1		1–2	4–0				0–1	1–1		2–2
Lanús		0–1	3–1		2–0		0–0	0–0		3–0				1–1	2–1	4–1				3–2
Newell's Old Boys	1–0	0–2	2–2	0–1		1–0			1–3	3–3		2–1						0–0		
Olimpo	1–0			2–1			2–2		3–3		1–2		1–1				0–0	0–1	2–2	1–2
Quilmes					2–2		0–1	2–2			1–1		3–1	0–1		2–0	0–1		1–2	
Racing				1–3	0–1		0–1		2–3		2–0		3–0	4–3			0–1		1–2	
River Plate	0–2	0–0		1–0		1–1			1–2	2–0		1–2	2–1					1–1		1–2
San Lorenzo		1–2	1–1		1–0	1–2		1–1		3–0		1–1			0–2	1–2				
Tigre	0–1			1–2		3–0			2–2		0–0	0–3	1–0				0–0	1–0		2–1
Vélez Sarsfield	1–2		3–0	2–0	1–0			2–0	2–0				2–0		2–3	2–1		2–0		

Source: universofutbol.com
Legend: Blue = home team win; Yellow = draw; Red = away team win.

=== Top goalscorers ===
Rank	Name	Player nationality	Club	Goals
1	Juan Manuel Martinez	Argentine	Velez	11
1	Teófilo Gutiérrez	Colombian	Racing	11
3	Denis Stracqualursi	Argentine	Tigre	10
4	Esteban Fuertes	Argentine	Colón	9
4	Iván Obolo	Argentine	Arsenal	9
6	David Ramírez	Argentine	Vélez Sársfield	8
6	Silvio Romero	Argentine	Lanús	8
6	Diego Valeri	Argentine	Lanús	8
9	Facundo Parra	Argentine	Independiente	7
9	Santiago Silva	Uruguayan	Vélez Sársfield	7

== Relegation ==
Pos	Team	2008–09 Pts	2009–10 Pts	2010–11 Pts	Total Pts	Total Pld	Avg	Relegation
1	Vélez Sársfield	66	61	82	209	114	1.833	
2	Lanús	75	60	63	198	114	1.737	
3	Estudiantes (LP)	57	71	69	197	114	1.728	
4	Banfield	46	73	47	166	114	1.456	
5	Godoy Cruz	49	53	63	165	114	1.447	
6	Argentinos Juniors	38	73	54	165	114	1.447	
7	Newell's Old Boys	52	69	42	163	114	1.43	
8	San Lorenzo	63	52	47	162	114	1.421	
9	Boca Juniors	61	47	53	161	114	1.412	
10	Colón	57	55	47	159	114	1.395	
11	All Boys	—	—	51	51	38	1.342	
12	Racing	52	46	52	150	114	1.316	
13	Independiente	39	68	43	150	114	1.316	
14	Arsenal	46	46	57	149	114	1.307	
15	Tigre	62	32	50	144	114	1.263	
16	Olimpo	—	—	48	48	38	1.263	
17	River Plate	41	43	57	141	114	1.237	Relegation Playoff Matches
18	Gimnasia y Esgrima (LP)	55	37	33	125	114	1.096	Additional Playoff
19	Huracán	58	37	30	125	114	1.096	Additional Playoff
20	Quilmes	—	—	39	39	38	1.026	Primera B Nacional

=== Playoff for relegation/promotion playoff 1 ===
Since Huracán and Gimnasia (La Plata) finished with the same relegation co-efficient at the dividing line, a one-match playoff was held to determine who had to play in the relegation/promotion playoffs and who had to be directly relegated to the Primera B Nacional. The match was played on 22 June 2011 at Estadio Alberto J. Armando in Buenos Aires. Gimnasia won the match 2–0 and continued to the relegation/promotion playoff against San Martín de San Juan; Huracán was relegated to the Primera B Nacional.

Team 1	Score	Team 2
Huracán	0–2	Gimnasia y Esgrima (LP)

=== Relegation/promotion playoffs ===
The 17th and 18th placed teams in the relegation table (River Plate and Gimnasia y Esgrima (LP), respectively) played the 3rd and 4th-place finishers of the 2010–11 Primera B Nacional season (San Martín (SJ) and Belgrano, respectively), the winner of each claiming a spot in the following Primera División season. The Primera División team (Team 1) played the second leg at home. Both San Martín de San Juan and Belgrano defeated their Primera División counterparts—Gimnasia de La Plata and River Plate, respectively—to earn promotion to the Primera División for the 2011–12 season. Of historic note, this is the first time River Plate got relegated to the Primera B Nacional.

Team 1	Agg.	Team 2	1st leg	2nd leg
Relegation/promotion playoff 1
Gimnasia y Esgrima (LP)	1–2	San Martín (SJ)	0–1	1–1
Relegation/promotion playoff 2
Belgrano	3–1	River Plate	2–0	1–1

== International qualification ==
=== Copa Libertadores ===
The 2010 Clausura champion (Argentinos Juniors) and the 2010 Apertura champion (Estudiantes de La Plata) earned a berth to the 2011 Copa Libertadores. Independiente won the 2010 Copa Sudamericana and earned a berth into the competition. The remaining two berths were determined by an aggregate table of the 2010 Clausura and 2010 Apertura tournaments.

Pos	Team	Pld	W	D	L	GF	GA	GD	Pts	Qualification
1	Estudiantes (LP)	38	26	7	5	65	22	+43	85	2011 Copa Libertadores Second Stage (Note: Argentinos Juniors and Estudiantes qualified as the 2010 Clausura and 2010 Apertura champion, respectively.)
2	Vélez Sarsfield	38	20	10	8	58	29	+29	70	2011 Copa Libertadores Second Stage
3	Godoy Cruz	38	18	12	8	62	39	+23	66	2011 Copa Libertadores Second Stage
4	Argentinos Juniors	38	18	11	9	57	44	+13	65	2011 Copa Libertadores Second Stage
5	Racing	38	17	7	14	46	40	+6	58	
6	Lanús	38	16	9	13	45	48	−3	57	
7	Newell's Old Boys	38	14	14	10	45	30	+15	56	
8	River Plate	38	14	11	13	37	39	−2	53	
9	Banfield	38	13	13	12	44	35	+9	52	
10	Arsenal	38	14	9	15	41	52	−11	51	
11	Tigre	38	14	7	17	52	50	+2	49	
12	Independiente	38	12	12	14	38	44	−6	48	2011 Copa Libertadores First Stage (Note: Independiente qualified as the 2010 Copa Sudamericana champion.)
13	Colón	38	11	14	13	41	61	−20	47	
14	Boca Juniors	38	12	9	17	48	55	−7	45	
15	San Lorenzo	38	12	8	18	44	41	+3	44	
16	Huracán	38	11	9	18	37	55	−18	42	
17	All Boys	19	7	5	7	24	23	+1	26	
18	Quilmes	19	4	7	8	14	23	−9	19	
19	Olimpo	19	5	3	11	18	26	−8	18	

Rules for classification: 1st points; 2nd goal difference; 3rd goals scored; 4th head-to-head points; 5th head-to-head goal difference; 6th head-to-head goals scored.
Gimnasia de La Plata was ineligible for the competition for having participated in the promotion/relegation playoffs following the 2009–10 season.

=== Copa Sudamericana ===
Qualification for the 2011 Copa Sudamericana was determined by an aggregate table of the Apertura 2010 and Clausura 2011 tournaments.

Pos	Team	Pld	W	D	L	GF	GA	GD	Pts	Qualification
1	Vélez Sarsfield	38	25	7	6	69	26	+43	82	2011 Copa Sudamericana Second Stage
2	Estudiantes (LP)	38	20	9	9	50	27	+23	69	2011 Copa Sudamericana Second Stage
3	Godoy Cruz	38	17	12	9	65	53	+12	63	2011 Copa Sudamericana Second Stage
4	Lanús	38	18	9	11	49	41	+8	63	2011 Copa Sudamericana Second Stage
5	Arsenal	38	15	12	11	47	41	+6	57	2011 Copa Sudamericana Second Stage
6	River Plate	38	14	15	9	36	33	+3	57	Cannot qualify for the Copa Sudamericana (Note: River Plate was ineligible for the competition since they were played the Relegation Play off or Relegated directly to the B Nacional.)
7	Argentinos Juniors	38	13	15	10	38	32	+6	54	2011 Copa Sudamericana Second Stage
8	Boca Juniors	38	14	11	13	44	42	+2	53	
9	Racing	38	15	7	16	50	43	+7	52	
10	All Boys	38	14	9	15	38	42	−4	51	
11	Tigre	38	13	11	14	49	50	−1	50	
12	Olimpo	38	13	9	16	44	49	−5	48	
13	Banfield	38	11	14	13	44	43	+1	47	
14	San Lorenzo	38	11	14	13	37	37	0	47	
15	Colón	38	13	8	17	41	56	−15	47	
16	Independiente	38	9	16	13	43	46	−3	43	2011 Copa Sudamericana Round of 16 (Note: Independiente qualified as the 2010 Copa Sudamericana champion.)
17	Newell's Old Boys	38	10	12	16	29	43	−14	42	
18	Quilmes	38	9	12	17	38	50	−12	39	
19	Gimnasia y Esgrima (LP)	38	6	15	17	32	48	−16	33	
20	Huracán	38	7	9	22	34	75	−41	30	

Rules for classification: 1st points; 2nd goal difference; 3rd goals scored; 4th head-to-head points; 5th head-to-head goal difference; 6th head-to-head goals scored.

== See also ==
- 2010–11 in Argentine football
