= Racing Club =

Racing Club may refer to:

== Football ==
Alphabetical by country

- Racing Club de Avellaneda, Argentina
- Racing de Córdoba, Argentina
- Racing de Olavarría, Argentina
- Racing de Trelew, Argentina
- K.R.C. Genk, Belgium
- KRC Genk Ladies, Belgium
- RC Bafoussam, Cameroon
- Racing Club Warwick F.C., England
- Racing Club de France Football, France
- RC Lens, France
- RC Lens Féminin, France
- RC Strasbourg Alsace, France
- Racing CH, Haiti
- RC Abidjan, Ivory Coast
- Racing Club Beirut, Lebanon
- Racing FC Union Luxembourg, Luxembourg
- Racing de Casablanca, Morocco
- Racing Club Portuense, Spain
- Racing de Ferrol, Spain
- Racing de Madrid, Spain
- Racing de Santander, Spain
- Racing Louisville FC, United States
- Racing Club de Montevideo, Uruguay

== Rugby union ==
- Racing 92, the successor club to the rugby union section of Racing Club de France
- RC Narbonne, France
