= Daniel Tílger =

Argentine footballer

Personal information
- Full name: Daniel Alberto Tílger
- Date of birth: August 3, 1970 (age 56)
- Place of birth: Ciudad Evita, Argentina
- Height: 1.77 m (5 ft 10 in)
- Position: Striker

Senior career*
Years	Team	Apps	(Gls)
1989–1990	Boca Juniors	7	(0)
1991	Once Caldas	22	(10)
1992–1994	Independiente Santa Fe	63	(31)
1994–1995	América de Cali	37	(13)
1996	Deportes Quindío	34	(21)
1997	Deportivo Cali	27	(8)
1997–1998	Junior	38	(17)
1999	Millonarios	37	(14)
1999–2001	Unión	57	(24)
2002	Argentinos Juniors	15	(2)
2002–2004	Nueva Chicago	57	(18)
2004–2005	Lanús	20	(5)
2005–2006	Tiro Federal	16	(2)
2007	El Porvenir	13	(7)
2008–2010	Durazno FC	30	(17)
2011	Ferro Carril Sud	12	(4)
2011–2012	Atlético Policial	9	(6)
- * Club domestic league appearances and goals as of August 6, 2012

Daniel Alberto Tílger (born August 3, 1970) is an Argentine retired football striker who spent most of his career playing in the Colombian league.

== Club career ==
Tílger has an extensive career in football. He began professionally at giant Boca Juniors in 1989, but his chances to play were few. In 1991, he moved to Colombia, where he spent the next eight years playing for several first division clubs including Deportes Quindío, Independiente Santa Fe, Deportivo Cali, Millonarios and América de Cali among others. In the Colombian league he built up his reputation as a charismatic and controversial players that got in trouble more than once. However, on the field he proved to be a lethal striker that scored over 100 goals in league play.

In 1999, he returned to Argentina and signed for Unión de Santa Fe. In 2002, he transferred to Argentinos Juniors, before joining Nueva Chicago where he play until 2004. After his spell at Mataderos, he was hired by Lanús. As a granate Tílger played until June 2005, and subsequently signed for Tiro Federal where he finished his era in the Argentine Primera División in 2006. The following year, he continued playing in the regionalised third tier, the Primera B Metropolitana with El Porvenir. In 2008 Tílger went across the Río de la Plata and joined Uruguayan second division club Durazno FC. He retired from the sport at age 42 while playing for Atlético Policial in the Argentine fourth division.

== 1999 Incident ==
In November 1999, while playing for Millonarios in the semi-finals of Copa Mustang against his former team Once Caldas, Tílger got involved in a scandal of large proportions. When he scored on Once Caldas goalie Juan Carlos Henao, Tílger approached Henao with a ridicule dance move trying to provoke him, Henao pushed him back and Tílger dropped to the floor faking an act of aggression by the Colombian goalkeeper. Since the referee didn't intervene at that point, he stood up and abruptly squeezed Henao's genitals. After the shameful incident was witnessed by the line-man, Tílger was sent off the field, and in addition he received a nine-game suspension by the league.
