= Denis Stracqualursi =

Argentine footballer

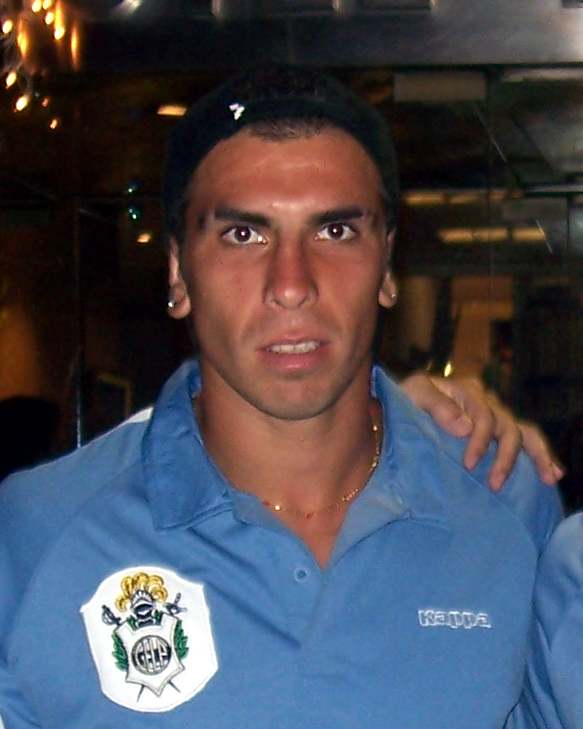
- Stracqualursi with Gimnasia-LP

Personal information
- Full name: Denis Andrés Stracqualursi
- Date of birth: 20 October 1987 (age 39)
- Place of birth: Rafaela, Argentina
- Height: 1.91 m (6 ft 3 in)
- Position: Forward

Team information
- Current team: Unión de Sunchales

Senior career*
Years	Team	Apps	(Gls)
2007–2008	Unión de Sunchales	24	(11)
2008–2010	Gimnasia-LP	44	(6)
2010–2012	Tigre	38	(21)
2011–2012	→ Everton (loan)	20	(1)
2012–2013	San Lorenzo	31	(8)
2013–2014	Emelec	29	(15)
2014–2015	Baniyas	20	(7)
2015	Lanús	12	(0)
2016	Emelec	25	(4)
2017	Santa Fe	18	(1)
2017–2018	Tigre	19	(0)
2018–2019	Aldosivi	13	(2)
2019–2020	Atlético Rafaela	16	(0)
2020	Taranto	4	(1)
2020–2021	Città di Fasano	9	(0)
2021–	Unión de Sunchales	9	(1)
- * Club domestic league appearances and goals as of 14:11, 25 January 2022 (UTC)

Denis Andrés Stracqualursi (born 20 October 1987) is an Argentine professional footballer who plays as a forward for Unión de Sunchales.

== Career ==
Stracqualursi started his playing career in 2007 with Unión de Sunchales in the 3rd division of Argentine football. In 2008, he joined Gimnasia y Esgrima de La Plata, he scored his first goal for the club in a 1–0 win over Colón de Santa Fe.

On 3 February 2010, Stracqualursi scored 2 goals to help Gimnasia win the Clásico Platense 3–1, ending Estudiantes' run of five consecutive victories.

Stracqualursi joined Tigre for the 2010–11 Argentine Primera División season on a one-year loan with the option to buy. While Gimnasia struggled to find the net, scoring only 13 goals in total during the 2010 Apertura tournament Stracqualursi scored freely for Tigre. His 11th and last goal of the Apertura came in the postponed game with Independiente that was played on 6 February 2011. His tally of 11 goals made him the joint top scorer along with Santiago Silva of Vélez Sársfield, making him the first Tigre player ever to become top scorer in the Argentine Primera División.

Straqualursi continued his good goalscoring form in the Clausura tournament with nine goals in the first ten games including a hat-trick against Boca Juniors at the Bombonera on 17 April 2011 meaning that he had scored the same number of goals as the whole Gimnasia team combined at that stage of the tournament.

=== Everton ===
In August 2011, Stracqualursi signed a season-long loan deal with Premier League club Everton and was given squad number 11. Stracqualursi made his first appearance as a substitute in a home game against Wigan. He assisted in the third goal of a 3–1 victory. Stracqualursi made his first full start for Everton in a 2–1 League Cup home victory against West Brom. He had to wait until 4 January 2012, to make his first league start as he played the full game in a 2–1 defeat to Bolton Wanderers. Stracqualursi scored his first goal for Everton against Fulham in a 2–1 victory in the 4th round of the FA Cup. In the next game Stracqualursi received a standing ovation from the Goodison Park crowd after his role in the 1–0 win over league leaders Manchester City. He scored his first Premier League goal in a 2–0 win against Chelsea at Goodison Park on 11 February. Stracqualursi continued his good run of scoring by netting his second goal in the FA Cup and third in five games against Blackpool in the fifth round. Despite only being at the club for one season, Stracqualursi became a cult hero amongst the Everton fans due to his hard work and commitment.

=== San Lorenzo ===
In July 2012, Stracqualursi moved on a free transfer from Tigre to fellow Argentine Primera División side San Lorenzo. His first goal was the winner in a 2–1 league victory over Colón in September. When the league began its two-month winter break in December, Stracqualursi had scored seven goals and made four assists in eighteen games to help San Lorenzo to 11th in the league. In April, Stracqualursi was sent off in the 38th minute of a league match against Godoy Cruz with the score at 0–0. The match went on to finish 1–1.

=== Emelec ===
In July 2013, Stracqualursi signed for Ecuadorian Serie A side Club Sport Emelec. He scored two goals on his debut in a league game against Barcelona Sporting Club.

=== Lanús ===
In July 2015, Stracqualursi signed for Argentine Primera División side Lanús.

After a spell playing in Italy's Serie D, Stracqualursi returned to Argentina to join Torneo Argentino A side Unión de Sunchales.

== Career statistics ==
As of match played 11 May 2014

Appearances and goals by club, season and competition
Club	Season	League			National cup		League cup		Continental		Total	
Club	Season	Division	Apps	Goals	Apps	Goals	Apps	Goals	Apps	Goals	Apps	Goals
Gimnasia La Plata	2008–09	Argentine Primera División	12	1	–		–		–		12	1
Gimnasia La Plata	2009–10	Argentine Primera División	34	5	–		–		–		34	5
Gimnasia La Plata	Total		46	6	–		–		–		46	6
Tigre	2010–11	Argentine Primera División	38	21	–		–		–		38	21
Everton (loan)	2011–12	Premier League	20	1	5	2	2	0	–		27	4
San Lorenzo	2012–13	Argentine Primera División	31	8	1	0	0	0	–		32	8
Emelec	2013	Ecuadorian Serie A	16	10	0	0	0	0	3	0	19	10
Emelec	2014	Ecuadorian Serie A	13	5	0	0	0	0	6	1	21	6
Emelec	Total		29	15	0	0	0	0	3	0	40	16
Career total			164	51	6	2	2	0	3	0	183	54

== Honours ==
Individual

- Primera División top scorer: 2010 Apertura (shared with Santiago Silva)
