= Santiago Silva (footballer, born 1980) =

Uruguayan footballer (born 1980)

Personal information
- Full name: Santiago Martín Silva Olivera
- Date of birth: 9 December 1980 (age 45)
- Place of birth: Montevideo, Uruguay
- Height: 1.83 m (6 ft 0 in)
- Position: Forward

Youth career
- Central Español

Senior career*
Years	Team	Apps	(Gls)
1998	Central Español	3	(1)
1999–2000	River Plate (Montevideo)	28	(15)
2001	Defensor Sporting	19	(9)
2002	Corinthians	5	(0)
2002	Nacional	7	(0)
2003	River Plate (Montevideo)	10	(0)
2003–2004	Energie Cottbus	32	(9)
2004–2005	Beira-Mar	30	(8)
2005	Newell's Old Boys	14	(4)
2006	Central Español	13	(3)
2006–2007	Gimnasia La Plata	35	(14)
2007–2011	Vélez Sarsfield	76	(34)
2009	→ Banfield (loan)	35	(22)
2011	Fiorentina	12	(1)
2012–2013	Boca Juniors	56	(20)
2013–2015	Lanús	54	(13)
2015	Arsenal de Sarandi	20	(7)
2016	Banfield	26	(11)
2017–2018	Universidad Católica	22	(3)
2018	Talleres	13	(4)
2018–2019	Gimnasia La Plata	21	(5)
2019–2020	Argentinos Juniors	21	(4)
2022–2023	Aldosivi	39	(3)
2023	El Palo	14	(2)
- * Club domestic league appearances and goals as of 12 March 2024

Santiago Martín Silva Olivera (born 9 December 1980) is a Uruguayan professional footballer who plays as a forward. His nickname is El Tanque (The Tank).

== Career ==
Silva started his career in Uruguay playing for Central Español, River Plate Montevideo and Defensor Sporting. He then had his first spell outside the country playing with Brazilian side SC Corinthians. However, after half a year he returned to Uruguay to play for Nacional (where he won the 2002 Uruguayan Primera División), and a second period with River Plate.

Subsequently, Silva had two European spells with German Energie Cottbus and Portuguese S.C. Beira-Mar. In 2005, he had his first spell in Argentina playing half a season for Newell's Old Boys. After half a year back in Uruguay with his first team, Central Español, Silva returned to Argentina to play for Gimnasia y Esgrima La Plata in 2006. Three years after his period at Gimnasia, the Uruguayan forward admitted to the press that the team lost on purpose a match against Boca Juniors, who were challenging the 2006 Apertura with Gimnasia's rivals Estudiantes de La Plata, after pressure from their own team's hooligans.

Silva joined Vélez Sarsfield in 2007, and was loaned to Banfield in 2009. He played 2 Short tournaments with Banfield scoring 22 goals in 35 games with the team. During the 2009 Apertura he scored 14 goals in 18 games, including two in the victory on the derby against Lanús. Silva helped Banfield obtain their first Argentine Primera División title of their history and finished as the tournament's top scorer in the process. During his time in Banfield, he played along fellow Uruguayan player Sebastián Fernández as his striking partner.

In January 2010, he returned from his loan to Vélez Sársfield. He made a strong striking partnership with Juan Manuel Martínez during the 2010 Apertura (in which Vélez was runner-up). Silva started the 19 games and scored 11 goals, while Martínez scored a further 10 in 19. The Uruguayan forward also finished the tournament as league top scorer, along Tigre's Denis Stracqualursi.

The following semester, Silva won his second Argentine league title (first with Vélez) playing 13 games and scoring 7 goals during the 2011 Clausura. However, he was not the team's top goalscorer, due to David Ramírez finishing the tournament one goal ahead. He also helped his team reach the semi-finals of the Copa Libertadores, playing 9 games and scoring 4 times.

Silva started the 2011–12 season with Vélez, playing two games and scoring once. However, on August 23, Fiorentina paid his contract's buyout clause of €1.73 million. Silva decided to join the Italian club citing personal reasons (he wanted a second chance in European football), despite there not being an economical difference between the contract offered by Fiorentina and the renewal offered by Vélez.

Later on in 2012, he played for the Argentine team Boca Juniors. He made his first goal against Estudiantes (LP) and in the Copa Libertadores 2012 he scored a goal against Unión Española scoring his first goal in the tournament with Boca Juniors. After Boca qualified to the Quarter Finals they played against Brazilian team Fluminense were Silva in the second game leading by the 90 minute, scored the 1-1 which made Boca Juniors qualify to the Semi Finals. He later scored against Universidad de Chile which qualified Boca Juniors to the Finals, where they lost 2–0 against Corinthians which became champions in Copa Libertadores 2012.

In 2015, Silva signed for Arsenal de Sarandí after a spell at Lanús, in which he played a key part in winning the Copa Sudamericana.

On 1 January 2016, Silva returned to Banfield.

== Honours ==
=== Club ===
Nacional

- Uruguayan Primera División (1): 2002

Banfield

- Argentine Primera División (1): 2009 Apertura

Vélez Sársfield

- Argentine Primera División (1): 2011 Clausura

Boca Juniors

- Copa Argentina (1): 2011–12 Copa Argentina

Lanús

- Copa Sudamericana (1): 2013

=== Individual ===
- Argentine Primera División top scorer (2): 2009 Apertura (with Banfield), 2010 Apertura (with Vélez Sársfield)
