= Ángel Cappa =

Argentine footballer and manager

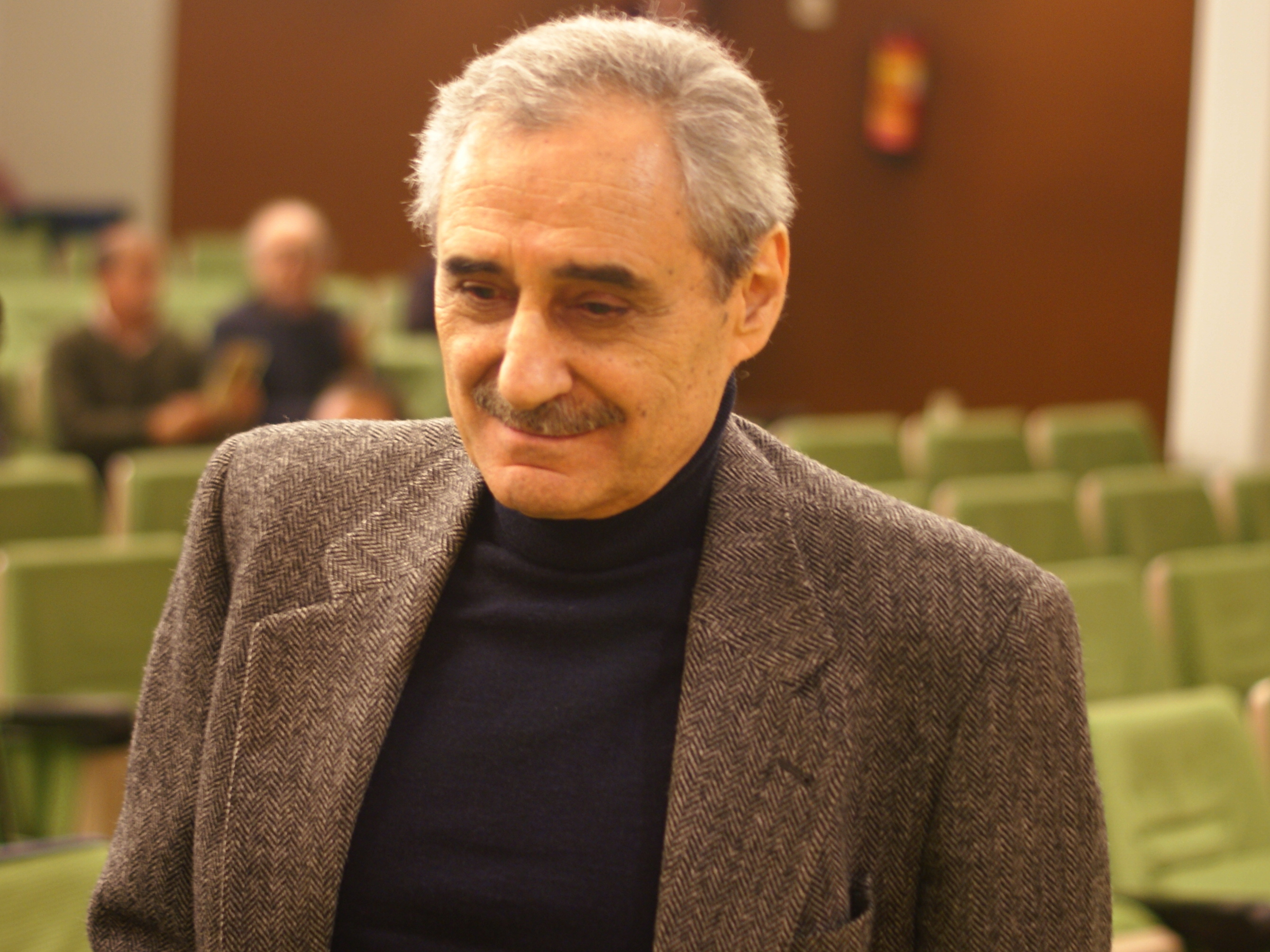

Personal information
- Full name: Ángel Alberto Cappa Polchi
- Date of birth: September 6, 1946 (age 80)
- Place of birth: Bahía Blanca, Argentina
- Height: 1.85 m (6 ft 1 in)
- Position: Midfielder

Senior career*
Years	Team	Apps	(Gls)
1965–1978	Olimpo		

Managerial career
- 1985–1986: Banfield
- 1987–1988: Banfield
- 1988–1988: Huracán
- 1996–1997: Las Palmas
- 1998: Racing Club
- 1999: Atlante
- 2000: Tenerife
- 2002: Universitario
- 2003: Racing Club
- 2003–2005: Mamelodi Sundowns
- 2008–2009: Huracán
- 2010: River Plate
- 2011: Gimnasia (La Plata)
- 2012: Universidad San Martín
- * Club domestic league appearances and goals

Ángel Alberto Cappa Polchi (born September 6, 1946) is an Argentine football manager and former player.

== Playing career ==
Cappa played for Olimpo and in Villa Mitre in the 1960s and 1970s, in Bahía Blanca. His career was undistinguished.

== Coaching career ==
Following his retirement as a player, Cappa took up coaching. He worked as assistant manager to César Luis Menotti in FC Barcelona (1983–1984), Peñarol (1990–1991) and Boca Juniors (1986–1987). His first stint as a manager was in Banfield in the Nacional B (Argentine second division) during the 1985–1986 season. Banfield was runner-up in the Nacional B. He returned to Banfield in the middle of the 1987–1988 season to manage the team now struggling in Primera A. Unfortunately, Banfield was relegated to second division. During the next season, 1988–1989, he managed Huracán, which was playing in the Nacional B. Huracán had a mediocre performance and Cappa left the team. He returned to work as an assistant for Menotti in 1990–1991 with Peñarol. Then, he worked as an assistant for Jorge Valdano with CD Tenerife (1992–1994) and Real Madrid (1994–1996), before returning to work as a head coach again.

As manager, Cappa worked for several clubs in different countries, including UD Las Palmas and CD Tenerife in Spain, Racing Club in Argentina, Atlante in Mexico, Universitario in Peru and Mamelodi Sundowns in South Africa.

In 2008, he became manager of Huracán, in the Argentine Primera División. His team was especially lauded for their offensive and short passing style of play during the 2009 Clausura tournament, competition where they took the second place, behind Vélez Sársfield. Following the 2009 Clausura six of the starting players left the club. The following season Huracán struggled near the bottom of the league and Cappa resigned in November after the 15th game.

On April 13, 2010, River Plate hired Cappa to replace Leonardo Astrada as coach. However, he was fired from the job on November 8, after his team had an unsuccessful run of 7 matches without winning during the 2010 Apertura. On December 18, 2010, agreed to become Gimnasia y Esgrima La Plata's manager for the 2011 Clausura. After winning two games in 12 matches, he was sacked as Gimnasia Manager on May 1, 2011, following a 2–1 home defeat by Newell's Old Boys in the Clausura championship.

In his career Ángel Cappa, coached two teams to championships. At Universitario, he won the 2002 Campeonato Apertura. At Mamelodi Sundowns, he won the one-day opening season event 2005 Charity Cup.

== Honours ==
Universitario

- Apertura 2002

Mamelodi Sundowns

- Charity Cup 2005
