= Luis Zubeldía =

Argentine footballer and coach

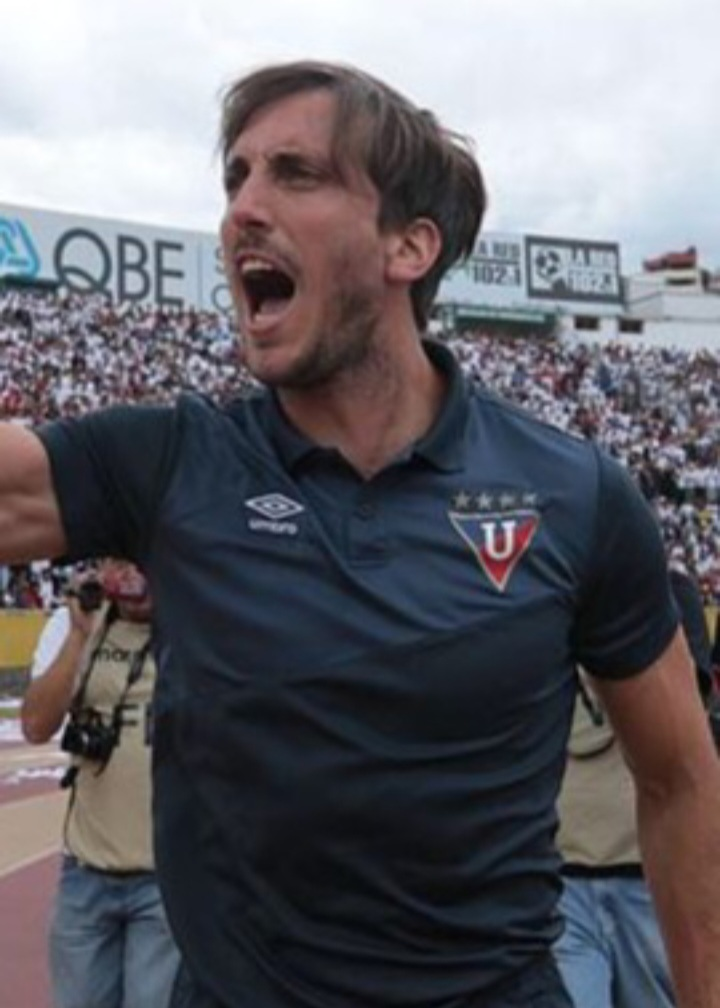
- Zubeldía in 2015

Personal information
- Full name: Luis Francisco Zubeldía
- Date of birth: 13 January 1981 (age 45)
- Place of birth: Santa Rosa, La Pampa, Argentina
- Height: 1.78 m (5 ft 10 in)
- Position: Midfielder

Youth career
- General Belgrano
- Lanús

Senior career*
Years	Team	Apps	(Gls)
1998–2004	Lanús	57	(3)

International career
1997	Argentina U17	12	(0)
1999–2001	Argentina U20	15	(0)

Managerial career
- 2005–2008: Lanús (assistant)
- 2008–2010: Lanús
- 2011–2012: Barcelona SC
- 2012–2013: Racing Club
- 2014–2015: LDU Quito
- 2016: Santos Laguna
- 2017: Independiente Medellín
- 2017: Alavés
- 2018: Cerro Porteño
- 2018–2021: Lanús
- 2022–2023: LDU Quito
- 2024–2025: São Paulo
- 2025–2026: Fluminense
- * Club domestic league appearances and goals

Luis Francisco Zubeldía (born 13 January 1981) is an Argentine football manager and former player.

A former midfielder, Zubeldía's career was mainly associated to Club Atlético Lanús, where he played as a senior and managed the club in two different spells. He was known for being the youngest person to be in charge of an Argentine first division team.

== Playing career ==
=== Club ===
Born in Santa Rosa, La Pampa, Zubeldía started playing with hometown side General Belgrano, before being spotted by José Pékerman and being taken on a trial period for the Argentine youth sides. After attracting the interest of several clubs, he chose to join Lanús, as according to himself, "his school was near the club".

Zubeldía made his first team debut for Lanús on 30 October 1998, in a 2–2 home draw against Independiente. He made 57 appearances, scoring 3 goals. In 2004, he retired from football at 23 years of age due to a osteochondritis dissecans of his knee.

=== International ===
Zubeldía represented Argentina at under-17 and under-20 levels. He played for the former in the 1997 FIFA U-17 World Championship, and the latter in the 1999 FIFA World Youth Championship and the 2001 South American U-20 Championship.

== Managing career ==
=== Lanús ===
After retiring, Zubeldía joined the staff of Ramón Cabrero at his main club Lanús, as an assistant. In June 2008, he was announced as manager of the club in the place of Cabrero; at the age of 27, making him the youngest coach in the history of the Argentine Primera División.

After leading the team to fourth place in the 2008 Apertura Tournament and qualifying to the 2009 Copa Libertadores, Lanús' Zubeldía ended the 2009 Clausura Tournament in third place. Under his technical leadership, Lanus finished the 2008–09 season with a total of 75 points, the best record in club's history so far.

On 15 November 2010, Zubeldía resigned and was replaced by Gabriel Schürrer.

=== Barcelona SC ===
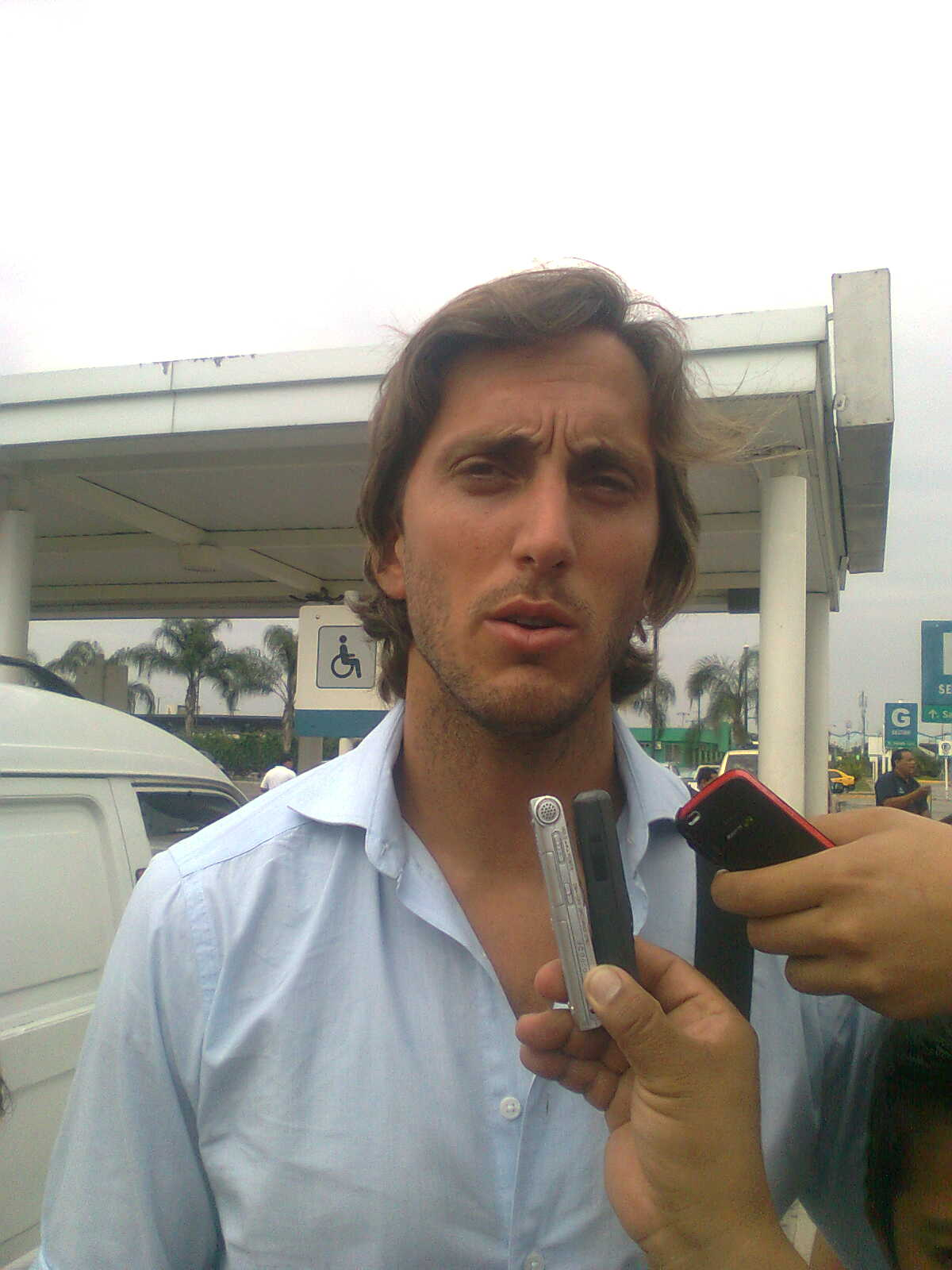
Zubeldía in 2012

On 24 June 2011, Zubeldía moved abroad and took over Ecuadorian club Barcelona SC, signing an 18-month contract. On 8 April 2012, after a 1–1 tie against LDU Quito, the president of Barcelona, Antonio Noboa, entered the dressing rooms, having a strong discussion with the young coach. Zubeldía then gave a press conference in the following day announcing his resignation from Barcelona, which stated:

"The president made a comment that I believe was disoriented, I did everything possible not to react, but I reacted as any person of character would have reacted. It did not escalate, but respect was broken. Leaving that to the side and not being ego-centric, I choose to step aside for the benefit of the institution, because if the coach and the trainer don't respect each other, there's no project that could work. I would have liked to be in the photo of the winner of the stage, I wish the best to the next trainer, who has the most important thing, the raw materials."

—

Zubeldía's replacement was his compatriot Gustavo Costas, which led Barcelona to the 2012 Serie A title after 15 years. Zubeldía was recognized for his role in putting together the team that won the championship.

=== Racing Club ===
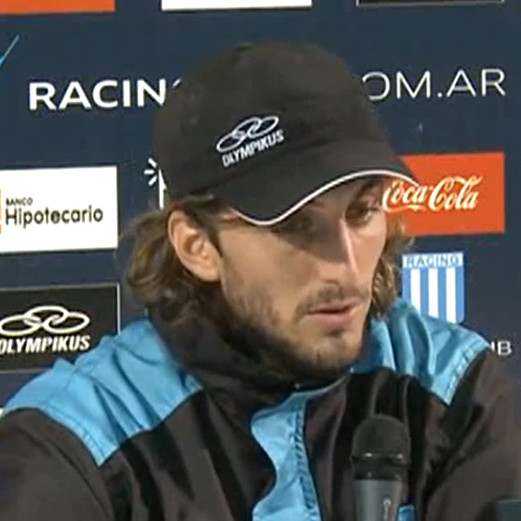
Zubeldía as manager of Racing Club in 2012

On 15 April 2012, Zubeldía returned to his home country after being appointed manager of Racing Club, replacing Alfio Basile. He led the club to the 2012 Copa Argentina Final, losing 2–1 to Boca Juniors.

Zubeldía provided the first team debuts of several youth players which would later establish themselves as regular starters, such as Ricardo Centurión, Rodrigo De Paul, Luis Fariña and Luciano Vietto. He led the club to a fifth place in the 2012 Torneo Inicial, and to a sixth position in the 2013 Torneo Final.

On 25 August 2013, Zubeldía was sacked from Racing, after a poor start of the 2013–14 campaign.

=== LDU Quito ===
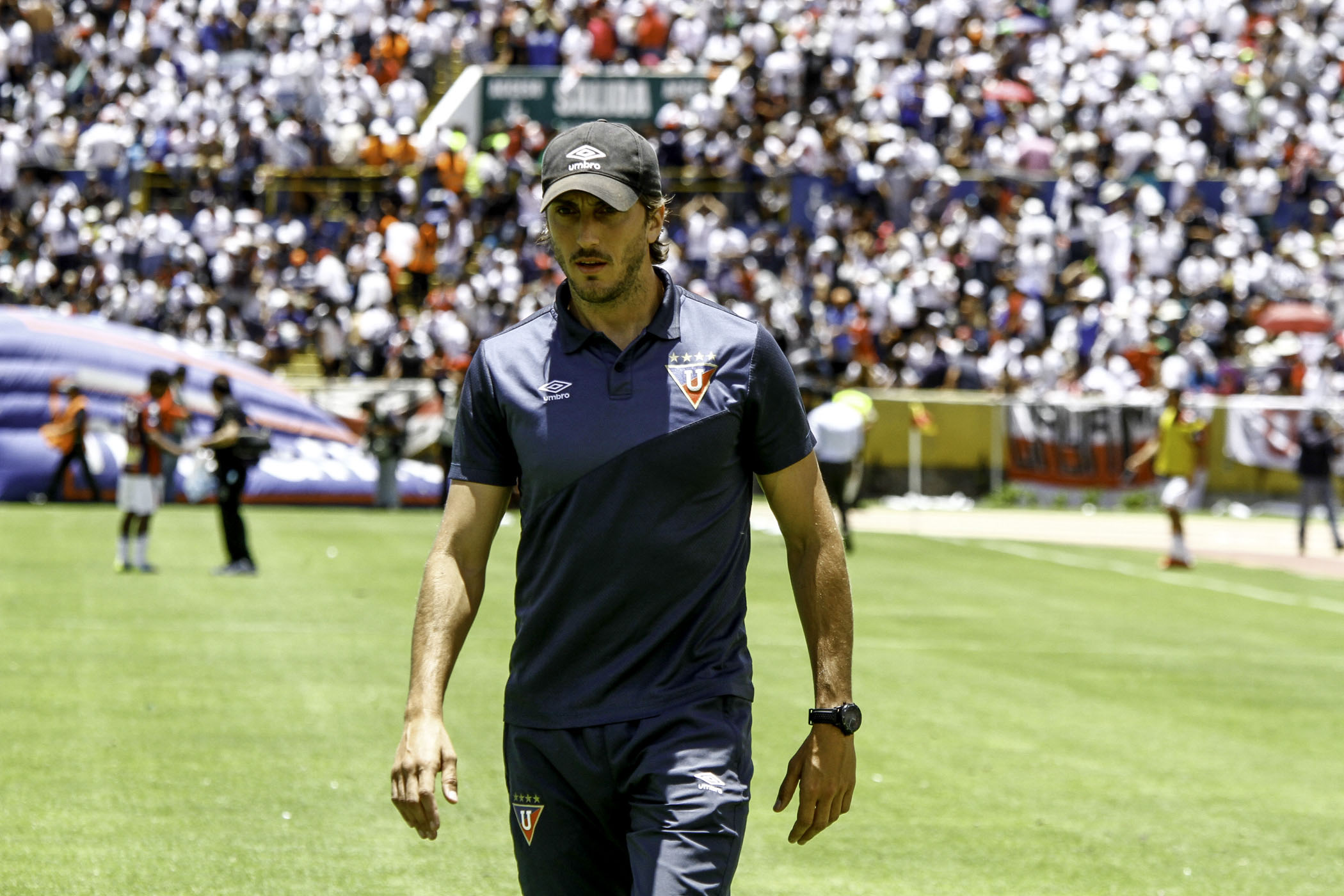
Zubeldía in charge of LDU Quito in 2015

On 26 November 2013, Zubeldía returned to Ecuador to replace Edgardo Bauza at the helm of LDU Quito. On 20 December 2014, he renewed his contract with the club for a further year.

In the 2015 season, Zubeldía led LDU to the first place in the First Stage, but left on 21 December of that year after losing the finals to Emelec.

=== Santos Laguna ===
On 28 November 2015, Zubeldía was announced at Liga MX side Santos Laguna as their manager for the 2016 Clausura tournament. He reached the 2016 CONCACAF Champions League semifinals with the club, being eliminated by Club América on extra time.

On 15 August 2016, after only two draws in the first five matches of the Apertura tournament, Zubeldía was dismissed.

=== Independiente Medellín ===
On 14 December 2016, Zubeldía switched teams and countries again, after taking over Independiente Medellín of the Categoría Primera A. The following 6 June, after the club's elimination in the 2017 Apertura quarterfinals, he resigned.

=== Alavés ===
On 16 June 2017, Zubeldía moved to Europe after being appointed manager of Deportivo Alavés of the Spanish La Liga, signing a one-year deal. He was relieved from his duties on 17 September, after losing the first four matches of the campaign.

=== Cerro Porteño ===
On 3 February 2018, Zebeldía replaced Leonel Álvarez at the helm of Paraguayan Primera División side Cerro Porteño. On 20 August, he was sacked and subsequently replaced by Fernando Jubero.

=== Return to Lanús ===
On 31 August 2018, Lanús president Nicolás Russo announced the return of Zubeldía as manager of the club, with the official announcement occurring on 3 September. He reached the 2020 Copa Sudamericana final with the club, but lost 3–0 to Defensa y Justicia.

On 2 December 2021, Zubeldía confirmed that he would leave Lanús at the end of the season.

=== Return to LDU Quito ===
On 22 April 2022, LDU confirmed the return of Zubeldía as manager of the club. He won his first professional title of his career on 28 October 2023, lifting the 2023 Copa Sudamericana after a 1–1 draw (4–3 penalty win) against Fortaleza.

On 17 December 2023, Zubeldía's side won the 2023 Serie A after another penalty win, now over Independiente del Valle. Despite the club's attempts for a contract renewal, LDU's president confirmed his departure on 4 January 2024.

=== São Paulo ===
On 20 April 2024, Zubeldía was announced as head coach of Campeonato Brasileiro Série A side São Paulo, signing a contract until December 2025. On 16 June of the following year, he left by mutual consent.

=== Fluminense ===
On 25 September 2025, Zubeldía was announced as head coach of Fluminense also in the Brazilian top tier, signing a contract until December 2026. On 13 August of the following year, after being knocked out of the 2026 Copa do Brasil, he was sacked.

== Personal life ==
Zubeldía's older brothers Gustavo and Juan are also involved in football: the former worked with him at Lanús as a fitness coach, later working under the same capacity at several clubs, and the latter was also a footballer and a midfielder, later becoming a manager.

== Career statistics ==
=== Club ===
Club	Country	Year	Part	Goals
Lanús	Argentina	1998–2004	57	3

=== Managerial ===
As of 11 August 2026

Managerial record by team and tenure
Team	Nat	From	To	Record							
Team	Nat	From	To	G	W	D	L	GF	GA	GD	Win %
Lanús	(Argentina)	15 June 2008	15 November 2010	105	48	27	30	145	128	+17	45.71
Barcelona SC	(Ecuador)	24 June 2011	10 April 2012	32	16	9	7	43	27	+16	50.00
Racing Club	(Argentina)	15 April 2012	25 August 2013	60	22	14	24	69	64	+5	36.67
LDU Quito	(Ecuador)	26 November 2013	21 December 2015	96	47	29	20	135	86	+49	48.96
Santos Laguna	(Mexico)	22 December 2015	15 August 2016	34	12	9	13	44	40	+4	35.29
Independiente Medellín	(Colombia)	14 December 2016	6 June 2017	28	17	3	8	47	36	+11	60.71
Alavés	(Spain)	16 June 2017	17 September 2017	4	0	0	4	0	7	−7	0.00
Cerro Porteño	(Paraguay)	5 February 2018	20 August 2018	36	25	8	3	69	36	+33	69.44
Lanús	(Argentina)	3 September 2018	12 December 2021	122	53	28	41	181	167	+14	43.44
LDU Quito	(Ecuador)	22 April 2022	10 January 2024	71	37	23	11	114	60	+54	52.11
São Paulo	(Brazil)	20 April 2024	16 June 2025	80	37	25	18	107	73	+34	46.25
Fluminense	(Brazil)	25 September 2025	13 August 2026	56	27	17	12	73	50	+23	48.21
Total				724	341	192	191	1,027	774	+253	47.10

== Honours ==
=== Manager ===
LDU Quito

- Copa Sudamericana: 2023
- Ecuadorian Serie A: 2023

Fluminense

- Taça Guanabara: 2026
