= Roberto Pompei =

Argentine footballer and manager

Tito Pompei
Personal information
- Full name: Roberto Fabián Pompei
- Date of birth: 14 March 1970 (age 56)
- Place of birth: Buenos Aires, Argentina
- Height: 1.78 m (5 ft 10 in)
- Position: Midfielder

Team information
- Current team: Boca Juniors (youth coach)

Senior career*
Years	Team	Apps	(Gls)
1991–1995	Vélez Sársfield	56	(6)
1992–1993	→ Talleres (RE) (loan)	42	(4)
1995–1996	Racing Club	35	(3)
1996–1997	Boca Juniors	30	(3)
1997–2000	Real Oviedo	96	(16)
2000–2003	Estudiantes	98	(8)
2003–2004	Chacarita Juniors	23	(0)
2004	Arsenal de Sarandí	14	(0)
2005	Huracán	11	(0)
2007–2008	Centenario	2	(1)

Managerial career
- 2009–2011: Boca Juniors (youth)
- 2010: Boca Juniors (interim)
- 2011: Huracán
- 2013–2014: Oriente Petrolero
- 2015: Deportivo Municipal
- 2015: Oriente Petrolero
- 2020–: Boca Juniors (youth)
- * Club domestic league appearances and goals

Roberto Fabián Pompei (born 14 March 1970 in Buenos Aires) is an Argentine former footballer and is currently the manager of Oriente Petrolero. Pompei previously worked as Boca Juniors' youth manager and also as their interim manager on two occasions in 2010. He also managed Peruvian club Deportivo Municipal in 2015.
