= David Ramírez (footballer, born 1981) =

Argentine footballer

Personal information
- Full name: Arturo David Ramírez Torres
- Date of birth: 18 February 1981 (age 45)
- Place of birth: Ramallo, Buenos Aires, Argentina
- Height: 1.79 m (5 ft 10 in)
- Position: Attacking midfielder

Youth career
- Defensores de Belgrano VR

Senior career*
Years	Team	Apps	(Gls)
2001–2003	Sportivo Italiano	60	(24)
2003–2005	Ferro Carril Oeste	53	(10)
2005–2006	Olimpo	30	(4)
2007	Ponferradina	9	(2)
2007–2008	Godoy Cruz	29	(8)
2008	Gimnasia de Jujuy	9	(0)
2009	Unión Española	30	(4)
2010	Godoy Cruz	32	(10)
2011–2013	Vélez Sársfield	36	(11)
2012–2013	→ Godoy Cruz (loan)	24	(5)
2013–2014	Millonarios	6	(0)
2014–2015	Colón	19	(4)
2016	Godoy Cruz	10	(0)
2016–2017	Defensores de Belgrano VR	12	(1)
Total		359	(83)

Managerial career
- 2017: Estudiantes SL (assistant)
- 2020–2021: Los Andes VR (youth)
- 2021: Los Andes VR
- 2022–2023: Gutiérrez
- 2024: Círculo Deportivo
- * Club domestic league appearances and goals

Arturo David Ramírez Torres (born 18 February 1981) is an Argentine former football midfielder.

== Career ==
Ramírez started his professional career in 2001 with Defensores de Belgrano de Villa Ramallo. Subsequently, he joined Sportivo Italiano, where he played for 3 years. In the second semester of 2003, he was transferred to Ferro Carril Oeste. Two years later, Ramírez was signed by Olimpo, therefore having his first experience in the Argentine top division.

The midfielder had his first experience outside his country playing for Spanish SD Ponferradina on a six-months loan during 2007. He returned to his country later that year to join Godoy Cruz, in the second division.

In 2008, Ramírez was signed by Gimnasia y Esgrima de Jujuy, where he played 9 games without scoring during the 2008 Apertura. In January of that year, Ramírez moved to Chile to play for Unión Española. During the 2009 Apertura, he played 17 matches (3 goals), and finished runner-up of the Chilean Primera División with the team. In the second half of 2009, he played with Unión Española the Copa Sudamericana, totaling 4 matches and 1 goal (against Vélez Sársfield).

In January 2010, Ramírez returned to Argentina signing again with Godoy Cruz, this time in the first division. He played a total 32 games (10 goals) during his year-long spell with the Mendoza Province team, and helped them finish 3rd in the 2010 Clausura and 5th in the 2010 Apertura.

On 27 January 2011, he agreed to join Vélez Sársfield, that bought his transfer rights from Godoy Cruz in approximately US$3 million. On 15 February 2011 he made his Copa Libertadores debut at the age of 29 and scored his first goal for Vélez in a 3–0 win against Caracas FC. On his first season with Vélez, he helped his team to win the 2011 Clausura tournament and reach the semi-finals of the Copa Libertadores. Despite not being a regular starter, he was the team's top scorer during the league championship, with 8 goals in 14 games.

== Coaching career ==
Following his retirement, Ramírez served as assistant coach of Omar Asad in Estudiantes de San Luis. As head coach, he led amateur clubs, Los Andes de Villa Ramallo in 2021, Gutiérrez in 2022–23 and Círculo Deportivo in 2024.

== Other works ==
In 2025, Ramírez became a football agent.

== Honours ==
Vélez Sársfield

- Argentine Primera División (1): 2011 Clausura
