= Valentín Viola =

Argentine footballer

Personal information
- Full name: Valentín Nicolás Viola
- Date of birth: August 28, 1991 (age 35)
- Place of birth: Moreno, Argentina
- Height: 1.80 m (5 ft 11 in)
- Positions: Forward; winger

Youth career
- –2010: Racing Club

Senior career*
Years	Team	Apps	(Gls)
2009–2012	Racing Club	46	(6)
2012–2016	Sporting	18	(1)
2013–2016	Sporting B	8	(2)
2013–2014	→ Racing Club (loan)	30	(1)
2014–2015	→ Karabükspor (loan)	21	(3)
2016–2019	Apollon Limassol	0	(0)
2016	→ Mouscron (loan)	23	(2)
2017	→ Independiente Medellín	19	(4)
2018	→ San Lorenzo (loan)	1	(0)
2019	San Martín Tucumán	4	(0)
2019–2020	Nueva Chicago	14	(2)
2020–2021	Agropecuario	6	(0)
2021–2022	Barracas Central	9	(0)
- * Club domestic league appearances and goals as of 20:07, 24 March 2022 (UTC)

Valentín Nicolás Viola (born 28 August 1991) is an Argentine football player.

== Career ==
=== Racing Club ===
Valentín came through the Racing Club youth development system, and made his debut for Racing's first team in a friendly match against El Porvenir in January 2010. His first official match occurred on 3 September 2010 during Apertura 2010, in a match against Colón; he scored his first official goal on 7 May 2011 in the 2–1 win against Arsenal de Sarandí, when he came on as a substitute in the 80th minute, replacing Gabriel Hauche, and scored one minute later. Valentín had already scored for Racing first team, when he scored a header against Godoy Cruz at Copa Ciudad de Mendonza on 27 January 2011.

=== Sporting ===
On late July 2012, despite interest from other clubs, such as Parma, Atlético Madrid and Benfica, he was transferred to Sporting.
