= Mauro Conochiari =

Argentine-Italian footballer

Mauro Conocchiari
Personal information
- Full name: Mauro Conocchiari
- Date of birth: August 29, 1980 (age 46)
- Place of birth: casilda
- Height: 1.72 m (5 ft 8 in)
- Position: Striker

Team information
- Current team: Retired

Senior career*
| Years | Team | Apps | (Gls) |
| 2002–2003 | Newell's Old Boys | 4 | (0) |
| 2003–2004 | Grottammare | 16 | (5) |
| 2004–2006 | Central Córdoba | 36 | (18) |
| 2006–2007 | Deportivo Morón | 18 | (8) |
| 2007–2008 | UD Vecindario | 19 | (10) |
| 2008 | Deportivo Italia | 11 | (6) |
| 2009–2010 | Defensores de Belgrano | 28 | (13) |
| 2010–2011 | Deportivo Morón | 18 | (9) |
| 2011– | Sportivo Belgrano | 29 | (12) |
| 2012-2013 | Tiro Federal R | 19 | (8) |
| 2013-2016 | Sarmiento (Leones) | 67 | (20) |
- * Club domestic league appearances and goals as of January 1, 2016

Mauro Conochiari (born 29 August 1980 in Argentina) was an Argentine-Italian footballer who played for Defensores de Belgrano in Argentina's third division.
