= Leandro Somoza =

Argentine footballer

Personal information
- Full name: Leandro Daniel Somoza
- Date of birth: 26 January 1981 (age 45)
- Place of birth: Buenos Aires, Argentina
- Height: 1.85 m (6 ft 1 in)
- Position: Defensive midfielder

Youth career
- Vélez Sársfield

Senior career*
| Years | Team | Apps | (Gls) |
| 2001–2006 | Vélez Sarsfield | 124 | (6) |
| 2006–2008 | Villarreal | 25 | (0) |
| 2007–2008 | → Betis (loan) | 15 | (0) |
| 2008–2010 | Vélez Sarsfield | 53 | (4) |
| 2011–2013 | Boca Juniors | 66 | (0) |
| 2013–2014 | Lanús | 45 | (1) |
| 2015–2017 | Vélez Sarsfield | 39 | (0) |
| 2017–2018 | Aldosivi | 21 | (0) |

International career
| 2006–2013 | Argentina | 4 | (0) |

Managerial career
- 2019: Cerro Porteño (assistant)
- 2020–2021: Boca Juniors (assistant)
- 2021: Al Nassr (assistant)
- 2022: Rosario Central
- 2022: Aldosivi
- * Club domestic league appearances and goals

Leandro Daniel Somoza (born 26 January 1981) is an Argentine football coach and former player who played as a defensive midfielder.

== Club career ==
Somoza began his professional career playing for Vélez Sársfield in the Argentine Primera in 2001. He played for the club for five years, and was a key player in the 2005 Clausura tournament winning team.

In 2006, Somoza was transferred to La Liga club Villarreal CF on a five-year contract. He joined fellow countrymen Juan Román Riquelme, Gonzalo Rodríguez, Rodolfo Arruabarrena, Fabricio Fuentes and Mariano Barbosa. However, Somoza spent only one season with Villarreal, being loaned in August 2007 to Real Betis. The Argentine midfielder was presented to the media on 14 August and made his first appearance in a friendly against Real Zaragoza two days later. His first competitive debut came in the season against Recreativo Huelva, on 26 August.

After his second season in Spain, Somoza returned to Argentina for the 2008–09 season to play again for Vélez Sársfield. During the 2009 Clausura, he was part of the squad that won the Argentine league championship, but did not participate in any of the games due to an injury he had suffered at the end of the previous tournament.

Somoza scored for the first time after his injury on a 1–1 draw with Lanús, on the 9th fixture of the 2009 Apertura.

On 14 January 2011, Somoza signed on to play with Boca Juniors. With the xeneizes Somoza won the 2011 Apertura and 2012 Copa Argentina and was runner-up of the 2012 Copa Libertadores.

For the 2013–14 Argentine Primera División season Somoza joined Lanús. With his new club the midfielder won the 2013 Copa Sudamericana, playing all 10 games.

In 2015, Somoza agreed on a free transfer to Vélez Sarsfield, his third spell with the club.

== International career ==
Somoza debuted for Argentina by then new manager Alfio Basile in the friendly international against Brazil at the Emirates Stadium in London, England during 2006. Two years later, while playing for Vélez, he was called again by Basile for the match against Chile, although he remained on the bench.

After four years, the midfielder rejoined the national team upon Alejandro Sabella's call up to play the Superclásico de las Américas. Sabella also called Somoza for the FIFA World Cup qualifying games against Peru and Uruguay in 2013.

== Managerial career ==
After working as Miguel Ángel Russo's assistant at Cerro Porteño, Boca Juniors and Al Nassr, Somoza was appointed manager of Rosario Central on 27 March 2022. He resigned on 14 June, and was appointed manager of Aldosivi ten days later.

== Honours ==
Vélez Sársfield

- Argentine Primera División: 2005 Clausura, 2009 Clausura

Boca Juniors

- Argentine Primera División: 2011 Apertura
- Copa Argentina: 2011–12

Lanús

- Copa Sudamericana: 2013
