= Racing de Trelew =

Argentine sports club

Racing Club Trelew
- Full name: Asociación Civil Racing Club Trelew
- Nickname(s): Academia
- Founded: October 27, 1920
- Ground: Estadio Cayetano Castro, Trelew, Chubut Province, Argentina
- Capacity: 6,000
- Chairman: Jorge Iriarte
- League: Torneo Argentino B
- 2010–11: Promoted from Torneo Argentino C
Home colours	Away colours

Asociación Civil Racing Club Trelew (mostly known as Racing de Trelew) is an Argentine sports club, located in the city of Trelew, Chubut Province. The club is mostly known for its football team, which currently plays in the Torneo Argentino B, the regionalised 4th division of the Argentine football league system.

== Titles ==
- League of Chubut: 11

1942, 1943, 1944, 1946, 1990, 1994 Apertura, 1994 Clausura, 1997 Apertura, 1997 Clausura, 1998 Apertura, 2000 Apertura

== See also ==
- List of football clubs in Argentina
- Argentine football league system
