= Atlético Policial =

Argentine football club

Club Atlético Policial
- Full name: Club Atlético Policial
- Nicknames: Poli, El Xeneize de la Tablada
- Founded: 31 March 1945; 80 years ago
- Ground: Estadio Liga Catamarqueña, San Fernando del Valle de Catamarca, Argentina
- Capacity: 6,500
- Chairman: Luis Agüero
- League: Torneo Argentino B
- 2011–12: 3rd. of Zona G
- Website: https://web.archive.org/web/20090425030920/http://www.clubpolicial.com.ar/
Home colours	Away colours

Club Atlético Policial is an Argentine football club, located in San Fernando del Valle de Catamarca. The team currently plays in the Torneo Argentino B, the regionalised 4th division of Argentine football league system.
