= La Plata derby =

Association football rivalry

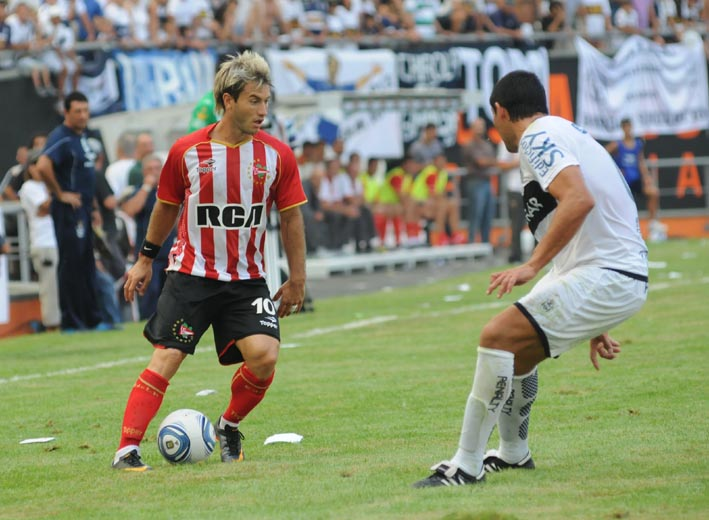
- Estudiantes striker Gastón Fernández carrying the ball followed by Ariel Agüero, 5 May 2011

- Estudiantes
- Sport: Association football
- Location: La Plata
- First meeting: 27 August 1916; Estudiantes 0–1 Gimnasia
- Latest meeting: 15 August 2026; Estudiantes 4–0 Gimnasia
- Stadiums: Jorge Hirschi (Estudiantes); Juan C. Zerillo (Gimnasia)

Statistics
- Total meetings: 186
- Most wins: Estudiantes (66)
- Top scorer: Manuel Pellegrina (11)
- Largest victory: Estudiantes 7–0 Gimnasia (15 Oct 2006)

La Plata derby (Clásico Platense or Clásico de La Plata in Spanish) is one of the most fiercely contested derbies in Argentine football. It is played between local clubs Estudiantes de La Plata and Gimnasia y Esgrima de la Plata.

The first official derby took place as part of the 1916 Argentine Primera División championship on August 27, 1916. On that occasion, Gimnasia won 1–0 over Estudiantes, with an owngoal by Ludovico Pastor.

The largest victory in a derby was on October 15, 2006, when Estudiantes thrashed Gimnasia by 7-0 in the 11th fixture of the 2006–07 season.

According to several studies related to social research in football, La Plata is one of the few cities in the country where the local clubs surpass Boca Juniors and River Plate in number of supporters. The other cities are Rosario, Santa Fe, Córdoba, Rafaela and San Miguel de Tucumán.

== History ==
Since their first meeting, both clubs have played 180 matches, including not only Primera División games but domestic cups and international tournaments such as Copa Sudamericana.

Estudiantes won 66 times (260 goals), while Gimnasia y Esgrima achieved 50 wins (213 goals), with 64 draws. Since the 2006 Clausura, the La Plata derby was held in Estadio Ciudad de La Plata, where Estudiantes remained unbeaten after 15 matches played, with 10 wins and 5 draws. The first match at Estadio Unico was played on February 12, 2006.

== Statistics ==
Updated as of 28 Nov, 2020.

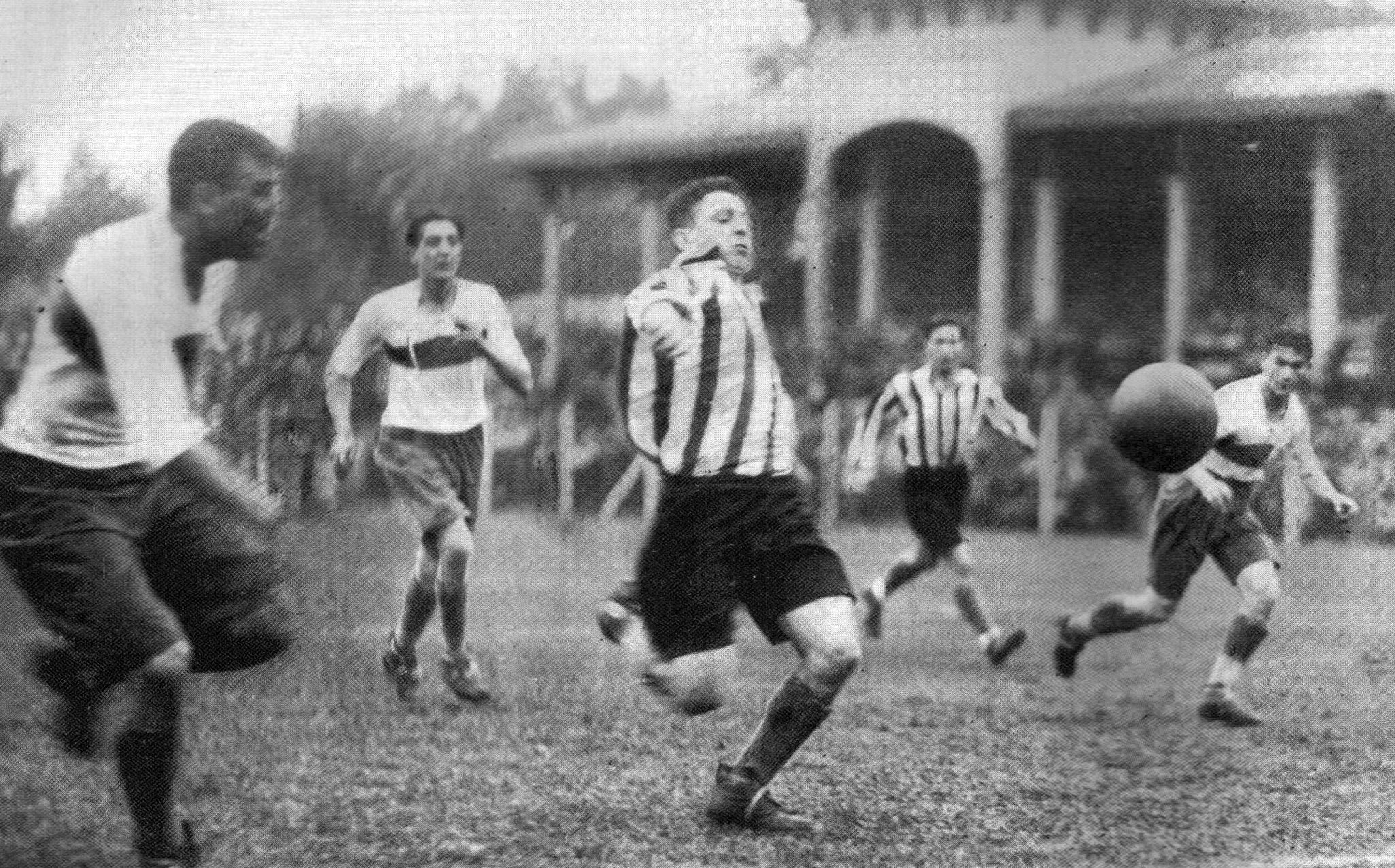
Scene of a "Clásico Platense" of 1931. That year, football became professional in Argentina

Competition	Match.	Gim. wins	Draw	Est. wins	Gim. goals	Est. goals
Primera División	171	47	60	64	204	251
Copa Competencia	2	1²	1	0	2	2
Copa Beccar Varela	1	1	0	0	2	1
Copa Británica	2	0	1	1	4	5
Copa Centenario AFA	2	1	1	0	1	0
Copa Sudamericana	2	0	1	1	0	1
Total	180	50	64	66	213	260

Data amateurism and other national tournaments scheduled from RSSSF. ¹²³ Gimnasia was awarded the victory by the abandonment of the players of Estudiantes.

== Players to have played for both clubs ==
- Héctor Antonio
- Carlos Bertero
- Antonio García Ameijenda
- Gerardo González
- Ricardo Infante
- Daniel Pighín
- Gastón Sessa
- Héctor Vargas
- Enrique Vidallé

== Highlights ==
=== Estudiantes ===
- On July 1, 1917 Estudiates won the derby match for the first time by a score of 3-0.
- On September 13, 1930 Estudiantes won the last amateur game between the clubs by a score of 4-1.
- On March 13, 1932 Estudiantes won 6-1 to record their biggest win in the derby, a record that stood for 74 years.
- On November 17, 1940 Estudiantes recorded a 4-1 away win.
- On September 5, 1948 Estudiantes equalled their record win, beating Gimnasia 6-1.
- On August 5, 1967 Estudiantes won 3-0 to end a run of three consecutive 0-0 draws in league fixtures between the clubs.
- On June 7, 1968 Estudiantes won 6-1 away to record the biggest ever away win in the derby.
- On November 27, 1971 Estudiantes won 5-1.
- On October 15, 2006 Estudiantes inflicted the heaviest derby defeat in the history of the fixture, winning 7-0.
- On December 13, 2006 Estudiantes beat Boca Juniors in a championship playoff game, winning the title despite the efforts of some Gimnasia fans who had threatened their own team into losing against Boca, in order to damage Estudiantes chances of winning the title.
- Estudiantes won five consecutive league derbies starting 15 October 2006. As of the beginning of the 2009 Clausura championship, this streak is still ongoing.
- On 8 Dec, 2025 Estudiantes won 0-1 as away team in the 2025 Torneo Clausura Semi-finals.

=== Gimnasia y Esgrima ===
- On August 27, 1916 Gimnasia won the first ever La Plata derby
- On June 25, 1963 Gimnasia won 5-2 at home.
- On November 11, 1970 Gimnasia won 4-1 in the Nacional avenging a 4-1 defeat earlier in the season.
- In 1993 Gimnasia beat Estudiantes 1-0 on aggregate on their way to winning the Copa Centenario.
- On April 24, 2003 Gimnasia won 2-4 as away team.
- On March 9, 2023 Gimnasia won the derby 2-1 after 13 years.
