= Luis Fariña =

Argentine footballer (born 1991)

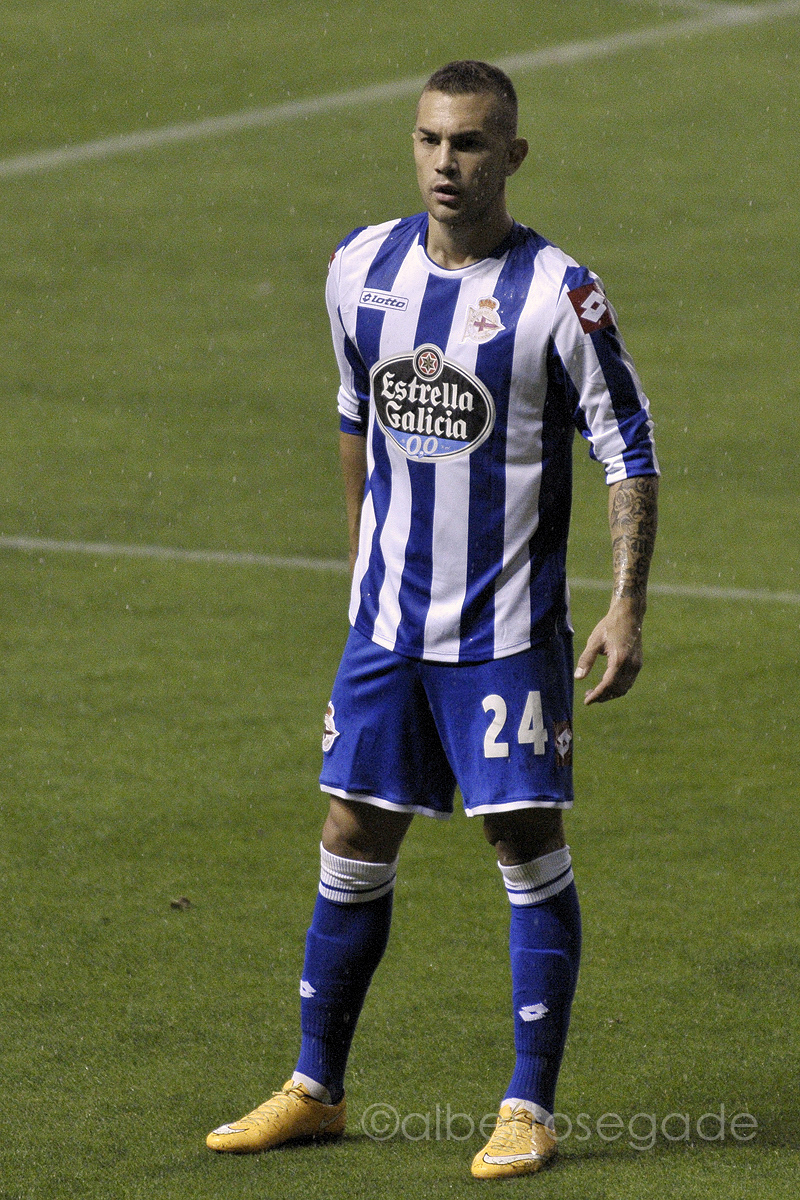
- Fariña playing for Deportivo La Coruña

Personal information
- Full name: Luis Carlos Fariña Olivera
- Date of birth: 20 April 1991 (age 35)
- Place of birth: Buenos Aires, Argentina
- Height: 1.76 m (5 ft 9 in)
- Position: Attacking midfielder

Youth career
- 2000–2010: Racing Club

Senior career*
Years	Team	Apps	(Gls)
2009–2013	Racing Club	51	(4)
2013–2017	Benfica	0	(0)
2013–2014	→ Baniyas (loan)	23	(6)
2014–2015	→ Deportivo La Coruña (loan)	21	(1)
2015	→ Rayo Vallecano (loan)	3	(0)
2016	→ Universidad de Chile (loan)	9	(0)
2016–2017	→ Asteras Tripolis (loan)	24	(1)
2017–2019	Aves	34	(3)
2019–2022	Cerro Porteño	17	(2)
2022–2023	Guaraní	39	(2)
- * Club domestic league appearances and goals as of 1 October 2023

Luis Carlos Fariña Olivera (born 20 April 1991) is an Argentine professional footballer who plays as an attacking midfielder.

== Career ==
Born in Buenos Aires, Fariña graduated from Racing Club de Avellaneda's youth system. He made his professional debut on 28 August 2009, replacing Sebastián Grazzini in a 1–1 home draw against Club Atlético Colón for the Argentine Primera División championship. Fariña appeared sparingly in the following campaigns, mainly used as a backup. He was only utilized regularly in the 2012–13 campaign, after profiting from both Giovanni Moreno and Lucas Castro's departures.

Fariña scored his first professional goals on 19 November 2012, netting a brace in a 4–0 home win against Quilmes Atlético Club. He finished the season with 28 matches and four goals, attracting the interest of S.L. Benfica, S.C. Braga and Sporting CP.

On 24 July 2013 Fariña signed for Benfica on a five-year deal for €3.5 million, joining fellow Racing teammates José Shaffer and José Luis Fernández. On 9 August, however, he was loaned to UAE Arabian Gulf League side Baniyas SC, in a season-long deal. On 27 July 2014, Fariña moved to Deportivo de La Coruña also in a temporary deal. He made his La Liga debut on 23 August, starting in a 1–2 away loss against Granada CF. Fariña scored his first goal in the main category of Spanish football on 15 December, netting the winner in a home success over Elche CF.

In August 2015, he joined Rayo Vallecano on loan for one season, until it was terminated early in January 2016, with the Argentine moving to Universidad de Chile until June. On 7 August 2016, Fariña moved to Greek Super League Greece club Asteras Tripolis in another temporary deal. A year later, the 26-year-old Fariña rescinded his contract with Benfica, without ever representing them, and signed a three-year contract with Aves.

== Personal life ==
Fariña's parents were born in Paraguay, with himself also holding a Paraguayan citizenship since December 2014.

== Honours ==
Racing Club

- Copa Argentina runner-up: 2011–12

Aves

- Taça de Portugal: 2017–18
