= 2011–12 Argentine Primera División season =

121st season of top-tier football league in Argentina

Primera División
- Season: 2011–12
- Champions: Apertura: Boca Juniors (30th title); Clausura: Arsenal (1st title)
- Relegated: Banfield; Olimpo
- 2012 Copa Libertadores: Boca Juniors; Lanús; Godoy Cruz
- 2012 Copa Sudamericana: Independiente; Racing; Tigre; Argentinos Juniors; Colón
- 2013 Copa Libertadores: Arsenal
- Matches: 380
- Goals: 813 (2.14 per match)
- Top goalscorer: Apertura: Rubén Ramírez (12 goals); Clausura: Carlos Luna (12 goals)
- Biggest home win: Godoy Cruz 6–1 All Boys (September 10, 2011)
- Biggest away win: Argentinos Juniors 0–4 Lanús (September 12, 2011); Banfield 0–4 Vélez Sársfield (February 17, 2012)
- Highest scoring: Boca Juniors 4–5 Independiente (March 11, 2012)
- Longest winning run: Boca Juniors – 4 matches (September 4–September 22)
- Longest unbeaten run: Boca Juniors – 23 matches (August 5, 2011–March 4, 2012)
- Longest losing run: Banfield – 6 matches (August 5–September 10)

The 2011–12 Primera División season is the 121st season of top-flight professional football in Argentina. A total of 20 teams will compete in the league. It started on August 5, 2011, and ended on July 1, 2012.

== Club information ==
Locations of the 2011–12 Primera División teams outside Greater Buenos Aires.
Locations of the 2011–12 Primera División teams within Greater Buenos Aires.

Club	City	Stadium	Capacity
All Boys	Buenos Aires	Islas Malvinas	21,000
Argentinos Juniors	Buenos Aires	Diego Armando Maradona	24,800
Arsenal	Sarandí	Julio H. Grondona	16,300
Atlético de Rafaela	Rafaela	Nuevo Monumental	16,000
Banfield	Banfield	Florencio Solá	40,500
Belgrano	Córdoba	Mario Alberto Kempes	57,000
Boca Juniors	Buenos Aires	Alberto J. Armando	49,000
Colón	Santa Fe	Brigadier General Estanislao López	32,500
Estudiantes (LP)	La Plata	Estadio Ciudad de La Plata	53,000
Godoy Cruz	Godoy Cruz	Malvinas Argentinas	40,268
Independiente	Avellaneda	Libertadores de América	32,500
Lanús	Lanús	Ciudad de Lanús – Néstor Díaz Pérez	46,619
Newell's Old Boys	Rosario	Marcelo Bielsa	38,095
Olimpo	Bahía Blanca	Roberto Natalio Carminatti	18,000
Racing	Avellaneda	Presidente Juan Domingo Perón	51,389
San Lorenzo	Buenos Aires	Pedro Bidegain	43,494
San Martín (SJ)	San Juan	Ingeniero Hilario Sánchez	25,286
Tigre	Victoria	Monumental de Victoria	26,282
Unión	Santa Fe	15 de Abril	22,852
Vélez Sársfield	Buenos Aires	José Amalfitani	49,540

=== Personnel and kits ===
Club	Manager	Kit manufacturer	Main sponsor
All Boys	(Argentina) José Romero	Signia	Lácteos Barraza
Argentinos Juniors	(Argentina) Leonardo Astrada	Olympikus	Liderar Seguros
Arsenal	(Argentina) Gustavo Alfaro	Lotto	La Nueva Seguros
Atlético de Rafaela	(Argentina) Rubén Forestello	Reusch	SanCor
Banfield	(Uruguay) Eduardo Acevedo	Mitre	Bingo Lomas
Belgrano	(Argentina) Ricardo Zielinski	Lotto	Tersuave
Boca Juniors	(Argentina) Julio César Falcioni	Nike	LG/BBVA Banco Francés
Colón	(Argentina) Roberto Sensini	Umbro	Flecha Bus
Estudiantes (LP)	(Argentina) Martín Zuccarelli (interim)	Adidas	DirecTV
Godoy Cruz	(Argentina) Nery Pumpido	Lotto	Mendoza
Independiente	(Argentina) Cristian Díaz	Puma	Motomel
Lanús	(Argentina) Gabriel Schürrer	Olympikus	Herbalife
Newell's Old Boys	(Argentina) Gerardo Martino	Topper	Motomel
Olimpo	(Argentina) Walter Perazzo	Balonpie	Bingo Bahía
Racing	(Argentina) Luis Zubeldía	Olympikus	Banco Hipotecario
San Lorenzo	(Argentina) Ricardo Caruso Lombardi	Lotto	La Nueva Seguros
San Martín (SJ)	(Argentina) Facundo Sava	Mitre	San Juan
Tigre	(Argentina) Rodolfo Arruabarrena	Kappa	Banco Macro
Unión	(Argentina) Frank Darío Kudelka	TBS	Flecha Bus
Vélez Sársfield	(Argentina) Ricardo Gareca	Topper	Mondial/Samsung

=== Managerial changes ===
Team	Outgoing manager	Manner of departure	Date of vacancy	Replaced by	Date of appointment	Position in table
Pre-season changes
Racing	Miguel Ángel Russo	End of contract	June 19, 2011	Diego Simeone	June 21, 2011	N/A
Estudiantes (LP)	Luis Suárez & Guillermo Trama (Note: Interim manager.)	Replaced	June 21, 2011	Miguel Ángel Russo	June 21, 2011	N/A
Apertura changes
Banfield	Sebastián Méndez	Resigned	August 27, 2011	Ricardo La Volpe	August 28, 2011	20th
Independiente	Antonio Mohamed	Resigned	September 5, 2011	Ramón Díaz	September 12, 2011	17th
Argentinos Juniors	Pedro Troglio	Resigned	September 18, 2011	Néstor Gorosito	September 20, 2011	19th
Newell's Old Boys	Javier Torrente	Resigned	September 27, 2011	Diego Cagna	September 29, 2011	16th
Estudiantes (LP)	Miguel Ángel Russo	Resigned	November 7, 2011	Juan Manuel Azconzábal (Note: Interim manager, but later promoted to full-time manager.)	November 9, 2011	19th
San Lorenzo	Omar Asad	Resigned	November 21, 2011	Leonardo Madelón	November 22, 2011	15th
Olimpo	Omar De Felippe (Note: Interim manager, but later replaced by Mauro Laspada as the interim manager.)	Resigned	November 21, 2011	Héctor Rivoira	December 2, 2011	17th
Inter-tournament changes
Banfield	Ricardo La Volpe	Sacked	December 14, 2011	Jorge da Silva	December 23, 2011	N/A
Godoy Cruz	Jorge da Silva	Resigned	December 14, 2011	Nery Pumpido	December 23, 2011	N/A
Newell's Old Boys	Diego Cagna	Sacked	December 19, 2011	Gerardo Martino	December 26, 2011	N/A
Racing	Diego Simeone	Resigned	December 19, 2011	Alfio Basile	December 26, 2011	N/A
Clausura changes
Colón	Mario Sciacqua	Resigned	February 20, 2012	Roberto Sensini	February 21, 2012	16th
Banfield	Jorge da Silva	Resigned	February 27, 2012	Eduardo Acevedo	March 10, 2012	15th
Argentinos Juniors	Néstor Gorosito	Resigned	February 28, 2012	Leonardo Astrada	March 1, 2012	18th
Independiente	Ramón Díaz	Resigned	March 3, 2012	Cristian Díaz	March 5, 2012	20th
Atlético de Rafaela	Carlos Trullet	Sacked	March 12, 2012	Rubén Forestello	March 13, 2012	18th
Olimpo	Héctor Rivoira	Resigned	April 1, 2012	Walter Perazzo	April 4, 2012	20th
San Lorenzo	Leonardo Madelón	Resigned	April 1, 2012	Ricardo Caruso Lombardi	April 3, 2012	17th
Racing	Alfio Basile	Resigned	April 14, 2012	Luis Zubeldía	April 15, 2012	16th
San Martín (SJ)	Daniel Garnero	Resigned	April 21, 2012	Facundo Sava	April 23, 2012	19th
Estudiantes (LP)	Juan Manuel Azconzábal	Sacked	April 27, 2012	Martín Zuccarelli	April 27, 2012	9th

== Torneo Apertura ==
The 2011 Apertura was the first championship of the season. It began on August 5 and ended on February 4, 2012.

=== Standings ===
Pos	Team	Pld	W	D	L	GF	GA	GD	Pts	Qualification
1	Boca Juniors	19	12	7	0	25	6	+19	43	2012 Copa Libertadores Second Stage
2	Racing	19	7	10	2	16	8	+8	31	
3	Vélez Sarsfield	19	9	4	6	22	17	+5	31	
4	Belgrano	19	8	7	4	21	16	+5	31	
5	Colón	19	8	7	4	19	15	+4	31	
6	Lanús	19	7	8	4	20	14	+6	29	
7	Tigre	19	7	6	6	22	19	+3	27	
8	Independiente	19	7	6	6	18	17	+1	27	
9	San Martín (SJ)	19	6	8	5	17	14	+3	26	
10	Atlético de Rafaela	19	8	2	9	22	26	−4	26	
11	Unión	19	6	7	6	14	18	−4	25	
12	Godoy Cruz	19	6	6	7	28	24	+4	24	
13	Arsenal	19	6	6	7	21	20	+1	24	
14	Estudiantes (LP)	19	6	5	8	24	24	0	23	
15	Argentinos Juniors	19	5	7	7	18	24	−6	22	
16	All Boys	19	4	9	6	15	23	−8	21	
17	San Lorenzo	19	5	4	10	13	19	−6	19	
18	Newell's Old Boys	19	1	13	5	13	18	−5	16	
19	Olimpo	19	2	10	7	15	25	−10	16	
20	Banfield	19	3	2	14	13	29	−16	11	

Primera División
2011 Apertura champion

30th title

=== Results ===
Home \ Away	ALL	ARJ	ARS	ATR	BAN	BEL	BOC	COL	EST	GCR	IND	LAN	NOB	OLI	RAC	SLO	SMJ	TIG	USF	VEL
All Boys		1–0		1–2	0–1	1–1				1–1	2–2	0–0	1–1	1–2	0–0					
Argentinos Juniors			2–1				0–0	0–0		1–0	0–0	0–4	1–1	1–0				0–1		3–1
Arsenal	1–2						2–2	1–2	1–2	1–2						1–0	2–0		2–1	0–1
Atlético de Rafaela		3–1	1–3			0–0				0–2	1–3	2–1	0–0	3–1						2–0
Banfield		2–2	0–1	0–2		0–2					3–0	1–2	2–0	1–1	0–1					
Belgrano		1–2	1–0					0–1		1–1	2–0	0–0	2–3	1–1						1–3
Boca Juniors	1–0			3–1	3–0	0–0			1–0						0–0	1–1	1–0	1–0	4–0	
Colón	1–1			1–0	4–1		0–2		1–1						0–2	3–1	0–0		0–2	
Estudiantes (LP)	3–0	4–3		3–0	2–1	2–3									0–0	0–2	2–2	1–3	2–0	
Godoy Cruz	6–1				1–0		1–2	0–1	3–1							2–0	2–2		1–1	1–1
Independiente			0–0				0–1	0–1	1–0	2–1			1–1	3–0			2–1	2–1		0–1
Lanús			0–1				1–2	1–1	2–1	2–1	1–0		2–2	0–0				0–0		1–2
Newell's Old Boys			0–0				0–1	0–0	0–0	1–1				2–2		0–0	0–0	0–1		1–1
Olimpo			2–2				0–0	0–1	0–0	2–2						1–1	0–3	1–1	0–1	2–1
Racing		1–0	0–0	1–0		2–3				3–0	1–1	1–1	1–0	1–0						
San Lorenzo	0–1	3–1		1–3	1–0	0–1					0–1	0–1			0–0			1–0	0–1	
San Martín (SJ)	0–0	0–0		2–1	2–1	0–1						0–0			0–0	1–0		2–1	2–0	
Tigre	1–1		2–2	3–0	1–0	0–1		2–1		2–1					1–1					1–3
Unión	1–1	1–1		0–1	1–0	0–0					0–0	0–1	2–1		1–1			1–1		
Vélez Sarsfield	0–1				3–0		0–0	1–1	1–0						1–0	1–2	1–0		0–1	

Legend: Blue = home team win; Yellow = draw; Red = away team win.

=== Top goalscorers ===
Rank	Name	Nationality	Club	Goals
1	Rubén Ramírez	Argentine	Godoy Cruz	12
2	Mauro Matos	Argentine	All Boys	7
2	César Pereyra	Argentine	Belgrano	7
2	Santiago Salcedo	Paraguayan	Argentinos Juniors	7
5	Alexis Castro	Argentine	Atlético de Rafaela	6
5	Facundo Ferreyra	Argentine	Banfield	6
5	Darío Gandín	Argentine	Atlético de Rafaela	6
5	Teófilo Gutiérrez	Colombian	Racing	6
5	Martín Rolle	Argentine	Olimpo	6
10	Mauro Boselli	Argentine	Estudiantes	5
10	Darío Cvitanich	Argentine	Boca Juniors	5
10	Gastón Fernández	Argentine	Estudiantes	5
10	Guillermo Franco	Mexican	Vélez Sársfield	5
10	Esteban Fuertes	Argentine	Colón	5
10	Federico Higuaín	Argentine	Colón	5
10	Diego Morales	Argentine	Tigre	5
10	Mauro Obolo	Argentine	Arsenal	5
10	Mario Regueiro	Uruguayan	Lanús	5
10	Paulo Rosales	Argentine	Unión	5

== Torneo Clausura ==
The 2012 Clausura was the second and final championship of the season. It started on February 10 and ended on June 24, 2012.

=== Standings ===
Pos	Team	Pld	W	D	L	GF	GA	GD	Pts	Qualification
1	Arsenal	19	11	5	3	30	15	+15	38	2013 Copa Libertadores Second Stage
2	Tigre	19	10	6	3	29	15	+14	36	
3	Vélez Sarsfield	19	9	6	4	26	15	+11	33	
4	Boca Juniors	19	9	6	4	30	20	+10	33	
5	All Boys	19	9	6	4	21	13	+8	33	
6	Newell's Old Boys	19	9	5	5	26	19	+7	32	
7	Colón	19	7	8	4	24	18	+6	29	
8	Argentinos Juniors	19	7	6	6	17	15	+2	27	
9	Estudiantes (LP)	19	7	6	6	23	24	−1	27	
10	Lanús	19	7	5	7	19	18	+1	26	
11	Unión	19	5	10	4	21	20	+1	25	
12	San Lorenzo	19	6	7	6	22	23	−1	25	
13	Atlético de Rafaela	19	6	6	7	26	24	+2	24	
14	Belgrano	19	6	6	7	17	20	−3	24	
15	San Martín (SJ)	19	6	4	9	21	29	−8	22	
16	Independiente	19	5	5	9	22	28	−6	20	
17	Racing	19	5	4	10	19	27	−8	19	
18	Godoy Cruz	19	2	8	9	11	25	−14	14	
19	Olimpo	19	3	4	12	20	34	−14	13	
20	Banfield	19	2	5	12	15	37	−22	11	

Primera División
2012 Clausura champion

1st title

=== Results ===
Home \ Away	ALL	ARJ	ARS	ATR	BAN	BEL	BOC	COL	EST	GCR	IND	LAN	NOB	OLI	RAC	SLO	SMJ	TIG	USF	VEL
All Boys			0–2				3–1	2–0	3–1	1–1						0–0	1–0	2–0	2–1	0–0
Argentinos Juniors	1–0			0–0	1–0	0–0			1–2						2–1	0–1	1–1		0–0	
Arsenal		3–1		2–2	1–0	1–0					3–1	3–1	1–1	2–1	0–0			1–0		
Atlético de Rafaela	0–1				3–0		2–2	0–0	3–2						4–2	2–1	3–1	1–1	0–2	
Banfield	0–0						1–1	0–3	0–3	1–1						1–1	1–2	0–2	2–2	0–4
Belgrano	0–0			1–1	3–1		1–1		2–1						0–1	1–2	1–1	1–1	1–0	
Boca Juniors		2–1	0–3					1–0		3–0	4–5	2–2	2–0	2–0						0–0
Colón		1–0	0–0			2–0				2–0	3–0	1–0	0–3	3–1				1–1		0–2
Estudiantes (LP)			1–1				0–3	2–2		1–0	2–0	1–0	1–1	1–0						0–2
Godoy Cruz		1–1	0–1	1–3		2–1					0–0	0–1	1–1	1–1	1–0			0–2		
Independiente	0–3	1–3		2–0	2–0	2–0						0–1			4–1	0–0			0–0	
Lanús	1–0	0–1		1–0	2–1	0–1									3–1	4–1	1–3		0–0	
Newell's Old Boys	1–1	1–0		1–0	3–0	0–2					2–1	0–0			2–0				3–1	
Olimpo	1–2	0–0		2–1	2–5	4–1					2–1	2–2	1–2		0–3					
Racing	3–0				1–2		0–2	1–1	1–0							1–1	1–0	0–0	0–3	1–2
San Lorenzo			2–0				0–2	1–1	1–1	3–0			3–2	1–1			3–1			0–2
San Martín (SJ)			1–4				0–1	2–2	0–1	1–0	1–0		2–1	3–2						1–3
Tigre		1–2					2–1		1–1		2–2	1–0	3–1	1–0		3–1	3–1		4–0	
Unión			1–0				0–0	2–2	2–2	1–1				2–0		1–0	0–0			3–3
Vélez Sarsfield		0–2	3–2	2–1		0–1				1–1	1–1	0–0	0–1	1–0				0–1		

Legend: Blue = home team win; Yellow = draw; Red = away team win.

=== Top goalscorers ===
Rank	Name	Club	Goals
1	Carlos Luna	Club Atlético Tigre	12
2	Gastón Caprari	San Martín (SJ)	8
3	Ernesto Farías	Independiente	7
3	Esteban Fuertes	Colón	7
3	Darío Gandín	Atlético de Rafaela	7
3	Emanuel Gigliotti	San Lorenzo	7
3	Mariano Pavone	Lanús	7

Source: Soccerway

== Relegation ==
Pos	Team	2009–10 Pts	2010–11 Pts	2011–12 Pts	Total Pts	Total Pld	Avg	Relegation
1	Vélez Sársfield	61	82	64	207	114	1.816	
2	Estudiantes (LP)	71	69	50	190	114	1.667	
3	Lanús	60	63	55	178	114	1.561	
4	Boca Juniors	47	53	76	176	114	1.544	
5	Argentinos Juniors	73	54	49	176	114	1.544	
6	Arsenal	46	57	62	165	114	1.447	
7	Belgrano	—	—	55	55	38	1.447	
8	Colón	55	47	60	162	114	1.421	
9	Newell's Old Boys	69	42	48	159	114	1.395	
10	Independiente	68	43	47	158	114	1.386	
11	All Boys	—	51	54	105	76	1.382	
12	Godoy Cruz	53	63	38	154	114	1.351	
13	Unión	—	—	50	50	38	1.316	
14	Atlético de Rafaela	—	—	50	50	38	1.316	
15	Racing	46	52	50	148	114	1.298	
16	Tigre	32	50	63	145	114	1.272	
17	San Martín (SJ)	—	—	48	48	38	1.263	Relegation Playoff Matches
18	San Lorenzo	52	47	44	143	114	1.254	Relegation Playoff Matches
19	Banfield	73	47	22	142	114	1.246	Primera B Nacional
20	Olimpo	—	48	29	77	76	1.013	Primera B Nacional

=== Relegation/promotion playoffs ===
The 17th and 18th placed teams in the relegation table (San Martín (San Juan) and San Lorenzo, respectively) played the 3rd and 4th-place finishers of the 2011–12 Primera B Nacional season (Instituto and Rosario Central, respectively); the winner of each claiming a spot in the following Primera División season. The Primera División team (Team 1) played the second leg at home with sporty advantage if the aggregate would have been drawn. Both San Lorenzo and San Martín (San Juan) remained in the Primera División. These were the last promotions played between Argentine Primera División and Primera B Nacional teams.

Team 1	Agg.	Team 2	1st leg	2nd leg
Relegation/promotion playoff 1
San Martín (SJ)	0–0	Rosario Central	0–0	0–0
Relegation/promotion playoff 2
San Lorenzo	3–1	Instituto	2–0	1–1

== International qualification ==
The 2011–12 Primera League table contributes towards qualifying for CONMEBOL tournaments in 2012 and 2013.

=== 2012 CONMEBOL Tournaments ===
International qualification for the 2012 season presented a change from previous ones. Qualification for the first four Copa Libertadores berths comprises the previous season's Clausura champion, this season's Apertura champion, and the top two non-champions in an aggregate table of the aforementioned tournaments). The fifth Copa Libertadores berth was given to the best team in the Copa Sudamericana who has not already qualified otherwise.

Qualification to the Copa Sudamericana was determined through the same aggregate table as the Copa Libertadores. However, the six berths went to the top five teams that have not qualified for the Copa Libertadores and who were not participating in the relegation/promotion playoffs, and the Copa Argentina champion.

Pos	Team	Pld	W	D	L	GF	GA	GD	Pts	Qualification
1	Boca Juniors	38	21	13	4	49	28	+21	76	2012 Copa Libertadores Second Stage and 2012 Copa Sudamericana Second Stage (Note: Boca Juniors is qualified for the 2012 Copa Sudamericana as the 2011–12 Copa Argentina champion.) (Note: Vélez Sársfield and Boca Juniors are qualified for the 2012 Copa Libertadores as the 2011 Clausura and 2011 Apertura champions, respectively.)
2	Vélez Sarsfield	38	21	7	10	58	34	+24	70	2012 Copa Libertadores Second Stage
3	Lanús	38	17	13	8	49	30	+19	64	2012 Copa Libertadores Second Stage
4	Godoy Cruz	38	16	10	12	61	52	+9	58	2012 Copa Libertadores Second Stage
5	Independiente	38	14	14	10	48	37	+11	56	2012 Copa Sudamericana Second Stage
6	Racing	38	14	12	12	41	34	+7	54	2012 Copa Sudamericana Second Stage
7	Tigre	38	13	13	12	47	45	+2	52	2012 Copa Sudamericana Second Stage
8	Argentinos Juniors	38	12	16	10	34	35	−1	52	2012 Copa Sudamericana Second Stage
9	Colón	38	14	10	14	39	42	−3	52	2012 Copa Sudamericana Second Stage
10	Arsenal	38	12	13	13	46	42	+4	49	2012 Copa Libertadores First Stage (Note: Arsenal is qualified for the 2012 Copa Libertadores as the second-best Argentine team in the 2011 Copa Sudamericana, as Vélez Sársfield had qualified for the 2012 Copa Libertadores Second Stage.)
11	Estudiantes (LP)	38	12	11	15	42	43	−1	47	
12	Olimpo	38	10	16	12	43	48	−5	46	
13	All Boys	38	11	13	14	29	42	−13	46	
14	San Lorenzo	38	10	12	16	33	35	−2	42	
15	Banfield	38	10	8	20	37	53	−16	38	
16	Newell's Old Boys	38	5	17	16	29	50	−21	32	
17	Belgrano	19	8	7	4	21	16	+5	31	
18	San Martín (SJ)	19	6	8	5	17	14	+3	26	
19	Atlético de Rafaela	19	8	2	9	22	26	−4	26	
20	Unión	19	6	7	6	14	18	−4	25	

Rules for classification: 1st points; 2nd goal difference; 3rd goals scored; 4th head-to-head points; 5th head-to-head goal difference; 6th head-to-head goals scored.

=== 2013 Copa Libertadores ===
The winner of the Clausura 2012 tournament (Arsenal) qualified directly. Other teams will qualify based on their combined points in Clausura 2012 and Inicial 2012.
