= 2009–10 Argentine Primera División season =

119th season of top-tier football league in Argentina

Primera División
- Season: 2009–10
- Champions: Apertura: Banfield (1st title); Clausura: Argentinos Juniors (3rd title)
- Relegated: Chacarita Juniors; Atlético Tucumán; Rosario Central
- 2010 Copa Libertadores: Banfield; Lanús; Colón; Newell's Old Boys
- 2011 Copa Libertadores: Argentinos Juniors
- 2010 Copa Sudamericana: Argentinos Juniors; Newell's Old Boys; Estudiantes (LP); Banfield; Independiente; Vélez Sarsfield
- Matches: 380
- Goals: 948 (2.49 per match)
- Top goalscorer: Apertura: Santiago Silva (14 goals); Clausura: Mauro Boselli (13 goals); Season: Mauro Boselli (22 goals)
- Biggest home win: Newell's Old Boys 6–0 Gimnasia y Esgrima (LP) (8 May 2010)
- Biggest away win: River Plate 1–5 Tigre (15 May 2010)
- Highest scoring: Lanús 3–6 Argentinos Juniors (6 February 2010)

The 2009–10 Primera División season was the 119th season of top-flight professional football in Argentina. A total of 20 teams competed in the season, which started on 21 August 2009 and ended on 23 May 2010.

== Changes from 2008–09 ==
The major changes for this season apply to international qualification. For the 2010 Copa Libertadores, an aggregate table of the two tournaments held in 2009 (2009 Clausura and 2009 Apertura) will be taken into account, instead of an average of the past three tournaments. For the 2010 Copa Sudamericana, River Plate and Boca Juniors will no longer be invited without merit. Their open berths will be up for qualification to any team, including themselves.

On 21 August, the Argentine Football Association revoked the television broadcasting contract with TyC in the hopes of increasing revenue to help the financially struggling clubs. On 18 August, the AFA and the Government of Argentina struck a deal to broadcast the season for free on non-cable channels, which allowed the season to start on the 21st.

== Club information ==
Locations of the 2009–10 Primera División teams outside Greater Buenos Aires
Locations of the 2009–10 Primera División teams within Greater Buenos Aires

Twenty clubs will participate in the 2009–10 season, with eighteen sides remaining from the previous season. Gimnasia y Esgrima de Jujuy and San Martín de Tucumán were relegated at the end of the 2008–09 season. They were replaced by Chacarita Juniors and Atlético Tucumán, both of whom were promoted from the Primera B Nacional. Rosario Central and Gimnasia y Esgrima (LP) played the relegation/promotion playoffs against Belgrano and Atlético de Rafaela, respectively. Both Gimnasia y Esgrima and Rosario Central won their playoff matches and retained their status in top-flight football.

| Club | City | Stadium | Capacity |
|---|---|---|---|
| Argentinos Juniors | Buenos Aires | Diego Armando Maradona | 24,800 |
| Arsenal | Sarandí | Julio H. Grondona | 16,300 |
| Atlético Tucumán | Tucumán | Monumental Presidente José Fierro | 30,000 |
| Banfield | Banfield | Florencio Solá | 40,500 |
| Boca Juniors | Buenos Aires | Alberto J. Armando | 49,000 |
| Colón | Santa Fe | Brigadier General Estanislao López | 32,500 |
| Chacarita Juniors | Villa Maipú | Chacarita Juniors | 24,300 |
| Estudiantes (LP) | La Plata | Centenario | 30,200 |
| Gimnasia y Esgrima (LP) | La Plata | Juan Carlos Zerillo | 24,544 |
| Godoy Cruz | Godoy Cruz | Malvinas Argentinas | 40,268 |
| Huracán | Buenos Aires | Tomás Adolfo Ducó | 48,314 |
| Independiente | Avellaneda | Libertadores de América | 32,500 |
| Lanús | Lanús | Ciudad de Lanús – Néstor Díaz Pérez | 46,619 |
| Newell's Old Boys | Rosario | Marcelo Bielsa | 38,095 |
| Racing Club | Avellaneda | Presidente Juan Domingo Perón | 51,389 |
| River Plate | Buenos Aires | Monumental Antonio V. Liberti | 57,901 |
| Rosario Central | Rosario | Dr. Lisandro de la Torre | 41,824 |
| San Lorenzo | Buenos Aires | Pedro Bidegain | 43,494 |
| Tigre | Victoria | Monumental de Victoria | 26,282 |
| Vélez Sársfield | Buenos Aires | José Amalfitani | 49,540 |

1.Chacarita Juniors played all their home games on Argentinos Juniors' Diego Armando Maradona stadium.
2.Estudiantes' own stadium is undergoing renovation and the team is playing in Quilmes.
3.The first match Independiente played in Estadio Libertadores de América after reconstruction was on 28 October 2009. Prior to that, Independiente used Estadio Ciudad de Lanús.
4.Newell's Old Boys changed the name of their stadium to Estadio Marcelo Bielsa from Estadio Newell's Old Boys on 22 December 2009.

=== Personnel and kits ===
| Club | Manager | Kit manufacturer | Main sponsor |
|---|---|---|---|
| Argentinos Juniors | (Argentina) Claudio Borghi | Diadora | Liderar Seguros |
| Arsenal | (Argentina) Carlos Ruiz (interim) | Mitre | Liderar Seguros |
| Atlético Tucumán | (Argentina) Roberto Carlos Mario Gómez | Topper | Ingenio San Juan |
| Banfield | (Argentina) Sebastián Ariel Méndez | Mitre | Bingo Lomas |
| Boca Juniors | (Argentina) Roberto Pompei (interim) | Nike | LG |
| Colón | (Argentina) Mario Sciacqua | Umbro | La Nueva Seguros/Flecha Bus |
| Chacarita Juniors | (Argentina) Luis Marabotto | TBS | La Nueva Seguros |
| Estudiantes (LP) | (Argentina) Hernán Darío Ortiz | Topper | RCA |
| Gimnasia y Esgrima (LP) | (Argentina) Diego Cocca | Kappa | La Nueva Seguros |
| Godoy Cruz | (Argentina) Omar Asad | Lotto | Mendoza |
| Huracán | (Argentina) Héctor Rivoira | Kappa | Motomel |
| Independiente | (Argentina) Américo Gallego | Puma | Motomel |
| Lanús | (Argentina) Luis Zubeldía | Signia | Bingo Lanús |
| Newell's Old Boys | (Argentina) Roberto Sensini | Topper | Motomel |
| Racing | (Argentina) Miguel Ángel Russo | Penalty | Banco Macro |
| River Plate | (Argentina) Ángel Cappa | Adidas | Petrobras |
| Rosario Central | (Argentina) Leonardo Madelón | Puma | Ingeconser |
| San Lorenzo | (Argentina) Sebastián Ariel Méndez (interim) | Lotto | Walmart |
| Tigre | (Argentina) Ricardo Caruso Lombardi | Diadora | Banco Macro |
| Vélez Sársfield | (Argentina) Ricardo Gareca | Penalty | Mondial |

=== Managerial changes ===
| Team | Outgoing manager | Manner of departure | Date of vacancy | Replaced by | Date of appointment | Position in table |
Pre-season changes
| Boca Juniors | Abel Álves (interim) | End of contract | 5 July 2009 | Alfio Basile | 6 July 2009 | N/A |
| Rosario Central | Miguel Ángel Russo | Resigned | 13 July 2009 | Ariel Cuffaro Russo | 22 July 2009 | N/A |
Apertura changes
| Chacarita Juniors | Ricardo Zielinski | Resigned | 20 September 2009 | Fernando Gamboa | 21 September 2009 | 20th |
| River Plate | Néstor Gorosito | Resigned | 4 October 2009 | Leonardo Astrada | 6 October 2009 | 16th |
| Racing | Ricardo Caruso Lombardi | Resigned | 8 October 2009 | Juan Barbas (interim) | 10 October 2009 | 18th |
| Atlético Tucumán | Héctor Rivoira | Resigned | 2 November 2009 | Salvador Mónaco (interim) & Ricardo Salomón (interim) | 4 November 2009 | 17th |
| Racing | Juan Barbas (interim) | End of contract | 2 November 2009 | Claudio Vivas | 3 November 2009 | 18th |
| Godoy Cruz | Diego Cocca | Sacked | 3 November 2009 | Daniel Oldrá (interim) | 3 November 2009 | 15th |
| Godoy Cruz | Daniel Oldrá (interim) | End of contract | 8 November 2009 | Enzo Trossero | 9 November 2009 | 15th |
| Atlético Tucumán | Salvador Mónaco (interim) & Ricardo Salomón (interim) | End of contract | 11 November 2009 | Osvaldo Sosa | 11 November 2009 | 14th |
| Huracán | Ángel Cappa | Resigned | 24 November 2009 | Héctor Martínez (interim) | 25 November 2009 | 19th |
| Gimnasia y Esgrima (LP) | Leonardo Madelón | Resigned | 2 December 2009 | Pablo Morant (interim) & Darío Ortíz (interim) | 2 December 2009 | 18th |
| Huracán | Héctor Martínez (interim) | End of contract | 3 December 2009 | Héctor Rivoira | 3 December 2009 | 19th |
| Gimnasia y Esgrima (LP) | Pablo Morant (interim) & Darío Ortíz (interim) | End of contract | 4 December 2009 | Pablo César Fernández | 4 December 2009 | 18th |
Inter-tournament changes
| Tigre | Diego Cagna | Resigned | 14 December 2009 | Ricardo Caruso Lombardi | 16 December 2009 | 20th |
| Gimnasia y Esgrima (LP) | Pablo César Fernández | Sacked | 16 December 2009 | Diego Cocca | 24 December 2009 | 18th |
| Godoy Cruz | Enzo Trossero | End of contract | 29 December 2009 | Omar Asad | 30 December 2009 | 17th |
| Boca Juniors | Alfio Basile | Resigned | 21 January 2010 | Abel Álves (interim) | 22 January 2010 | N/A |
Clausura changes
| Racing | Claudio Vivas | Sacked | 15 February 2010 | Miguel Ángel Russo | 17 February 2010 | 16th |
| Atlético Tucumán | Osvaldo Sosa | Sacked | 8 March 2010 | Mario Gómez | 8 March 2010 | 19th |
| Chacarita Juniors | Fernando Gamboa | Sacked | 21 March 2010 | Mauro Navas | 22 March 2010 | 16th |
| Rosario Central | Ariel Cuffaro Russo | Sacked | 28 March 2010 | Leonardo Madelón | 29 March 2010 | 19th |
| San Lorenzo | Diego Simeone | Resigned | 3 April 2010 | Sebastián Méndez (interim) | 4 April 2010 | 17th |
| Boca Juniors | Abel Álves (interim) | Sacked | 8 April 2010 | Roberto Pompei (interim) | 9 April 2010 | 19th |
| River Plate | Leonardo Astrada | Sacked | 12 April 2010 | Ángel Cappa | 12 April 2010 | 17th |
| Chacarita Juniors | Mauro Navas | Sacked | 19 April 2010 | Luis Marabotto | 21 April 2010 | 18th |
| Arsenal | Jorge Burruchaga | Resigned | 29 April 2010 | Carlos Ruiz (interim) | 2 May 2010 | 16th |

== Torneo Apertura ==
The Torneo Apertura was scheduled to begin on 14 August 2009 and end on 13 December 2009. However, the AFA delayed the start of the tournament until 21 August 2009 due to financial debts in some clubs.

=== Standings ===
| Pos | Team | Pld | W | D | L | GF | GA | GD | Pts | Qualification |
|---|---|---|---|---|---|---|---|---|---|---|
| 1 | Banfield | 19 | 12 | 5 | 2 | 25 | 11 | +14 | 41 | 2010 Copa Libertadores Second Stage |
| 2 | Newell's Old Boys | 19 | 12 | 3 | 4 | 26 | 15 | +11 | 39 | |
| 3 | Colón | 19 | 10 | 4 | 5 | 27 | 16 | +11 | 34 | |
| 4 | Independiente | 19 | 10 | 4 | 5 | 30 | 20 | +10 | 34 | |
| 5 | Vélez Sarsfield | 19 | 10 | 4 | 5 | 29 | 21 | +8 | 34 | |
| 6 | Argentinos Juniors | 19 | 8 | 8 | 3 | 29 | 20 | +9 | 32 | |
| 7 | San Lorenzo | 19 | 9 | 5 | 5 | 28 | 20 | +8 | 32 | |
| 8 | Estudiantes (LP) | 19 | 9 | 4 | 6 | 28 | 19 | +9 | 31 | |
| 9 | Lanús | 19 | 8 | 7 | 4 | 26 | 17 | +9 | 31 | |
| 10 | Rosario Central | 19 | 8 | 7 | 4 | 21 | 14 | +7 | 31 | |
| 11 | Boca Juniors | 19 | 7 | 6 | 6 | 28 | 24 | +4 | 27 | |
| 12 | Arsenal | 19 | 7 | 6 | 6 | 20 | 24 | −4 | 27 | |
| 13 | Atlético Tucumán | 19 | 6 | 4 | 9 | 24 | 32 | −8 | 22 | |
| 14 | River Plate | 19 | 5 | 6 | 8 | 23 | 26 | −3 | 21 | |
| 15 | Chacarita Juniors | 19 | 5 | 4 | 10 | 18 | 25 | −7 | 19 | |
| 16 | Racing | 19 | 4 | 5 | 10 | 17 | 26 | −9 | 17 | |
| 17 | Godoy Cruz | 19 | 3 | 7 | 9 | 18 | 28 | −10 | 16 | |
| 18 | Gimnasia y Esgrima (LP) | 19 | 3 | 4 | 12 | 16 | 29 | −13 | 13 | |
| 19 | Huracán | 19 | 2 | 5 | 12 | 12 | 34 | −22 | 11 | |
| 20 | Tigre | 19 | 2 | 2 | 15 | 18 | 42 | −24 | 8 | |

Rules for classification: 1st points; 2nd goal difference; 3rd goals scored; 4th head-to-head points; 5th head-to-head goal difference; 6th head-to-head goals scored. This does not apply to determining the champion. If two or more teams had been tied in point at the end of the tournament, a playoff would have been held at a neutral venue within 72 hours for the championship

Primera División
2009 Apertura champion

1st title

=== Results ===
| Home \ Away | ARJ | ARS | ATU | BAN | BOC | CHA | COL | EST | GLP | GCR | HUR | IND | LAN | NOB | RAC | RIV | RCE | SLO | TIG | VEL |
|---|---|---|---|---|---|---|---|---|---|---|---|---|---|---|---|---|---|---|---|---|
| Argentinos Juniors | | 1–1 | 2–1 | 1–1 | | | | 1–0 | | | 5–1 | | 0–0 | | 2–0 | 1–2 | 1–1 | 2–1 | | |
| Arsenal | | | 2–0 | 1–1 | 1–1 | | | 0–2 | 1–0 | | | 1–0 | 2–5 | | 0–0 | 1–0 | 1–0 | | | |
| Atlético Tucumán | | | | | 2–0 | 2–1 | 2–0 | | 1–0 | 1–1 | | 2–4 | 2–2 | | | | | | 4–2 | 1–2 |
| Banfield | | | 1–1 | | | 1–0 | | 2–1 | | 3–0 | | | | 2–1 | 1–2 | 2–0 | | | 1–0 | 3–0 |
| Boca Juniors | 2–2 | | | 2–0 | | 3–0 | 0–0 | | 4–0 | 2–3 | | 1–2 | | 1–1 | | | | | 2–1 | 3–2 |
| Chacarita Juniors | 2–2 | 1–0 | | | | | | | | 2–1 | 1–0 | | | 0–1 | | | 0–1 | 0–2 | 1–2 | 0–0 |
| Colón | 2–0 | 4–1 | | 0–0 | | 3–1 | | | | 1–0 | 3–0 | | | 0–1 | | | | 2–1 | 5–1 | 0–1 |
| Estudiantes (LP) | | | 1–0 | | 2–1 | 0–0 | 0–1 | | 3–0 | | | 2–1 | 1–1 | | | | | | 3–1 | 3–0 |
| Gimnasia y Esgrima (LP) | 1–2 | | | 0–1 | | 2–0 | 1–2 | | | 0–2 | 4–1 | | | 0–2 | | | | 2–2 | 2–0 | 0–1 |
| Godoy Cruz | 2–4 | 0–0 | | | | | | 1–2 | | | 1–1 | | | 1–1 | 3–1 | 1–1 | 1–1 | 1–1 | | |
| Huracán | | 1–1 | 0–2 | 0–1 | 0–0 | | | 1–4 | | | | | 1–2 | | 3–1 | 0–0 | 1–0 | 0–2 | | |
| Independiente | 1–1 | | | 1–2 | | 1–1 | 3–2 | | 1–0 | 2–0 | 2–0 | | | 0–1 | | | | | 2–0 | 2–2 |
| Lanús | | | | 1–2 | 1–2 | 0–3 | 3–0 | | 2–0 | 1–0 | | 0–0 | | 0–2 | | | | | 4–0 | 1–1 |
| Newell's Old Boys | 0–1 | | 3–0 | | | | | 2–1 | | | 1–0 | | | | 1–0 | 2–1 | 2–2 | 0–2 | | |
| Racing | | | 4–0 | | 1–2 | 0–2 | 1–1 | 1–0 | 1–1 | | | 1–2 | 1–1 | | | | | | 1–0 | |
| River Plate | | | 3–1 | | 1–1 | 4–3 | 0–0 | 1–1 | 2–2 | | | 1–3 | 0–1 | | 2–0 | | | | | |
| Rosario Central | | | 1–1 | 0–0 | 2–1 | | 0–1 | 3–0 | 1–1 | | | 2–0 | 0–0 | | 1–0 | 2–1 | | | | |
| San Lorenzo | | 3–2 | 3–1 | 0–1 | 3–0 | | | 2–2 | | | | 0–3 | 0–1 | | 0–0 | 2–1 | 1–0 | | | |
| Tigre | 1–1 | 1–2 | | | | | | | | 2–0 | 2–2 | | | 1–2 | | 0–2 | 1–2 | 2–3 | | 0–3 |
| Vélez Sarsfield | 1–0 | 3–1 | | | | | | | | 2–0 | 2–0 | | | 1–2 | 4–2 | 3–1 | 1–2 | 0–0 | | |

Legend: Blue = home team win; Yellow = draw; Red = away team win.

=== Top ten goalscorers ===
| Pos | Player | Team | Goals |
|---|---|---|---|
| 1 | (Uruguay) Santiago Silva | Banfield | 14 |
| 2 | (Argentina) Federico Nieto | Colón | 12 |
| 3 | (Uruguay) Joaquín Boghossian | Newell's Old Boys | 11 |
| 4 | (Argentina) Darío Gandín | Independiente | 10 |
| 4 | (Argentina) Gabriel Hauche | Argentinos Juniors | 10 |
| 6 | (Argentina) Mauro Boselli | Estudiantes (LP) | 9 |
| 7 | (Argentina) Diego Buonanotte | River Plate | 8 |
| 8 | (Argentina) Esteban Fuertes | Colón | 6 |
| 8 | (Argentina) Franco Jara | Arsenal | 6 |
| 8 | (Argentina) Martín Palermo | Boca Juniors | 6 |
| 8 | (Argentina) Facundo Parra | Chacarita Juniors | 6 |
| 8 | (Argentina) Luis Rodríguez | Atlético Tucumán | 6 |
| 8 | (Paraguay) Santiago Salcedo | Lanús | 6 |

== Torneo Clausura ==
=== Standings ===
| Pos | Team | Pld | W | D | L | GF | GA | GD | Pts | Qualification |
|---|---|---|---|---|---|---|---|---|---|---|
| 1 | Argentinos Juniors | 19 | 12 | 5 | 2 | 35 | 23 | +12 | 41 | 2011 Copa Libertadores Second Stage |
| 2 | Estudiantes (LP) | 19 | 12 | 4 | 3 | 33 | 14 | +19 | 40 | |
| 3 | Godoy Cruz | 19 | 11 | 4 | 4 | 28 | 14 | +14 | 37 | |
| 4 | Independiente | 19 | 10 | 4 | 5 | 25 | 18 | +7 | 34 | |
| 5 | Banfield | 19 | 9 | 5 | 5 | 24 | 16 | +8 | 32 | |
| 6 | Newell's Old Boys | 19 | 8 | 6 | 5 | 32 | 18 | +14 | 30 | |
| 7 | Lanús | 19 | 8 | 5 | 6 | 25 | 23 | +2 | 29 | |
| 8 | Racing | 19 | 9 | 2 | 8 | 21 | 22 | −1 | 29 | |
| 9 | Vélez Sarsfield | 19 | 7 | 6 | 6 | 25 | 20 | +5 | 27 | |
| 10 | Huracán | 19 | 7 | 5 | 7 | 21 | 22 | −1 | 26 | |
| 11 | Tigre | 19 | 7 | 3 | 9 | 28 | 26 | +2 | 24 | |
| 12 | Gimnasia y Esgrima (LP) | 19 | 6 | 6 | 7 | 21 | 29 | −8 | 24 | |
| 13 | River Plate | 19 | 6 | 4 | 9 | 16 | 21 | −5 | 22 | |
| 14 | Colón | 19 | 4 | 9 | 6 | 20 | 32 | −12 | 21 | |
| 15 | San Lorenzo | 19 | 6 | 2 | 11 | 16 | 21 | −5 | 20 | |
| 16 | Boca Juniors | 19 | 5 | 5 | 9 | 28 | 35 | −7 | 20 | |
| 17 | Rosario Central | 19 | 3 | 10 | 6 | 12 | 19 | −7 | 19 | |
| 18 | Arsenal | 19 | 5 | 4 | 10 | 19 | 33 | −14 | 19 | |
| 19 | Chacarita Juniors | 19 | 4 | 1 | 14 | 22 | 33 | −11 | 13 | |
| 20 | Atlético Tucumán | 19 | 1 | 10 | 8 | 14 | 26 | −12 | 13 | |

Rules for classification: 1st points; 2nd goal difference; 3rd goals scored; 4th head-to-head points; 5th head-to-head goal difference; 6th head-to-head goals scored. This does not apply to determining the champion. If two or more teams are tied in point at the end of the tournament, a playoff will be held at a neutral venue within 72 hours for the championship

Primera División
2010 Clausura champion

3rd title

=== Results ===
| Home \ Away | ARJ | ARS | ATU | BAN | BOC | CHA | COL | EST | GLP | GCR | HUR | IND | LAN | NOB | RAC | RIV | RCE | SLO | TIG | VEL |
|---|---|---|---|---|---|---|---|---|---|---|---|---|---|---|---|---|---|---|---|---|
| Argentinos Juniors | | | | | 2–2 | 2–1 | 3–1 | | 3–1 | 1–2 | | 4–3 | | 1–1 (Note: The match was postponed after sixty-five minutes of play due to intense rain with the score at 0–0. The other twenty-five minutes were played on 17 March.) | | | | | 1–1 | 1–0 |
| Arsenal | 2–2 | | | | | 0–3 | 3–0 | | | 1–2 | 0–1 | | | 0–2 | | | | 1–0 | 0–2 | 0–3 |
| Atlético Tucumán | 1–1 | 1–1 | | 0–0 | | | | 1–3 | | | 0–0 | | | 1–1 | 0–1 (Note: The match was postponed after twenty-two minutes of play due to intense rain. The other sixty-eight minutes were played on 21 April.) | 0–0 | 2–2 | 0–1 | | |
| Banfield | 3–0 (Note: The match was postponed after nine minutes of play due to intense rain with the score at 0–0. The other eighty-one minutes were played on 24 February.) | 0–0 | | | 3–0 | | 3–1 | | 3–2 | | 1–0 | 1–3 | 2–0 | | | | 0–0 | 2–0 | | |
| Boca Juniors | | 4–0 | 0–0 | | | | | 1–1 | | | 1–2 | | 3–1 | | 1–2 | 2–0 (Note: The match was postponed after eleven minutes of play due to intense rain with the score at 0–0. The other seventy-nine minutes were played on 25 March.) | 1–2 | 2–0 | | |
| Chacarita Juniors | | | 1–2 | 2–1 | 4–1 | | 1–2 | 1–2 | 0–1 | | | 0–1 | 1–2 | | 1–2 | 2–3 | | | | |
| Colón | | | 0–0 | | 3–0 | | | 1–4 | 1–1 | | | 1–1 | 1–1 | | 2–1 | 1–0 | 1–1 | | | |
| Estudiantes (LP) | 0–1 | 3–0 | | 1–1 | | | | | | 2–1 | 2–0 | | | 2–0 | 4–0 | 1–0 | 0–0 | 2–0 | | |
| Gimnasia y Esgrima (LP) | | 0–2 | 3–3 | | 1–0 | | | 3–1 | | | | 2–1 | 0–0 | | 1–0 | 1–1 | 1–1 | | | |
| Godoy Cruz | | | 2–1 | 2–0 | 1–1 | 1–0 | 3–0 | | 1–0 | | | 0–0 | 2–1 | | | | | | 6–2 | 2–0 |
| Huracán | 1–2 | | | | | 2–0 | 0–0 | | 3–1 | 0–0 | | 0–0 | | 2–1 | | | | | 2–3 | 3–2 |
| Independiente | | 1–0 | 3–1 | | 2–3 | | | 3–2 | | | | | 1–0 | | 1–0 | 2–0 | 2–0 | 0–1 | | |
| Lanús | 3–6 | 4–1 | 3–0 | | | | | 0–0 | | | 3–2 | | | | 1–0 | 1–0 | 0–0 | 3–2 | | |
| Newell's Old Boys | | | | 2–1 | 4–2 | 3–0 | 5–0 | | 6–0 | 2–1 | | 0–0 | 1–1 | | | | | | 0–2 | 1–1 |
| Racing | 0–1 | 2–4 | | 2–0 | | | | | | 0–0 | 1–1 | | | 1–0 | | 0–3 | 3–0 | 1–0 | | 3–1 |
| River Plate | 0–1 | 1–1 | | 0–1 | | | | | | 2–1 | 2–0 | | | 0–1 | | | 0–0 | 1–0 | 1–5 | 2–1 |
| Rosario Central | 0–1 | 2–3 | | | | 1–1 | | | | 1–0 | 0–2 | | | 1–1 | | | | 1–0 | 0–1 | 0–0 |
| San Lorenzo | 1–2 | | | | | 3–1 | 2–2 | | 0–1 | 0–1 | 3–0 | | | 2–1 | | | | | 1–0 | 0–0 |
| Tigre | | | 3–1 | 1–2 | 3–0 | 0–2 | 2–2 | 1–2 | 1–1 | | | 0–1 | 0–1 | | 1–2 | | | | | |
| Vélez Sarsfield | | | 1–0 | 0–0 | 4–4 | 4–1 | 1–1 | 0–1 | 2–1 | | | 3–0 | 1–0 | | | | | | 1–0 | |

Legend: Blue = home team win; Yellow = draw; Red = away team win.

=== Top ten goalscorers ===
| Pos | Player | Team | Goals |
|---|---|---|---|
| 1 | (Argentina) Mauro Boselli | Estudiantes (LP) | 13 |
| 2 | (Argentina) Martín Palermo | Boca Juniors | 10 |
| 2 | (Colombia) Marco Pérez | Gimnasia y Esgrima (LP) | 10 |
| 2 | (Argentina) Rubén Ramírez | Banfield | 10 |
| 5 | (Argentina) Carlos Luna | Tigre | 9 |
| 5 | (Argentina) Ismael Sosa | Argentinos Juniors | 9 |
| 7 | (Argentina) Facundo Parra | Chacarita Juniors | 8 |
| 8 | (Argentina) Federico Higuaín | Godoy Cruz | 7 |
| 8 | (Argentina) Leonel Núñez | Independiente | 7 |
| 8 | (Argentina) Andrés Silvera | Independiente | 7 |

== Relegation ==
| Pos | Team | 2007–08 Pts | 2008–09 Pts | 2009–10 Pts | Total Pts | Total Pld | Avg | Relegation |
|---|---|---|---|---|---|---|---|---|
| 1 | Estudiantes (LP) | 69 | 57 | 71 | 197 | 114 | 1.728 | |
| 2 | Lanús | 56 | 75 | 60 | 191 | 114 | 1.675 | |
| 3 | Vélez Sarsfield | 59 | 66 | 61 | 186 | 114 | 1.632 | |
| 4 | San Lorenzo | 64 | 63 | 52 | 179 | 114 | 1.57 | |
| 5 | Boca Juniors | 70 | 61 | 47 | 178 | 114 | 1.561 | |
| 6 | Newell's Old Boys | 56 | 52 | 69 | 177 | 114 | 1.553 | |
| 7 | Banfield | 54 | 46 | 73 | 173 | 114 | 1.518 | |
| 8 | Argentinos Juniors | 61 | 38 | 73 | 172 | 114 | 1.509 | |
| 9 | Independiente | 59 | 39 | 68 | 166 | 114 | 1.456 | |
| 10 | Colón | 45 | 57 | 55 | 157 | 114 | 1.377 | |
| 11 | Godoy Cruz | — | 49 | 53 | 102 | 76 | 1.342 | |
| 12 | River Plate | 66 | 41 | 43 | 150 | 114 | 1.316 | |
| 13 | Tigre | 56 | 62 | 32 | 150 | 114 | 1.316 | |
| 14 | Huracán | 52 | 58 | 37 | 147 | 114 | 1.289 | |
| 15 | Arsenal | 51 | 46 | 46 | 143 | 114 | 1.254 | |
| 16 | Racing | 40 | 52 | 46 | 138 | 114 | 1.211 | |
| 17 | Rosario Central | 41 | 40 | 50 | 131 | 114 | 1.149 | Relegation Playoff Matches |
| 18 | Gimnasia y Esgrima (LP) | 36 | 55 | 37 | 128 | 114 | 1.123 | Relegation Playoff Matches |
| 19 | Atlético Tucumán | — | — | 35 | 35 | 38 | 0.921 | Primera B Nacional |
| 20 | Chacarita Juniors | — | — | 32 | 32 | 38 | 0.842 | Primera B Nacional |

=== Relegation/promotion playoffs ===
| Team 1 | Agg. | Team 2 | 1st leg | 2nd leg |
Relegation/promotion playoff 1
| Rosario Central | 1–4 | All Boys | 1–1 | 0–3 |
Relegation/promotion playoff 2
| Gimnasia y Esgrima (LP) | 3–2 | Atlético de Rafaela | 0–1 | 3–1 |

All Boys won 4–1 and was promoted for the next season to Primera División, while Rosario Central was relegated to the Primera B Nacional. Gimnasia y Esgrima (LP) won 3–2 and stayed in the Primera División.

== International qualification ==
=== Copa Libertadores ===
The first two of Argentina's five allocated berths to the 2010 Copa Libertadores went to the 2009 Clausura champion (Vélez Sársfield) and the 2009 Apertura champion (Banfield). The remaining three berths went to the teams with the best average of the past two tournaments. Additionally, Estudiantes had a berth as the defending Copa Libertadores champion.

| Pos | Team | Pld | W | D | L | GF | GA | GD | Pts | Qualification |
|---|---|---|---|---|---|---|---|---|---|---|
| 1 | Vélez Sarsfield | 38 | 21 | 11 | 6 | 48 | 34 | +14 | 74 | 2010 Copa Libertadores Second Stage (Note: Vélez Sársfield qualified as the 2009 Clausura champion.) |
| 2 | Lanús | 38 | 20 | 9 | 9 | 58 | 43 | +15 | 69 | 2010 Copa Libertadores Second Stage |
| 3 | Colón | 38 | 20 | 8 | 10 | 56 | 35 | +21 | 68 | 2010 Copa Libertadores First Stage |
| 4 | Banfield | 38 | 18 | 10 | 10 | 50 | 36 | +14 | 64 | 2010 Copa Libertadores Second Stage (Note: Banfield qualified as the 2009 Apertura champion.) |
| 5 | Estudiantes (LP) | 38 | 17 | 9 | 12 | 50 | 37 | +13 | 60 | 2010 Copa Libertadores Second Stage (Note: Estudiantes qualified as the 2009 Copa Libertadores champion.) |
| 6 | Newell's Old Boys | 38 | 16 | 12 | 10 | 47 | 37 | +10 | 60 | 2010 Copa Libertadores First Stage |
| 7 | San Lorenzo | 38 | 16 | 8 | 14 | 55 | 46 | +9 | 56 | |
| 8 | Independiente | 38 | 16 | 7 | 15 | 52 | 56 | −4 | 55 | |
| 9 | Boca Juniors | 38 | 13 | 10 | 15 | 50 | 49 | +1 | 49 | |
| 10 | Huracán | 38 | 14 | 7 | 17 | 47 | 53 | −6 | 49 | |
| 11 | River Plate | 38 | 12 | 12 | 14 | 47 | 51 | −4 | 48 | |
| 12 | Argentinos Juniors | 38 | 10 | 17 | 11 | 48 | 52 | −4 | 47 | |
| 13 | Racing | 38 | 12 | 11 | 15 | 40 | 47 | −7 | 47 | |
| 14 | Arsenal | 38 | 11 | 12 | 15 | 39 | 54 | −15 | 45 | |
| 15 | Godoy Cruz | 38 | 10 | 12 | 16 | 41 | 54 | −13 | 42 | |
| 16 | Tigre | 38 | 8 | 7 | 23 | 42 | 57 | −15 | 31 | |

Source: AFA
Rules for classification: 1st points; 2nd goal difference; 3rd goals scored; 4th head-to-head points; 5th head-to-head goal difference; 6th head-to-head goals scored

=== Copa Sudamericana ===
Qualification for the 2010 Copa Sudamericana is determined by an aggregate table of the Apertura 2009 and Clausura 2010 tournaments. The top six teams in the aggregate table qualify. Boca Juniors and River Plate will no longer be invited to the tournament without merit.

| Pos | Team | Pld | W | D | L | GF | GA | GD | Pts | Qualification |
|---|---|---|---|---|---|---|---|---|---|---|
| 1 | Banfield | 38 | 21 | 10 | 7 | 49 | 27 | +22 | 73 | 2010 Copa Sudamericana Second Stage |
| 2 | Argentinos Juniors | 38 | 20 | 13 | 5 | 64 | 43 | +21 | 73 | 2010 Copa Sudamericana Second Stage |
| 3 | Estudiantes (LP) | 38 | 21 | 8 | 9 | 61 | 33 | +28 | 71 | 2010 Copa Sudamericana Second Stage |
| 4 | Newell's Old Boys | 38 | 20 | 9 | 9 | 58 | 33 | +25 | 69 | 2010 Copa Sudamericana Second Stage |
| 5 | Independiente | 38 | 20 | 8 | 10 | 55 | 38 | +17 | 68 | 2010 Copa Sudamericana Second Stage |
| 6 | Vélez Sarsfield | 38 | 17 | 10 | 11 | 54 | 41 | +13 | 61 | 2010 Copa Sudamericana Second Stage |
| 7 | Lanús | 38 | 16 | 12 | 10 | 51 | 40 | +11 | 60 | |
| 8 | Colón | 38 | 14 | 13 | 11 | 47 | 48 | −1 | 55 | |
| 9 | Godoy Cruz | 38 | 14 | 11 | 13 | 46 | 42 | +4 | 53 | |
| 10 | San Lorenzo | 38 | 15 | 7 | 16 | 44 | 41 | +3 | 52 | |
| 11 | Rosario Central | 38 | 11 | 17 | 10 | 33 | 33 | 0 | 50 | |
| 12 | Boca Juniors | 38 | 12 | 11 | 15 | 56 | 59 | −3 | 47 | |
| 13 | Racing | 38 | 13 | 7 | 18 | 38 | 48 | −10 | 46 | |
| 14 | Arsenal | 38 | 12 | 10 | 16 | 39 | 57 | −18 | 46 | |
| 15 | River Plate | 38 | 11 | 10 | 17 | 39 | 47 | −8 | 43 | |
| 16 | Gimnasia y Esgrima (LP) | 38 | 9 | 10 | 19 | 37 | 58 | −21 | 37 | |
| 17 | Huracán | 38 | 9 | 10 | 19 | 33 | 56 | −23 | 37 | |
| 18 | Atlético Tucumán | 38 | 7 | 14 | 17 | 38 | 58 | −20 | 35 | |
| 19 | Chacarita Juniors | 38 | 9 | 5 | 24 | 40 | 58 | −18 | 32 | |
| 20 | Tigre | 38 | 9 | 5 | 24 | 46 | 68 | −22 | 32 | |

Source: AFA
Rules for classification: 1st points; 2nd goal difference; 3rd goals scored; 4th head-to-head points; 5th head-to-head goal difference; 6th head-to-head goals scored

== See also ==
- 2009–10 in Argentine football
