= Marcelo Escudero =

Argentine footballer

Personal information
- Full name: Marcelo Alejandro Escudero
- Date of birth: 25 July 1972 (age 54)
- Place of birth: Punta Alta, Argentina
- Position: Midfielder

Team information
- Current team: River Plate (reserves manager)

Senior career*
Years	Team	Apps	(Gls)
1991–1992	Sporting Punta Alta		
1992–1996	Newell's Old Boys	90	(10)
1996–2002	River Plate	113	(12)
2003	Fortaleza	1	(0)
2004–2005	Olimpo	21	(2)

International career
1994–1995	Argentina	9	(1)

Managerial career
- 2012–2014: River Plate (assistant)
- 2016: Fénix
- 2020–2021: River Plate (youth)
- 2021: Newell's Old Boys (assistant)
- 2022: River Plate (youth)
- 2023–: River Plate (reserves)
- 2024: River Plate (interim)
- 2026: River Plate (interim)
- * Club domestic league appearances and goals

Marcelo Alejandro ''Pichi'' Escudero (born 25 July 1972) is an Argentine football manager and former player who played as a midfielder. He is the current manager of River Plate's reserve team.

== Career ==
Born in Punta Alta, Escudero started his career with Sporting Punta Alta in the South Bahia Blanca regional League of Argentine football. Shortly afterwards, he was transferred to Newell's Old Boys in 1992. He made his professional debut in the Argentine First Division with Newell's, where he was part of the squad that won the Clausura 1992 championship.

In 1995, Escudero was selected to join the Argentina squad for the Copa América in 1995.

In 1996, he joined River Plate, where he won five league championships, as well as the Copa Libertadores in 1996, and the Supercopa Sudamericana in 1997.

In 2003, he had an unsuccessful spell with Fortaleza in Brazil. His last club was Olimpo de Bahía Blanca, where he retired in 2005.

== Honours ==
Newell's Old Boys

- Argentine Primera División: Clausura 1992

River Plate

- Argentine Primera División: Apertura 1996, Clausura 1997, Apertura 1999, Clausura 2000, Clausura 2002
- Copa Libertadores: 1996
- Supercopa Sudamericana: 1997
- Intercontinental Cup runner-up: 1996
