= Mauro Laspada =

Argentine footballer and coach

Personal information
- Full name: Mauro Laspada
- Date of birth: 9 January 1975 (age 51)
- Place of birth: Punta Alta, Argentina
- Height: 1.92 m (6 ft 4 in)
- Position: Defender

Senior career*
Years	Team	Apps	(Gls)
1996–1997	Godoy Cruz		
1997–1998	Rafaela		
1998–1999	Juventud Antoniana		
1999–2000	Belgrano		
2000–2001	Tigre		
2001–2007	Olimpo	56	(10)
2006	Unión		
2007	Alvarado		
2008–2009	Punta Alta		
- * Club domestic league appearances and goals as of March 27, 2008

Mauro Laspada (born January 9, 1975, in Punta Alta) was an Argentine football defender who is currently the coach of Olimpo de Bahía Blanca.
