= Bajo Hondo =

- Town
- Location within Argentina
- Coordinates: 38°46′00″S 61°54′00″W
- Country: Argentina
- Province: Buenos Aires
- Partido: Coronel Rosales
- Founded: 1891

Government
  - Municipal Delegate: Jaime Ballester

Area
  - Total: 0.26 km^{2} (0.10 sq mi)
- Elevation: 80 m (260 ft)
- Area code: 02932
- Website: www.coronelrosales.gov.ar

Bajo Hondo is a town in the south of the Argentinean province of Buenos Aires located 22 kilometres (14 mi) from Punta Alta and 30 kilometres (19 mi) from Bahía Blanca. It lies along national highway N3 in Coronel Rosales Municipality.

== Population ==
Bajo Hondo has 164 inhabitants (INDEC,2010); in 2001 the population was 165.

== History ==
One of the founders of Bajo Hondo was a man from Belgium named Gustavo Coulembier. He bought land in Bajo Hondo in 1883 and established a farm which he named "La Sidonia".

The history of Bajo Hondo is similar to the neighbouring towns, all of which started as train stations that eventually attracted people to come and settle near them. These train stations, which later on turned into towns, were built by the Buenos Aires Great Southern Railway (BAGSR) a British company. The railway line was called "Ferrocarril del Sur", literally meaning "railway of the south".

The BAGSR opened the station of Bajo Hondo in 1891, hence the birth of the town. The name "Bajo Hondo" comes from the Spanish word "Bajo" meaning down, which the local people used to refer to the slope that exists shortly after where the train station was built.

In 1910 a French company known as COMPAGNIE DU CHEMIN DE FER DE ROSARIO A PUERTO BELGRANO built another Railway line running from Rosario, which was North of Buenos Aires, to Bahia Blanca, which was South of Buenos Aires. The new Railway line was called "Ferrocarril Rosario - Puerto Belgrano" This railway line too passed via Bajo Hondo and the company built a station just one kilometre away from the previous one.

In 1948 when the government of Argentina took over management of the two railway lines their names were changed to "Ferrocarril General Roca".

In the beginning of the 20th century the train was the main means of transport in the country, especially for transporting agricultural products to ports for export.

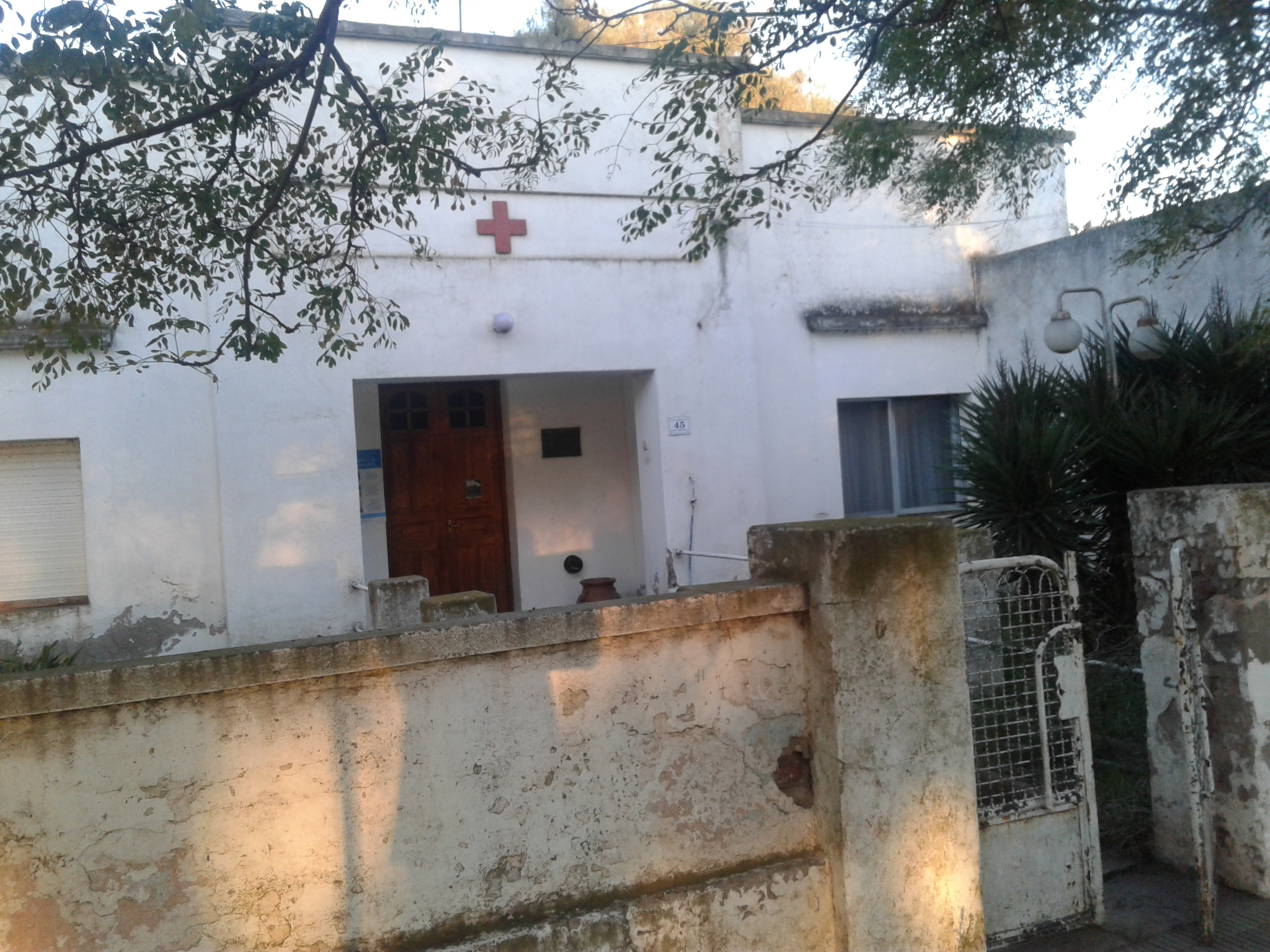
Bajo Hondo Health Centre

In the first decades of the 20th century, the population of Bajo hondo increased exponentially due to Agricultural activities as well as the presence of the two railway lines. The growth of the population automatically called for the establishment of public institutions and companies such as schools, hospitals, churches, post offices, police stations and others. It also led to the formation of co-operatives and social clubs.

== Bajo Hondo today ==
Factors that contributed to the depopulation of Bajo Hondo include:

- Industrialisation and mechanisation of agriculture which left many people unemployed.
- Lack of development policies for rural areas.
- The change in railway services from transporting passengers to only transporting cargo.

These factors led to people migrating to rural and urban locations in search for jobs.

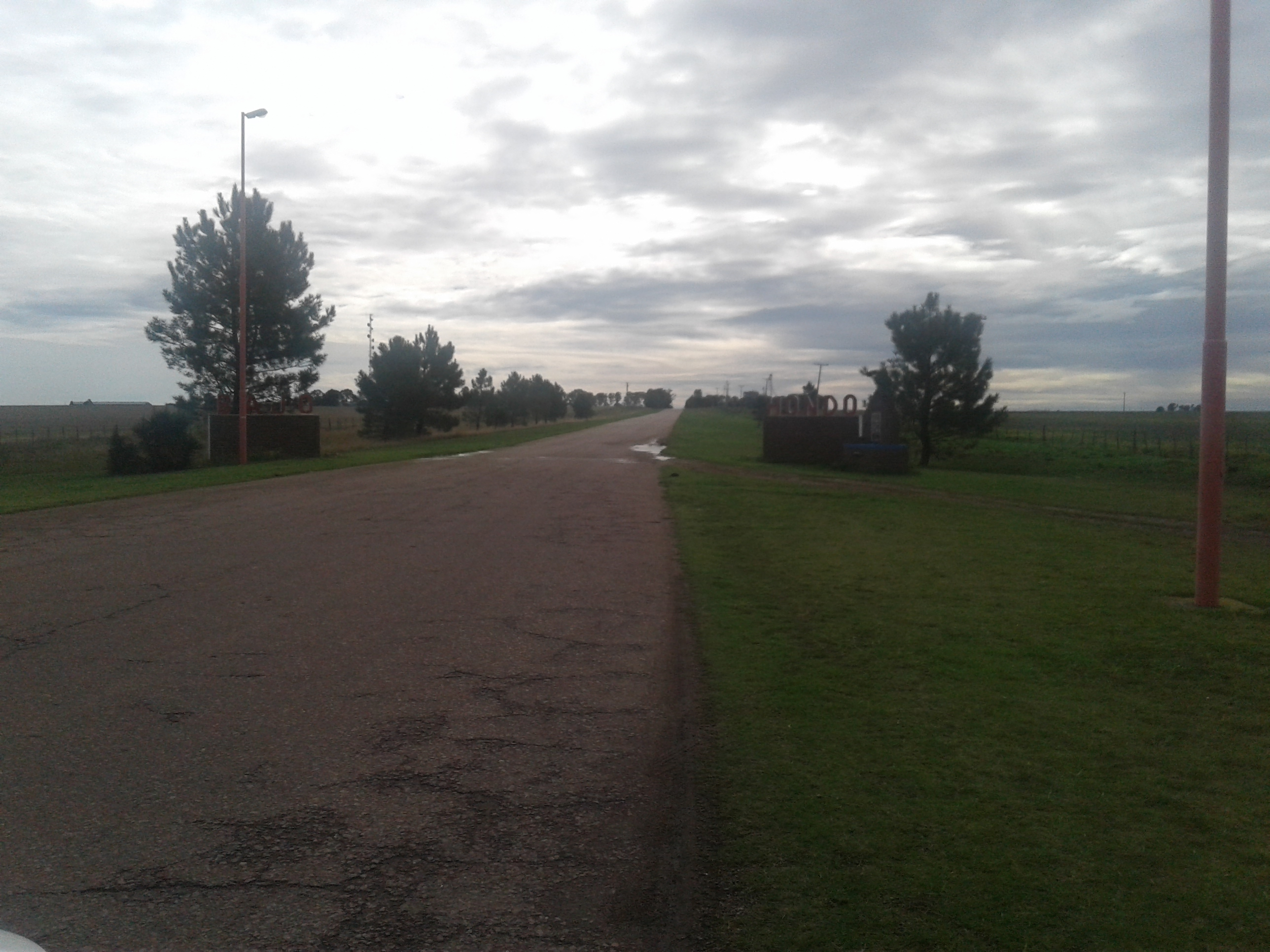
Town entry

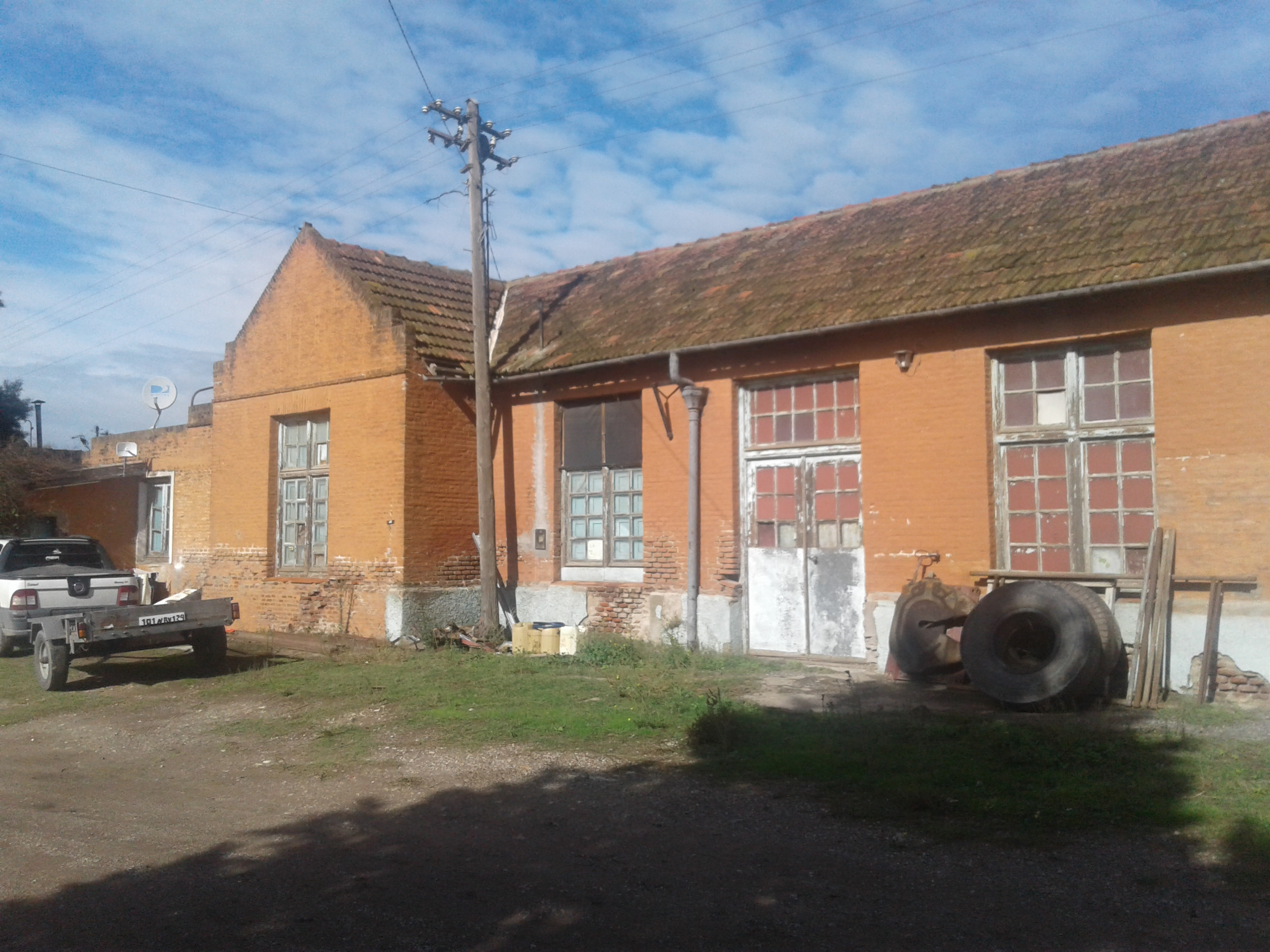
Bajo Hondo Train Station
