= Abel Julien Pagnard =

Abel Julien Pagnard (July 3, 1859 — November 16, 1913) was a French engineer and the architect of the commercial Port of Arroyo (now Puerto Rosales) near the city of Punta High in the south of Buenos Aires, Argentina.

Pagnard worked as an engineer for many years for Hersent. As an engineer for the company, he carried out improvements of the ports in Bordeaux and Antwerp. In 1902, he was sent by the company to Rosario, Argentina to assist with port renovations. In 1905, he resigned from Hersent and got a job with Argentina's Ministry of Public Works.

Pagnard proposed that a port be built near Arroyo Pareja. On 15 September 1908, a law was passed by the government (Law 1908 No. 5574) granting Pagnard the right to build and operate the port. He also contributed more broadly to the development of Rosario's waterfront.
