= Ariel Amaya =

Argentine footballer

Personal information
- Full name: Ariel Guillermo Amaya
- Place of birth: Buenos Aires, Argentina
- Position: Forward

Senior career*
Years	Team	Apps	(Gls)
1995–1996	Villa Mitre		
1996–1997	Deportivo Quito	5	(0)
1998–1999	Olimpo	7	(1)
1999	Everton		(7)
2000	Deportivo Pasto	5	(0)
2000–2001	Aldosivi		
2001–2002	UANL Tigres		
2003–2005	Victoria		
2005	Tiro Federal	–	(–)
2006–2007	Sporting Punta Alta	7	(0)
- * Club domestic league appearances and goals

Ariel Guillermo Amaya (born in Buenos Aires, Argentina) is a former Argentine footballer who played for clubs of Argentina, Chile, Mexico and Ecuador.

== Career ==
Besides Argentina, Amaya played for Deportivo Quito in Ecuador, Everton in Chile, Deportivo Pasto in Colombia, UANL Tigres in Mexico and Victoria in Honduras.

His last clubs were Tiro Federal and Sporting Punta Alta in his homeland.
