= Signia =

Signia can refer to more than one notable item:

- Signia (sportswear), an Argentine company.
- a MasterCard product issued by Coutts and Co
- Toyota Crown Signia, an automobile
- a colony of ancient Rome, in Latium adiectum, today Segni
- a Signage Software Suite, developed by Jake Bown
- a hearing aid brand, manufactured by WS Audiology
