= Coronel Rosales Partido =

Coronel Rosales Partido de Coronel Rosales
- Department
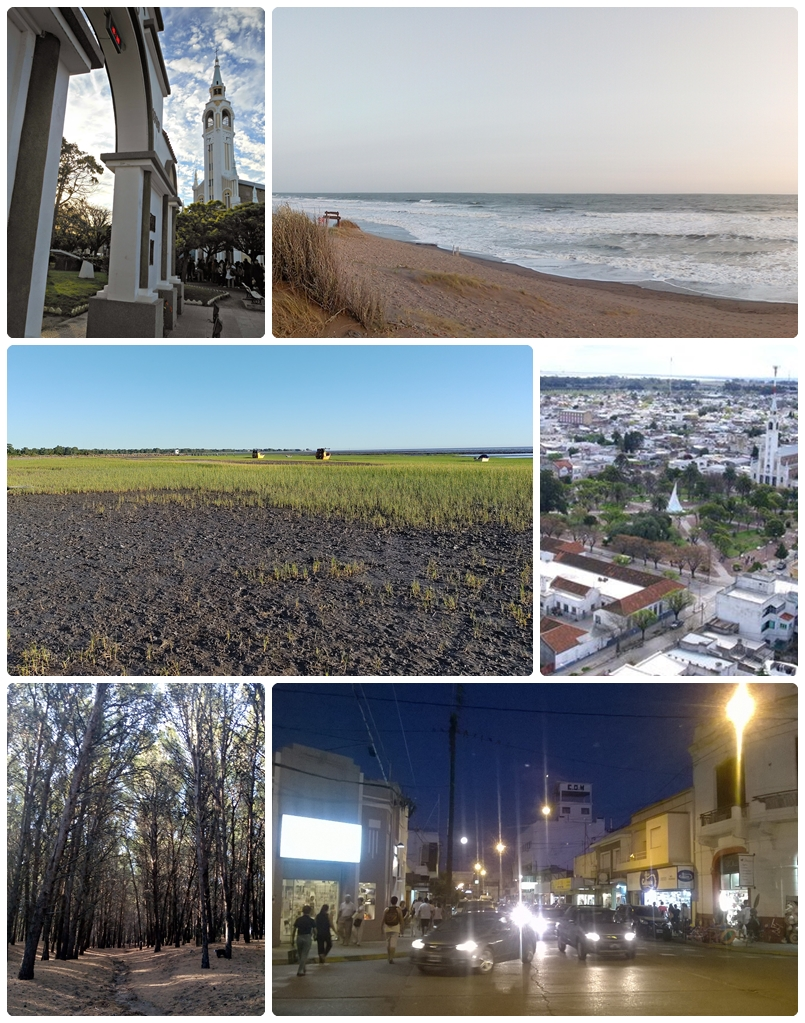

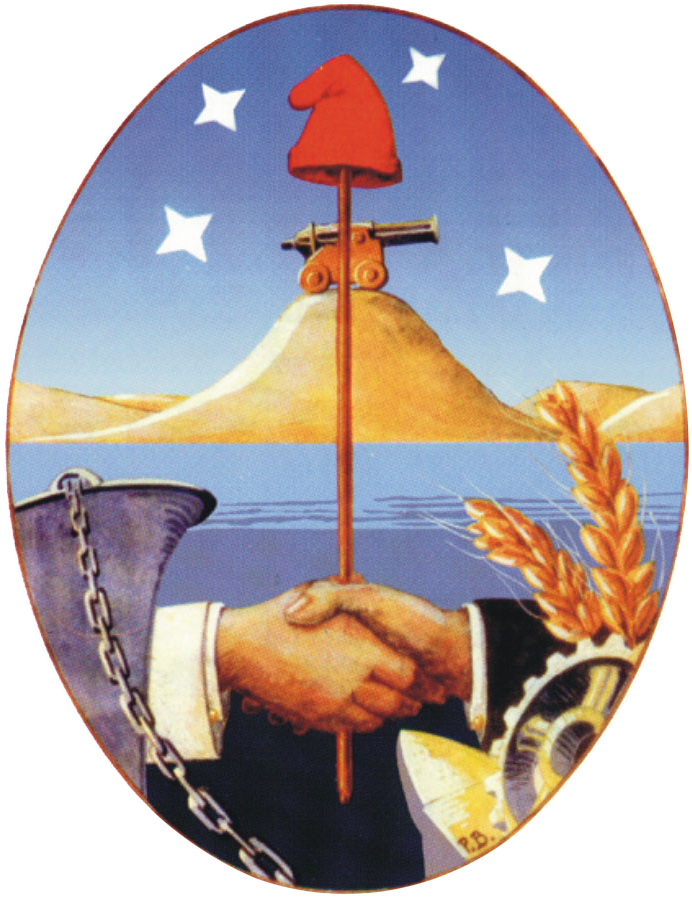
- Coat of arms

- location of Coronel Rosales Partido in Buenos Aires Province
- Coordinates: 38°52′S 62°05′W
- Country: Argentina
- Established: October 15, 1948
- Founder: provincial law
- Seat: Punta Alta

Government
  - Intendant: Rodrigo Aristimuño (Union for the Homeland)

Area
  - Total: 1,312 km^{2} (507 sq mi)

Population
  - Total: 60,892
  - Density: 46.41/km^{2} (120.2/sq mi)
- Demonym: rosaleño
- Postal Code: B8109
- IFAM: BUE029
- Area Code: 02932
- Website: https://mcr.gob.ar/

Coronel Rosales Partido is a partido on the southern coast of Buenos Aires Province in Argentina.

The provincial subdivision has a population of about 61,000 inhabitants in an area of 1,312 km^{2} (507 sq mi), and its capital city is Punta Alta, which is around 650 km (404 mi) from Buenos Aires.

== Attractions ==
The coastal village of Pehuen Có is popular with tourists from Provincia de Buenos Aires and it benefits from a beach, woodlands, a shipwreck, and fossils.

== Sport ==
The city of Punta Alta is home to Sporting Punta Alta, a football club that play in the regionalised 4th Division of Argentine football.

== Settlements ==
- Punta Alta, 57,296
- Bajo Hondo 165
- Calderón (Rosales)
- Paso Mayor
- Pehuen Có 674
- Villa del Mar, 353
- Villa General Arias, 1,777
