= Vulcabrasǀazaleia =

Vulcabrasǀazaleia S.A.
- Type: Sociedade Anônima
- Traded as: B3: VULC3
- Industry: Manufacturing
- Founded: 1952
- Headquarters: Jundiaí, Brazil
- Key people: Pedro Grendene Bartelle, (Chairman); Pedro Bartelle, (CEO)
- Products: Footwear; Canvas; Retail; Textile
- Revenue: ▼US$ 319.3 million (2018)
- Net income: ▼US$ 39.1 million (2018)
- Number of employees: 35,000
- Website: www.vulcabrasazaleia.com.br

Vulcabrasǀazaleia is a Brazilian footwear company, being the third largest in domestic market and in Latin America, only after Brazilians Alpargatas and Grendene. The company was founded in 1952 in São Paulo, but currently is headquartered in Jundiaí.

The company is owned by Grendene family, that owns Grendene, the second largest footwear company in Brazil and a competitor of Vulcabrasǀazaleia.

The company has 25 plants located in the Brazilian states of Ceará, Sergipe, Bahia, Rio Grande do Sul, and a plant in Argentina and has operations in Argentina, Chile, Uruguay, Colombia, Peru, India and United States.

Currently the company operates through its 6 brands that are azaleia, dijean, Olympikus, Opanka, Reebok and Botas Vulcabras.

== Brands ==
- azaleia – is a brand of women's shoes, is present in more than 17 000 retail outlets and in 44 countries. Is represented by Brazilian actress Grazi Massafera.
- dijean – is a brand with a focus on female teen market, has a sub-brand Dijean Neo, focused on adolescents.
- Olympikus – is the brand of footwear and sporting goods launched in 1975 with international sports brands, which are now sold in market at the same time. It is a sporting goods brands mostly used in Brazil.
- Opanka – is the brand of flip flop and slipper, this brand is a competitor of Havaianas a brand of Alpargatas and that is the largest manufacturer of flip flop in the world.
- Reebok – the company has an operational agreement with Reebok International, which enables it to develop, manufacture, import and distribute products from this brand, exclusively, in Brazil, Paraguay and Argentina.
- Botas Vulcabras is the brand of professional boot of rubber and PVC.
