= Signia (sportswear) =

Argentine sportswear brand

- Product type: Sportswear
- Current owner: GGM S.A.
- Produced by: Gatic S.A. (1999-2001)
- Country: Argentina
- Introduced: 1999; 27 years ago
- Markets: Argentina
- Previous owners: Torneos y Competencias; Gatic S.A. (1999–2001)

Signia is an Argentine sportswear brand which manufactures footwear and clothing. The brand has experienced some restructuring plans in the past due to financial problems, even disappearing from the market for some periods of time. Signia has also sponsored some Primera División football teams in Argentina, mostly at the beginning of the 2000s.

Established in 1999 from a partnership between media company Torneos y Competencias and textile manufacturer Gatic S.A., the brand was relaunched in 2011 after being acquired by GGM S.A., a company that also managed the Pony and Asics brands in Argentina.

Signia was official uniform provider of the Argentine Olympic Committee until 2023, when the committed signed a deal with French Le Coq Sportif.

== History ==
=== First years: TyC ===
The brand made its debut in 1999 as "TyC Signia". TyC was the acronym of Torneos y Competencias, an Argentine company created by Carlos Avila which had signed an agreement with the Argentine Football Association to be the exclusive broadcaster of all the Primera División football matches.

TyC expanded its business, creating a sportswear division due to its partnership with Gatic S.A., the Argentine textile manufacturing company founded in 1953 which had the exclusive license of international brands such as Adidas (since 1970), Le Coq Sportif, New Balance, Arena, Asics, LA Gear, and Umbro amongst others to produce and sell their products in the region. However, the incomes of the company had strongly decreased during the last years, due to the Argentine economic crisis.

TyC and Gatic signed an agreement with the objective of creating, developing and commercialising the "TyC Signia" brand, which was officially released in April 1999. Signia was conceived as an exclusive brand focused on high-performance products, in order to compete with other premium sports brands.

Despite being supported with massive advertisement campaigns, the sales of the TyC Signia products were poor, as well its repercussion as a new brand. This caused the first restructuring just one year later, when the brand was renamed simply as "Signia". Soon after, TyC signed its first agreements with some Primera División football teams, such as San Lorenzo de Almagro and Los Andes, which played its third run on Primera División wearing Signia equipment.

Signia designed some uniforms for San Lorenzo that were controversial, such as the black model (inspired by both, the nicknamed of the club, cuervo –raven– and the colour of father Lorenzo Massa's cassock), with a yellow sleeve to supposedly represent a raven peak. The model debuted in a match vs. River Plate, which would be the only time it was worn so the club recalled the jersey despite sales were good. Another model made by Signia for San Lorenzo was a silver kit, a rare jersey at the time, worn in the 2000 Copa Mercosur.

Although Gatic had the exclusive license to manufacture the Adidas products in Argentina, the German company had settled in the country during the 1990s, becoming Gatic's main rival. In 2002, Adidas decided to end its partnership with Gatic, after the Argentine subsidiary called to a creditor's meeting.

The 2001 Argentine economic collapse and the high price of the dollar stopped the entry of imported products (which had relegated the sporting goods manufactured in Argentina during the decade of the 1990s due to their lower costs) to the country. That situation encouraged Eduardo Bakchellian (the old owner of Gatic) to take Gatic over again in 2002. The company would be not a licensor but a manufacturer and provider of products for other brands such as Adidas (its former licensor) or Nike, which had arrived to Argentina a few years before.

=== Relaunching ===
Once the agreement with TyC concluded, Bakchellian searched for a new partner to relaunch Signia. The company finally signed an agreement with TV businessman Marcelo Tinelli, who had created a volleyball team in Bolivar, Buenos Aires Province (his home town). Therefore, the team was renamed "Bolívar Signia" with the company as its main sponsor and uniform manufacturer.

During its second era, Signia continued sponsoring San Lorenzo but also incorporated Arsenal de Sarandí, Huracán and Comisión de Actividades Infantiles to its list of endorsements. The most successful rugby union team of Argentina, Club Atlético San Isidro (mostly known as CASI) also signed with Signia.

In 2003, Signia signed a deal with the Argentine Football Association becoming the exclusive ball provider for all the Primera División matches. This agreement ended in 2004.

In September 2004, Gatic was finally declared bankruptcy and went into liquidation. The factory located in San Martín Partido was taken over by its former employees, being assisted by an international NGO. The other Gatic factories (the textile in Las Flores and the shoes manufacturer of Coronel Suárez) were rented by a recently created company, Indular Manufacturas S.A.

=== Third period ===
Indular Manufacturas kept the Signia brand, while the rest of former Gatic brands were dismissed or acquired by other companies. Signia had ceased sponsoring teams during the period of bankruptcy. Nevertheless, the company signed deals with more teams in 2006: Argentinos Juniors and Gimnasia y Esgrima de Jujuy. One year later Signia added Belgrano de Córdoba and Lanús to its list of teams sponsored.

In July 2007 Indular Manufacturas was acquired by Brazilian company Vulcabras, owner of Olympikus and part of the Grendene Group.

Soon after arriving to Argentina, Vulcabras (through its brand Olympikus) began its business in the region, taking over the teams sponsored by Signia at the time: Lanús (in 2009) and Argentinos Juniors (in 2010). As a result, Signia disappeared from the sports business for a while.

=== Fourth run: 2010–present ===
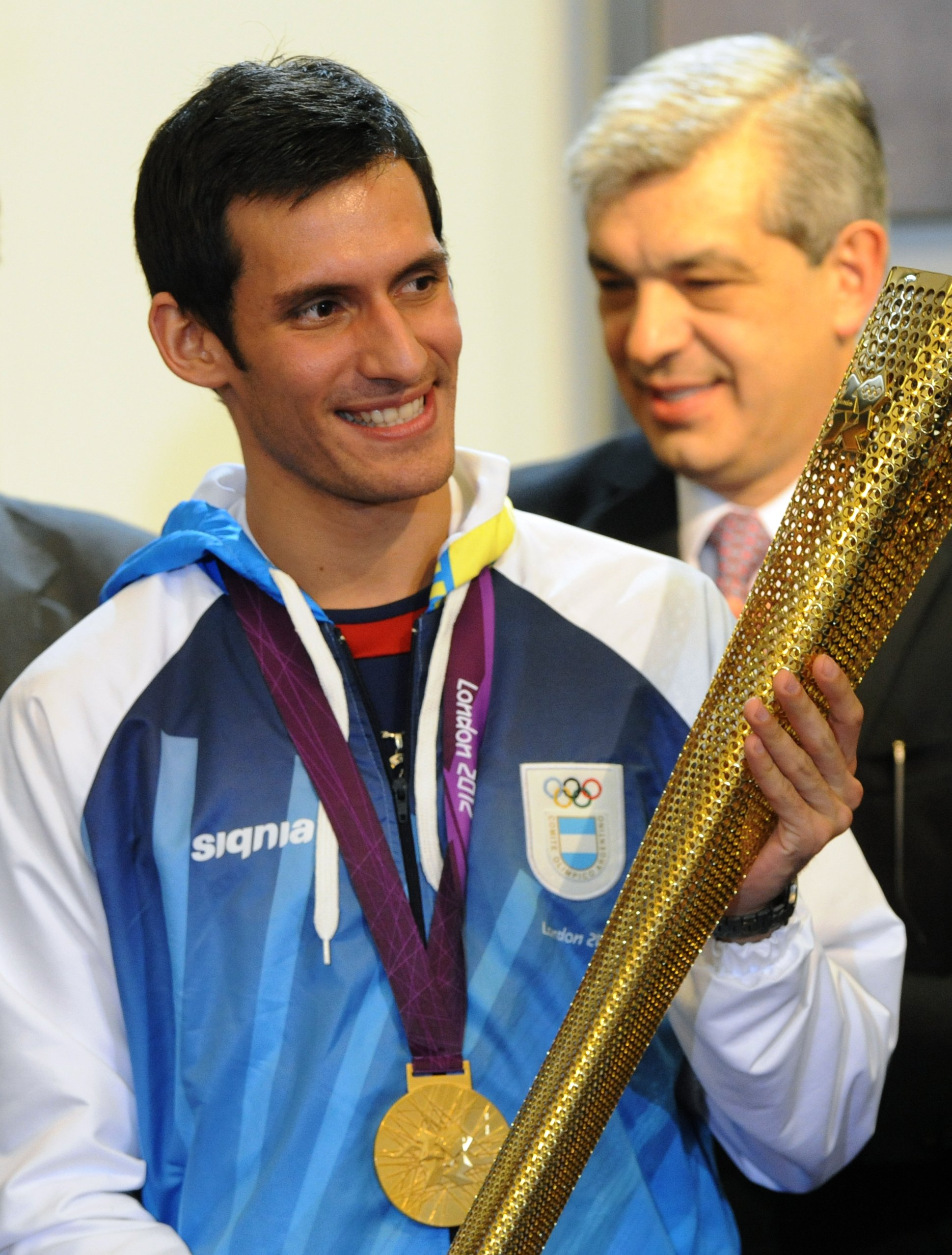
Taekwondo athlete Sebastián Crismanich wearing Signia official equipment, August 2012

In August 2010, Signia made a new appearance in the Argentine sports market, signing a deal with All Boys, which had promoted to Primera División that same year. The brand was relaunched by a new company called GGM S.A., which also obtained the license to manufacture and commercialize the Pony products in Argentina, Brazil, Uruguay and Paraguay.

Signia also signed an agreement with the Argentine Olympic Committee to provide equipment to its athletes during the Summer Olympics and Pan American Games. The brand made its debut during the 2011 Pan American Games held in Guadalajara.

The partnership ended in 2023 when the COA signed a deal with French company Le Coq Sportif as its exclusive uniforms provider.

== Former sponsorships ==
=== Football ===
- (Argentina) All Boys (2010–12, 2015–16)
- (Argentina) Arsenal de Sarandí (2002–03)
- (Argentina) Argentinos Juniors (2006–08)
- (Argentina) Ferro Carril Oeste (2017–18)
- (Argentina) Huracán (2002–03)
- (Argentina) San Lorenzo (2000–03)
- (Argentina) Los Andes (2000–01)
- (Argentina) Comis. Activ. Infantiles (2002–04)
- (Argentina) Gimnasia y Esgrima (J) (2006–08)
- (Argentina) Belgrano (C) (2006–08)
- (Argentina) Lanús (2007–09)
- (Argentina) AFA – Official ball (2003–04)

=== Olympic ===
- (Argentina) Argentine Olympic Committee (2011–23)

=== Rugby union ===
- (Argentina) C.A. San Isidro (2002–04)
- (Argentina) Newman
- (Argentina) Champagnat (2005–06)

=== Volleyball ===
- (Argentina) Bolívar (2002–03)

=== Basketball ===
- (Argentina) San Lorenzo (2014)

== Bibliography ==
- The story of Signia: Part 1, Part 2, Part 3, and Part 4 by Eugenio Palopoli on Arte y Sport website, April 16, to May 7, 2012 (links archived)
- El Error de ser Argentino by Eduardo Bakchellian, Galerna Editor, Argentina (2000) – ISBN 9505564090
