= Omar Asad =

Argentine footballer (born 1971)

Personal information
- Full name: Omar Andrés Asad
- Date of birth: 9 April 1971 (age 55)
- Place of birth: Buenos Aires, Argentina
- Height: 1.77 m (5 ft 10 in)
- Position: Forward

Senior career*
Years	Team	Apps	(Gls)
1992–2000	Vélez Sársfield	108	(23)

International career
1995	Argentina	2	(0)

Managerial career
- 2003–2009: Vélez Sársfield (youth)
- 2010: Godoy Cruz
- 2011: Emelec
- 2011: San Lorenzo
- 2012: Godoy Cruz
- 2013: Atlas
- 2016–2017: Sportivo Estudiantes
- 2020: San José
- 2020: Always Ready
- 2021: Always Ready
- 2025: El Nacional
- 2025: Godoy Cruz
- * Club domestic league appearances and goals

Omar Andrés Asad (born 9 April 1971) is an Argentine football manager and former player who played as a forward.

As a player, Asad spent all of his career in Vélez Sársfield, winning 8 titles with the club (including both the Copa Libertadores and the Intercontinental Cup).

Asad is nicknamed el Turco (in English: "the Turk") because he has Syrian and Lebanese ethnicity. In Argentina, Arabs are usually mistakenly called Turks since they came to the country with Ottoman Turkish documents in the 1900s.

== Playing career ==
Asad played as a striker and was characterised by being strong and quick. His first match in the Argentine Primera División came in 1992, when he played for Vélez Sársfield against Talleres de Córdoba.

He was a determinant player in Vélez' most successful years, along manager Carlos Bianchi and Paraguayan goalkeeper José Luis Chilavert. With Vélez, Asad won the Argentine Primera División title in 1993 (Clausura), and after that the Copa Libertadores and the Intercontinental Cup, where he was chosen Man of the Match after scoring the second goal against A.C. Milan. Asad later won the Apertura in 1995 and played for the Argentina national team, until he got injured in the end of that season, which stopped his progression as a player.

== Coaching career ==
On 2 January 2010, Godoy Cruz hired Asad as coach to replace Enzo Trossero. The former forward had coaching experience with Vélez' youth divisions and reserve team. During his first season with Godoy Cruz (2010 Clausura), Asad led the team to a surprising 3rd-place finish; and led them to a 5th place the following championship (2010 Apertura). Due to the good league finishes, Godoy Cruz qualified for the 2011 Copa Libertadores; however, the coach did not renew his contract with the team, citing economical reasons.

On 23 December 2010, Ecuadorian team Emelec confirmed the signing of Omar Asad to manahadthe team for the 2011 season.

On 11 May 2011, Argentine team San Lorenzo signed with him to take the manager position from 20 June 2011.

On 10 June 2013, he was presented as the new coach for Mexican side Atlas. Asad had pressure on him due to the fact that former coach Tomas Boy took the team to the liguilla with a total of 32 points which gave Atlas an advantage in the relegation fight. Asad team debuted in a 3–3 draw against Club Tijuana, coming back from a 3–1 partial lost, with 2 goals from Vicente Matías Vuoso and Edson Rivera scored the equalizer. After 13 games Asad was fired in Atlas after a 2–1 defeat against Cruz Azul. In 13 games Asad managed nil wins, eight draws and five losses. His worst results with Atlas were both in away games a 3–0 defeat against Club America and another 3–0 defeat against Chiapas F.C.

== Personal life ==
Omar is nephew of Julio Asad, a former Vélez player of the 1960s and 1970s. His son Yamil Asad is a professional footballer in the USA with MLS side FC Cincinnati.

== Honours ==
Vélez Sársfield

- Argentine Primera División: 1993 Clausura, 1995 Apertura, 1996 Clausura, 1998 Clausura
- Copa Libertadores: 1994
- Intercontinental Cup: 1994
- Copa Interamericana: 1996
- Recopa Sudamericana: 1997
- Supercopa Sudamericana: 1996

Individual

- Intercontinental Cup Man of the Match: 1994

== See also ==
- List of one club men
