= Rubén Ramírez (footballer, born 1982) =

Argentine footballer

Personal information
- Full name: Rubén Darío Ramírez
- Date of birth: October 17, 1982 (age 44)
- Place of birth: Santa Fe, Argentina
- Height: 1.85 m (6 ft 1 in)
- Position: Striker

Team information
- Current team: Huracán de Vera

Youth career
- Colón

Senior career*
Years	Team	Apps	(Gls)
2003–2009	Colón	100	(32)
2004–2005	→ Tiro Federal (loan)	34	(18)
2009	→ Racing Club (loan)	24	(3)
2010	Banfield	39	(16)
2011–2012	Godoy Cruz	40	(25)
2012–2013	Colón	34	(6)
2014	Audax Italiano	12	(2)
2014	Audax Italiano B	2	(0)
2014	Godoy Cruz	18	(7)
2015	Quilmes	16	(5)
2016	Temperley	8	(0)
2017	Guillermo Brown	17	(3)
2017–2018	Huracán Las Heras	16	(1)
2018	Dock Sud	3	(0)
2019	Deportivo Bañado	6	(2)
2022–2023	Germinal Rawson	16	(4)
2024–	Huracán de Vera	–	(–)
- * Club domestic league appearances and goals as of 10 December 2024

Rubén Darío Ramírez (born 17 October 1982 in Margarita, Santa Fe) is an Argentine football striker who plays for Huracán FC de Vera.

== Career ==
Ramírez started playing in the youth team of Colón. He was loaned to Tiro Federal for the 2004–2005 season, returning to Colón in 2005. He has established himself as a regular member of the first team squad.

In February 2009, he joined Racing Club but after less than a year he moved on to join Club Atlético Banfield.

Ramírez scored his first goal in Banfield with a goal in a 3–0 win versus Argentinos Juniors on 24 February 2010. Two further goals followed in a 3–1 win over Colón de Santa Fe, one of Ramirez former clubs, on 4 March 2010. Two more important goals came in a home match against Gimnasia y Esgrima de la Plata on 27 March 2010, after Gimnasia had taken the lead and missed a penalty, Ramírez scored twice in the second half to help Banfield win 3–2. On 21 April 2010, Ruben added two more headed goals to his Copa Libertadores season in a 4–1 home win over Deportivo Cuenca.

On 14 May 2010, Ruben scored the third goal in a 3–0 win over Boca Juniors. He was the top scorer of 2011 Apertura, with 12 goals.

On 31 July 2012, he signed for Colón de Santa Fe for second time in his career.

In 2014, Ramírez had his only experience abroad with Audax Italiano in the Chilean Primera División. He also made two appearances for the B-team in the Segunda División Profesional.

In 2024, Ramírez joined Huracán Fútbol Club de Vera.
