= Héctor Rivoira =

Argentine footballer and manager (1960–2019)

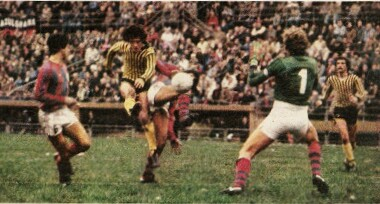

Personal information
- Full name: Héctor Oscar Rivoira
- Date of birth: April 10, 1960
- Place of birth: Ituzaingó, Argentina
- Date of death: August 14, 2019 (aged 59)
- Position: Midfielder

Youth career
- River Plate

Senior career*
Years	Team	Apps	(Gls)
1981–1984	Almirante Brown	155	(?)
1985–1987	Deportivo Italia		
1987–1989	Lanús		
1989–1991	Defensores de Belgrano		
1991–1992	Ituzaingó		

Managerial career
- 1992–1994: Ituzaingó
- 1995: Almirante Brown
- 1995–1996: Nueva Chicago
- 1997: Deportivo Italia
- 1997–2000: Chacarita Juniors
- 2000–2001: Quilmes
- 2002–2003: LDU Quito
- 2003–2004: Instituto
- 2004–2005: Ferro Carril Oeste
- 2005–2007: Chacarita Juniors
- 2007: Instituto
- 2008–2009: Atlético Tucumán
- 2009–2010: Huracán
- 2010–2011: Rosario Central
- 2011: Chacarita Juniors
- 2011–2012: Olimpo de Bahía Blanca
- 2012: Huracán
- 2013–2014: Almirante Brown
- 2014–2015: Atlético Tucumán
- 2015–2016: Instituto
- 2016–2018: Crucero del Norte
- * Club domestic league appearances and goals as of 21:18, 3 December 2009 (UTC)

Héctor Oscar Rivoira (10 April 1960 – 14 August 2019) was an Argentine football manager and player who worked as the manager of Atlético Tucumán.

== Playing career ==
Rivoira played for the River Plate youth teams but never played for the first team. In 1981, he joined Almirante Brown where he played a total of 155 games. He then joined Deportivo Italia where he had a brief stint as a Primera División player during the 1986-87 season. Later in his career he played for Club Atlético Lanús and Defensores de Belgrano before playing out his career with local side Club Atlético Ituzaingó.

== Managerial career ==
Rivoira was given the job as manager of Club Atlético Ituzaingó in 1992. He also managed a number of other teams in the 2nd division (Primera B Nacional) teams in the 1990s. In 1999 his Chacarita Juniors team was promoted to the Primera Division after a 2nd-place finish. He managed the team for the full Apertura 1999 tournament but was sacked four games into Clausura 2000.

After a season with Quilmes Rivoira travelled to Ecuador to become manager of LDU Quito.

In 2003, he returned to Argentina and became manager of Instituto de Córdoba and led them to the Primera B Nacional championship and earned a team promotion to the Primera División for the 2nd time. Following this promotion he was sacked only 9 games into the Primera División season.

He returned to the 2nd tier managing Ferro Carril Oeste and Chacarita Juniors before returning to instituto in 2007.

In 2008, he took over as manager of newly promoted Atlético Tucumán and led them to the 2008-09 Primera B Nacional championship, his 2nd championship and third promotion at this level. After a poor start to the Primera División season he resigned after 12 games of the Apertura. In December 2009 he was unveiled as the new manager of Club Atlético Huracán, his first appointment as manager of an established Primera División club.

On August 14, 2019, he died at age 59 after struggling for a year with colon cancer.

== Titles as a manager ==
Season	Team	Title
2003-04	Instituto de Córdoba	Primera B Nacional
2008-09	Atlético Tucumán	Primera B Nacional
