= Olympikus =

Brazilian sports equipment company

- Type: Subsidiary
- Industry: Sporting goods
- Founded: 1975; 51 years ago
- Headquarters: Jundiaí, Brazil
- Area served: South America
- Products: Athletic shoes, clothing
- Parent: Vulcabras Azaleia
- Website: olympikus.com.br

Olympikus is a Brazilian sports brand, which makes sports equipment for running and fitness. The brand is owned by Vulcabras Azaleia.

Current products by Olympikus include athletic shoes and apparel. In the past, the company also sponsored several volleyball and football teams.

== History ==
Olympikus was established in 1975, releasing its first series of athletic shoes made of leather (one of the first in the country). Shortly thereafter, international sports brands began to enter Brazil and Olympikus began to compete in the technological, advertising and marketing fields for space with these companies.

In the 1990s the brand became a sponsor of various athletes and entities. Olympikus signed agreements with Claudinei Quirino, Gustavo Borges, Vanderlei Cordeiro, Maureen Maggi, Gustavo Kuerten, Giba, Bernardinho and Bárbara Leôncio among others. In addition, Olympikus started a partnership with the Brazilian Volleyball Confederation (1997), the Brazilian Athletics Confederation (1999) and the Brazilian Olympic Committee (1999).

The brand entered to football market in 2009, signining deals with Flamengo and Cruzeiro. Olympikus also expanded to Argentina, serving as exclusive kit provider of clubs Racing, Lanús, Argentinos Juniors and Rosario Central.

In 2007 Olympikus was chosen as one of the official sponsors of the Pan American Games held in Rio de Janeiro. The brand not only sponsored the event, but the Brazilian delegation.

== Sponsorships ==
The following list that are or have been sponsored by Olympikus:

=== Olympic Committees ===
- Brazil (1999–2011)

=== Athleticism ===
==== Associations ====
- Brazil (1999–2011)

==== Athletes ====
- (Brazil) Maurren Maggi (2000–04)
- (Brazil) Claudinei da Silva (2000–04)
- (Brazil) Bárbara Leôncio

=== Association football ===
==== Association ====
- (Brazil) Rockgol

==== Clubs teams ====
- (Argentina) Argentinos Juniors (2010–13)
- (Argentina) Lanús (2009–2013)
- (Argentina) Racing (2010–13)
- (Argentina) Rosario Central (2012–14)
- (Brazil) Cruzeiro (2012–14)
- (Brazil) Grêmio (1980–82)
- (Brazil) Flamengo (2009–2012)
- (Brazil) Internacional (1984–86)

=== Basketball ===
==== Club teams ====
- (Brazil) Flamengo (2008-2012)

=== Volleyball ===
==== Association ====
- (Brazil) CBV (1997–2016)

==== National teams ====
- Argentina (2008–2015)
- Brazil (2000–16)

==== Club teams ====
- (Argentina) Bolívar
- (Brazil) Campinas (1996–99)
- (Brazil) Olympikus Telesp (1994–99)
- (Brazil) Finasa Osasco (2009–2012)
- (Brazil) Sesc Flamengo (2008–2012)

==== Athletes ====
- (Brazil) Bruno Rezende (2009–present)
- (Brazil) Fabiana Alvim (2009–2012)
- (Brazil) Giba (1997–2014)
- (Brazil) Murilo Endres
- (Brazil) Paula Pequeno (2009-2012)

=== Swimming ===
==== Athletes ====
- (Brazil) Gustavo Borges (2000)

=== Rugby ===
==== Club teams ====
- (Argentina) Liceo Naval (2009–2017)

=== Tennis ===
==== Athletes ====
- (Brazil) Gustavo Kuerten (2002–03)
