= Motomel =

Argentine motorcycle brand

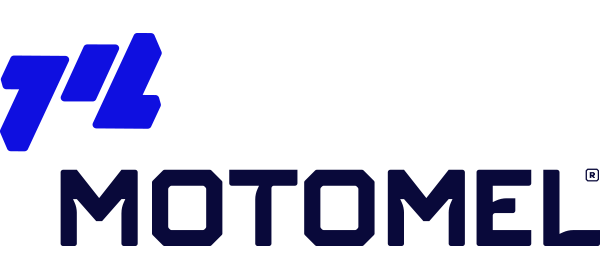
- Type: Private
- Industry: Motorcycle
- Founded: 1992
- Headquarters: San Nicolás, Buenos Aires, Argentina
- Products: Motorcycles; ATVs; Scooters
- Number of employees: 750
- Website: MotoMel.com.ar

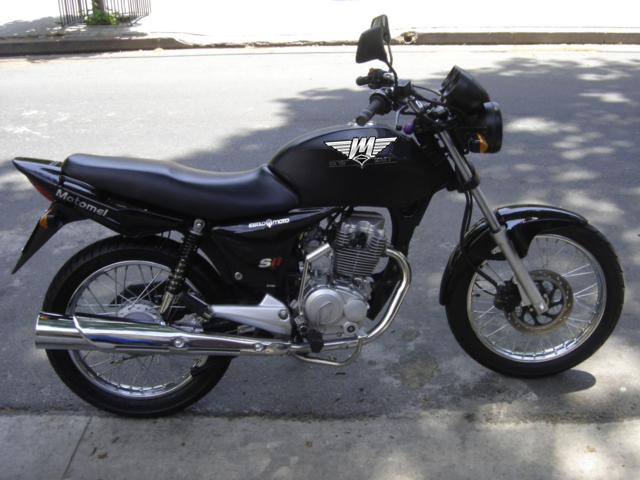
Motomel CG 150 Serie 2 motorcycle.

Motomel S.A. is a brand of Argentine motorcycle, based in Buenos Aires Province; founded in 1992 by the La Emilia investment group.

== History ==
The La Emilia factory has its origins in 1892. Two brothers established the first textile factory in Argentina located in the outskirts of Buenos Aires, in La Emilia. As the company grew in the Argentine market, it started to manufacture other products within its facilities. In 1992 the La Emilia factory changed course and began to assemble Suzuki motorcycles under the name of Motomel.

== Motomel today ==
As of 2017, Motomel is the largest company importing motorcycles in Argentina and these motorcycles are also being re exported to some other countries in South America. Motomel assembles almost 150,000 motorcycles per year.
