= Sporting Punta Alta =

Argentine football club

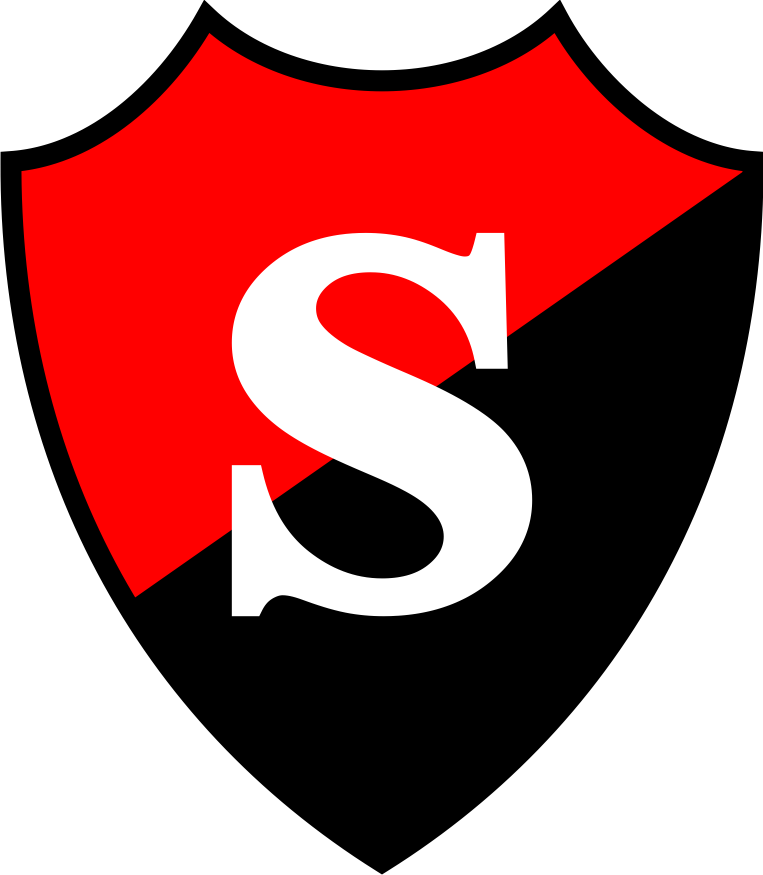
- Full name: Club Atlético Sporting
- Nicknames: Rojinegros; Los Negros
- Founded: February 25, 1925
- Ground: Estadio Enrique Mendizabal, Punta Alta; Buenos Aires Province, Argentina
- Capacity: 12.000
- League: Liga del Sur (Bahía Blanca)
- 2007–08: 5th Zone E
Home colours	Away colours

Club Atlético Sporting are an Argentine Football club, their home town is Punta Alta, in the Coronel Rosales Partido of Buenos Aires Province in Argentina. They played in Argentino B until 2009 when they resigned from the league.
