= Punta Alta =

City in Buenos Aires Province, Argentina

- City
- Montage of Punta Alta

- Location in Argentina
- Coordinates: 38°52′48″S 62°04′30″W
- Country: Argentina
- Province: Buenos Aires
- Partido: Coronel Rosales
- Founded: 2 July 1898
- Elevation: 2 m (6.6 ft)

Population (2010 census [INDEC])
  - Total: 58,315
- CPA Base: B 8109
- Area code: +54 2932
- Website: Official website

Punta Alta is a city in Argentina, about 25 kilometers southeast of Bahía Blanca. It has a population of 57,293. It is the capital ("cabecera") of the Coronel Rosales Partido. It was founded on 2 July 1898.

The city is located near the Atlantic Ocean, neighbouring the Port Belgrano Naval Base, which is home to the Argentine Naval fleet. The activities revolve around the Puerto Belgrano Naval Base, the largest of Argentina. In it, in addition to tasks related to the strict military services are developed to provide Sea Fleet Navy Argentina and work for others, standing naval activity in the dry docks. However, in the early twentieth century, tended to diversify the economy. Punta Alta was the seat of important investments especially from France. In 1903 a railway was concessioned to connect the port of Rosario to Punta Alta, which is already projected a grain shipping terminal. He trained in Paris the Compagnie du Chemin de Fer de Rosario Puerto Belgrano (Railroad Company Rosario Puerto Belgrano), with the participation of large lenders, including Bank Paribas. The railway line was inaugurated in December 1910. With French capital began to build a commercial port at the mouth of the Arroyo couple (2 km from the city center), called to be the largest grain port in South America. Designed by Mr. Abel Julien Pagnard, the works began in early 1912. But after World War froze construction and enabled only part of the picture projected. It was nationalized in December 1947 by the first government of Perón and Puerto Rosales called him, in memory of the eponymous naval hero of the match. Today the revival of the port along with the launch of the free zone-Colonel Bahía Blanca Rosales is a certain hope of the city's economic takeoff. Also noteworthy is that Punta Alta is proud to be the city where he founded the first Electric Cooperative Argentina (1927), which still operates providing electric power to the district. Local Electric Cooperative has electricity turbines, which are the Centennial Wind Farm, one of the most important in the country.

== Demographics ==
In the census 1980 it was listed with 56,620 inhabitants. For the 1991 census there was a mild decline to 56,427 residents and 57,296 inhabitants (INDEC, 2001) 0.2 Population growth is stagnating in the negative until 1991. With the 2001 census was perceived a slight improvement, but it would continue in the next census. The 2010 census showed an increase of only 1% of the population, counting 31,400 women and 30,200 men.

== History ==
Punta Alta welcomed residents of all provinces along its history, who settled on a base population consisting mostly of European immigrants (mainly Italians and also a large number of Spanish and European north and east). An example of this phenomenon of immigration as are the more than 8,000 Jujuy and Salta former residents currently living in this city and many more from other provinces, mainly in northern Argentina. Such ethnic diversity is one of the cultural riches of Punta Alta, where residents coexist provincial centers, in addition to Spanish and Italian companies. The human development indices are good. The illiteracy rate is only 0.68%. The 85.85% of the population lives in houses of strong materials and solid, with all the insulation and finish and only 0.59% live in homes built with materials or solid waste. 81% of households have access to the sewer. Is estimated at 15.8% of population with unsatisfied basic needs.

=== Indigenous Inhabitants ===
When the national government promoted in the late nineteenth century, the construction of the military port, the White Bay area and promptly fields next to what is now Punta Alta and Puerto Belgrano Naval Base were occupied mostly by two aboriginal groups in peaceful coexistence with a few white settlers.

Were Linares and Ancalao, belonging, according to J. O. Sulé, two different ethnic biases. The first were of Pehuenche or guenaken or mestizo, while the others were boroga descent. The latter, led by cacique Coñhuepán Venancio, had arrived in the area around 1827, accompanied by Colonel Ramon Estomba as auxiliary forces in the founding of the Fort Protective Argentina (now city of Bahía Blanca), settling in the vicinity of the present village Romana, near the cemetery and Napostá Arroyo. From the beginning, along with Linares, were considered "friendly Indians", settling permanently within the boundary, as already stated, and militarily aiding the regular garrison of the fort.

The implementation of the "modus vivendi" between whites and Indians was due to several factors. For the Strength Protection Argentina, long distances to other towns and irregular communication and transportation, made friendly coexistence and trade with the Indians was of vital importance for the maintenance of the fort. We must also consider the indigenous ethnic relations, where the Araucanians, established in the Andes and foothills, constantly pressuring groups established in the pampas of Argentina to join their attacks on farms and forts. But these, in territories bordering on the border, were the hardest hit occurs when a retaliation by the white settler, so they were likely to establish a peaceful relationship in order to ward off the attacks of the Araucanians and ensure turn, trade in goods with Christians. Thus, the Ancalao and Linares, as "Indian friends" of Bahia Blanca, contributed their guys went both strong defense in punitive actions, highlighting those carried out in 1857 against the people of Calfucurá that grouped Indigenous Confederation in Pampa, threatened them permanently. At that time, General José Martínez Zapiola, War Minister of State of Buenos Aires, organized a force called "Operation Southern Army" composed of two divisions. The first was for the Fort Independence (Tandil today) and the second to Fortress Protective Argentina, forming part of the cacique Ancalao Francisco, with its 46 guys went to fight. In February 1858 the army camped on the headwaters of the stream Pigüé. Not far away, downstream, Calfucurá readied their spears 1500. The fighting lasted for two days, and after a fierce close combat, hostile indigenous forces ceded. It was the first time Calfucurá was defeated. His reaction to such humiliation was immediate. On the morning of May 9, 1859 three thousand spearmen, under the orders of Calfucurá, Catricurá, Antemil and Cañumil, attacked the fort of Bahia Blanca, breaking into a runaway gallop by current and Zelarrayán Estomba streets toward the plaza. They gave him the strength to fight the Indians auxiliary forces under the command of Francisco Ancalao, along with the Italian Military Legion and numerous armed civilians. When the sun rose there was no trace of the invaders, pursued by stronger forces were scattered throughout the desert. That unfortunate event could have been avoided and that days before had alerted Francisco Ancalao his boss, Lt. Col. Olegario Orquera, on the insistent questions about the flashy and loud by some Indian traders from the Salinas Grandes, although this is not listened. However, their performance during strong defense earned him the appointment of Sergeant Major for the Superior Government of Buenos Aires, on January 21, 1860. Ten years later, the hosts of Calfucurá again attacked Bahía Blanca, herding, in late August 1870, a thousand head of cattle that grazed in what is now Patagonia and Roman village park. Alerted, the garrison commander Lt. Col. Jose Llano alongside some armed neighbors Francisco Ancalao Lancers, the height reached the hamlet of Arroyo couple, near Punta Alta, thwarting the assault and recovering the estates. Before the attempted robbery, Calfucurá planned a new attack, entrusting his son Namuncurá. Under the plan devised, the town of Bahia Blanca would be looted by about 2,000 Indians, led by Manuel Suarez deserter. But at the last moment, when people already skirted the Arroyo Namuncurá Napostá, Suárez regretted his action and warned of the impending invasion Ancalao Francisco, who quickly informed of the danger to the Commander Jose Llano. The trumpet and cannon fire called action stations and convinced Namuncurá abort the plan, for the loud and would not be an easy target. Again, Ancalao Francisco, as commander in chief of the Indian Auxiliary Force Fortress, stood out in the performance of their duties. Finally, in January 1871 he died, leaving a service record filled with acts of heroism in the service of civilization, leading his people in scores of battles. In recognition, his remains were buried in the village cemetery, in a Christian land, located in the present place Enrique Pellegrini of Bahia Blanca. however, provoked the reaction of the parish priest, who demanded Dr. Sixto Laspiur, President of the Municipality, the immediate burial of the remains as they otherwise would be declared to the cemetery desecrated. Given this delicate situation, the matter was submitted to a third party, officiating as such the Head of the South Coast Division, Lieutenant Colonel Domingo Viejobueno, who ordered that the remains had been buried where he remained, with the honors due to his military hierarchy.

After the death of that cacique, people Ancalao Rafael remained in command of his son. A few years remained near Bahia Blanca, because according to J. Plubins Guardiola, in the early 80s were eradicated bahiense ejido, citing health reasons since the outbreak of typhus unleashed by that time. Were established, then, in the fields next to City Atlantis and Arroyo couple, in a "sort of stay" that had been given to Francisco Ancalao in October 1866, while Linares, under the command of Don Fernando, did own in the places next to the current defense batteries. There they remained until they started construction of Puerto Militar, when they were evicted without hesitation. In 1910 Rafael Ancalao was reported that, along with its people, should vacate the nearly 5000 acres belonging to him as the Government of the Province of Buenos Aires had sold the Raggio Miguel Carneiro. Thus on 4 May 1912 began the exodus of these people, with their families, working cattle and implements, heading Baggins in the province of Black River, where he lived Ancalao Simeon, Rafael nephew, who had been agree with the Governor of that province provisional granting some land to settle. However, a member of that group remained in the lands he considered his. Fermín González Ancalao was then known simply as "the Indian Fermin". He was born in Tres Arroyos, about 1873, the son of Hermenegildo González and Petrona Ancalao, this daughter of Francisco Rafael Ancalao and sister. Very probably, in 1900 or before Fermin occupied lands now known as "island Cantarelli", until in 1916 he began working at the Naval Base as a laborer Workshops Division and moved to town. He left in charge of his possessions to a certain Viola, who remained there until 1938, when it was evicted by a court order such lands have been sold to Mr. Marcio Canarelli circa 1926. Since then Fermin tried by all means to reconquer their property by addressing a letter to the President of the country himself General Edelmiro Farrell. Other documents that had to prove their possession was a letter from the engineer A. Nieburth, Diks company, Dates & Van Hattem, builder of Puerto Militar, who had been responsible for the layout of the Strategic Railway line called, between Punta Alta and batteries. In that document, the engineer pointed out that during the task had used voluntary aid only occupant of the field, the Indian Fermin, and had even set a landmark for orientation of his staff named FERMIN, seated with the toponymy at the officers. However, despite those statements and documents submitted, Fermin did not recover their possessions. He spent his life working in the factories of the Naval Base until he retired in 1941. "I'm the first Indian Base retired," said Fermin proud, whose only privilege had been able to enter the naval complex horse. Already blind old man, died on May 18, 1959. The Indian Fermin remained forever in the memory of puntaltenses, especially those who knew him, as Mabel Leon, who rescued these memories: The fine was the scrape of samba and even voice had almost equally finite sang her little voice and melodious. It was very emotional, not at all shy and had integrated perfectly white. Not so his father who died fighting to defend their land and refusing to be part of this civilization. I remember the Indian Fermin completely short, very crooked, high cheekbones and wearing round glasses and a small. He always wore a hat very old, and with his guitar arratonado shoulder riding ran everywhere in Punta Alta, which at the time was not yet paved. He lived over a hundred years, although he could not say exactly because they possessed documentation. Completely blind, many years nursed a lady with whom he married in a ceremony attended by many people who are glad of heart for this event. The Indian Fermín is a mythical character of Punta Alta, unknown to many and valued by all who knew him. It had its own history of raids and battles in defense of the place that he could legitimately claim to be the illegitimate son of this land.

=== Irigoyen city of Punta Alta ===
Regarding Linares, the other Indians settled in the area, progress was also away from his natural possession of the land to the far corners. Mariano Linares, son of Fernando Linares, entered the campus staff Bahía Blanca Commune in 1910, serving as serene and caretaker of the square. After 25 years of service, in March 1936 he retired to die just a month later, at age 80.

== Sports ==
The most practiced sports are football and basketball. But it is also possible to practice other sports such as swimming, karate, tennis and horse riding (in the Ponderosa and Puerto Belgrano), fishing, volleyball, rugby, hockey, motocross, speedway, midget, karting, athletics, bocce and besides the COM (Circle Officers Mar) is practiva bowling.

=== Football clubs ===
Punta Alta has two professional football clubs, members of the Southern League (BB):

- Club Rosario Puerto Belgrano, the club is currently participating in the second division of the Southern League.
- Club Atletico Sporting, Punta Alta Club participating in the tournament official Southern League. It is the only club that has ever fallen to such promotional league tournament.
- Club Atlético M&M.
- Was reactivated Pehuen-Co Social Club in the nearby town of the same name, engaged professionally in the Football League Coronel Dorrego.
- It also has two municipal land where free practice sports sepueden desired. The sports center of Rio Dulce Street "54", has a Football 5 activity on Saturdays, which hosts tournaments since 2006 to promote health to the men's over 18 years.

=== Basketball clubs ===
- Club Comandante Espora
- Club Deportivo y Social Altense
- Ateneo Club
- Club Atlético Los Andes from Punta Alta
- Club Atlético Carlos Pellegrini

=== Rugby and Hockey clubs ===
- Puerto Belgrano Rugby and Hockey
- Punta Alta Rugby Club
- Sporting
- Rosario Puerto Belgrano
- M & M Hockey club.

== Museums and related ==
- Museum of Natural Sciences "Charles Darwin"
- Historical Museum
- Puerto Belgrano Naval Museum
- Municipal Archives
