= List of Argentine Primera División transfers (2008–09 season) =

This is a list of football transfers involving teams from the Argentine Primera División for the 2008–09 season.

== July–August (winter) transfer window ==
=== Argentinos Juniors ===
In

- (Argentina) Matías Córdoba from (United States) Real Salt Lake (loan return)
- (Argentina) Mauro Bogado from (Argentina) Instituto (loan return)
- (Argentina) Mariano Martínez from (Argentina) Olimpo
- (Argentina) Rodrigo Díaz & (Argentina) Juan Ramón Fernández from (Argentina) Colón
- (Argentina) Nicolás Pavlovich from (Argentina) Banfield (loan)
- (Paraguay) Carlos Recalde from (Argentina) San Martín de San Juan
- (Argentina) Franco Quiroga from (Argentina) Nueva Chicago

Out

- (Argentina) Pablo Barzola to (France) Caen
- (Argentina) Roberto Battión & (Argentina) Alejandro Delorte to (Greece) Aris F.C.
- (Uruguay) Álvaro Pereira to (Romania) CFR Cluj
- (Argentina) Nicolás Gianni (loan) & (Chile) Milovan Mirosevic to (Chile) Universidad Católica
- (Argentina) Lionel Coudannes (loan) & (Argentina) Ariel Seltzer to (Argentina) Independiente Rivadavia
- (Argentina) Bruno Urribarri to (Greece) Asteras Tripolis
- (Argentina) Sebastián Brunet (released)

=== Arsenal de Sarandí ===
In

- (Argentina) Facundo Coria & (Argentina) Sergio Sena from (Argentina) Vélez Sársfield (loan)
- (Argentina) Daniel Carou from (Argentina) Cipolletti
- (Argentina) Facundo Sava from (Argentina) Racing
- (Argentina) Mauro Matos from (Argentina) Deportivo Armenio
- (Guatemala) José Manuel Contreras from (Guatemala) Comunicaciones (loan)
- (Argentina) Cristian Campestrini from (Argentina) Almirante Brown
- (Argentina) Matías Alasia from (Argentina) Tiro Federal
- (Argentina) Matías Carabajal from (Argentina) Ferro

Out

- (Argentina) José Luis Calderón to (Argentina) Estudiantes de La Plata
- (Argentina) Pablo Garnier to (Argentina) Colón de Santa Fe
- (Argentina) Martín Andrizzi to (Ecuador) Deportivo Quito
- (Argentina) Martín Civit to (Costa Rica) LD Alajuelense
- (Argentina) Alexander Corro to (Argentina) Atlanta (end of loan)
- (Argentina) Leonardo Biagini (released)
- (Argentina) Carlos Ruiz (retired)

=== Banfield ===
In

- (Argentina) Guillermo Esteban from (Argentina) Belgrano (loan return)
- (Argentina) Gastón Schmidt from (Argentina) Quilmes (loan return)
- (Argentina) Enrique Bologna from (Peru) Alianza Lima (loan return)
- (Argentina) Víctor López from (Spain) Real Sociedad
- (Argentina) Marcelo Bustamante & (Argentina) Maximiliano Bustos from (Argentina) Vélez Sársfield
- (Argentina) Santiago Raymonda from (Mexico) CD Veracruz
- (Argentina) Walter Ervitti from (Mexico) CF Monterrey
- (Argentina) Nicolás Bertolo from (Uruguay) Nacional
- (Uruguay) Sebastián Fernández from (Uruguay) Defensor Sporting (loan)
- (Argentina) Federico Nieto from (Argentina) Huracán
- (Argentina) Cristian Nasuti from (Argentina) River Plate
- (Argentina) Claudio Ortiz from (Morocco) Wydad Casablanca
- (Argentina) Francisco Paravano from (Argentina) Atlético Rafaela

Out

- (Argentina) (Croatia) Darío Cvitanich to (Netherlands) Ajax
- (Argentina) Javier Villarreal to (Paraguay) Cerro Porteño
- (Colombia) Jairo Patiño to (Mexico) San Luis Potosí
- (Argentina) Nicolás Pavlovich to (Argentina) Argentinos Juniors
- (Argentina) Daniel Quinteros to (Cyprus) Apollon Limassol
- (Argentina) Pablo Santillo to (Ecuador) Barcelona SC
- (Argentina) Sergio Esteche to (Argentina) Aldosivi
- (Argentina) Gabriel Longo to (Argentina) Racing de Trelew
- (Argentina) Mauricio Pedano to (Italy) F.C. Matera
- (Argentina) Diego Herner to (Argentina) Huracán
- (Argentina) Javier Sanguinetti (retired)

=== Boca Juniors ===
In

- (Argentina) José María Calvo from (Spain) Recreativo Huelva (loan return)
- (Argentina) Juan Krupoviesa from (France) Olympique de Marseille (loan return)
- (Argentina) Julio Barroso from (Argentina) Estudiantes LP (loan return)
- (Argentina) Damián Díaz from (Argentina) Rosario Central
- (Argentina) Luciano Figueroa from (Italy) Genoa C.F.C. (loan)

Out

- (Argentina) Luis Ibáñez to (Croatia) Dinamo Zagreb
- (Argentina) Pablo Ledesma to (Italy) Catania
- (Argentina) Sebastián Nayar to (Spain) Recreativo Huelva
- (Argentina) Mauro Boselli to (Argentina) Estudiantes LP
- (Argentina) Sebastián Alberto Battaglia to (Venezuela) UA Maracaibo (loan)
- (Argentina) Pablo Migliore to (Argentina) Racing (loan)
- (Argentina) Fabián Monzón to (Spain) Real Betis
- (Argentina) Jonathan Maidana to (Ukraine) FC Metalist Kharkiv

=== Colón de Santa Fe ===
In

- (Argentina) Sebastián Sciorilli from (Argentina) River Plate (loan)
- (Argentina) Pablo Garnier from (Argentina) Arsenal
- (Argentina) Nicolás Torres from (Argentina) Tigre
- (Argentina) Diego Pozo from (Argentina) Instituto
- (Paraguay) Salustiano Candia from (Mexico) Veracruz
- (Paraguay) Robert Franco from (Paraguay) 2 de Mayo
- (Argentina) Diego Crosa from (Israel) Maccabi Haifa F.C.
- (Argentina) Lucas Valdemarín from (Sweden) AIK
- (Argentina) Matías Oyola from (Argentina) Independiente (loan)
- (Argentina) Pablo Rodríguez from (Argentina) El Porvenir

Out

- (Argentina) Rodrigo Díaz & (Argentina) Juan Ramón Fernández to (Argentina) Argentinos Juniors
- (Argentina) Darío Gandín to (Argentina) Independiente
- (Argentina) Hugo Iriarte to (Argentina) Gimnasia LP
- (Argentina) Alcides Píccoli to (Paraguay) Cerro Porteño
- (Argentina) Pablo Jerez to (Argentina) Tigre (loan)
- (Argentina) Juan José Morales to (Argentina) Quilmes
- (Venezuela) César González to (Argentina) Huracán
- (Argentina) Laureano Tombolini to (Argentina) Instituto
- (Argentina) Hernán Encina to (Argentina) Godoy Cruz
- (Argentina) Diego Reynoso to (Argentina) Atlético Tucumán
- (Argentina) Andrés Bailo to (Argentina) Sportivo Belgrano (loan)
- (Argentina) Claudio Enría (released)

=== Estudiantes de La Plata ===
In

- (Argentina) José Luis Calderón from (Argentina) Arsenal de Sarandí
- (Argentina) Gastón Fernández from (Mexico) UANL Tigres (loan)
- (Argentina) Mariano Barbosa from (Spain) Recreativo Huelva
- (Argentina) Mauro Boselli from (Argentina) Boca Juniors
- (Argentina) Matías Sánchez from (Argentina) Racing
- (Argentina) Maximiliano Núñez from (Argentina) Temperley (loan return)

Out

- (Argentina) Julio Barroso to (Argentina) Boca Juniors (end of loan)
- (Argentina) José Basanta to (Mexico) CF Monterrey
- (Argentina) Pablo Piatti to (Spain) UD Almería
- (Argentina) Ezequiel Maggiolo to (Mexico) C.F. Ciudad Juárez (loan)
- (Argentina) Leonardo Sánchez to (Argentina) San Martín de San Juan (loan)
- (Paraguay) Édgar González to (Paraguay) Olimpia
- (Argentina) Gonzalo Saucedo to (Argentina) Godoy Cruz (loan)
- (Argentina) Leandro Lázzaro to (Argentina) Tigre
- (Argentina) Maximiliano Badell to (Argentina) Platense (loan)
- (Argentina) Ezequiel Brítez to (Mexico) Deportivo Irapuato
- (Argentina) Pablo Lugüercio to (Argentina) Racing
- (Argentina) Marcos Pirchio to (Argentina) Olimpo (loan)
- (Argentina) Lucas Wilchez to (Argentina) Talleres

=== Gimnasia y Esgrima La Plata ===
In

- (Argentina) Roberto Sosa from (Italy) S.S.C. Napoli
- (Argentina) Ariel Agüero from (Argentina) San Martín de San Juan
- (Argentina) Mariano Messera from (Argentina) Rosario Central
- (Argentina) Gastón Sessa from (Ecuador) Barcelona SC
- (Argentina) René Lima from (Israel) Maccabi Haifa F.C.
- (Argentina) Hugo Iriarte from (Argentina) Colón de Santa Fe
- (Argentina) Sebastián Romero from (Greece) Panathinaikos
- (Argentina) Esteban González from (Spain) UD Las Palmas
- (Paraguay) Rubén Maldonado from (Italy) Chievo Verona
- (Argentina) Franco Niell from (United States) D.C. United
- (Argentina) Patricio Graff from (Spain) Hércules CF
- (Argentina) Denis Stracqualursi from (Argentina) Unión de Sunchales
- (Argentina) Martín Ortiz from (Argentina) San Martín de San Juan
- (Argentina) Sergio Valenti from (Argentina) Ben Hur

Out

- (Argentina) Renato Civelli to (France) Olympique de Marseille (end of loan)
- (Argentina) Matías Escobar to (Turkey) Kayserispor
- (Argentina) Santiago Gentiletti to (Chile) Provincial Osorno
- (Argentina) Antonio Piergüidi to (Argentina) Quilmes (loan)
- (Chile) Luis Ignacio Quinteros to (Mexico) Lobos de la BUAP
- (Argentina) Ignacio Oroná to (Argentina) Villa San Carlos
- (Argentina) Mauricio Yedro to (Argentina) Defensa y Justicia
- (Argentina) Elvio Friedrich to (Argentina) Los Andes
- (Argentina) Roberto Salvatierra to (Argentina) Olimpo
- (Uruguay) Sergio Leal to (Uruguay) Danubio F.C.
- (Argentina) Federico Domínguez to (Cyprus) Apollon Limassol

=== Gimnasia y Esgrima de Jujuy ===
In

- (Argentina) Walter Busse from (Peru) Atlético Minero (loan return)
- (Argentina) David Ramírez from (Argentina) Godoy Cruz
- (Argentina) Gastón Pezzuti from (Argentina) Atlético Rafaela
- (Argentina) Ariel Franco from (Argentina) San Martín de San Juan
- (Chile) Sebastián Rocco from (Chile) Audax Italiano (loan from Necaxa)
- (Argentina) Ariel Montenegro from (Spain) Hércules CF
- (Argentina) Pablo Calandria from (Spain) Albacete
- (Argentina) Claudio Fileppi from (Argentina) Racing
- (Argentina) Mauricio Ferradas from (Ecuador) Deportivo Cuenca
- (Argentina) Juan Lapietra from (Argentina) Independiente (loan)

Out

- (Argentina) Juan Manuel Herbella to (Venezuela) UA Maracaibo
- (Argentina) Mario Turdó, (Argentina) Marcelo Quinteros & (Argentina) Facundo Pérez Castro to (Argentina) San Martín de Tucumán
- (Argentina) José Valdiviezo to (Argentina) Atlético Tucumán
- (Argentina) Eric Schmil to (Argentina) Belgrano
- (Argentina) Mauricio Almada to (Argentina) Quilmes
- (Argentina) Luis Miguel Escalada to (Argentina) Newell's Old Boys (end of loan from L.D.U. de Quito)
- (Argentina) Matías Miramontes to (Italy) A.C. Ancona
- (Argentina) Gustavo Coronel to (Argentina) Talleres de Perico
- (Argentina) Nicolás Armella to (Argentina) Gimnasia y Tiro de Salta
- (Argentina) Miguel Ángel Gutiérrez to (Argentina) Juventud Antoniana
- (Argentina) Luciano De Bruno and (Argentina) Gabriel Ruiz (released)

=== Godoy Cruz ===
In

- (Argentina) Marcos Ramírez from (Argentina) Independiente (loan)
- (Colombia) Jairo Castillo from (Uruguay) Defensor Sporting
- (Argentina) Jonathan Schunke from (Argentina) Almagro
- (Argentina) Iván Borghello from (Argentina) Talleres
- (Argentina) Leonardo Sigali from (Argentina) Lanús
- (Argentina) Gonzalo Saucedo from (Argentina) Estudiantes LP
- (Argentina) Jorge Carranza from (Argentina) Instituto
- (Argentina) Víctor Figueroa from (Argentina) Chacarita Juniors
- (Honduras) Wilmer Crisanto from (Honduras) CD Victoria (loan)
- (Argentina) Hernán Encina from (Argentina) Colón
- (Paraguay) Víctor Ferreira from (Paraguay) Cerro Porteño
- (Argentina) Lautaro Formica from (Argentina) San Lorenzo

Out

- (Argentina) Julio Moreyra to (Argentina) Instituto (end of loan)
- (Argentina) David Ramírez to (Argentina) Gimnasia de Jujuy
- (Argentina) Gabriel González to (Argentina) Atlético Tucumán
- (Argentina) Enzo Cappa to (Argentina) Deportivo Maipú
- (Argentina) Gerardo Solana to (Argentina) San Martín de Tucumán
- (Argentina) Matías Cuello to (Argentina) Racing de Córdoba
- (Paraguay) Luis Ovelar to (Paraguay) Cerro Porteño PF
- (Argentina) David Fernández to (Argentina) Tigre
- (Uruguay) Jorge Curbelo to (Uruguay) Defensor Sporting

=== Huracán ===
In

- (Argentina) Ariel Cólzera from (Argentina) Atlético Rafaela
- (Argentina) Carlos Casartelli from (Mexico) C.F. Ciudad Juárez
- (Argentina) Alejandro Limia from (Spain) Cádiz CF
- (Argentina) Gastón Esmerado from (Greece) Skoda Xanthi
- (Argentina) Sergio Meza Sánchez from (Argentina) Almirante Brown
- (Argentina) Carlos Araujo from (Argentina) Olimpo
- (Argentina) Matías Manrique from (Uruguay) Peñarol
- (Argentina) Germán Castillo from (Ecuador) Deportivo Cuenca
- (Argentina) Lucas Calviño from (Argentina) Almagro
- (Argentina) Fernando Pagés from (Indonesia) Persiraja Banda Aceh
- (Argentina) Matías Gigli from (Argentina) Belgrano
- (Venezuela) César González from (Argentina) Colón de Santa Fe
- (Argentina) Hernán Barcos from (Serbia) Red Star Belgrade (loan from Racing)
- (Argentina) Gastón Beraldi from (Argentina) Platense
- (Argentina) Diego Herner from (Argentina) Banfield
- (Colombia) David González from (Turkey) Çaykur Rizespor

Out

- (Argentina) Cristian Sánchez Prette to (Romania) CFR Cluj
- (Argentina) Eduardo Domínguez to (United States) Los Angeles Galaxy
- (Argentina) Damián Nieto to (Argentina) Almagro
- (Argentina) Marcelo Barovero to (Argentina) Vélez Sársfield
- (Argentina) Franco Mendoza to (Paraguay) Olimpia
- (Argentina) Ángel Puertas to (Argentina) Independiente
- (Argentina) Claudio Guerra to (Argentina) Unión (loan)
- (Argentina) Walter Coyette to (Argentina) Chacarita Juniors
- (Argentina) Andrés Franzoia to (Argentina) Rosario Central (end of loan from Boca Juniors)
- (Argentina) Omar Zarif to (Argentina) Rosario Central
- (Argentina) Federico Nieto to (Argentina) Banfield
- (Japan) Yusuke Kato to (Argentina) Defensores de Belgrano (loan)
- (Argentina) Federico Poggi to (France) AC Ajaccio
- (Argentina) Germán Lanaro to (Argentina) Guillermo Brown
- (Argentina) Francisco Maciel & (Argentina) Antonio Barijho (released)

=== Independiente ===
In

- (Argentina) Leonel Ríos from (Argentina) Vélez Sársfield
- (Argentina) Emanuel Centurión from (Mexico) Atlas (loan)
- (Argentina) Federico Higuaín from (Mexico) América
- (Argentina) Darío Gandín from (Argentina) Colón
- (Argentina) Ángel Puertas from (Argentina) Huracán
- (Argentina) Leonel Núñez from (Greece) Olympiacos
- (Argentina) Leandro Depetris from (Italy) Brescia
- (Argentina) Hilario Navarro from (Argentina) Racing

Out

- (Argentina) Germán Denis to (Italy) S.S.C. Napoli
- (Argentina) Marcos Ramírez to (Argentina) Godoy Cruz (loan)
- (Argentina) Emiliano Rébora to (Argentina) Estudiantes BA (loan)
- (Argentina) Hernán Pérez to (Argentina) Almagro (loan)
- (Argentina) Gastón Machín to (Argentina) Newell's Old Boys (loan)
- (Argentina) Matías Oyola to (Argentina) Colón (loan)
- (Argentina) Enzo Bruno to (Argentina) San Martín de Tucumán (loan)
- (Argentina) Juan Lapietra to (Argentina) Gimnasia de Jujuy (loan)
- (Argentina) Pablo Vitti to (Ukraine) FC Chornomorets Odesa (loan)
- (Argentina) Sebastián Carrizo to (Argentina) Olimpo
- (Argentina) Carlos Matheu to (Italy) Cagliari

=== Lanús ===
In

- (Argentina) Hernán Grana from (Argentina) All Boys
- (Argentina) Gustavo Balvorín from (Argentina) Vélez Sársfield

Out

- (Argentina) Lautaro Acosta to (Spain) Sevilla FC
- (Argentina) Nelson Benítez to (Portugal) FC Porto
- (Argentina) Leonardo Sigali to (Argentina) Godoy Cruz
- (Argentina) Rodrigo Acosta to (Spain) Sevilla Atlético
- (Uruguay) Claudio Flores to (Uruguay) Tacuarembó F.C.
- (Argentina) Agustín Pelletieri to (Greece) AEK Athens (loan)

=== Newell's Old Boys ===
In

- (Argentina) Germán Caffa from (Argentina) San Martín de Tucumán
- (Argentina) Juan Manuel Insaurralde from (Argentina) Chacarita Juniors
- (Paraguay) Diego Barreto (loan return), (Paraguay) Ernesto Cristaldo & (Paraguay) Walter Fretes from (Paraguay) Cerro Porteño
- (Argentina) Pablo Monsalvo from (Sweden) AIK
- (Argentina) Sebastián Grazzini from (Italy) Sestrese
- (Argentina) Gastón Machín from (Argentina) Independiente (loan)
- (Argentina) Cristian Fabbiani from (Romania) CFR Cluj
- (Argentina) Sebastián Peratta from (Argentina) Vélez Sársfield
- (Argentina) Leandro Armani & (Argentina) Iván Pillud from (Argentina) Tiro Federal (loan)
- (Argentina) Luis Miguel Escalada from (Argentina) Gimnasia de Jujuy (loan from L.D.U. de Quito)
- (Argentina) Gustavo Pinto from (Argentina) Olimpo
- (Argentina) Marcos Flores from (Argentina) Unión (loan return)
- (Argentina) Emanuel Lazzarini from (Argentina) Temperley (loan return)
- (Argentina) Marcelo Penta from (Argentina) Chacarita Juniors (loan return)

Out

- (Paraguay) Justo Villar to (Spain) Real Valladolid
- (Argentina) Cristian Llama to (Italy) Catania (end of loan)
- (Argentina) Martín Seri to (Argentina) San Martín de San Juan (loan)
- (Argentina) Nicolás Cabrera to (Argentina) Vélez Sársfield
- (Argentina) Marcos Gutiérrez to (Argentina) San Martín de Tucumán
- (Argentina) Adrián Lucero to (Argentina) Racing
- (Paraguay) Santiago Salcedo to (Argentina) River Plate
- (Argentina) Pablo Vázquez to (Argentina) Nueva Chicago
- (Argentina) Miguel Ángel Torren to (Paraguay) Cerro Porteño (loan)
- (Argentina) Juan Manuel Sosa to (Argentina) Almirante Brown
- (Argentina) Augusto Mainguyague to (Bolivia) Bolívar

=== Racing Club ===
In

- (Argentina) Martín Wagner & (Argentina) Leandro González from (Argentina) Olimpo
- (Argentina) Adrián Lucero from (Argentina) Newell's Old Boys
- (Argentina) Pablo Lugüercio from (Argentina) Estudiantes LP
- (Argentina) Franco Peppino from (Mexico) Veracruz
- (Argentina) Lucas Aveldaño from (Argentina) Atlético Rafaela
- (Argentina) Pablo Migliore from (Argentina) Boca Juniors (loan)

Out

- (Argentina) Diego Manicero to (Argentina) Belgrano (end of loan from Lanús)
- (Argentina) Facundo Sava to (Argentina) Arsenal
- (Argentina) Bernardo Leyenda to (Argentina) San Martín de Tucumán
- (Argentina) Claudio Fileppi to (Argentina) Gimnasia de Jujuy
- (Argentina) Maximiliano Estévez & (Paraguay) Erwin Ávalos to (Paraguay) Cerro Porteño
- (Argentina) Matías Sánchez to (Argentina) Estudiantes LP
- (Chile) Reinaldo Navia to (Ecuador) LDU Quito
- (Argentina) Adrián Bastía to (Greece) Asteras Tripolis
- (Argentina) Santiago Malano & (Argentina) Diego Menghi to (Argentina) Atlético Rafaela
- (Argentina) Hilario Navarro to (Argentina) Independiente
- (Paraguay) Roberto Bonet (released)

=== River Plate ===
In

- (Argentina) Diego Barrado from (Argentina) Olimpo (loan return)
- (Uruguay) Robert Flores from (Uruguay) River Plate de Montevideo (loan from Villarreal CF)
- (Argentina) Martín Galmarini from (Argentina) Tigre
- (Argentina) Facundo Quiroga from (Germany) VfL Wolfsburg
- (Paraguay) Santiago Salcedo from (Argentina) Newell's Old Boys
- (Uruguay) Sebastián Abreu from (Israel) Beitar Jerusalem (only for the Copa Sudamericana

Out

- (Argentina) Juan Pablo Carrizo to (Italy) S.S. Lazio (end of loan)
- (Chile) Alexis to (Italy) Udinese (end of loan)
- (Uruguay) Sebastián Abreu to (Israel) Beitar Jerusalem
- (Argentina) Hernán Lillo to (Argentina) Almagro (loan)
- (Argentina) Maximiliano Oliva to (Argentina) Tigre (loan)
- (Argentina) Diego Cardozo to (Argentina) Instituto (loan)
- (Argentina) Nicolás Domingo to (Italy) Genoa (loan)
- (Argentina) Lucas Sánchez & (Argentina) Lucas Malacarne to (United States) FC Dallas (loan)
- (Argentina) Ariel Ortega & (Haiti) Judelin Aveska to (Argentina) Independiente Rivadavia (loan)
- (Argentina) Federico Almerares to (Switzerland) FC Basel
- (Argentina) Cristian Nasuti to (Argentina) Banfield
- (Argentina) Sebastián Sciorilli to (Argentina) Colón (loan)
- (Argentina) Matías Díaz to (Argentina) San Martín de San Juan (loan)
- (Argentina) Horacio Ameli (retired)

=== Rosario Central ===
In

- (Argentina) Ezequiel González from (Greece) Panathinaikos
- (Paraguay) Jorge Núñez from (Paraguay) Cerro Porteño
- (Argentina) Andrés Franzoia & (Argentina) Omar Zarif from (Argentina) Huracán
- (Uruguay) Ignacio Ithurralde from (Argentina) Olimpo (loan from CF Monterrey)

Out

- (Argentina) Cristian Álvarez to (Spain) Espanyol
- (Argentina) Tomás Costa to (Portugal) FC Porto
- (Argentina) Mariano Messera to (Argentina) Gimnasia de La Plata
- (Argentina) Emiliano Papa to (Argentina) Vélez Sársfield (end of loan)
- (Colombia) Martín Arzuaga to (Colombia) Junior
- (Bolivia) Ronald Raldes to (Saudi Arabia) Al-Hilal
- (Argentina) Germán Medina to (Argentina) Tiro Federal
- (Argentina) Ramiro Fassi to (Argentina) Quilmes
- (Argentina) Eduardo Farías to (Argentina) Almagro
- (Argentina) Andrés Imperiale to (Argentina) San Martín de Tucumán (loan)
- (Uruguay) Federico Martínez to (Chile) Deportes Antofagasta
- (Uruguay) Maximiliano Pérez to (Uruguay) Defensor Sporting Club
- (Argentina) Damián Díaz to (Argentina) Boca Juniors
- (Argentina) Diego Calgaro to (Slovakia) AS Trencin
- (Argentina) Gabriel Casas to (Argentina) Real Arroyo Seco
- (Argentina) Gonzalo Belloso (retired)
- (Argentina) Hernán Castellano (released)

=== San Lorenzo ===
In

- (Argentina) Pablo Barrientos from (Russia) FC Moscow
- (Argentina) Cristian Ledesma from (Greece) Olympiacos F.C. (loan)
- (Argentina) Fabián Bordagaray from (Argentina) Defensa y Justicia
- (Argentina) Santiago Solari from (Italy) Inter

Out

- (Argentina) Daniel Bilos to (France) AS Saint-Étienne (end of loan)
- (Argentina) Sebastián Saja to (Greece) AEK Athens F.C.
- (Argentina) Néstor Villalva, (Argentina) Osvaldo Centurión & (Argentina) Matías Vega to (Argentina) Platense
- (Argentina) Andrés D'Alessandro to (Brazil) SC Internacional
- (Argentina) Diego Placente to (France) Bordeaux
- (Argentina) Jonathan Bottinelli to (Italy) U. C. Sampdoria
- (Argentina) Lautaro Formica to (Argentina) Godoy Cruz
- (Italy) Michael Díaz and (Italy) Emiliano Díaz (released)

=== San Martín de Tucumán ===
In

- (Argentina) Matías Villavicencio, (Argentina) Raúl Saavedra & (Argentina) Marcelo Perugini from (Argentina) Olimpo
- (Argentina) Patricio Pérez from (Argentina) Vélez Sársfield
- (Argentina) Mario Turdó, (Argentina) Marcelo Quinteros & (Argentina) Facundo Pérez Castro from (Argentina) Gimnasia de Jujuy
- (Argentina) Matías Ceballos from (Argentina) Central Norte
- (Argentina) Nicolás Herrera from (Argentina) San Martín de San Juan
- (Argentina) Daniel Vega from (Ecuador) Emelec
- (Argentina) Gerardo Solana from (Argentina) Godoy Cruz
- (Argentina) Bernardo Leyenda from (Argentina) Racing
- (Argentina) Pablo De Muner from (Spain) Polideportivo Ejido
- (Argentina) Marcos Gutiérrez from (Argentina) Newell's Old Boys
- (Argentina) Enzo Bruno from (Argentina) Independiente (loan)
- (Argentina) Andrés Imperiale from (Argentina) Rosario Central (loan)
- (Argentina) Antonio Ibáñez from (Argentina) 9 de Julio de Morteros

Out

- (Argentina) Mariano Campodónico to (Paraguay) Cerro Porteño
- (Argentina) Esteban Gil & (Argentina) Fernando Cravero to (Argentina) Atlético Rafaela
- (Argentina) Germán Caffa to (Argentina) Newell's Old Boys
- (Argentina) Luciano Krikorián to (Argentina) All Boys
- (Argentina) Lucas Oviedo to (Argentina) Tigre
- (Uruguay) Andrés Aparicio to (Argentina) Quilmes
- (Argentina) David Robles to (Argentina) Sarmiento
- (Argentina) Diego Romano to (Greece) Ergotelis F.C.
- (Paraguay) Juan Acosta Cabrera to (Argentina) Los Andes
- (Argentina) Pablo López & (Argentina) Emanuel Perea to (Chile) Santiago Wanderers

=== Tigre ===
In

- (Argentina) Carlos Luna from (Spain) Elche CF
- (Argentina) Mauro Villegas from (Argentina) CAI
- (Argentina) Lucas Oviedo from (Argentina) San Martín de Tucumán
- (Argentina) Maximiliano Oliva from (Argentina) River Plate (loan)
- (Argentina) Leandro Lázzaro from (Argentina) Estudiantes LP
- (Argentina) Cristian Bardaro from (Uruguay) Danubio F.C.
- (Argentina) Pablo Jerez from (Argentina) Colón (loan)
- (Argentina) Rodolfo Arruabarrena from (Greece) AEK Athens
- (Argentina) Alberto Alarcón from (Argentina) Defensores de Belgrano
- (Argentina) David Fernández from (Argentina) Godoy Cruz
- (Uruguay) Sebastián Rosano from (Italy) Cagliari

Out

- (Argentina) Guillermo Suárez to (Croatia) Dinamo Zagreb
- (Argentina) Sebastián Ereros to (Greece) Asteras Tripolis (end of loan from Vélez Sársfield)
- (Argentina) Nicolás Torres to (Argentina) Colón
- (Argentina) Román Martínez to (Spain) RCD Espanyol (end of loan from Arsenal de Sarandí)
- (Argentina) Lucas Pratto to (Norway) FC Lyn Oslo (end of loan from Boca Juniors)
- (Argentina) Facundo Diz to (Argentina) Olimpo
- (Argentina) Gastón Stang to (Argentina) Talleres
- (Argentina) Lucas Alessandria to (Argentina) Unión
- (Argentina) Martín Galmarini to (Argentina) River Plate
- (Argentina) Sebastián Pistelli to (Argentina) Deportivo Merlo
- (Argentina) Santiago Morero to (Italy) Chievo Verona
- (Paraguay) Miguel Angel Cuellar (released)

=== Vélez Sársfield ===
In

- (Argentina) Emiliano Papa from (Argentina) Rosario Central (loan return)
- (Argentina) Juan Manuel Martínez from (Saudi Arabia) Al-Shabab (loan return)
- (Argentina) Marco Torsiglieri from (Argentina) Talleres de Córdoba (loan return)
- (Argentina) Leandro Somoza from (Spain) Real Betis
- (Uruguay) Hernán Rodrigo López from (Mexico) América
- (Argentina) Fabián Cubero from (Mexico) UANL Tigres
- (Argentina) Marcelo Barovero from (Argentina) Huracán
- (Argentina) Nicolás Cabrera from (Argentina) Newell's Old Boys
- (Argentina) Roberto Nanni from (Ukraine) FC Dynamo Kyiv
- (Argentina) Emmanuel Fernandes Francou from (Paraguay) Olimpia (loan return)

Out

- (Argentina) Leonel Ríos to (Argentina) Independiente
- (Argentina) Damián Escudero to (Spain) Real Valladolid
- (Argentina) Patricio Pérez to (Argentina) San Martín de Tucumán
- (Argentina) Marcelo Bustamante & (Argentina) Maximiliano Bustos to (Argentina) Banfield
- (Argentina) Facundo Coria & (Argentina) Sergio Sena to (Argentina) Arsenal (loan)
- (Argentina) Hernán Pellerano to (Spain) UD Almería
- (Argentina) Gustavo Balvorín to (Argentina) Lanús
- (Argentina) Damián Casalinuovo to (Argentina) Platense
- (Argentina) Juan Sills to (Costa Rica) LD Alajuelense (loan)
- (Argentina) Sebastián Peratta to (Argentina) Newell's Old Boys
- (Argentina) Luciano Vella to (Romania) FC Rapid București (end of loan from Cádiz CF)
- (Argentina) Maximiliano Timpanaro to (Argentina) Chacarita Juniors (loan)
- (Argentina) Roberto Floris to (Chile) Everton de Viña del Mar

== January 2009 (summer) transfer window ==
See List of Argentine Primera División transfers January 2009
