= List of Argentine Primera División transfers January 2009 =

This is a list of football transfers involving teams from the Argentine Primera División for the January (summer) transfer window in the 2007–08 season.

== Argentinos Juniors ==
In

- (Chile) Kevin Harbottle from (Chile) Antofagasta
- (Argentina) Sebastián Torrico from (Argentina) Godoy Cruz (loan)
- (Paraguay) Derlis Cardozo from (Paraguay) Olimpia Asunción (loan)
- (Argentina) Nicolás Gianni from (Chile) Universidad Católica

Out

- (Argentina) Sergio Escudero to (Brazil) Corinthians
- (Argentina) Facundo Quiroga to (Argentina) Atlético Tucumán (loan)
- (Argentina) Leandro Fleitas to (Peru) Alianza Lima (loan)
- (Argentina) Oscar Alegre to (Argentina) Club Atlético Estudiantes (loan)
- (Argentina) Jonathan Páez and (Argentina) Marcos Ovejero to (Argentina) Defensores de Belgrano (loan)
- (Argentina) Martín Cabrera to (Argentina) Talleres de Córdoba
- (Argentina) Rodrigo Díaz to (Brazil) Atlético Paranaense
- (Argentina) Juan Ramón Fernández (released)

== Arsenal de Sarandí ==
In

- (Argentina) Mariano Uglessich from (Argentina) Vélez Sársfield
- (Argentina) Federico Poggi from (France) AC Ajaccio
- (Argentina) Francisco Daniel Martínez from (Argentina) Club Atlético Sarmiento

Out

- (Paraguay) Carlos Báez to (Paraguay) Cerro Porteno
- (Argentina) Javier Gandolfi to (Mexico) Chiapas
- (Argentina) Alejandro Gómez to (Argentina) San Lorenzo
- (Argentina) Facundo Coria to (Ecuador) Club Sport Emelec (end of loan from Vélez Sársfield)
- (Argentina) Daniel Carou to (Chile) Ñublense
- (Argentina) Gustavo Toranzo to (Paraguay) 2 de Mayo

== Banfield ==
In

- (Uruguay) Santiago Silva from (Argentina) Vélez Sársfield (loan)

Out

- (Argentina) Nilo Carretero to (Argentina) Quilmes
- (Argentina) Federico Nieto to (Argentina) Huracán
- (Uruguay) Martín Rodríguez to (Uruguay) Nacional (loan)
- (Argentina) Gonzalo Robledo to (Bolivia) Oriente Petrolero (loan)
- (Argentina) Luciano Civelli to (England) Ipswich Town
- (Argentina) Guillermo Esteban to (Peru) Coronel Bolognesi

== Boca Juniors ==
In

- (Argentina) Sebastian Alberto Battaglia from (Venezuela) UA Maracaibo (end of loan)
- (Argentina) Roberto Abbondanzieri from (Spain) Getafe CF

Out

- (Argentina) Neri Cardozo to (Mexico) Chiapas
- (Argentina) Jesús Dátolo to (Italy) Napoli
- (Argentina) Lucas Castromán to (Argentina) Racing
- (Argentina) Mauricio Caranta to (Argentina) Lanús

== Colón de Santa Fe ==
In

- (Argentina) Omar Merlo from (Argentina) River Plate (end of loan)
- (Argentina) Alexis Ferrero from (Brazil) Botafogo (loan)
- (Colombia) Daley Mena from (Uruguay) Danubio F.C. (loan)
- (Uruguay) Marcelo Guerrero from (Mexico) Club San Luis

Out

- (Argentina) Sebastián Blázquez to (Colombia) Deportivo Cali
- (Argentina) Juan Carlos Falcón and (Argentina) Rubén Ramírez to (Argentina) Racing Club
- (Argentina) César Carignano and (Argentina) Sebastián Romero to (Argentina) Independiente Rivadavia
- (Paraguay) Robert Franco to (Paraguay) 2 de Mayo
- (Argentina) Lucas Valdemarín to (Mexico) San Luis Potosí
- (Argentina) Diego Crosa and Martín Cardetti (released)

== Estudiantes de La Plata ==
In

- (Argentina) Germán Ré from (Argentina) Newell's Old Boys
- (Argentina) Cristian Sánchez Prette from (Romania) CFR Cluj
- (Argentina) Maximiliano Badell from (Argentina) Platense (loan return)
- (Argentina) Gonzalo Saucedo from (Argentina) Godoy Cruz (loan return)
- (Colombia) Carlos Valencia from (France) Dijon FCO

Out

- (Argentina) César Taborda to (Chile) Everton (loan)
- (Argentina) Mariano Barbosa to (Argentina) River Plate (loan)
- (Argentina) Iván Moreno y Fabianesi to (Argentina) Rosario Central
- (Paraguay) Cristian Bogado to (Chile) Municipal Iquique

== Gimnasia y Esgrima La Plata ==
In

Out

- (Argentina) René Lima to (Argentina) Gimnasia y Esgrima de Jujuy
- (Argentina) Nicolás Medina to (Chile) O'Higgins
- (Argentina) Martín Ortiz to (Argentina) Atlanta
- (Argentina) Carlos Kletnicki to (Argentina) Unión de Santa Fe
- (Argentina) Daniel Romero to (Argentina) Chacarita Juniors

== Gimnasia y Esgrima de Jujuy ==
In

- (Argentina) René Lima from (Argentina) Gimnasia y Esgrima La Plata
- (Argentina) Santiago Ladino from (Italy) A.S. Bari
- (Argentina) Matías Cahais from (Netherlands) FC Groningen (loan)

Out

- (Argentina) César Carranza to (Chile) Colo-Colo
- (Argentina) David Ramírez to (Chile) Unión Española
- (Argentina) Gastón Montero to (Argentina) Los Andes
- (Paraguay) Federico Acuña to (Paraguay) Tacuary (end of loan)
- (Argentina) Juan Lapietra to (Argentina) Independiente (end of loan)

== Godoy Cruz ==
In

- (Chile) Sebastián Pinto from (France) Nancy
- (Argentina) Cristian Leiva from (Paraguay) Olimpia Asunción
- (Peru) Roberto Jimenez from (Peru) Universitario
- (Uruguay) Sebastián Rodrigo Martínez from (Uruguay) C.A. Cerro

Out

- (Argentina) Daniel Garipe to (Argentina) Independiente Rivadavia
- (Argentina) Marcos Barrera to (Paraguay) Club 2 de Mayo
- (Argentina) Jonathan Schunke to (Argentina) Almagro
- (Paraguay) Víctor Ferreira to (Paraguay) Cerro Porteño (end of loan)
- (Argentina) Marcos Ramírez to (Argentina) Independiente (end of loan)
- (Argentina) Gonzalo Saucedo to (Argentina) Estudiantes (end of loan)
- (Honduras) Wilmer Crisanto to (Honduras) Victoria
- (Argentina) Gabriel González to (Chile) Santiago Wanderers

== Huracán ==
In

- (Argentina) Eduardo Domínguez from (United States) Los Angeles Galaxy
- (Argentina) Federico Nieto from (Argentina) Banfield
- (Argentina) Nicolás Trecco from (Argentina) El Linqueño
- (Uruguay) Leonardo Medina from (Colombia) Deportivo Pereira (loan)
- (Argentina) Mario Bolatti from (Portugal) FC Porto (loan)

Out

- (Argentina) Germán Castillo to (Paraguay) Cerro Porteno
- (Argentina) Matías Gigli to (Argentina) Club Atlético Aldosivi
- (Argentina) Diego Herner to (Paraguay) Cerro Porteno
- (Argentina) Alejandro Limia to (Colombia) América de Cali
- (Argentina) Hernán Barcos to (China) Shanghai Shenhua
- (Argentina) Carlos Casartelli, (Argentina) Matías Manrique y (Argentina) Hugo Barrientos (released)

== Independiente ==
In

- (Argentina) Eduardo Tuzzio from (Argentina) River Plate
- (Argentina) Juan Lapietra from (Argentina) Gimnasia y Esgrima de Jujuy (end of loan)
- (Argentina) Enzo Bruno from (Argentina) San Martín de Tucumán (end of loan)
- (Colombia) José Moreno Mora from (Colombia) América de Cali (end of loan)
- (Argentina) Marcos Ramírez from (Argentina) Godoy Cruz (end of loan)
- (Paraguay) Diego Gavilan from (Brazil) Portuguesa
- (Argentina) Gastón Machín from (Argentina) Newell's Old Boys (end of loan)

Out

- (Argentina) Mariano Herrón to (Colombia) Deportivo Cali (loan)
- (Argentina) Adrián Calello to (Croatia) Dinamo Zagreb
- (Argentina) Damián Luna to (Chile) Universidad Católica
- (Paraguay) Cristian Rolando Ledesma to (Paraguay) Olimpia
- (Colombia) Freddy Grisales to (Colombia) Envigado
- (Argentina) Hilario Navarro to (Argentina) San Lorenzo (loan)

== Lanús ==
In

- (Argentina) Mauricio Caranta from (Argentina) Boca Juniors

Out

- (Argentina) Gustavo Balvorín (released)

== Newell's Old Boys ==
In

- (Argentina) Lucas Bernardi from (France) AS Monaco
- (Paraguay) Santiago Salcedo from (Argentina) River Plate (loan)

Out

- (Argentina) Ariel Zapata (retired)
- (Argentina) German Re to (Argentina) Estudiantes de La Plata
- (Argentina) Cristian Fabbiani to (Argentina) River Plate (loan)
- (Paraguay) Walter Fretes to (Paraguay) Cerro Porteño
- (Argentina) Pablo Vranjicán to (Chile) Rangers de Talca
- (Paraguay) Diego Barreto to (Paraguay) Sol de América
- (Argentina) Luis Escalada to (United States) Real Salt Lake
- (Argentina) Juan Carlos Ferreyra to (Ecuador) Macará
- (Argentina) Marcos Flores to (Chile) Curicó Unido
- (Argentina) Héctor Gaitán to (Bolivia) Oriente Petrolero (loan)
- (Argentina) Sebastián Grazzini to (Argentina) Racing
- (Argentina) Gastón Machín to (Argentina) Independiente (end of loan)
- (Uruguay) Diego Scotti to (Uruguay) Racing de Montevideo
- (Argentina) Claudio Husaín and (Argentina) Germán Rivera (released)

== Racing Club ==
In

- (Argentina) Juan Carlos Falcón from (Argentina) Colón de Santa Fe (loan)
- (Uruguay) Nicolás Vigneri from (Mexico) Cruz Azul
- (Argentina) Lucas Castromán from (Argentina) Boca Juniors
- (Argentina) Rubén Ramírez from (Argentina) Colón de Santa Fe
- (Argentina) Sebastián Grazzini from (Argentina) Newell's Old Boys

Out

- (Argentina) Maximiliano Moralez to (Argentina) Vélez Sársfield
- (Argentina) Luis Alberto Benítez to (Ecuador) Olmedo
- (Argentina) Gabriel Méndez to (Ecuador) Olmedo
- (Argentina) Sebastián Arrieta to (Argentina) Unión de Santa Fe

== River Plate ==
In

- (Argentina) Nicolás Domingo from (Italy) Genoa C.F.C. (end of loan)
- (Argentina) Marcelo Gallardo from (United States) D.C. United
- (Argentina) Cristian Fabbiani from (Argentina) Newell's Old Boys (loan)
- (Argentina) Mariano Barbosa from (Argentina) Estudiantes de la Plata (loan)
- (Argentina) Rubens Sambueza from (Brazil) Flamengo (Return of loan

Out

- (Argentina) Omar Merlo to (Argentina) Colón de Santa Fe
- (Argentina) Eduardo Tuzzio to (Argentina) Independiente
- (Uruguay) Sebastian Abreu to (Spain) Real Sociedad
- (Argentina) Leonardo Ponzio to (Spain) Real Zaragoza
- (Paraguay) Santiago Salcedo to (Argentina) Newell's Old Boys (loan)

== Rosario Central ==
In

- (Uruguay) Gonzalo Choy from (Mexico) Monterrey
- (Argentina) Pablo Álvarez from (Italy) Catania (loan)
- (Argentina) Matías Escobar from (Turkey) Kayserispor (loan)
- (Uruguay) Pablo Lima from (Argentina) Vélez Sársfield (loan)
- (Argentina) Iván Moreno y Fabianesi from (Argentina) Estudiantes de la Plata

Out

- (Uruguay) Ignacio Ithurralde to (Uruguay) C.A. Peñarol

== San Lorenzo ==
In

- (Argentina) Alejandro Gómez from (Argentina) Arsenal de Sarandí
- (Argentina) Jonathan Bottinelli from (Italy) Sampdoria (loan)
- (Uruguay) Bruno Fornaroli from (Italy) Sampdoria (loan)
- (Paraguay) Jonathan Santana from (Germany) VfL Wolfsburg (loan)
- (Argentina) Hilario Navarro from (Argentina) Independiente (loan)

Out

- (Argentina) Walter Acevedo to (Ukraine) FC Metalist Kharkiv
- (Argentina) Santiago Hirsig to (United States) Kansas City Wizards
- (Argentina) Juan Carlos Menseguez to (England) West Bromwich Albion F.C. (loan)

== San Martín de Tucumán ==
In

- (Argentina) Cesar La Paglia from (Uruguay) Defensor Sporting
- (Argentina) Matías Urbano from (Colombia) Cúcuta
- (Uruguay) Jorge Anchén from (Sweden) AIK
- (Chile) Cristian Canio from (Chile) Everton (on loan from Atlante)

Out

- (Argentina) Enzo Bruno to (Argentina) Independiente (end of loan)
- (Argentina) Gerardo Solana to (Argentina) Defensa y Justicia
- (Argentina) Matías Ceballos to (Argentina) Gimnasia y Tiro de Salta
- (Argentina) Fabián García to (Argentina) Sportivo Guzmán
- (Argentina) Andrés Imperiale to (Bolivia) Oriente Petrolero

== Tigre ==
In

- (Argentina) Guillermo Suarez from (Croatia) Dinamo Zagreb (loan)

Out

- (Argentina) Luis David Fernández to (Argentina) Quilmes

== Vélez Sársfield ==
In

- (Argentina) Franco Razzotti from (Peru) Sporting Cristal (end of loan)
- (Argentina) Maximiliano Moralez from (Argentina) Racing Club
- (Argentina) Sebastián Domínguez from (Mexico) Club América
- (Argentina) Joaquín Larrivey from (Italy) Cagliari (loan)
- (Argentina) Maximiliano Timpanaro from (Argentina) Chacarita Juniors (end of loan)

Out

- (Argentina) Emmanuel Fernandes Francou to (Argentina) Talleres de Córdoba
- (Uruguay) Pablo Lima to (Argentina) Rosario Central (loan)
- (Uruguay) Santiago Silva to (Argentina) Banfield (loan)
- (Argentina) Mariano Uglessich to (Argentina) Arsenal de Sarandí
