= Santiago Raymonda =

Argentine footballer

Personal information
- Full name: Santiago Raymonda
- Date of birth: April 3, 1979 (age 47)
- Place of birth: San José de la Esquina, Argentina
- Height: 1.69 m (5 ft 7 in)
- Position: Attacking midfielder

Team information
- Current team: León (assistant)

Senior career*
Years	Team	Apps	(Gls)
2001–2002	Central Córdoba	35	(10)
2002–2003	Quilmes	31	(4)
2003–2005	Instituto de Córdoba	36	(8)
2005–2007	Arsenal de Sarandí	76	(10)
2008	Veracruz	17	(1)
2008–2009	Banfield	23	(1)
2009–2010	Argentinos Juniors	26	(2)
2010–2011	Quilmes	30	(1)
2011–2012	Chacarita Juniors	10	(0)
2012	Oriente Petrolero	18	(1)
2012	Central Córdoba	10	(0)
2012–2015	Boca Unidos	65	(5)
2015	Talleres Córdoba	7	(0)
2016	Alumni de Villa María		

Managerial career
- 2023: Talleres (assistant)
- 2024: Independiente del Valle (assistant)
- 2025: Atlético Nacional (assistant)
- 2026–: León (assistant)
- * Club domestic league appearances and goals as of 12 May 2015

Santiago Raymonda (born 3 April 1979) is a former Argentine football midfielder who last played for Alumni de Villa María in the Torneo Federal A. His move to Arsenal de Sarandí in the 2006-2007 season helped the club to qualify for the Copa Libertadores for the first time in their history.

== Club career ==
Raymonda started his career in the Argentina 2nd Division with Central Córdoba in 2001. In 2002, he joined Quilmes Atlético Club and in 2003 he moved to Instituto de Córdoba where he helped the club to win the Apertura 2003 tournament and promotion to the Primera División. During the 2004-2005 season he helped Instituto to maintain their place in the top flight.

In 2005, Raymonda moved to Arsenal de Sarandí and in the 2006-2007 season where he helped the club to qualify for the Copa Libertadores for the first time in their history. In, 2007 he was part of the Arsenal squad that won the 2007 Copa Sudamericana, which was the first major championship in the history of the club.

Following his success with Arsenal he spent a season with Mexican side CD Veracruz and in 2008 he returned to Argentina to play for Banfield

In 2009, he was signed by new Argentinos Juniors manager Claudio Borghi and he was part of the squad that won the 2010 Clausura championship. He played in 9 of the club's 19 games during their championship winning campaign, scoring 1 goal. Following that tournament, Raymonda joined recently promoted Quilmes.

== Honours ==
Instituto

- Primera B Nacional (1): Apertura 2003

Arsenal de Sarandí

- Copa Sudamericana (1): 2007

Argentinos Juniors

- Argentine Primera División (1): 2010 Clausura
