= Sergio Sena =

Argentine footballer

Personal information
- Full name: Sergio Román Sena
- Date of birth: August 25, 1982 (age 44)
- Place of birth: Buenos Aires, Argentina
- Height: 1.69 m (5 ft 7 in)
- Position: Right winger

Team information
- Current team: Gimnasia y Esgrima

Senior career*
| Years | Team | Apps | (Gls) |
| 1996–2001 | Tallers (RE) | | |
| 2002–2008 | Vélez Sársfield | 131 | (7) |
| 2008–2009 | → Arsenal de Sarandí (loan) | 24 | (2) |
| 2009–2012 | Arsenal de Sarandí | 54 | (3) |
| 2012–2013 | Independiente Rivadavia | 16 | (1) |
| 2013–2014 | Sarmiento | 9 | (0) |
| 2014–2015 | Tiro Federal | 6 | (0) |
| 2015– | Gimnasia y Esgrima | 6 | (1) |
- * Club domestic league appearances and goals as of 20 May 2015

Sergio Román Sena (born 25 August 1982) is an Argentine football winger who plays for Gimnasia y Esgrima of the Torneo Argentino A.

== Career ==
Sena started his playing career in 1996 with Talleres de Remedios de Escalada in the lower leagues of Argentine football.

In 2002, he was signed by Vélez Sársfield of the Argentine Primera in 2005 Sena was part of the squad that won the Clausura 2005 tournament. In 2007 Sena made his 100th league appearance for the club.

== Honours ==
Vélez Sársfield

- Argentine Primera División: 2005 Clausura

Arsenal

- Argentine Primera División: 2012 Clausura
