= Carou =

Carou is a surname. Notable people with the surname include:

- Daniel Carou (born 1984), Argentine footballer
- Gonzalo Carou (born 1979), Argentine handball player
- Ignacio Carou (born 1999), Argentine-Uruguayan tennis player
- María Mariño Carou (1907–1967), Spanish writer
