= Emanuel Centurión =

Argentine footballer (born 1982)

Personal information
- Full name: Emanuel Adrián Centurión
- Date of birth: 25 August 1982 (age 44)
- Place of birth: Lomas de Zamora, Argentina
- Height: 1.76 m (5 ft 9 in)
- Position: Left winger

Senior career*
Years	Team	Apps	(Gls)
2001–2003	Vélez Sársfield	45	(3)
2003–2004	VfB Stuttgart	6	(0)
2005–2006	Vélez Sársfield	35	(4)
2006–2007	Colón	29	(5)
2008–2011	Atlas	13	(1)
2008–2009	→ Independiente (loan)	16	(0)
2009–2010	→ Chacarita Juniors (loan)	34	(1)
2010	→ U. de Chile (loan)	7	(0)
2011	→ San Martín de Tucumán (loan)	19	(1)
2011–2012	Chacarita Juniors	22	(0)
2012–2014	Alvarado	14	(0)
2014–2015	Sud América	30	(0)
2016–2017	Independiente Rivadavia	5	(0)
2017	Atlético Baradero	4	(0)
- * Club domestic league appearances and goals

Emanuel Centurión (born 25 August 1982) is an Argentine football midfielder.

== Career ==
Born in Lomas de Zamora, Centurión started his career in 2001 with Vélez Sársfield. Between 2003 and 2004 he played for VfB Stuttgart in Germany.

In 2005 Centurión returned to Velez and helped them to win the Clausura 2005 tournament.

Centurión left Vélez to join Colón for the 2006 Clausura, and was signed by Mexican side Atlas in January 2008. His Mexican spell would be short-lived however, Centurión returning to Argentina with Buenos Aires club Independiente for the start of the 2008 Apertura Tournament.

== Honours ==
Vélez Sársfield

- Primera División Argentina: Clausura 2005
