= Robredo =

Robredo is a surname. Notable people with the surname include:

- Álvaro Robredo (born 1993), Spanish cyclist
- Jesse Robredo (1958–2012), Filipino politician
- Leni Robredo (born 1965), Filipina lawyer and social activist
- Tommy Robredo (born 1982), Spanish tennis player

== See also ==
- Robledo (name)
