= Adrián Lucero =

Argentine footballer

Personal information
- Full name: Óscar Adrián Lucero
- Date of birth: August 16, 1985 (age 41)
- Place of birth: Las Heras, Argentina
- Height: 1.78 m (5 ft 10 in)
- Position: Central midfielder

Team information
- Current team: Enosis Neon Paralimni
- Number: 7

Senior career*
Years	Team	Apps	(Gls)
2004–2008	Newell's Old Boys	82	(4)
2008–2011	Racing Club	62	(5)
2011–2012	Olimpo	14	(1)
2012–2013	Panthrakikos	28	(4)
2013–2014	AEK Larnaca	15	(0)
2014	Apollon Smyrnis	14	(2)
2014–2018	Xanthi	107	(7)
2018–2020	Panetolikos	46	(1)
2020–	Enosis Neon Paralimni	38	(0)
- * Club domestic league appearances and goals as of 9 June 2021

Óscar Adrián Lucero (born 16 August 1984) is an Argentine professional footballer who plays as a central midfielder for Enosis Neon Paralimni.

== Career ==
Lucero made his professional debut in March 2004 for Newell's, later that year the club won the Apertura 2004 championship, but Lucero watched from the sidelines without making a single first team appearance.

From 2005 onwards Lucero has established himself as a regular member of the Newell's Old Boys first team. From 2012 onwards he plays in Greece.
