= Marcelo Bustamante =

Argentine football left-back

Personal information
- Full name: Walter Marcelo Bustamante
- Date of birth: 17 February 1980 (age 46)
- Place of birth: Villa Tesei, Argentina
- Height: 1.74 m (5 ft 9 in)
- Position: Left back

Team information
- Current team: CA Sarmiento

Senior career*
Years	Team	Apps	(Gls)
2000–2008	Vélez Sársfield	91	(1)
2002–2003	→Olimpo (loan)	21	(3)
2004	→Arsenal de Sarandí (loan)	12	(1)
2008–2013	Banfield	151	(5)
2013–2014	All Boys	24	(1)
2014–	CA Sarmiento	4	(0)
- * Club domestic league appearances and goals as of 25 March 2015

Walter Marcelo Bustamante (born 17 February 1980 in Villa Tesei, Buenos Aires) is an Argentine football left-back currently playing for Club Atlético Sarmiento.

Bustamante made his professional debut in 2000 for Vélez Sársfield, he was loaned out to Olimpo for the 2002–2003 season and had another loan spell with Arsenal de Sarandí in 2004.

In 2005 Sena was part of the squad that won the Clausura 2005 tournament. Bustamante has made over 100 appearances for Velez in all competitions.

In 2008, he joined Banfield and in 2009 he was part of the squad that won the Argentine championship for the first time in the history of the club, featuring in every game of the Apertura 2009 championship, which they won on the final day of the season.

== Honours ==
Vélez Sarsfield

- Primera División Argentina: Clausura 2005

Banfield

- Primera División Argentina: Apertura 2009
