= Sebastián Peratta =

Argentine footballer

Personal information
- Full name: Sebastián Diego Peratta
- Date of birth: November 1, 1976 (age 49)
- Place of birth: Buenos Aires, Argentina
- Height: 1.90 m (6 ft 3 in)
- Position: Goalkeeper

Team information
- Current team: Deportivo Morón

Senior career*
Years	Team	Apps	(Gls)
1999–2003	Deportivo Morón	125	(2)
2003–2008	Vélez Sársfield	65	(0)
2008–2013	Newell's Old Boys	154	(0)
2013–2014	Quilmes	22	(0)
2014–	Deportivo Morón	30	(0)
- * Club domestic league appearances and goals as of 10 May 2015

Sebastián Diego Peratta (born 1 November 1976 in Buenos Aires) is an Argentine football goalkeeper currently playing for Deportivo Morón in the Primera B Metropolitana.

Peratta started his career in 1999 with Deportivo Morón in the lower leagues of Argentine football. In 2003, he was signed by Vélez Sársfield of the Argentine Primera, but after being used as the first choice goalkeeper in his first season he was mainly used as a reserve goalkeeper.

In 2005 Peratta was part of the squad that won the Clausura 2005 tournament.

In 2007 Peratta began to re-establish himself as the no 1 goalkeeper at Velez, but in September that year he tore the cruciate knee ligament in his right knee. He was transferred to Newell's Old Boys in August 2008.

== Honours ==
Vélez Sársfield

- Primera División: 2005 Clausura

Newell's Old Boys

- Primera División: 2013 Final
