= Germán Caffa =

Argentine footballer

Personal information
- Full name: Germán Martín Caffa
- Date of birth: 13 September 1980 (age 46)
- Place of birth: Concepción del Uruguay, Argentina
- Height: 1.90 m (6 ft 3 in)
- Position: Goalkeeper

Senior career*
| Years | Team | Apps | (Gls) |
| 1999–2000 | Gimnasia CdU | 0 | (0) |
| 2000–2002 | Ferro Carril Oeste | 14 | (0) |
| 2003 | Crucero del Norte | – | (–) |
| 2004 | Atlético Candelaria | 30 | (2) |
| 2005 | General Caballero ZC | 8 | (0) |
| 2005–2006 | Olimpia | 23 | (0) |
| 2006 | Palestino | 3 | (0) |
| 2007 | Tacuary | 0 | (0) |
| 2007–2008 | San Martín Tucumán | 36 | (0) |
| 2008–2010 | Newell's Old Boys | 8 | (0) |
| 2010 | → Nacional Asunción (loan) | 21 | (0) |
| 2010–2012 | La Equidad | 27 | (0) |
| 2012 | Nacional Asunción | 4 | (0) |
| 2012–2013 | Banfield | 7 | (0) |
| 2013–2015 | Crucero del Norte | 63 | (0) |
| 2016 | Sportivo Luqueño | 15 | (0) |
| 2017–2018 | Cortuluá | 52 | (0) |
| 2019 | 2 de Mayo | | |
| 2020–2021 | Sportivo Iteño | | |
| 2022 | Deportivo Recoleta | | |
- * Club domestic league appearances and goals

Germán Martín Caffa (born 15 August 1982, in Concepción del Uruguay) is an Argentine former footballer who played as a goalkeeper.

== Teams ==
- (Argentina) Gimnasia y Esgrima CdU 1999–2000
- (Argentina) Ferro Carril Oeste 2000–2002
- (Argentina) Crucero del Norte 2003
- (Argentina) Atletico Candelaria 2004
- (Paraguay) General Caballero ZC 2005
- (Paraguay) Olimpia 2005–2006
- (Chile) Palestino 2006
- (Paraguay) Tacuary 2007
- (Argentina) San Martín de Tucumán 2007–2008
- (Argentina) Newell's Old Boys 2008–2010
- (Paraguay) Nacional (loan) 2010
- (Colombia) La Equidad 2010–2012
- (Paraguay) Nacional 2012
- (Argentina) Banfield 2012–2013
- (Argentina) Crucero del Norte 2013–2015
- (Paraguay) Sportivo Luqueño 2016
- (Colombia) Cortuluá 2017–2018
- (Paraguay) 2 de Mayo 2019
- (Paraguay) Sportivo Iteño 2020–2021
- (Paraguay) Deportivo Recoleta 2022

== Personal life ==
Caffa naturalized Paraguayan in 2016.
