= 2004–05 Argentine Primera División =

114th season of top-tier football league in Argentina

Primera División
- Season: 2004–05
- Dates: 15 August 2004 – 3 July 2005
- Champions: Apertura: Newell's Old Boys (5th title); Clausura: Vélez Sarsfield (6th title)
- 2006 Copa Libertadores: Newell's Old Boys; Vélez Sársfield; River Plate; Estudiantes LP; Rosario Central
- 2005 Copa Sudamericana: Newell's Old Boys; Vélez Sársfield; Estudiantes LP; Rosario Central; Banfield
- Matches: 380

The 2004–05 Argentine Primera División was the 114th season of top-flight football in Argentina. The season ran from 15 August 2004 to 3 July 2005.

Four teams promoted from Primera B Nacional, they were Instituto de Córdoba, Almagro (2003–04 Primera B Nacional champions and runners-up, respectively), plus Argentinos Juniors and Huracán de Tres Arroyos (which had won the promotion playoff the previous year).

Newell's Old Boys won the Apertura (5th league title) and Vélez Sársfield won the Clausura (6th title) championships, while Huracán de Tres Arroyos and Almagro were relegated.

== Torneo Apertura ==
Apertura
- Season: 2004
- Dates: 13 August – 12 December
- Champions: Newell's Old Boys (5th. title)
- Promoted: Instituto (C); Almagro; Argentinos Juniors; Huracán (TA)
- Top goalscorer: (Argentina) Lisandro López (12)
- Biggest home win: Boca 6–0 Vélez (22 Sep)
- Biggest away win: GELP 0–3 Arsenal (28 Nov)

=== Final standings ===
Pos	Team	Pld	W	D	L	GF	GA	GD	Pts	Qualification
1	Newell's Old Boys	19	10	6	3	22	11	+11	36	2006 Copa Libertadores Second Stage
2	Vélez Sársfield	19	10	4	5	21	16	+5	34	
3	River Plate	19	9	6	4	28	19	+9	33	
4	Estudiantes (LP)	19	7	9	3	22	14	+8	30	
5	San Lorenzo	19	8	6	5	29	22	+7	30	
6	Rosario Central	19	8	6	5	19	15	+4	30	
7	Colón	19	7	6	6	24	22	+2	27	
8	Boca Juniors	19	7	5	7	22	16	+6	26	
9	Banfield	19	6	8	5	24	22	+2	26	
10	Racing	19	8	2	9	22	21	+1	26	
11	Lanús	19	6	8	5	25	26	−1	26	
12	Gimnasia y Esgrima (LP)	19	6	7	6	16	23	−7	25	
13	Arsenal	19	5	9	5	17	16	+1	24	
14	Quilmes	19	6	6	7	14	18	−4	24	
15	Independiente	19	6	5	8	23	26	−3	23	
16	Argentinos Juniors	19	6	4	9	17	17	0	22	
17	Almagro	19	4	10	5	15	18	−3	22	
18	Olimpo	19	4	5	10	21	29	−8	17	
19	Instituto	19	2	8	9	16	30	−14	14	
20	Huracán (TA)	19	2	6	11	19	34	−15	12	

Source: AFA
Rules for classification: 1st points; 2nd goal difference; 3rd goals scored; 4th head-to-head points; 5th head-to-head goal difference; 6th head-to-head goals scored. This does not apply to determining the champion. If two or more teams are tied in point at the end of the tournament, a playoff will be held at a neutral venue within 72 hours for the championship

=== Top scorers ===
Rank.	Player	Team	Goals
1	(Argentina) Lisandro López	Racing	12
2	(Argentina) Jeremías Caggiano	Huracán (TA)	8
2	(Argentina) Osvaldo Miranda	Almagro	8
2	(Argentina) Rolando Zárate	Vélez Sársfield	8
3	(Argentina) Nicolás Frutos	Gimnasia y Esgrima (LP)	7
3	(Argentina) Claudio Graf	Lanús	7
3	(Argentina) Rodrigo Palacio	Banfield	7
3	(Argentina) Emanuel Villa	Rosario Central	7

== Torneo Clausura ==
Clausura
- Season: 2005
- Dates: 11 February – 3 July
- Champions: Vélez Sársfield (6th. title)
- Relegated: Huracán (TA); Almagro
- Top goalscorer: (Argentina) Mariano Pavone (16)
- Biggest home win: Lanús 6–0 Almagro (11 Jun)
- Biggest away win: Almagro 0–5 Colón (20 Mar)
- Highest scoring: Almagro 2–5 River (24 Apr)

=== Final standings ===
Pos	Team	Pld	W	D	L	GF	GA	GD	Pts	Qualification
1	Vélez Sársfield	19	11	6	2	32	14	+18	39	2006 Copa Libertadores Second Stage
2	Banfield	19	10	3	6	25	16	+9	33	
3	Racing	19	9	5	5	25	17	+8	32	
4	Estudiantes (LP)	19	8	7	4	28	23	+5	31	
5	Rosario Central	19	8	7	4	26	23	+3	31	
6	Arsenal	19	8	6	5	27	22	+5	30	
7	Gimnasia y Esgrima (LP)	19	9	2	8	25	25	0	29	
8	Lanús	19	7	7	5	36	27	+9	28	
9	Instituto (C)	19	8	4	7	32	30	+2	28	
10	River Plate	19	8	3	8	31	29	+2	27	
11	Colón	19	6	8	5	30	23	+7	26	
12	Independiente	19	6	8	5	29	26	+3	26	
13	Olimpo	19	7	5	7	18	22	−4	26	
14	Newell's Old Boys	19	5	9	5	22	21	+1	24	
15	Boca Juniors	19	6	4	9	26	30	−4	22	
16	San Lorenzo	19	6	4	9	23	29	−6	22	
17	Argentinos Juniors	19	5	6	8	28	30	−2	21	
18	Quilmes	19	5	5	9	16	23	−7	20	
19	Almagro	19	3	4	12	22	44	−22	13	
20	Huracán (TA)	19	0	5	14	11	41	−30	5	

Source: AFA
Rules for classification: 1st points; 2nd goal difference; 3rd goals scored; 4th head-to-head points; 5th head-to-head goal difference; 6th head-to-head goals scored. This does not apply to determining the champion. If two or more teams are tied in point at the end of the tournament, a playoff will be held at a neutral venue within 72 hours for the championship

=== Top scorers ===
Rank.	Player	Team	Goals
1	(Argentina) Mariano Pavone	Estudiantes (LP)	16
2	(Argentina) Esteban Fuertes	Colón	11
3	(Argentina) Nicolás Frutos	Independiente	10
4	(Argentina) José Luis Calderón	Arsenal	9
4	(Argentina) Claudio Enría	Gimnasia y Esgrima (LP)	9
4	(Uruguay) Josemir Lujambio	Instituto (C)	9

== Relegation ==
=== Relegation table ===
Pos	Team	2002–03 Pts	2003–04 Pts	2004–05 Pts	Total Pts	Total Pld	Avg	Relegation
1	River Plate	79	66	60	205	114	1.798	
2	Boca Juniors	79	75	48	202	114	1.772	
3	Vélez Sársfield	66	53	73	192	114	1.614	
4	Banfield	48	64	59	171	114	1.5	
5	San Lorenzo	56	62	52	170	114	1.491	
6	Rosario Central	62	44	61	167	114	1.465	
7	Racing	53	50	58	161	114	1.412	
8	Newell's Old Boys	49	51	60	160	114	1.404	
9	Colón	57	49	53	159	114	1.395	
10	Arsenal	49	55	54	158	114	1.386	
11	Quilmes	—	60	44	104	76	1.368	
12	Independiente	61	44	49	154	114	1.351	
13	Estudiantes (LP)	43	44	61	148	114	1.298	
14	Lanús	51	42	54	147	114	1.289	
15	Gimnasia y Esgrima (LP)	46	38	54	138	114	1.211	
16	Olimpo	51	39	43	133	114	1.167	
17	Argentinos Juniors	—	—	43	43	38	1.132	Relegation Playoff Matches
18	Instituto	—	—	42	42	38	1.105	Relegation Playoff Matches
19	Almagro	—	—	35	35	38	0.921	Relegated to the Primera B Nacional
20	Huracán (TA)	—	—	17	17	38	0.447	Relegated to the Primera B Nacional

=== Promotion playoff ===
* Winner of the series; teams currently playing in Primera División are listed first

Series	Team 1 (1st div)	Team 2 (2nd div)	1st. leg	Venue 1	City 1	2nd. leg	Venue 2	City 2	Agg.
1	Argentinos Juniors	Atlético de Rafaela	1–2	Nuevo Monumental	Rafaela	3–0	Diego A. Maradona	Buenos Aires	4–2
2	Instituto (C)	Huracán	2–1	Tomás A. Ducó	Buenos Aires	1–0	Juan D. Perón	Córdoba	3–1

Argentinos Juniors and Instituto remained in Primera División

== See also ==
- 2004-05 in Argentine football
