= Omar Zarif =

Argentine footballer

Personal information
- Full name: Omar Zarif
- Date of birth: 9 February 1978 (age 48)
- Place of birth: Avellaneda, Argentina
- Height: 1.66 m (5 ft 5 in)
- Position: Right winger

Senior career*
Years	Team	Apps	(Gls)
1998–2002	Dock Sud	98	(5)
2002–2003	El Porvenir	32	(2)
2003–2004	Los Andes	31	(0)
2004–2005	Defensa y Justicia	14	(0)
2005–2007	Nueva Chicago	70	(2)
2007–2008	Huracán	28	(0)
2008–2009	Rosario Central	25	(1)
2009–2010	Chacarita Juniors	37	(2)
2010–2012	Rosario Central	46	(0)
2012–2015	Banfield	40	(1)
Total		421	(13)

Managerial career
- 2015: Banfield (assistant)
- 2015–2018: Guadalajara (assistant)
- 2018–2022: San Jose Earthquakes (assistant)
- 2022–2023: AEK Athens (assistant)
- * Club domestic league appearances and goals

Omar Zarif (born 9 February 1978) is an Argentine professional football manager and former player.

== Playing career ==
Zarif started his playing career in 1998 with Dock Sud in the regionalised 4th division. The club were relegated and Zarif continued playing for them in the regionalised 5th division.

In 2002, he was signed by El Porvenir of the National 2nd division, he then had spells with other 2nd division teams; Los Andes, Defensa y Justicia and Nueva Chicago. In 2006, he was part of the Nueva Chicago team that won promotion to the Argentine Primera. The club was relegated at the end of the 2006–2007 season, but Zarif was signed by newly promoted Huracán keeping his place in the top division of Argentine football.

For the 2008–09 season Zarif signed for Rosario Central, and in 2009 he joined newly promoted Chacarita Juniors. For the 2010–11 season, Zarif returned to Rosario Central, this time to play in the second division.

== Managerial career ==
Zarif played under Matias Almeyda at Banfield, helping the club earn promotion to Argentina's top league during the 2013–14 season. Midway through Banfield's 2015 season, he switched from playing to coaching and remained on Almeyda's staff when Almeyda became manager of Chivas later in the year. Omar Zarif joined San Jose as an assistant coach under Almeyda ahead of the 2019 MLS season.
