= Maximiliano Bustos =

Argentine football midfielder

Personal information
- Full name: Maximiliano Andres Bustos
- Date of birth: January 5, 1982 (age 44)
- Place of birth: San Luis, Argentina
- Height: 1.70 m (5 ft 7 in)
- Position: Defensive midfielder

Team information
- Current team: San Martín (San Juan)
- Number: 26

Senior career*
| Years | Team | Apps | (Gls) |
| 2000–2008 | Vélez Sársfield | 169 | (2) |
| 2008–2011 | Banfield | 65 | (1) |
| 2011– | San Martín (San Juan) | 79 | (0) |
- * Club domestic league appearances and goals as of 26 March 2015

Maximiliano Andres Bustos (born 5 January 1982 in San Luis) is an Argentine football midfielder currently playing for San Martín de San Juan.

== Career ==
Bustos made his professional debut in 2000 for Velez Sarsfield. In 2005, he was part of the squad that won the Clausura 2005 tournament. He made over 150 league appearances for the club.

In 2008, he joined Banfield where he was part of the squad that won the Argentine championship for the first time in the history of the club, clinching the Apertura 2009 championship on the final day of the season.

== Honours ==
Vélez Sarsfield

- Primera División Argentina: Clausura 2005

Banfield

- Primera División Argentina: Apertura 2009
