= Ariel Zapata =

Argentine footballer

Personal information
- Full name: Ariel Hernán Zapata
- Date of birth: September 2, 1974 (age 52)
- Place of birth: Florencio Varela, Argentina
- Height: 1.79 m (5 ft 10 in)
- Positions: Midfielder; defender

Senior career*
Years	Team	Apps	(Gls)
1992–2004	Estudiantes	250	(4)
2004–2008	Newell's Old Boys	108	(3)
- * Club domestic league appearances and goals as of 23:45, 20 December 2008 (UTC)

Ariel "Pepi" Zapata (born 2 September 1974 in Florencio Varela) is an Argentine retired footballer who last played for Newell's Old Boys.

Zapata started his playing career in 1992 with Estudiantes de La Plata. in his first season with the club they won the second division championship. He played with the club in the Argentine Primera División until 2004, when he was signed by Newell's Old Boys manager Américo Gallego.

In his first season with Newell's he was part of the squad that won the Apertura 2004 championship. He went on to make over 100 appearances for the club.

Zapata retired from professional football on 12 December 2008 in a match against Racing Club. Zapata missed a penalty in that match, which Hernán Bernardello put in after the kick.

== Titles ==
Season	Team	Title
1994–1995	Estudiantes	Primera B Nacional
Apertura 2004	Newell's Old Boys	Primera División Argentina
