= Robledo (name) =

Robledo is both a surname and a given name. Notable people with the name include:

- Carmelo Robledo (1912 – c. 1981), Argentine boxer
- Francisco Robledo (1909–?), Mexican hammer thrower
- George Robledo (1926–1989), Chilean athlete
- Gonzalo Robledo (born 1987), Argentine footballer
- Hania Robledo, Oscar nominated art director
- Irene Robledo (1890–1988), Mexican educator and humanist
- Jorge Robledo (1500–1546), Spanish conquistador
- José María Robledo (born 1939), Argentine Olympic rower
- Juan Robledo (born 1979), Chilean footballer
- Lorenzo Robledo (1921–2006), Spanish actor
- Marcelo Robledo (born 1978), Argentine footballer
- Reev Robledo, music composer
- Ted Robledo (1928–1970), Chilean footballer

Given name:

- Robledo Puch (born 1952), Argentine serial killer
