= Gonzalo Saucedo =

Argentine footballer

Personal information
- Full name: Gonzalo Hernán Saucedo
- Date of birth: February 16, 1985 (age 41)
- Place of birth: Corrientes, Argentina
- Height: 1.70 m (5 ft 7 in)
- Position: Midfielder

Youth career
- Atlético Candelaria

Senior career*
Years	Team	Apps	(Gls)
2004–2005	Atlético Candelaria	–	(–)
2006–2010	Estudiantes LP	24	(1)
2008	→ Godoy Cruz (loan)	2	(0)
2009	→ Independiente Rivadavia (loan)	0	(0)
2009–2010	→ Unión Santa Fe (loan)	33	(7)
2010–2011	Tiro Federal	16	(1)
2011	Central Córdoba SdE	0	(0)
2012–2014	Textil Mandiyú	35	(4)
2014	Villa Mitre	9	(0)
2014	Cambaceres	12	(2)
2015	Juventud Unida (G)	20	(0)
2016	Defensores de Salto	9	(0)
2016	Coquimbo Unido	4	(0)
2017–2018	Deportivo Mandiyú	–	(–)
2019–2022	Juventud Unida (G)	64	(3)
Total		228	(18)
- * Club domestic league appearances and goals

Gonzalo Hernán Saucedo (born 16 February 1985) is a former Argentine football midfielder.

== Career ==
Born in Corrientes, Saucedo began playing in Estudiantes' youth system. He joined the club's senior side in 2006 where he made his Primera debut. During his first year in the Estudiantes 1st team he helped them to win the Apertura 2006 tournament. He spent the second half of 2008 on loan to Godoy Cruz.

== Titles ==
Season	Club	Title
Apertura 2006	Estudiantes	Primera Division Argentina
