= Hugo Iriarte =

Argentine footballer

Personal information
- Full name: Hugo Germán Iriarte
- Date of birth: March 26, 1982 (age 44)
- Place of birth: Alta Gracia, Argentina
- Height: 1.77 m (5 ft 10 in)
- Position: Left back

Team information
- Current team: Guillermo Brown

Senior career*
Years	Team	Apps	(Gls)
2002–2003	Argentino de Rosario	30	(3)
2003–2005	Newell's Old Boys	19	(0)
2005–2008	Colón de Santa Fe	22	(0)
2008–2011	Gimnasia y Esgrima La Plata	35	(0)
2011–2012	Atlético de Rafaela	16	(0)
2013–2014	San Martín de San Juan	12	(0)
2014	3 de Febrero	7	(0)
2015–	Guillermo Brown	10	(0)
- * Club domestic league appearances and goals as of 19 April 2015

Hugo Germán Iriarte (born 26 March 1982) is an Argentine football defender. He currently plays for Guillermo Brown.

== Career ==
Iriarte started his career in 2002 with Argentino de Rosario in the Primera B Metropolitana (Argentine third division). In 2003, he joined Newell's Old Boys, where he was part of the squad that won the 2004 Apertura.

In 2005, Iriarte left Newell's to join Colón. In 2008, he left Colón to join Club de Gimnasia y Esgrima La Plata. In 2011, after suffering relegation with Gimnasia, he joined recently promoted Atlético de Rafaela.

== Honours ==
Newell's Old Boys

- Argentine Primera División (1): 2004 Apertura
