= Héctor Gaitán =

Argentine footballer

Personal information
- Full name: Héctor Luis Gaitán
- Date of birth: February 9, 1987 (age 39)
- Place of birth: Cruz Alta, Córdoba Province, Argentina
- Height: 1.84 m (6 ft 0 in)
- Position: Defender

Team information
- Current team: Sport Boys Warnes

Youth career
- Newell's Old Boys

Senior career*
Years	Team	Apps	(Gls)
2007–2010	Newell's Old Boys	17	(0)
2009	→ Oriente Petrolero (loan)	27	(0)
2010	→ Colegio Nacional Iquitos (loan)	5	(6)
2010–2011	Juventud Antoniana		
2011–2012	Municipal Real Mamoré	15	(2)
2012	Nacional Potosí	10	(0)
2013	Sportivo Carapeguá		
2013–	Sport Boys Warnes	38	(2)
- * Club domestic league appearances and goals as of 15 April 2015

Héctor Luis Gaitán (born February 9, 1987) is an Argentine footballer who plays as a defender for Bolivian side Sport Boys Warnes.

== Career ==
Gaitán was born in Cruz Alta, Córdoba Province. He made his debut in first division with Newell's Old Boys on March 11, 2007, in a 1–0 victory over Argentinos Juniors. By 2008 he had established himself as a regular member of the first team, but mainly coming off the bench. He received his nickname, Patadita (little kick), for his tendency to commit penalty kicks during this season. In 2009, he joined Peruvian side Colegio Nacional Iquitos, and made his debut on February 15, against club Real Mamoré in Bolivia. On May 3, 2009, Gaitán scored his first goal as a refinero in a visit to club San José from Oruro. After his return to Newell's Old Boys in summer 2010 was released and he joined to Torneo Argentino A side Juventud Antoniana. He played only one season for Antoniana and returned in June 2011 to Bolivia and signed for Municipal Real Mamoré.
