= Martín Seri =

Argentine footballer

Personal information
- Date of birth: December 9, 1983 (age 42)
- Place of birth: Chabás, Argentina
- Height: 1.69 m (5 ft 7 in)
- Position: Midfielder

Team information
- Current team: Tiro Federal

Youth career
- Newell's Old Boys

Senior career*
Years	Team	Apps	(Gls)
2003–2008	Newell's Old Boys		
2004–2005	→ Atlético Tucumán (loan)		
2008–2009	→ San Martín (SJ) (loan)		
2009–	→ Quilmes (loan) clubs 5: Atlético Unión de Mar del Plata clubs 6: Tiro Federal, Rosario		
- * Club domestic league appearances and goals as of 10:23, 4 October 2009 (UTC)

Martín Seri (born 9 December 1983 in Chabás, Santa Fe) is an Argentine football midfielder, who played for many football teams in Argentina.He is characterized for his ability to play different positions.

Seri was a youngster in the Newell's Old Boys youth team, when he was loaned to Atlético Tucumán in the regionalised 3rd division for the 2004–2005 season. Seri made his debut for Newell's in November 2005.

In 2008, he was loaned to San Martín de San Juan of the Primera B Nacional and in 2009 he joined Quilmesuntil 2010. In November, 2010, he played for "Talleres" in Cordoba, Argentina, and he left this club in June, 2011. That same year he became part of "Atlético Unión" team, in Mar del Plata city, where he played until June, 2012. He is currently playing for "Tiro Federal" in Rosario, Argentina.
