= Gustavo Balvorín =

Argentine footballer

Personal information
- Full name: Gustavo Alberto Balvorín
- Date of birth: September 6, 1977 (age 49)
- Place of birth: San Miguel Tucumán, Argentina
- Height: 1.80 m (5 ft 11 in)
- Position: Forward

Team information
- Current team: Villa San Antonio

Senior career*
Years	Team	Apps	(Gls)
1998	Ñuñorco	8	(4)
1998–1999	Gimnasia (J)	32	(5)
2000	Barcelona SC	5	(1)
2000–2002	Gimnasia (J)	22	(3)
2002–2003	Aldosivi	17	(7)
2003	Atlético Tucumán	9	(0)
2003–2006	Gimnasia (J)	79	(28)
2007–2008	Velez Sarsfield	43	(14)
2008–2009	Lanús	4	(0)
2009–2010	Levadiakos	14	(1)
2010	Huracán	17	(3)
2010–2011	Gimnasia de Jujuy	29	(7)
2011–2013	San Martín Tucumán	?	(27)
2013–2014	Platense	6	(0)
2014–2018	Juventud Antoniana	95	(44)
2019–	Villa San Antonio		
- * Club domestic league appearances and goals as of 21:52, 3 November 2019 (UTC)

Gustavo Balvorín (born 6 September 1977 in San Miguel de Tucumán) is an Argentine football forward who plays for Villa San Antonio.

== Career ==
Balvorín finished the Apertura 2006 tournament as Gimnasia y Esgrima de Jujuy's top scorer with 7 goals in 17 games, prompting his transfer to Vélez.

In 2008, he joined Lanús and on 1 April 2009 Balvorin and Lanus have mutually agreed to terminate the player's contract. The striker joined Lanus last year.

Balvorin signed with Huracan for the 2010 Clausura tournament. For the 2010–11 season, Balvorín returned to Gimnasia y Esgrima de Jujuy.
