= Mauricio Yedro =

Argentine footballer

Personal information
- Full name: Mauricio José Yedro
- Date of birth: May 10, 1987 (age 39)
- Place of birth: Las Rosas, Argentina
- Height: 1.70 m (5 ft 7 in)
- Position: Midfielder

Team information
- Current team: Olmedo
- Number: 2

Youth career
- Gimnasia LP

Senior career*
Years	Team	Apps	(Gls)
2005–2008	Gimnasia LP	29	(0)
2008–2009	Defensa y Justicia	13	(0)
2009	→ M. Wanderers (loan)	9	(2)
2010–2011	Gimnasia de Jujuy	43	(2)
2011–2012	Santiago Morning	32	(3)
2012–2014	Huachipato	48	(2)
2014–2015	Deportes Iquique	31	(0)
2015–2017	Santiago Morning	24	(1)
2017	Fuerza Amarilla	38	(0)
2018–2019	Coquimbo Unido	41	(2)
2020	Santiago Morning	23	(1)
2021–	Olmedo	4	(0)
- * Club domestic league appearances and goals as of 16 December 2020

Mauricio José Yedro (born 10 May 1987) is an Argentine footballer which plays for Ecuadorian Serie A side Olmedo.

== Honours ==
Huachipato

- Primera División de Chile: 2012 Clausura

Coquimbo Unido

- Primera B de Chile: 2018
