= Rodrigo Acosta =

Argentine association football Forward

Personal information
- Full name: Rodrigo Damián Acosta
- Date of birth: May 5, 1990 (age 36)
- Place of birth: Lomas de Zamora Buenos Aires, Argentina
- Height: 1.74 m (5 ft 9 in)
- Position: Forward

Team information
- Current team: Central Norte
- Number: 11

Senior career*
Years	Team	Apps	(Gls)
2008–2011	Los Andes	33	(0)
2012	Deportes Concepción	0	(0)
2012–2013	Platense	21	(2)
2013–2014	Alvear FBC	–	(–)
2015–2019	Sacachispas	98	(18)
2019–2021	Almirante Brown	14	(1)
2021	→ Comunicaciones (loan)	33	(12)
2022	Los Chankas	18	(7)
2022–2023	Racing de Córdoba	15	(4)
2023	→ Juventud Las Piedras (loan)	12	(2)
2024	Olimpo	30	(10)
2025–	Central Norte	21	(2)
- * Club domestic league appearances and goals as of 17:06, 21 July 2025 (UTC)

Rodrigo Damián Acosta (born May 5, 1990) is an Argentine association football forward currently playing for Central Norte.

== Career ==
Acosta had played in his homeland for clubs such as Los Andes, Sacachispas and Almirante Brown.

Abroad, Acosta had stints with Deportes Concepción in Chile, Los Chankas in Peru and Juventud Las Piedras in Uruguay.

In 2025, Acosta joined Central Norte.
