= Mauricio Almada =

Argentine football left back (born 1976)

Personal information
- Full name: Mauricio Nicasio Almada
- Date of birth: August 18, 1976 (age 50)
- Place of birth: Lincoln, Argentina
- Height: 1.70 m (5 ft 7 in)
- Position: Left back

Team information
- Current team: Almirante Brown
- Number: 29

Senior career*
Years	Team	Apps	(Gls)
1998–1999	Sarmiento		
1999–2002	Gimnasia (CdU)		
2002–2006	Arsenal de Sarandí	63	(0)
2006–2008	Gimnasia (J)	47	(1)
2008–2009	Quilmes	37	(0)
2009–2012	Deportivo Merlo	111	(0)
2012–2014	Tristán Suárez	65	(0)
2014–	Almirante Brown	20	(0)
- * Club domestic league appearances and goals as of 17 March 2015

Mauricio Nicasio Almada (born 18 August 1976 in Lincoln, Buenos Aires) is an Argentine football left back currently playing for Almirante Brown.

== Career ==
Almada started his playing career in 1998 with Sarmiento and in 1999 he joined Gimnasia (CdU) where he played for three seasons in the Argentine 2nd division.

In 2002 Almada joined Arsenal de Sarandí of the Argentine Primera where he established himself as a regular starter. In 2006, he moved to Gimnasia y Esgrima de Jujuy.
