= Marcelo Quinteros =

Argentine footballer

Personal information
- Full name: Marcelo Nildo Quinteros
- Date of birth: 23 December 1976 (age 49)
- Place of birth: Cañada de Gómez, Argentina
- Height: 1.74 m (5 ft 9 in)
- Position: Right winger

Senior career*
Years	Team	Apps	(Gls)
2000–2003	Rosario Central	58	(4)
2003	Deportivo Cuenca	24	(1)
2004–2008	Gimnasia de Jujuy	143	(15)
2008–2009	San Martín de Tucumán	31	(2)
2009–2012	Banfield	111	(4)
2012–2013	Boca Unidos	24	(1)
- * Club domestic league appearances and goals

Marcelo Nildo Quinteros (born 23 December 1976 in Cañada de Gómez, Santa Fe) is an Argentine football midfielder.

Quinteros started his professional playing career in 2000 with Rosario Central. In 2003, he had a spell with Deportivo Cuenca in Ecuador before joining Gimnasia y Esgrima de Jujuy in 2004.

In 2005, Quinteros was part of the Gimnasia team that won the 2nd division Clausura 2005 and obtained promotion to the Argentine Primera.

In 2009, he joined Banfield after failing to prevent the relegation of his previous club, San Martín de Tucumán. He played in every game of the Apertura 2009 championship, helping Banfield to win the Argentine league championship for the first time in their history.

== Honours ==
Gimnasia y Esgrima de Jujuy

- Primera B Nacional: Clausura 2005

Banfield

- Primera División Argentina: Apertura 2009
