= Pablo Garnier =

Argentine footballer

Personal information
- Full name: Pablo Sebastián Garnier
- Date of birth: February 26, 1981 (age 45)
- Place of birth: San Salvador de Jujuy, Argentina
- Height: 1.74 m (5 ft 9 in)
- Positions: Right winger; second striker

Youth career
- 2001–2002: Gimnasia (J)

Senior career*
Years	Team	Apps	(Gls)
2002–2003	Gimnasia (J)	24	(4)
2003–2004	Quilmes	35	(4)
2004–2006	Libertad	57	(8)
2006–2008	Arsenal de Sarandí	62	(5)
2008–2009	Colón	7	(0)
2009	Defensa y Justicia	17	(1)
2010–2014	Quilmes	125	(5)
2014–2015	Atlético Tucumán	43	(1)
2016	Gimnasia (J)	15	(0)
2016–2017	Altos Hornos Zapla	15	(1)
2017	Juventud Antoniana	18	(1)
2019–2020	Atlético Bermejo		
- * Club domestic league appearances and goals as of 23:19, 9 October 2019 (UTC)

Pablo Sebastián Garnier (born 26 February 1981 in San Salvador de Jujuy, Jujuy Province) is an Argentine footballer, who plays as a right winger.

== Club career ==
Garnier started his career with Gimnasia y Esgrima de Jujuy in the Argentine 2nd Division. In 2003, he moved to Quilmes Atlético Club in the Primera Division.

Between 2004 and 2006 Garnier played for Club Libertad in Paraguay before returning to Argentina to play for Arsenal de Sarandí. In 2008, he transferred to Colón de Santa Fe where he played until June 2009; subsequently he signed with club Defensa y Justicia of the Argentine second division.

== Titles ==
Season	Club	Title
2007	Arsenal de Sarandí	Copa Sudamericana
