= Diego Reynoso =

Argentine footballer

Personal information
- Full name: Diego Alejandro Reynoso
- Date of birth: 1 November 1981 (age 45)
- Place of birth: Paraná, Entre Ríos, Argentina
- Height: 1.82 m (6 ft 0 in)
- Position: Centre-back

Youth career
- Colón

Senior career*
Years	Team	Apps	(Gls)
2003–2008	Colón	47	(1)
2005–2006	→ Atlético Rafaela (loan)	31	(1)
2008–2009	Atlético Tucumán	22	(0)
2009–2011	Olimpo	19	(0)
2011	Sarmiento de Resistencia	16	(1)
2012	Everton	23	(0)
2013–2014	Cobreloa	33	(2)
2014	C.A.I.	17	(0)
2015–2018	Atlético Paraná	97	(2)
Total		305	(5)
- * Club domestic league appearances and goals

Diego Alejandro Reynoso (born November 1, 1981, in Paraná (Entre Ríos), Argentina) is a former Argentine footballer who played as a centre-back for clubs in Argentina and Chile.

== Teams ==
- (Argentina) Colón de Santa Fe 2003-2005
- (Argentina) Atlético Rafaela (loan) 2005–2006
- (Argentina) Colón de Santa Fe 2006-2008
- (Argentina) Atlético Tucumán 2008–2009
- (Argentina) Olimpo de Bahía Blanca 2009–2010
- (Argentina) Sarmiento de Resistencia 2011
- (Chile) Everton 2012
- (Chile) Cobreloa 2013-2014
- (Argentina) C.A.I. 2014
- (Argentina) Atlético Paraná 2015-2018
