= Julio Moreyra =

Argentine footballer

Personal information
- Full name: Julio César Moreyra
- Date of birth: 10 August 1981 (age 45)
- Place of birth: Córdoba, Argentina
- Height: 1.90 m (6 ft 3 in)
- Position: Defender

Senior career*
Years	Team	Apps	(Gls)
2000–2009	Instituto de Córdoba		
2005–2006	→ U. de Chile (loan)		
2006	→ Quilmes (loan)		
2007–2008	→ Godoy Cruz (loan)		
2010	Indpte. Rivadavia		
2010	Patronato de Paraná		
2011–2012	San Martín de Porres		
2012–2013	Nueva Chicago		
2013–2014	Blooming		
2014	Instituto ACC		
2015	Olmedo		
2015–2016	Santiago Morning		
- * Club domestic league appearances and goals as of 21 March 2020

Julio César Moreyra (born 10 August 1981) is an Argentine former professional footballer who played as a centre-back.

Born in Córdoba, Argentina, he began his career with Instituto and later played professionally in Chile, Peru, Bolivia and Ecuador, in addition to several clubs in Argentina.

== Club career ==
Moreyra began his professional career with Instituto, making his first-team debut in the early 2000s. He became a regular for the Córdoba club and was part of the squad that earned promotion to the Argentine Primera División in 2004. He subsequently made 30 top-flight appearances for Instituto during the 2004–05 season.

=== Universidad de Chile ===
In July 2005, Moreyra moved to Chile to join Universidad de Chile on loan. Nicknamed El Indio, he quickly became a regular in the team's defence and a popular figure among supporters. He was one of the team's standout players during the 2005 Clausura, when Universidad de Chile reached the championship final against Universidad Católica.

Moreyra remained with Universidad de Chile for the 2006 Apertura and again reached the championship final, this time against Colo-Colo. He was a regular starter during both campaigns, as Universidad de Chile finished runner-up in consecutive tournaments. Moreyra later recalled that the club's financial difficulties prevented Universidad de Chile from purchasing his registration, bringing his spell in Santiago to an end after approximately one year.

=== Return to Argentina ===
After leaving Chile, Moreyra returned to Argentina and joined Quilmes, making 11 Primera División appearances in 2006. He subsequently returned to Instituto before moving on loan to Godoy Cruz in 2007. Moreyra became a regular at the Mendoza club, making 33 league appearances and scoring once during his spell there.

He returned to Instituto for the 2008–09 season before joining Independiente Rivadavia in 2010. Later that year, Moreyra signed for newly promoted Primera B Nacional side Patronato, moving alongside fellow Independiente Rivadavia player Gabriel Roth. He was used as a starting centre-back during Patronato's preparations for the season.

=== Late career ===
In 2011, Moreyra moved to Peru to play for Universidad de San Martín. He made 18 league appearances and also represented the club in the 2011 Copa Libertadores.

Moreyra returned to Argentina in 2012 with Nueva Chicago, making 19 appearances in the Primera B Nacional. In 2013, he moved to Bolivia to join Blooming, where he made 14 league appearances before returning to Instituto in 2014.

In 2015, Moreyra continued his career abroad with Ecuadorian club Olmedo before returning to Córdoba to represent Estudiantes de Río Cuarto. He returned to Chile in 2016, joining Santiago Morning in the Primera B. Moreyra made nine league appearances for the club.

During the final years of his career, Moreyra returned to football in Córdoba, representing Deportivo Colón and later General Paz Juniors. He continued playing into 2020, by which time he had returned to General Paz Juniors.

== Honors ==
=== Player ===
Universidad de Chile

- Primera División de Chile Runner-up (2): 2005–C, 2006–A
