= Damián Nieto =

Argentine footballer

Personal information
- Full name: Damián Pablo Nieto
- Date of birth: 24 March 1985 (age 41)
- Place of birth: Buenos Aires, Argentina
- Height: 1.90 m (6 ft 3 in)
- Position: Centre back

Youth career
- 2005: Almagro

Senior career*
Years	Team	Apps	(Gls)
2005–2006	Benfica B	20	(2)
2006–2008	Huracán	4	(0)
2008–2009	Almagro	21	(1)
2009–2010	Acassuso	29	(4)
2010–2011	Santiago Morning	17	(0)
Total		91	(7)
- * Club domestic league appearances and goals

Damián Pablo Nieto (born 24 April 1985 in Buenos Aires) is an Argentine former footballer who played as a centre-back.

== Teams ==
- (Portugal) Benfica B 2005–2006
- (Argentina) Huracán 2006–2008
- (Argentina) Almagro 2008–2009
- (Argentina) Acassuso 2009–2010
- (Chile) Santiago Morning 2010–2011
