= Ángel Puertas =

Argentine footballer

Personal information
- Full name: Ángel Maximiliano Puertas
- Date of birth: January 23, 1980 (age 46)
- Place of birth: Buenos Aires, Argentina
- Height: 1.75 m (5 ft 9 in)
- Position: Defender

Senior career*
Years	Team	Apps	(Gls)
1998–2000	San Lorenzo	2	(0)
2000–2002	Almagro	13	(0)
2002–2003	Belgrano	29	(2)
2003–2004	Los Andes	33	(2)
2004–2005	San Martín SJ	39	(2)
2006	Cobresal	13	(1)
2006–2007	Platense	38	(2)
2007–2008	Huracán	32	(0)
2008–2009	Independiente	7	(0)
2010	Tacuarembó	3	(0)
2011–2012	Platense	32	(2)
- * Club domestic league appearances and goals

Ángel Maximiliano Puertas (born 23 January 1980 in Buenos Aires) is an Argentine former football defender.

== Career ==
Besides Argentina, Puertas played abroad for Chilean club Cobresal in 2006 and Uruguayan club Tacuarembó in 2010.
