= Nicolás Gianni =

Argentine footballer

Personal information
- Full name: Nicolás Andrés Gianni
- Date of birth: 27 September 1982 (age 44)
- Place of birth: Villa Lugano, Argentina
- Height: 1.82 m (6 ft 0 in)
- Position: Striker

Youth career
- Argentinos Juniors

Senior career*
| Years | Team | Apps | (Gls) |
| 2000–2010 | Argentinos Juniors | 63 | (8) |
| 2004–2005 | → Defensores (loan) | 61 | (6) |
| 2008 | → U. Católica (loan) | 12 | (1) |
| 2010 | Manta | 28 | (2) |
| 2011 | Chacarita Juniors | 9 | (0) |
| 2011 | Estudiantes de Mérida | 16 | (2) |
| 2012–2013 | Crucero del Norte | 10 | (0) |
| 2013–2014 | AEK Kouklia | 1 | (0) |
| 2014 | Fenix de Pilar | 6 | (1) |
| 2014–2015 | Deportivo Coopsol | 2 | (0) |
| 2015 | Gimnasia y Tiro | 14 | (0) |
Medal record
Player
Argentinos Juniors
| Winner | Argentine Primera División | Clausura 2010 |
- * Club domestic league appearances and goals as of 18:31, 4 September 2022 (UTC)

Nicolás Andrés Gianni (born 27 September 1982 in Villa Lugano) is an Argentine footballer.

== Club career ==
Gianni started his career at Argentinos Juniors aged 18 in 2000, making his professional debut in a 1–0 loss against Rosario Central. In 2002, the club lost the category and was relegated to the Primera B Nacional (Second Division), however Argentinos re-gained their place in Primera División in 2004, but in the same season, he was loaned to Defensores de Belgrano, once playing in the Second Division.

In 2005, he returned to Argentinos, and in the next season, Gianni won experience in Primera División, scoring his first goal for this tournament against Banfield in the penultimate week of the Torneo de Clausura 2006. After his goal against Banfield, he again scored in the last week of the tournament, scoring the only goal of the match at the 53rd minute against Colón de Santa Fe. Despite his good performance in the Clausura, he only played two matches in the Torneo Apertura. During the season 2007 and the Clausura 2008, he was regular in the team, playing the majority of the games as a substitute and being titular on a few occasions.

On 26 June 2008, Gianni was loaned to the Chilean team Universidad Católica. He arrived at the precordilleran club with the mission of replacing his countrymen Darío Bottinelli. He was also recommended to the coach Fernando Carvallo by the former footballer Jorge Quinteros, who had a great pass in this team in 2005. Quinteros, including talking with Gianni and was very eager to play for Católica, affirmed the former striker of the UC. He made his official debut for the club as a starter in a 4–1 win over Unión Española, being substituted at the 83rd minute.

== Honours ==
Argentinos Juniors

- Argentine Primera División (1): Clausura 2010
