= Gastón Machín =

Argentine footballer

Personal information
- Full name: Gastón Machín
- Date of birth: February 20, 1983 (age 43)
- Place of birth: Del Viso, Argentina
- Height: 1.74 m (5 ft 9 in)
- Positions: Right midfielder; centre midfielder

Youth career
- Argentinos Juniors

Senior career*
Years	Team	Apps	(Gls)
2002–2005	Argentinos Juniors	110	(7)
2006–2009	Independiente	73	(3)
2008–2009	→ Newell's Old Boys (loan)	15	(0)
2010–2012	Huracán	72	(6)
2012–2014	Patronato	54	(3)
2014–2016	Instituto	61	(0)
2016–2019	Argentinos Juniors	55	(1)
2019	Burgos	5	(0)
- * Club domestic league appearances and goals

Gastón Machín (born 20 February 1983) is an Argentine retired professional footballer who played as a midfielder.

== Career ==
Machín is a product of the famous youth system at Argentinos Juniors, he made his senior debut for the club in 2002. In 2004, he was part of the squad that earned promotion to the Argentine Primera.

Machín played for Argentinos in the Primera until the end of 2005 when he signed for Independiente for the beginning of the Clausura 2006 tournament.

Machin was loaned to Newell's Old Boys but the club did not respect some issues with the contract in terms of money and Machin decided to go back to Independiente for the 2009 season.

In January 2010 Club Atlético Huracán signed the midfielder on loan for one year, with an option of deal extension and purchase.

On 26 June 2019 it was confirmed, that Machín had joined Spanish Segunda División B club Burgos CF on a 1-year contract. However, he announced his retirement on 12 January 2020.
