= Diego Herner =

Argentine footballer

Personal information
- Full name: Diego Armando Herner
- Date of birth: 31 July 1983 (age 43)
- Place of birth: Gualeguaychú, Argentina
- Height: 1.86 m (6 ft 1 in)
- Position: Centre-back

Youth career
- Gimnasia LP

Senior career*
Years	Team	Apps	(Gls)
2001–2007	Gimnasia LP	109	(5)
2007–2008	Banfield	31	(1)
2008	Huracán	17	(1)
2009–2010	Cerro Porteño	47	(2)
2010–2011	San Lorenzo	11	(0)
2011–2012	Las Palmas	29	(0)
2012–2015	Independiente Medellín	94	(3)
2016–2018	América de Cali	74	(3)
2019	Alvarado	16	(2)
2019–2020	Guillermo Brown	15	(0)
- * Club domestic league appearances and goals

Diego Armando Herner (born 31 July 1983, in Gualeguaychú in Entre Ríos) is a retired Argentine footballer, who played as a centre-back.

Herner started his career in 2001 with Gimnasia LP, where he made over 100 appearances before moving to Banfield in July 2007.
