= Matías Escobar =

Argentine footballer (born 1982)

Personal information
- Full name: Matías Leonardo Escobar
- Date of birth: April 21, 1982 (age 44)
- Place of birth: Rosario, Argentina
- Height: 1.85 m (6 ft 1 in)
- Position: Defensive midfielder

Youth career
- –2003: Rosario Central

Senior career*
| Years | Team | Apps | (Gls) |
| 2004–2008 | Gimnasia L.P. | 129 | (6) |
| 2008–2010 | Kayserispor | 3 | (0) |
| 2009 | → Rosario Central (loan) | 14 | (0) |
| 2009 | → Atlético Tucumán (loan) | 13 | (1) |
| 2010–2011 | Doxa Katokopia FC | 17 | (1) |
| 2011 | Enosis Neon Paralimni | 7 | (0) |
| 2011–2013 | Tigre | 29 | (1) |
| 2013–2016 | Boca Unidos | 96 | (8) |
| 2016–2017 | Quilmes | 19 | (0) |
| 2017–2018 | Los Andes | 14 | (0) |
- * Club domestic league appearances and goals as of 14:57, 14 October 2019 (UTC)

Matías Leonardo Escobar (born April 21, 1982) is an Argentine football midfielder who most recently played for Club Atletico Los Andes in the Primera B Nacional.

== Career ==
Escobar started his professional career in 2004 with Gimnasia y Esgrima de La Plata where he made over 100 appearances. In 2008, he joined Kayserispor but returned to Argentina on loan to Rosario Central in 2009. In August 2009, he was loaned to Atlético Tucumán
