= Federico Nieto =

Argentine footballer (born 1983)

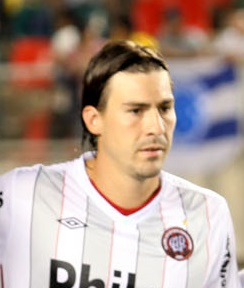
- Nieto in 2012

Personal information
- Full name: Federico Nieto
- Date of birth: 26 August 1983 (age 43)
- Place of birth: Buenos Aires, Argentina
- Height: 1.90 m (6 ft 3 in)
- Position: Striker

Team information
- Current team: Barcelona SC
- Number: 32

Senior career*
Years	Team	Apps	(Gls)
2002–2006	Almagro	58	(33)
2005	→Rangers (loan)	3	(2)
2006	→Estrela Amadora (loan)	7	(1)
2006	Genoa	0	(0)
2006–2007	→Hellas Verona (loan)	21	(1)
2007–2008	Huracán	32	(7)
2008–2009	Banfield	8	(0)
2009	→ Huracán (loan)	15	(5)
2009–2010	Colon	31	(13)
2010–2012	Atlético Paranaense	31	(5)
2013–2014	Deportivo Quito	35	(28)
2014–2015	Barcelona SC	16	(3)
2015–2016	Católica	13	(1)
2016–2017	Boca Unidos	11	(3)
- * Club domestic league appearances and goals as of 7 May 2015

Federico Gastón Nieto (born 26 August 1983) is a retired Argentine professional footballer who played as a striker.

== Career ==
Nieto was born in Buenos Aires. He previously played for Almagro, with a loan spell at Scottish club Rangers in 2005 where he scored three times, once in the league against Dunfermline and twice against Clyde in the League Cup.

In 2007, Nieto returned to Argentina to play for Huracán, in 2008 he joined Banfield and in January 2009 he was loaned back to Huracán where he was a member of the squad that finished in 2nd place in the Clausura 2009 tournament.

In 2009, he joined Colón de Santa Fe where he started well with four goals in his first six games with the club.

Since 2010, he has been playing in Atlético Paranaense where, after a comparatively worse 2010 season, he became one of the most important players of the team in 2011, scoring seven goals at a total of seven games played.
