= René Lima =

Argentine footballer

Personal information
- Full name: René Martín Lima
- Date of birth: January 3, 1985 (age 41)
- Place of birth: Vicente López, Argentina
- Height: 1.80 m (5 ft 11 in)
- Position: Midfielder

Team information
- Current team: Comunicaciones

Youth career
- River Plate

Senior career*
Years	Team	Apps	(Gls)
2003–2007	River Plate	45	(0)
2008	Maccabi Haifa	9	(0)
2008	Gimnasia LP	3	(0)
2009	Gimnasia de Jujuy	1	(0)
2009	Argentinos Juniors	0	(0)
2010	Fénix	9	(1)
2010–2011	Instituto	35	(0)
2011–2012	Independiente Rivadavia	27	(0)
2012–2014	Cobreloa	62	(3)
2014–2015	Unión Española	33	(1)
2016	Murciélagos	7	(0)
2017	Sportivo Rivadavia	9	(0)
2018	Sportivo Italiano	15	(0)
2018	Douglas Haig	11	(0)
2019	C.A.I.	15	(1)
2021	Jorge Newbery	2	(0)
2021	San Telmo	8	(1)
2022–	Comunicaciones	19	(1)

International career
2004–2006	Argentina U-20	8	(0)
- * Club domestic league appearances and goals as of 14:51, 1 August 2022 (UTC)

René Martín Lima (born 3 January 1985 in Vicente López, Buenos Aires) is an Argentine footballer, who plays as a midfielder for Comunicaciones.

== Career ==
Lima made his debut for River Plate on 23 November 2003, in a 1–0 defeat by Chacarita Juniors. He has also played for Maccabi Haifa of Israel, Gimnasia de La Plata and Gimnasia de Jujuy.

In 2009, he was signed by Argentinos Juniors.

== Honours ==
Season	Club	Title
Clausura 2004	River Plate	Primera Division Argentina
