= Gabriel González (Argentine footballer) =

Argentine footballer (born 1980)

Personal information
- Full name: Gabriel Horacio González
- Date of birth: 20 November 1980 (age 45)
- Place of birth: General Gelly, Santa Fe, Argentina
- Height: 1.69 m (5 ft 7 in)
- Position: Forward

Senior career*
Years	Team	Apps	(Gls)
2000–2003	Douglas Haig	40	(18)
2003–2007	Huracán TA	95	(20)
2007–2009	Godoy Cruz	19	(3)
2008	→ Atlético Tucumán (loan)	0	(0)
2009	→ Santiago Wanderers (loan)	30	(5)
2010–2013	Douglas Haig	102	(24)
2013–2014	Unión Mar del Plata	24	(4)
2014	General Rojo UD	13	(5)
2015	Unión Villa Krause	26	(12)
2016	Sarmiento de Resistencia	6	(0)
2016–2017	Unión Villa Krause	17	(2)
2017–2018	Desamparados	11	(1)
2019–2021	Sportivo Peñarol	14	(0)
2022–2023	San Miguel Albardón	–	(–)
- * Club domestic league appearances and goals

Gabriel Horacio González (born November 13, 1980) is an Argentine former professional footballer who played as a forward.

== Teams ==
- (Argentina) Douglas Haig 2000–2003
- (Argentina) Huracán de Tres Arroyos 2003–2007
- (Argentina) Godoy Cruz 2007–2008
- (Argentina) Atlético Tucumán 2008
- (Chile) Santiago Wanderers 2009
- (Argentina) Douglas Haig 2010–2013
- (Argentina) Unión Mar del Plata 2013–2014
- (Argentina) General Rojo Unión Deportiva 2014
- (Argentina) Unión Villa Krause 2015
- (Argentina) Sarmiento de Resistencia 2016
- (Argentina) Unión Villa Krause 2016–2017
- (Argentina) Desamparados 2017–2018
- (Argentina) Sportivo Peñarol 2019–2021
- (Argentina) San Miguel de Albardón 2022–2023

== Titles ==
- (Argentina) Huracán de Tres Arroyos 2004-2005 (Primera B Nacional Championship)
- (Argentina) Godoy Cruz 2007-2008 (Primera B Nacional Championship)
- (Argentina) Douglas Haig 2009-2010 (Torneo Argentino B Championship)
