= Marcos Ramírez (footballer) =

Argentine footballer

Personal information
- Full name: Marcos Ramírez
- Date of birth: April 25, 1983 (age 43)
- Place of birth: Avellaneda, Argentina
- Height: 1.87 m (6 ft 2 in)
- Position: Defender

Team information
- Current team: Defensa y Justicia

Senior career*
Years	Team	Apps	(Gls)
2003–2006	Defensa y Justicia	36	(2)
2006	Independiente	0	(0)
2007	Gimnasia de La Plata	1	(0)
2007–2008	Independiente	2	(0)
2008	? Godoy Cruz (loan)	1	(0)
2009	? Chacarita Juniors (loan)		
2009–	Defensa y Justicia		
- * Club domestic league appearances and goals as of 23 January 2009

Marcos Ramírez (born 25 April 1983 in Avellaneda) is an Argentine football defender. He currently plays for Defensa y Justicia.
