= Alejandro Limia =

Argentine footballer (born 1975)

Personal information
- Full name: Oscar Alejandro Limia Rodríguez
- Date of birth: July 16, 1975 (age 51)
- Place of birth: Avellaneda, Argentina
- Height: 1.84 m (6 ft 0 in)
- Position: Goalkeeper

Senior career*
Years	Team	Apps	(Gls)
1997–1998	Lanús	0	(0)
1998–1999	Badajoz	0	(0)
1999–2000	Sarandí	16	(0)
2000–2001	Lanús	0	(0)
2001–2005	Sarandí	136	(0)
2005–2008	Cádiz	25	(0)
2008	→ Huracán (loan)	17	(0)
2009	América de Cali	25	(0)
2010–2013	Unión	81	(0)
2013–2015	Sarandí	12	(0)
Total		312	(0)
- * Club domestic league appearances and goals

Oscar Alejandro Limia Rodríguez (born 16 July 1975 in Avellaneda, Buenos Aires, Argentina) is a retired Argentine footballer. His career began in 1997 and ended in 2015.

== Career ==
He began his career as a professional goalkeeper in 1997 playing for Lanús, but he has spent most of his career in Argentina playing for Arsenal de Sarandí, whose fans still hold him in high esteem. In February 2009 he was signed by Colombian side América de Cali. In January 2010, however, he returned to Argentina to play for Unión de Santa Fe. His last team was Arsenal de Sarandí.
