= Matías Manrique =

Argentine footballer

Personal information
- Full name: Matías Eduardo Manrique
- Date of birth: 1 November 1980 (age 46)
- Place of birth: Mendoza, Argentina
- Height: 1.87 m (6 ft 2 in)
- Position: Defender

Senior career*
Years	Team	Apps	(Gls)
2000–2005	Independiente	31	(1)
2002–2004	→ Arsenal de Sarandí (loan)	33	(0)
2006	Danubio	10	(0)
2007–2008	Peñarol	18	(3)
2008	Huracán	–	(–)
2009	Chacarita Juniors	0	(0)
2009	Huracán SR	–	(–)
2009	Argentino de Mendoza	–	(–)
2010	Ñublense	6	(0)
2011	Gutiérrez	–	(–)
2011	Leonardo Murialdo	–	(–)
2012–2013	Andes Talleres	21	(1)
2013–2014	Leonardo Murialdo	16	(1)
2014	Deportivo Maipú	6	(1)
2015	Leonardo Murialdo	–	(–)
- * Club domestic league appearances and goals

Matías Eduardo Manrique (born 1 November 1980, in Mendoza) is an Argentine former football defender.

== Club career ==
Manrique started his professional playing career in 2001 with Independiente. He played for Arsenal de Sarandí between 2002 and 2004, when he returned to Independiente.

In 2006 Manrique joined Uruguayan team Danubio and in 2007 he joined Peñarol where he was part of the squad that won the Clausura 2008 tournament.

In 2010, Manrique joined Chilean club Ñublense from Argentino de Mendoza.

His last clubs were Deportivo Maipú and Leonardo Murialdo.

== Titles ==
Season	Team	Title
Clausura 2008	Peñarol	Primera División Uruguaya
