= Maximiliano Badell =

Argentine footballer

Personal information
- Full name: Maximiliano Alberto Badell
- Date of birth: 12 January 1998 (age 28)
- Place of birth: La Plata, Argentina
- Height: 1.66 m (5 ft 5 in)
- Position: Midfielder

Team information
- Current team: Villa San Carlos

Senior career*
Years	Team	Apps	(Gls)
2008–2010	Estudiantes		
2008	→ CA Platense (loan)	10	(1)
2010	CA San Telmo		
2010	Provincial Osorno	8	(1)
2010–2011	C.S. Herediano	8	(0)
2011–2012	Central Córdoba SdE		
2012–2013	Villa Dálmine	20	(1)
2013–2014	Cambaceres		
2014–2016	Guillermo Brown	31	(7)
2016	CA San Telmo		
2016–2017	Fénix	31	(4)
2017–2018	Villa San Carlos	23	(2)
2018–2020	Talleres (RE)	41	(6)
2019–2020	Gimnasia y Esgrima	8	(0)
2020–2021	Comunicaciones	6	(0)
2021–	Villa San Carlos	56	(5)
- * Club domestic league appearances and goals as of 29 December 2022 (UTC)

Maximiliano Alberto Badell (born August 29, 1988, in La Plata, Argentina) is an Argentine professional footballer currently playing for in the Primera B Metropolitana club Villa San Carlos.
