= Maximiliano Timpanaro =

Argentine footballer

Personal information
- Full name: Maximiliano Timpanaro
- Date of birth: March 23, 1988 (age 38)
- Place of birth: Azul, Buenos Aires Province, Argentina
- Position: Forward

Team information
- Current team: ASD Stintino

Senior career*
| Years | Team | Apps | (Gls) |
| 2006–2010 | Vélez Sársfield | | |
| 2008–2009 | → Chacarita Juniors (loan) | 2 | (0) |
| 2010 | → Dinamo Tirana (loan) | 11 | (2) |
| 2010–2011 | AS Béziers | 23 | (7) |
| 2011–2012 | Gandía | 5 | (0) |
| 2012– | Santamarina | 43 | (8) |
- * Club domestic league appearances and goals as of 25 May 2015

Maximiliano 'Timpa' Timpanaro (born 23 March 1988, in Azul, Buenos Aires Province) is an Argentine footballer who currently plays as a striker for ASD Stintino in Itália.
