= Federico Poggi =

Argentine footballer

Personal information
- Full name: Federico Hernán Poggi
- Date of birth: 10 January 1981 (age 45)
- Place of birth: Buenos Aires, Argentina
- Height: 1.64 m (5 ft 5 in)
- Position: Left winger

Team information
- Current team: Villa Dálmine

Senior career*
Years	Team	Apps	(Gls)
2001–2004	San Telmo	102	(12)
2004–2005	Sarmiento	29	(2)
2005–2008	Huracán	92	(2)
2008	AC Ajaccio	8	(0)
2009–2010	Arsenal de Sarandí	39	(0)
2010–2015	San Martín de San Juan	113	(6)
2015–	Villa Dálmine	6	(0)
- * Club domestic league appearances and goals as of 04:45, 23 September 2010 (UTC)

Federico Hernán Poggi (born 10 January 1981) is an Argentine football midfielder who plays for Villa Dálmine.

== Career ==
Poggi began his playing career in 2001 for San Telmo of the regionalised 3rd division of Argentine football. In 2004, he moved up a division to join Sarmiento de Junín of the Primera B Nacional.

In 2005 Poggi joined Huracán and in 2007 the club attained promotion to the Primera División. Between 2007 and 2008 Poggi played 39 games for Huracán in the Primera División.

After a brief spell in France with AC Ajaccio in 2008, Poggi returned to Argentina to join Arsenal de Sarandí.
