= Gonzalo Robledo =

Argentine footballer

Gonzalo Robledo (born January 18, 1987, in Laferrere, Argentina) is an Argentine footballer.

== Teams ==
- (Argentina) Banfield 2006–2010
- River Plate Puerto Rico 2010
- (Peru) Unión Comercio 2011-2012
