= Enzo Bruno =

Argentine footballer (born 1987)

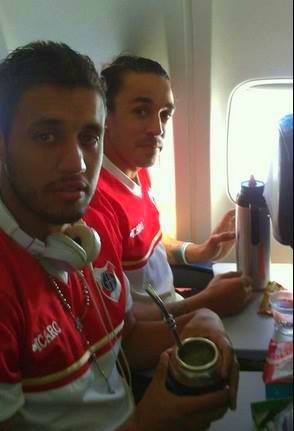

Personal information
- Full name: Enzo Alejandro Bruno
- Date of birth: March 19, 1987 (age 39)
- Place of birth: San Ignacio, Argentina
- Height: 1.70 m (5 ft 7 in)
- Position: Attacking midfielder

Team information
- Current team: Chaco For Ever

Youth career
- Independiente

Senior career*
Years	Team	Apps	(Gls)
2007–2009	Independiente	20	(0)
2008	→ San Martín T. (loan)	11	(1)
2010	Unirea Alba Iulia	16	(0)
2010–2011	Aldosivi	7	(0)
2011	Mixto		
2011–2012	Guaraní Antonio Franco	22	(4)
2012–2014	Crucero del Norte	66	(2)
2014–2016	Guaraní Antonio Franco	37	(2)
2016	Fuerza Amarilla	11	(2)
2017–2019	Crucero del Norte	51	(3)
2019	Sporting Santo Pipó	8	(6)
2020–2021	Guaraní Antonio Franco	7	(1)
2021–	Chaco For Ever	66	(4)
- * Club domestic league appearances and goals as of 18:56, 2 September 2023 (UTC)

Enzo Alejandro Bruno (born 19 March 1987 in San Ignacio, Misiones) is an Argentine footballer, who plays as a midfielder for Chaco For Ever in Argentina.
