= Claudio Enría =

Argentine footballer

Personal information
- Full name: Claudio Marcelo Enría
- Date of birth: August 28, 1973 (age 53)
- Place of birth: San Justo, Argentina
- Height: 1.77 m (5 ft 9 1/2 in)
- Position: Striker

Senior career*
Years	Team	Apps	(Gls)
1992–1993	Newell's Old Boys	24	(1)
1993–1998	Lanús	75	(12)
1998	Sevilla FC	14	(2)
1998–1999	Belgrano	36	(8)
1999–2000	Colón	33	(8)
2000–2003	Gimnasia La Plata	102	(30)
2003–2004	CD Leganés	34	(5)
2004–2005	Gimnasia La Plata	30	(10)
2005–2006	Vélez Sársfield	27	(5)
2006–2008	Colón	47	(6)
- * Club domestic league appearances and goals as of 22:16, 24 April 2009 (UTC)

Claudio Marcelo Enría (born 28 August 1973 in San Justo, Santa Fe) is a former Argentine football striker who most recently played for Colón de Santa Fe.

Enría started his career in 1992 with Newell's Old Boys, after only one season with the club he left to play for Club Atlético Lanús.

In 1998, Enría joined Sevilla FC in Spain, but it didn't work out for him and he returned to Argentina later that year to play for Belgrano de Córdoba.

In 1999, Enría had his first spell with Colón but he left the club to join Gimnasia y Esgrima La Plata in 2000.

In 2003, Enría made a second attempt to play in Spain with CD Leganés but after only one season with the club he returned to Gimnasia y Esgrima La Plata.

In 2005, he joined Vélez Sársfield and in 2006 he rejoined Colón.
