= 2006–07 in Argentine football =

Football in Argentina
- Season: 2006–07

2006–07 season of Argentine football was the 116th season of competitive football in Argentina.

== Torneo Apertura ("Opening" Tournament) ==
=== "Championship" playoff ===
Boca Juniors and Estudiantes de La Plata ended up tied in points at the end of the 19 weeks of regular season. Tournament rules establish that, unlike any other position on the table, if two or more teams are equal in points at the end of play, goal difference does not count and a playoff game is required. Estudiantes won that match and was crowned as champion.

Date	Venue	Opponents	Score
December 13, 2006	Estadio José Amalfitani	Boca Juniors vs. Estudiantes de La Plata	1 – 2

Position	Team	Points	Played	Won	Drawn	Lost	For	Against	Difference
1	Estudiantes de La Plata	44	19	14	2	3	35	12	+23
2	Boca Juniors	44	19	14	2	3	41	17	+24
3	River Plate	38	19	11	5	3	33	17	+16
4	Independiente	32	19	10	2	7	33	24	+9
5	Arsenal	32	19	9	5	5	26	22	+4
6	Lanús	31	19	9	4	6	26	24	0
7	Vélez Sársfield	30	19	8	6	5	25	18	+7
8	Rosario Central	28	19	8	4	7	28	22	+6
9	San Lorenzo	28	19	8	4	7	30	33	-3
10	Racing Club	26	19	7	5	7	22	19	+3
11	Gimnasia de Jujuy	26	19	8	2	9	19	19	0
12	Belgrano	23	19	6	5	8	18	24	-6
13	Gimnasia de La Plata	23	19	7	2	10	21	40	-19
14	Nueva Chicago	22	19	6	4	9	20	32	-12
15	Banfield	20	19	4	8	7	21	26	-5
16	Argentinos Juniors	20	19	5	5	9	22	28	-6
17	Colón de Santa Fe	18	19	5	3	11	20	34	-14
18	Godoy Cruz	17	19	3	8	8	19	26	-7
19	Newell's Old Boys	16	19	3	7	9	21	28	-7
20	Quilmes	9	19	2	3	14	23	38	-15

=== Top scorers ===
Position	Player	Team	Goals
1	Rodrigo Palacio	Boca Juniors	12
1	Mauro Zárate	Vélez Sársfield	12
3	Óscar Cardozo	Newell's Old Boys	11
3	Martín Palermo	Boca Juniors	11
3	Mariano Pavone	Estudiantes de La Plata	11
6	Federico Higuaín	Nueva Chicago	10
6	Daniel Montenegro	Independiente	10
8	Claudio Graf	Lanús	9
8	Santiago Silva	Gimnasia de La Plata	9
10	Gonzalo Higuaín	River Plate	8
10	Leonel Núñez	Argentinos Juniors	8
10	Facundo Sava	Racing Club	8
10	Néstor Silvera	San Lorenzo	8

=== Relegation ===
There is no relegation after the Apertura. For the relegation results of this tournament see below.

== Torneo Clausura ("Closing" Tournament) ==
By matchday 8th, seven coaches were already fired by their respective teams

Position	Team	Points	Played	Won	Drawn	Lost	For	Against	Difference
1	San Lorenzo	45	19	14	3	2	34	17	+17
2	Boca Juniors	39	19	11	6	2	38	20	+18
3	Estudiantes de La Plata	37	19	10	7	2	28	17	+11
4	River Plate	33	19	9	6	4	26	17	+9
5	Arsenal	30	19	8	6	5	31	24	+7
6	Lanús	28	19	7	7	5	24	19	+5
7	Colón de Santa Fe	28	19	7	7	5	28	24	+4
8	Argentinos Juniors	26	19	6	8	5	21	17	+4
9	Vélez Sársfield	26	19	7	5	7	22	26	-4
10	Godoy Cruz	25	19	7	4	8	24	22	+2
11	Independiente	25	19	6	7	6	23	24	-1
12	Rosario Central	24	19	7	3	9	17	21	-4
13	Racing Club	23	19	5	8	6	28	30	-2
14	Newell's Old Boys	22	19	6	4	9	22	30	-8
15	Nueva Chicago	21	19	5	6	8	19	28	-9
16	Banfield	19	19	5	4	10	22	30	-8
17	Belgrano	18	19	4	6	9	24	27	-3
18	Gimnasia de La Plata	17	19	4	5	10	19	28	-9
19	Gimnasia de Jujuy	17	19	4	5	10	11	22	-11
20	Quilmes	12	19	3	3	13	18	36	-18

=== Top scorers ===
Position	Player	Team	Goals
1	Martín Palermo	Boca Juniors	11
2	Óscar Cardozo	Newell's Old Boys	10
3	Gastón Fernández	San Lorenzo	9
4	Facundo Sava	Racing Club	8
4	Darío Cvitanich	Banfield	8
5	Carlos Luna	Quilmes	7
5	Rodrigo Palacio	Boca Juniors	7
5	Mariano Pavone	Estudiantes de La Plata	7
5	José Sand	Colón de Santa Fe	7

=== Relegation ===
Team	Average	Points	Played	2004–05	2005–06	2006–07
Boca Juniors	1.877	214	114	48/38	83/38	83/38
Estudiantes de La Plata	1.701	194	114	61/38	52/38	81/38
River Plate	1.693	193	114	60/38	62/38	71/38
Vélez Sársfield	1.640	187	114	73/38	58/38	56/38
San Lorenzo	1.587	181	114	52/38	56/38	73/38
Lanús	1.500	171	114	54/38	58/38	59/38
Gimnasia de La Plata	1.429	163	114	54/38	69/38	40/38
Independiente	1.412	161	114	49/38	55/38	57/38
Arsenal de Sarandí	1.403	160	114	54/38	44/38	62/38
Rosario Central	1.386	158	114	61/38	45/38	52/38
Banfield	1.377	157	114	59/38	59/38	39/38
Racing Club	1.324	151	114	58/38	44/38	49/38
Newell's Old Boys	1.307	149	114	60/38	51/38	38/38
Colón de Santa Fe	1.271	145	114	53/38	46/38	46/38
Gimnasia de Jujuy	1.236	94	76	N/A	51/38	43/38
Argentinos Juniors	1.219	139	114	43/38	50/38	46/38
Nueva Chicago	1.131	43	38	N/A	N/A	43/38
Godoy Cruz	1.105	42	38	N/A	N/A	42/38
Belgrano de Córdoba	1.079	41	38	N/A	N/A	41/38
Quilmes	0.912	104	113	44/38	39/38	21/38

==== "Promoción" playoff ====
Teams and schedules will be decided based on average after the end of the Closing tournament.

Date	Home	Away	Result
June 21, 2007	Tigre	Nueva Chicago	1-0
June 25, 2007	Nueva Chicago	Tigre	1-2

Tigre wins 3-1 and is promoted to Argentine First Division. While Nueva Chicago is relegated to the Argentine Nacional B.

Date	Home	Away	Result
June 20, 2007	Huracán	Godoy Cruz	2-0
June 24, 2007	Godoy Cruz	Huracán	2-3

Huracán wins 5-2 and is promoted to Argentine First Division. While Godoy Cruz is relegated to the Argentine Nacional B.

== Lower leagues ==
Level	Tournament	Champion	Promoted	Relegated
2nd	Primera B Nacional Apertura; Primera B Nacional Clausura	Olimpo; Olimpo	Olimpo; Tigre; San Martín (SJ); Huracán	Villa Mitre; Huracán (TA)
3rd	Primera B Metropolitana Apertura; Primera B Metropolitana Clausura	Estudiantes de Buenos Aires; Almirante Brown	Almirante Brown	El Porvenir
3rd (Interior)	Torneo Argentino A Apertura; Torneo Argentino A Clausura	Sportivo Desamparados; Guillermo Brown	Independiente Rivadavia de Mendoza	Douglas Haig, Central Norte; San Martín de Mendoza
4th	Primera C Metropolitana Apertura; Primera C Metropolitana Clausura	Acassuso; Acassuso	Acassuso	Ituzaingó
4th (interior)	Torneo Argentino B		Libertad; Cipolletti; Boca Unidos	Candelaria, Centenario; Alianza (CC), Sportivo; Huracán (CR), Sarmiento (R); Atlético Uruguay
5th	Primera D Metropolitana Apertura; Primera D Metropolitana Clausura	Berazategui; L.N. Alem	L.N. Alem	Centro Español

== Clubs in international competitions ==
Team / Competition	2006 Recopa Sudamericana	2006 Copa Sudamericana	2007 Copa Libertadores
Boca Juniors	Champions defeated (Brazil) São Paulo	Round of 16 eliminated by (Uruguay) Nacional Montevideo	Champions defeated (Brazil) Grêmio
Lanús	Did not play	Quarterfinal eliminated by (Mexico) C.F. Pachuca	did not qualify
San Lorenzo	Did not play	Quarterfinal eliminated by (Mexico) Toluca	did not qualify
Vélez Sársfield	Did not play	First stage eliminated by (Argentina) Lanús	Round of 16 eliminated by (Argentina) Boca Juniors
River Plate	Did not play	Round of 16 eliminated by (Brazil) Paranaense	Second stage eliminated (finished last in the group)
Gimnasia La Plata	Did not play	Quarterfinals eliminated by (Chile) Colo-Colo	Second stage eliminated (finished 3rd in the group)
Banfield	Did not play	First stage eliminated by (Argentina) San Lorenzo	Second stage eliminated (finished 3rd in the group)

== National team ==
This section covers Argentina's matches from the end of the 2006 FIFA World Cup until the end of the 2007 Copa América.

Win Draw Loss

=== Friendly matches ===
September 3, 2006	Argentina	0 – 3	Brazil	London, England
15:00 UTC±0		(Report)	Elano 3', 67'; Kaká 89'	Stadium: Emirates Stadium; Attendance: 59,032; Referee: Steve Bennett (England)

October 12, 2006	Spain	2 – 1	Argentina	Murcia, Spain
21:00 UTC+01	Xavi 33'; Villa 63' (pen.)	(Report)	Bilos 34'	Stadium: Estadio Nueva Condomina; Attendance: 31,000; Referee: Laurent Duhamel (France)

February 7, 2007	France	0 – 1	Argentina	Saint-Denis, France
20:00 UTC+01		(Report)	Saviola 15'	Stadium: Stade de France; Attendance: 79,000; Referee: Damir Skomina (Slovenia)

April 18, 2007	Argentina	0 – 0	Chile	Mendoza, Argentina
21:30 UTC−03		(Report)		Stadium: Estadio Malvinas Argentinas

June 2, 2007	Switzerland	1 – 1	Argentina	Basel, Switzerland
19:30 UTC+01	Barnetta 63'	(Report)	Tevez 49'	Stadium: St. Jakob-Park

June 5, 2007	Argentina	4 – 3	Algeria	Barcelona, Spain
20:00 UTC+01	Tevez 1' (pen.); Messi 55' (pen.), 74'; Cambiasso 57'	(Report)	Yahia 10'; Belhadj 43', 75'	Stadium: Camp Nou; Attendance: 12,000; Referee: Alfonso J. Álvarez Izquierdo (Spain)

=== 2007 Copa América ===
June 28, 2007 Group stage	Argentina	4 – 1	United States	Maracaibo, Venezuela
20:50 UTC−04:30	Crespo 11', 60'; Aimar 76'; Tevez 84'	(Report)	Johnson 9' (pen.)	Stadium: Estadio José Pachencho Romero; Attendance: 34,500; Referee: Carlos Chandía (Chile)

July 2, 2007 Group stage	Argentina	4 – 2	Colombia	Maracaibo, Venezuela
20:50 UTC−04:30	Crespo 20' (pen.); Riquelme 34', 45'; D. Milito 90+1'	(Report)	E. Perea 10'; Castrillón 76'	Stadium: Estadio José Pachencho Romero; Attendance: 40,000; Referee: Carlos Simon (Brazil)

July 5, 2007 Group stage	Argentina	1 – 0	Paraguay	Barquisimeto, Venezuela
20:50 UTC−04:30	Mascherano 79'	(Report)		Stadium: Estadio Metropolitano de Fútbol de Lara; Attendance: 37,500; Referee: Jorge Larrionda (Uruguay)

July 8, 2007 Quarter-finals	Argentina	4 – 0	Peru	Barquisimeto, Venezuela
18:50 UTC−04:30	Riquelme 47', 85'; Messi 61'; Mascherano 75'	(Report)		Stadium: Estadio Metropolitano de Fútbol de Lara; Attendance: 38,800; Referee: Carlos Simon (Brazil)

July 11, 2007 Semi-finals	Mexico	0 – 3	Argentina	Puerto Ordaz, Venezuela
20:50 UTC−04:30		(Report)	Heinze 45'; Messi 61'; Riquelme 65' (pen.)	Stadium: Polideportivo Cachamay; Attendance: 41,600; Referee: Carlos Chandía (Chile)

July 15, 2007 Final	Brazil	3 – 0	Argentina	Maracaibo, Venezuela
17:05 UTC−04:30	Baptista 4'; Ayala 40' (o.g.); Alves 69'	(Report)		Stadium: Estadio José Pachencho Romero; Attendance: 40,000; Referee: Carlos Amarilla (Paraguay)
