= Daniel Carou =

Argentine footballer (born 1984)

Personal information
- Full name: Daniel Alberto Carou
- Date of birth: 27 June 1984 (age 42)
- Place of birth: Allen, Argentina
- Height: 1.73 m (5 ft 8 in)
- Position: Midfielder

Senior career*
Years	Team	Apps	(Gls)
2005–2006	Deportivo Roca		
2006–2008	Cipolletti	62	(10)
2008–2009	Arsenal de Sarandí	0	(0)
2009	→ Ñublense (loan)	8	(1)
2009	Deportivo Roca		
2010	Cipolletti	10	(2)
2010–2012	Atlanta	29	(2)
2012–2013	Deportivo Roca	–	(–)
2013–2015	Deportivo Madryn	38	(7)
2015–2016	Ñublense	14	(2)
2016–2017	Deportivo Madryn	17	(0)
2017	Sportivo Patria	13	(1)
2018–2019	Universidad SC		
2019	Deportivo Rincón	9	(1)
2021–2022	Unión Alem Progresista	6	(4)
- * Club domestic league appearances and goals

Daniel Alberto Carou (born 27 June 1984) is a former Argentine footballer who was a midfielder.

== Career ==
Besides Argentina, Carou played in Chile and Guatemala. In his homeland, he played for several clubs, such as Cipolletti, Arsenal de Sarandí, Atlanta, and Deportivo Madryn, among others.

In Chile, he played for Ñublense in the Primera División and the Primera B. In Guatemala, he played for Universidad SC in 2018.

His last club was Unión Alem Progresista.

== Honours ==
=== Player ===
Atlanta

- Primera B Metropolitana (1): 2010–11
