= Club Atlético Candelaria =

Argentine football club

Candelaria
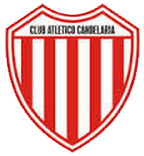
- Full name: Club Atlético Candelaria
- Nickname(s): Cande, El Leon
- Founded: October 30, 1949
- Ground: ?
- Capacity: ?
- League: Torneo Argentino C
Home colours	Away colours

Club Atlético Candelaria are a lower league football club from the city of Candelaria in the province of Misiones in Argentina.

They currently play in Torneo Argentino C which is the regionalised 5th tier of Argentinian football. They won promotion to Torneo Argentino A in 2003/04 but only survived 2 seasons before succumbing to relegation back to Argentino B.

Candalaria finished second bottom of their group in the Apertura and Clausura of Torneo Argentino B 2006–2007 condemning them to relegation to Argentino C which is the lowest level of football in the AFA league system.

== Trophies ==
- Torneo Argentino B: 1

2003-04

== See also ==
- Argentine football league system
- List of football clubs in Argentina
