= 2004–05 in Argentine football =

Football in Argentina
- Season: 2004–05

The 2004–05 Argentine First Division season saw Américo Gallego's Newell's Old Boys win the Apertura title after a fierce battle against Vélez Sársfield for the supremacy. Vélez soon got over the disappointment after winning the Clausura with Banfield finishing second despite playing most of the tournament with a young squad because they were also competing the Copa Libertadores de América.

Huracán de Tres Arroyos and Almagro were relegated to the Nacional B after lackluster performance while Argentinos Juniors and Instituto played the promotion against Atlético de Rafaela and Huracán, respectively. Both won their series and were able to stay in the top category of the Argentine Football.

== Torneo Apertura ==
Pos	Team	Pts	Pld	W	D	L	GF	GA	GD
1	Newell's Old Boys	36	19	10	6	3	22	11	11
2	Vélez Sársfield	34	19	10	4	5	21	16	5
3	River Plate	33	19	9	6	4	28	19	9
4	Estudiantes La Plata	30	19	7	9	3	22	14	8
5	San Lorenzo	30	19	8	6	5	29	22	7
6	Rosario Central	30	19	8	6	5	19	15	4
7	Colón de Santa Fe	27	19	7	6	6	24	22	2
8	Boca Juniors	26	19	7	5	7	22	16	6
9	Banfield	26	19	6	8	5	24	22	2
10	Racing Club	26	19	8	2	9	22	21	1
11	Lanús	26	19	6	8	5	25	26	–1
12	Gimnasia de La Plata	25	19	6	7	6	16	23	–7
13	Arsenal de Sarandí	24	19	5	9	5	17	16	1
14	Quilmes	24	19	6	6	7	14	18	–4
15	Independiente	23	19	6	5	8	23	26	–7
16	Argentinos Juniors	22	19	6	4	9	17	17	0
17	Almagro	22	19	4	10	5	15	18	–3
18	Olimpo de Bahía Blanca	17	19	4	5	10	21	29	–8
19	Instituto	14	19	2	8	9	16	30	–14
20	Huracán de Tres Arroyos	12	19	2	6	11	19	34	–15

=== Top Scorers ===
Position	Player	Team	Goals
1	Lisandro López	Racing Club	12
2	Jeremías Caggiano	Huracán de Tres Arroyos	8
2	Osvaldo Miranda	Almagro	8
2	Rolando Zárate	Vélez Sársfield	8
3	Nicolás Frutos	Gimnasia de La Plata	7
3	Claudio Graf	Lanús	7
3	Rodrigo Palacio	Banfield	7
3	Emanuel Villa	Rosario Central	7
4	Jairo Castillo	Independiente	6
4	Diego Galván	Olimpo de Bahía Blanca	6
4	Ezequiel Lavezzi	San Lorenzo	6
4	Martín Palermo	Boca Juniors	6
4	Hernán Peirone	San Lorenzo	6

=== Relegation ===
There is no relegation after the Apertura. For the relegation results of this tournament see below

== Torneo Clausura ==
Position	Team	Points	Played	Won	Drawn	Lost	For	Against	Difference
1	Vélez Sársfield	39	19	11	6	2	32	14	18
2	Banfield	33	19	10	3	6	25	16	9
3	Racing Club	32	19	9	5	5	25	17	8
4	Estudiantes La Plata	31	19	8	7	4	28	23	5
5	Rosario Central	31	19	8	7	4	26	23	3
6	Arsenal de Sarandí	30	19	8	6	5	27	22	5
7	Gimnasia de La Plata	29	19	9	2	8	25	25	0
8	Lanús	28	19	7	7	5	36	27	9
9	Instituto	28	19	8	4	7	32	30	2
10	River Plate	27	19	8	3	8	31	29	2
11	Colón de Santa Fe	26	19	6	8	5	30	23	7
12	Independiente	26	19	6	8	5	29	26	3
13	Olimpo de Bahía Blanca	26	19	7	5	7	18	22	-4
14	Newell's Old Boys	24	19	5	9	5	22	21	1
15	Boca Juniors	22	19	6	4	9	26	30	-4
16	San Lorenzo	22	19	6	4	9	23	29	-6
17	Argentinos Juniors	21	19	5	6	8	28	30	-2
18	Quilmes	20	19	5	5	9	16	23	-7
19	Almagro	13	19	3	4	12	22	44	-22
20	Huracán de Tres Arroyos	5	19	0	5	14	11	41	-30

=== Top Scorers ===
Position	Player	Team	Goals
1	Mariano Pavone	Estudiantes La Plata	16
2	Esteban Fuertes	Colón de Santa Fe	11
3	Nicolás Frutos	Independiente	10
4	José Luis Calderón	Arsenal de Sarandí	9
4	Claudio Enría	Gimnasia de La Plata	9
4	Josemir Lujambio	Instituto	9

=== Relegation ===
Team	Average	Points	Played	2002-03	2003-04	2004-05
River Plate	1.798	205	114	79/38	66/38	60/38
Boca Juniors	1.772	202	114	79/38	75/38	48/38
Vélez Sársfield	1.684	192	114	66/38	53/38	73/38
Banfield	1.500	171	114	48/38	64/38	59/38
San Lorenzo	1.491	170	114	56/38	62/38	52/38
Rosario Central	1.465	167	114	62/38	44/38	61/38
Racing Club	1.412	161	114	53/38	50/38	58/38
Newell's Old Boys	1.404	160	114	49/38	51/38	60/38
Colón de Santa Fe	1.395	159	114	57/38	49/38	53/38
Arsenal de Sarandí	1.386	158	114	49/38	55/38	54/38
Quilmes	1.368	104	76	N/A	60/38	44/38
Independiente	1.351	154	114	61/38	44/38	49/38
Estudiantes de La Plata	1.298	148	114	43/38	44/38	61/38
Lanús	1.289	147	114	51/38	42/38	54/38
Gimnasia de La Plata	1.211	138	114	46/38	38/38	54/38
Olimpo de Bahía Blanca	1.167	133	114	51/38	39/38	43/38
Argentinos Juniors	1.132	43	38	N/A	N/A	43/38
Instituto	1.105	42	38	N/A	N/A	42/38
Almagro	0.921	35	38	N/A	N/A	35/38
Huracán de Tres Arroyos	0.447	17	38	N/A	N/A	17/38

==== "Promoción" playoff ====
Date	Home	Away	Result
July 6, 2005	Atlético de Rafaela	Argentinos Juniors	2-1
July 10, 2005	Argentinos Juniors	Atlético de Rafaela	3-0

Argentinos Juniors wins 4-2 and remains in the Argentine First Division

Date	Home	Away	Result
July 6, 2005	Huracán	Instituto	1-2
July 10, 2005	Instituto	Huracán	1-0

Instituto wins 3-1 and remains in the Argentine First Division

== Lower Leagues ==
Level	Tournament	Champion
2nd	Primera B Nacional Apertura; Primera B Nacional Clausura	Tiro Federal; Gimnasia de Jujuy
3rd	Primera B Metropolitana	Tigre
3rd (Interior)	Torneo Argentino A	Ben Hur
4th	Primera C Metropolitana	Comunicaciones
5th	Primera D Metropolitana	Club Atlético Fénix

== Clubs in international competitions ==
Team / Competition	2004 Recopa Sudamericana	2004 Copa Sudamericana	2005 Copa Libertadores
Boca Juniors	Runner up lost to (Peru) Cienciano	Champions defeated (Bolivia) Bolívar	Quarterfinals eliminated by (Mexico) Guadalajara
River Plate	Did not play	2nd preliminary phase eliminated by (Argentina) Arsenal	Semifinal eliminated by (Brazil) São Paulo
Banfield	Did not play	1st preliminary phase eliminated by (Argentina) Arsenal	Quarterfinals eliminated by (Argentina) River Plate
Arsenal de Sarandí	Did not play	Quarterfinals eliminated by (Bolivia) Bolívar	did not qualify
San Lorenzo	Did not play	2nd preliminary phase eliminated by (Argentina) Boca Juniors	Group stage eliminated (finished last in the group)
Quilmes	Did not play	1st preliminary phase eliminated by (Argentina) San Lorenzo	Group stage eliminated (finished 3rd in the group)

== National team ==
This section covers Argentina's games from August 1, 2004 to July 31, 2005.

For the Olympic Games results, please see here. Those results are not tallied here because the team is made of Under–23 players, not the full squad.

Win Draw Loss

=== Friendly matches ===
August 18, 2004	Japan	1 – 2	Argentina	Fukuroi, Japan
12:00 UTC+09	Suzuki 71'	(Report)	Galletti 4'; Santana 39'	Stadium: Shizuoka Stadium,

December 30, 2004 Unofficial friendly	Catalonia	0 – 3	Argentina	Barcelona, Spain
		(Report)	Scaloni 1'; Rodríguez 51'; Galletti 73'	Stadium: Camp Nou; Referee: Xavier Moreno Delgado (Catalonia)

February 9, 2005	Germany	2 – 2	Argentina	Düsseldorf, Germany
20:45 UTC+01	Frings 28' (pen.); Kurányi 45'	(Report)	Crespo 40' (pen.), 81'	Stadium: LTU Arena; Attendance: 52,000; Referee: Stefano Farina (Italy)

March 9, 2005	Mexico	1 – 1	Argentina	Los Angeles, United States
20:00 UTC-08	Fuentes 23' (o.g.)	(Report)	Zárate 67'	Stadium: Los Angeles Memorial Coliseum; Attendance: 51,345

=== 2006 World Cup qualifiers ===
September 4, 2004 Round 8	Peru	1 – 3	Argentina	Lima, Peru
19:00 UTC-05	Soto 62'	(Report)	Rosales 14'; Coloccini 66'; Sorín 90+2'	Stadium: Estadio Monumental "U"; Attendance: 28,000; Referee: Carlos Eugênio Simon (Brazil)

October 9, 2004 Round 9	Argentina	4 – 2	Uruguay	Buenos Aires, Argentina
15:00 UTC-04	Lucho 6'; Figueroa 32' 54'; Zanetti 44'	(Report)	C. Rodríguez 63'; Chevantón 86' (pen.)	Stadium: Estadio Antonio V. Liberti; Attendance: 50,000; Referee: Wilson de Souza (Brazil)

October 13, 2004 Round 10	Chile	0 – 0	Argentina	Santiago, Chile
20:00 UTC-04		(Report)		Stadium: Estadio Nacional de Chile; Attendance: 57,671; Referee: Carlos Amarilla (Paraguay)

November 17, 2004 Round 11	Argentina	3 – 2	Venezuela	Buenos Aires, Argentina
21:45 UTC-04	Rey 3' (o.g.); Riquelme 45+1'; Saviola 65'	(Report)	Morán 31'; Vielma 72'	Stadium: Estadio Antonio V. Liberti; Attendance: 30,000; Referee: Gilberto Hidalgo (Peru)

March 26, 2005 Round 12	Bolivia	1 – 2	Argentina	La Paz, Bolivia
16:00 UTC-04	Castillo 49'	(Report)	Figueroa 57'; Galletti 63'	Stadium: Estadio Hernando Siles; Attendance: 25,000; Referee: Jorge Larrionda (Uruguay)

March 30, 2005 Round 13	Argentina	1 – 0	Colombia	Buenos Aires, Argentina
20:00 UTC-04	Crespo 65'	(Report)		Stadium: Estadio Antonio V. Liberti; Attendance: 40,000; Referee: Carlos Amarilla (Paraguay)

June 4, 2005 Round 14	Ecuador	2 – 0	Argentina	Quito, Ecuador
16:00 UTC-05	Lara 53'; Delgado 89'	(Report)		Stadium: Estadio Olímpico Atahualpa; Attendance: 37,583; Referee: Rubén Selman (Chile)

June 4, 2005 Round 15	Argentina	3 – 1	Brazil	Buenos Aires, Argentina
21:45 UTC-04	Crespo 3' 40'; Riquelme 18'	(Report)	Roberto Carlos 71'	Stadium: Estadio Antonio V. Liberti; Attendance: 49,497; Referee: Gustavo Méndez (Uruguay)

=== 2005 FIFA Confederations Cup ===
June 15, 2005 Group stage	Argentina	2 - 1	Tunisia	Cologne, Germany
18:00 CEST	Riquelme 33' (pen.); Saviola 57'	(Report)	Guemamdia 72' (pen.)	Stadium: RheinEnergieStadion; Attendance: 28,033; Referee: Roberto Rosetti (Italy)

June 18, 2005 Group stage	Australia	2 - 4	Argentina	Nuremberg, Germany
20:45 CEST	Aloisi 61' (pen.), 70'	(Report)	Figueroa 12', 53', 89'; Riquelme 31' (pen.)	Stadium: Frankenstadion; Attendance: 25,218; Referee: Shamsul Maidin (Singapore)

June 21, 2005 Group stage	Argentina	2 - 2	Germany	Nuremberg, Germany
20:45 CEST	Riquelme 33'; Cambiasso 74'	(Report)	Kurányi 29'; Asamoah 51'	Stadium: Frankenstadion; Attendance: 42,088; Referee: Ľuboš Micheľ (Slovakia)

June 26, 2005 Semi-finals	Mexico	1 -1 (a.e.t.) (5 - 6 p)	Argentina	Hanover, Germany
18:00 CEST	Salcido 104'	(Report)	Figueroa 110'	Stadium: AWD-Arena; Attendance: 40,718; Referee: Roberto Rosetti (Italy)
	Penalties
	Pérez (penalty scored); Pardo (penalty scored); Borgetti (penalty scored); Salcido (penalty scored); Pineda (penalty scored); Osorio (penalty missed)		(penalty scored) Riquelme; (penalty scored) Rodríguez; (penalty scored) Aimar; (penalty scored) Galletti; (penalty scored) Sorín; (penalty scored) Cambiasso

June 29, 2005 Final	Brazil	4 - 1	Argentina	Frankfurt, Germany
20:45 CEST	Adriano 11', 63'; Kaká 16'; Ronaldinho 47'	(Report)	Aimar 65'	Stadium: Waldstadion; Attendance: 45,591; Referee: Ľuboš Micheľ (Slovakia)
