= 2009–10 Campeonato Uruguayo Primera División =

106th season of the top-tier football league in Uruguay

Liga Profesional de Primera División
- Season: 2009–10
- Champions: Peñarol (46th title)
- Relegated: Cerrito; Cerro Largo; Atenas
- Copa Libertadores: Peñarol; Nacional; Liverpool
- Copa Sudamericana: Peñarol; River Plate; Defensor Sporting
- Matches: 240
- Goals: 706 (2.94 per match)
- Top goalscorer: Apertura: Maureen Franco (13 goals); Clausura: Antonio Pacheco (14 goals); Season: Antonio Pacheco (23 goals)
- Biggest home win: Liverpool 7–1 Tacuarembó; Montevideo Wanderers 7–1 Cerro Largo
- Biggest away win: Atenas 0–6 Nacional
- Highest scoring: Danubio 4–5 Tacuarembó

The 2009–10 Liga Profesional de Primera División season, also known as the 2009–10 Copa Uruguaya or the 2009–10 Campeonato Uruguayo, was the 106th season of Uruguay's top-flight football league, and the 79th in which it was professional. The season was named in honor of Héctor del Campo, ex-president of Danubio.

== Format ==
The season was divided into two tournaments: the Apertura and the Clausura. In each tournament, the teams played against each other in a single round-robin format. Whoever plays at home against an opponent in the Apertura played the same opponent as a visitor in the Clausura. The champion of the Copa Uruguaya could have been decided in three ways:

1. If the same team won both the Apertura and the Clausura.
2. If two different teams won the Apertura and the Clausura and one of those teams had the most points in the aggregate table, a single playoff match would have been contested between the two clubs. If the winner of the playoff match was the team with the most points in the aggregate table, they would have won the Copa Uruguaya. If not, the same two teams would have contested a two-legged tie, the winner of which would have been decided on points (3 for a win, 1 for a draw, 0 for a loss). If there was a tie in points after the second leg, the team with the best goal difference would be the Copa Uruguaya champion. If there was a tie in points and goal difference after the second leg, 30 minutes of extra time would be played in two 15-minutes halves, followed a penalty shootout if necessary.
3. If two different teams won the Apertura and the Clausura and neither had the most points in the aggregate table, the Apertura and Clasura winners would play one match (with extra time and a penalty shootout, if needed). The winner of the match would play a maximum of two matches (for points) against the team with the most points in the aggregate table. The team with the most points would be the champion. If there was a tie in points after the second match, goal difference would determine the champion. If there was a tie in points and goal difference after the second leg, 30 minutes of extra time would be played in two 15-minutes halves, followed a penalty shoot-out if necessary.

=== Relegation ===
Relegation was determined by an aggregate table of the past two seasons. The teams who had participated only in this season had their points and goal difference multiplied by two. The three lowest-placed teams were relegated to the Segunda División Profesional for the next season.

=== International qualification ===
Because of Uruguay's qualification to the 2010 FIFA World Cup, there was no Liguilla Pre-Libertadores this season. The champion of the Copa Uruguaya earned the Uruguay 1 berth in the 2011 Copa Libertadores and 2010 Copa Sudamericana. The Copa Uruguaya runner-up earned the Uruguay 2 berth in the 2011 Copa Libertadores. The Uruguay 3 berth for the 2011 Copa Libertadores went to the highest-placed non-qualified team in the aggregate table. The Uruguay 2 and Uruguay 3 berths for the 2010 Copa Sudamericana went to the next highest-placed non-qualified teams in the aggregate table.

== Teams ==
Sixteen teams competed in the Primera División this season. Thirteen teams remained from the 2008–09 season. Villa Española was relegated last season after the Apertura tournament due to financial reasons. They were joined by Juventud and Bella Vista, who finished 14th and 15th in the relegation table, respectively. These three teams were replaced by Fénix and Cerrito, the 2008–09 Segunda División winner and runner-up, respectively, and Atenas, the Segunda División playoff winner. Both Fénix and Cerrito are returning to the Primera División while this is Atenas' first season in the top-flight.

Locations of the 2009−10 Primera División

Team	Home city	Stadium
Atenas	San Carlos	Estadio Atenas
Central Español	Montevideo	Parque Palermo
Cerrito	Montevideo	Parque Maracaná
Cerro	Montevideo	Estadio Luis Tróccoli
Cerro Largo	Melo	Estadio Arquitecto Antonio Eleuterio Ubilla
Danubio	Montevideo	Jardines Del Hipódromo
Defensor Sporting	Montevideo	Estadio Luis Franzini
Fénix	Montevideo	Estadio Parque Capurro
Liverpool	Montevideo	Estadio Belvedere
Montevideo Wanderers	Montevideo	Estadio Viera
Nacional	Montevideo	Estadio Gran Parque Central
Peñarol	Montevideo	Estadio Centenario
Racing	Montevideo	Estadio Osvaldo Roberto
Rampla Juniors	Montevideo	Estadio Olímpico
River Plate	Montevideo	Estadio Saroldi
Tacuarembó	Tacuarembó	Estadio Goyenola

== Torneo Apertura ==
The Torneo Apertura "Coronel Matías Vázquez" began on August 23, 2009 and ended on December 13, 2009.

=== Standings ===
Pos	Team	Pld	W	D	L	GF	GA	GD	Pts	Qualification
1	Nacional	15	13	0	2	36	11	+25	36 (Note: Nacional was docked three points.)	Championship Playoffs
2	Liverpool	15	8	5	2	31	14	+17	29	
3	Defensor Sporting	15	8	5	2	28	16	+12	29	
4	Montevideo Wanderers	15	7	5	3	24	13	+11	26	
5	Peñarol	15	7	5	3	28	19	+9	26	
6	Danubio	15	7	2	6	26	25	+1	23	
7	Rampla Juniors	15	7	3	5	18	19	−1	24	
8	River Plate	15	6	5	4	24	23	+1	23	
9	Racing	15	5	5	5	25	22	+3	20	
10	Cerrito	15	4	6	5	20	21	−1	18	
11	Cerro Largo	15	4	4	7	15	18	−3	16	
12	Tacuarembó	15	5	1	9	17	24	−7	16	
13	Central Español	15	2	6	7	13	28	−15	12	
14	Cerro	15	2	5	8	18	31	−13	11	
15	Atenas	15	3	2	10	9	32	−23	11	
16	Fénix	15	1	3	11	10	26	−16	6	

Updated to match(es) played on December 13, 2009. Source: AUF
Rules for classification: 1st points; 2nd goal difference; 3rd goals scored; 4th head-to-head results; 5th draw

=== Results ===
Home \ Away	ATE	CES	CSC	CRR	CRL	DAN	DFS	FNX	LIV	WAN	NAC	PEÑ	RAC	RAM	RIV	TAC
Atenas		0–0	0–1	0–1	2–0						0–5	0–5	0–5			
Central Español			2–2				0–4	1–0	0–0	1–1		2–3	1–1	0–3	2–2	
Cerrito						2–2				1–2	2–5	2–2			1–1	2–0
Cerro		1–2	0–2		1–1		1–4	3–2						1–1	2–3	1–1
Cerro Largo		1–0	0–1			2–3			1–0	0–0	0–1	1–2	1–3			
Danubio	0–1	2–0		4–2			3–0			2–3	0–2				2–2	
Defensor Sporting	5–1		1–0		0–0			2–0	2–2		0–3		1–1			
Fénix	1–4		0–0		1–1	4–1			1–1		0–1		0–2		0–3	0–2
Liverpool	2–0		4–3	2–0		1–0						2–2	2–0	3–1		7–1
Montevideo Wanderers	0–0			3–1			2–2	2–0	0–0		4–0	0–2		0–1		
Nacional		5–1		2–0					2–1			3–0	3–2	3–0		1–0
Peñarol				1–1		2–3	1–1	1–0						3–0	2–2	1–0
Racing			1–1	3–3		1–2				0–4		2–1			0–2	4–1
Rampla Juniors	4–1		1–0		0–3	2–0	1–3	2–1					0–0			
River Plate	1–0				1–4		1–2		1–4	2–1	1–0			1–1		
Tacuarembó	2–0	3–1			3–0	1–2	0–1			1–2				0–1	2–1	

Updated to match(es) played on December 13, 2009. Source: AUF (in Spanish)
Legend: Blue = home team win; Yellow = draw; Red = away team win.

=== Top-ten goalscorers ===
Pos	Player	Team	Goals
1	(Uruguay) Maureen Franco	Cerrito	13
2	(Uruguay) Emiliano Alfaro	Liverpool	12
3	(Uruguay) Diego Ifrán	Danubio	10
4	(Uruguay) Fabricio Núñez	Cerro Largo	8
4	(Uruguay) Antonio Pacheco	Peñarol	8
6	(Uruguay) Martín Cauteruccio	Racing	7
6	(Uruguay) Ismael Espiga	Central Español	7
6	(Uruguay) Nicolás Lodeiro	Nacional	7
6	(Uruguay) Jonathan Ramis	Peñarol	7
10	(Uruguay) Diego de Souza	Defensor Sporting	6
10	(Argentina) Nicolás Guevara	Rampla Juniors	6

Updated as of games played on December 13, 2009.
Source: AUF (in Spanish)

== Torneo Clausura ==
The Torneo Clausura "Dr. Walter Lanfranco" began on January 23.

=== Standings ===
Pos	Team	Pld	W	D	L	GF	GA	GD	Pts	Qualification
1	Peñarol	15	14	1	0	40	15	+25	43	Championship Playoffs
2	Cerro	15	9	2	4	28	18	+10	29	
3	Fénix	15	8	5	2	21	11	+10	29	
4	Nacional	15	8	3	4	27	15	+12	27	
5	River Plate	15	6	5	4	31	19	+12	23	
6	Central Español	15	6	4	5	24	20	+4	22	
7	Liverpool	15	6	4	5	22	21	+1	22	
8	Rampla Juniors	15	6	4	5	18	18	0	22	
9	Racing	15	6	1	8	18	29	−11	19	
10	Tacuarembó	15	5	3	7	22	28	−6	18	
11	Defensor Sporting	15	5	2	8	21	28	−7	17	
12	Danubio	15	5	1	9	21	25	−4	16	
13	Montevideo Wanderers	15	4	3	8	25	26	−1	15	
14	Cerrito	15	4	2	9	17	27	−10	14	
15	Cerro Largo	15	3	3	9	13	34	−21	12	
16	Atenas	15	3	1	11	16	30	−14	10	

Updated to match(es) played on 2 May 2010. Source: AUF (in Spanish)
Rules for classification: 1st points; 2nd goal difference; 3rd goals scored; 4th head-to-head results; 5th draw

=== Results ===
Home \ Away	ATE	CES	CSC	CRR	CRL	DAN	DFS	FNX	LIV	WAN	NAC	PEÑ	RAC	RAM	RIV	TAC
Atenas						0–2	3–1	1–1	1–2	0–2	0–6			1–2	0–2	2–0
Central Español	1–0			1–2	1–2	2–0					0–2	0–2				4–1
Cerrito	2–0	1–3		1–4	1–1		2–0	1–2	1–4				3–0	1–1		
Cerro	3–2					1–0			5–1	1–2	3–1	1–2	1–0			
Cerro Largo	0–2			0–1			1–3	1–0						1–1	2–2	1–2
Danubio			1–0		2–0			1–2	2–2			1–2	2–3	1–2		4–5
Defensor Sporting		3–4		1–0		0–1				2–0		2–3		2–0	1–1	2–3
Fénix		2–2		2–0			3–0			2–1				1–0		
Liverpool		0–2			3–0		3–0	0–0		1–1	0–2			0–2	1–1	
Montevideo Wanderers		1–1	1–2		7–1	1–3							1–2		2–2	2–1
Nacional			3–1		3–1	2–1	0–1	1–1		2–1					1–4	
Peñarol	3–2		3–1		5–0				3–1	4–2	0–0		3–0			
Racing	3–2	1–0			1–2		3–3	0–2	2–0		0–3			2–1		
Rampla Juniors		0–0		2–2					1–3	2–1	1–0	1–2			2–1	1–0
River Plate		3–3	3–0	0–1		3–0		0–1				2–3	4–1			3–1
Tacuarembó			1–0	3–3				1–1	0–1		1–1	1–3	2–0			

Updated to match(es) played on May 2, 2010. Source: AUF (in Spanish)
Legend: Blue = home team win; Yellow = draw; Red = away team win.

=== Top-ten goalscorers ===
Pos	Player	Team	Goals
1	(Uruguay) Antonio Pacheco	Peñarol	14
2	(Uruguay) Sergio Blanco	Nacional	9
2	(Uruguay) Rodrigo Mora	Cerro	9
4	(Uruguay) Luis Machado	Tacuarembó	8
4	(Uruguay) Fabricio Núñez	Cerro Largo	8
4	(Uruguay) Ignacio Risso	Defensor Sporting	8
7	(Argentina) Nicolás Guevara	Rampla Juniors	7
7	(Uruguay) Diego Rodríguez	Central Español	7
9	(Uruguay) Diego Alonso	Peñarol	6
9	(Uruguay) Diego Ifrán	Danubio	6
9	(Argentina) Alejandro Martinuccio	Peñarol	6

Source: AUF (in Spanish)

== Aggregate table ==
Pos	Team	Pld	W	D	L	GF	GA	GD	Pts	Qualification
1	Peñarol	30	21	6	3	68	34	+34	69	2011 Copa Libertadores Second Stage (Note: Peñarol and Nacional are qualified as the season finalists (the Apertura and Clausura winners))
2	Nacional	30	21	3	6	63	26	+37	63 (Note: Nacional was docked three points.)	2011 Copa Libertadores Second Stage
3	Liverpool	30	14	9	7	53	35	+18	51	2011 Copa Libertadores First Stage
4	River Plate	30	12	10	8	55	42	+13	46	2010 Copa Sudamericana First Stage
5	Defensor Sporting	30	13	7	10	49	44	+5	46	2010 Copa Sudamericana First Stage
6	Rampla Juniors	30	13	7	10	36	37	−1	46	
7	Montevideo Wanderers	30	11	8	11	49	39	+10	41	
8	Cerro	30	11	7	12	46	49	−3	40	
9	Danubio	30	12	3	15	47	50	−3	39	
10	Racing	30	11	6	13	43	51	−8	39	
11	Fénix	30	9	8	13	31	37	−6	35	
12	Central Español	30	8	10	12	37	48	−11	34	
13	Tacuarembó	30	10	4	16	39	52	−13	34	
14	Cerrito	30	8	8	14	37	48	−11	32	
15	Cerro Largo	30	7	7	16	28	52	−24	28	
16	Atenas	30	6	3	21	25	62	−37	21	

Updated to match(es) played on May 2, 2010. Source: AUF
Rules for classification: 1st points; 2nd goal difference; 3rd goals scored; 4th head-to-head results; 5th draw

== Season topscorers ==
Pos	Player	Team	Goals
1	(Uruguay) Antonio Pacheco	Peñarol	22
2	(Uruguay) Diego Ifrán	Danubio	16
2	(Uruguay) Fabricio Núñez	Cerro Largo	16
4	(Uruguay) Sergio Blanco	Nacional	13
4	(Uruguay) Maureen Franco	Cerrito	13
4	(Argentina) Alfredo Guevara	Rampla Juniors	13
7	(Uruguay) Emiliano Alfaro	Liverpool	12
7	(Uruguay) Martín Cauteruccio	Racing	12
9	(Uruguay) Ignacio Risso	Defensor Sporting	11
10	(Uruguay) Diego de Souza	Defensor Sporting	10

Source: AUF (in Spanish)

== Relegation table ==
Pos	Team	Pld	W	D	L	GF	GA	GD	Pts	Relegation
1	Nacional	59	37	10	12	113	60	+53	118 (Note: Nacional was docked three points.)	
2	Peñarol	59	36	12	11	119	64	+55	120	
3	Defensor Sporting	59	33	11	15	101	71	+30	110	
4	Liverpool	59	28	19	12	97	67	+30	103	
5	River Plate	59	25	18	16	103	78	+25	96 (Note: In the previous season, Rampla Juniors was docked three points won against River Plate, to whom the points were then awarded to.)	
6	Cerro	59	26	14	19	96	74	+22	92	
7	Racing	59	24	17	18	89	82	+7	89	
8	Danubio	59	26	8	25	94	89	+5	86	
9	Montevideo Wanderers	59	21	13	25	91	81	+10	76	
10	Fénix	30	9	8	13	31	37	−6	68.83 (Note: Having only played one season in the Primera División, Atenas', Cerrito's, and Fénix's total points for this year were multiplied by 1.966 for the relegation table.)	
11	Central Español	59	16	18	25	70	93	−23	66	
12	Rampla Juniors	59	16	18	25	70	93	−23	63	
13	Tacuarembó	59	17	12	30	70	97	−27	63	
14	Cerrito (R)	30	8	8	14	37	48	−11	62.93	Relegation to the Segunda División Profesional
15	Cerro Largo (R)	59	13	17	29	61	97	−36	56	Relegation to the Segunda División Profesional
16	Atenas (R)	30	6	3	21	25	62	−37	41.3	Relegation to the Segunda División Profesional

Updated to match(es) played on May 2, 2010. Source: AUF
Rules for classification: 1st points; 2nd goal difference; 3rd goals scored; 4th head-to-head results; 5th draw
(R) Relegated

== Championship playoffs ==
Nacional and Peñarol qualified to the championship playoffs as the Apertura and Clausura winners, respectively. Additionally, Peñarol requalified as the team with the most points in the season aggregate table. Given this situation, an initial playoff was held between the two team. Peñarol needed only to win the playoff to become the season champions; Nacional had to win the playoff to force another two matches, which they successfully did.

May 12, 2010
20:30 (UTC-3)

Peñarol	0–2	Nacional
	Report	García 13', 60'

Estadio Centenario, Montevideo
Attendance: 50,000
Referee: Jorge Larrionda

Peñarol
Nacional

PEÑAROL:
GK	1	(Uruguay) Sebastián Sosa
RB	13	(Uruguay) Matías Aguirregaray
CB	3	(Uruguay) Gerardo Alcoba
CB	6	(Uruguay) Guillermo Rodríguez
LB	22	(Uruguay) Darío Rodríguez
DM	16	(Uruguay) Sergio Orteman	(yellow card) 17'
DM	5	(Uruguay) Egidio Arévalo Ríos	(yellow card) 33'
RW	17	(Uruguay) Jonathan Urretavizcaya
LW	25	(Uruguay) Gastón Ramírez	(yellow card) 23'	(substituted off) 62'
FW	8	(Uruguay) Antonio Pacheco (c)		(substituted off) 67'
FW	20	(Argentina) Alejandro Martinuccio	(yellow card) 85'
Substitutes:
GK	12	(Uruguay) Gonzalo Noguera
DF	4	(Uruguay) Alejandro González
DF	24	(Uruguay) Emiliano Albín
MF	10	(Uruguay) Rubén Olivera		(substituted on) 67'
MF	18	(Uruguay) Marcelo Sosa
FW	11	(Uruguay) Bosco Frontán
FW	9	(Uruguay) Diego Alonso		(substituted on) 62'
Manager:
(Uruguay) Diego Aguirre

NACIONAL:
GK	25	(Uruguay) Rodrigo Muñoz
RB	15	(Uruguay) Álvaro González
CB	2	(Uruguay) Alejandro Lembo
CB	19	(Uruguay) Sebastián Coates
LB	4	(Uruguay) Christian Núñez
DM	13	(Uruguay) Raúl Ferro		(substituted off) 76'
DM	21	(Uruguay) Óscar Morales (c)	(yellow card) 6'
AM	16	(Uruguay) Gustavo Varela	(yellow card) 21'	(substituted off) 58'
AM	10	(Argentina) Ángel Morales		(substituted off) 61'
FW	20	(Uruguay) Santiago García
FW	14	(Uruguay) Mario Regueiro	(yellow card) 16'
Substitutes:
GK	1	(Uruguay) Leonardo Burián
DF	18	(Uruguay) Gonzalo Godoy
MF	8	(Uruguay) Matías Cabrera		(substituted on) 76'
MF	22	(Uruguay) Mauricio Pereyra		(substituted on) 61'
MF	17	(Uruguay) Maximiliano Calzada		(substituted on) 58'
FW	11	(Uruguay) Sergio Blanco
FW	24	(Uruguay) Diego Vera
Manager:
(Uruguay) Eduardo Acevedo

Man of the match:
(Uruguay) Santiago García

Assistant referees:
(Uruguay) Pablo Fandiño
(Uruguay) Mauricio Espinosa
Fourth official:
(Uruguay) Darío Ubriaco

=== Finals ===
Since Nacional won the initial playoff, an additional two matches was contested to crown the champion. The points system was used for the two matches. The team with the most points at the end of the second game was declared the champion. If there was a tie in points after the second game, goal difference would be used to break the tie, followed by two fifteen-minute extra periods, followed by a penalty shootout if necessary.

Pos	Team	Pld	W	D	L	GF	GA	GD	Pts	Qualification
1	Peñarol	2	1	1	0	2	1	+1	4	2010 Copa Sudamericana Second Stage
2	Nacional	2	0	1	1	1	2	−1	1	

Rules for classification: 1st points; 2nd goal difference; 3rd extra time; 4th penalty shoot-out.
May 15, 2010
16:00 (UTC-3)

Nacional	0–1	Peñarol
	Report	Pacheco 24'

Estadio Centenario, Montevideo
Attendance: 35,000
Referee: Héctor Martínez

Nacional	Peñarol

NACIONAL:
GK	25	(Uruguay) Rodrigo Muñoz
RB	15	(Uruguay) Álvaro González		(substituted off) 73'
CB	2	(Uruguay) Alejandro Lembo	(yellow card) 45'
CB	19	(Uruguay) Sebastián Coates	(yellow card) 17'
LB	4	(Uruguay) Christian Núñez
DM	21	(Uruguay) Óscar Morales (c)
DM	13	(Uruguay) Raúl Ferro		(substituted off) 45'
AM	16	(Uruguay) Gustavo Varela	(yellow card) 61'
AM	10	(Argentina) Ángel Morales		(substituted off) 75'
FW	14	(Uruguay) Mario Regueiro	(yellow card) 90'
FW	20	(Uruguay) Santiago García	(yellow card) 62'
Substitutes:
GK	1	(Uruguay) Leonardo Burián
DF	18	(Uruguay) Gonzalo Godoy
MF	8	(Uruguay) Matías Cabrera	(red card) 77'	(substituted on) 73'
MF	17	(Uruguay) Maximiliano Calzada	(red card) 63'	(substituted on) 45'
MF	22	(Uruguay) Mauricio Pereyra
FW	11	(Uruguay) Sergio Blanco
FW	24	(Uruguay) Diego Vera		(substituted on) 75'
Manager:
(Uruguay) Eduardo Acevedo

PEÑAROL:
GK	1	(Uruguay) Sebastián Sosa
RB	13	(Uruguay) Matías Aguirregaray
CB	4	(Uruguay) Alejandro González	(yellow card) 43'
CB	6	(Uruguay) Guillermo Rodríguez
LB	22	(Uruguay) Darío Rodríguez	(yellow card) 62'
DM	5	(Uruguay) Egidio Arévalo Ríos
DM	16	(Uruguay) Sergio Orteman
RW	17	(Uruguay) Jonathan Urretavizcaya	(red card) 72'
LW	25	(Uruguay) Gastón Ramírez		(substituted off) 75'
FW	8	(Uruguay) Antonio Pacheco (c)		(substituted off) 67'
FW	20	(Argentina) Alejandro Martinuccio		(substituted off) 83'
Substitutes:
GK	12	(Uruguay) Gonzalo Noguera
DF	24	(Uruguay) Emiliano Albín
MF	10	(Uruguay) Rubén Olivera	(red card) 90+4'	(substituted on) 83'
MF	18	(Uruguay) Marcelo Sosa
MF	15	(Uruguay) Marcel Román
FW	9	(Uruguay) Diego Alonso		(substituted on) 75'
FW	11	(Uruguay) Bosco Frontán		(substituted on) 67'
Manager:
(Uruguay) Diego Aguirre

Man of the match:
(Uruguay) Sebastián Sosa

Assistant referees:
(Uruguay) Marcelo Costa
(Uruguay) William Casavieja
Fourth official:
(Uruguay) Heber Rodríguez

May 18, 2010
16:00 (UTC-3)

Peñarol	1–1	Nacional
Aguirregaray 68'	Report	Lembo 35'

Estadio Centenario, Montevideo
Attendance: 40,000
Referee: Darío Ubriaco

Peñarol
Nacional

PEÑAROL:
GK	1	(Uruguay) Sebastián Sosa	(yellow card) 90+1'
RB	24	(Uruguay) Emiliano Albín	(yellow card) 37'
CB	4	(Uruguay) Alejandro González
CB	6	(Uruguay) Guillermo Rodríguez	(yellow card) 33'
LB	22	(Uruguay) Darío Rodríguez
DM	16	(Uruguay) Sergio Orteman
DM	5	(Uruguay) Egidio Arévalo Ríos
RW	17	(Uruguay) Matías Aguirregaray	(yellow card) 44'	(substituted off) 90+4'
LW	25	(Uruguay) Gastón Ramírez	(yellow card) 22' (yellow-red card) 79'
FW	8	(Uruguay) Antonio Pacheco (c)		(substituted off) 74'
FW	20	(Argentina) Alejandro Martinuccio		(substituted off) 88'
Substitutes:
GK	12	(Uruguay) Gonzalo Noguera
DF	2	(Uruguay) Willinton Techera
MF	7	(Uruguay) Sergio Pérez
MF	15	(Uruguay) Marcel Román		(substituted on) 90+4'
MF	18	(Uruguay) Marcelo Sosa		(substituted on) 74'
FW	9	(Uruguay) Diego Alonso		(substituted on) 88'
FW	11	(Uruguay) Bosco Frontán
Manager:
(Uruguay) Diego Aguirre

NACIONAL:
GK	25	(Uruguay) Rodrigo Muñoz
RB	16	(Uruguay) Gustavo Varela	(yellow card) 12'
CB	2	(Uruguay) Alejandro Lembo	(yellow card) 69'
CB	19	(Uruguay) Sebastián Coates
LB	4	(Uruguay) Christian Núñez
DM	13	(Uruguay) Raúl Ferro		(substituted off) 80'
DM	21	(Uruguay) Óscar Morales (c)
RW	15	(Uruguay) Álvaro González		(substituted off) 72'
LW	14	(Uruguay) Mario Regueiro	(yellow card) 90+3'
AM	10	(Argentina) Ángel Morales		(substituted off) 76'
FW	20	(Uruguay) Santiago García
Substitutes:
GK	1	(Uruguay) Leonardo Burián
DF	18	(Uruguay) Gonzalo Godoy
MF	5	(Uruguay) Gianni Guigou
MF	22	(Uruguay) Mauricio Pereyra	(yellow card) 72'	(substituted on) 72'
FW	9	(Uruguay) Sebastián Balsas		(substituted on) 80'
FW	11	(Uruguay) Sergio Blanco	(red card) 88'	(substituted on) 76'
FW	24	(Uruguay) Diego Vera
Manager:
(Uruguay) Eduardo Acevedo

Man of the match:
(Uruguay) Matías Aguirregaray

Assistant referees:
(Uruguay) Maiguel Nievas
(Uruguay) Carlos Changala
Fourth official:
(Uruguay) Fernando Falce

== See also ==
- 2009–10 in Uruguayan football
