= 2009–10 in Uruguayan football =

Football in Uruguay
- Season: 2009–10

== National leagues ==
=== Primera División ===
- Champion: Peñarol (48th title)
- Top scorer: Antonio Pacheco (23 goals)
- International qualifiers:
  - Copa Libertadores:
    - Group Stage: Peñarol and Nacional
    - Preliminary Round: Liverpool
  - Copa Sudamericana:
    - First Stage: River Plate and Defensor Sporting
    - Second Stage: Peñarol
- Widest winning margin: Montevideo Wanderers 7–1 Cerro Largo (April 4, 2010), Atenas 0–6 Nacional (March 14, 2010) and Liverpool 7–1 Tacuarembó (October 22, 2009)
- Highest scoring: Danubio 4–5 Tacuarembó (January 24, 2010)
- Most wins: Nacional and Peñarol (22)
- Fewest wins: Atenas (6)
- Most draws: Central Español and River Plate (10)
- Fewest draws: Atenas and Danubio (3)
- Most losses: Atenas (21)
- Fewest losses: Peñarol (4)
- Most goals scored: Peñarol (70)
- Fewest goals scored: Atenas (25)
- Most goals conceded: Atenas (62)
- Fewest goals conceded: Nacional (28)
- Best goal difference: Nacional (+38)
- Worst goal difference: Atenas (-37)
- Relegated: Atenas, Cerro Largo and Cerrito

Source: RSSSF

=== Second Division ===
- Segunda División champion: El Tanque Sisley
  - Top scorer: Daniel Martínez (10 goals)
- Apertura champion: Miramar Misiones
  - Top scorer: Jesús Benítez (9 goals)
- Clausura champion: Bella Vista
  - Top scorer: Marcelo Fernández and José Pérez Bach (8 goals)

==== First promotion play-offs ====
Team 1	Agg.	Team 2	1st leg	2nd leg
Bella Vista	2–1	Miramar Misiones	0–0	2–1

==== Second promotion play-offs ====
Semifinals
5	Rocha	2	2	4
4	Juventud (a.e.t.)	2	6	8
6	Progreso	0	0	0
2	Miramar Misiones	1	0	1

Final
4	Juventud	1	0	1
2	Miramar Misiones	1	2	3

==== Promoted teams ====
- El Tanque Sisley
- Bella Vista
- Miramar Misiones

Source: RSSSF

== Clubs in international competitions ==
Team \ Competition	Copa Sudamericana 2009	Copa Libertadores 2010
Cerro	did not qualify	Second Stage eliminated (finish 3rd in the group)
Liverpool	First Stage eliminated by (Peru) Cienciano	did not qualify
Nacional	did not qualify	Round of 16 eliminated by (Brazil) Cruzeiro
Racing	did not qualify	Second Stage eliminated (finish 2nd in the group)
River Plate	Semifinals eliminated by (Ecuador) LDU Quito	did not qualify

== National teams ==
=== Senior team ===
This section covers Uruguay's senior team matches from 1 August 2009 until the end of the 2010 FIFA World Cup, on 11 July 2010.

==== Friendly matches ====
20 August 2009	Algeria	1 – 0	Uruguay	Algiers, Algeria
21:00 (UTC+1)	Djebbour 78'	Report		Stadium: Stade 5 Juillet 1962; Attendance: 60,000; Referee: Riad Harzi (Algeria)

3 March 2010	Switzerland	1 – 3	Uruguay	St. Gallen, Switzerland
20:15 (CET)	Rossini (yellow card) 6'; Inler 28' (pen.); Fernandes (yellow card) 84'	Report	Forlán 34'; Suárez 49'; Cavani 87'	Stadium: AFG Arena; Attendance: 12,500; Referee: Nicola Rizzoli (Italy)

26 May 2010	Uruguay	4 – 1	Israel	Montevideo, Uruguay
20:30 (UTC-3)	Forlán 14'; Á. Pereira 36'; Abreu 74', 80'	Report	Rafaelov 29'	Stadium: Estadio Centenario; Attendance: 60,000; Referee: Enrique Osses (Chile)

==== World Cup qualifiers ====
5 September 2009 Round 15	Peru	1 – 0	Uruguay	Lima, Peru
15:30 (UTC-5)	Zambrano (yellow card) 3'; Ávila (yellow card) 65'; Rengifo 86'; Vargas (yellow card) 89'	Report	Lugano (yellow card) 17'; C. Rodríguez (yellow card) 89'; Godín (red card) 89'	Stadium: Estadio Monumental "U"; Attendance: 15,000; Referee: Carlos Chandía (Chile)

9 September 2009 Round 16	Uruguay	3 – 1	Colombia	Montevideo, Uruguay
18:00 (UTC-3)	Suárez 7'; Cáceres (yellow card) 8'; Valdez (red card) 30'; Pérez (yellow card) 51'; Silva (yellow card) 66'; Scotti 77'; Eguren 87'	Report	Gutiérrez (red card) 46'; Martínez 63'	Stadium: Estadio Centenario; Attendance: 30,000; Referee: Carlos Torres (Paraguay)

10 October 2009 Round 17	Ecuador	1 – 2	Uruguay	Quito, Ecuador
17:10 (UTC-5)	Noboa (yellow card) 23'; Valencia 68', (yellow card) 68'; Ayoví (yellow card) 74'; Elizaga (yellow card) 90+2'	Report	Suárez (yellow card) 50', (goal) 69'; Lugano (yellow card) 73'; Scotti (yellow card) 88'; Forlán 90+3' (pen.)	Stadium: Estadio Olímpico Atahualpa; Attendance: 42,700; Referee: Salvio Fagundes (Brazil)

14 October 2009 Round 18	Uruguay	0 – 1	Argentina	Montevideo, Uruguay
20:00 (UTC-3)	M. Pereira (yellow card) 13'; Pérez (yellow card) 38'; Cáceres (yellow card) 76' (yellow-red card) 83'; Scotti (yellow card) 78'; Rodríguez (red card) 90+3'	Report	Heinze (yellow card) 9'; Otamendi (yellow card) 16'; Romero (yellow card) 73'; Bolatti 84'; Monzón (yellow card) 85'	Stadium: Estadio Centenario; Attendance: 60,000; Referee: Carlos Amarilla (Paraguay)

14 November 2009 Inter-confederation play-off	Costa Rica	0 – 1	Uruguay	San José, Costa Rica
20:00 (UTC-6)	Azofeifa (yellow card) 30' (yellow-red card) 52'; Centeno (yellow card) 90+2'	Report	Lugano 21'; Victorino (yellow card) 33'; Á. Fernández (yellow card) 42'; Godín (yellow card) 55'; Suárez (yellow card) 79'	Stadium: Estadio Ricardo Saprissa Aymá; Attendance: 19,500; Referee: Alberto Undiano Mallenco (Spain)

18 November 2009 Inter-confederation play-off	Uruguay	1 – 1	Costa Rica	Montevideo, Uruguay
21:00 (UTC-2)	Pérez (yellow card) 32'; Abreu 70'	Report	Bolaños (yellow card) 16'; Miller (yellow card) 17'; Centeno 74'	Stadium: Estadio Centenario; Attendance: 62,150; Referee: Massimo Busacca (Switzerland)

==== 2010 FIFA World Cup ====
11 June 2010 Group stage	Uruguay	0 – 0	France	Cape Town, South Africa
20:30 (UTC+2)	Victorino (yellow card) 59'; Lodeiro (yellow card) 65' (yellow-red card) 81'; Lugano (yellow card) 90+3'	Report	Evra (yellow card) 12'; Ribéry (yellow card) 19'; Toulalan (yellow card) 68'	Stadium: Cape Town Stadium; Attendance: 64,100; Referee: Yuichi Nishimura (Japan)

16 June 2010 Group stage	South Africa	0 – 3	Uruguay	Pretoria, South Africa
20:30 (UTC+2)	Pienaar (yellow card) 6'; Dikgacoi (yellow card) 42'; Khune (red card) 76'	Report	Forlán 24', 80' (pen.); Á. Pereira 90+5'	Stadium: Loftus Versfeld Stadium; Attendance: 42,658; Referee: Massimo Busacca (Switzerland)

22 June 2010 Group stage	Mexico	0 – 1	Uruguay	Rustenburg, South Africa
16:00 (UTC+2)	Hernández (yellow card) 77'; Castro (yellow card) 86'	Report	Suárez 43'; Fucile (yellow card) 68'	Stadium: Royal Bafokeng Stadium; Attendance: 33,425; Referee: Viktor Kassai (Hungary)

26 June 2010 Round of 16	Uruguay	2 – 1	South Korea	Port Elizabeth, South Africa
16:00 (UTC+2)	Suárez 8', 80'	Report	Lee Chung-yong 68'; Kim Jung-woo (yellow card) 38'; Cha Du-ri (yellow card) 69'; Cho Yong-hyung (yellow card) 83'	Stadium: Nelson Mandela Bay Stadium; Attendance: 30,597; Referee: Wolfgang Stark (Germany)

2 July 2010 Quarter-finals	Uruguay	1 – 1 (a.e.t.) (4 – 2 p)	Ghana	Johannesburg, South Africa
20:300 (UTC+2)	Fucile (yellow card) 20'; Arévalo Ríos (yellow card) 48'; Forlán 55'; Pérez (yellow card) 59'; Suárez (red card) 120+1'	Report	Muntari 45+2'; Paintsil (yellow card) 54'; Sarpei (yellow card) 77'; Mensah (yellow card) 93'	Stadium: Soccer City; Attendance: 84,017; Referee: Olegário Benquerença (Portugal)
	Penalties
	Forlán (penalty scored); Victorino (penalty scored); Scotti (penalty scored); M. Pereira (penalty missed); Abreu (penalty scored)		(penalty scored) Gyan; (penalty scored) Appiah; (penalty missed) Mensah; (penalty missed) Adiyiah

6 July 2010 Semi-finals	Uruguay	2 – 3	Netherlands	Cape Town, South Africa
20:30 (UTC+2)	M. Pereira (yellow card) 21', (goal) 90+2'; Cáceres (yellow card) 29'; Forlán 41'	Report	Van Bronckhorst 18'; Sneijder (yellow card) 29' (goal) 70'; Robben 73'; Boulahrouz (yellow card) 78'; Van Bommel (yellow card) 90+5'	Stadium: Cape Town Stadium; Attendance: 62,479; Referee: Ravshan Irmatov (Uzbekistan)

10 July 2010 Third place play-off	Uruguay	2 – 3	Germany	Port Elizabeth, South Africa
20:30 (UTC+2)	Cavani 28'; Forlán 51'; Pérez (yellow card) 61'	Report	Aogo (yellow card) 5'; Cacau (yellow card) 7'; Müller 19'; Jansen 56'; Khedira 82'; Friedrich (yellow card) 90+2'	Stadium: Nelson Mandela Bay Stadium; Attendance: 36,254; Referee: Benito Archundia (Mexico)

=== Uruguay U-20 ===
==== 2009 FIFA U-20 World Cup ====
26 September 2009 Group Stage	England	0 – 1	Uruguay	Ismailia, Egypt
18:45 (UTC+2)	Trippier (yellow card) 71'	Report	D. Rodríguez (yellow card) 15'; Urretavizcaya (yellow card) 63'; Viudez 84'	Stadium: Ismailia Stadium; Attendance: 10,000; Referee: Olegario Benquerenca (Portugal)

29 September 2009 Group Stage	Uruguay	3 – 0	Uzbekistan	Ismailia, Egypt
18:45 (UTC+2)	Lodeiro 28', (yellow card) 80'; Pereyra (yellow card) 35'; Ramírez (yellow card) 55'; Urretavizcaya 62', (yellow card) 85'; García 83'; D. Rodríguez (yellow card) 87'	Report	Karimov (yellow card) 7'; Irmatov (yellow card) 17'; Urunov (red card) 29'; Tukhtahujaev (yellow card) 37'; Kuvvatov (yellow card) 64'	Stadium: Ismailia Stadium; Attendance: 13,000; Referee: Roberto Rosetti (Italy)

2 October 2009 Group Stage	Uruguay	2 – 2	Ghana	Ismailia, Egypt
21:30 (UTC+2)	Lodeiro (yellow card) 5', (goal) 74'; Ramírez (yellow card) 89'; Hernández 90+1'	Report	Opare (yellow card) 19'; Rabiu 54', (red card) 75'; Addo (yellow card) 57'; Dassenu (yellow card) 62'; Osei 70'	Stadium: Ismailia Stadium; Attendance: 11,000; Referee: Ivan Bebek (Croatia)

7 October 2009 Round of 16	Brazil	3 – 1	Uruguay	Port Said, Egypt
16:30 (UTC+2)	Alan Kardec 22'; Teixeira 24', 31'; Maylson (yellow card) 38'; Toloi (yellow card) 63'; Souza (yellow card) 86'	Report	Coates (yellow card) 22'; Pereyra (yellow card) 29'; Urretavizcaya 36', (yellow card) 77'; D. Rodríguez (yellow card) 45+3'; Cabrera (yellow card) 78'	Stadium: Port Said Stadium; Attendance: 11,200; Referee: Marco Rodríguez (Mexico)

=== Uruguay U-17 ===
==== Friendly matches ====
===== Copa Diario La Voz del Interior =====
Team	Pld	W	WPk	LPk	L	GF	GA	GD	Pts
Uruguay	3	3	0	0	0	7	4	+3	9
United States	3	1	1	0	1	3	2	+1	5
Chile	3	0	1	1	1	2	3	−1	3
Argentina	3	0	0	1	2	3	6	−3	1

23 June 2010 Round 1	Uruguay	2 – 1	Chile	Córdoba, Argentina
17:30 (UTC-3)	Méndez 45', (red card) 80'; Mascia 78'	Report	Ravello 28'	Stadium: Estadio Presidente Perón; Attendance: 200; Referee: Federico Beligoy (Argentina)

25 June 2010 Round 2	United States	1 – 2	Uruguay	Córdoba, Argentina
17:30 (UTC-3)	Gulley 35'	Report	Mascia 57'; Poggi 60'	Stadium: Estadio Presidente Perón; Attendance: 200; Referee: Federico Beligoy (Argentina)

26 June 2010 Round 3	Argentina	2 – 3	Uruguay	Córdoba, Argentina
19:30 (UTC-3)	Pugh 41'; Ocampo 75'	Report	Méndez 22'; Moreira 35'; Cortalezzi 47'	Stadium: Estadio Presidente Perón; Attendance: 200; Referee: Federico Beligoy (Argentina)

==== 2009 FIFA U-17 World Cup ====
26 October 2009 Group stage	Uruguay	1 – 3	South Korea	Kaduna, Nigeria
16:00 (WAT)	Marchelli (yellow card) 18'; Gallegos 60' (pen.); Arias (yellow card) 78'	Report	Nam Seung-woo 13'; Lim Dong-cheon (yellow card) 59'; Son Heung-min 62'; Lee Jong-ho 90'	Stadium: Ahmadu Bello Stadium; Attendance: 13,700; Referee: Wolfgang Stark (Germany)

29 October 2009 Group stage	Uruguay	2 – 0	Algeria	Kaduna, Nigeria
19:00 (WAT)	Bekakchi 47' (o.g.); Gallegos 70'; Pereyra (yellow card) 85'	Report	Ziane (yellow card) 22'; Belkadi (yellow card) 42'; Cheheima (yellow card) 54'; Bekakchi (yellow card) 86'	Stadium: Ahmadu Bello Stadium; Attendance: 13,879; Referee: Viktor Kassai (Hungary)

1 November 2009 Group stage	Italy	0 – 0	Uruguay	Kano, Nigeria
19:00 (WAT)	Crisetig (yellow card) 14'; Mannini (yellow card) 19'	Report		Stadium: Sani Abacha Stadium; Attendance: 20,000; Referee: Tom Henning Øvrebø (Norway)

5 November 2009 Round of 16	Iran	1 – 2 (a.e.t.)	Uruguay	Calabar, Nigeria
19:00 (WAT)	Shirazi (yellow card) 30' (yellow-red card) 115'; Aalishah (yellow card) 59'; Lotfi (yellow card) 78'; Esmaeilzadeh 119'; Heidari (yellow card) 120'	Report	Arias (yellow card) 60'; Gallegos 104', 117'; Ichazo (yellow card) 120'	Stadium: U.J. Esuene Stadium; Attendance: 3,600; Referee: Stephane Lannoy (France)

9 November 2009 Quarter-finals	Spain	3 – 3 (a.e.t.) (4 – 2 p)	Uruguay	Kaduna, Nigeria
16:00 (WAT)	Gómez (yellow card) 10'; Isco 18' (pen.); Muniesa (red card) 45'; Borja 49', 51'; Ramos (yellow card) 76'; Aurtenetxe (yellow card) 109'	Report	Luna 11'; Sarraute (yellow card) 16' (yellow-red card) 31'; Mezquida 71'; Gallegos 84'	Stadium: Ahmadu Bello Stadium; Attendance: 10,281; Referee: Carlos Batres (Guatemala)
	Penalties
	Gómez (penalty scored); Borja (penalty scored); Aurtenetxe (penalty scored); Sarabia (penalty missed); Isco (penalty scored)		(penalty scored) Gallegos; (penalty scored) Barreto; (penalty missed) Laureiro; (penalty missed) Mezquida

Preceded by 2008–09	Seasons in Uruguayan football 2009–2010	Succeeded by 2010–11
