= 2009 Copa Sudamericana final stages =

The last four stages of the 2009 Copa Sudamericana de Clubes are the Round of 16, Quarterfinals, Semifinals, and Finals.

== Bracket ==
Round of 16
1	(Brazil) Goiás	0	3	3
16	(Paraguay) Cerro Porteño (a)	2	1	3
8	(Ecuador) Emelec	0	2	2
9	(Brazil) Botafogo	2	1	3
5	(Brazil) Fluminense	2	4	6
12	(Peru) Alianza Atlético	2	1	3
4	U. de Chile	1	1	2
13	(Brazil) Internacional	1	0	1
2	(Chile) Unión Española	2	2	4
15	(Argentina) Vélez Sársfield	3	2	5
7	(Argentina) Lanús	0	1	1
10	(Ecuador) LDU Quito	4	1	5
3	(Brazil) Vitória	1	1	2
14	(Uruguay) River Plate	4	1	5
6	(Peru) Cienciano	0	0	0
11	(Argentina) San Lorenzo	3	2	5

Quarterfinals
16	(Paraguay) Cerro Porteño	2	3	5
9	(Brazil) Botafogo	1	1	2
5	(Brazil) Fluminense	2	1	3
4	U. de Chile	2	0	2
15	(Argentina) Vélez Sársfield	1	1	2
10	(Ecuador) LDU Quito	1	2	3
14	(Uruguay) River Plate (p)	0	1	1 (7)
11	(Argentina) San Lorenzo	1	0	1 (6)

Semifinals
16	(Paraguay) Cerro Porteño	0	1	1
5	(Brazil) Fluminense	1	2	3
10	(Ecuador) LDU Quito	1	7	8
14	(Uruguay) River Plate	2	0	2

Finals
5	(Brazil) Fluminense	1	3	4
10	(Ecuador) LDU Quito	5	0	5

=== Seeding ===
Teams from the Round of 16 onwards were seeded depending on which First Stage qualifier they won (ex: the winner of First Stage Qualifier O1 were given the 1 seed). The lower seeded team will play the first leg at home.

== Round of 16 ==
The first leg of the Round of 16 was played from September 22 to September 24. The second leg was played from September 30 to October 1. Team #1 played the first leg at home.

Team #1	Points earned	Team #2	1st leg	2nd leg
Cerro Porteño (Paraguay)	(a) 3–3	(Brazil) Goiás	2–0	1–3
Vélez Sarsfield (Argentina)	4–1	(Chile) Unión Española	3–2	2–2
River Plate (Uruguay)	4–1	(Brazil) Vitória	4–1	1–1
Internacional (Brazil)	1–4	Universidad de Chile	1–1	0–1
Alianza Atlético (Peru)	1–4	(Brazil) Fluminense	2–2	1–4
San Lorenzo (Argentina)	6–0	(Peru) Cienciano	3–0	2–0
LDU Quito (Ecuador)	4–1	(Argentina) Lanús	4–0	1–1
Botafogo (Brazil)	3–3 (3–2 gd)	(Ecuador) Emelec	2–0	1–2

=== Match A ===
September 24, 2009
21:30 (UTC-4)

Cerro Porteño (Paraguay)	2 – 0	(Brazil) Goiás
Dos Santos 52'; Herner 65'	Report

Estadio General Pablo Rojas (La Olla), Asunción
Attendance: 5,893
Referee: Saúl Laverni (Argentina)

October 1, 2009
19:15 (UTC-3)

Goiás (Brazil)	3 – 1	(Paraguay) Cerro Porteño
Felipe 42', 71'; Léo Lima 80'	Report	Recalde 69'

Estádio Serra Dourada, Goiânia
Attendance: 16,294
Referee: Carlos Chandía (Chile)

Cerro Porteño advanced on away goals.

=== Match B ===
September 23, 2009
19:15 (UTC-3)

Vélez Sarsfield (Argentina)	3 – 2	(Chile) Unión Española
López 23'; Rosende 89' (o.g.); Zárate 90 + 1'	Report	Ramírez 33'; Estévez 60'

Estadio José Amalfitani, Buenos Aires
Attendance: 16,000
Referee: Walter Rial (Uruguay)

October 1, 2009
20:45 (UTC-4)

Unión Española (Chile)	2 – 2	(Argentina) Vélez Sarsfield
Ampuero 21'; Canales 41'	Report	Caruso 47', 83'

Estadio Santa Laura, Santiago
Attendance: 8,000
Referee: Salvio Fagundes (Brazil)

Vélez Sarsfield advanced 4–1 on points.

=== Match C ===
September 22, 2009
21:15 (UTC-3)

River Plate (Uruguay)	4 – 1	(Brazil) Vitória
Córdoba 8', 50'; Andrezinho 80'; Rodríguez 83'	Report	Wallace 66'

Estadio Centenario, Montevideo
Attendance: 1,000
Referee: Enrique Osses (Chile)

September 30, 2009
19:15 (UTC-3)

Vitória (Brazil)	1 – 1	(Uruguay) River Plate
Elkeson 86'	Report	Córdoba 90'

Estadio Manoel Barradas, Salvador
Referee: Pablo Pozo (Chile)

River Plate advanced 4–1 on points.

=== Match D ===
September 23, 2009
21:50 (UTC-3)

Internacional (Brazil)	1 – 1	Universidad de Chile
Kléber 76'	Report	Montillo 24'

Estadio Beira-Rio, Porto Alegre
Attendance: 6,031
Referee: Sergio Pezzotta (Argentina)

September 30, 2009
20:50 (UTC-4)

Universidad de Chile	1 – 0	(Brazil) Internacional
Olivera 37'	Report

Estadio Santa Laura, Santiago
Attendance: 22,000
Referee: Carlos Amarilla (Paraguay)

Universidad de Chile advanced 4–1 on points.

=== Match E ===
September 23, 2009
17:15 (UTC-5)

Alianza Atlético (Peru)	2 – 2	(Brazil) Fluminense
Aponte 49'; Valverde 70'	Report	Luiz Alberto 6'; Conca 74'

Estadio Miguel Grau, Piura
Referee: Carlos Vera (Ecuador)

October 1, 2009
21:45 (UTC-3)

Fluminense (Brazil)	4 – 1	(Peru) Alianza Atlético
Conca 40'; Alan 59'; Adeílson 69', 78'	Report	Valverde 16' (pen.)

Estádio do Maracanã, Rio de Janeiro
Attendance: 10,256
Referee: Sergio Pezzotta (Argentina)

Fluminense advanced 4–1 on points.

=== Match F ===
September 24, 2009
20:15 (UTC-3)

San Lorenzo (Argentina)	3 – 0	(Peru) Cienciano
Romeo 12', 57'; Rovira 34'	Report

Estadio Pedro Bidegain, Buenos Aires
Attendance: 23,000
Referee: Heber Lopes (Brazil)

September 30, 2009
17:15 (UTC-5)

Cienciano (Peru)	0 – 2	(Argentina) San Lorenzo
	Report	González 36'; Rovira 83'

Estadio Garcilaso de la Vega, Cuzco
Attendance: 20,000
Referee: Carlos Torres (Paraguay)

San Lorenzo advanced 6–0 on points.

=== Match G ===
September 24, 2009
16:00 (UTC-5)

LDU Quito (Ecuador)	4 – 0	(Argentina) Lanús
Bieler 5', 7', 26' (pen.); Méndez 90+1' (pen.)	Report

Estadio Casa Blanca, Quito
Attendance: 8,000
Referee: Wilmar Roldán (Colombia)

October 1, 2009
19:15 (UTC-3)

Lanús (Argentina)	1 – 1	(Ecuador) LDU Quito
Salcedo 76'	Report	Bieler 71'

Estadio Ciudad de Lanús, Lanús
Attendance: 7,000
Referee: Juan Soto (Venezuela)

LDU Quito advanced 4–1 on points.

=== Match H ===
September 23, 2009
21:50 (UTC-3)

Botafogo (Brazil)	2 – 0	(Ecuador) Emelec
Renato 45'; André Lima 63'	Report

Estádio Olímpico João Havelange, Rio de Janeiro
Attendance: 4,500
Referee: Carlos Galeano (Paraguay)

September 30, 2009
19:50 (UTC-5)

Emelec (Ecuador)	2 – 1	(Brazil) Botafogo
C. Quiñónez 53'; J. Quiñónez 58'	Report	André Lima 6'

Estadio George Capwell, Guayaquil
Attendance: 22,000
Referee: Víctor Hugo Rivera (Perú)

Botafogo advanced on goal difference.

== Quarterfinals ==
The first leg of the Quarterfinals was played from October 20–22. The second leg was played from November 4–5. Team #1 played the first leg at home.

Team #1	Points earned	Team #2	1st leg	2nd leg
Cerro Porteño (Paraguay)	6–0	(Brazil) Botafogo	2–1	3–1
Vélez Sarsfield (Argentina)	1–4	(Ecuador) LDU Quito	1–1	1–2
River Plate (Uruguay)	3–3 (7–6 pk)	(Argentina) San Lorenzo	0–1	1–0
Fluminense (Brazil)	4–1	Universidad de Chile	2–2	1–0

=== Match S1 ===
October 21, 2009
20:50 (UTC-3)

Cerro Porteño (Paraguay)	2 – 1	(Brazil) Botafogo
Recalde 34'; Nanni 82'	Report	Reinaldo 58'

Estadio General Pablo Rojas (La Olla), Asunción
Attendance: 7,644
Referee: Sergio Pezzotta (Argentina)

November 4, 2009
21:50 (UTC-2)

Botafogo (Brazil)	1 – 3	(Paraguay) Cerro Porteño
André Lima 73'	Report	Núñez 57'; Irrazábal 88'; Cáceres 90+2'

Estádio Olímpico João Havelange, Rio de Janeiro
Attendance: 15,428
Referee: Roberto Silvera (Uruguay)

Cerro Porteño advanced 6–0 on points.

=== Match S2 ===
October 20, 2009
21:30 (UTC-3)

Vélez Sarsfield (Argentina)	1 – 1	(Ecuador) LDU Quito
López 7'	Report	Bieler 53'

Estadio José Amalfitani, Buenos Aires
Attendance: 7,606
Referee: Paulo César de Oliveira (Brazil)

November 5, 2009
20:50 (UTC-5)

LDU Quito (Ecuador)	2 – 1	(Argentina) Vélez Sarsfield
Vera 68'; Espínola 75'	Report	López 44'

Estadio Casa Blanca, Quito
Attendance: 16,698
Referee: Carlos Chandía (Chile)

LDU Quito advanced 4–1 on points.

=== Match S3 ===
October 21, 2009
19:30 (UTC-2)

River Plate (Uruguay)	0 – 1	(Argentina) San Lorenzo
	Report	Pintos 71'

Estadio Centenario, Montevideo
Referee: Wilmar Roldán (Colombia)

November 4, 2009
19:00 (UTC-3)

San Lorenzo (Argentina)	0 – 1	(Uruguay) River Plate
	Report	Porta 46'
Penalties
Botinelli (penalty missed); Bordagaray (penalty scored); Aguirre (penalty missed); Gómez (penalty scored); Rivero (penalty scored); Romeo (penalty scored); Migliore (penalty scored); Reynoso (penalty scored); Pintos (penalty missed)	6 – 7	Andrezinho (penalty scored); Córdoba (penalty scored); Rodríguez (penalty missed); Porta (penalty missed); Porras (penalty scored); Ronaldo Conceiçao (penalty scored); Dos Santos (penalty scored); Rizotto (penalty scored); Prieto (penalty scored)

Estadio Pedro Bidegain, Buenos Aires
Attendance: 11,383
Referee: Georges Buckley (Perú)

River Plate and San Lorenzo tied on points and goal difference. River Plate advanced 7–6 on penalties.

=== Match S4 ===
October 22, 2009
21:50 (UTC-2)

Fluminense (Brazil)	2 – 2	Universidad de Chile
Fred 16', 46'	Report	Montillo 51'; Olivera 57'

Estádio Mário Filho (Maracanã), Rio de Janeiro
Attendance: 8,903
Referee: Carlos Torres (Paraguay)

November 5, 2009
20:15 (UTC-3)

Universidad de Chile	0 – 1	(Brazil) Fluminense
	Report	Fred 61'

Estadio Santa Laura, Santiago
Attendance: 15,668
Referee: Saúl Laverni (Argentina)

Fluminense advanced 4–1 on points.

== Semifinals ==
The first leg of the Semifinals was played from November 11–12. The second leg was played from November 18–19. Team #1 played the first leg at home.

Team #1	Points earned	Team #2	1st leg	2nd leg
Cerro Porteño (Paraguay)	0–6	(Brazil) Fluminense	0–1	1–2
River Plate (Uruguay)	3–3 (2–8 gd)	(Ecuador) LDU Quito	2–1	0–7

=== Match F1 ===
November 11, 2009
20:50 (UTC-3)

Cerro Porteño (Paraguay)	0 – 1	(Brazil) Fluminense
	Report	Fred 76'

Estadio General Pablo Rojas (La Olla), Asunción
Referee: Héctor Baldassi (Argentina)

November 18, 2009
21:50 (UTC-2)

Fluminense (Brazil)	2 – 1	(Paraguay) Cerro Porteño
Gum 90+3'; Alan 90+5'	Report	Cáceres 7'

Estádio Mário Filho (Maracanã), Rio de Janeiro
Referee: Carlos Chandía (Chile)

Fluminense advanced 6–0 on points.

=== Match F2 ===
November 12, 2009
21:15 (UTC-2)

River Plate (Uruguay)	2 – 1	(Ecuador) LDU Quito
Porta 9'; Córdoba 60'	Report	Méndez 34'

Estadio Centenario, Montevideo
Referee: Carlos Simon (Brazil)

November 19, 2009
17:15 (UTC-5)

LDU Quito (Ecuador)	7 – 0	(Uruguay) River Plate
Bieler 18' (pen.), 83', 89'; Espínola 28'; M. Bolaños 45+2'; Méndez 57' de la Cruz 77'	Report

Estadio Casa Blanca, Quito
Referee: Óscar Ruiz (Colombia)

LDU Quito advanced on goal difference.

== Finals ==
The finals were played on November 25 and December 2.

Team #1	Points earned	Team #2	1st leg	2nd leg
LDU Quito (Ecuador)	3–3 (5–4 gd)	(Brazil) Fluminense	5–1	0–3

November 25, 2009
18:50 (UTC-5)

LDU Quito (Ecuador)	5 – 1	(Brazil) Fluminense
Méndez 21', 44', 60'; Salas 78' de la Cruz 87'		Marquinho 1'

Estadio Casa Blanca, Quito
Attendance: 55,000
Referee: Roberto Silvera (Uruguay)

December 2, 2009
21:50 (UTC-2)

Fluminense (Brazil)	3 – 0	(Ecuador) LDU Quito
Dieguinho 14'; Fred 44'; Gum 72'

Estádio Mário Filho (Maracanã), Rio de Janeiro
Attendance: 69,565
Referee: Carlos Amarilla (Paraguay)

LDU Quito won on goal difference.
