= 2009 Copa Sudamericana first stage =

The First Stage, or the Preliminary Phase, of the 2009 Copa Sudamericana de Clubes was the first round of the tournament. It was contested by 30 teams in 15 two-legged ties. The winners of each tie advanced to the Second Stage (also known as the Round of 16).

== Matches ==
The first stage began on August 4, and ended on September 17. Team #1 played the first leg at home.

Team #1	Points earned	Team #2	1st leg	2nd leg
Atlético Mineiro (Brazil)	2–2 (5–6 pk)	(Brazil) Goiás	1–1	1–1
La Equidad (Colombia)	1–4	(Chile) Unión Española	2–2	0–1
Vitória (Brazil)	3–3 (5–3 pk)	(Brazil) Coritiba	2–0	0–2
Universidad de Chile	6–0	(Colombia) Deportivo Cali	2–1	1–0
Fluminense (Brazil)	(a) 2–2	(Brazil) Flamengo	0–0	1–1
Liverpool (Uruguay)	1–4	(Peru) Cienciano	0–0	0–2
River Plate (Argentina)	0–6	(Argentina) Lanús	1–2	0–1
Zamora (Venezuela)	0–6	(Ecuador) Emelec	0–1	1–2
Atlético Paranaense (Brazil)	1–4	(Brazil) Botafogo	0–0	2–3
LDU Quito (Ecuador)	4–1	(Paraguay) Libertad	1–0	1–1
Tigre (Argentina)	3–3 (a)	(Argentina) San Lorenzo	2–1	0–1
Alianza Atlético (Peru)	4–1	(Venezuela) Deportivo Anzoátegui	0–0	2–1
Blooming (Bolivia)	0–6	(Uruguay) River Plate	0–3	1–2
Boca Juniors (Argentina)	1–4	(Argentina) Vélez Sársfield	1–1	0–1
Cerro Porteño (Paraguay)	6–0	(Bolivia) La Paz	2–0	2–1

=== Qualifier O1 ===
August 26, 2009
21:50 (UTC-3)

Atlético Mineiro (Brazil)	1 – 1	(Brazil) Goiás
Tchô 60'	Report	Felipe 83' (pen.)

Estádio Governador Magalhães Pinto (Mineirão), Belo Horizonte
Attendance: 2,197
Referee: Wilmar Roldán (Colombia)

September 16, 2009
21:50 (UTC-3)

Goiás (Brazil)	1 – 1	(Brazil) Atlético Mineiro
Felipe 77' (pen.)	Report	Júnior 71'
Penalties
Felipe (penalty scored); Fernandão (penalty scored); Bruno Meneghel (penalty missed); Zé Carlos (penalty scored); Léo Lima (penalty scored); Vítor (penalty scored); Leandro Euzébio (penalty scored)	6 – 5	Júnior (penalty scored); Alessandro (penalty scored); Renan (penalty missed); Wellington Saci (penalty scored); Tchô (penalty scored); Alex Bruno (penalty scored); Chiquinho (penalty missed)

Estádio Serra Dourada, Goiânia
Attendance: 5,597
Referee: Leandro Pedro Vuaden (Brazil)

Goiás advances 6–5 on penalties.

=== Qualifier O2 ===
August 5, 2009
17:15 (UTC-5)

La Equidad (Colombia)	2 – 2	(Chile) Unión Española
Carreño 54'; Miranda 80' (o.g.)	Report	Canales 3', 90+3'

Estadio Nemesio Camacho "El Campín", Bogotá
Attendance: 8,823
Referee: Samuel Haro (Ecuador)

August 25, 2009
21:45 (UTC-4)

Unión Española (Chile)	1 – 0	(Colombia) La Equidad
Aravena 17'	Report

Estadio Santa Laura, Santiago
Referee: Víctor Hugo Carrillo (Perú)

Unión Española advances 4–1 on points.

=== Qualifier O3 ===
August 13, 2009
19:15 (UTC-3)

Vitória (Brazil)	2 – 0	(Brazil) Coritiba
Uelliton 46'; Jackson 72'	Report

Estádio Manoel Barradas (Barradão), Salvador
Attendance: 5,343
Referee: Carlos Galeano (Paraguay)

August 25, 2009
20:15 (UTC-3)

Coritiba (Brazil)	2 – 0	(Brazil) Vitória
Marcelinho 47'; Renatinho 58'	Report
Penalties
Marcelinho (penalty scored); Rodrigo Heffner (penalty scored); Jeci (penalty missed); Renatinho (penalty scored)	3 – 5	Carlos Alberto (penalty scored); Leandro Domingues (penalty scored); Magal (penalty scored); Apodi (penalty scored); Roger (penalty scored)

Estádio Couto Pereira, Curitiba
Referee: Víctor Hugo Rivera (Perú)

Vitória and Coritiba tied on points (3 each), goal difference (0 each), and away goals (0 each). Vitória advances 5–3 on penalties.

=== Qualifier O4 ===
August 4, 2009
20:15 (UTC-4)

Universidad de Chile	2 – 1	(Colombia) Deportivo Cali
Olivera 60', 66' (pen.)	Report	Herrera 47'

Estadio Nacional, Santiago
Attendance: 15,690
Referee: Diego Abal (Argentina)

August 18, 2009
21:30 (UTC-5)

Deportivo Cali (Colombia)	0 – 1	Universidad de Chile
	Report	Montillo 68'

Estadio Pascual Guerrero, Cali
Attendance: 8,344
Referee: Carlos Vera (Ecuador)

Universidad de Chile advances 6–0 on points.

=== Qualifier O5 ===
August 12, 2009
21:50 (UTC-3)

Fluminense (Brazil)	0 – 0	(Brazil) Flamengo
	Report

Estádio Mario Filho (Maracanã), Rio de Janeiro
Attendance: 14,221
Referee: Roberto Silvera (Uruguay)

August 26, 2009
21:50 (UTC-3)

Flamengo (Brazil)	1 – 1	(Brazil) Fluminense
Denis 60'	Report	Roni 46' (pen.)

Estádio Mario Filho (Maracanã), Rio de Janeiro
Attendance: 12,278
Referee: Carlos Chandía (Chile)

Fluminense advances on away goals.

=== Qualifier O6 ===
August 13, 2009
21:30 (UTC-3)

Liverpool (Uruguay)	0 – 0	(Peru) Cienciano
	Report

Estadio Centenario, Montevideo
Attendance: 8,074
Referee: Saúl Laverni (Argentina)

August 20, 2009
21:00 (UTC-5)

Cienciano (Peru)	2 – 0	(Uruguay) Liverpool
Guevara 31'; Santucho 59' (o.g.)	Report

Estadio Inca Garcilaso de la Vega, Cusco
Attendance: 22,196
Referee: Juan Soto (Venezuela)

Cienciano advances 4–1 on points.

=== Qualifier O7 ===
August 19, 2009
21:15 (UTC-3)

River Plate (Argentina)	1 – 2	(Argentina) Lanús
Fabbiani 68'	Report	Salvio 80', 90'

Estadio Antonio V. Liberti (El Monumental), Buenos Aires
Attendance: 19,496
Referee: Sergio Pezzotta (Argentina)

September 17, 2009
20:15 (UTC-3)

Lanús (Argentina)	1 – 0	(Argentina) River Plate
Salcedo 54'	Report

Estadio Ciudad de Lanús - Néstor Díaz Pérez, Lanús
Referee: Héctor Baldassi (Argentina)

Lanús advances 6–0 on points.

=== Qualifier O8 ===
August 5, 2009
20:00 (UTC-4:30)

Zamora (Venezuela)	0 – 1	(Ecuador) Emelec
	Report	Mendoza 90+3'

Estadio Agustín Tovar (La Carolina), Barinas
Attendance: 9,936
Referee: Georges Buckley (Perú)

August 27, 2009
20:45 (UTC-5)

Emelec (Ecuador)	2 – 1	(Venezuela) Zamora
Mendoza 70'; Peirone 89'	Report	Pérez 26'

Estadio George Capwell, Guayaquil
Referee: Jorge Osorio (Chile)

Emelec advances 6–0 on points.

=== Qualifier O9 ===
September 2, 2009
21:50 (UTC-3)

Atlético Paranaense (Brazil)	0 – 0	(Brazil) Botafogo
	Report

Kyocera Arena, Curitiba
Attendance: 14,388
Referee: Paulo César de Oliveira (Brazil)

September 16, 2009
21:50 (UTC-3)

Botafogo (Brazil)	3 – 2	(Brazil) Atlético Paranaense
Lúcio Flávio 45' (pen.); Gabriel 60'; Wellington 84'	Report	Wesley 32'; Nei 81'

Estádio Olímpico João Havelange (Engenhão), Rio de Janeiro
Attendance: 4,519
Referee: Wilson Seneme (Brazill)

Botafogo advances 4–1 on points.

=== Qualifier O10 ===
August 11, 2009
16:00 (UTC-5)

LDU Quito (Ecuador)	1 – 0	(Paraguay) Libertad
Reasco 45'	Report

Estadio Casa Blanca, Quito
Attendance: 6,786
Referee: José Buitrago (Colombia)

August 25, 2009
19:15 (UTC-3)

Libertad (Paraguay)	1 – 1	(Ecuador) LDU Quito
González 33'	Report	Méndez 64'

Estadio Defensores del Chaco, Asunción
Referee: Paulo César de Oliveira (Brazil)

LDU Quito advances 4–1 on points.

=== Qualifier O11 ===
August 18, 2009
21:15 (UTC-3)

Tigre (Argentina)	2 – 1	(Argentina) San Lorenzo
Morel 4'; Oviedo 8'	Report	Rivero 31'

Estadio Monumental de Victoria, Victoria
Attendance: 9,773
Referee: Federico Beligoy (Argentina)

September 15, 2009
20:45 (UTC-3)

San Lorenzo (Argentina)	1 – 0	(Argentina) Tigre
Bordagaray 86'	Report

Estadio Pedro Bidegain (Nuevo Gasómetro), Buenos Aires
Referee: Pablo Lunati (Argentina)

San Lorenzo advances on away goals.

=== Qualifier O12 ===
August 6, 2009
19:15 (UTC-5)

Alianza Atlético (Peru)	0 – 0	(Venezuela) Deportivo Anzoátegui
	Report

Estadio Elías Aguirre, Chiclayo
Attendance: 537
Referee: Joaquín Antequera (Bolivia)

September 15, 2009
21:45 (UTC-4:30)

Deportivo Anzoátegui (Venezuela)	1 – 2	(Peru) Alianza Atlético
García 64'	Report	Valverde 15'; Rodríguez 66'

Estadio José Antonio Anzoátegui, Puerto La Cruz
Referee: Daniel Salazar (Ecuador)

Alianza Atlético advances 4–1 on points.

=== Qualifier O13 ===
Bye for the defending champion Internacional.

=== Qualifier O14 ===
August 11, 2009
20:15 (UTC-4)

Blooming (Bolivia)	0 – 3	(Uruguay) River Plate
	Report	Puppo 61'

Estadio Ramón Aguilera, Santa Cruz
Attendance: 10,470
Referee: Víctor Hugo Carrillo (Perú)

August 27, 2009
20:15 (UTC-3)

River Plate (Uruguay)	2 – 1	(Bolivia) Blooming
Córdoba 80'; Montelongo 87'	Report	Chávez 85'

Estadio Centenario, Montevideo
Referee: Antonio Arias (Paraguay)

River Plate advances 6–0 on points.

=== Qualifier O15 ===
August 20, 2009
20:15 (UTC-3)

Boca Juniors (Argentina)	1 – 1	(Argentina) Vélez Sársfield
Mouche 3'	Report	Paletta 78' (o.g.)

Estadio Alberto J. Armando (La Bombonera), Buenos Aires
Attendance: 10,248
Referee: Diego Abal (Argentina)

September 16, 2009
21:25 (UTC-3)

Vélez Sársfield (Argentina)	1 – 0	(Argentina) Boca Juniors
Cristaldo 60'	Report

José Amalfitani Stadium, Buenos Aires
Referee: Saúl Laverni (Argentina)

Vélez Sarsfield advances 4–1 on points.

=== Qualifier O16 ===
August 12, 2009
18:30 (UTC-3)

Cerro Porteño (Paraguay)	2 – 0	(Bolivia) La Paz
Nanni 20'; Brítez 56'	Report

Estadio General Pablo Rojas (La Olla), Asunción
Attendance: 8,189
Referee: Pablo Pozo (Chile)

August 20, 2009
16:00 (UTC-4)

La Paz (Bolivia)	1 – 2	(Paraguay) Cerro Porteño
Segovia 46'	Report	Nanni 6' dos Santos 34'

Estadio Hernando Siles, La Paz
Attendance: 2,191
Referee: Martín Vázquez (Uruguay)

Cerro Porteño advances 6–0 on points.

== Notes ==
1.The match was suspended in the 66th minute after a fan rushed the field and attacked a River Plate player. At the time, River Plate was ahead 1–0. CONMEBOL punished Blooming by changing the results to 3–0 and fining the club $10,000.
2.The match report erroneously places Gabriel Paletta's own goal in the 33rd minute of the first half. In actuality, the own goal occurred in the second half of the game at around the 78th minute mark. The mistake could be due to referee error since the 78th minute of the match is the 33rd minute of the second half.
