= 2009 CR Vasco da Gama season =

CR Vasco da Gama
2009 season
- Chairman: Eurico Miranda
- Manager: Dorival Júnior
- Stadium: São Januário
- Campeonato Brasileiro Série B: 1st (promoted)
- Campeonato Carioca: Taça Guanabara: 6th Taça Rio: Semi-finals
- Copa do Brasil: Semi-finals
Home colours	Away colours

The 2009 season was the 111th in the history of Club de Regatas Vasco da Gama. The club competed in the Campeonato Brasileiro Série B following relegation in the previous season, as well as in the Campeonato Carioca and the Copa do Brasil.

The club won the Série B title and returned to the top division. In the Campeonato Carioca, it reached the semifinals of the Taça Rio stage, while in the Copa do Brasil it advanced to the semifinals.

== Squad ==
=== Transfers In ===
Pos.	Player	Transferred from	Fee	Date	Source
MF	(Brazil) Rodrigo Pimpão	(Brazil) Paraná	€750,000	1 January 2009	
FW	(Brazil) Adriano	(Brazil) SC Internacional	Loan	7 January 2009	
MF	(Brazil) Carlos Alberto	(Germany) Werder Bremen	Loan	7 January 2009	

=== Transfers Out ===
Pos.	Player	Transferred to	Fee	Date	Source
MF	(Brazil) Alan Kardec	(Brazil) SC Internacional	Loan	9 July 2009	

== Friendlies ==
14 January 2009	Vilavelhense (Espírito Santo)	2–4	(Rio de Janeiro (state)) Vasco da Gama	Vila Velha
	Ernandes 10'; Cléber 18'		Paulo Sérgio 32'; Faioli 67'; Enrico 68'; Ramón 77'

== Competitions ==
=== Overall record ===
Competition	First match	Last match	Starting round	Final position	Record							
Competition	First match	Last match	Starting round	Final position	Pld	W	D	L	GF	GA	GD	Win %
Série B	9 May 2009	28 November 2009	Matchday 1	Winners	38	22	10	6	58	29	+29	57.89
Campeonato Carioca	24 January 2009	11 April 2009	Taça Guanabara	Taça Guanabara: 6th Taça Rio: Semi-finals	16	12	2	2	35	13	+22	75.00
Copa do Brasil	18 February 2009	3 June 2009		Semi-finals	7	4	3	0	18	5	+13	57.14
Total					61	38	15	8	111	47	+64	62.30

Source: Competitions

=== Campeonato Brasileiro Série B ===
Pos	Team	Pld	W	D	L	GF	GA	GD	Pts	Promotion or relegation
1	Vasco da Gama (C, P)	38	22	10	6	58	29	+29	76	Promotion to Campeonato Brasileiro
2	Guarani (P)	38	21	6	11	55	51	+4	69	Promotion to Campeonato Brasileiro
3	Ceará (P)	38	19	11	8	54	34	+20	68	Promotion to Campeonato Brasileiro
4	Atlético Goianiense (P)	38	20	5	13	73	53	+20	65	Promotion to Campeonato Brasileiro
5	Portuguesa	38	18	8	12	53	45	+8	62	

Source: CBF
Rules for classification: 1st points; 2nd wins; 3rd goal difference; 4th goals scored; 5th head-to-head results; 6th least red cards received; 7th least yellow cards received; 8th draw
(C) Champions; (P) Promoted

==== Results summary ====
Overall								Home						Away					
Pld	W	D	L	GF	GA	GD	Pts	W	D	L	GF	GA	GD	W	D	L	GF	GA	GD
38	22	10	6	58	29	+29	76	13	3	3	33	11	+22	9	7	3	25	18	+7

==== Results by round ====
Round	1	2	3	4	5	6	7	8	9	10	11	12	13	14	15	16	17	18	19	20	21	22	23	24	25	26	27	28	29	30	31	32	33	34	35	36	37	38
Ground	H	A	H	A	H	A	H	A	H	H	A	H	A	H	A	H	A	A	H	A	H	A	H	A	H	A	H	A	A	H	A	H	A	H	A	H	H	A
Result	W	W	W	L	D	D	D	D	D	W	W	W	L	W	W	W	D	W	W	W	L	D	W	W	W	W	L	D	D	W	W	W	D	W	W	W	L	L
Position	8	5	1	3	4	4	5	6	8	8	5	3	5	5	2	2	2	2	1	1	1	1	1	1	1	1	1	1	1	1	1	1	1	1	1	1	1	1

A = Away; H = Home; W = Win; D = Draw; L = Loss

==== Matches ====
9 May 2009 1	Vasco da Gama	1–0	Brasiliense	Rio de Janeiro
16:10 UTC−3	Rodrigo Pimpão 62'			Stadium: São Januário

16 May 2009 2	Ceará	0–2	Vasco da Gama	Fortaleza
16:10 UTC−3			Ramón 50'; Léo Lima 82'	Stadium: Castelão

23 May 2009 3	Vasco da Gama	3–0	Atlético Goianiense
16:10 UTC−3

30 May 2009 4	Paraná	3–1	Vasco da Gama
16:10 UTC−3

6 June 2009 5	Vasco da Gama	0–0	São Caetano
21:00 UTC−3

13 June 2009 6	Guarani	0–0	Vasco da Gama
16:10 UTC−3

19 June 2009 7	Vasco da Gama	0–0	Duque de Caxias
21:00 UTC−3

27 June 2009 8	Figueirense	1–1	Vasco da Gama
16:10 UTC−3

30 June 2009 9	Vasco da Gama	0–0	Bragantino
21:00 UTC−3

11 July 2009 10	Vasco da Gama	3–0	Ponte Preta
16:10 UTC−3

14 July 2009 11	Vila Nova	0–2	Vasco da Gama
21:00 UTC−3

17 July 2009 12	Vasco da Gama	3–0	ABC
21:00 UTC−3

25 July 2009 13	Bahia	2–1	Vasco da Gama
16:10 UTC−3

28 July 2009 14	Vasco da Gama	2–1	Fortaleza
21:00 UTC−3

1 August 2009 15	Juventude	1–2	Vasco da Gama
16:10 UTC−3

8 August 2009 16	Vasco da Gama	3–0	Campinense
16:10 UTC−3

11 August 2009 17	América de Natal	2–2	Vasco da Gama
21:00 UTC−3

15 August 2009 18	Portuguesa	1–3	Vasco da Gama
16:10 UTC−3

22 August 2009 19	Vasco da Gama	4–0	Ipatinga
16:10 UTC−3

25 August 2009 20	Brasiliense	0–1	Vasco da Gama	Taguatinga
21:00 UTC−3			Ramón 5'	Stadium: Serejão

28 August 2009 21	Vasco da Gama	0–2	Ceará	Rio de Janeiro
21:00 UTC−3			Wellington Amorim 62'; Mota 84'	Stadium: Maracanã Stadium; Attendance: 25,360; Referee: Devarly Lira

5 September 2009 22	Atlético Goianiense	2–2	Vasco da Gama
16:10 UTC−3

11 September 2009 23	Vasco da Gama	2–1	Paraná
21:00 UTC−3

15 September 2009 24	São Caetano	0–1	Vasco da Gama
21:00 UTC−3

19 September 2009 25	Vasco da Gama	1–0	Guarani
16:10 UTC−3

26 September 2009 26	Duque de Caxias	0–1	Vasco da Gama
16:10 UTC−3

29 September 2009 27	Vasco da Gama	1–2	Figueirense
21:00 UTC−3

3 October 2009 28	Bragantino	0–0	Vasco da Gama
16:10 UTC−3

10 October 2009 29	Ponte Preta	1–1	Vasco da Gama
16:10 UTC−3

13 October 2009 30	Vasco da Gama	4–1	Vila Nova
21:00 UTC−3

21 October 2009 31	ABC	2–3	Vasco da Gama

24 October 2009 32	Vasco da Gama	2–1	Bahia

31 October 2009 33	Fortaleza	1–1	Vasco da Gama

7 November 2009 34	Vasco da Gama	2–1	Juventude

11 November 2009 35	Campinense	0–1	Vasco da Gama

14 November 2009 36	Vasco da Gama	2–1	América de Natal

21 November 2009 37	Vasco da Gama	0–1	Portuguesa

28 November 2009 38	Ipatinga	2–0	Vasco da Gama

=== Campeonato Carioca ===
==== Results summary ====
Overall								Home						Away					
Pld	W	D	L	GF	GA	GD	Pts	W	D	L	GF	GA	GD	W	D	L	GF	GA	GD
7	4	2	1	13	4	+9	8	1	1	1	3	3	0	3	1	0	10	1	+9

24 January 2009	Vasco da Gama	0–2	Americano FC

28 January 2009	Tigres do Brasil	0–4	Vasco da Gama

31 January 2009	Vasco da Gama	3–1	Duque de Caxias

5 February 2009	Resende	1–3	Vasco da Gama

8 February 2009 5	Fluminense FC	0–0	Vasco da Gama	Rio de Janeiro
				Stadium: Maracanã Stadium; Referee: William Marcelo Souza Nery

11 February 2009	Vasco da Gama	0–0	Cabofriense

15 February 2009	Madureira	0–3	Vasco da Gama

==== Taça Rio ====
8 March 2009	Vasco da Gama	3–0	Friburguense

12 March 2009	Botafogo	1–4	Vasco da Gama

15 March 2009	Boavista	0–1	Vasco da Gama

22 March 2009	Vasco da Gama	2–0	Flamengo	Rio de Janeiro
	Carlos Alberto (yellow card) 11' (red card) 33'; Ramón (yellow card) 29' (red card) 60', (goal) 57'; Tití (yellow card) 38' (red card) 90'; Jeferson 61'		Willians (yellow card) 16' (red card) 17'; Léo Moura (red card) 53'	Stadium: São Januário; Referee: Luís Antônio Silva dos Santos

25 March 2009	Vasco da Gama	2–1	Mesquita

28 March 2009	Volta Redonda	3–5	Vasco da Gama

1 April 2009	Macaé	0–1	Vasco da Gama

5 April 2009	Vasco da Gama	4–0	Bangu

===== Semi-finals =====
11 April 2009	Vasco da Gama	0–4	Botafogo	Rio de Janeiro
	Leonardo (yellow card) 47' (red card) 55'		Maicosuel 19', 66'; Thiaguinho 30'; Gabriel Silva 62'	Stadium: Maracanã Stadium; Referee: João Batista de Arruda

=== Copa do Brasil ===
18 February 2009 First round	Flamengo do Piauí	1–4	Vasco da Gama

16 April 2009 Second round	Central	0–3	Vasco da Gama

==== Third round ====
30 April 2009 First leg	Vasco da Gama	1–1	Icasa	Rio de Janeiro
19:30 UTC−3	Vilson 7'		Marciano 75'	Stadium: São Januário; Attendance: 5,691; Referee: Wagner Reway

6 May 2009 Second leg	Icasa	1–4 (2–5 agg.)	Vasco da Gama	Juazeiro do Norte
				Stadium: Estádio Mauro Sampaio; Attendance: 8,978; Referee: Antônio Hora Filho

==== Quarter-finals ====
13 May 2009 First leg	Vasco da Gama	4–0	Vitória	Rio de Janeiro
19:30 UTC−3	Carlos Alberto 27'; Élton 44'; Paulo Sérgio 55'; Nilton 62'			Stadium: São Januário; Attendance: 10,598; Referee: Alício Pena Junior

20 May 2009 Second leg	Vitória	1–1 (1–5 agg.)	Vasco da Gama	Salvador
21:50 UTC−3	Neto Baiano 1'		Élton 4'	Stadium: Barradão; Attendance: 9,711; Referee: André Luiz de Freitas Castro

==== Semi-finals ====
27 May 2009 First leg	Vasco da Gama	1–1	Corinthians	Rio de Janeiro
21:50 UTC−3	Rodrigo Pimpão 73'		Dentinho 29'	Stadium: Maracanã Stadium; Attendance: 72,183; Referee: Héber Roberto Lopes

3 June 2009 Second leg	Corinthians	0–0 (1–1(a) agg.)	Vasco da Gama	São Paulo
21:50 UTC−3				Stadium: Pacaembu Stadium; Attendance: 35,946; Referee: Leonardo Gaciba
