= Apolonio (name) =

Apolonio (Spanish), Apolônio and Apolónio (Portuguese) is both a male given name and a surname. Notable people with the name include:

== Given names ==
- Apolonio Castillo (1921–1957), Mexican swimmer
- Apolônio de Carvalho (1912–2005), Brazilian socialist and military officer
- Apolonio Lombardo (1934–2020), Panamanian footballer
- Apolonio Méndez Meneses (born 1946), Mexican politician
- Apolônio Moraes Paixão Neto (born 1982), Brazilian footballer

== Middle names ==
- José Apolonio Burgos (1837–1872), Filipino Catholic priest
- Juan Apolonio Vairo (born 1932), Argentine footballer
- Omar Apolonio Velasco (born 1997), American singer-songwriter
- Rogerio Apolonio de Sousa (1910–1976), Portuguese footballer

== Surnames ==
- Aco Apolonio (1916–2001), Serbian lawyer and politician
- Gabino Apolonio (born 1971), Mexican long-distance runner
- Mateo Apolonio (born 2010), Argentine footballer

== See also ==
- Libro de Apolonio, an anonymous work of medieval Spanish literature
