= Luis Cáceres (footballer) =

Paraguayan footballer (born 1988)

Personal information
- Full name: Luis Enrique Cáceres Centurión
- Date of birth: 16 April 1988 (age 38)
- Place of birth: Asunción, Paraguay
- Height: 1.75 m (5 ft 9 in)
- Position: Midfielder

Team information
- Current team: Sport Boys
- Number: 28

Youth career
- 2004–2006: Sport Colombia

Senior career*
Years	Team	Apps	(Gls)
2007–2012	Cerro Porteño	93	(11)
2012	Libertad	15	(0)
2013–2014	Vitória	58	(4)
2015–2016	Coritiba	16	(1)
2016–2017	Olimpia	12	(2)
2017	Rubio Ñu	14	(2)
2018	Paysandu	4	(0)
2019	San Lorenzo	15	(3)
2019	Deportivo Capiatá	13	(0)
2020–	Sport Boys	1	(0)

International career
2007	Paraguay U-20	7	(1)
2008	Paraguay	2	(0)
- * Club domestic league appearances and goals as of 19:09, 3 May 2020 (UTC)

Luis Enrique Cáceres (born 16 April 1988) is a Paraguayan football midfielder who currently plays for Sport Boys.

== Career ==
He is distinguished by his smooth handling of the ball in order to create attacking moves for his team. On more than one occasion, the Paraguayan press has considered him the best creation midfielder of Paraguayan football, reaching his consolidation in the 2009 season, in which he highlighted as a figure of his team that won the local title and advanced to the semifinals of the Copa Sudamericana. One of his most important goals came in a Paraguayan football derby played in 2008, in which he entered at the 66th minute of the game and, 10 minutes from the end, scored the winning goal.

== National team ==
He made his debut for the senior Paraguay national football team in a friendly against South Africa on 26 March 2008. He also joined the U-17 and U-20 during the South American 2005 and 2007, respectively.

== Honours ==
Cerro Porteño

- Primera División de Paraguay: Apertura 2009

Vitória

- Campeonato Baiano: 2013
