= Cristian Fabbiani =

Argentine footballer (born 1983)

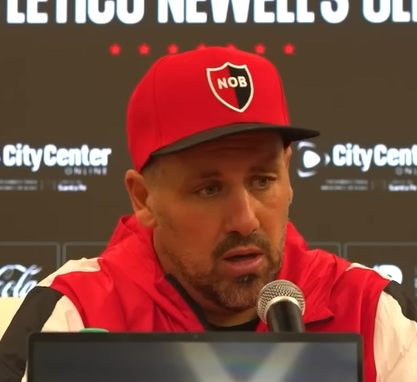
- Fabbiani as manager of Newell's Old Boys in 2025

Personal information
- Full name: Cristian Gastón Fabbiani
- Date of birth: 3 September 1983 (age 43)
- Place of birth: Ciudad Evita, Argentina
- Height: 1.89 m (6 ft 2 in)
- Position: Forward

Senior career*
Years	Team	Apps	(Gls)
2001–2007	Lanús	68	(16)
2003–2004	→ Palestino (loan)	25	(16)
2006	→ Beitar Jerusalem (loan)	6	(0)
2007–2010	CFR Cluj	29	(12)
2008	→ Newell's Old Boys (loan)	15	(5)
2009	→ River Plate (loan)	25	(2)
2010–2011	All Boys	14	(2)
2011–2013	Independiente Rivadavia	30	(9)
2014–2015	Sport Boys Warnes	8	(0)
2015	Estudiantes San Luis	13	(3)
2016	L.D.U. Portoviejo	5	(1)
2016–2018	Deportivo Merlo	61	(13)
2018	CD Universitario	1	(0)
2018–2020	Deportivo Merlo	43	(15)
Total		343	(91)

Managerial career
- 2021–2022: Fenix de Pilar
- 2022–2023: Deportivo Riestra
- 2023: Deportivo Merlo
- 2024–2025: Deportivo Riestra
- 2025: Newell's Old Boys
- 2026: Vardar
- * Club domestic league appearances and goals

Cristian Gastón Fabbiani (born 3 September 1983), also known as El Ogro, is an Argentine former professional footballer.

== Playing career ==
=== Lanús and Palestino ===
Fabbiani was born on 3 September 1983 in Ciudad Evita, Argentina. He comes from a family of footballers, with 13 professional footballers on his father's side, including his uncle Óscar Fabbiani, who played for Chile's national team. On 3 March 2002, he made his debut in the Argentine Primera División, playing for Lanús when coach Carlos Aimar sent him at half-time to replace Santiago Hoyos in a 1–1 draw against Estudiantes. He was used rarely in his first years at Lanus, being loaned to Chilean Primera División side, Palestino, where he began to demonstrate a keen appetite for scoring goals. During his period spent in Chile with Palestino, he was nicknamed El Ogro (English: The Ogre) which was a reference to a goal celebration he performed with a Shrek mask.

=== Lanús and Beitar Jerusalem ===
At the beginning of 2005, Fabbiani returned to Lanús, scoring one goal in his first match upon his return, a 2–2 draw against Boca Juniors. He continued to score a week later in a 3–0 home win over Gimnasia La Plata, and netted two doubles until the end of the season, with the first in a 2–0 win over Argentinos Juniors and the second in 6–0 success against Almagro. Fabbiani started the following season by receiving a red card in the third round in a 1–1 draw against Boca Juniors. Subsequently, he scored four goals by the end of the first half of the season, one in a 3–1 victory over Colón, a brace in a 2–1 win against Arsenal de Sarandí and a goal in a 2–2 draw against Estudiantes de La Plata. In the second half of the season, he scored another four goals in four victories over Rosario Central, Tiro Federal, River Plate and Newell's Old Boys, but also received a red card in the game against the latter and a second one against Estudiantes. Fabbiani started the 2006–07 season at Lanús, but after four games of which one was a 2–0 win over Vélez Sarsfield in the 2006 Copa Sudamericana, he went on loan to Israeli Premier League side, Beitar Jerusalem. There, he worked with coach Luis Fernandez, playing six league games without scoring, returning to Lanús for the second half of the season, but Beitar managed to win the title without him. On 4 March 2007, Fabbiani scored his last goal for Lanús when he closed the scoring in a 3–2 away victory against Rosario Central.

=== CFR Cluj ===
In 2007 he was transferred by Lanús to Romania at CFR Cluj, around the same time that compatriot Emmanuel Culio joined the squad, with the transfer fee being estimated between €2–3 million. Fabbiani made his Liga I debut under coach Ioan Andone on 1 August in a 1–0 away win over Oțelul Galați in which he provided an assist for a goal scored by Didi, which was eventually cancelled by the referee. He scored his first goal on 25 August in a 2–1 away victory against Gloria Buzău, and afterwards netted a brace on 16 September in a 2–0 away win over Farul Constanța. On 28 October, after receiving the ball with his back to the goal and turning to kick it, he scored a spectacular and decisive goal in a 2–1 win against Rapid București. By the end of 2007 he continued to score four more goals, one against UTA Arad, one in the Cluj derby against Universitatea Cluj and the last two against Gloria Bistrița and Oțelul Galați. While the game against Bistrița ended up in a draw, all the others finished with victories. He started 2008 by scoring a double on 23 February in a 4–1 win over Universitatea Craiova, and then did not score until 19 April when he scored with his heel to seal a 3–0 success against UTA Arad. Fabbiani ended his first season with CFR by winning The Double, which constituted the club's first trophies. He contributed with 11 goals netted in 28 league matches which made him the team's second top-scorer, having two fewer than Eugen Trică. Fabbiani also played four games with one goal scored in a 3–0 victory against FC Săcele in the early stage of the Cupa României. In the final of that competition, Andone sent him in the 77th minute to replace Diego Ruiz in the 2–1 win over Unirea Urziceni. In the same season he made his debut in a European club competition, playing in both legs of the 3–1 aggregate loss to Anorthosis in the UEFA Cup second qualifying round. In the next season he played only in the first round for CFR, managing to score the final goal of the 4–0 victory against Otopeni, and was shortly afterwards loaned to Argentine club Newell's Old Boys.

=== Newell's Old Boys and River Plate ===
Fabbiani made his debut for Newell's under coach Fernando Gamboa on 13 September 2008 in a 2–1 victory over his former team, Lanús, with the Olé newspaper writing:"A group achievement, sacrifice from everyone and an Ace of Swords...The Ogre Fabbiani". He scored his first goal on 21 September, which was the only one in the victory against Independiente. Subsequently, until the end of the year, he managed to score four more goals against Argentinos Juniors, Estudiantes de La Plata, Banfield and San Lorenzo. In 2009, he was loaned again by CFR, this time at River Plate for a $500,000 fee. In the first round of the Clausura 2009, before a match against Colón, Fabbiani was presented to the fans at the El Monumental stadium together with Marcelo Gallardo, both of them wearing a River shirt with the motto: Por amor a River (English: For the love of River). His transfer caused a stir among River Plate supporters, which inspired the musician Javier Montes, who was a fan of the team, to compose a song for him called La Banda del Ogro (English: The Band of the Ogre). He made his debut for River on 15 February when coach Néstor Gorosito sent him in the 57th minute to replace Diego Buonanotte, forming a partnership in the team's offence with Radamel Falcao, and Fabbiani managed to score just 10 minutes after entering the field the decisive goal of the 2–1 away victory over Rosario Central. He wouldn't score in the league until 13 June when he closed the score in a 3–1 win over Tigre. Fabbiani represented Los Millonarios in the 2009 Copa Libertadores group stage, appearing in five games, and also played in both legs of the 2009 Copa Sudamericana first stage, scoring a goal in the 3–1 aggregate loss to his former team, Lanús.

=== All Boys ===
In 2010, Fabbiani went to Mexican second division side CD Veracruz, but he failed to impress in preseason training, resulting in the contract's termination. Shortly afterwards he joined recently promoted Argentine Primera División club All Boys. He made his debut for them on 23 August when coach José Romero sent him in the 81st minute to replace Mauro Matos in a 2–0 home victory against Boca Juniors. On 16 April 2011, he scored a brace in a 3–1 win over Huracán, and these were his last goals in the Argentine Primera División, a competition in which he amassed a total of 123 appearances with 24 goals.

=== Late career ===
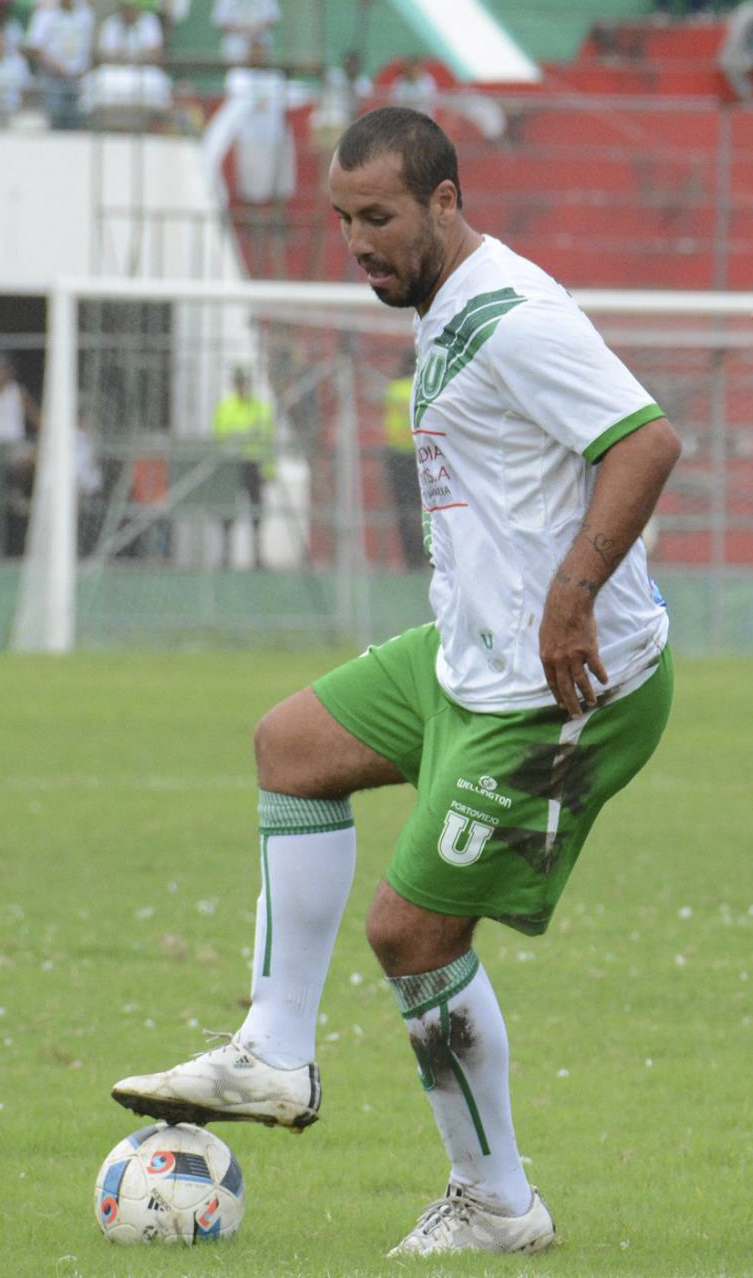
Fabbiani playing for Ecuadorian club L.D.U. Portoviejo in 2016

From 2011 until 2016, Fabbiani played for Argentine second league sides Independiente Rivadavia, and Estudiantes San Luis. He also had two short spells abroad at Bolivian Primera División team Sport Boys Warnes and Ecuadorian side L.D.U. Portoviejo. Subsequently, Fabbiani spent the last years of his career playing in the fourth league of Argentine football at Deportivo Merlo, with a short 2018 interruption at Liga Panameña de Fútbol club CD Universitario. He announced his retirement in October 2020.

== Managerial career ==
In June 2021, Fabbiani started his career as manager at Primera B Metropolitana club, Fenix de Pilar. After one year at Fenix in which he obtained only six victories, his contract was not renewed, but he went to coach Primera Nacional side Deportivo Riestra in June 2022. Fabbiani stayed with them until April 2023 when he returned to Primera B Metropolitana at Deportivo Merlo which he helped avoid relegation. In February 2024 he went back to coach Deportivo Riestra, this time in the Argentine Primera División, making his debut in a 3–0 home loss to River Plate. On 16 May 2024, during a 1–0 loss to Newell's Old Boys in the Copa Argentina, he gave the professional debut to Mateo Apolonio at age 14 years and 29 days, who became the youngest player in Argentinian football. Fabbiani was the subject of criticism when on 11 November 2024, at the club's orders, he used streamer Iván Buhajeruk (Spreen) for about one minute in a 1–1 draw against Vélez Sarsfield for a publicity stunt. After achieving good results with Deportivo Riestra, Fabbiani took over Newell's Old Boys in February 2025. Under his leadership, the team achieved important victories, including one against Boca Juniors. However, in the second half of the year, the team had a six-game winless streak and suffered an early elimination in the Copa Argentina, leading to his dismissal in October 2025.

== Personal life ==
In 2012, Fabbiani appeared in the music video for "Fuego", a single by Ángela Leiva.

== Honours ==
=== Player ===
Beitar Jerusalem

- Israeli Premier League: 2006–07

CFR Cluj

- Liga I: 2007–08
- Cupa României: 2007–08
