= 2008 in Paraguayan football =

The following article presents a summary of the 2008 association football season in Paraguay. One of the most noticeable changes in the 2008 season is that the first division tournament will not longer have a single champion for the year; instead there will be two champions in the season, one being the winner of the Apertura tournament and the other being the winner of the Clausura tournament.

== First division results ==
The first division tournament was divided in two sections: the Apertura and the Clausura and had 12 teams participating in a two round all-play-all system. The team with the most points at the end of the two rounds was crowned as the champion.

=== Torneo Apertura ===
Pos	Team	Pld	W	D	L	GF	GA	GD	Pts
1	Libertad	22	18	3	1	53	13	+40	57
2	Nacional	22	14	3	5	45	25	+20	45
3	Cerro Porteño	22	11	5	6	34	26	+8	38
4	Guaraní	22	11	3	8	31	26	+5	36
5	2 de Mayo	22	9	4	9	27	26	+1	31
6	Sol de América	22	8	3	11	40	39	+1	27
7	3 de Febrero	22	8	3	11	32	40	−8	27
8	Olimpia	22	7	5	10	23	32	−9	26
9	Sportivo Luqueño	22	6	7	9	33	44	−11	25
10	Tacuary	22	5	8	9	24	34	−10	23
11	12 de Octubre	22	4	8	10	29	40	−11	20
12	Silvio Pettirossi	22	3	4	15	21	47	−26	13

Updated to match(es) played on June 24, 2008. Source: League Stats (in Spanish)
Rules for classification: 1) points; 2) goal difference; 3) number of goals scored.

=== Torneo Clausura ===
Pos	Team	Pld	W	D	L	GF	GA	GD	Pts
1	Libertad	22	12	8	2	35	17	+18	44
2	Guaraní	22	12	7	3	36	17	+19	43
3	Cerro Porteño	22	10	7	5	32	26	+6	37
4	Sol de América	22	12	3	7	37	30	+7	36
5	Nacional	22	8	8	6	23	22	+1	32
6	Tacuary	22	9	4	9	23	24	−1	31
7	Olimpia	22	7	7	8	33	31	+2	28
8	12 de Octubre	22	8	4	10	27	33	−6	28
9	3 de Febrero	22	6	6	10	27	31	−4	24
10	Sportivo Luqueño	22	6	6	10	27	38	−11	24
11	2 de Mayo	22	4	10	8	26	33	−7	22
12	Silvio Pettirossi	22	1	6	15	15	39	−24	9

=== Aggregate table ===
Pos	Team	Pld	W	D	L	GF	GA	GD	Pts	Qualification
1	Libertad	44	30	11	3	88	30	+58	101	Qualified to 2009 Copa Libertadores and 2009 Copa Sudamericana
2	Guaraní	44	23	10	11	67	43	+24	79	Qualified to 2009 Copa Libertadores
3	Nacional	44	22	11	11	68	47	+21	77	Qualified to 2009 Copa Libertadores
4	Cerro Porteño	44	21	12	11	66	52	+14	75	Qualified to 2009 Copa Sudamericana
5	Sol de América	44	19	6	19	77	69	+8	63	
6	Olimpia	44	14	12	18	56	63	−7	54	
7	Tacuary	44	14	12	18	47	58	−11	54	
8	2 de Mayo	44	13	14	17	53	59	−6	53	
9	3 de Febrero	44	14	9	21	59	71	−12	51	
10	Sportivo Luqueño	44	12	13	19	60	82	−22	49	
11	12 de Octubre	44	12	12	20	56	73	−17	48	
12	Silvio Pettirossi	44	4	10	30	36	86	−50	22	

=== Qualification to international competitions ===
- Libertad qualified to the 2009 Copa Libertadores (by winning the Torneo Apertura and Clausura) and the 2009 Copa Sudamericana.
- Club Guaraní qualified to the 2009 Copa Libertadores as the second best finisher in the aggregate points table.
- Nacional qualified to the 2009 Copa Libertadores as the third best finisher in the aggregate points table.
- Cerro Porteño qualified to the 2009 Copa Sudamericana as the fourth best finisher in the aggregate points table.

== Relegation ==
The team with the worst average points over the last three years is automatically relegated to the second division league, and the second-worst team plays a playoff match against the second division runner-up. The winner of the playoff match plays in the first division the following year.

Team	Average	Points	Played	2006	2007	2008
Libertad	2.179	279	126	83/40	95/44	101/44
Cerro Porteño	2.023	259	126	92/40	92/44	75/44
Nacional	1.484	190	126	53/40	60/44	77/44
Olimpia	1.406	180	126	50/40	76/44	54/44
Sol de América	1.363	120	86	N/A	57/44	63/44
Sportivo Luqueño	1.335	171	126	56/40	66/44	49/44
Tacuary	1.335	171	126	66/40	51/44	54/44
Guaraní	1.265	162	126	42/40	41/44	79/44
2 de Mayo	1.126	142	126	58/40	34/44	50/42
12 de Octubre	1.132	145	126	42/40	49/44	53/44
3 de Febrero	1.062	136	126	36/40	49/44	51/44
Silvio Pettirossi	0.500	22	42	N/A	N/A	22/44

To promotion game (against second division runner-up)
Relegated to Liga Paraguaya: Segunda División

- Last Updated: December 24, 2008. * League Stats (in Spanish)

=== Promotion game ===
The promotion was played between 3 de Febrero and the second division runner-up General Caballero ZC. The first game ended with a 3-0 score favorable to 3 de Febrero, while the second finished 2-1 in favor of General Caballero. Since the aggregate score was 4-2 for 3 de Febrero, they remain in the first division.

== Paraguayan teams in international competitions ==
Team	Copa Libertadores 2008	Copa Sudamericana 2008
Libertad	Group Stage (finished 4th in the group)	First Round (eliminated by Defensor Sporting)
Club Sportivo Luqueño	Group Stage (finished 3rd in the group)	N/A
Cerro Porteño	Preliminary Round (eliminated by Cruzeiro)	N/A
Olimpia	N/A	First Round (eliminated by Universidad Católica)

== Paraguay national team ==
The following table lists all the games played by the Paraguay national football team in official competitions during 2008.

Date	Venue	Opponents	Score	Comp	Paraguay scorers	Report
February 7, 2008		Honduras	2 - 0	Friendly		
March 27, 2008		South Africa	3 - 0	Friendly		
May 22, 2008	Nippatsu Mitsuzawa Stadium; Japan	Ivory Coast	1 - 1	2008 Kirin Cup	Cristian Bogado 77'	
May 27, 2008	Saitama Stadium 2002; Japan	Japan	0 - 0	2008 Kirin Cup		
June 1, 2008	Stadium Municipal; France	France	0 - 0	Friendly		
June 15, 2008	Defensores del Chaco; Asunción, Paraguay	Brazil	2 - 0	WCQ 2010	Santa Cruz 26'; Cabañas 49'	Report
June 18, 2008	Estadio Hernando Siles; La Paz, Bolivia	Bolivia	4 - 2	WCQ 2010	Santa Cruz 66'; Haedo Valdez 82'	Report
August 21, 2008		Saudi Arabia	1 - 1	Friendly	Cristian Riveros	
September 6, 2008	Estadio Monumental; Buenos Aires, Argentina	Argentina	1 - 1	WCQ2010	Heinze 13' (o.g.)	Report
September 9, 2008	Defensores del Chaco; Asunción, Paraguay	Venezuela	2 - 0	WCQ2010	Riveros 28'; Haedo Valdez 45'	Report
October 11, 2008	El Campín; Bogotá, Colombia	Colombia	0 - 1	WCQ2010	Cabañas 9'	Report
October 15, 2008	Defensores del Chaco; Asunción, Paraguay	Peru	1 - 0	WCQ2010	Cardozo 81'	Report
November 19, 2008	Sultan Qaboos Sports Complex; Muscat, Oman	Oman	0 - 1	F	Vera 37'	N/A

KEY: F = Friendly match; WCQ2010 = 2010 FIFA World Cup qualification
