= Pablo Pintos =

Uruguayan footballer (born 1987)

Personal information
- Full name: Pablo César Pintos Cabral
- Date of birth: 1 July 1987 (age 39)
- Place of birth: Montevideo, Uruguay
- Height: 1.82 m (6 ft 0 in)
- Position: Right back

Team information
- Current team: CA Cerro
- Number: 19

Senior career*
Years	Team	Apps	(Gls)
2006–2009	Defensor	50	(3)
2009–2010	San Lorenzo	33	(3)
2010–2012	Getafe	6	(0)
2012	→ Defensor (loan)	13	(0)
2012–2014	Kasımpaşa	7	(1)
2013	→ Tigre (loan)	2	(0)
2014	Defensor	8	(0)
2014–2015	San Jose Earthquakes	6	(0)
2016–2017	Liverpool	12	(0)
2017–	CA Cerro	2	(0)
- * Club domestic league appearances and goals as of 20 March 2017 (UTC)

Pablo César Pintos Cabral (born 1 July 1987) is an Uruguayan footballer who plays for CA Cerro.

== Career ==
Pintos began his playing career in 2006 with Defensor, he was part of two championship winning squads during his time at the club. They won the Apertura 2007 championship, Uruguayan Championship 2008, and Clausura 2009 championship. He scored a total of 4 goals in 67 appearances for the club in all competitions.

In 2009 Pintos joined Argentine club San Lorenzo de Almagro by signing 50% rights for reported US$700,000 to $800,000. He made his competitive debut for the club on 18 August 2009 in a 2–1 away defeat to Club Atlético Tigre in Copa Sudamericana 2009. On his league debut for San Lorenzo, Pintos scored his first goal for the club in a 3–1 win against Atlético Tucumán on 22 August 2009.

In summer 2010 Pintos was signed by Lazio, but new non-EU policy of Italian Football Federation made Lazio unable to register two non-EU new signing after signed Hernanes. Instead, Pintos signed a contract with club Getafe.

Pintos signed with the San Jose Earthquakes in September 2014, and was released the following February after a short stint with the club.

== Honours ==
Season	Team	Title
2007 Apertura	Defensor Sporting	Uruguayan Primera División
2007 Championship	Defensor Sporting	Uruguayan Primera División
2009 Clausura	Defensor Sporting	Uruguayan Primera División
