= Bosco Frontán =

Uruguayan footballer (born 1984)

Personal information
- Full name: Silvio Bosco Frontán Vega
- Date of birth: 24 March 1984 (age 42)
- Place of birth: Paysandú, Uruguay
- Height: 1.76 m (5 ft 9 in)
- Position: Forward

Senior career*
Years	Team	Apps	(Gls)
2001–2002	Platense		
2003-2005	Paysandú Bella Vista		
2006	Querétaro FC	17	(4)
2006–2007	Gallos Tijuana	20	(5)
2007	Club Celaya	13	(5)
2007	Dorados de Sinaloa	17	(3)
2008	Querétaro FC	17	(2)
2008–2010	Jaibos Tampico Madero	24	(12)
2010	Peñarol	8	(1)
2011	Cerro	17	(1)
2011–2012	Bella Vista	1	(0)
2012–2013	Universitario de Sucre	13	(6)
2013–2014	Melgar	34	(7)
2014–2015	Deportivo Pasto		
- * Club domestic league appearances and goals as of January 20, 2014

Silvio Bosco Frontán Vega (born March 24, 1984, in Paysandú, Uruguay) is an Uruguayan soccer player currently playing for Deportivo Pasto in the Colombian Categoría Primera A.

He scored a goal in the 2006 tournament final between Querétaro FC and Puebla, playing for the former. During his career, he has played in several teams in Uruguay, Argentina Mexico and nowadays, Uruguay. In September 2012 signed for the club Universitario de Sucre of Bolivia.

== Career ==
These are the teams which Bosco has played for.

Team	Country	Period
Platense	Argentina	2001–2002
Paysandu Bella Vista	Uruguay	
Club Tijuana	Mexico	2006
Club Celaya	Mexico	2007
Dorados de Sinaloa	Mexico	2007
Querétaro F.C.	Mexico	2008
La Piedad	Mexico	2008
Peñarol	Uruguay	2010
Cerro	Uruguay	2011
Bella Vista	Uruguay	2011–2012
Universitario de Sucre	Bolivia	2012
FBC Melgar	Peru	2013
Deportivo Pasto	Colombia	2013–
