= 2009 Copa Sudamericana =

2009 Copa Nissan Sudamericana de Clubes 2009 Copa Nissan Sul-americana do Clubes

Tournament details
- Dates: August 4 - December 2
- Teams: 31 (from 10 associations)

Final positions
- Champions: (Ecuador) LDU Quito (1st title)
- Runners-up: (Brazil) Fluminense

Tournament statistics
- Matches played: 60
- Goals scored: 148 (2.47 per match)
- Attendance: 639,150 (10,653 per match)
- Top scorer: (Argentina) Claudio Bieler (8 goals)

The 2009 Copa Sudamericana de Clubes (officially the 2009 Copa Nissan Sudamericana de Clubes for sponsorship reasons) is the 8th edition of the CONMEBOL's secondary international club tournament. Internacional were the defending champions, having won the trophy the previous season. Ecuadorian side LDU Quito won the 2009 tournament, becoming the first Ecuadorian winners of the trophy.

From this edition onward, CONCACAF teams, which have participated in the tournament since 2005, will no longer be participating because of the format change in the CONCACAF Champions League, which conflicted with scheduling. This will also mark the last tournament in which Argentine clubs River Plate and Boca Juniors will be invited to participate without qualification. Further changes include the additional allocation of berths (1) to all the countries except Brazil and Argentina.

== Qualified teams ==
Association	Team	Qualify method
(Argentina) Argentina 6 berths	Lanús	2008–09 Primera División 1st place overall
(Argentina) Argentina 6 berths	Vélez Sársfield	2008–09 Primera División 2nd place overall
(Argentina) Argentina 6 berths	San Lorenzo	2008–09 Primera División 3rd place overall
(Argentina) Argentina 6 berths	Tigre	2008–09 Primera División 4th place overall
(Argentina) Argentina 6 berths	Boca Juniors	Invited
(Argentina) Argentina 6 berths	River Plate	Invited
(Bolivia) Bolivia 2 berths	La Paz	2008 Apertura 2nd place
(Bolivia) Bolivia 2 berths	Blooming	2008 Clausura 2nd place
(Brazil) Brazil 8 + 1 berths	Internacional	2008 Copa Sudamericana champion
(Brazil) Brazil 8 + 1 berths	Flamengo	2008 Série A 5th place
(Brazil) Brazil 8 + 1 berths	Botafogo	2008 Série A 7th place
(Brazil) Brazil 8 + 1 berths	Goiás	2008 Série A 8th place
(Brazil) Brazil 8 + 1 berths	Coritiba	2008 Série A 9th place
(Brazil) Brazil 8 + 1 berths	Vitória	2008 Série A 10th place
(Brazil) Brazil 8 + 1 berths	Atlético Mineiro	2008 Série A 12th place
(Brazil) Brazil 8 + 1 berths	Atlético Paranaense	2008 Série A 13th place
(Brazil) Brazil 8 + 1 berths	Fluminense	2008 Série A 14th place
(Chile) Chile 2 berths	Unión Española	1st in 2009 Apertura general table
(Chile) Chile 2 berths	Universidad de Chile	2009 Copa Sudamericana playoff winner
(Colombia) Colombia 2 berths	Deportivo Cali	2008 Primera A 2nd best-placed non-champion
(Colombia) Colombia 2 berths	La Equidad	2008 Copa Colombia champion
(Ecuador) Ecuador 2 berths	Emelec	2009 Serie A First Stage winner
(Ecuador) Ecuador 2 berths	LDU Quito	2009 Serie A First Stage runner-up
(Paraguay) Paraguay 2 berths	Libertad	Apertura or Clausura champion with most points in 2008 Primera División
(Paraguay) Paraguay 2 berths	Cerro Porteño	2008 Primera División 3rd best-placed non-champion
(Peru) Peru 2 berths	Cienciano	2008 Descentralizado 2nd best-placed non-champion
(Peru) Peru 2 berths	Alianza Atlético	2008 Descentralizado 3rd best-placed non-champion
(Uruguay) Uruguay 2 berths	River Plate	2009 Liguilla Pre-Libertadores 3rd place
(Uruguay) Uruguay 2 berths	Liverpool	2009 Liguilla Pre-Libertadores 4th place
(Venezuela) Venezuela 2 berths	Deportivo Anzoátegui	2008 Copa Venezuela champion
(Venezuela) Venezuela 2 berths	Zamora	2008–09 Primera División 2nd best-placed non-finalist

== First stage ==
The first stage began on August 4, and ended on September 17. Team #1 played the first leg at home. All teams, except for defending champion Internacional, entered the tournament in the First Stage.

Team #1	Points earned	Team #2	1st leg	2nd leg
Atlético Mineiro (Brazil)	2–2 (5–6 p)	(Brazil) Goiás	1–1	1–1
La Equidad (Colombia)	1–4	(Chile) Unión Española	2–2	0–1
Vitória (Brazil)	3–3 (5–3 p)	(Brazil) Coritiba	2–0	0–2
Universidad de Chile	6–0	(Colombia) Deportivo Cali	2–1	1–0
Fluminense (Brazil)	(a) 2–2	(Brazil) Flamengo	0–0	1–1
Liverpool (Uruguay)	1–4	(Peru) Cienciano	0–0	0–2
River Plate (Argentina)	0–6	(Argentina) Lanús	1–2	0–1
Zamora (Venezuela)	0–6	(Ecuador) Emelec	0–1	1–2
Atlético Paranaense (Brazil)	1–4	(Brazil) Botafogo	0–0	2–3
LDU Quito (Ecuador)	4–1	(Paraguay) Libertad	1–0	1–1
Tigre (Argentina)	3–3 (a)	(Argentina) San Lorenzo	2–1	0–1
Alianza Atlético (Peru)	4–1	(Venezuela) Deportivo Anzoátegui	0–0	2–1
Blooming (Bolivia)	0–6	(Uruguay) River Plate	0–3	1–2
Boca Juniors (Argentina)	1–4	(Argentina) Vélez Sársfield	1–1	0–1
Cerro Porteño (Paraguay)	6–0	(Bolivia) La Paz	2–0	2–1

== Final stages ==
Round of 16
1	(Brazil) Goiás	0	3	3
16	(Paraguay) Cerro Porteño (a)	2	1	3
8	(Ecuador) Emelec	0	2	2
9	(Brazil) Botafogo	2	1	3
5	(Brazil) Fluminense	2	4	6
12	(Peru) Alianza Atlético	2	1	3
4	Universidad de Chile	1	1	2
13	(Brazil) Internacional	1	0	1
2	(Chile) Unión Española	2	2	4
15	(Argentina) Vélez Sársfield	3	2	5
7	(Argentina) Lanús	0	1	1
10	(Ecuador) LDU Quito	4	1	5
3	(Brazil) Vitória	1	1	2
14	(Uruguay) River Plate	4	1	5
6	(Peru) Cienciano	0	0	0
11	(Argentina) San Lorenzo	3	2	5

Quarterfinals
16	(Paraguay) Cerro Porteño	2	3	5
9	(Brazil) Botafogo	1	1	2
5	(Brazil) Fluminense	2	1	3
4	Universidad de Chile	2	0	2
15	(Argentina) Vélez Sársfield	1	1	2
10	(Ecuador) LDU Quito	1	2	3
14	(Uruguay) River Plate (p)	0	1	1 (7)
11	(Argentina) San Lorenzo	1	0	1 (6)

Semifinals
16	(Paraguay) Cerro Porteño	0	1	1
5	(Brazil) Fluminense	1	2	3
10	(Ecuador) LDU Quito	1	7	8
14	(Uruguay) River Plate	2	0	2

Finals
5	(Brazil) Fluminense	1	3	4
10	(Ecuador) LDU Quito	5	0	5

=== Round of 16 ===
The first leg of the round of 16 was played from September 22 to September 24. The second leg was played from September 30 to October 1. Team #1 played the first leg at home.

Team #1	Points earned	Team #2	1st leg	2nd leg
Cerro Porteño (Paraguay)	3–3 (a)	(Brazil) Goiás	2–0	1–3
Vélez Sarsfield (Argentina)	5–4	(Chile) Unión Española	3–2	2–2
River Plate (Uruguay)	5–2	(Brazil) Vitória	4–1	1–1
Internacional (Brazil)	1–2	Universidad de Chile	1–1	0–1
Alianza Atlético (Peru)	3–6	(Brazil) Fluminense	2–2	1–4
San Lorenzo (Argentina)	5–0	(Peru) Cienciano	3–0	2–0
LDU Quito (Ecuador)	5–1	(Argentina) Lanús	4–0	1–1
Botafogo (Brazil)	3–2	(Ecuador) Emelec	2–0	1–2

=== Quarterfinals ===
The first leg of the Quarterfinals was played from October 20–22. The second leg was played from November 4–5. Team #1 played the first leg at home.

Team #1	Points earned	Team #2	1st leg	2nd leg
Cerro Porteño (Paraguay)	5–2	(Brazil) Botafogo	2–1	3–1
Vélez Sarsfield (Argentina)	2–3	(Ecuador) LDU Quito	1–1	1–2
River Plate (Uruguay)	1–1 (7–6 p)	(Argentina) San Lorenzo	0–1	1–0
Fluminense (Brazil)	3–2	Universidad de Chile	2–2	1–0

=== Semifinals ===
The first leg was played from November 11–12. The second leg was played from November 18–19. Team #1 played the first leg at home.

Team #1	Points earned	Team #2	1st leg	2nd leg
Cerro Porteño (Paraguay)	1–3	(Brazil) Fluminense	0–1	1–2
River Plate (Uruguay)	2–8	(Ecuador) LDU Quito	2–1	0–7

=== Finals ===
The Finals were played on November 25 and December 2. Just like the 2008 Copa Libertadores Finals, both teams played against each other in a final.

November 25, 2009
18:50 (UTC-5)

LDU Quito (Ecuador)	5–1	(Brazil) Fluminense
Méndez 21', 44', 60'; Salas 78' de la Cruz 87'	Report	Marquinho 1'

Estadio Casa Blanca, Quito
Attendance: 55,000
Referee: Roberto Silvera (Uruguay)

December 2, 2009
21:50 (UTC-2)

Fluminense (Brazil)	3–0	(Ecuador) LDU Quito
Diguinho 14'; Fred 43'; Gum 72'	Report

Estádio Mário Filho (Maracanã), Rio de Janeiro
Attendance: 65,822
Referee: Carlos Amarilla (Paraguay)

== Top goalscorers ==
Pos	Name	Club	Goals
1	(Argentina) Claudio Bieler	(Ecuador) LDU Quito	8
2	(Ecuador) Édison Méndez	(Ecuador) LDU Quito	7
3	(Argentina) Jorge Córdoba	(Uruguay) River Plate	5
3	(Brazil) Fred	(Brazil) Fluminense	5
5	(Brazil) Felipe	(Brazil) Goiás	4
5	(Uruguay) Juan Manuel Olivera	Universidad de Chile	4
7	(Argentina) Gustavo Canales	(Chile) Unión Española	3
7	(Brazil) André Lima	(Brazil) Botafogo	3
7	(Uruguay) Hernán López	(Argentina) Vélez Sársfield	3
7	(Argentina) Roberto Nanni	(Paraguay) Cerro Porteño	3
7	(Peru) Marcio Valverde	(Peru) Alianza Atlético	3
