= Ronald Segovia =

Bolivian footballer (born 1985)

Personal information
- Full name: Ronald Segovia Calzadilla
- Date of birth: 17 January 1985 (age 41)
- Place of birth: Santa Cruz de la Sierra, Bolivia
- Height: 1.67 m (5 ft 5 1/2 in)
- Position: Attacking midfielder

Senior career*
Years	Team	Apps	(Gls)
2009–2010	La Paz FC	63	(5)
2011–2012	Aurora	57	(10)
2012–2013	Blooming	26	(4)
2014	San Jose	18	(0)
2015–2016	Wilstermann	40	(0)
2016	Petrolero	36	(1)
2016–2020	San Jose	46	(1)

International career^{‡}
2011–2013	Bolivia	6	(0)
- * Club domestic league appearances and goals as of 13 September 2021 ‡ National team caps and goals as of 14 June 2018

Ronald Segovia (born 17 January 1985) in Villa Montes, Tarija, Bolivia, is a footballer who plays as an attacking midfielder. He currently a free agent.

== Club career ==
=== La Paz ===
In 2009, he signed up for the Bolivian club La Paz where he managed 5 goals in 63 games.

=== Aurora ===
In 2011, he signed for Liga de Fútbol Profesional Boliviano club Aurora. In June 2012, Segovia signed a one-year contract with Club Blooming.

== International career ==
On 11 November 2011 he made his debut for the Bolivia national football team in a 2014 World Cup qualifier match against Argentina
