= Diego Rosende =

Chilean footballer (born 1986)

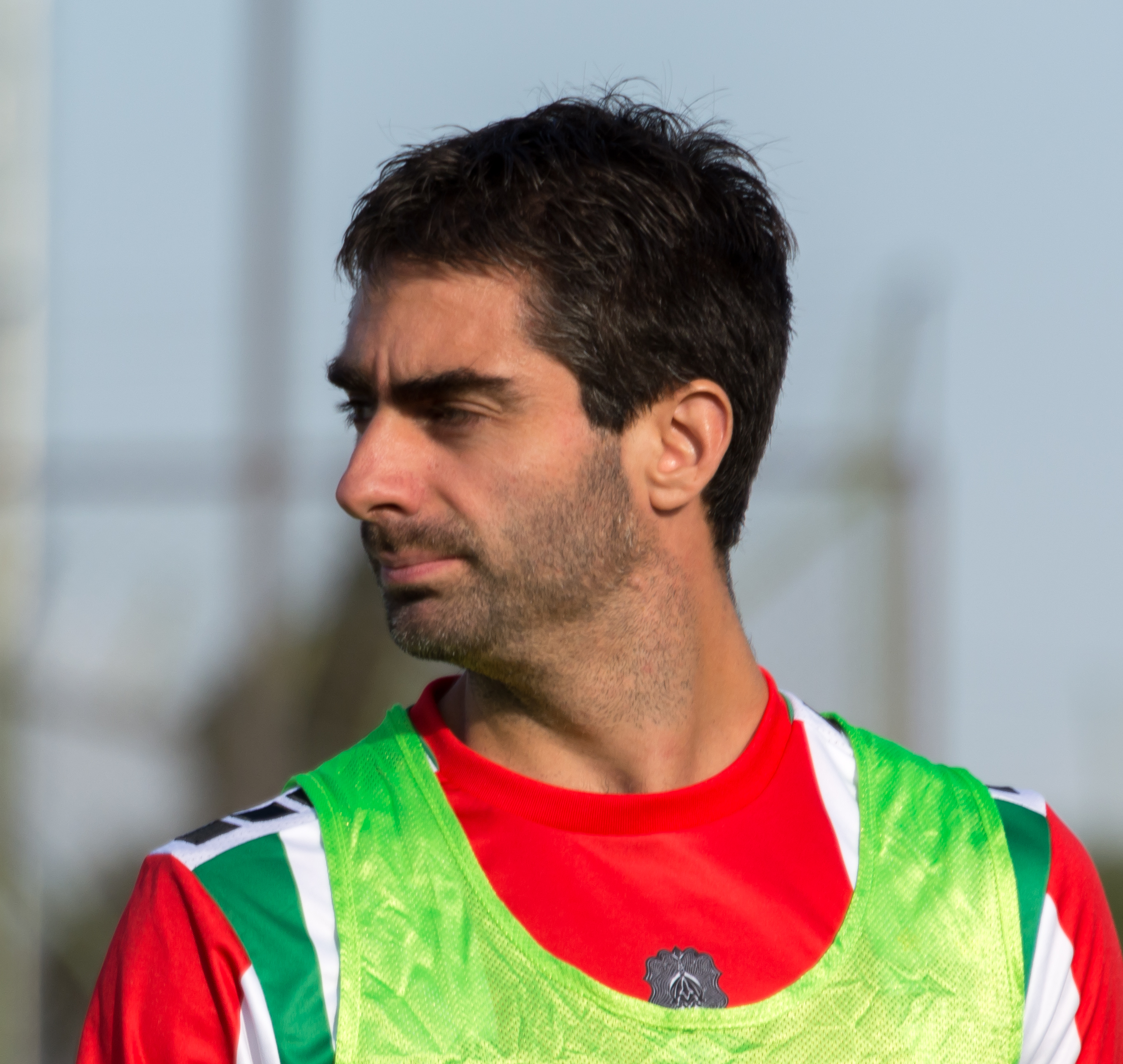

Personal information
- Full name: Diego Rosende Lagos
- Date of birth: 11 February 1986 (age 40)
- Place of birth: Santiago, Chile
- Height: 1.72 m (5 ft 7 1/2 in)
- Positions: Midfielder; right-back

Youth career
- 2000–2006: Universidad Católica

Senior career*
Years	Team	Apps	(Gls)
2006–2010	Universidad Católica	40	(0)
2007	→ Coquimbo Unido (loan)	16	(0)
2009	→ Unión Española (loan)	34	(1)
2011–2012	Deportes La Serena	37	(3)
2012–2019	Palestino	156	(4)
2020–2021	Magallanes	21	(0)
Total		304	(8)
- * Club domestic league appearances and goals as of 31 March 2021

Diego Rosende Lagos (born 11 February 1986) is a Chilean former professional footballer.

== Honours ==
=== Club ===
Universidad Católica

- Primera División (2): 2005 Clausura, 2010

Palestino

- Copa Chile (1): 2018
