= Antonio Pacheco (footballer, born 1976) =

Uruguayan footballer (born 1976)

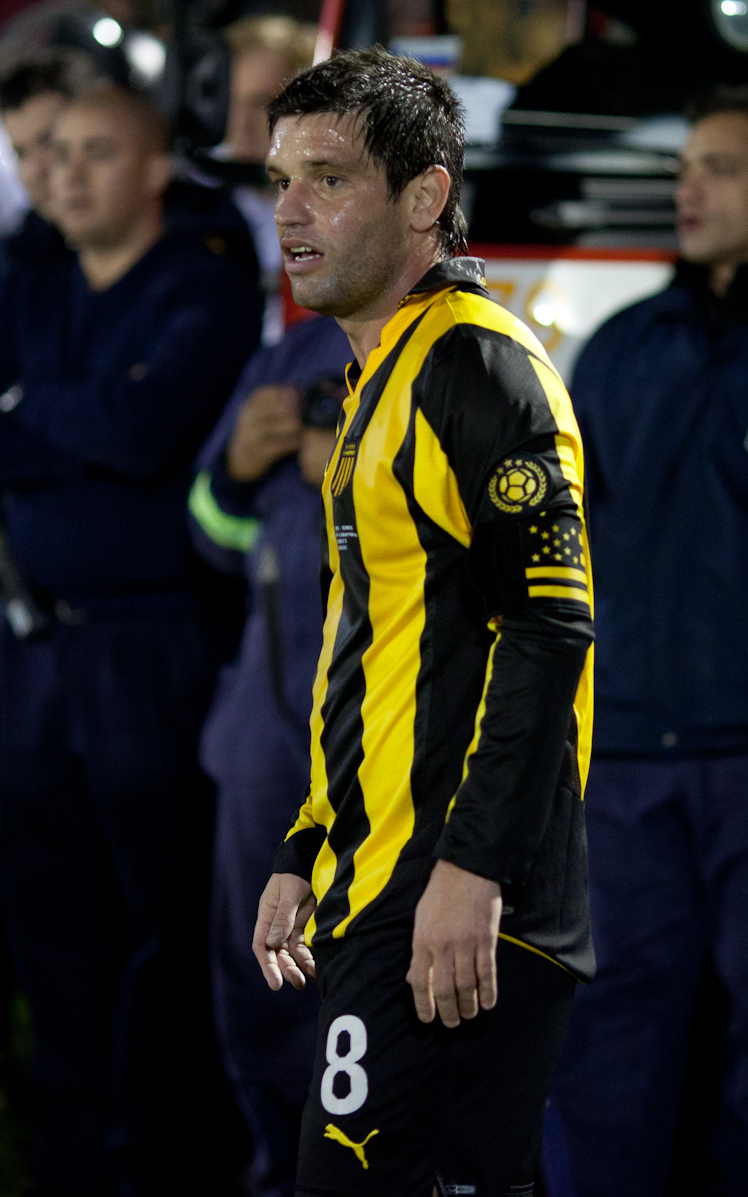
- Pacheco in action for Peñarol in 2011

Personal information
- Full name: Antonio Pacheco d'Agosti
- Date of birth: 11 April 1976 (age 50)
- Place of birth: Montevideo, Uruguay
- Height: 1.71 m (5 ft 7 1/2 in)
- Position: Forward

Team information
- Current team: Central Español (manager)

Youth career
- Peñarol

Senior career*
Years	Team	Apps	(Gls)
1994–2000	Peñarol	96	(38)
2001–2005	Inter Milan	1	(0)
2002	→ Espanyol (loan)	13	(3)
2003	→ Peñarol (loan)	15	(10)
2003–2005	→ Albacete (loan)	67	(19)
2005–2006	Albacete	19	(4)
2006	→ Alavés (loan)	0	(0)
2007	Gimnasia La Plata	8	(0)
2007–2011	Peñarol	111	(48)
2011–2012	Montevideo Wanderers	28	(10)
2012–2015	Peñarol	72	(22)
Total		430	(154)

International career
1997–2004	Uruguay	11	(3)

Managerial career
- 2024–2025: Montevideo Wanderers
- 2026–: Central Español
- * Club domestic league appearances and goals

Antonio Pacheco d'Agosti (born 11 April 1976) is a Uruguayan football manager and former player who played as a forward. He is the current manager of Central Español.

Pacheco also held an Italian passport. He started his 21-year professional career with Peñarol, appearing in more than 300 official matches for the club. Additionally, he played abroad in Italy, Spain and Argentina.

== Club career ==
Born in Montevideo, Pacheco was signed by Inter Milan in January 2001 after stellar performances at local Peñarol, with a contract running until 30 June 2005. However, he made only one Serie A appearance with the Italians when he replaced Vladimir Jugovic in the away game at Lazio, and served consecutive loans in the following years, with Peñarol but also in Spain, first with Espanyol then Albacete, with the latter buying the player permanently afterwards.

In January 2006, as Albacete was now in the second division, Pacheco wanted out, and was eventually loaned to Alavés until the end of the season. The move was a disaster individually (no La Liga appearances) and collectively (relegation).

After a brief spell in Argentina with Gimnasia La Plata, Pacheco returned in 2007 for a third stint with Peñarol: he scored 12 Primera División goals in the 2008–09 campaign, including twice in a 2–3 away loss against city rivals Club Nacional de Football on 24 May 2009, one through a penalty kick.

After reaching the 2011 Copa Libertadores final, 35-year-old Pacheco signed with Montevideo Wanderers. In June 2012 he returned to his main club Peñarol, retiring three years later at 39 even though he still received offers to continue.

== International career ==
During seven years, Pacheco gathered 11 appearances for Uruguay, scoring three times. His debut came on 12 October 1997, in a 0–0 in Argentina for the 1998 FIFA World Cup qualifiers.

Afterwards, Pacheco was summoned for the final squad at the 1999 Copa América, playing three matches for the eventual runners-up.

== Career statistics ==
=== International ===
Appearances and goals by national team and year
National team	Year	Apps	Goals
Uruguay	1997	2	1
Uruguay	1999	8	2
Uruguay	2004	1	0
Total		11	3

Scores and results list Uruguay's goal tally first, score column indicates score after each Pacheco goal.

List of international goals scored by Antonio Pacheco
No.	Date	Venue	Opponent	Score	Result	Competition
1	13 December 1997	King Fahd Sports City, Riyadh, Saudi Arabia	United Arab Emirates	2–0	2–0	1997 FIFA Confederations Cup
2	18 August 1999	Estadio Centenario, Montevideo, Uruguay	Costa Rica	4–1	5–4	Friendly
3	8 September 1999	Estadio Centenario, Montevideo, Uruguay	Venezuela	1–0	2–0	Friendly

== Honours ==
=== Club ===
Peñarol

- Uruguayan Primera División: 1994, 1995, 1996, 1997, 1999, 2003, 2009–10, 2012–13
- Copa Libertadores: Runner-up 2011

=== International ===
Uruguay

- Copa América: Runner-up 1999
