= Paulo Sérgio (footballer, born 1978) =

Brazilian footballer

Personal information
- Full name: Paulo Sérgio Rocha
- Date of birth: 1 October 1978 (age 48)
- Place of birth: Andradina, Brazil
- Height: 1.70 m (5 ft 7 in)
- Position: Right-back

Youth career
- 1996–1997: Comercial-MS

Senior career*
Years	Team	Apps	(Gls)
1998	Paranaiense-PR		
1999	Andradina-SP		
1999	Marcílio Dias		
2000	Comercial-SP		
2001	Avaí		
2001	Marcílio Dias		
2002–2005	Figueirense	132	(5)
2005–2006	→ Noroeste (loan)		
2006–2007	São Caetano		
2007–2008	Palmeiras	25	(1)
2008	→ Grêmio (loan)	27	(1)
2009	Vasco da Gama	24	(1)
2010–2011	Portuguesa	35	(1)
2011	Americana	21	(0)
2012	Ceará	14	(0)
2013–2016	CRB	54	(0)
2016	Mirassol	14	(0)
2016–2017	Murici	29	(3)
2018	Cabofriense	3	(0)
- * Club domestic league appearances and goals

Paulo Sérgio Rocha (born 1 October 1978) most commonly known as Paulo Sérgio, is a Brazilian former professional footballer who played as a right-back.

== Honours ==
- Campeonato Brasileiro Série B: 2009
