= Gonzalo Noguera =

Uruguayan footballer (born 1977)

Personal information
- Full name: Gonzalo Pablo Noguera Delucchi
- Date of birth: 16 May 1977 (age 49)
- Place of birth: Montevideo, Uruguay
- Height: 1.88 m (6 ft 2 in)
- Position: Goalkeeper

Youth career
- Montevideo Wanderers

Senior career*
| Years | Team | Apps | (Gls) |
| 1995–2001 | Montevideo Wanderers | | |
| 2001–2002 | Deportes La Serena | | |
| 2003–2007 | Miramar Misiones | 26 | (0) |
| 2007–2008 | Progreso | 18 | (0) |
| 2008–2010 | Peñarol | 5 | (0) |
| 2010 | Deportivo Maldonado | 2 | (0) |
| 2011 | Miramar Misiones | 20 | (0) |
- * Club domestic league appearances and goals

Gonzalo Pablo Noguera Delucchi (born May 16, 1977, in Montevideo, Uruguay) is a former Uruguayan footballer who played as a goalkeeper.

== Teams ==
- (Uruguay) Montevideo Wanderers 1995–2001
- (Chile) Deportes La Serena 2001–2002
- (Uruguay) Miramar Misiones 2003–2007
- (Uruguay) Progreso 2007–2008
- (Uruguay) Peñarol 2008–2010
- (Uruguay) Deportivo Maldonado 2010
- (Uruguay) Miramar Misiones 2011

== Post-retirement ==
Noguera works as a goalkeeping coach.
