= Mateo Apolonio =

Argentine footballer (born 2010)

Personal information
- Full name: Mateo Apolonio Berruezo
- Date of birth: 10 April 2010 (age 16)
- Place of birth: Argentina
- Position: Defender

Team information
- Current team: Deportivo Riestra

Senior career*
Years	Team	Apps	(Gls)
2024–	Deportivo Riestra	1	(0)
- * Club domestic league appearances and goals

Mateo Apolonio Berruezo (born 10 April 2010) is an Argentine footballer who plays as a defender for Deportivo Riestra.

== Early life ==
Apolonio was born in 2010 in Argentina. He played futsal as a child.

== Career ==
Apolonio started his career with Argentine side Deportivo Riestra. On 16 May 2024, he debuted for the club under coach Cristian Fabbiani during a 0–1 loss to Newell's.

== Style of play ==
Apolonio mainly operates as a defender. He is left-footed.
