= Wellington (footballer, born 1989) =

Brazilian footballer

Personal information
- Full name: Wellington Oliveira dos Reis
- Date of birth: January 9, 1989 (age 37)
- Place of birth: Cuiabá, Brazil
- Height: 1.87 m (6 ft 2 in)
- Position: Central defender

Youth career
- 2005–2007: Cruzeiro

Senior career*
Years	Team	Apps	(Gls)
2007–	Cruzeiro	1	(0)
2009–2010	→ Botafogo (loan)	25	(2)
2010	→ Atlético Goianiense (loan)	0	(0)
2011	→ Ponte Preta (loan)		
2012	→ Nacional-MG (loan)		
2012	→ Grêmio Barueri (loan)		
2013	→ Mixto Esporte Clube (loan)	0	(0)
- * Club domestic league appearances and goals

Wellington Oliveira dos Reis (born January 9, 1989), known as Wellington, is a Brazilian former professional footballer who played as a central defender.
