= Nicolás Guevara =

Argentine footballer

Alfredo Nicolás Guevara (born February 1, 1982) is an Argentine former professional footballer who played as a forward.

== Teams ==
- San Lorenzo 2000–2004
- Nueva Chicago 2004–2005
- Huracán 2005
- San Martín de Mendoza 2006
- Douglas Haig 2007
- San Martín de Mendoza 2008
- Temperley 2008–2009
- Rampla Juniors 2009–2010
- Liverpool 2011
- Rampla Juniors 2011
- Cerro Largo 2012
- Rampla Juniors 2012–2013
- River Plate Ecuador 2013–2015
