= Fabricio Núñez =

Uruguayan footballer (born 1985)

Personal information
- Full name: Fabricio Damián Núñez Lozano
- Date of birth: November 4, 1985 (age 40)
- Place of birth: Mercedes, Uruguay
- Height: 1.75 m (5 ft 9 in)
- Position: Striker

Senior career*
| Years | Team | Apps | (Gls) |
| 2006–2008 | River Plate (Uruguay) | 53 | (13) |
| 2009–2010 | Cerro Largo | 29 | (16) |
| 2010–2011 | Godoy Cruz | 15 | (2) |
| 2011–2012 | Unión de Santa Fe | 15 | (0) |
| 2012–2013 | Defensa y Justicia | 5 | (0) |
| 2013–2014 | Cerro Largo | 30 | (7) |
| 2014–2015 | CA Cerro | 12 | (1) |
| 2015–2016 | Fuerza Amarilla | 31 | (3) |
| 2016 | Club Oriental | 13 | (4) |
| 2016–2017 | El Tanque Sisley | 30 | (8) |
| 2017 | Luftëtari | 4 | (0) |
- * Club domestic league appearances and goals as of 7 January 2018

Fabricio Damián Núñez Lozano (born November 4, 1985), known as Fabricio Núñez, is a Uruguayan footballer. He last played for Luftëtari Gjirokastër.

== Career ==
After four years of professional football in Uruguay (playing for River Plate and Cerro Largo), Núñez joined Argentine Primera División side Godoy Cruz for the 2010–11 season. In June 2011 he joined Unión de Santa Fe for the 2011–12 season.
