= Gabriel Silva (footballer, born 1989) =

Brazilian footballer (born 1989)

Personal information
- Full name: Gabriel Henrique Silva
- Date of birth: March 4, 1989 (age 37)
- Place of birth: Rio de Janeiro, Brazil
- Height: 1.81 m (5 ft 11 1/2 in)
- Position: Left back

Youth career
- 2007: CFZ
- 2008: Botafogo

Senior career*
Years	Team	Apps	(Gls)
2009–2011	Botafogo		
2010	→ Duque de Caxias (loan)		
2010	→ Ceará (loan)		
2011	→ Duque de Caxias (loan)		
2011–2012	Corinthians		
2012	Grêmio Barueri		
2012	Guarani		
2012–2013	Luziânia		
2013–2014	Madureira		
2015	Olaria		
2015	Aimoré		
2016	Central de Caruaru		
2017	7 de Abril		

International career
2022	Pirapetinga Esporte Clube		
- * Club domestic league appearances and goals

Gabriel Henrique Silva, sometimes known as just Gabriel, is a Brazilian professional footballer who plays as left back.

== Career ==
Created in the youth ranks of CFZ do Rio, the athlete was hired by Botafogo in 2008, the year he competed in the tournament Octavio Pinto Guimarães.

In 2009, ascended the professional team and Botafogo FR logo on his debut before the Tigers Sports Club of Brazil scored a goal. In 2010, he was cast champion championship.

In July 2010 the player was loaned to Ceará, by the end of the season.

In August 2011 he moved to the youth team of Sport Club Corinthians Paulista.

== Contract ==
- Ceará.
