= Jorge Córdoba =

Argentine footballer

Personal information
- Full name: Jorge Cristian Córdoba
- Date of birth: December 12, 1987 (age 38)
- Place of birth: Santa Fe, Argentina
- Height: 1.89 m (6 ft 2 in)
- Position: Forward

Team information
- Current team: Deportes Valdivia
- Number: 11

Youth career
- 2000–2008: Unión de Santa Fe

Senior career*
Years	Team	Apps	(Gls)
2008–2009	Unión de Santa Fe	2	(0)
2009–2010	River Plate Montevideo	41	(11)
2010–2011	Gimnasia LP	27	(9)
2010–2011	Deportivo Quito	12	(0)
2011–2012	Arsenal Sarandí	11	(0)
2012–2013	Godoy Cruz	8	(0)
2012–2013	Defensa y Justicia	8	(0)
2013–2015	Sarmiento	39	(7)
2015–2016	Los Andes	33	(7)
2016	Juventud Unida	19	(4)
2016–2017	Douglas Haig	40	(10)
2017–2018	Villa Dálmine	25	(5)
2018–2019	Dorados de Sinaloa	29	(5)
2019	Correcaminos UAT	5	(0)
2020–	Deportes Valdivia	10	(0)
- * Club domestic league appearances and goals as of 19 October 2020

Jorge Cristian Córdoba (born December 12, 1987) is an Argentine professional footballer who currently plays for Deportes Valdivia as a forward.

== Career ==
Córdoba started his professional career in 2008, at the Nacional B (second division) club Unión de Santa Fe. In January 2009, he was loaned to River Plate, in Uruguay, until June 30, 2010, with a buying option. He scored his first professional goal on May 16, 2009, in a league game against Peñarol.

== Honours ==
Arsenal

- Argentine Primera División (1): 2012 Clausura
