= List of Argentine Primera División transfers July–August 2010 =

This is a list of football transfers in the July–August (winter) transfer window of the 2010–11 season of the Argentine Primera División.

Clubs are ordered according to their final standing in the 2010 Clausura tournament. Only expatriate clubs are identified with national flags.

== Argentinos Juniors ==
In:

Out:

| No. | Pos. | Nation | Player |
|---|---|---|---|
| — | MF | ARG | Mauro Bogado (from (Chile) Everton, loan return) |
| — | GK | ARG | Juan Carrera (from Independiente Rivadavia, loan return) |
| — | MF | ARG | Lionel Coudannes (from All Boys, loan return) |
| — | FW | PAR | Fabio Escobar (from Atlético Tucumán) |
| — | DF | ARG | Sergio Escudero (from (Brazil) Corinthians) |
| — | GK | ARG | Nicolás Navarro (from River Plate) |
| — | FW | ARG | Franco Niell (from (Ecuador) Deportivo Quito, loan return) |
| — | MF | ARG | Darío Ocampo (from Rosario Central, on loan from Vélez Sársfield) |
| — | MF | ARG | Jonathan Páez (from Defensores de Belgrano, loan return) |
| — | MF | PAR | Carlos Recalde (from (Paraguay) Cerro Porteño, loan return) |
| — | FW | ARG | Eial Strahman (from Instituto) |
| — | DF | ARG | Miguel Ángel Torrén (from (Paraguay) Cerro Porteño) |
| — | FW | URU | Gonzalo Vargas (from (Mexico) Atlas) |

| No. | Pos. | Nation | Player |
|---|---|---|---|
| — | MF | ARG | Aníbal Alarcón (to Los Andes) |
| — | MF | ARG | Facundo Alfonso (to Instituto) |
| — | DF | PAR | Pedro Balbuena (to (Paraguay) Sport Colombia) |
| — | FW | ARG | José Luis Calderón (to Cambaceres) |
| — | DF | ARG | Ignacio Canuto (to (Israel) Maccabi Haifa) |
| — | DF | ARG | Matías Caruzzo (to Boca Juniors) |
| — | FW | ARG | Facundo Coria (to (Spain) Villarreal, end of loan from Vélez Sársfield) |
| — | DF | ARG | Nicolás Dematei (to Sarmiento) |
| — | GK | ARG | Gabriel Frandino (to Sportivo Belgrano) |
| — | FW | ARG | Sebastián Jaime (to (Chile) La Serena) |
| — | FW | ARG | Nicolás Pavlovich (to (Mexico) Necaxa) |
| — | GK | CHI | Nicolás Peric (to (Paraguay) Olimpia) |
| — | GK | ARG | Diego Quiroz (to Atlanta) |
| — | MF | ARG | Santiago Raymonda (to Quilmes) |
| — | FW | ARG | Ismael Sosa (to (Turkey) Gaziantepspor, end of loan from Independiente) |

== Estudiantes de La Plata ==
In:

Out:

| No. | Pos. | Nation | Player |
|---|---|---|---|
| — | FW | ARG | Mauricio Carrasco (from Quilmes, loan return) |
| — | MF | ARG | Ramón Fernández (from (Croatia) NK Rijeka, loan return) |
| — | FW | URU | Hernán Rodrigo López (from Vélez Sársfield) |
| — | DF | ARG | Gabriel Mercado (from Racing) |
| — | MF | ARG | Gabriel Peñalba (from (France) FC Lorient, on loan) |
| — | FW | ARG | Juan Pablo Pereyra (from Atlético Tucumán) |
| — | DF | ARG | Facundo Roncaglia (from (Spain) RCD Espanyol, on loan from Boca Juniors) |

| No. | Pos. | Nation | Player |
|---|---|---|---|
| — | GK | ARG | Damián Albil (to San Lorenzo, on loan) |
| — | DF | ARG | Marcos Angeleri (to (England) Sunderland AFC) |
| — | FW | ARG | Mauro Boselli (to (England) Wigan Athletic) |
| — | MF | ARG | Marcelo Carrusca (to Banfield, end of loan from (Turkey) Galatasaray) |
| — | DF | ARG | Cristian Cellay (to Boca Juniors) |
| — | GK | PAR | Roberto Junior Fernández (to Racing) |
| — | MF | ARG | Cristian Gaitán (to Unión, on loan) |
| — | FW | ARG | Jerónimo Morales Neumann (to (England) Barnsley FC) |
| — | DF | ARG | Clemente Rodríguez (to Boca Juniors) |
| — | MF | ARG | José Sosa (to (Italy) SSC Napoli, end of loan from (Germany) FC Bayern Munich) |
| — | MF | ARG | Iani Verón (to (Hungary) Ferencvárosi TC, on loan) |

== Godoy Cruz ==
In:

Out:

| No. | Pos. | Nation | Player |
|---|---|---|---|
| — | DF | ARG | Emanuel Aguilera (from Deportivo Guaymallén) |
| — | DF | ARG | Lucas Ceballos (from Desamparados) |
| — | MF | ARG | Israel Damonte (from (Greece) Asteras Tripolis) |
| — | MF | ARG | Gonzalo Díaz (from Instituto, loan return) |
| — | MF | ARG | Mariano Donda (from (Italy) AS Bari) |
| — | FW | ARG | Pablo Miranda (from Villa San Carlos) |
| — | FW | URU | Fabricio Núñez (from (Uruguay) Cerro Largo) |
| — | FW | ARG | Jorge Piñeiro da Silva (from C.A.I.) |
| — | DF | ARG | Roberto Russo (from Nueva Chicago) |
| — | DF | ARG | Nicolás Sánchez (from River Plate) |
| — | MF | ARG | Diego Villar (from Gimnasia y Esgrima La Plata) |

| No. | Pos. | Nation | Player |
|---|---|---|---|
| — | MF | ARG | Martín Aguirre (to Olimpo) |
| — | GK | ARG | Cristian Aracena (to 9 de Julio de Rafaela) |
| — | FW | ARG | Cristian Chávez (to Atlético Tucumán, end of loan from San Lorenzo) |
| — | DF | ARG | Lautaro Formica (to Huracán) |
| — | MF | ARG | Ernesto Garín (to San Martín de Mendoza) |
| — | FW | ARG | Federico Higuaín (to Newell's Old Boys) |
| — | DF | ARG | Luis Lobo (to (Venezuela) Deportivo Anzoátegui) |
| — | DF | URU | Sebastián Martínez (to Quilmes) |
| — | GK | ARG | José Ramírez (to Defensa y Justicia) |
| — | DF | ARG | Darío Salomón (to Deportivo Maipú) |
| — | MF | ARG | Leandro Torres (to (Ecuador) Emelec) |
| — | DF | ARG | Nicolás Triviño (to San Martín de Tucumán) |
| — | FW | ARG | Daniel Vega (to San Martín de Tucumán) |

== Independiente ==
In:

Out:

| No. | Pos. | Nation | Player |
|---|---|---|---|
| — | GK | ARG | Fabián Assmann (from (Spain) UD Las Palmas, loan return) |
| — | MF | ARG | Roberto Battión (from Banfield) |
| — | MF | ARG | Nicolás Cabrera (from Vélez Sársfield) |
| — | DF | ARG | Nicolás Delmonte (from (Albania) Dinamo Tirana, loan return) |
| — | FW | ARG | Germán Pacheco (from (Spain) Atlético Madrid B, on loan) |
| — | FW | ARG | Facundo Parra (from Chacarita Juniors) |
| — | MF | ARG | Cristian Pellerano (from Colón) |
| — | DF | ARG | Maximiliano Velázquez (from Lanús) |
| — | MF | ARG | Lucas Villafáñez (from C.A.I.) |

| No. | Pos. | Nation | Player |
|---|---|---|---|
| — | MF | ARG | Walter Acevedo (to River Plate, end of loan from (Ukraine) Metalist Kharkiv) |
| — | MF | ARG | Mariano Berriex (to (Chile) Ñublense, on loan) |
| — | FW | ARG | Darío Gandín (to (Mexico) Necaxa) |
| — | FW | ARG | Federico González (to Atlético Rafaela, on loan) |
| — | MF | ARG | Mariano Herrón (to Aldosivi) |
| — | FW | ARG | Leonel Núñez (to (Turkey) Bursaspor) |
| — | MF | ARG | Ignacio Piatti (to (Italy) U.S. Lecce) |
| — | MF | ARG | Lucas Pusineri (to Platense) |
| — | DF | ARG | Luciano Vella (to Newell's Old Boys) |
| — | DF | ARG | Mariano Viola (to Tiro Federal) |
| — | MF | ARG | Roberto Vissio (to Los Andes, on loan) |
| — | MF | ARG | Sergio Vittor (to (Slovakia) MŠK Žilina, on loan) |

== Banfield ==
In:

Out:

| No. | Pos. | Nation | Player |
|---|---|---|---|
| — | FW | ARG | Jerónimo Barrales (from (Spain) Recreativo Huelva, loan return) |
| — | FW | ARG | Marcelo Carrusca (from Estudiantes LP, on loan from (Turkey) Galatasaray) |
| — | MF | ARG | Gabriel Méndez (from (Ecuador) Deportivo Cuenca) |
| — | FW | ARG | Sebastián Romero (from Gimnasia de La Plata) |
| — | MF | ARG | Ariel Rosada (from Boca Juniors) |
| — | FW | ARG | Pablo Santillo (from Racing, loan return) |
| — | FW | ARG | Emilio Zelaya (from Rosario Central, on loan) |

| No. | Pos. | Nation | Player |
|---|---|---|---|
| — | MF | ARG | Roberto Battión (to Independiente) |
| — | MF | URU | Mathías Cardacio (to (Mexico) Atlante F.C.) |
| — | FW | ARG | Guido Di Vanni (to Gimnasia de Jujuy, on loan) |
| — | FW | URU | Sebastián Fernández (to (Spain) Málaga CF) |
| — | MF | ARG | Gustavo Gómez (to Deportivo Español) |
| — | FW | ARG | Maximiliano Laso (to (Cyprus) AEL Limassol, on loan) |
| — | GK | ARG | Cristian Lucchetti (to Boca Juniors, on loan) |
| — | DF | ARG | Jonathan Maidana (to River Plate, end of loan from (Ukraine) Metalist Kharkiv) |
| — | MF | ARG | Julio Marchant (to (Colombia) América de Cali) |
| — | MF | COL | James Rodríguez (to (Portugal) FC Porto) |
| — | FW | ARG | Luis Salmerón (to Independiente Rivadavia) |
| — | MF | ARG | Fabián Santana (to Chacarita Juniors, on loan) |
| — | DF | ARG | José Shaffer (to Rosario Central, end of loan from (Portugal) S.L. Benfica) |
| — | DF | ARG | Pablo Vergara (to Chacarita Juniors, on loan) |

== Newell's Old Boys ==
In:

Out:

| No. | Pos. | Nation | Player |
|---|---|---|---|
| — | FW | ARG | Iván Borghello (from (Ecuador) Deportivo Quito) |
| — | DF | VEN | Gabriel Cichero (from (Venezuela) Caracas FC) |
| — | FW | ARG | Luis Rodríguez (from Atlético Tucumán) |
| — | FW | URU | Sebastián Taborda (from (Uruguay) Defensor Sporting) |
| — | MF | ARG | Leandro Velázquez (from Vélez Sársfield) |
| — | DF | ARG | Luciano Vella (from Independiente) |

| No. | Pos. | Nation | Player |
|---|---|---|---|
| — | FW | PAR | Jorge Achucarro (to (Mexico) Atlas, end of loan) |
| — | MF | ARG | Hugo Barrientos (to All Boys) |
| — | MF | ARG | Leandro Benítez (to Chacarita Juniors) |
| — | FW | URU | Joaquín Boghossian (to (Austria) FC Red Bull Salzburg, end of loan from (Uruguay) Cerro) |
| — | DF | ARG | Juan Manuel Insaurralde (to Boca Juniors) |
| — | FW | ARG | Cristian Núñez (to Boca Unidos, end of loan) |
| — | DF | ARG | Juan Leandro Quiroga (to Colón) |
| — | DF | ARG | Nahuel Roselli (to Quilmes, end of loan from Aldosivi) |
| — | MF | ARG | Cristian Sánchez Prette (to (Ecuador) Barcelona SC) |
| — | MF | ARG | Diego Torres (to Quilmes) |
| — | MF | ARG | Hernán Zanni (to Douglas Haig) |

== Lanús ==
In:

Out:

| No. | Pos. | Nation | Player |
|---|---|---|---|
| — | DF | ARG | Paolo Goltz (from Huracán) |
| — | DF | ARG | Carlos Izquierdoz (from Atlanta, loan return) |
| — | MF | ARG | Adrián Peralta (from Huracán, loan return) |
| — | MF | URU | Mario Regueiro (from (Uruguay) Nacional) |
| — | FW | ARG | Nicolás Ramírez (from Chacarita Juniors, loan return) |
| — | FW | ARG | Silvio Romero (from Instituto) |

| No. | Pos. | Nation | Player |
|---|---|---|---|
| — | FW | ARG | Diego Bielkiewicz (to Atlanta, on loan) |
| — | FW | ARG | Roberto Dovetta (to Ferro, on loan) |
| — | DF | ARG | Emir Faccioli (to (Italy) Frosinone) |
| — | MF | ARG | Matías Fritzler (to (Spain) Hércules CF, on loan) |
| — | MF | ARG | Diego González (to Rosario Central, on loan) |
| — | FW | ARG | Cristian Menéndez (to (Ecuador) Emelec, on loan) |
| — | DF | ARG | Carlos Quintana (to Huracán, on loan) |
| — | DF | ARG | Maximiliano Velázquez (to Independiente) |
| — | DF | BRA | Jadson Viera (to (Brazil) Vasco da Gama) |

== Racing ==
In:

Out:

| No. | Pos. | Nation | Player |
|---|---|---|---|
| — | GK | PAR | Roberto Junior Fernández (from Estudiantes LP) |
| — | DF | ARG | Gonzalo García (from Huracán, loan return) |
| — | MF | COL | Giovanni Moreno (from (Colombia) Atlético Nacional) |
| — | DF | ARG | Iván Pillud (from (Spain) RCD Espanyol, on loan) |
| — | MF | ARG | Patricio Toranzo (from Huracán) |

| No. | Pos. | Nation | Player |
|---|---|---|---|
| — | MF | ARG | Marcos Brítez Ojeda (to Huracán) |
| — | FW | ARG | Pablo Caballero (to Tigre, on loan) |
| — | MF | ARG | Juan Carlos Falcón (to Defensa y Justicia, end of loan from Colón) |
| — | MF | ARG | Sebastián Grazzini (to All Boys) |
| — | MF | ARG | José Luis Martínez Gullotta (to Gimnasia de Jujuy) |
| — | MF | ARG | Gabriel Mercado (to Estudiantes LP) |
| — | DF | ARG | Martín Pucheta (to Los Andes) |
| — | MF | ARG | Sebastián Rosano (to (Uruguay) Wanderers) |
| — | MF | ARG | Juan Ignacio Sánchez Sotelo (to Patronato, on loan) |
| — | MF | ARG | Pablo Santillo (to Banfield, end of loan) |
| — | MF | ARG | Damián Steinert (to (Turkey) Bursaspor) |
| — | MF | ARG | Cristian Tavio (to Atlético Tucumán) |

== Vélez Sársfield ==
In:

Out:

| No. | Pos. | Nation | Player |
|---|---|---|---|
| — | MF | ARG | Augusto Fernández (from (France) Saint-Étienne) |
| — | FW | ARG | Andrés Guzmán (from Deportivo Merlo, loan return) |
| — | DF | ARG | Fernando Ortiz (from (Mexico) Tigres de la UANL) |
| — | DF | ARG | Guillermo Pfund (from Deportivo Merlo, loan return) |

| No. | Pos. | Nation | Player |
|---|---|---|---|
| — | MF | ARG | Luis Acuña (to Sarmiento, on loan) |
| — | MF | ARG | Alejandro Cabral (to (Poland) Legia Warszawa, on loan) |
| — | MF | ARG | Nicolás Cabrera (to Independiente) |
| — | FW | ARG | Leandro Caruso (to River Plate, end of loan from (Italy) Udinese) |
| — | MF | ARG | Leandro Coronel (to Quilmes, on loan) |
| — | MF | ARG | Pablo Despósito (to Tristán Suárez) |
| — | DF | URU | Pablo Lima (to (Greece) Iraklis) |
| — | FW | URU | Hernán Rodrigo López (to Estudiantes LP) |
| — | DF | ARG | Nicolás Otamendi (to (Portugal) F.C. Porto) |
| — | DF | ARG | Marco Torsiglieri (to (Portugal) Sporting CP) |
| — | MF | ARG | Leandro Velázquez (to Newell's Old Boys, on loan) |
| — | FW | ARG | Rolando Zárate (to Huracán) |

== Huracán ==
In:

Out:

| No. | Pos. | Nation | Player |
|---|---|---|---|
| — | MF | ARG | Marcos Brítez Ojeda (from Racing) |
| — | DF | ARG | Lautaro Formica (from Godoy Cruz) |
| — | FW | ARG | Mariano Martínez (from Arsenal de Sarandí) |
| — | MF | ARG | César Montiglio (from Atlético Tucumán) |
| — | MF | ARG | Ángel Morales (from (Uruguay) Nacional) |
| — | MF | COL | Harrison Otálvaro (from (Colombia) Cúcuta Deportivo) |
| — | FW | ARG | Fernando Pagés (from Unión) |
| — | DF | URU | Agustín Peña (from (Uruguay) Wanderers) |
| — | DF | ARG | Carlos Quintana (from Lanús, on loan) |
| — | DF | ARG | Facundo Quiroga (from River Plate) |
| — | FW | ARG | Mariano Torres (from (Brazil) Santo André) |
| — | FW | ARG | Rolando Zárate (from Vélez Sársfield) |

| No. | Pos. | Nation | Player |
|---|---|---|---|
| — | FW | ARG | Gustavo Balvorín (to Gimnasia de Jujuy) |
| — | FW | ARG | Leandro Benegas (to C.A.I.) |
| — | FW | ARG | Gino Clara (to (Chile) Colo-Colo) |
| — | MF | ARG | Leandro Díaz (to (Chile) Universidad Católica) |
| — | DF | ARG | Eduardo Domínguez (to All Boys) |
| — | MF | ARG | Gastón Esmerado (to Arsenal de Sarandí) |
| — | DF | ARG | Cristian Fernández (to Grupo Universitario) |
| — | FW | ARG | Andrés Franzoia (to Arsenal de Sarandí, end of loan from Rosario Central) |
| — | DF | ARG | Gonzalo García (to Racing CLub) |
| — | DF | ARG | Paolo Goltz (to Lanús) |
| — | DF | ARG | Pablo Jerez (to Olimpo) |
| — | DF | ARG | Gerardo Maidana (to Almagro) |
| — | MF | ARG | Rodrigo Malbernat (to Juventud Unida Universitario) |
| — | MF | ARG | Cristian Ortiz (to (Uruguay) Racing de Montevideo) |
| — | MF | ARG | Adrián Peralta (to Lanús, end of loan) |
| — | MF | ARG | Alan Sánchez (to Boca Unidos) |
| — | MF | ARG | Isaac Suárez (to Victoriano Arenas) |
| — | MF | ARG | Patricio Toranzo (to Racing Club) |
| — | GK | ARG | César Vallejos (to Douglas Haig) |

== Tigre ==
In:

Out:

| No. | Pos. | Nation | Player |
|---|---|---|---|
| — | FW | ARG | Leonel Altobelli (from (Spain) Albacete) |
| — | DF | COL | Juan Camilo Angulo (from (Colombia) América de Cali) |
| — | DF | ARG | Horacio Anzorena (from Gimnasia de Mendoza) |
| — | DF | ARG | Juan Carlos Blengio (from (Greece) Atromitos) |
| — | FW | ARG | Pablo Caballero (from Racing, on loan) |
| — | DF | URU | Pablo Cáceres (from (Uruguay) Danubio F.C.) |
| — | DF | ARG | Pablo De Miranda (from Colón) |
| — | MF | ARG | Ángel Díaz (from Colegiales) |
| — | DF | ARG | Mariano Echeverría (from Chacarita Juniors) |
| — | MF | ARG | Martín Galmarini (from River Plate) |
| — | MF | ARG | Esteban González (from Gimnasia de La Plata) |
| — | MF | ARG | Román Martínez (from (Spain) CD Tenerife, on loan from (Spain) RCD Espanyol) |
| — | MF | ARG | Diego Morales (from Chacarita Juniors) |
| — | DF | ARG | Daniel Mustafá (from (Portugal) Belenenses) |
| — | FW | ARG | Lucas Simón (from (Italy) Piacenza) |
| — | FW | ARG | Denis Stracqualursi (from Gimnasia de La Plata) |
| — | FW | ARG | Fernando Telechea (from Deportivo Santamarina) |
| — | MF | ARG | Cristian Trombetta (from (Portugal) Leixões) |
| — | DF | ARG | Renzo Vera (from Unión) |

| No. | Pos. | Nation | Player |
|---|---|---|---|
| — | GK | ARG | Lucas Abud (to Atlanta) |
| — | DF | ARG | Alberto Alarcón (to Colegiales) |
| — | DF | ARG | Rodolfo Arruabarrena (to (Chile) Universidad Católica) |
| — | MF | PAR | Néstor Ayala (to (Ecuador) Deportivo Quito) |
| — | DF | ARG | Hernán Castría (to Independiente Rivadavia) |
| — | FW | URU | Gonzalo Choy González (to Arsenal de Sarandí) |
| — | DF | ARG | Carlos Fondacaro (to Atlético Tucumán) |
| — | DF | ARG | Pablo Fontanello (to Gimnasia de La Plata) |
| — | DF | ARG | Juan Pablo Garat (to (Romania) Dinamo București) |
| — | FW | ARG | Leandro Lázzaro (to Instituto) |
| — | DF | ARG | Damián Leyes (to Quilmes) |
| — | FW | ARG | Carlos Luna (to (Ecuador) LDU Quito) |
| — | MF | ARG | Juan Maldonado (to Santamarina) |
| — | MF | ARG | Martín Morel (to (Colombia) Deportivo Cali) |
| — | DF | ARG | Maximiliano Oliva (to Independiente Rivadavia, end of loan from River Plate) |
| — | MF | ARG | Lucas Oviedo (to San Martín de Tucumán) |
| — | FW | ARG | Facundo Pumpido (to Independiente Rivadavia) |
| — | FW | URU | Brian Rodríguez (to (Peru) San Martín de Porres) |
| — | DF | ARG | José San Román (to San Lorenzo) |

== Gimnasia y Esgrima La Plata ==
In:

Out:

| No. | Pos. | Nation | Player |
|---|---|---|---|
| — | MF | ARG | Alejandro Capurro (from Colón) |
| — | FW | ARG | Jorge Córdoba (from (Uruguay) River Plate de Montevideo) |
| — | DF | ARG | Pablo Fontanello (from Tigre) |
| — | MF | ARG | Alejandro Frezzotti (from Chacarita Juniors) |
| — | FW | ARG | Claudio Graf (from (Chile) Colo-Colo) |
| — | MF | ARG | Walter Jiménez (from (Mexico) Santos Laguna) |
| — | DF | ARG | Miguel Ángel Juárez (from Gimnasia y Esgrima (CdU), loan return) |
| — | DF | ARG | Lucas Landa (from (Ecuador) Barcelona SC, loan return) |
| — | DF | ARG | Abel Masuero (from Ferro Carril Oeste, loan return) |
| — | DF | ARG | Ricardo Moreira (from Atlético Tucumán) |
| — | GK | ARG | Fernando Pellegrino (from Ferro) |
| — | DF | ARG | Cristian Piarrou (from Quilmes, loan return) |

| No. | Pos. | Nation | Player |
|---|---|---|---|
| — | GK | ARG | Pablo Bangardino (to Gimnasia de Jujuy, on loan) |
| — | DF | ARG | Joel Carli (to Aldosivi, end of loan) |
| — | FW | ARG | Juan Cuevas (to (Mexico) Toluca) |
| — | MF | ARG | Esteban González (to Tigre) |
| — | DF | ARG | Facundo Imboden (to Ferro) |
| — | DF | PAR | Rubén Maldonado (to (Paraguay) Olimpia) |
| — | FW | ARG | Néstor Martirena (to (Albania) Dinamo Tirana) |
| — | MF | ARG | Mariano Messera (to San Martín de San Juan) |
| — | FW | COL | Marco Pérez (to (Spain) Real Zaragoza) |
| — | FW | ARG | Antonio Piergüidi (to Huracán (CR)) |
| — | MF | ARG | Sebastián Romero (to Banfield) |
| — | FW | ARG | Roberto Sosa (to (Italy) Sanremese) |
| — | FW | ARG | Denis Stracqualursi (to Tigre) |
| — | MF | ARG | Diego Villar (to Godoy Cruz) |

== River Plate ==
In:

Out:

| No. | Pos. | Nation | Player |
|---|---|---|---|
| — | DF | ARG | Luciano Abecasis (from Rosario Central) |
| — | MF | ARG | Walter Acevedo (from Independiente) |
| — | DF | ARG | Carlos Arano (from (Greece) Aris) |
| — | MF | PER | Josepmir Ballón (from (Peru) San Martín de Porres) |
| — | GK | ARG | Juan Pablo Carrizo (from (Spain) Real Zaragoza, on loan from (Italy) SS Lazio) |
| — | FW | ARG | Leandro Caruso (from Vélez Sársfield, on loan from (Italy) Udinese) |
| — | DF | ARG | Jonathan Maidana (from Banfield) |
| — | DF | ARG | Emmanuel Martínez (from Quilmes, loan return) |
| — | FW | ARG | Pablo Mazza (from Juventud de Pergamino, loan return) |
| — | FW | ARG | Mariano Pavone (from (Spain) Real Betis, on loan) |
| — | DF | PAR | Adalberto Román (from (Paraguay) Libertad) |

| No. | Pos. | Nation | Player |
|---|---|---|---|
| — | MF | ARG | Oscar Ahumada (to (Mexico) CD Veracruz) |
| — | DF | ARG | Gustavo Cabral (to (Mexico) Estudiantes Tecos) |
| — | FW | ARG | Gustavo Canales (to (Chile) Unión Española, end of loan) |
| — | FW | ARG | Gustavo Fernández (to Instituto, on loan) |
| — | MF | ARG | Marcelo Gallardo (to (Uruguay) Nacional) |
| — | MF | ARG | Martín Galmarini (to Tigre) |
| — | FW | ARG | Gonzalo Gil (to (Chile) Ñublense) |
| — | FW | ARG | Gonzalo Ludueña (to (Chile) O'Higgins) |
| — | GK | ARG | Nicolás Navarro (to Argentinos Juniors, end of loan from (Italy) SSC Napoli) |
| — | DF | ARG | Facundo Quiroga (to Huracán) |
| — | FW | ARG | Andrés Ríos (to (Poland) Wisla Krakow) |
| — | MF | ARG | Andrés San Martín (to Sportivo Italiano) |
| — | DF | ARG | Nicolás Sánchez (to Godoy Cruz) |
| — | DF | ARG | Cristian Villagra (to (Ukraine) Metalist Kharkiv) |

== Colón ==
In:

Out:

| No. | Pos. | Nation | Player |
|---|---|---|---|
| — | MF | ARG | Damián Díaz (from (Chile) Universidad Católica) |
| — | FW | ARG | Federico Higuaín (from Godoy Cruz) |
| — | FW | ARG | Joaquín Larrivey (from (Italy) Cagliari) |
| — | MF | ARG | Cristian Ledesma (from (Greece) Olympiacos) |
| — | DF | ARG | Juan Leandro Quiroga (from Newell's Old Boys) |
| — | DF | BOL | Ronald Raldes (from (Israel) Maccabi Tel Aviv) |

| No. | Pos. | Nation | Player |
|---|---|---|---|
| — | MF | ARG | Lucas Acosta (to (Peru) Universitario) |
| — | FW | ARG | Jonatan Bauman (to Patronato) |
| — | MF | ARG | Facundo Bertoglio (to (Ukraine) Dynamo Kyiv) |
| — | FW | ARG | Rodrigo Canario (to Libertad de Sunchales) |
| — | MF | ARG | Alejandro Capurro (to Gimnasia de La Plata) |
| — | MF | ARG | Eduardo Coudet (to (United States) Philadelphia Union) |
| — | DF | ARG | Pablo De Miranda (to Tigre) |
| — | DF | ARG | Mauricio Mansilla (to Patronato) |
| — | DF | COL | Josimar Mosquera (to (Colombia) Atlético Nacional) |
| — | FW | ARG | Federico Nieto (to (Brazil) Atlético Paranaense) |
| — | FW | ARG | Juan Ordinas (to Deportivo Roca) |
| — | MF | ARG | Cristian Pellerano (to Independiente) |
| — | FW | ARG | Andrés Ríos (to Belgrano) |
| — | MF | ARG | Nicolás Torres (to (Mexico) Atlante F.C.) |

== San Lorenzo ==
In:

Out:

| No. | Pos. | Nation | Player |
|---|---|---|---|
| — | GK | ARG | Damián Albil (from Estudiantes LP) |
| — | DF | ARG | Pablo Alvarado (from Belgrano, loan return) |
| — | FW | URU | Sebastián Balsas (from (Uruguay) Nacional) |
| — | DF | ARG | Diego Herner (from (Paraguay) Cerro Porteño) |
| — | MF | COL | Leonardo López (from (Colombia) Boyacá Chicó) |
| — | MF | ARG | Guillermo Pereyra (from (Spain) Real Murcia) |
| — | DF | ARG | Diego Placente (from (France) Bordeaux) |
| — | FW | ARG | Gonzalo Rovira (from (Chile) La Serena, loan return) |
| — | DF | ARG | José San Román (from Tigre) |
| — | DF | ARG | Cristian Tula (from Arsenal de Sarandí, loan return) |

| No. | Pos. | Nation | Player |
|---|---|---|---|
| — | GK | ARG | Nereo Champagne (to Ferro Carril Oeste, on loan) |
| — | MF | ARG | Alejandro Gómez (to (Italy) Catania) |
| — | MF | ARG | Kily González (to Rosario Central) |
| — | MF | ARG | Cristian Leiva (to Arsenal de Sarandí) |
| — | MF | ARG | Maximiliano Mallemacci (to Tristán Suárez, on loan) |
| — | DF | URU | Pablo Pintos (to (Italy) SS Lazio) |
| — | FW | ARG | Bernardo Romeo (to Quilmes) |
| — | GK | ARG | Matías Vega (to Tiro Federal) |

== Boca Juniors ==
In:

Out:

| No. | Pos. | Nation | Player |
|---|---|---|---|
| — | MF | ARG | Exequiel Benavídez (from Tiro Federal, loan return) |
| — | DF | ARG | Matías Caruzzo (from Argentinos Juniors) |
| — | DF | ARG | Cristian Cellay (from Estudiantes LP) |
| — | MF | ARG | David Drocco (from Atlético Tucumán, loan return) |
| — | MF | ARG | Damián Escudero (from (Spain) Villarreal CF) |
| — | DF | ARG | Juan Manuel Insaurralde (from Newell's Old Boys) |
| — | GK | ARG | Cristian Lucchetti (from Banfield, on loan) |
| — | DF | ARG | Clemente Rodríguez (from Estudiantes LP) |
| — | GK | ARG | Maximiliano Scapparoni (from (Chile) Ñublense, loan return) |

| No. | Pos. | Nation | Player |
|---|---|---|---|
| — | DF | ARG | Leandro Aguirre (to (Uruguay) Nacional, on loan) |
| — | GK | ARG | Josué Ayala (to Independiente Rivadavia, on loan) |
| — | DF | ARG | Julio Barroso (to (Chile) Ñublense) |
| — | DF | COL | Breyner Bonilla (to (Peru) Sporting Cristal) |
| — | FW | ARG | Nicolás Gaitán (to (Portugal) S.L. Benfica) |
| — | DF | URU | Adrián Gunino (to (France) Toulouse FC) |
| — | MF | ARG | Federico Insúa (to (Turkey) Bursaspor) |
| — | DF | ARG | Juan Krupoviesa (to Arsenal de Sarandí) |
| — | MF | ARG | Guillermo Marino (to Universidad de Chile) |
| — | DF | PAR | Claudio Morel Rodríguez (to (Spain) Deportivo La Coruña) |
| — | DF | ARG | Ezequiel Muñoz (to (Italy) US Palermo) |
| — | DF | ARG | Gabriel Paletta (to (Italy) Parma FC) |
| — | FW | ARG | Jonathan Phillippe (to (Switzerland) SC Kriens) |
| — | MF | ARG | Sebastián Prediguer (to (Brazil) Cruzeiro, end of loan from (Portugal) F.C. Porto) |
| — | MF | ARG | Ariel Rosada (to Banfield) |

== Arsenal ==
In:

Out:

| No. | Pos. | Nation | Player |
|---|---|---|---|
| — | DF | PAR | Pablo Aguilar (from (Mexico) San Luis FC) |
| — | FW | ARG | Matías Alustiza (from (Spain) Xerez CD, on loan from Chacarita Juniors) |
| — | DF | ARG | Ignacio Bogino (from Rosario Central) |
| — | FW | URU | Gonzalo Choy González (from Tigre) |
| — | MF | ARG | Gastón Esmerado (from Huracán) |
| — | FW | ARG | Andrés Franzoia (from Huracán) |
| — | DF | ARG | Adrián González (from (Brazil) São Paulo) |
| — | DF | ARG | Juan Krupoviesa (from Boca Juniors) |
| — | MF | ARG | Cristian Leiva (from San Lorenzo) |
| — | DF | ARG | Lisandro López (from Chacarita Juniors) |
| — | MF | ARG | Jorge Ortiz (from (Sweden) AIK) |
| — | MF | ARG | Nahuel Sachetto (from Gimnasia de Jujuy) |
| — | DF | ARG | Gustavo Toranzo (from San Martín de San Juan, loan return) |
| — | FW | ARG | Mariano Trípodi (from (Brazil) Metropolitano) |

| No. | Pos. | Nation | Player |
|---|---|---|---|
| — | MF | ARG | Nicolás Aguirre (to Atlético Rafaela, on loan) |
| — | FW | ARG | Juan Bottaro (to (Chile) Everton) |
| — | MF | ARG | Matías Carabajal (to Almirante Brown) |
| — | MF | ARG | Nicolás Domingo (to (Uruguay) Peñarol, end of loan from River Plate) |
| — | DF | ARG | Darío Espínola (to Defensa y Justicia) |
| — | MF | ARG | Diego Galván (to Olimpo) |
| — | FW | ARG | Franco Jara (to (Portugal) S.L. Benfica) |
| — | FW | ARG | Jonathan López (to (Uruguay) Peñarol) |
| — | FW | ARG | Mariano Martínez (to Huracán) |
| — | DF | ARG | Aníbal Matellán (to (Mexico) San Luis FC) |
| — | MF | ARG | Leonardo Morales (to Atlético Rafaela) |
| — | DF | ARG | Franco Peppino (to Rosario Central) |
| — | MF | ARG | Facundo Pérez Castro (to (Greece) Olympiacos Volos) |
| — | DF | URU | Matías Pérez (to (Uruguay) Danubio) |
| — | MF | ARG | Federico Poggi (to San Martín de San Juan) |
| — | DF | ARG | Cristian Tula (to San Lorenzo, end of loan) |
| — | FW | PAR | Pablo Villalba Fretes (to Los Andes) |
| — | MF | ARG | Javier Yacuzzi (to (Mexico) Club Tijuana) |

== Olimpo ==
In:

Out:

| No. | Pos. | Nation | Player |
|---|---|---|---|
| — | MF | ARG | Martín Aguirre (from Godoy Cruz) |
| — | FW | PAR | Néstor Bareiro (from (Paraguay) Sportivo Luqueño) |
| — | FW | PAR | Guillermo Beltrán (from (Paraguay) Nacional) |
| — | DF | ARG | Nicolás Bianchi Arce (from (Greece) AEK Athens, on loan from San Lorenzo) |
| — | FW | ARG | Facundo Castillón (from Tiro Federal) |
| — | MF | ARG | Juan Manuel Cobo (from (Greece) Thrasyvoulos FC) |
| — | MF | ARG | Diego Galván (from Arsenal de Sarandí) |
| — | DF | ARG | Pablo Jerez (from Huracán) |
| — | MF | ARG | Sebastián Longo (from Atlético Tucumán) |
| — | FW | ARG | Emerson Panigutti (from (Venezuela) Deportivo Italia) |
| — | FW | ARG | Carlos Salom (from Barracas Central) |
| — | DF | URU | Juan Tejera (from (Uruguay) Central Español) |

| No. | Pos. | Nation | Player |
|---|---|---|---|
| — | MF | ARG | Federico Barrionuevo (to (Colombia) Cúcuta Deportivo) |
| — | MF | ARG | Martín Cabrera (to Aldosivi) |
| — | FW | ARG | Lucas Concistre (to (Cyprus) Anorthosis) |
| — | MF | ARG | Rogelio Martínez (to Villa Mitre) |
| — | DF | URU | Sergio Santín (to (Colombia) Atlético Nacional) |
| — | FW | ARG | Omar Zalazar (to (Chile) Audax Italiano) |

== Quilmes ==
In:

Out:

| No. | Pos. | Nation | Player |
|---|---|---|---|
| — | MF | CHI | Charles Aránguiz (from (Chile) Colo-Colo) |
| — | DF | ARG | Ariel Broggi (from (Turkey) Ankaragücü, on loan from Banfield) |
| — | MF | ARG | Leandro Coronel (from Vélez Sársfield, on loan) |
| — | DF | ARG | Fabricio Fontanini (from Atlético Rafaela) |
| — | GK | ARG | Hernán Galíndez (from Rosario Central) |
| — | DF | ARG | Danilo Gerlo (from (Spain) Real Unión) |
| — | DF | ARG | Leandro Gioda (from (Spain) Xerez CD) |
| — | DF | ARG | Facundo Gómez (from Alvarado) |
| — | MF | ARG | Santiago Hirsig (from (United States) Kansas City Wizards) |
| — | MF | PAR | Juan Manuel Iturbe (from (Paraguay) Cerro Porteño) |
| — | DF | ARG | Damián Leyes (from Tigre) |
| — | DF | URU | Sebastián Martínez (from Godoy Cruz) |
| — | GK | ARG | Diego Morales (from (Peru) Juan Aurich) |
| — | FW | ARG | Juan José Morales (from (Chile) Universidad Católica) |
| — | MF | URU | Óscar Javier Morales (from (Uruguay) Nacional) |
| — | MF | ARG | Gervasio Núñez (from Rosario Central) |
| — | MF | ARG | Santiago Raymonda (from Argentinos Juniors) |
| — | FW | ARG | Bernardo Romeo (from San Lorenzo) |
| — | DF | ARG | Nahuel Roselli (from Newell's Old Boys, on loan from Aldosivi) |
| — | MF | ARG | Diego Torres (from Newell's Old Boys) |
| — | MF | URU | Gustavo Varela (from (Uruguay) Nacional) |

| No. | Pos. | Nation | Player |
|---|---|---|---|
| — | DF | ARG | Nicolás Agorreca (to Ferro Carril Oeste) |
| — | MF | ARG | Sebastián Alberto Battaglia (to Aldosivi, end of loan from Boca Juniors) |
| — | DF | ARG | Emanuel Bocchino (to Huracán (CR), end of loan) |
| — | MF | ARG | Diego Cardozo (to River Plate) |
| — | FW | ARG | Mauricio Carrasco (to Estudiantes LP, end of loan) |
| — | FW | ARG | Leopoldo Gutiérrez (to Patronato) |
| — | MF | ARG | Marcelo Guzmán (to Patronato) |
| — | DF | ARG | Juan Manuel Herbella (to Ferro) |
| — | FW | ARG | Ramón Lentini (to Instituto, end of loan from Estudiantes LP) |
| — | DF | ARG | Emmanuel Martínez (to River Plate, end of loan) |
| — | MF | ARG | Sergio Meza Sánchez (to Ferro) |
| — | DF | ARG | Cristian Piarrou (to Gimnasia de La Plata) |
| — | FW | ARG | Maximiliano Planté (to Acassuso) |
| — | GK | ARG | Marcelo Pontiroli (to Deportivo Merlo) |
| — | DF | ARG | Walter Ribonetto (to Talleres de Córdoba) |
| — | DF | URU | Sergio Rodríguez (to Rosario Central) |
| — | DF | ARG | Nicolás Romat (to Central Norte) |
| — | FW | ARG | Facundo Sava (to Ferro) |

== All Boys ==
In:

Out:

| No. | Pos. | Nation | Player |
|---|---|---|---|
| — | MF | ARG | Hugo Barrientos (from Newell's Old Boys) |
| — | DF | ARG | Carlos Casteglione (from (Greece) Panionios) |
| — | DF | ARG | Eduardo Domínguez (from Huracán) |
| — | FW | ARG | Sebastián Ereros (from (Paraguay) Cerro Porteño) |
| — | FW | ARG | Cristian Fabbiani (free agent) |
| — | GK | ARG | Matías Giordano (from Talleres de Córdoba) |
| — | MF | ARG | Sebastián Grazzini (from Racing) |
| — | MF | ARG | Víctor López (from (Greece) Egaleo F.C.) |
| — | DF | ARG | Mauricio Prol (from Talleres RE) |
| — | MF | ARG | Lucas Rimoldi (from (Greece) Iraklis) |
| — | MF | URU | Juan Pablo Rodríguez (from (Mexico) San Luis FC) |
| — | FW | ARG | Matías Saad (from (Spain) Pontevedra CF) |
| — | MF | ARG | Facundo Tessoro (from Temperley, loan return) |

| No. | Pos. | Nation | Player |
|---|---|---|---|
| — | FW | ARG | Mariano Campodónico (to Belgrano) |
| — | MF | ARG | Lionel Coudannes (to Argentinos Juniors, end of loan) |
| — | MF | ARG | Emiliano Díaz (to (Paraguay) Guaraní) |
| — | DF | ARG | Fernando Fayart (to Patronato) |
| — | MF | ARG | Marcos Giménez (to Tristán Suárez) |
| — | MF | ARG | José Luis Gómez (to Los Andes) |
| — | MF | ARG | Pablo González (to Defensores de Belgrano) |
| — | GK | ARG | Martín Perelman (to (Uruguay) Rentistas) |
| — | FW | ARG | Juan Pablo Rial (to Platense) |
| — | FW | ARG | Pablo Solchaga (to Los Andes) |
