= List of Argentine Primera División transfers January 2011 =

This is a list of football transfers in the January (summer) transfer window in the 2010–11 season of the Argentine Primera División.

Clubs are ordered according to their final standing in the 2010 Apertura tournament. Only expatriate clubs are identified with national flags.

== Estudiantes de La Plata ==
In:

Out:

No.	Pos.	Nation	Player
—	MF	ARG	Pablo Barrientos (from (Italy) Catania, on loan)
—	DF	ARG	Nelson Benítez (from San Lorenzo)
—	FW	ARG	Milton Galiana (from Instituto, loan return)
—	MF	ARG	Jonathan Germano (from (Paraguay) Sportivo Luqueño, loan return)

No.	Pos.	Nation	Player
—	MF	ARG	Ramón Fernández (to (Chile) Unión La Calera, on loan)
—	DF	ARG	Marcos Rojo (to (Russia) FC Spartak Moscow)

== Vélez Sarsfield ==
In:

Out:

No.	Pos.	Nation	Player
—	FW	MEX	Guillermo Franco (Free agent)
—	MF	ARG	David Ramírez (from Godoy Cruz)

No.	Pos.	Nation	Player
—	FW	ARG	Eduardo Berón (to Nueva Chicago, on loan)
—	GK	ARG	Ezequiel Cacace (to (Chile) Rangers)
—	FW	ARG	Matías Conti (to Deportivo Merlo, on loan)
—	FW	ARG	Jonathan Cristaldo (to (Ukraine) FC Metalist Kharkiv)
—	FW	ARG	Leonardo Piris (to Boca Unidos, on loan)
—	MF	ARG	Leandro Somoza (to Boca Juniors)

== Arsenal de Sarandí ==
In:

Out:

No.	Pos.	Nation	Player
—	MF	ARG	Marcos Aguirre (from Lanús)
—	MF	ARG	Juan Pablo Caffa (from (Spain) Real Betis)
—	FW	ARG	Franco Mendoza (from (Peru) Total Chalaco)

No.	Pos.	Nation	Player
—	MF	ARG	Cristian Leiva (to Defensa y Justicia)
—	DF	ARG	Gustavo Toranzo (to Atlético Tucumán)
—	FW	ARG	Mariano Trípodi (to (Japan) Tochigi S.C.)

== River Plate ==
In:

Out:

No.	Pos.	Nation	Player
—	FW	ARG	Fabián Bordagaray (from San Lorenzo)

No.	Pos.	Nation	Player
—	MF	ARG	Diego Cardozo (to Boca Unidos, on loan)
—	MF	ARG	Fabio Giménez (to Guillermo Brown, on loan)
—	DF	ARG	Emmanuel Martínez (to Deportivo Merlo, on loan)
—	MF	ARG	Ariel Ortega (to All Boys)
—	MF	PAR	Rodrigo Rojas (to (Paraguay) Libertad)

== Godoy Cruz ==
In:

Out:

No.	Pos.	Nation	Player
—	DF	ARG	Emir Faccioli (from (Italy) Frosinone, third-party loan)
—	MF	ARG	Juan Carlos Falcón (from Defensa y Justicia)
—	FW	URU	Álvaro Navarro (from Gimnasia (LP))
—	FW	ARG	Rubén Ramírez (from Banfield)
—	DF	ARG	Germán Voboril (from San Lorenzo)

No.	Pos.	Nation	Player
—	FW	ARG	César Carranza (to Lanús)
—	FW	COL	Jairo Castillo (to (Mexico) Querétaro F.C.)
—	MF	ARG	Gonzalo Díaz (to Racing de Córdoba, on loan)
—	DF	ARG	Francisco Dutari (to Talleres de Córdoba, on loan)
—	MF	ARG	David Ramírez (to Vélez Sársfield)
—	DF	ARG	Paolo Santander (to Huracán Las Heras, on loan)
—	FW	ARG	Jesús Vera (to (Chile) C.D. Huachipato, on loan)
—	MF	ARG	Federico Villegas (to Andes Talleres, on loan)

== Racing ==
In:

Out:

No.	Pos.	Nation	Player
—	FW	COL	Teófilo Gutiérrez (from (Turkey) Trabzonspor, third-party loan)
—	MF	ARG	Franco Zuculini (from (Italy) Genoa C.F.C., on loan from (Germany) 1899 Hoffenheim)

No.	Pos.	Nation	Player
—	DF	ARG	Roberto Ayala (retired)
—	FW	ARG	Claudio Bieler (to Newell's Old Boys, on loan)
—	MF	ARG	José Luis Fernández (to (Portugal) S.L. Benfica)
—	MF	ARG	Damián Ledesma (to (Ecuador) Deportivo Cuenca)

== Lanús ==
In:

Out:

No.	Pos.	Nation	Player
—	DF	ARG	Carlos Araujo (from (Greece) AEK Athens)
—	DF	ARG	Bruno Bilotti (from Huracán)
—	MF	ITA	Mauro Camoranesi (from (Germany) VfB Stuttgart)
—	FW	ARG	César Carranza (from Godoy Cruz)
—	MF	ARG	Diego González (from Rosario Central, loan return)
—	MF	ARG	Diego Valeri (from (Spain) UD Almería)

No.	Pos.	Nation	Player
—	MF	ARG	Marcos Aguirre (to Arsenal de Sarandí)
—	FW	ARG	Erick Aparicio (to Tiro Federal, on loan)
—	MF	ARG	Sebastián Blanco (to (Ukraine) FC Metalist Kharkiv)
—	FW	ARG	Germán Cano (to Colón, on loan)
—	DF	ARG	Hernán Grana (to Quilmes)
—	GK	ARG	Fabián Moyano (to (Chile) San Luis de Quillota, on loan)
—	MF	ARG	Adrián Peralta (retired)
—	FW	ARG	Nicolás Ramírez (to (Ecuador) Manta, on loan)
—	FW	PAR	Santiago Salcedo (to Argentinos Juniors)

== All Boys ==
In:

Out:

No.	Pos.	Nation	Player
—	FW	ARG	Gustavo Bartelt (free agent)
—	FW	ARG	Emanuel Gigliotti (from (Italy) Novara, third-party loan)
—	MF	ARG	Ariel Ortega (from River Plate)

No.	Pos.	Nation	Player
—	DF	ARG	Jonathan Ferrari (to San Lorenzo)
—	FW	ARG	Matías Pérez García (to Universidad de Chile)

== Newell's Old Boys ==
In:

Out:

No.	Pos.	Nation	Player
—	FW	ARG	Sergio Oscar Almirón (from (Peru) Colegio Nacional Iquitos)
—	FW	ARG	Claudio Bieler (from Racing, on loan)
—	MF	PAR	Néstor Camacho (from (Paraguay) Rubio Ñu)
—	FW	ARG	Juan Manuel Cobelli (from (Chile) Deportes Iquique, loan return)
—	DF	ARG	Fabricio Fuentes (from (Mexico) F.C. Atlas)

No.	Pos.	Nation	Player
—	GK	ARG	Matías Alasia (to (Chile) Coquimbo Unido)
—	DF	ARG	Agustín Alayes (to (Chile) Colo-Colo)
—	DF	ARG	Marcelo Blanc (to Douglas Haig, on loan)
—	FW	ARG	Iván Borghello (to (Ecuador) Barcelona SC)
—	MF	ARG	Mauro Formica (to (England) Blackburn Rovers)
—	FW	ARG	Luis Rodríguez (to Atlético Tucumán)

== Colón ==
In:

Out:

No.	Pos.	Nation	Player
—	FW	ARG	Germán Cano (from Lanús, on loan)
—	DF	COL	Humberto Mendoza (from (Colombia) Atlético Nacional)
—	MF	ARG	Sebastián Prediguer (from (Brazil) Cruzeiro, on loan from (Portugal) F.C. Porto)
—	FW	PAR	Edgar Zaracho (from (Paraguay) Sport Colombia)

No.	Pos.	Nation	Player
—	FW	ARG	Juan Manuel Lucero (to (Paraguay) Cerro Porteño)
—	MF	ARG	Germán Rivarola (to Rosario Central)

== Tigre ==
In:

Out:

No.	Pos.	Nation	Player
—	FW	ARG	Martín Gómez (from Independiente, on loan)
—	DF	ESP	Mariano Pernía (from (Uruguay) Nacional)
—	DF	URU	Andrés Rodales (from (Uruguay) Liverpool)

No.	Pos.	Nation	Player
—	DF	COL	Juan Camilo Angulo (to (China) Shanghai Shenhua)
—	FW	ARG	Pablo Caballero (to (Paraguay) Guaraní)
—	DF	ARG	Pablo De Miranda (to Independiente Rivadavia)
—	DF	ARG	Claudio Pérez (to Belgrano)
—	MF	URU	Ribair Rodríguez (to Belgrano)

== Boca Juniors ==
In:

Out:

No.	Pos.	Nation	Player
—	DF	ARG	Leandro Aguirre (from (Uruguay) Nacional, loan return)
—	MF	ARG	Walter Erviti (from Banfield)
—	FW	ARG	Ricardo Noir (from (Ecuador) Barcelona S.C., loan return)
—	MF	ARG	Diego Rivero (from San Lorenzo)
—	MF	ARG	Leandro Somoza (from Vélez Sársfield)

No.	Pos.	Nation	Player
—	MF	ARG	Marcelo Cañete (to (Chile) Universidad Católica, on loan)
—	MF	ARG	David Drocco (to San Martín de San Juan, on loan)
—	MF	ARG	Damián Escudero (to (Brazil) Grêmio, on loan)
—	MF	ARG	Matías Giménez (to San Lorenzo)
—	MF	CHI	Gary Medel (to (Spain) Sevilla CF)
—	MF	ARG	Jesús Méndez (to Rosario Central, on loan)

== Argentinos Juniors ==
In:

Out:

No.	Pos.	Nation	Player
—	MF	ARG	Pablo Hernández (from (United States) D.C. United)
—	FW	PAR	Santiago Salcedo (from Lanús)
—	MF	ARG	Cristian Sánchez Prette (from (Ecuador) Barcelona S.C.)

No.	Pos.	Nation	Player
—	DF	ARG	Federico Domínguez (to Olimpo)
—	FW	PAR	Fabio Escobar (to (Paraguay) Guaraní)
—	MF	PAR	Néstor Ortigoza (to San Lorenzo)
—	MF	ARG	Jonathan Páez (to Deportivo Santamarina)
—	MF	PAR	Carlos Recalde (to (Paraguay) Sportivo Trinidense)
—	FW	ARG	Eial Strahman (to (Ecuador) Emelec)

== San Lorenzo ==
In:

Out:

No.	Pos.	Nation	Player
—	MF	PER	Giancarlo Carmona (from (Peru) Universitario)
—	DF	ARG	Jonathan Ferrari (from All Boys)
—	MF	ARG	Matías Giménez (from Boca Juniors)
—	MF	PAR	Néstor Ortigoza (from Argentinos Juniors)
—	FW	URU	Juan Manuel Salgueiro (from (Ecuador) LDU Quito, on loan from Estudiantes (LP))
—	FW	PAR	Pablo Velázquez (from (Paraguay) Libertad)

No.	Pos.	Nation	Player
—	FW	URU	Emiliano Alfaro (to (Uruguay) Liverpool)
—	FW	URU	Sebastián Balsas (to (Uruguay) Racing)
—	MF	ARG	Gonzalo Bazán (to Independiente Rivadavia, on loan)
—	DF	ARG	Nelson Benítez (to Estudiantes de La Plata)
—	FW	ARG	Fabián Bordagaray (to River Plate)
—	FW	ARG	Bruno Camiletti (to Unión Deportiva Catriel)
—	MF	ARG	Leandro Chaparro (to (Brazil) Vasco da Gama)
—	DF	ARG	Nahuel Iribarren (to Almagro, on loan)
—	MF	ARG	Axel Juárez (to Independiente Rivadavia, on loan)
—	MF	ARG	Damián Martínez (to Independiente Rivadavia, on loan)
—	MF	ARG	Santiago Prim (to (United States) Columbus Crew)
—	MF	ARG	Diego Rivero (to Boca Juniors)
—	FW	ARG	Gonzalo Rovira (to (Ecuador) Deportivo Quito, on loan)
—	DF	ARG	Germán Voboril (to Godoy Cruz)

== Banfield ==
In:

Out:

No.	Pos.	Nation	Player
—	FW	PAR	Jorge Achucarro (from (Mexico) F.C. Atlas)
—	MF	URU	Diego de Souza (from (Uruguay) Defensor Sporting)
—	MF	ARG	Jonathan Gómez (from Rosario Central)

No.	Pos.	Nation	Player
—	FW	ARG	Jerónimo Barrales (to (Chile) Santiago Wanderers)
—	MF	ARG	Walter Erviti (to Boca Juniors)
—	GK	ARG	Sebastián López (to (Chile) Deportes Antofagasta, on loan)
—	FW	ARG	Rubén Ramírez (to Godoy Cruz)

== Quilmes ==
In:

Out:

No.	Pos.	Nation	Player
—	FW	URU	Martín Cauteruccio (from (Uruguay) Nacional)
—	DF	ARG	Hernán Grana (from Lanús)
—	FW	ARG	Pablo Vázquez (from Atlético Tucumán)

No.	Pos.	Nation	Player
—	MF	CHI	Charles Aránguiz (to Universidad de Chile)
—	FW	URU	Paolo Cardozo (to (United States) Los Angeles Galaxy)
—	DF	ARG	Leandro Gioda (to (Spain) Xerez CD, end of loan)
—	FW	ARG	Damián Gómez (to Acassuso)
—	MF	ARG	Juan Iturbe (to (Paraguay) Cerro Porteño)
—	MF	ARG	Miguel López (to (United States) Los Angeles Galaxy, on loan)
—	MF	URU	Óscar Javier Morales (to (Uruguay) Cerro)
—	DF	ARG	Nahuel Roselli (to Aldosivi, end of loan)

== Olimpo ==
In:

Out:

No.	Pos.	Nation	Player
—	DF	ARG	Federico Domínguez (from Argentinos Juniors)
—	FW	ARG	Ezequiel Maggiolo (from (Colombia) Atlético Nacional)

No.	Pos.	Nation	Player
—	MF	ARG	Damián Biccicontti (to (Norway) FC Rosengård)
—	DF	ARG	Diego Flamenco (to Alvarado)
—	DF	ARG	Lucas Vasallo (to All Boys (SR))

== Huracán ==
In:

Out:

No.	Pos.	Nation	Player
—	FW	ARG	Javier Cámpora (from (Chile) Colo-Colo)
—	FW	ARG	Claudio Guerra (from (Ecuador) Universidad Católica)
—	MF	ARG	Cristian Maidana (from (Russia) Spartak Moscow, on loan)
—	DF	ARG	Matías Quiroga (from (Chile) Colo-Colo)

No.	Pos.	Nation	Player
—	DF	ARG	Bruno Bilotti (to Lanús)
—	DF	ARG	Lautaro Formica (to (Paraguay) Cerro Porteño)
—	FW	ARG	Mariano Martínez (to Aldosivi)
—	FW	ARG	Muriel Orlando (to (Peru) Colegio Nacional Iquitos)
—	MF	COL	Harrison Otálvaro (to (Peru) León de Huánuco)
—	MF	URU	Diego Rodríguez (to (Uruguay) Defensor Sporting)
—	MF	PAR	Robert Sales (to (Paraguay) Independiente F.B.C.)

== Gimnasia (LP) ==
In:

Out:

No.	Pos.	Nation	Player
—	FW	ARG	Guillermo Barros Schelotto (from (United States) Columbus Crew)
—	MF	VEN	César González (from (Mexico) San Luis Potosí)
—	FW	ARG	Germán Pacheco (from Independiente, on loan from (Spain) Atlético Madrid)
—	DF	CHI	Boris Rieloff (from (Chile) Audax Italiano)

No.	Pos.	Nation	Player
—	MF	ARG	Alejandro Frezzotti (to (Peru) Sporting Cristal)
—	MF	ARG	Walter Jiménez (to (Mexico) Puebla F.C.)
—	DF	ARG	Lucas Landa (to San Martín de San Juan, on loan)
—	FW	URU	Álvaro Navarro (to Godoy Cruz)

== Independiente ==
In:

Out:

No.	Pos.	Nation	Player
—	FW	COL	Jairo Castillo (from (Mexico) Querétaro F.C.)
—	MF	ARG	Matías Defederico (from (Brazil) Corinthians, on loan)
—	FW	ARG	Leonel Núñez (from (Turkey) Bursaspor)
—	DF	COL	Iván Vélez (from (Colombia) Once Caldas)
—	MF	ARG	Roberto Vissio (from Los Andes, loan return)
—	MF	ARG	Sergio Vittor (from (Slovakia) MŠK Žilina, loan return)

No.	Pos.	Nation	Player
—	FW	ARG	Martín Gómez (to Tigre, on loan)
—	FW	ARG	Germán Pacheco (to Gimnasia (LP), end of loan from (Spain) Atlético Madrid)
