= 2002–03 Primera B Nacional =

17th season of the second-tier football league in Argentina

Primera B Nacional
- Season: 2002–03
- Champions: Atlético de Rafaela (1st divisional title)
- Promoted: Atlético de Rafaela; Quilmes
- Relegated: Almirante Brown (A); Deportivo Español
- Top goalscorer: AP: Diego Torres; Daniel Giménez 13 goals CL: Matías Gigli; Héctor Silva 12 goals

The 2002–03 Argentine Primera B Nacional was the 17th season of second division professional of football in Argentina. A total of 20 teams competed; the champion and runner-up were promoted to Argentine Primera División.

== Club information ==
| Club | City | Stadium |
|---|---|---|
| Almagro | José Ingenieros | Tres de Febrero |
| Almirante Brown | Arrecifes | Estadio Municipal |
| Argentinos Juniors | Buenos Aires | Diego Armando Maradona |
| Atlético de Rafaela | Rafaela | Nuevo Monumental |
| Belgrano | Córdoba | El Gigante de Alberdi |
| CAI | Comodoro Rivadavia | Municipal de Comodoro Rivadavia |
| Defensa y Justicia | Florencio Varela | Norberto "Tito" Tomaghello |
| Defensores de Belgrano | Núñez | Juan Pasquale |
| Deportivo Español | Parque Avellaneda | Nueva España |
| El Porvenir | Gerli | Gildo Francisco Ghersinich |
| Gimnasia y Esgrima | Concepción del Uruguay | Manuel y Ramón Núñez |
| Gimnasia y Esgrima | San Salvador de Jujuy | 23 de Agosto |
| Godoy Cruz | Mendoza | Malvinas Argentinas |
| Huracán | Tres Arroyos | Roberto Lorenzo Bottino |
| Instituto | Córdoba | Presidente Perón |
| Juventud Antoniana | Salta | Fray Honorato Pistoia |
| Los Andes | Lomas de Zamora | Eduardo Gallardón |
| Quilmes | Quilmes | Centenario |
| San Martín | Mendoza | San Martín |
| San Martín | San Juan | Ing. Hilario Sánchez |

== Torneo Apertura Standings ==
| Pos | Team | Pld | W | D | L | GF | GA | GD | Pts | Qualification |
|---|---|---|---|---|---|---|---|---|---|---|
| 1 | Atlético de Rafaela | 19 | 11 | 5 | 3 | 28 | 16 | +12 | 38 | Promotion Playoff |
| 2 | Argentinos Juniors | 19 | 10 | 6 | 3 | 29 | 15 | +14 | 36 | |
| 3 | Quilmes | 19 | 9 | 6 | 4 | 34 | 17 | +17 | 33 | |
| 4 | Instituto | 19 | 9 | 5 | 5 | 29 | 17 | +12 | 32 | |
| 5 | Defensa y Justicia | 19 | 9 | 4 | 6 | 28 | 21 | +7 | 31 | |
| 6 | San Martín (M) | 19 | 8 | 5 | 6 | 24 | 16 | +8 | 29 | |
| 7 | Juventud Antoniana | 19 | 8 | 5 | 6 | 20 | 22 | −2 | 29 | |
| 8 | Huracán (TA) | 19 | 7 | 6 | 6 | 26 | 23 | +3 | 27 | |
| 9 | Almagro | 19 | 6 | 9 | 4 | 19 | 23 | −4 | 27 | |
| 10 | Godoy Cruz | 19 | 7 | 5 | 7 | 30 | 28 | +2 | 26 | |
| 11 | Gimnasia y Esgrima (J) | 19 | 8 | 2 | 9 | 23 | 21 | +2 | 26 | |
| 12 | Deportivo Español | 19 | 6 | 6 | 7 | 19 | 29 | −10 | 24 | |
| 13 | El Porvenir | 19 | 5 | 8 | 6 | 17 | 22 | −5 | 23 | |
| 14 | Los Andes | 19 | 5 | 7 | 7 | 25 | 28 | −3 | 22 | |
| 15 | CAI | 19 | 6 | 4 | 9 | 16 | 27 | −11 | 22 | |
| 16 | Defensores de Belgrano | 19 | 5 | 6 | 8 | 16 | 17 | −1 | 21 | |
| 17 | Belgrano | 19 | 5 | 6 | 8 | 20 | 25 | −5 | 21 | |
| 18 | Gimnasia y Esgrima (CdU) | 19 | 4 | 6 | 9 | 25 | 31 | −6 | 18 | |
| 19 | San Martín (SJ) | 19 | 4 | 6 | 9 | 17 | 25 | −8 | 18 | |
| 20 | Almirante Brown (A) | 19 | 3 | 3 | 13 | 17 | 39 | −22 | 12 | |

== Torneo Clausura Standings ==
| Pos | Team | Pld | W | D | L | GF | GA | GD | Pts | Qualification |
|---|---|---|---|---|---|---|---|---|---|---|
| 1 | Atlético de Rafaela | 19 | 11 | 6 | 2 | 35 | 26 | +9 | 39 | Promotion Playoff |
| 2 | Argentinos Juniors | 19 | 11 | 5 | 3 | 30 | 11 | +19 | 38 | |
| 3 | San Martín (M) | 19 | 9 | 6 | 4 | 27 | 20 | +7 | 33 | |
| 4 | Godoy Cruz | 19 | 9 | 5 | 5 | 31 | 19 | +12 | 32 | |
| 5 | Almagro | 19 | 9 | 5 | 5 | 31 | 22 | +9 | 32 | |
| 6 | Belgrano | 19 | 8 | 7 | 4 | 21 | 15 | +6 | 31 | |
| 7 | Quilmes | 19 | 8 | 7 | 4 | 28 | 23 | +5 | 31 | |
| 8 | Huracán (TA) | 19 | 9 | 1 | 9 | 30 | 23 | +7 | 28 | |
| 9 | Defensores de Belgrano | 19 | 8 | 4 | 7 | 28 | 26 | +2 | 28 | |
| 10 | Instituto | 19 | 6 | 10 | 3 | 20 | 20 | 0 | 28 | |
| 11 | Juventud Antoniana | 19 | 6 | 6 | 7 | 16 | 18 | −2 | 24 | |
| 12 | Defensa y Justicia | 19 | 6 | 6 | 7 | 18 | 22 | −4 | 24 | |
| 13 | Los Andes | 19 | 5 | 8 | 6 | 25 | 30 | −5 | 23 | |
| 14 | CAI | 19 | 7 | 2 | 10 | 24 | 33 | −9 | 23 | |
| 15 | Gimnasia y Esgrima (J) | 19 | 5 | 7 | 7 | 19 | 26 | −7 | 22 | |
| 16 | Almirante Brown (A) | 19 | 6 | 3 | 10 | 25 | 33 | −8 | 21 | |
| 17 | El Porvenir | 49 | 5 | 4 | 40 | 21 | 28 | −7 | 19 | |
| 18 | San Martín (SJ) | 19 | 4 | 6 | 9 | 18 | 23 | −5 | 18 | |
| 19 | Gimnasia y Esgrima (CdU) | 19 | 3 | 6 | 10 | 26 | 41 | −15 | 15 | |
| 20 | Deportivo Español | 19 | 1 | 4 | 14 | 18 | 34 | −16 | 7 | |

== Overall standings ==
| Pos | Team | Pld | W | D | L | GF | GA | GD | Pts | Promotion or qualification |
|---|---|---|---|---|---|---|---|---|---|---|
| 1 | Atlético de Rafaela | 38 | 22 | 11 | 5 | 63 | 42 | +21 | 77 | Primera División |
| 2 | Argentinos Juniors | 38 | 21 | 11 | 6 | 59 | 26 | +33 | 74 | Promotion Playoff |
| 3 | Quilmes | 38 | 17 | 13 | 8 | 62 | 40 | +22 | 64 | Promotion Playoff |
| 4 | San Martín (M) | 38 | 17 | 11 | 10 | 51 | 36 | +15 | 62 | Promotion Playoff Primera División-Primera B Nacional |
| 5 | Instituto | 38 | 15 | 15 | 8 | 49 | 37 | +12 | 60 | |
| 6 | Almagro | 38 | 15 | 14 | 9 | 50 | 45 | +5 | 59 | |
| 7 | Godoy Cruz | 38 | 16 | 10 | 12 | 61 | 47 | +14 | 58 | |
| 8 | Huracán (TA) | 38 | 16 | 7 | 15 | 56 | 46 | +10 | 55 | |
| 9 | Defensa y Justicia | 38 | 15 | 10 | 13 | 46 | 43 | +3 | 55 | |
| 10 | Juventud Antoniana | 38 | 14 | 11 | 13 | 36 | 40 | −4 | 53 | |
| 11 | Belgrano | 38 | 13 | 13 | 12 | 41 | 40 | +1 | 52 | |
| 12 | Defensores de Belgrano | 38 | 13 | 10 | 15 | 44 | 43 | +1 | 49 | |
| 13 | Gimnasia y Esgrima (J) | 38 | 13 | 9 | 16 | 42 | 47 | −5 | 48 | |
| 14 | Los Andes | 38 | 10 | 15 | 13 | 50 | 58 | −8 | 45 | |
| 15 | CAI | 38 | 13 | 6 | 19 | 40 | 60 | −20 | 45 | |
| 16 | El Porvenir | 38 | 10 | 12 | 16 | 38 | 50 | −12 | 42 | |
| 17 | San Martín (SJ) | 38 | 8 | 12 | 18 | 35 | 48 | −13 | 36 | |
| 18 | Gimnasia y Esgrima (CdU) | 38 | 7 | 12 | 19 | 51 | 72 | −21 | 33 | |
| 19 | Almirante Brown (A) | 38 | 9 | 6 | 23 | 42 | 72 | −30 | 33 | |
| 20 | Deportivo Español | 38 | 7 | 10 | 21 | 37 | 63 | −26 | 31 | |

== Promotion Playoff ==
This leg was played between the Apertura and the Clausura winner, but as Atlético de Rafaela won both tournaments, was declared champion and was automatically promoted to 2003–04 Primera División, so the match was played between the best teams placed in the overall standings under Atlético de Rafaela; Argentinos Juniors and Quilmes. The winning team was promoted to 2003–04 Primera División and the losing team played the Promotion Playoff Primera División-Primera B Nacional.

=== Match details ===
Second Promotion Playoff
28 June 2003
First leg

| Quilmes | 1–0 | Argentinos Juniors |
|---|---|---|
| Alayes 58' | Report |

Estadio Centenario, Quilmes
Referee: Horacio Elizondo

4 July 2003
16:10
Second leg

| Argentinos Juniors | 0–0 | Quilmes |
|---|---|---|
| | Report |

Ferro Carril Oeste, Buenos Aires
Referee: Héctor Baldassi

Team details

Argentinos Jrs.
Quilmes

| GK | Raúl Sanzotti |
| DF | Germán Centurión | (substituted off) a' |
| DF | Walter García |
| DF | Alejandro Castro |
| DF | Norberto Testa |
| MF | Gustavo Arriola | (substituted off) b' |
| MF | Ceferino Díaz |
| MF | Juan Carlos Mariño |
| MF | Walter Coyette | (substituted off) c' |
| FW | Roberto González |
| FW | Leonardo Pisculichi |
Substitutes:
| DF | Pablo Barzola | (substituted on) a' |
| FW | Oscar A. Gómez | (substituted on) b' |
| FW | Ramiro Leone | (substituted on) c' |
Manager:
(Argentina) Ricardo Gareca

| GK | Marcelo Elizaga |
| DF | Danilo Gerlo |
| DF | Gustavo Raggio |
| DF | Leandro Desábato |
| DF | Raúl Saavedra |
| MF | Rodrigo Braña |
| MF | Héctor Aguilar |
| MF | Leandro Benítez | (substituted off) b' |
| FW | Darío Fernández |
| FW | Alejandro Abaurre | (substituted off) a' |
| FW | Darío Cigogna | (substituted off) c' |
Substitutes:
| MF | Cristian Torres | (substituted on) a' |
| DF | Agustín Alayes | (substituted on) b' |
| MF | Santiago Raymonda | (substituted on) c' |
Manager:
(Argentina) Gustavo Alfaro

Note: Quilmes won 1–0 on aggregate, promoting to Primera División.

== Promotion Playoff Primera División-Primera B Nacional ==
The Promotion playoff loser (Argentinos Juniors) and the team placed 4th in the overall standings (San Martín (M)) played against the 18th and the 17th placed of the Relegation Table of 2002–03 Primera División.

| Team 1 | Agg. | Team 2 | 1st leg | 2nd leg |
Relegation/promotion playoff 1
| San Martín (M) | 0–2 | Talleres (C) | 0–1 | 0–1 |
Relegation/promotion playoff 2
| Argentinos Juniors | 0–3 | Nueva Chicago | 0-1 | 0-2 |

- Talleres (C) remains in Primera División after winning the playoff.
- Nueva Chicago remains in Primera División after winning the playoff.

== Relegation ==
Note: Clubs with indirect affiliation with AFA are relegated to the Torneo Argentino A, while clubs directly affiliated face relegation to Primera B Metropolitana. Clubs with direct affiliation are all from Greater Buenos Aires, with the exception of Newell's, Rosario Central, Central Córdoba and Argentino de Rosario, all from Rosario, and Unión and Colón from Santa Fe.

=== Metropolitana Zone ===
| Pos | Team | 2000–01 Pts | 2001–02 Pts | 2002–03 Pts | Total Pts | Total Pld | Avg | Situation | Affiliation |
|---|---|---|---|---|---|---|---|---|---|
| 1 | Argentinos Juniors | — | — | 74 | 74 | 38 | 1.947 | | Direct |
| 2 | Quilmes | 50 | 65 | 64 | 179 | 100 | 1.79 | | Direct |
| 3 | Defensa y Justicia | 29 | 57 | 55 | 141 | 100 | 1.41 | | Direct |
| 4 | Defensores de Belgrano | — | 56 | 49 | 105 | 76 | 1.382 | | Direct |
| 5 | Almagro | — | 40 | 59 | 99 | 76 | 1.303 | | Direct |
| 6 | Los Andes | — | 49 | 45 | 94 | 76 | 1.237 | | Direct |
| 7 | El Porvenir | 19 | 59 | 42 | 120 | 100 | 1.2 | Relegation Playoff Matches | Direct |
| 8 | Deportivo Español | — | — | 31 | 31 | 38 | 0.816 | Primera B Metropolitana | Direct |

=== Interior Zone ===
| Pos | Team | 2000–01 Pts | 2001–02 Pts | 2002–03 Pts | Total Pts | Total Pld | Avg | Situation | Affiliation |
|---|---|---|---|---|---|---|---|---|---|
| 1 | Instituto | 71 | 59 | 60 | 190 | 108 | 1.759 | | Indirect |
| 2 | Atlético de Rafaela | 45 | 59 | 77 | 181 | 108 | 1.676 | | Indirect |
| 3 | Huracán (TA) | — | 63 | 55 | 118 | 76 | 1.553 | | Indirect |
| 4 | San Martín (M) | 51 | 50 | 62 | 163 | 108 | 1.509 | | Indirect |
| 5 | Gimnasia y Esgrima (J) | 50 | 58 | 48 | 156 | 108 | 1.444 | | Indirect |
| 6 | Gimnasia y Esgrima (CdU) | 55 | 64 | 33 | 152 | 108 | 1.407 | | Indirect |
| 7 | Belgrano | — | — | 52 | 52 | 38 | 1.368 | | Indirect |
| 8 | Godoy Cruz | 44 | 47 | 58 | 149 | 108 | 1.38 | | Indirect |
| 9 | Juventud Antoniana | 43 | 51 | 52 | 146 | 108 | 1.352 | | Indirect |
| 10 | San Martín (SJ) | 50 | 57 | 36 | 143 | 108 | 1.324 | | Indirect |
| 11 | CAI | — | — | 45 | 45 | 38 | 1.184 | Relegation Playoff Matches | Indirect |
| 12 | Almirante Brown (A) | 50 | 44 | 33 | 127 | 108 | 1.176 | Torneo Argentino A | Indirect |

== Relegation Playoff Matches ==
| Team 1 | Agg. | Team 2 | 1st leg | 2nd leg |
Relegation/promotion playoff 1 (Direct affiliation vs. Primera B Metropolitana)
| All Boys | 2–2 | El Porvenir | 1–1 | 1–1 |
Relegation/promotion playoff 2 (Indirect affiliation vs. Torneo Argentino A)
| Racing (C) | 3–4 | CAI | 1–1 | 2–3 |

- El Porvenir remains in Primera B Nacional after a 1-1 aggregate tie by virtue of a "sports advantage". In case of a tie in goals, the team from the Primera B Nacional gets to stay in it.
- CAI remains in the Primera B Nacional by winning the playoff.

== See also ==
- 2002–03 in Argentine football
