= La Salle College (Buenos Aires) =

La Salle Buenos Aires
- Buenos Aires; Argentina

Information
- Type: Private
- Motto: Hacemos comunidad (We build community)
- Religious affiliation: Roman Catholic (De La Salle Brothers)
- Established: 1891; 135 years ago
- Director: Mariano Walenten
- Language: Spanish, English
- Website: www.lasalleba.edu.ar

Colegio La Salle Buenos Aires is an Argentine private school founded in 1891 by French Brother Jumaélien and located in Balvanera, Buenos Aires.

It belongs to the Institute of the Brothers of the Christian Schools, a Roman Catholic religious teaching congregation created by French priest and educational reformer Jean-Baptiste de La Salle in 1680.

Originally established as a boys-only school, nowadays both male and female students attend classes. It offers early childhood, primary, secondary and tertiary education.

== Heritage ==
In 2007, the School signed an agreement with a private company to build a 5-star hotel and convention center on its historic grounds at Riobamba and Viamonte. The project was rejected by alumni, as well as by former head of government Aníbal Ibarra, among others. In February 2008, the city legislature declared the building part of the City's historic heritage, preventing its remodeling.

The chapel has an organ designed by the organ builder Aristide Cavaillé-Coll. In 2020, an album recorded in the chapel was released, by organist Luis Caparra.

== Notable students ==
- Luis César Amadori
- Raúl Apold
- Luis José Moglia Barth
- Carlos Borcosque
- Manuel Fresco
- Juan Manuel Herbella
- Germán Lauro
- Jorge Lombi
- Pablo Lombi
- Abel Posse
- Carlos Retegui
- Sebastián Salvat
- Enrique Ernesto Shaw
- Diego Cuesta Silva
- Diego Torres
- Maxi Trusso
- Omar Zarif

== Popular culture and media ==
In 1966, David Viñas published the novel En la semana trágica, whose protagonists are two graduates of Colegio La Salle Buenos Aires who belong to the Liga Patriótica Argentina

In 2005, the duo Miranda! filmed their music video "El Profe" on the school's premises.

In May 2023, the newspaper La Nación reported a wave of thefts targeting students in the area. Students from the school described being robbed as they left class. The City of Buenos Aires Ministry of Justice and Security confirmed an increase in prevention officers along school routes.
