= Víctor López =

Víctor López may refer to:

- Víctor Manuel Bautista López (born 1958), Mexican politician
- Víctor López Morón (born 1968), Spanish tennis player
- Víctor López (footballer, born 1971), Uruguayan footballer
- Víctor Varela López (born 1973), Mexican politician
- Víctor López (footballer, born 1978), Argentine footballer
- Víctor David López (born 1987), Argentine footballer
- Víctor López (footballer, born 1997), Spanish footballer
- Víctor López (footballer, born 2003), Mexican footballer
