= Paulo Miranda =

Paulo Miranda may refer to:

- Paulo Miranda (footballer, born 1974), Brazilian football manager and former defensive midfielder
- Paulo Miranda (footballer, born 1988), Brazilian football centre-back

== See also ==
- Paul Miranda (born 1976), American football cornerback
- Pablo Miranda (born 1984), Argentine football forward
- Pablo De Miranda (born 1986), Argentine football centre-back
