= Héctor Silva =

Héctor Silva or Hector Silva is the name of:

- Héctor Silva (Uruguayan footballer) (1940–2015), Uruguayan football forward
- Héctor Silva (rugby union) (1945–2021), Argentine rugby union player and coach
- Héctor Silva (Argentine footballer) (born 1976), Argentine football striker
- Héctor Hernández Silva (born 1964), Mexican Institutional Revolutionary Party politician
