= Emmanuel Martínez =

Emmanuel Martínez may refer to:

- Emmanuel Martínez (footballer, born 1989), Argentine football defender
- Emmanuel Martínez (footballer, born 1994), Argentine football winger and forward
