= 2000–01 Primera B Nacional =

15th season of the second-tier football league in Argentina

Primera B Nacional
- Season: 2000–01
- Champions: Banfield (2nd divisional title)
- Promoted: Banfield; Nueva Chicago
- Relegated: Estudiantes (BA); Cipolletti; Ferro Carril Oeste; General Paz Juniors; San Martín (T); All Boys; San Miguel
- Top goalscorer: Daniel Jiménez 23 goals

The 2000–01 Argentine Primera B Nacional was the 15th season of second division professional of football in Argentina. A total of 30 teams competed; the champion and runner-up were promoted to Argentine Primera División.

== Club information ==
=== Interior Zone ===
Club	City	Stadium
Almirante Brown	Arrecifes	Estadio Municipal
Atlético de Rafaela	Rafaela	Nuevo Monumental
Atlético Tucumán	San Miguel de Tucumán	Monumental Presidente Jose Fierro
Cipolletti	Cipolletti	La Visera de Cemento
General Paz Juniors	Córdoba	General Paz Juniors
Gimnasia y Esgrima	Concepción del Uruguay	Manuel y Ramón Núñez
Gimnasia y Esgrima	San Salvador de Jujuy	23 de Agosto
Godoy Cruz	Mendoza	Malvinas Argentinas
Independiente Rivadavia	Mendoza	Bautista Gargantini
Instituto	Córdoba	Presidente Perón
Juventud Antoniana	Salta	Fray Honorato Pistoia
Olimpo	Bahía Blanca	Roberto Natalio Carminatti
Racing	Córdoba	Miguel Sancho
San Martín	Mendoza	San Martín
San Martín	San Juan	Ing. Hilario Sánchez
San Martín	San Miguel de Tucumán	La Ciudadela
Villa Mitre	Bahía Blanca	El Fortín

=== Metropolitana Zone ===
Club	City	Stadium
All Boys	Floresta	Islas Malvinas
Arsenal	Sarandí	Julio H. Grondona
Banfield	Banfield	Florencio Solá
Central Córdoba	Rosario	Gabino Sosa
Defensa y Justicia	Florencio Varela	Norberto "Tito" Tomaghello
El Porvenir	Gerli	Gildo Francisco Ghersinich
Estudiantes	Caseros	Ciudad de Caseros
Ferro Carril Oeste	Caballito	Arq. Ricardo Etcheverry
Nueva Chicago	Mataderos	Nueva Chicago
Platense	Florida	Ciudad de Vicente López
Quilmes	Quilmes	Centenario
San Miguel	Los Polvorines	Malvinas Argentinas
Tigre	Victoria	José Dellagiovanna

== Interior Zone Standings ==
Pos	Team	Pld	W	D	L	GF	GA	GD	Pts	Qualification
1	Instituto	32	21	8	3	71	23	+48	71	Promotion Playoff
2	Gimnasia y Esgrima (CdU)	32	15	10	7	42	32	+10	55	Promotion Playoff
3	Racing (C)	32	15	7	10	43	42	+1	52	Second Promotion Playoff
4	San Martín (M)	32	14	9	9	45	35	+10	51	Second Promotion Playoff
5	San Martín (SJ)	32	14	8	10	44	33	+11	50	Second Promotion Playoff
6	Almirante Brown (A)	32	14	8	10	44	37	+7	50	Second Promotion Playoff
7	Gimnasia y Esgrima (J)	32	14	8	10	39	32	+7	50	
8	Atlético de Rafaela	32	13	6	13	48	47	+1	45	
9	Godoy Cruz	32	12	8	12	46	47	−1	44	
10	Atlético Tucumán	32	11	10	11	38	38	0	43	
11	Villa Mitre	32	13	4	15	41	51	−10	43	
12	Juventud Antoniana	32	12	7	13	32	43	−11	43	
13	Independiente Rivadavia	32	9	8	15	38	37	+1	35	
14	San Martín (T)	32	9	5	18	42	32	+10	32	
15	Olimpo	32	9	5	18	36	52	−16	32	
16	General Paz Juniors	32	7	8	17	36	56	−20	29	
17	Cipolletti	32	5	10	17	34	69	−35	25	

== Metropolitana Zone Standings ==
Pos	Team	Pld	W	D	L	GF	GA	GD	Pts	Qualification
1	Quilmes	24	15	5	4	46	18	+28	50	Promotion Playoff
2	Banfield	24	14	7	3	41	19	+22	49	Promotion Playoff
3	Arsenal	24	13	5	6	30	21	+9	44	Second Promotion Playoff
4	Nueva Chicago	24	10	7	7	40	36	+4	37	Second Promotion Playoff
5	Platense	24	9	6	9	32	25	+7	33	Second Promotion Playoff
6	Central Córdoba (R)	24	8	7	9	20	23	−3	31	Second Promotion Playoff
7	All Boys	24	8	6	10	20	31	−11	30	
8	Defensa y Justicia	24	8	5	11	29	31	−2	29	
9	San Miguel	24	6	10	8	27	37	−10	28	
10	Tigre	24	5	11	8	18	22	−4	26	
11	Estudiantes (BA)	24	5	9	10	22	35	−13	24	
12	El Porvenir	24	2	13	9	17	27	−10	19	
13	Ferro Carril Oeste	24	3	9	12	22	39	−17	18	

== Promotion Playoff ==
The Promotion Playoff was played by the teams placed 1st and 2nd of each zone. The winning team was declared champion and was automatically promoted to Primera División. The teams that lost in semifinal joined into the Quarterfinals of the Second Promotion Playoff, and the team that lost in the final joined in the semifinal of the Second Promotion Playoff.

=== Semifinals ===
Team 1	Agg.	Team 2	1st leg	2nd leg
Semifinals
Instituto	3–4	Banfield	2–2	1–2
Semifinals
Quilmes^{1}	1–1	Gimnasia y Esgrima (CdU)	1-0	0-1

1: Qualified because of sport advantage.

=== Championship final ===
Championship Final
12 May 2001
First leg

Banfield	2–1	Quilmes
Leeb 13'; Forestello	Report	Clementz

Estadio Florencio Sola, Banfield
Referee: Héctor Baldasi

20 May 2001
Second leg

Quilmes	2–4	Banfield
Giampietri 32', 43'	Report	Sánchez 27' (pen.); Leeb 40'; Del Río 75'; Forestello 87'

Estadio Centenario, Quilmes
Referee: Horacio Elizondo

Team details

Quilmes
Banfield

GK	1	(Argentina) Marcelo Elizaga
DF	4	(Argentina) Luciano Mazzina
DF	2	(Argentina) Agustín Alayes
DF	6	(Argentina) Fabio Schiavi	Yellow card
DF	3	(Argentina) Hernán Pagés
MF	8	(Argentina) Rodrigo Braña	Yellow card	Red card
MF	5	(Argentina) Ceferino Díaz		(substituted off) b'
MF	11	(Argentina) Elvis Sá
MF	10	(Argentina) Adrián Giampietri		(substituted off) a'
FW	9	(Argentina) Gabriel Bordi
FW	7	(Argentina) Alejandro Domíguez
Substitutions:
	15	Pablo Corti		(substituted on) a'
FW	16	Alex Rodríguez		(substituted on) b'
Manager:
(Argentina) Héctor Rivoira

GK	1	(Argentina) Cristian Lucchetti	Yellow card
DF	2	(Argentina) Adrián M. González
DF	6	(Argentina) Javier Sanguinetti	Yellow card
DF	4	(Argentina) Matías Raposo	Yellow card
MF	8	(Argentina) Fabián Santa Cruz
MF	3	(Argentina) Cristian Leiva
MF	5	(Argentina) Pablo Del Río
MF	7	(Argentina) Damián Giménez
MF	10	(Argentina) Garrafa Sánchez
FW	11	(Argentina) Carlos Leeb		(substituted on) a'
FW	9	(Argentina) Rubén Forestello
Substitutions:
FW	16	Fernando E. Castro		(substituted on) a'
Manager:
(Argentina) Ramón "Mané" Ponce

Note: Banfield won 6–3 on aggregate, promoting to Primera División

== Second Promotion Playoff ==
The Second Promotion Playoff or Torneo Reducido was played by the teams placed 3rd to 6th of each zone. Instituto and Gimnasia y Esgrima (CdU) joined in the Quarterfinals, and Quilmes joined in the Semifinals. The winner was promoted to Primera División.

=== Bracket ===
Round of 16
4M	Nueva Chicago	2	1	3
5I	San Martín (SJ)	2	0	2
4I	San Martín (M) ^{1}	1	0	1
5M	Platense	0	1	1
3M	Arsenal	0	0	0
6I	Almirante Brown (A)	1	0	0
3I	Racing (C)	0	2	2
6M	Central Córdoba (R)	4	1	5

Quarterfinals
2I	Gimnasia y Esgrima (CdU)	1	0	1
4M	Nueva Chicago	0	2	2
4I	San Martín (M) ^{1}	1	2	3
6I	Almirante Brown (A)	1	2	3
1I	Instituto	3	3	6
6M	Central Córdoba (R)	1	1	2

Semifinals
1M	Quilmes	0	0	0
4M	Nueva Chicago	1	0	1
1I	Instituto	0	3	3
4I	San Martín (M)	1	1	2

Finals
1I	Instituto	0	2	2
4M	Nueva Chicago	1	3	4

1: Qualified because of sport advantage.

- Note: The team in the first line plays at home the second leg.

=== Reducido Final ===
Torneo Reducido Final
(2nd. promotion playoff)
2 Jun 2001
First leg

Nueva Chicago	1–0	Instituto (C)
Manrique

Estadio Nueva Chicago, Buenos Aires

9 Jun 2001
Second leg

Instituto (C)	2–3	Nueva Chicago
Felicia 7'; Brusco 44' (pen.)	Report	Sánchez 3'; Gómez 11', 90'

Estadio Olímpico, Córdoba, Argentina
Referee: Daniel Giménez

Team details

Instituto
Nueva Chicago

GK	Javier Klimowicz
DF	Leonardo Moyano
DF	Sebastián Brusco
DF	Ariel Lencinas
DF	Guillermo Rodríguez
MF	Damián Felicia
MF	Jorge Priotti
MF	Walter Jiménez
MF	Raúl Antuña
FW	Marcelo Ríos
FW	Mauro Amato
Manager:
(Argentina) Gerardo Martino

GK
DF
DF
DF
DF
MF
MF
MF
MF
FW
FW
Substitutions:
Manager:
(Argentina) Jorge Traverso and Roberto Vega

César Velázquez	Red card
Leonardo Orsi
Juan Manuel Herbella
Facundo Argüello
Adrián Barbona
Leonel Martens
Alejandro Farías
Héctor Sánchez	(substituted off) 62'
Christian Gómez	(substituted off) 65'
Ariel Jesús	(substituted off) 42'
Oscar Gómez
Flavio Frangella	(substituted on) 42'
Julio Serrano	(substituted on) 62'
Hernán Manrique	(substituted on) 65'

Note: Nueva Chicago won 4–2 on aggregate, promoting to Primera División.

== Promotion Playoff Primera División-Primera B Nacional ==
The best two teams of each zone that were not promoted (Quilmes and Instituto) played against the 18th and the 17th placed of the Relegation Table of 2000–01 Primera División.

Team 1	Agg.	Team 2	1st leg	2nd leg
Relegation/promotion playoff 1
Instituto	1-1	Argentinos Juniors	0-0	1–1
Relegation/promotion playoff 2
Quilmes	1–1	Belgrano	1-0	0-1

- Argentinos Juniors remains in Primera División after a 1-1 aggregate tie by virtue of a "sports advantage". In case of a tie in goals, the team from the Primera División gets to stay in it.
- Belgrano remains in Primera División after a 1-1 aggregate tie by virtue of a "sports advantage". In case of a tie in goals, the team from the Primera División gets to stay in it.

== Relegation ==
7 teams were relegated: 2 teams with the worst co-efficient from Interior Zone, 2 teams with the worst co-efficient from Metropolitana Zone and 3 more teams regardless their affiliation.

Pos	Team	1998–99 Pts	1999–00 Pts	2000–01 Pts	Total Pts	Total Pld	Avg	Situation	Affiliation
1	Instituto	57	—	71	128	62	2.065		Indirect
2	Quilmes	47	63	50	160	90	1.778		Direct
3	Arsenal	57	55	44	156	90	1.733		Direct
4	Banfield	43	59	49	151	90	1.678		Direct
5	Gimnasia y Esgrima (J)	—	—	50	50	32	1.563		Indirect
6	Atlético de Rafaela	44	51	45	140	92	1.522		Indirect
7	Gimnasia y Esgrima (CdU)	37	47	55	139	92	1.511		Indirect
8	San Martín (M)	38	50	51	139	92	1.511		Indirect
9	Racing (C)	—	38	52	90	62	1.452		Indirect
10	Juventud Antoniana	46	46	43	135	92	1.467		Indirect
11	San Martín (SJ)	36	49	50	135	92	1.467		Indirect
12	Almirante Brown (A)	42	40	50	132	92	1.435		Indirect
13	Atlético Tucumán	57	29	43	129	92	1.402		Indirect
14	Defensa y Justicia	44	52	29	125	90	1.389		Direct
15	Villa Mitre	—	41	43	84	62	1.355		Indirect
16	Platense	—	45	33	78	58	1.345		Direct
17	Independiente Rivadavia	—	45	35	80	62	1.29		Indirect
18	Godoy Cruz	30	43	44	117	92	1.272		Indirect
19	Tigre	43	45	26	114	90	1.267		Direct
20	El Porvenir	45	50	19	114	90	1.267		Direct
21	Nueva Chicago	44	33	37	114	90	1.267		Direct
22	Olimpo	43	41	32	116	92	1.261		Indirect
23	Central Córdoba (R)	43	38	31	112	90	1.244		Direct
24	All Boys	51	29	30	110	90	1.222	Primera B Metropolitana	Direct
25	San Miguel	43	35	28	106	90	1.178	Primera B Metropolitana	Direct
26	San Martín (T)	46	28	32	106	92	1.152	Torneo Argentino A	Indirect
27	Cipolletti	53	23	25	101	92	1.098	Torneo Argentino A	Indirect
28	Estudiantes (BA)	—	—	24	24	24	1	Primera B Metropolitana	Direct
29	General Paz Juniors	—	—	29	29	32	0.906	Torneo Argentino A	Indirect
30	Ferro Carril Oeste	—	—	18	18	24	0.75	Primera B Metropolitana	Direct

Note: Clubs with indirect affiliation with AFA are relegated to the Torneo Argentino A, while clubs directly affiliated face relegation to Primera B Metropolitana. Clubs with direct affiliation are all from Greater Buenos Aires, with the exception of Newell's, Rosario Central, Central Córdoba and Argentino de Rosario, all from Rosario, and Unión and Colón from Santa Fe.

== See also ==
- 2000–01 in Argentine football
