= Diego Torres =

Diego Torres may refer to:

- Diego Torres (singer) (born 1971), Argentine musician and actor
  - Diego Torres (album), 1992
- Diego Torres (footballer, born 1978), Spanish footballer
- Diego Torres (footballer, born 1979), Mexican footballer
- Diego Torres (footballer, born 1982), Argentine footballer
- Diego Torres (footballer, born 1990), Argentine footballer
- Diego Torres (footballer, born 1992), Chilean footballer
- Diego Torres (footballer, born 2002), Paraguayan footballer

== See also ==
- Diego Torre (born 1979), Mexican opera singer
- Diego de la Torre (born 1984), Mexican footballer
- Diego Jiménez Torres Airport, a former public use airport south of Fajardo, Puerto Rico
