= Alejandro Capurro =

Argentine footballer

Personal information
- Full name: Alejandro Rubén Capurro
- Date of birth: October 31, 1980 (age 46)
- Place of birth: San Lorenzo, Argentina
- Height: 1.76 m (5 ft 9 1/2 in)
- Position: Defensive midfielder

Senior career*
Years	Team	Apps	(Gls)
1999–2010	Colón	241	(9)
2006–2007	→ Sakaryaspor (loan)	22	(1)
2010–2014	Gimnasia	43	(2)
2012–2013	→ Argentinos Juniors (loan)	22	(1)
2013–2014	→ Huracán (loan)	37	(0)
2014–2016	Aldosivi	40	(1)
2016	Excursionistas	4	(0)
2017–2018	Gutiérrez SC	44	(1)
2018–2019	Deportivo Maipú	16	(1)
2020	Boxing Club	1	(0)
- * Club domestic league appearances and goals as of 21:13, 22 May 2020 (UTC)

Alejandro Rubén Capurro (born 31 October 1980 in San Lorenzo in the Santa Fe) is an Argentine former footballer.

Capurro started his career at Colón de Santa Fe in the Primera Division Argentina in 1999. He played for them until 2006 when he and his Colón teammate Franco Cángele were loaned to Turkish side Sakaryaspor in 2006.

In 2010 Capurro was bought by Gimnasia y Esgrima La Plata for a 200,000 US dollars fee.
