= Leandro Coronel =

Argentine football midfielder

Personal information
- Full name: Leandro Gastón Coronel
- Date of birth: 10 February 1988 (age 38)
- Place of birth: Morón, Buenos Aires, Argentina
- Height: 1.76 m (5 ft 9 in)
- Position: Midfielder

Youth career
- 2005–2007: Vélez Sársfield

Senior career*
Years	Team	Apps	(Gls)
2007–2012	Vélez Sársfield	49	(1)
2010–2011	→ Quilmes (loan)	9	(0)
2011–2012	→ Instituto (loan)	26	(2)
2012	→ Deportes Iquique (loan)	11	(0)
2013	Atlético Famaillá	3	(0)
2013–2015	Chacarita Juniors	36	(2)
2015	Atlético Concepción	13	(0)
2016	Andino	6	(0)
2016	Chaco For Ever	0	(0)
2019-2022	Club Leandro N. Alem	0	(0)

International career
2005	Argentina U-17	3	(0)
- * Club domestic league appearances and goals

Leandro Gastón Coronel (born 10 February 1988) is an Argentine former professional footballer who played as a midfielder.

== Career ==
Coronel made his league debut in a 3–2 away win against Banfield on 15 April 2007. He scored his first goal for the club on 18 April 2009 in a 2–0 victory over Arsenal de Sarandí. During that year, he was part of the Vélez squad that won the Clausura championship.

Coronel was loaned to recently promoted Quilmes for the 2010–11 Argentine Primera División season. After one season with Quilmes, he was loaned to Instituto in the Primera B Nacional (Argentine second division). In the second half of 2012, he moved to Chile and joined Deportes Iquique.

Back in Argentina, Coronel played for clubs such as Chacarita Juniors, Atlético Concepción, among others.

In 2022 he will retire playing in Club Leandro N. Alem.

== Honours ==
Vélez Sársfield

- Argentine Primera División: 2009 Clausura
