= Marcos Britez Ojeda =

Argentine footballer

Personal information
- Date of birth: May 22, 1986 (age 40)
- Place of birth: Buenos Aires, Argentina
- Height: 1.86 m (6 ft 1 in)
- Position: Midfielder

Team information
- Current team: Los Andes

Senior career*
Years	Team	Apps	(Gls)
2004-2009	Los Andes	129	(17)
2007	→ Tristán Suárez (loan)	10	(1)
2009-2010	Racing Club	6	(0)
2010-2011	Huracán	23	(0)
2011-2013	Independiente Rivadavia	67	(9)
2013-2014	Talleres de Córdoba	25	(1)
2014	Tristán Suárez	10	(1)
2015-2017	Los Andes	57	(6)
2017-2018	→ Altos Hornos Zapla (loan)	30	(3)
2018-2019	→ Almirante Brown (loan)	18	(2)
2019	Los Andes	28	(3)
2019-2021	Tristán Suárez	38	(2)
2022	Almirante Brown	7	(0)
2023	Sportivo Italiano	22	(0)
2024	Argentino Monte Maíz	30	(3)
2025–	Los Andes	3	(0)
- * Club domestic league appearances and goals as of 17:02, 14 August 2025 (UTC)

Marcos Britez Ojeda (born May 22, 1986, in Buenos Aires, Argentina) is an Argentina former professional footballer who plays as a midfielder for Los Andes.

== Teams ==
- Los Andes 2004–2006
- Tristán Suárez 2007
- Los Andes 2007–2009
- Racing Club 2009–2010
- Huracán 2010–2011
- Independiente Rivadavia 2011–2013
- Talleres de Córdoba 2013–2014
- Tristán Suárez 2014
- Los Andes 2015–2017
- Altos Hornos Zapla 2017–2018
- Almirante Brown 2018–2019
- Los Andes 2019
- Tristán Suárez 2019–2021
- Almirante Brown 2022
- Sportivo Italiano 2023
- Argentino Monte Maíz 2024
- Los Andes 2025
