= Sebastián Martínez (footballer, born 1983) =

Uruguayan footballer

Personal information
- Full name: Sebastián Rodrigo Martínez Aguirre
- Date of birth: April 11, 1983 (age 43)
- Place of birth: Montevideo, Uruguay
- Height: 1.86 m (6 ft 1 in)
- Position: Centre-back

Team information
- Current team: Colegiales

Youth career
- Salus
- Liverpool Montevideo

Senior career*
Years	Team	Apps	(Gls)
2001–2004	Sud América		
2004–2005	Plaza Colonia	19	(0)
2005–2010	Cerro	72	(2)
2009–2010	→ Godoy Cruz (loan)	29	(1)
2010–2015	Quilmes	99	(5)
2015	Newell's Old Boys	3	(0)
2015–2016	Atlético Rafaela	15	(0)
2016–2019	Argentinos Juniors	29	(1)
2018	→ Deportivo Morón (loan)	16	(1)
2019–2020	All Boys	35	(2)
2020–	All Boys	54	(3)
- * Club domestic league appearances and goals as of 14:46, 6 June 2022 (UTC)

Sebastián Rodrigo Martínez Aguirre (born April 11, 1983) is a Uruguayan professional footballer who plays as a centre-back for Colegiales in Argentina.

== Career ==
=== Sud America ===
Martinez started his career with Sud América in 2001. He spent three years with the club.

=== Plaza Colonica ===
In 2004, Martinez moved to Plaza Colonia for an undisclosed fee. He spent about a year with the club, playing in 19 matches in the league.

=== Cerro ===
In January 2005, Martinez moved to C.A. Cerro. In four years with the club, he made 72 league appearances, scoring twice and winning the Uruguayan Segunda División in 2006.

=== Godoy Cruz ===
In January 2009, Martinez was loaned out to Godoy Cruz. The loan lasted about a year and a half, in which Martinez made 29 appearances in the league, scoring once.

=== Quilmes ===
In the summer of 2010, Martinez was sold to Quilmes on a free transfer. He spent five years at the club, making 99 appearances and sticking with them through relegation in the 2010-11 season, and helping them to promotion in the 2011-12 season.

=== Newell's ===
In February 2015, Martinez left Quilmes for Newell's. He couldn't really make an impact for them, and he only made three league appearances in the half-season he spent there.

=== Atletico Rafaela ===
In July 2015, Martinez moved to Atletico Rafaela. He made 15 appearances in the 15–16 season.

=== Argentinos Jrs. ===
In the summer of 2016, Martinez moved again, this time to Argentinos Juniors. In his debut season, Martinez made 26 appearances, scoring once, and helped his side to promotion to the Argentine Primera División.

=== Deportivo Moron ===
In the 2018 winter transfer window, Martinez was loaned out to Deportivo Moron.

== Honors ==
- C.A. Cerro 2006 (Torneo Apertura Uruguayan Segunda División)
- Argentinos Juniors 2016-17 Primera B Nacional
