= César Velázquez =

Paraguayan footballer (born 1972)

Personal information
- Full name: César Alfredo Velázquez Cuenca
- Date of birth: 16 September 1972 (age 54)
- Place of birth: Asunción, Paraguay
- Position: Goalkeeper

Senior career*
Years	Team	Apps	(Gls)
1990–1991	Sol de América		
1992–1994	Independiente	19	(0)
1994–1995	Arsenal de Sarandí	5	(0)
1995–1996	Independiente Medellín		
1997	Deportivo Cali		
1997	Unión Española	10	(0)
1998–1999	Independiente	total	(above)
1999	Junior	9	(0)
2000–2003	Nueva Chicago	76	(0)
2003	Cerro Porteño		
2003–2004	Argentinos Juniors	38	(0)
2004	CD Olimpia		
2005	Quilmes	1	(0)
2005	Juventud Unida Universitario	22	(0)
2006	Pachuca		
2006–2007	Estudiantes RC	30	(0)
2007–2008	Deportivo Roca	32	(0)
2008–2009	Douglas Haig	20	(0)
2009	Defensores de Belgrano VR	6	(0)

International career
1992	Paraguay U23		

Managerial career
- 2019–2021: Banfield (gk coach)
- 2021: Independiente (gk coach)
- 2022: Colón (gk coach)
- 2022: Independiente (gk coach)
- 2023–2024: Banfield (gk coach)
- * Club domestic league appearances and goals

César Alfredo Velázquez Cuenca (Note: In this Spanish name, the first or paternal surname is Velázquez and the second or maternal family name is Cuenca.) (born 16 September 1972 in Asunción, Paraguay), known as César Velázquez, is a Paraguayan former professional footballer who played as a goalkeeper for clubs in Paraguay, Argentina, Chile, Colombia, Honduras and Mexico.

== Career ==
Besides Paraguay, Velázquez played in Argentina, Chile, Colombia, Honduras and Mexico.

In Chile, Velázquez played for Unión Española in the 1997 Torneo Clausura.

== Titles ==
- Independiente 1994 (Torneo Clausura)
- Nueva Chicago 2001 (Promoted a Primera División)
