= Roberto Dovetta =

Argentine football striker

Personal information
- Full name: Roberto Marcos Dovetta
- Date of birth: April 24, 1988 (age 38)
- Place of birth: Santa Fe, Argentina
- Height: 1.77 m (5 ft 10 in)
- Position: Striker

Youth career
- Sport Club Cañadense
- Boca Juniors
- 2003–2005: Lanús

Senior career*
Years	Team	Apps	(Gls)
2002	Sport Club Cañadense	–	(–)
2005–2010	Lanús	5	(1)
2010	Ferro Carril Oeste	0	(0)
2010–2011	Progreso	0	(0)
2010	→ Leganés (loan)	1	(0)
2011	→ Unión MdP (loan)	8	(0)
2011–2012	Brown de Adrogué	13	(2)
2012	Racing de Olavarría	9	(0)
2013	O'Higgins	0	(0)
2013	→ Curicó Unido (loan)	10	(1)
2014	Sport Club Cañadense	–	(–)
2014	Libertad Sunchales	11	(0)
2015	PSM Fútbol	14	(4)
2016–2017	Sacachispas	–	(–)
2018	Almafuerte	–	(–)
2019	Argentino Las Parejas	–	(–)
2020	Almafuerte	–	(–)

International career
- Argentina U17
- Argentina U20
- * Club domestic league appearances and goals

Roberto Marcos Dovetta (born 24 April 1988 in Santa Fe) is an Argentine former football striker.

== Career ==
Dovetta made his debut at senior level with Sport Club Cañadense at the age of 14. After a brief stint with the Boca Juniors youth ranks, he joined the reserve team of Lanús at the age of 15 and made his professional debut in a 5–0 home win against Olimpo de Bahía Blanca on 3 July 2005 aged 17. He made sporadic appearances for the team until 2010 when he was loaned out to 2nd division side Ferro Carril Oeste. However, due to the team's economic difficulties, the transfer did not go through. Dovetta ended up signing with CD Leganés in the Segunda División B of Spain on loan from Uruguayan club Progreso.

In July 2012, Dovetta joined Racing de Olavarría.

In 2013, Dovetta moved to Chile to join O'Higgins and play for Curicó Unido.

In the first half of 2014, Dovetta returned to Sport Club Cañadense.

In 2016, Dovetta moved to Guatemala and signed with Sacachispas in the second level. Back in Argentina, he played for Club Atlético Almafuerte in 2018 and 2020 and Argentino de Las Parejas in 2019.
