= Sebastián Longo =

Argentine footballer

Personal information
- Full name: Sebastián Ángel Longo
- Date of birth: 27 May 1983 (age 43)
- Place of birth: Mendoza, Argentina
- Height: 1.78 m (5 ft 10 in)
- Position: Midfielder

Team information
- Current team: Atlético Tucumán (technical director)

Youth career
- Gimnasia y Esgrima de Mendoza

Senior career*
Years	Team	Apps	(Gls)
2004–2005	Gimnasia y Esgrima de Mendoza		
2005	Aldosivi		
2006	Sportivo Desamparados		
2006–2007	Luján de Cuyo		
2007–2010	Atlético Tucumán		
2010–2011	Olimpo	17	(0)
2011–2012	Atlético Tucumán	34	(6)
2012–2013	Independiente Rivadavia	25	(3)
2013–2015	Atlético Tucumán	35	(2)
2016	Concepción	14	(2)

Managerial career
- 2022–2023: Atlético Tucumán (sporting director)
- 2024–: Atlético Tucumán (technical director)
- * Club domestic league appearances and goals

Sebastián Ángel Longo (born 27 May 1983) is an Argentine football official and a former midfielder. He is the technical director for Atlético Tucumán.

== Career ==
Sebastián Ángel Longo began his career in Lujan de Cuyo at age 16 years where he played 25 games scoring 12 goals in one year. He the moved in 2004 to Gimnasia y Esgrima de Mendoza, where he played as a right wing playing 25 games and scoring 8 goals in the league. His performance earned him the title of - best young player.

Following a 1.5 million offer, he was transferred in 2005 to Club Atlético Aldosivi, playing in the Primera Nacional league. He played there 18 games scoring 2 goals bringing the club to terminate his contract making him a free player.

In 2006 he signed for Sportivo Desamparados of the Torneo Argentino A league. There he played 25 games scoring 15 goals, helping the team reach the semi finals, where they lost to Atlético Tucumán.

In 2006 he returned to Lujan de Cuyo, where he played 23 games, scoring 5 goals. The following season he signed at Atlético Tucumán, helping the team's promotion to Primera Nacional, by scoring 9 goals, 1 of them in the qualifying match. In his second season in the club he helped the club get promoted to AFA Liga Profesional de Fútbol, playing 32 games and scoring 3 goals. This was the club's first-ever championship in the Primera B Nacional. in his third season with the club he played 28 games, scoring 2 goals. At the end of the season he left the club.

He signed for Olimpo in 2010, where he played one season, wishing to return to Atlético Tucumán. The nest season he returned to Tucuman, helping them win the championship of the first half of the season. His performance declined in the other half of the season. All together he played 23 games, scoring 2 goals. He decided to leave the club and sign for Independiente Rivadavia in 2012.

He played for the club one season appearing in 32 games, scoring 3 goals, he then decided to return once again to Tucuman. In 2013 he signed at Atlético Tucuman playing there 23 games and scoring 3 goals. In his second season with the club he won the Primera Nacional championship and promotion to AFA Liga Profesional de Fútbol. In 2016 he joined Concepcion and in 2018 he decided to retire from professional football.
