= Germán Centurión =

Paraguayan footballer (born 1980)

Personal information
- Full name: Germán Marcos Centurión Marecos
- Date of birth: 5 May 1980 (age 46)
- Place of birth: Concepción, Paraguay
- Height: 1.89 m (6 ft 2 in)
- Position: Centre back

Senior career*
Years	Team	Apps	(Gls)
1999–2001	San Lorenzo		
2000–2001	→ Almagro (loan)		
2002	Quilmes		
2002–2003	Argentinos Juniors		
2003–2005	Guaraní		
2006	Universitario		
2006	Olimpia		
2007–2009	Deportivo Pasto		
2010–2013	Santa Fe	96	(3)
2014–2015	12 de Octubre	30	(2)
2015	The Strongest	14	(0)
2015	Cúcuta Deportivo	9	(0)
- * Club domestic league appearances and goals

Germán Martín Centurión Marecos (born 5 May 1980) is a retired Paraguayan footballer.
