= Adrián Peralta =

Argentine footballer

Personal information
- Full name: Adrián Maximiliano Peralta
- Date of birth: 8 May 1982 (age 44)
- Place of birth: Burzaco, Argentina
- Height: 1.75 m (5 ft 9 in)
- Position: Left winger

Senior career*
| Years | Team | Apps | (Gls) |
| 2000–2003 | Tristán Suárez | 73 | (11) |
| 2003–2005 | Instituto | 65 | (5) |
| 2005 | Mallorca | 7 | (0) |
| 2006–2007 | Newell's Old Boys | 35 | (2) |
| 2007–2011 | Lanús | 45 | (2) |
| 2010 | → Huracán (loan) | 15 | (2) |
| 2013–2014 | Tristán Suárez | 19 | (0) |
| 2014 | Instituto | 5 | (0) |
| 2015 | Deportivo Morón | 33 | (3) |

Managerial career
- 2023: Lanús (assistant)
- 2024: Tristán Suárez (assistant)
- * Club domestic league appearances and goals

Adrián Peralta (born 8 May 1982) is an Argentine football coach and a former player.

== Career ==
Peralta started his career at 3rd division side Tristán Suárez in 2000.

In 2003, he was signed by Instituto de Córdoba whom he helped to win the Primera B Nacional Apertura 2003 tournament. At the end of the 2003–2004 season the club were promoted to the Primera. Instituto managed to avoid relegation at the end of the 2004–2005 season, but Peralta left the team to join RCD Mallorca of La Liga in Spain. His transfer to Europe did not work out and he soon returned to Argentina to play for Newell's Old Boys.

After one year with Newell's Peralta moved on again, this time to Lanús. In 2007, he was part of the squad that won the Apertura 2007 tournament, Lanús' first ever top flight league title.

In January 2010 Peralta joined Huracán, on loan. However, he returned to Lanús for the following season

He had to retire from football at 28 years old because of heart problems.

He later recovered and played for two more years in the lower divisions.

== Honours ==
| Season | Club | Title |
|---|---|---|
| Apertura 2003 | Instituto | Argentine 2nd division |
| Apertura 2007 | Lanús | Primera División Argentina |
