= Lautaro Formica =

Argentine football player

Personal information
- Full name: Lautaro Roque Formica
- Date of birth: January 27, 1986 (age 40)
- Place of birth: Rosario, Argentina
- Height: 1.74 m (5 ft 9 in)
- Position: Left-back

Team information
- Current team: Chacarita Juniors

Youth career
- Newell's Old Boys

Senior career*
Years	Team	Apps	(Gls)
2004–2007	Newell's Old Boys	15	(0)
2007–2008	San Lorenzo	1	(0)
2008–2010	Godoy Cruz	57	(1)
2010	Huracán	5	(0)
2011	Cerro Porteño	6	(1)
2011–2014	Asteras Tripolis	47	(0)
2014–2015	Talleres	16	(1)
2015	Guaraní Antonio Franco	27	(0)
2016–2017	Villa Dálmine	40	(4)
2017–2018	Deportivo Morón	7	(0)
2018–2021	Estudiantes RC	47	(1)
2022	Chacarita Juniors	20	(1)
2023–	Defensores de Belgrano	15	(0)

International career
2005	Argentina U-20	20	(0)
- * Club domestic league appearances and goals as of 15:19, 11 July 2022 (UTC)

Lautaro Roque Formica (born 27 January 1986 in Rosario) is an Argentine football player currently playing for Defensores de Belgrano.

== Career ==
Formica played for Newell's Old Boys, San Lorenzo and Godoy Cruz during his first professional years. He joined Huracán in July, 2010. In 2011, he joined Cerro Porteño of Paraguay.

== Personal life ==
He is the older brother of Mauro Formica, who also played for Newell's Old Boys.
