= Nahuel Roselli =

Argentine footballer

Personal information
- Full name: Carlos Nahuel Roselli
- Date of birth: 14 April 1985 (age 41)
- Place of birth: Mar del Plata, Argentina
- Height: 1.77 m (5 ft 10 in)
- Positions: Right back; right wing back

Team information
- Current team: Kimberley

Youth career
- 2005: Kimberley

Senior career*
Years	Team	Apps	(Gls)
2006–2013	Aldosivi	119	(5)
2009–2010	→ Newell's Old Boys (loan)	22	(0)
2010	→ Quilmes (loan)	4	(0)
2013–2014	Atlético Tucumán	11	(0)
2014–2015	Temperley	20	(1)
2015–2016	Talleres	8	(0)
2017	Banfield de Mar del Plata		
2017–2023	Círculo Deportivo		
2023–	Kimberley	21	(2)
- * Club domestic league appearances and goals as of 15 September 2024

Carlos Nahuel Roselli (born 14 April 1985) is an Argentine football defender who plays for Kimberley.

== Career ==
Roselli began his playing career in 2005 with home town club Kimberley of the Argentine regionalised 4th division. In 2006, he joined another Mar del Plata team; Club Atlético Aldosivi of the 2nd division. He played there until 2009.

Roselli was given his chance to play in the Primera División when he was signed by Newell's Old Boys. He made his debut for the club on 3 October 2009 in a 3–0 home win against Atlético Tucumán.
