= Diego Cardozo =

Argentine footballer (born 1987)

Personal information
- Full name: Diego Daniel Cardozo
- Date of birth: 2 June 1987 (age 39)
- Place of birth: Santa Fe, Argentina
- Height: 1.76 m (5 ft 9 in)
- Position: Midfielder

Team information
- Current team: Juventud Unida

Youth career
- River Plate

Senior career*
Years	Team	Apps	(Gls)
2008–2009	Instituto	32	(4)
2009–2010	Quilmes	16	(3)
2011	Boca Unidos	14	(0)
2011	Guillermo Brown	10	(1)
2012	Real Potosí	15	(4)
2013	Unión Magdalena	8	(0)
2013–2015	Independiente Rivadavia	51	(8)
2016	Atlanta	16	(2)
2016–2017	Independiente Rivadavia	36	(14)
2017–2018	Atlante	23	(2)
2018–2020	San Martín SJ	10	(1)
2020–2021	Independiente Rivadavia	28	(10)
2022	Atlético Rafaela	7	(0)
2022	Gimnasia y Tiro	13	(0)
2023	Sacachispas	14	(1)
2024–	Juventud Unida		
- * Club domestic league appearances and goals as of 16:34, 31 May 2025 (UTC)

Diego Daniel Cardozo (born 2 June 1987) is an Argentinian footballer who plays as an offensive midfielder for Juventud Unida.
