= Germán Pacheco =

Argentine-Spanish footballer

Personal information
- Full name: Germán Ezequiel Pacheco González
- Date of birth: 19 May 1991 (age 35)
- Place of birth: Buenos Aires, Argentina
- Height: 1.77 m (5 ft 10 in)
- Position: Forward

Team information
- Current team: Chaco For Ever

Youth career
- 2001–2006: Vélez Sarsfield
- 2006–2009: Atlético Madrid

Senior career*
Years	Team	Apps	(Gls)
2009–2011	Atlético Madrid B	5	(0)
2009	→ Rayo Vallecano (loan)	9	(2)
2010	→ Independiente (loan)	11	(1)
2011	→ Gimnasia La Plata (loan)	5	(0)
2011	Karpaty Lviv	6	(0)
2012	Unión Comercio	37	(9)
2013–2015	Juan Aurich	77	(25)
2013	→ Córdoba (loan)	12	(0)
2016	Pahang	12	(5)
2016	Ratchaburi	8	(0)
2017	Alianza Lima	30	(8)
2018	Fortaleza	23	(2)
2018	Royal Pari	13	(3)
2019	César Vallejo	28	(6)
2020	Alianza Universidad	19	(1)
2021	Deportivo Morón	8	(1)
2021	Atlético Grau	10	(4)
2022	Lanzarote	11	(1)
2022–2023	Los Chankas	19	(10)
2024	Chacaritas	13	(0)
2025	Tacna Heroica	6	(2)
2026–	Chaco For Ever	2	(1)
- * Club domestic league appearances and goals as of 16:35, 25 April 2026 (UTC)

Germán Ezequiel Pacheco González (born 19 May 1991) is an Argentine professional footballer who plays for Chaco For Ever as a forward. He also holds Spanish citizenship.

== Club career ==
Born in Buenos Aires, Pacheco started playing with Club Atlético Vélez Sarsfield, but moved with his parents to Spain still in his teens, where he finished his formation with Atlético Madrid. In the 2009–10 season he had his first taste of professional football, being loaned to neighbouring Rayo Vallecano in the second division; however, the loan was short-lived, as he returned in January 2010 to the Colchoneros, spending the following months with its reserves in the third level.

On 8 June 2010, Pacheco returned to his native country as Atlético loaned him for one year to Club Atlético Independiente. He made his Primera División debut against his first youth club Vélez, on the first fixture of the 2010 Apertura; in addition, even though he did not play any game in the tournament, he was part of the 2010 Copa Sudamericana-winning team.

For the second half of the 2010–11 campaign, Pacheco was loaned to Gimnasia y Esgrima La Plata. In the following years he competed mainly in the Peruvian Primera División with Unión Comercio and Juan Aurich, also having a brief loan spell back in Spain, with division two side Córdoba CF.

In December 2016, Pacheco returned to Peru and its top tier, signing with Alianza Lima from Thai League T1's Ratchaburi Mitr Phol FC. He marked his debut the following 12 February with a goal from a free kick, in a 2–0 home win against Club Universitario de Deportes.

== Honours ==
Independiente

- Copa Sudamericana: 2010
