= Gonzalo Rovira =

Argentine footballer

Personal information
- Full name: Gonzalo Eduardo Rovira
- Date of birth: 7 April 1988 (age 38)
- Place of birth: Santo Tomé, Corrientes, Argentina
- Height: 1.79 m (5 ft 10 in)
- Position: Forward

Youth career
- San Lorenzo

Senior career*
Years	Team	Apps	(Gls)
2006–2012	San Lorenzo	16	(2)
2010	→ Deportes La Serena (loan)	13	(3)
2011	→ Deportivo Quito (loan)	7	(0)
2012–2013	Douglas Haig	16	(0)
2013–2014	Gimnasia y Tiro	5	(0)
2014	Colegiales	5	(0)
2015	Textil Mandiyú	9	(0)
2015	San José	2	(0)
2016	Atlético Uruguay	11	(0)
2018	Unión Deportiva Catriel	–	(–)
- * Club domestic league appearances and goals

Gonzalo Eduardo Rovira (born April 7, 1988, in Corrientes, Argentina) is an Argentine former footballer who played as a forward.

== Teams ==
- (Argentina) San Lorenzo 2009
- (Chile) Deportes La Serena 2010
- (Argentina) San Lorenzo 2010
- (Ecuador) Deportivo Quito 2011–2012
- (Argentina) Douglas Haig 2012–2013
- (Argentina) Gimnasia y Tiro 2013–2014
- (Argentina) Colegiales 2014
- (Argentina) Textil Mandiyú 2015
- (Bolivia) San José 2015
- (Argentina) Atlético Uruguay 2016
- (Argentina) Unión Deportiva Catriel 2018
