= Juan Carlos Falcón =

Argentine footballer

Personal information
- Full name: Juan Carlos Falcón
- Date of birth: 19 November 1979 (age 46)
- Place of birth: General Villegas, Argentina
- Height: 1.70 m (5 ft 7 in)
- Position: Midfielder

Senior career*
Years	Team	Apps	(Gls)
1998–2002	Vélez Sársfield	126	(2)
2003–2004	Querétaro	52	(6)
2004–2005	Racing Club	29	(1)
2005–2006	Atlante	45	(5)
2007–2008	Colón	54	(1)
2009–2010	→ Racing Club (loan)	27	(1)
2010–2011	Defensa y Justicia	11	(0)
2011–2012	Godoy Cruz	32	(0)
2012–2013	Douglas Haig	29	(0)
- * Club domestic league appearances and goals as of 14:24, 29 July 2011 (UTC)

Juan Carlos Falcón (born 19 November 1979) is an Argentine football midfielder.

== Career ==
Falcón started his professional career in 1998 with Vélez Sársfield, where he played until 2002, making over 100 appearances for the club in the Argentine Primera División. In 2003, Falcón joined Mexican club Querétaro where he enjoyed the most productive spell of goalscoring in his career with 6 in 54 games.

In 2004, he returned to Argentina to play for Racing Club, but in 2005 he went back to Mexico to join Atlante. Two years later, in 2007, he joined Colón, and then again Racing Club, both in the Argentine Primera.

After playing one season with Defensa y Justicia in the Primera B Nacional, Falcón returned to the top division in 2011 signing for Godoy Cruz.

== Honours ==
Vélez Sársfield

- Argentine Primera División (1): 1998 Clausura
