= Gustavo Toranzo =

Argentine footballer

Gustavo Ariel Toranzo (born 15 September 1987) is an Argentine professional footballer who plays as a defender.

== Career ==
- Arsenal de Sarandí 2010–2011
- 2 de Mayo 2012
- San Martín de San Juan 2012–2013
- Arsenal de Sarandí 2010–2011
- Atlético Tucumán 2012–2013
- Defensores de Belgrano 2010–2011
- Sportivo Carapeguá 2013–2014
- General Díaz 2014
- Everton 2015–present
