= Víctor David López =

Argentine footballer

Víctor David López (born 20 April 1987) is an Argentine footballer who plays for Independiente Chivilcoy.

== Career ==
López signed with Greek club Panathinaikos and was loaned to Greek second division side Egaleo for one season in August 2009.
