= Héctor Silva (Argentine footballer) =

Argentine footballer

Personal information
- Full name: Héctor Ariel Silva
- Date of birth: January 17, 1976 (age 50)
- Place of birth: Santa Fe, Argentina
- Height: 1.80 m (5 ft 11 in)
- Position: Striker

Senior career*
Years	Team	Apps	(Gls)
1994–1998	Unión de Santa Fe	?	(?)
1998–1999	Douglas Haig	?	(?)
1999–2001	Juventud Antoniana	?	(?)
2001–2002	Atlético Tucumán	?	(?)
2002–2003	Gimnasia (CdU)	?	(?)
2003–2004	Instituto de Córdoba	?	(?)
2004–2005	Talleres de Córdoba	?	(?)
2005–2006	Gimnasia (J)	34	(11)
2006–2007	Banfield	9	(1)
2007–2009	Gimnasia (J)	32	(4)
2011	Ben Hur de Rafaela		
2011–XXXX	Paraná		
- * Club domestic league appearances and goals

Héctor Ariel Silva (born 17 January 1976 in Santa Fe) is a retired Argentine football striker.

Silva started his playing career with Unión de Santa Fe in 1994, the club were going to promote the Argentine Primera in 1996 and Silva enjoyed two seasons at the top level of Argentine football. In 1998, he joined Club Atlético Douglas Haig and then played for a succession of teams in the Argentine 2nd division.

In 2005, Silva joined newly promoted Gimnasia de Jujuy. Making his return to the top flight, he enjoyed a productive season, helping Gimnasia maintain their place in the Primera. Silva joined Banfield for the Apertura 2006, but returned to Gimnasia after only making 9 appearances for Banfield.
