= Lucas Landa =

Argentine footballer

Personal information
- Full name: Lucas León Landa
- Date of birth: April 3, 1986 (age 40)
- Place of birth: Chañar Ladeado, Argentina
- Height: 1.78 m (5 ft 10 in)
- Position: Centre-back

Team information
- Current team: Mitre

Youth career
- Gimnasia LP

Senior career*
Years	Team	Apps	(Gls)
2006–2011	Gimnasia LP	62	(6)
2010	→ Barcelona SC (loan)	5	(1)
2011–2013	San Martín SJ	80	(6)
2013–2016	Colón	61	(2)
2017	Guillermo Brown	19	(2)
2017–2020	Sarmiento	75	(4)
2020–2021	Instituto	42	(3)
2022–	Mitre	10	(0)
- * Club domestic league appearances and goals as of 20:19, 2 May 2022 (UTC)

Lucas León Landa (born April 3, 1986), is an Argentine footballer, who plays as a centre-back for Mitre.

== Career ==
Landa started his career for Gimnasia y Esgrima de La Plata in 2006. He had a loan spell at Ecuadorian Barcelona SC for the first half of 2010, but returned to Gimnasia in July.
