= Danilo Gerlo =

Argentine footballer

Personal information
- Full name: Danilo Telmo Gerlo
- Date of birth: March 7, 1979 (age 47)
- Place of birth: Los Quirquinchos, Argentina
- Height: 1.83 m (6 ft 0 in)
- Positions: Right back; centre back

Senior career*
Years	Team	Apps	(Gls)
2000–2002	Central Córdoba	51	(7)
2002–2004	Quilmes	37	(5)
2004–2009	River Plate	74	(2)
2010	Real Unión	15	(0)
2010–2011	Quilmes	33	(3)
2011–2013	Arsenal de Sarandí	18	(0)
2013–2014	Unión	24	(0)
2015–2016	Plaza Colonia	9	(0)
- * Club domestic league appearances and goals as of 21:14, 7 January 2017 (UTC)

Danilo Telmo "Paco" Gerlo (born March 7, 1979) is an Argentine football utility defender.

== Career ==
Gerlo started his career in the Argentine 2nd Division at Central Córdoba in Rosario in 2000. In 2002, he joined Quilmes and helped the team gain promotion to the Primera by beating Argentinos Juniors in an end of season promotion playoff. The next season saw Quilmes finish 4th and 6th scoring a total of 60 points leaving them well clear of relegation and in the qualifying places for the Copa Libertadores and the Copa Sudamericana.

== Honours ==
River Plate

- Argentine Primera División: 2008 Clausura

Arsenal

- Argentine Primera División: 2012 Clausura
