= Pablo De Miranda =

Argentine footballer (born 1986)

Personal information
- Full name: Pablo Timoteo De Miranda
- Date of birth: 24 February 1986 (age 40)
- Place of birth: Comodoro Rivadavia, Argentina
- Height: 1.86 m (6 ft 1 in)
- Position: Centre back

Senior career*
Years	Team	Apps	(Gls)
2003–2009	C.A.I	129	(5)
2009–2010	Colón	7	(0)
2010–2011	Tigre	2	(0)
2011–2012	Independiente Rivadavia	32	(1)
2012–2013	Ferro Carril Oeste	37	(1)
2013–2014	Instituto	36	(1)
2014–2015	Defensa y Justicia	9	(0)
2015–2016	Oaxaca	6	(0)
2016–2017	Instituto	19	(1)
2017–2018	Blooming	54	(3)
2019	Carlos A. Mannucci	6	(0)
2019	Celaya	2	(0)
2020	San Luca	7	(1)
2020–2021	Fasano	22	(0)
2021–2022	Rende	30	(1)
2022–2023	Albanova		
2023–2024	Afragolese		
- * Club domestic league appearances and goals

Pablo Timoteo De Miranda (born 24 February 1986) is an Argentinian former football defender.

== Career ==
De Miranda started his career with C.A.I. He then went on to play for Colón de Santa Fe in the Argentine Primera División. In 2010, De Miranda signed for Tigre.
