= Emmanuel Martínez (footballer, born 1989) =

Argentine footballer

Personal information
- Date of birth: 23 March 1989 (age 37)
- Place of birth: San Martin, Argentina
- Height: 1.73 m (5 ft 8 in)
- Position: Defender

Senior career*
Years	Team	Apps	(Gls)
2007–2009	River Plate	3	(0)
2008	→ Pirin Blagoevgrad (loan)	9	(0)
2009	→ Ferro (loan)	5	(0)
2010	→ Quilmes (loan)	13	(0)
2010–2012	Deportivo Merlo	39	(0)
2012–2013	Olimpo	9	(0)
2013–2015	Los Andes	91	(0)
2016	Juventud Unida	0	(0)
2016–2017	Barracas Central	32	(0)
2017–2018	Los Andes	16	(0)
2018	Molfetta		
2019	Vigor Trani		
2019–2021	Ugento		
2021–2022	Gallipoli		
2022	Casalbordino		
2022	Toma Maglie		
2022–2023	Novoli		
2023–	Ugento	11	(0)
- * Club domestic league appearances and goals as of 17 November 2024

Emmanuel Martínez (born 23 March 1989) is an Argentine football right back who plays for Italian Serie D club Ugento.

== Career ==
=== Italy ===
Martínez moved to Italy in the summer 2018 and joined Molfetta Sportiva. In the beginning of 2019, he joined Vigor Trani Calcio, before joining Ugento Calcio in August 2019.
