= Diego Torres (footballer, born 1982) =

Argentine footballer

Personal information
- Full name: Diego Alberto Torres
- Date of birth: July 3, 1982 (age 44)
- Place of birth: Bragado, Buenos Aires, Argentina
- Height: 1.71 m (5 ft 7 in)
- Positions: Right winger; second striker

Senior career*
Years	Team	Apps	(Gls)
2003–2007	Quilmes	99	(10)
2007–2010	Newell's Old Boys	32	(2)
2010–2011	Quilmes	32	(1)
2011–2013	Arsenal de Sarandí	39	(1)
2013–2016	Crucero del Norte	57	(2)
2016	Almirante Brown	7	(0)
2016–2017	Quilmes	1	(0)
- * Club domestic league appearances and goals as of 25 May 2015

Diego Alberto Torres (born 3 July 1982 in Bragado) is an Argentine retired footballer

== Career ==
Torres started his career in Quilmes Atlético Club where he played 105 games and scored 10 goals. He was part of the team that won promotion from the 2nd division and qualified for Copa Libertadores in the following season. Subsequently, he joined Newell's Old Boys. Torres lost his place in the Newell's team due to an injury he sustained in his 4th game with the Rosario club. He returned for the 2008 Apertura and scored a game winner against Lanús.

== Honours ==
Arsenal

- Argentine Primera División (1): 2012 Clausura
