= Juan Herbella =

Argentine footballer

Personal information
- Full name: Juan Manuel Herbella
- Date of birth: May 3, 1978 (age 48)
- Place of birth: Buenos Aires, Argentina
- Position: Defender

Senior career*
Years	Team	Apps	(Gls)
1998–2000	Vélez Sarsfield		
2000–2002	Nueva Chicago		
2002–2003	Colón de Santa Fe		
2003–2004	Quilmes		
2004	Internacional		
2005	Barcelona (Ecuador)		
2005–2006	Argentinos Juniors		
2006–2007	Godoy Cruz		
2007–2008	Gimnasia y Esgrima de Jujuy		
2008	Unión Atlético Maracaibo		
2009–2010	Quilmes		
2010–2011	Ferro Carril Oeste		
- * Club domestic league appearances and goals

Juan Manuel Herbella (born May 3, 1978), is a former Argentine footballer.

Herbella was born in Buenos Aires, Argentina.

== Teams ==
- (Argentina) Vélez Sársfield 1998–2000
- (Argentina) Nueva Chicago 2000–2002
- (Argentina) Colón de Santa Fe 2002–2003
- (Argentina) Quilmes 2003–2004
- (Brazil) Internacional 2004
- (Ecuador) Barcelona 2005
- (Argentina) Argentinos Juniors 2005–2006
- (Argentina) Godoy Cruz de Mendoza 2006–2007
- (Argentina) Gimnasia y Esgrima de Jujuy 2007–2008
- (Venezuela) Unión Atlético Maracaibo 2008
- (Argentina) Quilmes 2009–2010
- (Argentina) Ferro Carril Oeste 2010-2011
