= List of Argentine Primera División transfers (2009–10 season) =

This is a list of football transfers involving teams from the Argentine Primera División for the 2009–10 season.

== July–August (winter) transfer window ==
=== Argentinos Juniors ===
In:

No.	Pos.	Nation	Player
—	MF	ARG	Germán Basualdo (from (Argentina) Chacarita Juniors)
—	FW	ARG	Facundo Coria (from (Ecuador) Emelec, on loan from (Argentina) Vélez Sársfield)
—	DF	ARG	Nicolás Dematei (from (Argentina) Atlético Tucumán, loan return)
—	DF	ARG	Federico Domínguez (from (Uruguay) Nacional)
—	DF	ARG	Julián Fernández (from (Argentina) Atlético de Rafaela)
—	FW	ARG	Diego García (from (Argentina) Quilmes)
—		ARG	Sebastián Jaime (from (Argentina) Defensores Cambaceres)
—	MF	ARG	René Lima (from (Argentina) Gimnasia de Jujuy)
—	FW	ARG	Gustavo Oberman (from (Spain) Córdoba, on loan from (Romania) Cluj)
—	GK	CHI	Nicolás Peric (from (Chile) Everton)
—	MF	ARG	Santiago Raymonda (from (Argentina) Banfield, on loan from (Mexico) Veracruz)
—	FW	ARG	Ismael Sosa (from (Argentina) Independiente)

Out:

No.	Pos.	Nation	Player
—	FW	ARG	Gonzalo Abán (to (Argentina) Ferro Carril Oeste, end of loan from River Plate)
—	DF	PAR	Derlis Cardozo (to (Argentina) Unión de Santa Fe)
—	GK	ARG	Juan Ignacio Carrera (to (Argentina) Independiente Rivadavia)
—	MF	ARG	Matías Córdoba (to (Argentina) Quilmes)
—	MF	CHI	Kevin Harbottle (to (Chile) O'Higgins)
—	FW	ARG	Mariano Martínez (to (Argentina) Arsenal)
—	FW	ARG	Jonathan Páez (to (Argentina) Defensores de Belgrano)
—	MF	ARG	Gabriel Peñalba (to (France) Lorient)
—		ARG	Guillermo Pereyra (to (Argentina) San Martín de San Juan)
—	FW	ARG	Gabriel Pérez Tarija (to (Argentina) Independiente Rivadavia)
—	MF	PAR	Carlos Recalde (to (Paraguay) Cerro Porteño)
—	MF	ARG	Daniel Andrés Romero (released)
—	MF	ARG	Rafael Viotti (to (Argentina) Aldosivi)

=== Arsenal de Sarandí ===
In:

No.	Pos.	Nation	Player
—	DF	ARG	Cristian Álvarez (from (Spain) Córdoba)
—	MF	ARG	Diego Galván (from (Argentina) Estudiantes de La Plata)
—	FW	ARG	Jonathan López (from (Argentina) Atlético de Rafaela)
—	FW	ARG	Mariano Martínez (from (Argentina) Argentinos Juniors)
—	FW	URU	Alexander Medina (from (Uruguay) Nacional)
—	MF	ARG	Leonardo Marcelo Morales (from (Argentina) Estudiantes de La Plata)
—	DF	ARG	Franco Peppino (from (Argentina) Racing)
—	DF	URU	Matías Pérez (from (Uruguay) Danubio)
—	MF	ARG	Facundo Pérez Castro (from (Argentina) San Martín de Tucumán)
—	DF	ARG	Cristian Tula (from (Argentina) San Lorenzo)

Out:

No.	Pos.	Nation	Player
—	GK	ARG	Matías Alasia (to (Argentina) Real Arroyo Seco)
—	MF	ARG	Sebastián Carrera (to (Greece) Asteras Tripolis)
—	DF	ARG	Carlos Casteglione (to (Greece) Panionion)
—	MF	GUA	José Manuel Contreras (to (Argentina) Gimnasia de Jujuy)
—	MF	ARG	Alexander Corro (to (Argentina) Deportivo Merlo)
—	GK	ARG	Mario Cuenca (released)
—	DF	ARG	Christian Díaz (released)
—	FW	ARG	Luciano Leguizamón (to (Saudi Arabia) Al-Ittihad)
—	DF	COL	Josimar Mosquera (to (Saudi Arabia) Al-Ahli)
—	MF	ARG	Cristian Pellerano (to (Argentina) Colón)
—	MF	ARG	Andrés San Martín (to (Argentina) River Plate)
—	FW	ARG	Facundo Sava (to (Argentina) Quilmes)
—	DF	ARG	Mariano Uglessich (to (Spain) Albacete)

=== Atlético Tucumán ===
In:

No.	Pos.	Nation	Player
—	DF	URU	Deivis Barone (from (Venezuela) Caracas)
—	FW	URU	Jonathan Blanes (from (Uruguay) Racing)
—	FW	ARG	Pablo Calandria (from (Argentina) Gimnasia de Jujuy)
—	DF	ARG	Héctor Desvaux (from (Argentina) Gimnasia de Jujuy)
—	MF	ARG	David Drocco (from (Argentina) Boca Juniors)
—	FW	PAR	Fabio Escobar (from (Paraguay) Nacional)
—	MF	ARG	Matías Escobar (from (Argentina) Rosario Central)
—	FW	ARG	Emanuel Gigliotti (from (Argentina) All Boys)
—	DF	ARG	Raúl Saavedra (from (Argentina) San Martín de Tucumán)
—	DF	ARG	Matías Villavicencio (from (Argentina) San Martín de Tucumán)

Out:

No.	Pos.	Nation	Player
—	MF	ARG	Alexis Castro (to (Argentina) Atlético de Rafaela)
—	DF	ARG	Nicolás Dematei (to (Argentina) Argentinos Juniors, end of loan)
—	MF	ARG	Claudio González (to (Argentina) Central Córdoba)
—	FW	ARG	Leopoldo Gutiérrez (to (Argentina) Quilmes, end of loan from (Argentina) Godoy Cruz)
—	FW	URU	Josemir Lujambio (released)
—	DF	ARG	Daniel Molina (to (Argentina) Central Norte)
—	DF	ARG	Facundo Nicolás Quiroga (to (Uruguay) Fénix, end of loan from (Argentina) Argentinos Juniors)
—	DF	ARG	Diego Reynoso (to (Argentina) Olimpo)
—	GK	ARG	José Valdiviezo (to (Argentina) Gimnasia y Tiro)
—	DF	ARG	Mauricio Verón (to (Argentina) Racing de Córdoba)

=== Banfield ===
In:

No.	Pos.	Nation	Player
—	MF	ARG	Roberto Battión (from (Greece) Aris Thessaloniki)
—	MF	ARG	Daniel Bilos (from (France) Saint-Étienne)
—	DF	ARG	Santiago Ladino (from (Argentina) Gimnasia de Jujuy, on loan)
—	MF	ARG	Julio Marchant (from (Uruguay) Defensor Sporting, on loan)
—	DF	ARG	Sebastián Méndez (from (Argentina) San Lorenzo)
—	MF	ARG	Marcelo Quinteros (from (Argentina) San Martín de Tucumán)
—	FW	ARG	Luis Salmerón (from (Argentina) Talleres)

Out:

No.	Pos.	Nation	Player
—	FW	ARG	Jerónimo Barrales (to (Spain) Recreativo de Huelva on loan)
—	MF	ARG	Nicolás Bertolo (to (Italy) Palermo)
—	DF	ARG	Ariel Broggi (to (Turkey) Ankaragücü)
—	MF	ARG	Emanuel González (to (Argentina) Alvarado)
—	DF	ARG	Cristian Nasuti (to (Greece) Aris Thessaloniki)
—	MF	ARG	Santiago Raymonda (to (Argentina) Argentinos Juniors, end of loan from (Mexico) Veracruz)

=== Boca Juniors ===
In:

No.	Pos.	Nation	Player
—	DF	COL	Breyner Bonilla (from (Colombia) Atlético Bucaramanga)
—	DF	URU	Adrián Gunino (from (Uruguay) Danubio)
—	MF	ARG	Federico Insúa (from (Mexico) Necaxa, on loan from (Mexico) América)
—	MF	ARG	Guillermo Marino (from (Mexico) UANL, loan return)
—	MF	CHI	Gary Medel (from (Chile) Universidad Católica, on loan)
—	FW	ARG	Marcos Mondaini (from (Uruguay) Nacional, loan return)
—	DF	ARG	Fabián Monzón (from (Spain) Real Betis, loan return)
—	FW	ARG	Lucas Pratto (from (Norway) Lyn, loan return)
—	MF	ARG	Ariel Rosada (from (Spain) Celta de Vigo)
—	DF	ARG	Santiago Villafañe (from (Spain) Real Madrid Castilla, loan return)

Out:

No.	Pos.	Nation	Player
—	MF	ARG	Damián Díaz (to (Chile) Universidad Católica)
—	MF	ARG	David Drocco (to (Argentina) Atlético Tucumán, on loan)
—	FW	ARG	Luciano Figueroa (to (Italy) Genoa, end of loan)
—	DF	ARG	Carlos Fondacaro (to (Argentina) Tigre, on loan)
—	DF	ARG	Juan Forlín (to (Spain) Espanyol)
—	MF	URU	Álvaro González (to (Uruguay) Nacional)
—	MF	ARG	Leandro Gracián (to (Greece) Aris Thessaloniki, on loan)
—	FW	ARG	Rodrigo Palacio (to (Italy) Genoa)
—	DF	ARG	Facundo Roncaglia (to (Spain) Espanyol, on loan)
—	MF	COL	Fabián Vargas (to (Spain) Almería)

=== Chacarita Juniors ===
In:

No.	Pos.	Nation	Player
—	FW	ARG	Germán Cano (from (Argentina) Lanús, loan)
—	GK	ARG	Sebastián Cejas (from (Italy) Pisa)
—	MF	ARG	Emanuel Centurión (from (Argentina) Independiente)
—	DF	ARG	Diego Crosa (free agent)
—	DF	ARG	Fernando Fontana (from (Argentina) Unión, on loan)
—	MF	ARG	Alejandro Frezzoti (from (Italy) Treviso, loan return)
—	FW	ARG	Cristian Milla (from Universidad de Chile, on loan)
—	DF	ARG	Franco Miranda (from (Scotland) St Mirren)
—	DF	PAR	Jorge Núñez (from (Argentina) Rosario Central)
—	FW	ARG	Facundo Parra (from (Greece) AEL, loan return)
—	MF	URU	Daniel Pereira (from (Chile) Universidad de Concepción, on loan)
—	MF	ARG	Sergio Ponce (from (Greece) Panthrakikos, loan return)
—	FW	ARG	Nicolás Ramírez (from (Argentina) Lanús)
—	FW	ARG	Sebastián Sciorilli (from (Argentina) Colón, on loan from (Argentina) River Plate)
—	MF	ARG	Omar Zarif (from (Argentina) Rosario Central)

Out:

No.	Pos.	Nation	Player
—	MF	ARG	Germán Basualdo (to (Argentina) Argentinos Juniors)
—	MF	ARG	Walter Coyette (released)
—	MF	ARG	Franco Dolci (to (Argentina) Newell's Old Boys)
—	FW	ARG	Daniel Giménez (to (Argentina) Los Andes)
—	MF	URU	Jorge Ignacio González (to (Argentina) San Martín de San Juan)
—	FW	ARG	Emanuel Herrera (to (Argentina) Rosario Central)
—	GK	ARG	Carlos Morel (to (Argentina) Sportivo Belgrano de San Francisco)
—	MF	ARG	Sergio Ortigoza (to (Argentina) Colegiales)
—	DF	ARG	Marcos Ramírez (to (Argentina) Defensa y Justicia, end of loan from (Argentina) Independiente)
—	DF	ARG	Héctor Daniel Romero (released)
—	MF	ARG	Jorge Rotondo (to (Argentina) Flandria)
—	DF	CHI	Cristian Suárez (to (Chile) O'Higgins)
—	FW	ARG	Javier Toledo (to (Saudi Arabia) Al-Ahli)

=== Colón de Santa Fe ===
In:

No.	Pos.	Nation	Player
—	MF	ARG	Cristian Barinaga (from (Paraguay) 2 de Mayo)
—	DF	ARG	Maximiliano Caire (from (Spain) Gimnàstic de Tarragona)
—	DF	ARG	Pablo De Miranda (from (Argentina) C.A.I.)
—	MF	ARG	Ricardo Gómez (from (Argentina) Gimnasia de Jujuy)
—	FW	ARG	Juan Manuel Lucero (from (Paraguay) Olimpia)
—	MF	ARG	Sebastián Malandra (from (Argentina) Olimpo)
—	FW	ARG	Federico Nieto (from (Argentina) Huracán)
—	MF	ARG	Cristian Pellerano (from (Argentina) Arsenal)
—	MF	ARG	Luis Solís (from (Argentina) Independiente Rivadavia, loan return)

Out:

No.	Pos.	Nation	Player
—	DF	ARG	Pablo Aguilar (to (Mexico) San Luis)
—	DF	ARG	Diego Chitzoff (to (Argentina) Rosario Central)
—	MF	ARG	Pablo Garnier (to (Argentina) Defensa y Justicia)
—	FW	URU	Marcelo Guerrero (to (Uruguay) Defensor Sporting)
—	DF	ARG	Franco Lazzaroni (to (Argentina) Tiro Federal)
—	FW	ARG	Leandro Ledesma (to (Argentina) Tiro Federal)
—	FW	COL	Daley Mena (to (Uruguay) Danubio)
—	MF	ARG	Matías Oyola (to (Ecuador) Barcelona, end of loan from (Argentina) Independiente)
—	MF	ARG	Sebastián Prediguer (to (Portugal) Porto)
—	MF	ARG	Pablo Rodríguez (released)
—	FW	ARG	Sebastián Sciorilli (to (Argentina) Chacarita Juniors, end of loan from (Argentina) River Plate)

=== Estudiantes de La Plata ===
In:

No.	Pos.	Nation	Player
—	MF	ARG	Marcelo Carrusca (from (Mexico) Cruz Azul, on loan from (Turkey) Galatasaray)
—	GK	PAR	Roberto Fernández (from (Paraguay) Cerro Porteño)
—	FW	ARG	Leandro González (from (Argentina) Racing)
—	FW	ARG	Jerónimo Morales Neumann (from (Argentina) Instituto)
—	DF	ARG	Clemente Rodríguez (from (Russia) Spartak Moscow)
—	GK	ARG	César Taborda (from (Chile) Everton, loan return)

Out:

No.	Pos.	Nation	Player
—	GK	ARG	Mariano Andújar (to (Italy) Catania)
—	MF	ARG	Maximiliano Badell (to (Argentina) Nueva Chicago, on loan)
—	FW	URU	Mauricio Carrasco (to (Argentina) Quilmes, on loan)
—	GK	ARG	Mauro Dobler (to (Argentina) Racing)
—	FW	ARG	Gastón Fernández (to (Mexico) UANL, end of loan)
—	FW	ARG	Milton Galiana (to (Argentina) San Martín de San Juan)
—	MF	ARG	Diego Galván (to (Argentina) Arsenal)
—	MF	ARG	Jonathan Germano (to (Croatia) Rijeka)
—	MF	PAR	Édgar González (to (Peru) Alianza Lima)
—	FW	ARG	Ramón Lentini (to (Argentina) Quilmes, on loan)
—	MF	ARG	Leonardo Marcelo Morales (to (Argentina) Arsenal)
—	MF	ARG	Cristian Sánchez Prette (to (Argentina) Newell's Old Boys, end of loan from (Romania) Cluj)
—	MF	ARG	Gonzalo Saucedo (to (Argentina) Unión on loan)
—	DF	ARG	Rolando Schiavi (to (Argentina) Newell's Old Boys, end of loan)
—	MF	ARG	Rafael Sosa (to (Albania) Dinamo Tirana)
—	MF	COL	Carlos Valencia (to (Argentina) Godoy Cruz)
—	MF	ARG	Juan Ignacio Vinaccia (to (Argentina) Nueva Chicago)

=== Gimnasia y Esgrima La Plata ===
In:

No.	Pos.	Nation	Player
—	DF	ARG	Joel Carli (from (Argentina) Aldosivi)
—	FW	ARG	Sebastián Ereros (from (Slovakia) Trenčín, on loan from (Argentina) Vélez Sársfield)
—	FW	COL	Marco Pérez (from (Colombia) Boyacá Chicó)
—	FW	ARG	José Vizcarra (from (Argentina) Rosario Central)

Out:

No.	Pos.	Nation	Player
—	MF	ARG	Reinaldo Alderete (to (Israel) Maccabi Petah Tikva)
—	FW	URU	Diego Alonso (to (Uruguay) Peñarol)
—	MF	ARG	Jonathan Chávez (to (Argentina) Defensa y Justicia)
—	MF	ARG	Agustín Domenez (to (Argentina) Nueva Chicago)
—	MF	ARG	Mariano Fernández (to (Argentina) Rivadavia)
—	DF	ARG	Abel Masuero (to (Argentina) Ferro Carril Oeste)
—	FW	ARG	Franco Niell (to (Ecuador) Deportivo Quito, end of loan from (Argentina) Argentinos Juniors)
—	DF	ARG	Cristian Piarrou (to (Argentina) Quilmes)
—	MF	ARG	Ignacio Piatti (to (Argentina) Independiente)
—	FW	ARG	Antonio Piergüidi (released)
—	DF	ARG	Jorge San Esteban (to (Argentina) Villa San Carlos)

=== Godoy Cruz ===
In:

No.	Pos.	Nation	Player
—	FW	ARG	Cristian Chávez (from (Argentina) San Lorenzo, on loan)
—	DF	URU	Jorge Curbelo (from (Uruguay) Defensor Sporting)
—	DF	ARG	Zelmar García (from (Argentina) Deportivo Merlo)
—	FW	ARG	Federico Higuaín (from (Argentina) Independiente)
—	FW	ARG	Matías Jara (from (Argentina) C.A.I.)
—	DF	ARG	Luis Lobo (from (Venezuela) Deportivo Anzoátegui)
—	GK	ARG	José Fabián Ramírez (from (Argentina) Almagro)
—	FW	ARG	Rodrigo Salinas (from (Argentina) Villa San Carlos)
—	MF	ARG	Sebastián Salomón (from (Argentina) Lanús)
—	MF	ARG	Leandro Torres (from (Argentina) Newell's Old Boys)
—	DF	ARG	Diego Trotta (from (Spain) Albacete)
—	MF	COL	Carlos Valencia (from (Argentina) Estudiantes de La Plata)
—	FW	ARG	Daniel Vega (from (Argentina) San Martín de Tucumán)

Out:

No.	Pos.	Nation	Player
—	FW	ARG	Iván Borghello (to (Ecuador) Deportivo Quito)
—	GK	ARG	Jorge Carranza (to (Argentina) Instituto de Córdoba, end of loan)
—	FW	ARG	Leandro Caruso (to (Argentina) Vélez Sársfield on loan from (Italy) Udinese)
—	FW	COL	Jairo Castillo (to (Colombia) Millionarios)
—	MF	ARG	Marcio Conejero (to (Argentina) Gimnasia de Mendoza)
—	MF	ARG	Gonzalo Díaz (to (Argentina) Lanús, on loan)
—	MF	ARG	Hernán Encina (to (Ecuador) Barcelona)
—	MF	ARG	Martín Fabro (to (Argentina) Deportivo Merlo)
—	MF	ARG	Víctor Figueroa (to (Saudi Arabia) Al-Nassr)
—	DF	ARG	Guillermo Franco (to (Argentina) Independiente Rivadavia, on loan)
—	FW	PER	Roberto Jiménez (to (Peru) Sporting Cristal)
—	MF	ARG	Cristian Leiva (to (Argentina) San Lorenzo)
—	MF	ARG	Emiliano Páez (to (Argentina) Gimnasia de Mendoza)
—	FW	CHI	Sebastián Pinto (to (Chile) Audax Italiano)

=== Huracán ===
In:

No.	Pos.	Nation	Player
—	FW	ARG	Leandro Benegas (from (Argentina) River Plate)
—	MF	ARG	Juan Carlos Carrizo (from (Romania) Universitatea Cluj)
—	MF	ARG	Nicolás De Bruno (from (Peru) José Gálvez)
—	MF	ARG	Rodrigo Díaz (from (Brazil) Atlético Paranaense)
—	DF	ARG	Gonzalo García (from (Argentina) Racing, on loan)
—	DF	ARG	Pablo Jerez (from (Argentina) Tigre, on loan from (Argentina) Colón)
—	FW	ARG	Federico Laurito (from (Italy) Venezia, on loan from (Italy) Udinese)
—	MF	ARG	Rodrigo Malbernat (from (Argentina) Acassuso)
—	MF	ARG	Cristian Ortiz (from (Argentina) Real Arroyo Seco)
—	MF	URU	Diego Rodríguez (from (Italy) Bologna)
—	FW	ARG	Lucas Trecarichi (from (Spain) Sevilla Atlético, on loan)

Out:

No.	Pos.	Nation	Player
—	DF	ARG	Carlos Arano (to (Greece) Aris Thessaloniki)
—	DF	ARG	Carlos Araujo (to (Greece) AEK)
—	MF	ARG	Gastón Beraldi (released)
—	FW	ARG	Ariel Cólzera (to (Argentina) Unión)
—	FW	ARG	Matías De Federico (to (Brazil) Corinthians)
—	MF	VEN	César González (to (Mexico) San Luis)
—	GK	COL	David González (released)
—	FW	URU	Leonardo Medina (to (Bolivia) Oriente Petrolero)
—	MF	ARG	Sergio Meza Sánchez (to (Argentina) Quilmes)
—	DF	ARG	Iván Nadal (to (Latvia) Ventspils)
—	FW	ARG	Federico Nieto (to (Argentina) Colón)
—	FW	ARG	Fernando Pagés (to (Argentina) Unión)
—	MF	ARG	Javier Pastore (to (Italy) Palermo)

=== Independiente ===
In:

No.	Pos.	Nation	Player
—	MF	ARG	Walter Acevedo (from (Ukraine) Metalist Kharkiv, on loan)
—	MF	ARG	Walter Busse (from (Argentina) Gimnasia de Jujuy)
—	FW	ARG	Martín Gómez (from (Argentina) Independiente Rivadavia)
—	FW	ARG	Federico González (from (Argentina) Ferro Carril Oeste, loan return)
—	MF	ARG	Nicolás Martínez (from (Argentina) Almirante Brown)
—	DF	ARG	Carlos Matheu (from (Italy) Cagliari)
—	GK	ARG	Hilario Navarro (from (Argentina) San Lorenzo, loan return)
—	MF	ARG	Ignacio Piatti (from (Argentina) Gimnasia de La Plata)
—	FW	ARG	Andrés Silvera (from (Argentina) San Lorenzo)
—	DF	ARG	Luciano Vella (from (Romania) Rapid București)

Out:

No.	Pos.	Nation	Player
—	GK	ARG	Fabián Assmann (to (Spain) Las Palmas, on loan)
—	FW	ARG	Alexis Blanco (to (Argentina) Sportivo Italiano, on loan)
—	DF	ARG	Emanuel Bocchino (to (Argentina) Quilmes, on loan)
—	DF	ARG	Juan Caracoche (to (Argentina) Sportivo Italiano, on loan)
—	MF	ARG	Emanuel Centurión (to (Argentina) Chacarita Juniors)
—	DF	ARG	Nicolás Delmonte (to (Albania) Dinamo Tirana, on loan)
—	FW	ARG	Leandro Depetris (to (Italy) Gallipolu)
—	DF	ARG	Matías Di Gregorio (to (Argentina) Quilmes, on loan)
—	MF	ARG	Hernán Fredes (to (Ukraine) Metalist Kharkiv, on loan)
—	DF	ARG	Leandro Gioda (to (Spain) Xerez)
—	FW	ARG	Federico Higuaín (to (Argentina) Godoy Cruz)
—	DF	ARG	Juan Lapietra (to (Argentina) Deportivo Merlo)
—	DF	ARG	Damián Ledesma (to (Argentina) Racing)
—	FW	ARG	Daniel Montenegro (to (Mexico) América)
—	FW	COL	José Moreno (to (Peru) Juan Aurich)
—	MF	ARG	Leonel Ríos (to (Greece) Asteras Tripolis)
—	DF	URU	Guillermo Rodríguez (to (Uruguay) Peñarol)
—	FW	ARG	Ismael Sosa (to (Argentina) Argentinos Juniors)

=== Lanús ===
In:

No.	Pos.	Nation	Player
—	MF	ARG	Marcos Aguirre (from (Spain) Real Valladolid, loan return)
—	MF	ARG	Gonzalo Díaz (from (Argentina) Godoy Cruz, on loan)
—	MF	ARG	Agustín Pelletieri (from (Greece) AEK, loan return)
—	FW	PAR	Santiago Salcedo (from (Argentina) Newell's Old Boys)

Out:

No.	Pos.	Nation	Player
—	MF	ARG	Leandro Benítez (to (Argentina) Newell's)
—	GK	ARG	Carlos Bossio (to (Mexico) Querétaro)
—	FW	ARG	Germán Cano (to (Argentina) Chacarita Juniors, on loan)
—	DF	ARG	Rodolfo Graieb (released)
—	DF	ARG	Gastón Lolli (to (Argentina) Atlanta, on loan)
—	GK	ARG	Fabián Moyano (to (Argentina) Atlanta, on loan)
—	FW	ARG	Nicolás Ramírez (to (Argentina) Chacarita Juniors)
—	MF	ARG	Sebastián Salomón (to (Argentina) Godoy Cruz)
—	FW	ARG	José Sand (to (United Arab Emirates) Al Ain)
—	MF	ARG	Diego Valeri (to (Portugal) Porto, on loan)

=== Newell's Old Boys ===
In:

No.	Pos.	Nation	Player
—	FW	PAR	Jorge Achucarro (from (Mexico) Atlas)
—	MF	ARG	Hugo Barrientos (free agent)
—	MF	ARG	Leandro Benítez (from (Argentina) Lanús)
—	FW	URU	Joaquín Boghossian (from (Uruguay) Cerro)
—	MF	ARG	Franco Dolci (from (Argentina) Chacarita Juniors)
—	GK	ARG	Nahuel Guzmán (from (Argentina) Independiente Rivadavia, loan return)
—	DF	ARG	Augusto Mainguyague (from (Bolivia) Bolívar, loan return)
—	MF	ARG	Diego Mateo (from (Argentina) Gimnasia de Jujuy)
—	FW	ARG	Cristian Núñez (from (Argentina) Boca Unidos)
—	MF	ARG	Matías Quiroga (from (Argentina) Talleres de Córdoba)
—	DF	ARG	Nahuel Roselli (from (Argentina) Aldosivi)
—	MF	ARG	Cristian Sánchez Prette (from (Argentina) Estudiantes de La Plata, on loan from (Romania) Cluj)
—	DF	ARG	Rolando Schiavi (from (Argentina) Estudiantes de La Plata, loan return)
—	MF	ARG	Martín Seri (from (Argentina) San Martín de San Juan, loan return)

Out:

No.	Pos.	Nation	Player
—	FW	ARG	Leandro Armani (to (Argentina) Tiro Federal, end of loan)
—	MF	ARG	Hernán Bernardello (to (Spain) Almería)
—	MF	PAR	Ernesto Cristaldo (to (Paraguay) Cerro Porteño)
—	MF	ARG	Matías Donnet (to (Argentina) Unión)
—	FW	ARG	Emanuel Lazzarini (to (Chile) Cobreloa)
—	MF	ARG	Pablo Monsalvo (to (Argentina) Racing)
—	MF	ARG	Marcelo Penta (to (Greece) Pierikos)
—	MF	ARG	Pablo Pérez (to (Ecuador) Emelec)
—	DF	ARG	Iván Pillud (to (Spain) Espanyol, end of loan from (Argentina) Tiro Federal)
—	MF	ARG	Gustavo Pinto (released)
—	FW	PAR	Santiago Salcedo (to (Argentina) Lanús)
—	DF	ARG	Nicolás Spolli (to (Italy) Catania)
—	FW	ARG	Damián Steinert (to (Argentina) Racing, end of loan)
—	MF	ARG	Leandro Torres (to (Argentina) Godoy Cruz)

=== Racing Club ===
In:

No.	Pos.	Nation	Player
—	MF	ARG	Marcos Brítez Ojeda (from (Argentina) Los Andes)
—	DF	ARG	Matias Cahais (from (Argentina) Gimnasia de Jujuy, on loan from (Argentina) Boca Juniors)
—	GK	ARG	Jorge De Olivera (from (Argentina) Nueva Chicago)
—	GK	ARG	Mauro Dobler (from (Argentina) Estudiantes de La Plata)
—	MF	ARG	Damián Ledesma (from (Argentina) Independiente)
—	DF	ARG	Diego Menghi (from (Argentina) Atlético Rafaela, end of loan)
—	MF	ARG	Nicolás Minici (from (Argentina) Social Español)
—	MF	ARG	Pablo Monsalvo (from (Argentina) Newell's Old Boys)
—	MF	URU	Sebastian Rosano (from (Argentina) Tigre)
—	GK	ARG	Pablo Santillo (from (Ecuador) Barcelona, on loan from (Argentina) Banfield)
—	FW	ARG	Damián Steinert (from (Argentina) Newell's Old Boys)
—	DF	ARG	Cristian Tavio (from (Argentina) San Martín de San Juan)
—	FW	ARG	Javier Velázquez (from (Argentina) Defensores Unidos)

Out:

No.	Pos.	Nation	Player
—	GK	ARG	Gustavo Campagnuolo (to (Argentina) San Lorenzo)
—	MF	ARG	José Chatruc (to (Argentina) Tiro Federal)
—	DF	ARG	Gonzalo García (to (Argentina) Huracán, on loan)
—	FW	ARG	Leandro González (to (Argentina) Estudiantes de La Plata)
—	GK	ARG	Pablo Migliore (to (Argentina) San Lorenzo, end of loan from (Argentina) Boca Juniors)
—	DF	ARG	Franco Peppino (to (Argentina) Arsenal de Sarandí, on loan)
—	GK	ARG	Matías Piñal (to (Argentina) San Telmo)
—	MF	ARG	Lihué Prichoda (to (Argentina) San Martín de Tucumán)
—	DF	ARG	José Shaffer (to (Portugal) Benfica)
—	DF	ARG	Franco Sosa (to (France) Lorient)
—	FW	URU	Nicolás Vigneri (to (Mexico) Puebla)
—	MF	ARG	Franco Zuculini (to (Germany) TSG Hoffenheim)

=== River Plate ===
In:

No.	Pos.	Nation	Player
—	MF	ARG	Matías Almeyda (from (Argentina) Fénix)
—	DF	PAR	Javier Cohene (from (Portugal) Olhanense)
—	MF	ARG	Matías Díaz (from (Argentina) San Martín de San Juan, end of loan)
—	GK	ARG	Nicolás Navarro (from (Italy) Napoli, on loan)
—	FW	ARG	Ariel Ortega (from (Argentina) Independiente Rivadavia, end of loan)
—	MF	PAR	Miguel Ángel Paniagua (from (Paraguay) Guaraní, on loan)
—	MF	ARG	Andrés San Martín (from (Argentina) Arsenal, end of loan)

Out:

No.	Pos.	Nation	Player
—	GK	ARG	Mariano Barbosa (to (Mexico) Atlas)
—	MF	ARG	Leandro Benegas (to (Argentina) Huracán, on loan)
—	MF	ARG	Augusto Fernández (to (France) Saint-Étienne, on loan)
—	FW	COL	Radamel Falcao (to (Portugal) Porto)
—	FW	URU	Robert Flores (to (Spain) Villarreal, end of loan)
—	DF	ARG	Danilo Gerlo (released)
—	DF	ARG	Nelson González (to (Argentina) Sarmiento)
—	MF	ARG	Damián Lizio (to (Spain) Córdoba, on loan)
—	DF	ARG	Emmanuel Martínez (to (Argentina) Ferro Carril Oeste)
—	DF	ARG	Mateo Musacchio (to (Spain) Villarreal B)
—	MF	ARG	Rubens Sambueza (to (Mexico) Estudiantes Tecos)
—	FW	ARG	Eial Strahman (to (Israel) Maccabi Haifa)

=== Rosario Central ===
In:

No.	Pos.	Nation	Player
—	FW	ARG	Germán Alemanno (from (Argentina) Platense, end of loan)
—	DF	ECU	Paúl Ambrosi (from (Ecuador) LDU Quito)
—	MF	ARG	Martín Astudillo (from (Spain) Deportivo Alavés, on loan)
—	DF	ARG	Diego Chitzoff (from (Argentina) Colón)
—	DF	ARG	Ramiro Fassi (from (Argentina) Quilmes, end of loan)
—	FW	ARG	Emanuel Herrera (from (Argentina) Chacarita Juniors)
—	DF	ARG	Andrés Imperiale (from (Bolivia) Oriente Petrolero, end of loan)
—	MF	ARG	Darío Ocampo (from (Argentina) Vélez Sársfield)

Out:

No.	Pos.	Nation	Player
—	DF	ARG	Pablo Álvarez (to (Italy) Catania, end of loan)
—	MF	ARG	Leonardo Borzani (released)
—	MF	ARG	Matías Escobar (to (Argentina) Atlético Tucumán)
—	DF	ARG	Martín García (to (Argentina) San Martín de Tucumán)
—	MF	ARG	Ezequiel González (to (Brazil) Fluminense)
—	MF	ARG	Kily González (to (Argentina) San Lorenzo)
—	DF	URU	Pablo Lima (to (Argentina) Vélez Sársfield, end of loan)
—	MF	ESP	Iván Moreno y Fabianesi (to (Greece) Skoda Xanthi, end of loan from (Argentina) Estudiantes LP)
—	DF	PAR	Jorge Núñez (to (Argentina) Chacarita Juniors)
—	DF	ARG	Walter Ribonetto (to (Argentina) Quilmes)
—	FW	ARG	Emmanuel Serra (to (Ecuador) Técnico Universitario)
—	FW	ARG	José Vizcarra (to (Argentina) Gimnasia de La Plata)
—	MF	ARG	Omar Zarif (to (Argentina) Chacarita Juniors)

=== San Lorenzo ===
In:

No.	Pos.	Nation	Player
—	GK	ARG	Gustavo Campagnuolo (from (Argentina) Racing)
—	FW	ARG	Maximiliano Ceratto (from (Argentina) Defensores de Belgrano, will join club after Apertura tournament)
—	DF	ARG	Renato Civelli (from (France) Olympique de Marseille)
—	MF	ARG	Kily González (from (Argentina) Rosario Central)
—	MF	ARG	Cristian Leiva (from (Argentina) Godoy Cruz)
—	DF	ARG	Sebastián Luna (from (Argentina) Quilmes)
—	FW	ARG	Juan Carlos Menseguez (from (England) West Bromwich Albion, loan return)
—	FW	ARG	Víctor Meza (from (Argentina) Sportivo Italiano)
—	GK	ARG	Pablo Migliore (from (Argentina) Racing)
—	MF	NGR	Felix Orode ( (Nigeria) Sharks)
—	DF	URU	Pablo Pintos (from (Uruguay) Defensor Sporting)
—	MF	ARG	Leandro Romagnoli (from (Portugal) Sporting CP)
—	GK	ARG	Matías Vega (from (Argentina) Platense)

Out:

No.	Pos.	Nation	Player
—	MF	ARG	Pablo Alvarado (to (Argentina) Belgrano, on loan)
—	MF	ARG	Pablo Barrientos (to (Italy) Catania, end of loan from (Russia) FC Moscow)
—	FW	ARG	Gonzalo Bergessio (to (France) Saint-Étienne)
—	DF	ARG	Nicolás Bianchi Arce (to (Greece) AEK Athens, on loan)
—	FW	ARG	Cristian Chávez (to (Argentina) Godoy Cruz, on loan)
—	FW	URU	Bruno Fornaroli (to (Italy) Sampdoria, end of loan)
—	DF	ARG	Adrián González (to (Brazil) São Paulo)
—	MF	ARG	Cristian Ledesma (to (Greece) Olympiacos, end of loan)
—	DF	ARG	Sebastián Méndez (to (Argentina) Banfield)
—	GK	ARG	Hilario Navarro (to (Argentina) Independiente, end of loan)
—	FW	ARG	Hernán Peirone (to (Ecuador) Emelec)
—	MF	PAR	Jonathan Santana (to (Germany) VfL Wolfsburg, end of loan)
—	FW	ARG	Andrés Silvera (to (Argentina) Independiente)
—	MF	ARG	Santiago Solari (to (Mexico) Atlanta)
—	DF	ARG	Cristian Tula (to (Argentina) Arsenal de Sarandí, on loan)

=== Tigre ===
In:

No.	Pos.	Nation	Player
—	FW	PAR	Julio Aguilar (from (Mexico) UANL)
—	DF	ARG	Carlos Fondacaro (from (Argentina) Boca Juniors)
—	FW	ARG	Juan Pablo Garat (from (Switzerland) St. Gallen)
—	MF	ARG	Ramiro Leone (from (Argentina) San Martín de Tucumán)
—	MF	ARG	Juan Maldonado (from (Argentina) Racing de Olavarría)
—	DF	PAR	Julio Manzur (from (Paraguay) Libertad)
—	MF	PAR	José Montiel (from (Romania) Politehnica Iaşi, on loan from (Italy) Reggina)

Out:

No.	Pos.	Nation	Player
—	FW	ARG	Leonel Altobelli (to (Spain) Albacete)
—	FW	ARG	Jeremías Attadía (to (Argentina) Comunicaciones)
—	DF	ARG	Juan Carlos Blengio (to (Greece) Atromitos)
—	MF	ARG	Rubén Botta (to (Latvia) Ventspils)
—	MF	ARG	Pablo Espinoza (to (Argentina) Almagro)
—	DF	ARG	Pablo Fontanello (to (Italy) Parma)
—	DF	ARG	Pablo Jerez (to (Argentina) Colón, end of loan)
—	MF	ARG	Sebastian Rosano (to (Argentina) Racing)
—	MF	ARG	Sebastián Rusculleda (to (Saudi Arabia) Al-Ahli)
—	FW	ARG	Mauro Villegas (to (Argentina) C.A.I., end of loan)

=== Vélez Sársfield ===
In:

No.	Pos.	Nation	Player
—	FW	ARG	Leandro Caruso (from (Argentina) Godoy Cruz on loan from (Italy) Udinese)
—	DF	URU	Pablo Lima (from (Argentina) Rosario Central, loan return)
—	MF	ARG	Javier Robles (from (Argentina) Olimpo, loan return)
—	FW	ARG	Rolando Zárate (from (Ecuador) Barcelona)

Out:

No.	Pos.	Nation	Player
—	FW	ARG	Joaquín Larrivey (to (Italy) Cagliari, end of loan)
—	FW	ARG	Roberto Nanni (to (Paraguay) Cerro Porteño)
—	MF	ARG	Darío Ocampo (to (Argentina) Rosario Central)
—	DF	ARG	Carlos Soto (to (Argentina) All Boys)

== January (Summer) transfer window ==
=== Argentinos Juniors ===
In:

No.	Pos.	Nation	Player
—	FW	ARG	José Luis Calderón (from (Argentina) Estudiantes de La Plata)
—	GK	ARG	Luis Ojeda (from (Argentina) Unión de Santa Fe)
—	FW	CHI	Emilio Hernández (from (Mexico) Cruz Azul)
—	DF	ARG	Santiago Gentiletti (from (Chile) O'Higgins)

Out:

No.	Pos.	Nation	Player
—	FW	ARG	Gabriel Hauche (to (Argentina) Racing)
—	DF	URU	Andrés Scotti (to (Chile) Colo-Colo)
—	MF	ARG	Mauro Bogado (to (Chile) Everton)
—	MF	ARG	Franco Quiroga (to (Chile) Santiago Wanderers)
—	FW	ARG	Diego García (to (Argentina) Independiente Rivadavia)
—	DF	ARG	Juan Carlos Ojeda (to (Argentina) Estudiantes de La Plata, end of loan)
—	MF	ARG	Carlos Santibáñez (to (Chile) Santiago Morning)
—	GK	ARG	Sebastián Torrico (to (Argentina) Godoy Cruz, end of loan)
—	DF	ARG	Maximiliano Sola (to (Colombia) Unión Magdalena)
—	MF	ARG	René Lima (to (Uruguay) Fénix)
—	GK	ARG	Diego Morales (to (Peru) Juan Aurich)

=== Arsenal de Sarandí ===
In:

No.	Pos.	Nation	Player
—	FW	ARG	Mauro Óbolo (from (Sweden) AIK)
—	MF	ARG	Nicolás Domingo (from (Argentina) River Plate)
—	FW	ARG	Luciano Leguizamón (from (Saudi Arabia) Al-Ittihad)

Out:

No.	Pos.	Nation	Player
—	MF	ARG	Nahuel Sachetto (to (Argentina) Gimnasia de Jujuy)
—	DF	ARG	Víctor Cuesta (to (Argentina) Defensa y Justicia)
—	DF	ARG	Mariano Brau (to (Argentina) All Boys)
—	MF	ARG	Damián Perez (released)
—	FW	ARG	Mauro Matos (to (Argentina) All Boys)
—	FW	ARG	Darío Benedetto (to (Argentina) Defensa y Justicia)
—	FW	URU	Alexander Medina (to (Chile) Unión Española)

=== Atlético Tucumán ===
In:

No.	Pos.	Nation	Player
—	DF	ARG	Ricardo Moreira (from (Argentina) Independiente)
—	MF	PAR	Claudio Vargas Villalba (from (Paraguay) Olimpia)

Out:

No.	Pos.	Nation	Player
—	FW	ARG	Pablo Calandria (to (Chile) Santiago Morning)
—	DF	ARG	Héctor Desvaux (to (Chile) Santiago Wanderers)
—	MF	ARG	Matías García (to (Chile) Huachipato)

=== Banfield ===
In:

No.	Pos.	Nation	Player
—	FW	ARG	Rubén Ramírez (from (Argentina) Racing)
—	DF	ARG	José Shaffer (from (Portugal) Benfica)
—	MF	URU	Mathías Cardacio (from (Uruguay) Nacional)
—	DF	ARG	Jonathan Maidana (from (Ukraine) Metalist Kharkiv)

Out:

No.	Pos.	Nation	Player
—	FW	URU	Santiago Silva (to (Argentina) Vélez Sársfield, end of loan)
—	MF	ARG	Daniel Bilos (retired)
—	DF	ARG	Sebastián Méndez (retired)

=== Boca Juniors ===
In:

No.	Pos.	Nation	Player
—	MF	ARG	Jesús Méndez (from (Argentina) Rosario Central)
—	MF	ARG	Matías Giménez (from (Argentina) Tigre)
—	MF	ARG	Sebastián Prediguer (from (Portugal) Porto, on loan)
—	DF	BRA	Luiz Alberto (from (Brazil) Fluminense)

Out:

No.	Pos.	Nation	Player
—	FW	ARG	Lucas Pratto (to (Argentina) Unión)
—	DF	PAR	Julio César Cáceres (to (Brazil) Atlético Mineiro)
—	MF	ARG	Exequiel Benavídez (to (Argentina) Tiro Federal)
—	GK	ARG	Maximiliano Scaparonni (to (Chile) Ñublense)
—	MF	ARG	Sebastián Vidal (to (Argentina) C.A.I.)
—	MF	ARG	Gonzalo Cabrera (released)
—	GK	ARG	Roberto Abbondanzieri (to (Brazil) SC Internacional)
—	MF	ARG	Sebastián Alberto Battaglia (to (Argentina) Quilmes)
—	FW	ARG	Marcos Mondaini (to (Colombia) Atlético Nacional)
—	FW	ARG	Ricardo Noir (to (Ecuador) Barcelona SC)

=== Chacarita Juniors ===
In:

No.	Pos.	Nation	Player
—	FW	URU	Maureen Franco (from (Uruguay) Cerrito)
—	FW	ARG	Christian Giménez (to (Switzerland) Locarno)

Out:

No.	Pos.	Nation	Player
—	FW	ARG	Juan Manuel Aróstegui (to (Argentina) Aldosivi)
—	FW	ARG	Cristian Milla (to (Argentina) Almagro, end of loan from Universidad de Chile)
—	MF	ARG	Jose Luis Gómez (to (Argentina) All Boys)
—	DF	ARG	Cristian Gutiérrez (to (Argentina) Deportivo Merlo)
—	DF	ARG	Fernando Fontana (to (Argentina) Atlético Rafaela)
—	DF	ARG	Franco Miranda (to (Argentina) C.A.I.)
—	FW	ARG	Gustavo Alustiza (to (Spain) Xerez)

=== Colón de Santa Fe ===
In:

No.	Pos.	Nation	Player
—	MF	ESP	Iván Moreno y Fabianesi (from (Greece) Skoda Xanthi)
—	FW	ARG	Andrés Ríos (from (Mexico) Atlas)
—	MF	ARG	Eduardo Coudet (from (Mexico) San Luis)
—	DF	COL	Josimar Mosquera (from (Saudi Arabia) Al-Ahli)

Out:

No.	Pos.	Nation	Player
—	DF	ARG	Alexis Ferrero (to (Argentina) River Plate)
—	MF	ARG	Cristian Barinaga (to (Argentina) Defensa y Justicia)
—	FW	ARG	Fabián Castillo (to (Argentina) Ben Hur)
—	MF	ARG	Sebastián Malandra (to (Chile) Ñublense)

=== Estudiantes de La Plata ===
In:

No.	Pos.	Nation	Player
—	GK	ARG	Agustín Orión (from (Argentina) San Lorenzo)
—	MF	ARG	José Ernesto Sosa (from (Germany) Bayern Munich)
—	MF	ARG	Darío Stefanatto (from (Argentina) All Boys)

Out:

No.	Pos.	Nation	Player
—	FW	ARG	José Luis Calderón (to (Argentina) Argentinos Juniors)
—	DF	URU	Juan Manuel Díaz (to (Argentina) River Plate)
—	DF	ARG	Agustín Alayes (to (Argentina) Newell's Old Boys)
—	FW	URU	Juan Manuel Salgueiro (to (Ecuador) LDU Quito)
—	MF	ARG	Juan Huerta (to (Chile) San Luis Quillota)

=== Gimnasia y Esgrima La Plata ===
In:

No.	Pos.	Nation	Player
—	MF	ARG	Hernán Encina (from (Ecuador) Barcelona)
—	FW	ARG	Gastón Casas (from (Greece) AEL, on loan)
—	DF	ARG	Facundo Imboden (from (Chile) Universidad Católica)
—	FW	URU	Álvaro Navarro (from (Uruguay) Defensor Sporting)

Out:

No.	Pos.	Nation	Player
—	FW	ARG	Sebastián Ereros (to (Paraguay) Cerro Porteño, end of loan from Vélez Sársfield)
—	DF	ARG	Lucas Landa (to (Ecuador) Barcelona)
—	DF	ARG	Marcelo Cardozo (to (Argentina) Defensa y Justicia)
—	MF	ARG	Pablo De Blasis (to (Argentina) Ferro)

=== Godoy Cruz ===
In:

No.	Pos.	Nation	Player
—	FW	ARG	César Carranza (from (Chile) Colo-Colo)
—	MF	URU	Carlos Sánchez (from (Uruguay) Liverpool)
—	FW	COL	Jairo Castillo (from (Colombia) Millionarios)
—	MF	ARG	David Ramírez (from (Chile) Unión Española)
—	GK	ARG	Sebastián Torrico (from (Argentina) Argentinos Juniors, end of loan)

Out:

No.	Pos.	Nation	Player
—	DF	ARG	Diego Trotta (to (Argentina) San Martín de Tucumán)
—	DF	ARG	Luis Lobo (released)
—	MF	COL	Carlos Valencia (to (Paraguay) Sportivo Luqueño)
—	MF	ARG	Sebastián Salomón (released)
—	DF	ARG	Gabriel Valles (free agent, signed with (Argentina) Independiente)
—	FW	ARG	Matías Jara (to (Chile) Huachipato)

=== Huracán ===
In:

No.	Pos.	Nation	Player
—	MF	ARG	Adrián Peralta (from (Argentina) Lanús)
—	MF	ARG	Gastón Machín (from (Argentina) Independiente)
—	FW	ARG	Andrés Franzoia (from (Argentina) Rosario Central)
—	FW	ARG	Gustavo Balvorín (from (Greece) Levadiakos)

Out:

No.	Pos.	Nation	Player
—	MF	ARG	Rodrigo Díaz (to (Argentina) Independiente Rivadavia)
—	MF	ARG	Mario Bolatti (to (Italy) Fiorentina)
—	FW	ARG	Lucas Trecarichi (to (Spain) Sevilla Atlético, end of loan)
—	FW	ARG	Nicolás Trecco (released)
—	MF	ARG	Juan Carlos Carrizo (released)
—	MF	ARG	Nicolás De Bruno (released)

=== Independiente ===
In:

No.	Pos.	Nation	Player
—	MF	ARG	Leandro Gracián (from (Greece) Aris Thessaloniki)
—	MF	ARG	Hernán Fredes (from (Ukraine) Metalist Kharkiv, end of loan)
—	MF	ARG	Mariano Herrón (from (Colombia) Deportivo Cali)
—	DF	ARG	Gabriel Vallés (from (Argentina) Godoy Cruz)

Out:

No.	Pos.	Nation	Player
—	DF	ARG	Ricardo Moreira (to (Argentina) Atlético Tucumán)
—	FW	ARG	Diego Churín (to (Argentina) Platense)
—	MF	ARG	Gastón Machín (to (Argentina) Huracán)

=== Lanús ===
In:

No.	Pos.	Nation	Player
—	FW	ARG	Gonzalo Castillejos (from (Argentina) Rosario Central)

Out:

No.	Pos.	Nation	Player
—	FW	ARG	Eduardo Salvio (to (Spain) Atlético Madrid)
—	MF	ARG	Adrián Peralta (to (Argentina) Huracán)
—	FW	ARG	Santiago Biglieri (to (Ecuador) Emelec)
—	MF	ARG	Gonzalo Díaz (to (Argentina) Gimnazia de Mendoza)
—	FW	ARG	Roverto Dovetta (to (Argentina) Ferro)
—	DF	ARG	Iván Macalik (to (Chile) Unión San Felipe)

=== Newell's Old Boys ===
In:

No.	Pos.	Nation	Player
—	DF	ARG	Agustín Alayes (from (Argentina) Estudiantes de La Plata)
—	FW	PAR	Marcelo Estigarribia (from (France) Le Mans, on loan)

Out:

No.	Pos.	Nation	Player
—	GK	ARG	Germán Caffa (to (Paraguay) Nacional)
—	DF	ARG	Pablo Aguilar (to (Argentina) Tiro Federal)
—	FW	PAR	Alejandro Da Silva (to (Chile) Santiago Wanderers)
—	FW	ARG	Juan Manuel Cobelli (to (Chile) Municipal Iquique)
—	DF	ARG	Augusto Mainguyague (to (Argentina) Instituto)

=== Racing Club ===
In:

No.	Pos.	Nation	Player
—	FW	ARG	Gabriel Hauche (from (Argentina) Argentinos Juniors)
—	FW	ARG	Claudio Bieler (from (Ecuador) LDU Quito)
—	DF	ARG	Lucas Licht (from (Spain) Getafe)
—	DF	ARG	Roberto Ayala (from (Spain) Zaragoza)

Out:

No.	Pos.	Nation	Player
—	FW	ARG	Rubén Ramírez (to (Argentina) Banfield)
—	FW	ARG	Javier Velázquez (to (Argentina) Independiente Rivadavia)
—	FW	ARG	Diego Menghi (to (Chile) San Luis Quillota)
—	MF	ARG	Pablo Monsalvo (to (Argentina) Instituto)
—	MF	ARG	Juan Manuel Salto (to (Greece) Ionikos)
—	GK	ARG	Matías Piñal (to (Ecuador) River Plate de Guayaquil)

=== River Plate ===
In:

No.	Pos.	Nation	Player
—	MF	PAR	Rodrigo Rojas (from (Paraguay) Olimpia)
—	FW	ARG	Gustavo Canales (from (Chile) Unión Española)
—	DF	URU	Juan Manuel Díaz (from (Argentina) Estudiantes de La Plata)
—	DF	ARG	Alexis Ferrero (from (Argentina) Colón de Santa Fe)
—	FW	ARG	Gonzalo Ludueña (from (Peru) Universidad San Martín, loan return)

Out:

No.	Pos.	Nation	Player
—	MF	PAR	Miguel Ángel Paniagua (to (Paraguay) Guaraní, end of loan)
—	DF	PAR	Javier Cohene (to (Paraguay) Sportivo Luqueño)
—	FW	ARG	Cristian Fabbiani (released)
—	MF	ARG	Nicolás Domingo (to (Argentina) Arsenal de Sarandí)
—		ARG	Diego Coria (to (Argentina) Ferro Carril Oeste)

=== Rosario Central ===
In:

No.	Pos.	Nation	Player
—	FW	ARG	Luciano Figueroa (from (Italy) Genoa)
—	GK	URU	Jorge Bava (from (Paraguay) Libertad)

Out:

No.	Pos.	Nation	Player
—	MF	ARG	Jesús Méndez (to (Argentina) Boca Juniors)
—	FW	URU	Gonzalo Choy González (to (Argentina) Tigre)
—	FW	ARG	Gonzalo Castillejos (to (Argentina) Lanús)
—	FW	ARG	Andrés Franzoia (to (Argentina) Huracán)
—	FW	ARG	Emanuel Herrera (to (Argentina) Sportivo Italiano)

=== San Lorenzo ===
In:

No.	Pos.	Nation	Player
—	FW	ARG	Maximiliano Ceratto (from (Argentina) Defensores de Belgrano)
—	MF	ARG	Sebastián Rusculleda (from (Saudi Arabia) Al-Ahli)
—	DF	ARG	Nelson Benítez (from (Portugal) Leixões, on loan from Porto)
—	FW	URU	Emiliano Alfaro (from (Uruguay) Liverpool)

Out:

No.	Pos.	Nation	Player
—	DF	ARG	Renato Civelli (to (France) Nice)
—	GK	ARG	Agustín Orión (to (Argentina) Estudiantes de La Plata)
—	MF	NGR	Felix Orode (to (Argentina) Nueva Chicago)
—	GK	ARG	Bruno Centeno (released)
—	FW	ARG	Víctor Meza (from (Argentina) Sportivo Italiano)
—	FW	ARG	Gonzalo Rovira (to (Chile) La Serena)

=== Tigre ===
In:

No.	Pos.	Nation	Player
—	MF	ARG	Rubén Botta (from (Latvia) FK Ventspils)
—	MF	URU	Gonzalo Choy González (from (Argentina) Rosario Central)
—	DF	ARG	Pablo Fontanello (from (Italy) Parma)
—	MF	ARG	Claudio Pérez (from (Chile) La Serena)
—	FW	URU	Brian Rodríguez (from (Uruguay) Peñarol)
—	MF	URU	Ribair Rodríguez (from (Uruguay) Danubio)

Out:

No.	Pos.	Nation	Player
—	FW	PAR	Julio Aguilar (to (Paraguay) Olimpia)
—	MF	PAR	José Montiel (to (Ecuador) Emelec)
—	DF	PAR	Julio Manzur (to (Paraguay) Olimpia)
—	MF	ARG	Matías Giménez (to (Argentina) Boca Juniors)
—	FW	ARG	Guillermo Suárez (to (Croatia) Dinamo Zagreb, end of loan)
—	DF	ARG	Agustín Cattáneo (to (Brazil) Figueirense)

=== Vélez Sársfield ===
In:

No.	Pos.	Nation	Player
—	FW	URU	Santiago Silva (from (Argentina) Banfield, loan return)

Out:

No.	Pos.	Nation	Player
—	FW	ARG	Andrés Guzmán (to (Argentina) Deportivo Merlo, on loan)
—	DF	ARG	Guillermo Pfund (to (Argentina) Deportivo Merlo, on loan)
—	DF	CHI	Waldo Ponce (to (Chile) Universidad Católica)
—	MF	ARG	Javier Robles (to (United States) San Jose Earthquakes)
—	FW	ARG	Maximiliano Timpanaro (to (Albania) Dinamo Tirana, on loan)
