= 2005–06 PSV Eindhoven season =

PSV Eindhoven
2005-06 season
- Head coach: (Netherlands) Guus Hiddink
- Stadium: Philips Stadion
- Eredivisie: 1st
- KNVB Cup: Runners-up
- Champions League: First knockout round
- Johan Cruyff Shield: Runners-up
- Top goalscorer: League: Jefferson Farfán (21); All: Jefferson Farfán (23)
Home colours	Away colours	Third colours

During the 2005–06 Dutch football season, PSV competed in the Eredivisie.

== Season summary ==
Despite the loss of several key players following their unexpected run to the UEFA Champions League semi-final, PSV secured a second successive Eredivise title. However, they were unable to defend the KNVB Cup, losing to Ajax in the final, and were knocked out in the Champions League first knockout round by Lyon.

At the end of the season, manager Guus Hiddink, who had concurrently managed the Australia national team, left to manage the Russia national team. He was succeeded as PSV manager by Ronald Koeman.

== Squad ==
Squad at end of season

Note: Flags indicate national team as defined under FIFA eligibility rules; some limited exceptions apply. Players may hold more than one non-FIFA nationality.

No.	Pos.	Nation	Player
1	GK	BRA	Heurelho Gomes
2	DF	NED	André Ooijer
3	DF	NED	Michael Reiziger
4	DF	BRA	Alex
5	DF	ENG	Michael Ball
6	MF	BEL	Timmy Simons
7	MF	FIN	Mika Väyrynen
8	MF	NED	Phillip Cocu
9	FW	NED	Jan Vennegoor of Hesselink
10	FW	CIV	Arouna Koné (on loan from Roda JC)
11	MF	USA	DaMarcus Beasley
15	MF	AUS	Jason Culina
16	DF	NED	Theo Lucius
17	FW	PER	Jefferson Farfán

No.	Pos.	Nation	Player
18	DF	GHA	Eric Addo
19	DF	NED	Michael Lamey
20	MF	NED	Ibrahim Afellay
21	GK	NED	Edwin Zoetebier
23	GK	AUS	Nathan Coe
24	MF	USA	Lee Nguyen
25	MF	NED	John de Jong
27	FW	AUS	Archie Thompson (on loan from Melbourne Victory)
30	DF	ESP	Pepe Pla
31	MF	ARG	Juan Carlos Carrizo
32	FW	NED	Roy Beerens
35	FW	NED	Gerald Sibon
37	MF	NED	Ismaïl Aissati

=== Left club during season ===
Note: Flags indicate national team as defined under FIFA eligibility rules; some limited exceptions apply. Players may hold more than one non-FIFA nationality.

No.	Pos.	Nation	Player
3	DF	KOR	Lee Young-pyo (to Tottenham Hotspur)
5	DF	NED	Wilfred Bouma (to Aston Villa)
14	MF	ARG	Osmar Ferreyra (on loan from CSKA Moscow)
22	MF	HUN	Csaba Fehér (on loan to Willem II)

No.	Pos.	Nation	Player
29	FW	BRA	Robert (on loan to Real Betis)
—	GK	NED	Jelle ten Rouwelaar (on loan to FC Eindhoven)
—	DF	AUS	Lindsay Wilson (on loan to Kilmarnock)

=== Starting 11 ===
Considering starts in all competitions

No.	Pos.	Nat.	Name	MS	Notes
1	GK	(Brazil)	Heurelho Gomes	40	
16	RB	(Netherlands)	Theo Lucius	22	
2	CB	(Netherlands)	André Ooijer	30	
4	CB	(Brazil)	Alex	35	
19	LB	(Netherlands)	Michael Lamey	29	
6	CM	(Belgium)	Timmy Simons	32	
20	CM	(Netherlands)	Ibrahim Afellay	26	
8	CM	(Netherlands)	Phillip Cocu	41	
11	RW	(United States)	DaMarcus Beasley	22	
9	CF	(Netherlands)	Jan Vennegoor of Hesselink	30	
17	LW	(Peru)	Jefferson Farfán	36	

== Transfers ==
=== In ===
- Lee Nguyen – Indiana Hoosiers
- Arouna Koné – Roda JC, loan
- Michael Ball – Rangers
- Archie Thompson – Melbourne Victory, loan
- Juan Carlos Carrizo – San Lorenzo
- Mika Väyrynen – Heerenveen

=== Out ===
- Leandro – Porto
- Remco van der Schaaf – Vitesse
- Johann Vogel – Milan
- Wilfred Bouma – Aston Villa
- Kasper Bøgelund
- Johan Vonlanthen
- Lee Young-pyo – Tottenham Hotspur
- Park Ji-sung - Manchester United
- Mark van Bommel – Barcelona, free
- Robert – Real Betis, loan
