= Gonzalo Díaz =

Gonzalo Díaz may refer to:

- Gonzalo Díaz (footballer, born 1990), Argentine midfielder
- Gonzalo Díaz (footballer, born 1996), Argentine midfielder
