= Jonathan Lopez =

Jonathan Lopez may refer to:

- Jonathan Lopez (French cyclist), French cyclo-cross cyclist
- Jonathan Lopez (singer), singer in the band C-Note
- Jonathan Lopez (writer), American writer and art historian
- Jonathan López (Argentine footballer) (born 1989), Argentine football forward
- Jonathan López (Guatemalan footballer) (born 1988), Guatemalan football midfielder
- Jonathan López (Spanish footballer) (born 1981), Spanish football goalkeeper
