= Desvaux =

Desvaux is a French surname. Notable people with the surname include:

- Étienne-Émile Desvaux (1830–1854), French botanist
- Héctor Desvaux (born 1980), Argentine footballer
- Nicaise Auguste Desvaux (1784–1856), French botanist
