= Matías García =

Matías García may refer to:

- Matías García (footballer, born 1980), Argentine football midfielder for Deportivo Maipú
- Matías García (footballer, born 1991), Argentine football midfielder for San Martín de Tucumán
- Matías García (footballer, born 1995), Argentine football midfielder for Unión de Santa Fe
- Matías García (footballer, born 1996), Maltese football defensive midfielder for Floriana
