= Gonzalo Choy =

Uruguayan footballer (born 1981)

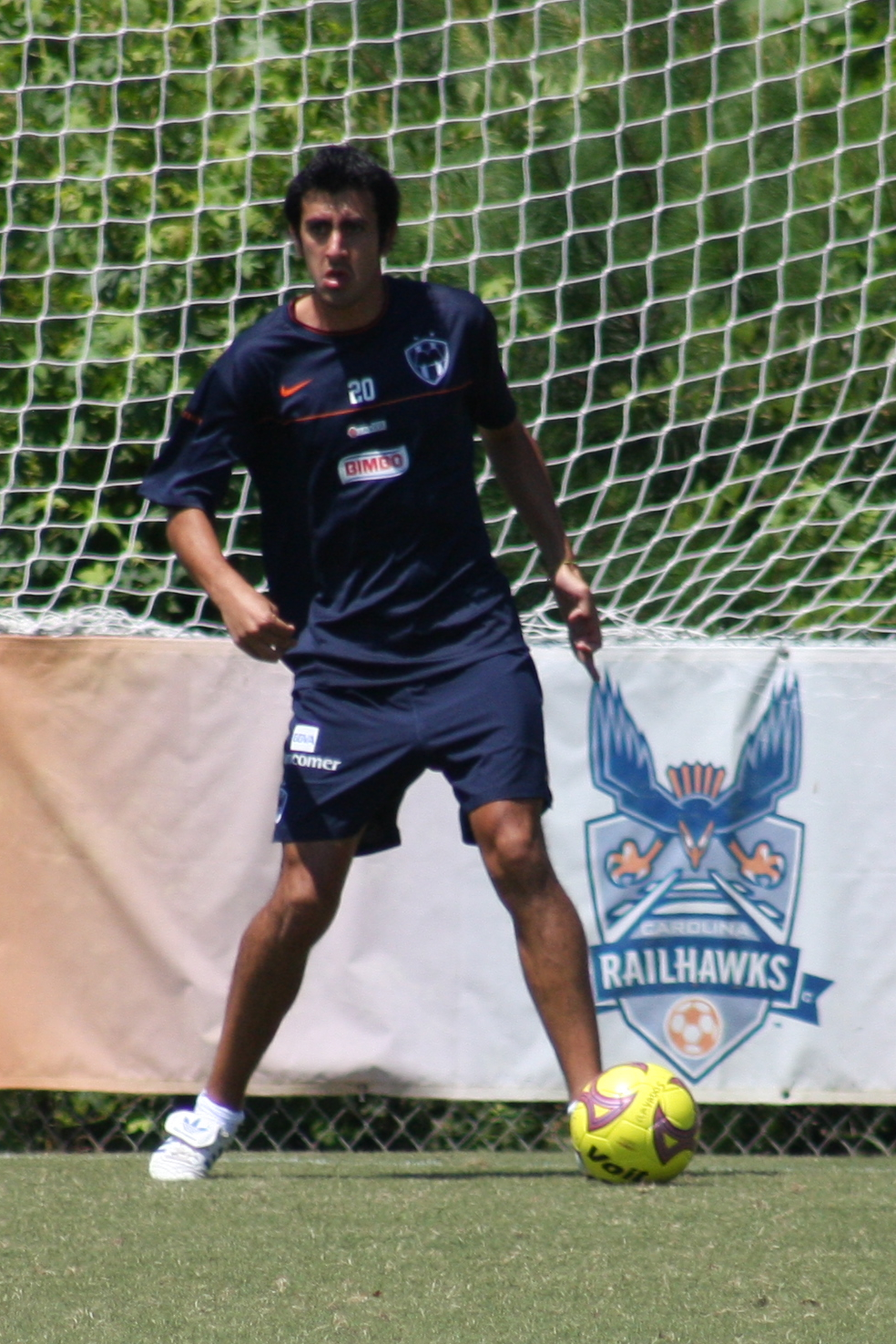

Personal information
- Full name: Gonzalo Gabriel Choy González
- Date of birth: November 11, 1981 (age 44)
- Place of birth: Montevideo, Uruguay
- Height: 1.89 m (6 ft 2 in)
- Positions: Winger; forward

Team information
- Current team: Cúcuta Deportivo

Senior career*
Years	Team	Apps	(Gls)
2000	Cerro	–	(–)
2001–2004	Gimnasia de La Plata	95	(17)
2005	Olimpo	16	(1)
2005–2006	Quilmes	33	(8)
2006–2007	Argentinos Juniors	28	(6)
2007–2008	Monarcas Morelia	30	(5)
2008	Monterrey	7	(0)
2009	Rosario Central	15	(0)
2010	Tigre	9	(0)
2010–2011	Arsenal de Sarandí	21	(1)
2011–2013	Gimnasia de La Plata	23	(5)
2013–	Cúcuta Deportivo		
- * Club domestic league appearances and goals as of 01:14, August 14, 2011 (UTC)

Gonzalo Gabriel Choy González (born November 11, 1981) is a Uruguayan football midfielder or striker who plays for Cúcuta Deportivo in the Categoría Primera A.

== Career ==
Choy began his career at C.A. Cerro in Montevideo, but soon made his way to Argentina. His first club in Argentina was Gimnasia y Esgrima La Plata. He stayed with Gimnasia for four years, then had short spells with Olimpo and Quilmes, before joining Argentinos Juniors in 2006.

On the 18th round of the 2006 Apertura tournament, Choy scored an equalizer against Estudiantes de La Plata. In the next match his former club, Gimnasia, presented him with a plaque, as they were certain that his goal would deny Estudiantes a chance of winning the championship. However, Boca Juniors lost two straight games and Estudiantes then won a playoff match to take the championship. Choy's effort proved fruitless. In January 2010 Tigre signed the former Rosario Central midfielder on a free transfer. His period at Tigre was short-lived as he joined Arsenal de Sarandí in July 2010.
