= Javier Velázquez =

Argentine footballer

Personal information
- Full name: Javier Rubén Velázquez
- Date of birth: 3 February 1984 (age 42)
- Place of birth: Zárate, Argentina
- Height: 1.87 m (6 ft 2 in)
- Position: Forward

Senior career*
Years	Team	Apps	(Gls)
2000–2005	Defensores Unidos		
2005–2006	Huracán CR		
2006–2009	Defensores Unidos		
2009	Racing Club		
2007–2008	Independiente Rivadavia		
2011–2012	→ Palestino (loan)		
2012–2014	Instituto de Córdoba		
2015–2016	Talleres de Córdoba		
2016	Juventud Unida		
2017–2019	Defensores Unidos		
2019–	Almirante Brown		
- * Club domestic league appearances and goals as of 26 March 2020

Javier Rubén Velázquez (born 3 February 1984) is an Argentine professional footballer who plays a forward for Almirante Brown.

== Honours ==
Talleres

- Torneo Federal A: 2015
