= Miguel Paniagua =

Paraguayan footballer (born 1987)

Personal information
- Full name: Miguel Ángel Paniagua Rivarola
- Date of birth: 14 May 1987 (age 39)
- Place of birth: Ciudad del Este, Paraguay
- Height: 1.80 m (5 ft 11 in)
- Position: Defensive midfielder

Team information
- Current team: Cusco
- Number: 16

Youth career
- 2002–2004: Club Deportivo Nacional

Senior career*
Years	Team	Apps	(Gls)
2005–2014	Guaraní	176	(10)
2009	→ River Plate (loan)	5	(0)
2012	→ Deportivo Cuenca (loan)	43	(2)
2014–2015	Cerro Porteño	34	(1)
2015–2016	Olimpia	28	(2)
2016–2017	Libertad	6	(0)
2017–2019	Nacional	107	(6)
2020–	Cusco	5	(1)

International career
2008	Paraguay U23	10	(2)
- * Club domestic league appearances and goals as of 22:29, 2 May 2020 (UTC)

Miguel Ángel Paniagua Rivarola (born 14 May 1987) is a Paraguayan football player who plays as a defensive midfielder for Cusco in Peru.

== Club career ==
Paniagua started playing professionally for Guaraní in the Primera División de Paraguay (Paraguayan First Division) in 2006. He became a regular starter for his club during the 2007 season and became the team's captain in the 2009 championship. Playing in the Copa Libertadores 2009 he scored a great goal against Boca Juniors in the Bombonera stadium. Also he scored a spectacular overhead bicycle kick against Libertad in 4-0 crushing victory

He was loaned to Argentine River Plate for the 2009–10 season. After failing the earn a regular place in the River Plate team Paniagua decided to return to his original club, Guarani.

He now plays for Club Olimpia in Paraguay.
