= Leonardo Morales (footballer, born 1987) =

Argentine footballer

Personal information
- Full name: Leonardo Marcelo Morales
- Date of birth: January 23, 1987 (age 39)
- Place of birth: Corrientes, Argentina
- Height: 1.73 m (5 ft 8 in)
- Position: Midfielder

Team information
- Current team: Villa San Carlos

Senior career*
Years	Team	Apps	(Gls)
2005–2006	Racing Club		
2006–2009	Estudiantes	3	(0)
2009	Arsenal de Sarandí		
2010	Universitario de Sucre	8	(0)
2010–2012	Atlético de Rafaela	4	(0)
2012	Alki Larnaca		
2012–2013	Textil Mandiyú	23	(2)
2013	Villa Mitre	10	(0)
2014	Villa San Carlos	36	(2)
2015	Platense	32	(0)
2016–	Villa San Carlos	68	(1)

International career
2007	Argentina U20	2	(0)
- * Club domestic league appearances and goals as of 14:17, 22 April 2018 (UTC)

Leonardo Marcelo Morales (born 23 January 1987) is an Argentine professional footballer who plays as a midfielder for Primera B Metropolitana side Villa San Carlos.

== Career ==
Morales made his professional debut for Estudiantes on 7 October 2006 in a 3–0 away win against Lanús. He then went on to play for Arsenal de Sarandí, though he did not participate in any first team game during his one-year stay.

In 2007, he played two games for the Argentina under-20 team during the South American Youth Championship.
