= Julio Aguilar =

Paraguayan footballer (born 1986)

Personal information
- Full name: Julio Ramón Aguilar Franco
- Date of birth: 1 July 1986 (age 40)
- Place of birth: La Pastora, Paraguay
- Height: 1.85 m (6 ft 1 in)
- Position: Striker

Youth career
- Liga Yhu
- Liga Caaguazeña
- Liga Aregueña

Senior career*
Years	Team	Apps	(Gls)
2007	Atlético Mexiquense	2	(0)
2007	Fernando de la Mora	17	(0)
2008	12 de Octubre	19	(13)
2008–2009	Tigres UANL	16	(2)
2009	Tigre	0	(0)
2010	Olimpia Asunción	12	(3)
2010	Rubio Ñú	9	(0)
2011	Independiente FBC	29	(9)
2012	Paços Ferreira	0	(0)
2013	Sol de América	34	(6)
2014	Municipal	8	(0)
2014	3 de Febrero	3	(0)
2015	Deportivo Capiatá	6	(2)
2015	Técnico Universitario	12	(1)
2016–2017	General Díaz	53	(17)
2017	Boca Unidos	1	(0)
2018	Guaireña	6	(0)
2018	Martín Ledesma		
2021	Atyrá		

International career
2008	Paraguay	1	(0)
- * Club domestic league appearances and goals as of 17:45, 17 August 2022 (UTC)

Julio Ramón Aguilar Franco (born 1 July 1986) is a Paraguayan footballer. He is a striker.

== Career ==
Aguilar finished as the second highest scorer of the Paraguayan Apertura 2008 tournament scoring 12 goals.

Before joining Tigres de la UANL from Mexico, he played for Fernando de la Mora and 12 de Octubre in Paraguay.
