= Diego Trotta =

Argentine footballer

Personal information
- Full name: Diego Alberto Trotta
- Date of birth: 13 December 1978 (age 47)
- Place of birth: Médanos, Argentina
- Position: Defender

Team information
- Current team: Independiente Neuquén

Senior career*
Years	Team	Apps	(Gls)
1995–2002	Villa Mitre		
1999	→ Atlético Mexiquense (loan)		
2000–2001	→ Salgueiros (loan)	3	(0)
2002	Huracán de Tres Arroyos		
2002–2003	Las Palmas	18	(1)
2003–2004	Alavés	23	(2)
2004–2008	Elche	99	(4)
2004–2005	→ Olimpo (loan)	13	(0)
2008–2009	Albacete	28	(0)
2009	Godoy Cruz	1	(0)
2009–2010	Atlético Tucumán	9	(0)
2010–2011	San Martín		
2011–2013	Villa Mitre		
2013–2014	Bella Vista		
2014–	Independiente Neuquén	19	(1)
- * Club domestic league appearances and goals as of 25 May 2015

Diego Alberto Trotta (born 13 December 1978) is an Argentine professional footballer who plays for Independiente Neuquén, as a defender.

== Career ==
Born in Médanos, Buenos Aires, Trotta has played for Villa Mitre, Atlético Mexiquense, Salgueiros, Huracán de Tres Arroyos, Las Palmas, Alavés, Elche, Olimpo, Albacete, Godoy Cruz, Atlético Tucumán, San Martín and Bella Vista.

Trotta holds an Italian passport and played seven seasons in Spain's Segunda División as a central defender. He joined Alavés in the summer of 2003, and scored his first goal for the club against Sporting on 7 September 2003, two days after the birth of his daughter.

== Arrest ==
On 16 April 2014, Trotta was captured on a security camera during a physical altercation with his former partner outside of her workplace in Bahía Blanca and was arrested.
