= Mauro Dobler =

Argentinian footballer (born 1983)

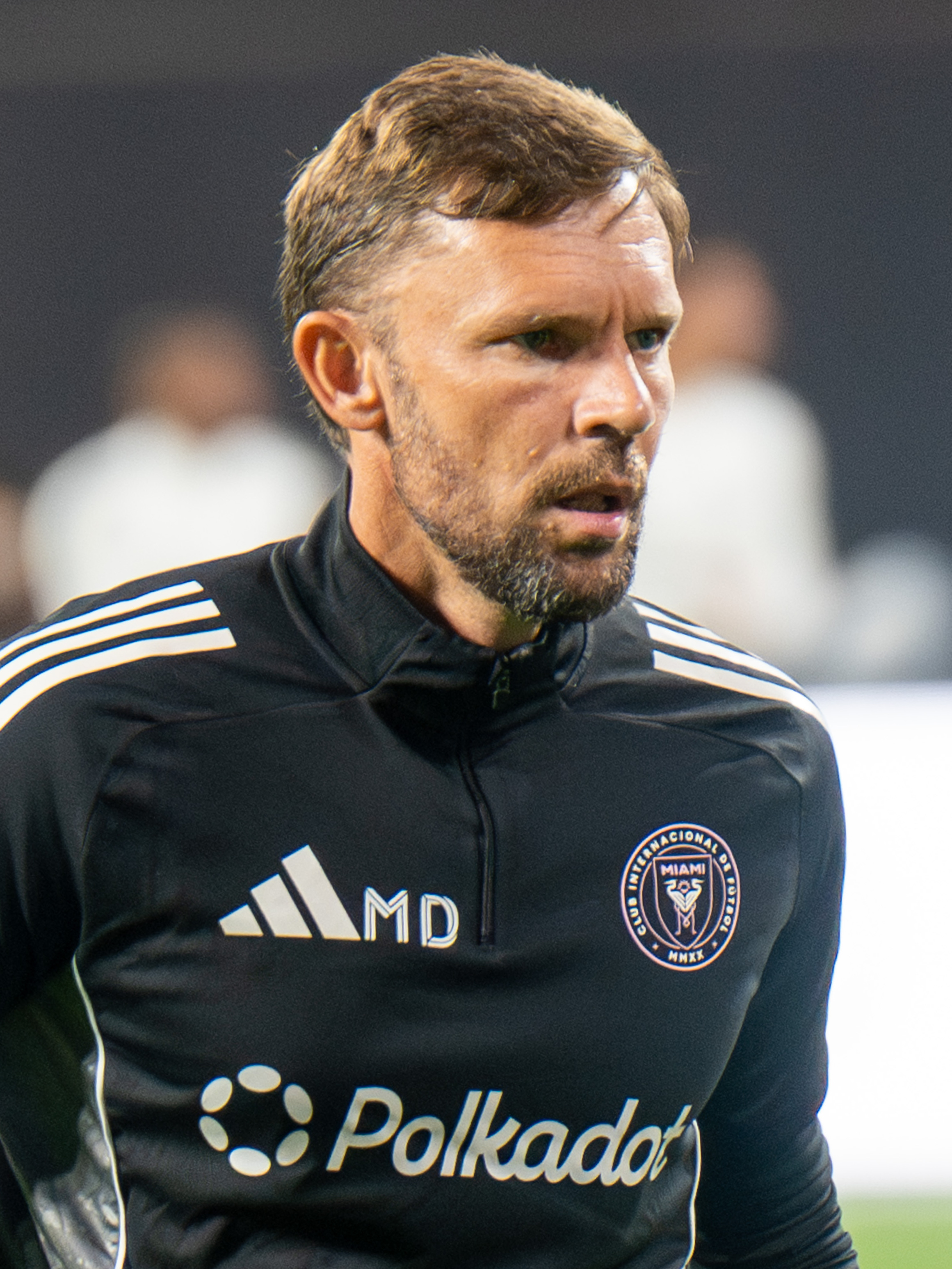
Mauro Dobler with Inter Miami in 2025

Mauro Javier Dobler (born 3 January 1983) is an Argentine former footballer who played as a goalkeeper. After retiring from playing, he became a goalkeeping coach.

== Playing career ==
Born in Gualeguaychú in the province of Entre Ríos, Dobler began playing at local Central Entrerriano as a midfielder. He then moved into defence and finally to goalkeeper, when his team's first-choice player in that position was barred from playing due to his poor schoolwork. He was then scouted for Estudiantes de La Plata by Eduardo Flores.

Dobler made the senior squad at Estudiantes in 2004, but did not make his professional debut until being loaned to Atlanta in the Primera B Metropolitana in 2005. As third-choice goalkeeper, he was part of the Estudiantes sides that won the Apertura in 2006 and the Copa Libertadores in 2009.

In 2006, Dobler transferred to Racing Club, where he was again backup, and made headlines for a training-ground fight with teammate Teófilo Gutiérrez. After three years with the club from Avellaneda, he spent the rest of his career in the lower leagues. He was loaned to Almirante Brown, then joined Tiro Federal and Santamarina before ending his career in a second spell at Atlanta.

== Coaching career ==
Dobler began as a goalkeeping coach in the lower ranks of Racing, before in late 2018 being hired by the Argentine Football Association. He worked with the women's team at the 2019 World Cup. He was goalkeeping coach on the senior men's team that won the 2021 Copa América. Dobler coached Emiliano Martínez, who won the 2022 FIFA World Cup with Argentina.

For 2025, Dobler left the AFA and moved with under-20 head coach Javier Mascherano to Inter Miami CF in Major League Soccer.
