= Gonzalo Díaz (footballer, born 1996) =

Argentine footballer

Personal information
- Date of birth: 15 June 1996 (age 30)
- Place of birth: Buenos Aires, Argentina
- Height: 1.68 m (5 ft 6 in)
- Position: Midfielder

Youth career
- Los Andes

Senior career*
Years	Team	Apps	(Gls)
2017–2019	Los Andes	3	(0)
- * Club domestic league appearances and goals as of 23:31, 14 February 2019 (UTC)

Gonzalo Díaz (born 15 June 1996) is an Argentine professional footballer who plays as a midfielder.

== Career ==
Díaz began his senior career with Los Andes. He was an unused substitute for a Primera B Nacional fixture with Estudiantes on 26 November 2017, before appearing for his very professional debut on 10 December versus Nueva Chicago as they drew 2–2 at the Estadio Eduardo Gallardón. Further appearances followed in the 2017–18 season against San Martín and Instituto.

== Career statistics ==
As of 14 February 2019.

Appearances and goals by club, season and competition
Club	Season	League			Cup		Continental		Other		Total	
Club	Season	Division	Apps	Goals	Apps	Goals	Apps	Goals	Apps	Goals	Apps	Goals
Los Andes	2017–18	Primera B Nacional	3	0	0	0	—		0	0	3	0
Los Andes	2018–19	Primera B Nacional	0	0	0	0	—		0	0	0	0
Career total			3	0	0	0	—		0	0	3	0
