= Carlos Santibáñez =

Argentine footballer

Personal information
- Full name: Carlos Alberto Santibáñez
- Date of birth: 30 August 1986 (age 40)
- Place of birth: San Isidro, Argentina
- Height: 1.69 m (5 ft 6 1/2 in)
- Position: Attacking midfielder

Youth career
- Argentinos Juniors

Senior career*
Years	Team	Apps	(Gls)
2004–2010	Argentinos Juniors	18	(0)
2010	→ Santiago Morning (loan)	10	(0)
2011–2012	Defensores de Belgrano	22	(0)
2012–2013	JJ Urquiza	18	(2)
2013–2014	Mushuc Runa	31	(2)
2015	Gualaceo	7	(0)
2015	Cobreloa	12	(0)
Total		118	(4)
- * Club domestic league appearances and goals

Carlos Alberto Santibáñez (born 30 August 1986 in San Isidro) is a former Argentine football midfielder.

== Career ==
Besides Argentina, Santibáñez played in Chile and Ecuador.

In Chile, he played for Santiago Morning in the top division and Cobreloa in the second level.
