= Gonzalo García (footballer, born 1987) =

Argentine footballer

Personal information
- Full name: Gonzalo Sebastián García
- Date of birth: February 6, 1987 (age 39)
- Place of birth: Buenos Aires, Argentina
- Height: 1.70 m (5 ft 7 in)
- Position: Left-back

Youth career
- 2005–2007: Racing Club

Senior career*
Years	Team	Apps	(Gls)
2007–2012	Racing Club	42	(0)
2009–2010	→ Huracán (loan)	21	(0)
2012–2014	Olimpo	17	(0)
2014–2015	Platense	6	(1)
2015	Almirante Brown	28	(1)
2016–2017	Nueva Chicago	12	(0)
2017	Defensores de Belgrano	10	(0)
2017–2018	Atletico Vieste		
2018	Racing Ferrol	7	(0)
2018–2020	All Boys	25	(0)
2020–2021	San Miguel	30	(0)

International career
2007	Argentina U-20	8	(0)
- * Club domestic league appearances and goals as of 14:24, 6 June 2022 (UTC)

Gonzalo Sebastián García (born 6 February 1987 in Buenos Aires) is an Argentine footballer, who plays as a left-back.

== Career ==
García made his professional debut for Racing Club in 2005. In 2007 García was part of the Argentina U-20 team that played in the 2007 South American Youth Championship. Argentina finished 2nd, which qualified them for the 2007 FIFA U-20 World Cup. Argentina eventually went on to win the FIFA U-20 World Cup, but García was not included in the winning squad.
