= Germán Basualdo =

Argentine footballer (born 1984)

Personal information
- Full name: Germán Rodrigo Basualdo
- Date of birth: March 7, 1984 (age 42)
- Place of birth: Buenos Aires, Argentina
- Height: 1.67 m (5 ft 6 in)
- Position: Defensive midfielder

Team information
- Current team: Deportivo Laferrere

Senior career*
| Years | Team | Apps | (Gls) |
| 2002–2005 | Nueva Chicago | 81 | (6) |
| 2005–2006 | Tiro Federal | 32 | (1) |
| 2006–2007 | Gimnasia de La Plata | 27 | (0) |
| 2007–2008 | Almirante Brown | 9 | (2) |
| 2008 | Pontevedra CF | 7 | (0) |
| 2009 | Chacarita Juniors | 7 | (0) |
| 2009–2012 | Argentinos Juniors | 56 | (1) |
| 2012–2013 | Gimnasia de La Plata | 16 | (0) |
| 2013–2014 | Almirante Brown | 31 | (0) |
| 2014–2015 | Argentinos Juniors | 14 | (0) |
| 2016–2018 | Los Andes | 16 | (0) |
| 2018– | Deportivo Laferrere | | |
- * Club domestic league appearances and goals as of 20:28, 23 September 2019 (UTC)

Germán Rodrigo Basualdo (born 7 March 1984) is an Argentine football midfielder who plays for Deportivo Laferrere.

== Career ==
Basualdo began his professional playing career in 2002 with Nueva Chicago making his league debut on 5 July 2003 in a 0–3 home defeat to Banfield. In 2004Nueva Chicago were relegated to the Argentine 2nd division, he remained with the club for another two seasons playing in the 2nd tier.

In 2006, he joined newly promoted Primera División debutants Tiro Federal where he was a regular first team player, but he could not help them to avoid relegation at the end of the season.

After a season with Gimnasia de La Plata between 2006 and 2007 he joined Almirante Brown of the 2nd división to help them battle against their mammoth 30 point deduction for crowd violence the previous season. Again Basualdo was a player in a relegated team but his performances were good enough to earn him a move to Spanish side Pontevedra CF in 2008.

In 2009, he joined Chacarita Juniors and helped them to secure promotion to the Primera División.

Later in 2009 he was signed by new Argentinos Juniors manager Claudio Borghi. He did not make many first team appearances in the Apertura, but in the Clausura 2010 championship he featured in almost half of the games, helping the club to secure their first Primera División title since 1985.

== Titles ==
Argentinos Juniors

- Argentine Primera División (1): Clausura 2010
