= Pepe Pla =

Spanish footballer

Personal information
- Full name: José Pla Mollà
- Date of birth: 25 January 1985 (age 41)
- Place of birth: Valencia, Spain
- Height: 1.82 m (6 ft 0 in)
- Position: Left-back

Team information
- Current team: CD FB L'Eliana (women) (manager)

Youth career
- 2003–2005: Valencia
- 2005–2007: PSV Eindhoven

Senior career*
Years	Team	Apps	(Gls)
2007	PSV Eindhoven	0	(0)
2007	→ Levante B (loan)	16	(4)
2007–2008	Levante B	25	(7)
2008	Levante	0	(0)
2008–2009	Gavà	5	(0)
2009–2010	Puçol	13	(0)
2010	Estepona	9	(0)
2010–2011	La Muela	13	(0)
2011	Ilioupoli	3	(0)
2011–2012	Huracán Valencia	16	(0)
2012–2013	Alzira	10	(1)
2013–2014	Discóbolo La Torre	15	(0)
2013–2015	Pego	18	(0)
2015–2016	Discóbolo La Torre	34	(5)
2016–2017	Alboraya		
Total		177	(17)

International career
2004	Spain U17	4	(0)

Managerial career
- 2017–2025: Discóbolo La Torre (women)
- 2025–: CD FB L'Eliana (women)
- * Club domestic league appearances and goals

José "Pepe" Pla Mollà (born 25 January 1987) is a Spanish retired footballer who played as a left-back, and the current manager of Discóbolo La Torre AC's women's team.
