= Diego García (footballer, born 1986) =

Argentine footballer

Personal information
- Full name: Diego alejandro García
- Date of birth: 21 June 1986 (age 40)
- Place of birth: La Paz, Entre Ríos, Argentina
- Height: 1.78 m (5 ft 10 in)
- Position: Midfielder

Team information
- Current team: Defensores de Belgrano

Youth career
- Quilmes

Senior career*
Years	Team	Apps	(Gls)
2007–2009	Quilmes	52	(2)
2009	Argentinos Juniors	0	(0)
2010	Independiente Rivadavia	18	(2)
2011	Defensa y Justicia	17	(0)
2011–2013	San Martín SJ	44	(5)
2014	Unión Santa Fe	17	(1)
2014	Atlético Tucumán	15	(2)
2015	Curicó Unido	15	(3)
2015	Sportivo Belgrano	18	(3)
2016	Central Córdoba SdE	18	(1)
2016–2017	Atlanta	32	(2)
2017–2026	Almirante Brown	209	(30)
2022	→ Belgrano (loan)	14	(0)
2024	→ Racing de Córdoba (loan)	19	(2)
2026–	Defensores de Belgrano	3	(0)
- * Club domestic league appearances and goals as of 17:54, 25 April 2026 (UTC)

Diego Alejandro García (born June 21, 1986, in La Paz (Entre Ríos), Argentina) is an Argentine footballer who plays as a midfielder for Defensores de Belgrano.

== Teams ==
- (Argentina) Quilmes 2007–2009
- (Argentina) Argentinos Juniors 2009
- (Argentina) Independiente Rivadavia 2010
- (Argentina) Defensa y Justicia 2011
- (Argentina) San Martín de San Juan 2011–2013
- (Argentina) Unión Santa Fe 2014
- (Argentina) Atlético Tucumán 2014
- (Chile) Curicó Unido 2015
- (Argentina) Sportivo Belgrano 2015
- (Argentina) Central Córdoba de Santiago del Estero 2016
- (Argentina) Atlanta 2016–2017
- (Argentina) Almirante Brown 2017–2022
- (Argentina) Belgrano 2022
- (Argentina) Almirante Brown 2023
- (Argentina) Racing de Córdoba 2024
- (Argentina) Almirante Brown 2024–2026
- (Argentina) Defensores de Belgrano 2026–

== Personal life ==
His younger brother, Facundo, is a football forward from the Almirante Brown youth system.

García is nicknamed Gurí.
