= Diego Chitzoff =

Argentine football right back

Personal information
- Full name: Diego Martín Chitzoff
- Date of birth: April 4, 1980 (age 46)
- Place of birth: Gobernador Galvez, Argentina
- Height: 1.79 m (5 ft 10 in)
- Position: Right back

Team information
- Current team: Tiro Federal

Senior career*
Years	Team	Apps	(Gls)
2002–2004	Tiro Federal	54	(5)
2004–2009	Colón	116	(1)
2009–2011	Rosario Central	51	(2)
2011–2012	Gimnasia de Jujuy	30	(0)
2012–2015	Talleres	21	(1)
2015	Tiro Federal	5	(0)
- * Club domestic league appearances and goals as of 23 May 2010

Diego Chitzoff (born 4 April 1980 in Gobernador Galvez, Santa Fe) is an Argentine football right back currently playing for Tiro Federal.

Chitzoff started his career in 2002 playing for Tiro Federal in the Argentine 3rd division. In 2003 the club won the Clausura tournament and promotion to Primera B Nacional.

Chitzoff signed for Colón in 2004 and went on to make over 100 appearances for the club. On 24 July 2009 he signed for Rosario Central, the club he is fan of.

== Career statistics ==
Season	Club	División	Apps	Goals
2002/2003	Tiro Federal	Tercera División	17	0
2003/2004	Tiro Federal	Segunda División	37	5
2004/2005	Club Atlético Colón	Primera División	24	0
2005/2006	Club Atlético Colón	Primera División	28	0
2006/2007	Club Atlético Colón	Primera División	25	0
2007/2008	Club Atlético Colón	Primera División	17	1
2008/2009	Club Atlético Colón	Primera División	22	0
2009/200-	Club Atlético Rosario Central	Primera División	37	2

== Titles ==
Season	Team	Title
Clausura 2003	Tiro Federal	Torneo Argentino A
2012/2013	Talleres de Córdoba	Torneo Argentino A
