= Augusto Mainguyague =

Argentine footballer

Personal information
- Full name: Augusto Mainguyague
- Date of birth: September 10, 1985 (age 41)
- Place of birth: Laboulaye, Argentina
- Height: 1.78 m (5 ft 10 in)
- Position: Defender

Team information
- Current team: Newell's Old Boys

Youth career
- 1995–2006: Newell's Old Boys

Senior career*
Years	Team	Apps	(Gls)
2006–2008	Newell's Old Boys	15	(0)
2008–2009	→ Bolívar (loan)	25	(1)
2009–2010	Instituto	17	(1)
2010–2011	Independiente Rivadavia	5	(0)
2012–	Central Córdoba de Santiago del Estero		
- * Club domestic league appearances and goals as of 22:02, 23 September 2010 (UTC)

Augusto Mainguyague (born September 10, 1985) is an Argentine football defender who plays for Central Córdoba de Santiago del Estero.

== Career ==
Mainguyague joined Newell's when he was 14 years old, and worked his way up to the first team. He made his flight top debut on February 25, 2007, in a loss to Lanús.

In 2008, he was transferred on loan to Club Bolívar from the Liga de Fútbol Profesional Boliviano. Playing for Bolívar, Mainguyague won the pre-season Aerosur Cup, as well as the 2009 Apertura tournament.

In January 2010 he joined Instituto of the Argentine 2nd division.

In 2012 arrived to Central Córdoba de Santiago del Estero of the Argentine 3rd division.

== Club titles ==
Season	Club	Title
2009 (A)	Bolívar	Liga de Fútbol Profesional Boliviano
