= Sebastián Salomón =

Argentine footballer

Personal information
- Date of birth: 12 December 1978 (age 47)
- Place of birth: General Roca, Argentina
- Height: 1.78 m (5 ft 10 in)
- Position: Midfielder

Team information
- Current team: Lanús (youth manager)

Senior career*
Years	Team	Apps	(Gls)
1999–2001	Los Andes	64	(1)
2001	Almagro	20	(0)
2002–2009	Lanús	172	(6)
2005	→ Olimpia (loan)	21	(0)
2009	Godoy Cruz	12	(0)
2010	Aris Limassol	12	(0)
2010	Rampla Juniors	4	(0)

Managerial career
- 2012–2021: Lanús (youth)
- 2021–2022: Los Andes
- 2022–: Lanús (youth)
- 2023: Lanús (interim)
- * Club domestic league appearances and goals

Sebastián Salomón (born 12 December 1978) is an Argentine football manager and former player who played as a midfielder. He is the current manager of Lanús' youth categories.

== Playing career ==
Salomón began his professional playing career in 2000 with Los Andes, he made his debut in a 2–1 away win over Racing Club on 6 August 2000. After Los Andes were relegated he had a short stint with Club Almagro before joining Lanús in 2002 where he played until 2009, where he played 197 games for the club scoring 6 goals.

In 2005 Salomón had a short loan spell with Paraguayan side Olimpia. He was part of the Lanús squad that won the Apertura 2007 tournament, which was the club's first league championship.

In 2009, he joined Godoy Cruz. In 2010, he joined Aris Limassol and in the summer of 2010 the team released him. He played in Uruguay with Rampla Juniors and subsequently retired.

== Honours ==
Lanús

- Argentine Primera División: 2007 Apertura
