= Franco Peppino =

Argentine footballer

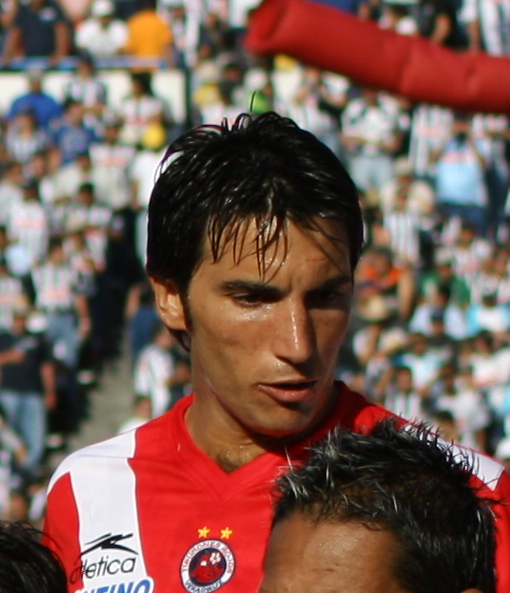

Personal information
- Full name: Franco Peppino
- Date of birth: 16 June 1982 (age 44)
- Place of birth: Córdoba, Argentina
- Height: 1.79 m (5 ft 10 in)
- Position: Centre-back

Team information
- Current team: Belgrano (assistant)

Youth career
- Belgrano

Senior career*
Years	Team	Apps	(Gls)
2000–2007	Belgrano	159	(5)
2007–2008	Veracruz	32	(0)
2008–2009	Racing Club	19	(1)
2009–2010	Arsenal de Sarandí	22	(0)
2010–2014	Rosario Central	70	(0)
2014–2015	Barcelona SC	24	(0)
2015–2016	Sarmiento	40	(1)
2016–2017	Gimnasia de Jujuy	23	(1)
2018–2021	Los Andes	45	(0)

Managerial career
- 2021–: Belgrano (assistant)
- * Club domestic league appearances and goals

Franco Peppino (born 16 June 1982 in Córdoba) is a retired Argentine footballer, who primarily played as a centre-back. He is currently the assistant manager of Belgrano.

== Club career ==
Peppino began his playing career in 2000 with Belgrano de Córdoba, he made his league debut on 16 December 2000 in a 1–4 home defeat to Rosario Central. He went on to make 160 league appearances for the Córdoba club before leaving to join Mexican side CD Veracruz in 2007.

In 2008 Peppino returned to Argentina to play for Racing Club and in 2009 he joined Arsenal de Sarandí.

== Later career ==
Peppino retired from football at the end of 2020. In May 2021, Peppino appointed assistant coach of newly hired manager Guillermo Farré at Belgrano.
