= Carlos Valencia (footballer, born 1989) =

Colombian footballer

Personal information
- Full name: Carlos Alberto Valencia Paredes
- Date of birth: 28 April 1989 (age 37)
- Place of birth: Florida, Valle del Cauca, Colombia
- Height: 1.77 m (5 ft 9 1/2 in)
- Position: Left-back

Team information
- Current team: Independiente Medellín

Youth career
- 2006–2007: River Plate

Senior career*
Years	Team	Apps	(Gls)
2007	River Plate	2	(0)
2008	Dijon FCO	2	(0)
2008–2009	Estudiantes de La Plata	1	(1)
2009	Godoy Cruz	6	(0)
2010	Rubin Kazan	0	(0)
2010	→ Sportivo Luqueño (loan)	16	(1)
2010	Portimonense S.C.	0	(0)
2011	Deportivo Cali	2	(0)
2012	Atlético Huila	2	(0)
2012–2013	Chacarita Juniors	1	(0)
2013–2014	Deportes Copiapó	29	(3)
2014–2016	Independiente Medellín	41	(1)
2016	Millonarios	0	(0)
2016–2017	Chiapas	2	(0)
2017	Atlético Bucaramanga	4	(0)
2017–	Independiente Medellín	0	(0)
- * Club domestic league appearances and goals as of 9 July 2017 (UTC)

Carlos Alberto Valencia Paredes (born 28 April 1989) is a Colombian footballer who plays as a left-back for Independiente Medellín.

== Career ==
Valencia was born in Santa Marta, Colombia. He left Colombia at the age of 15 to go and play in the River Plate youth academy. He was formed for Club Deportivo Independiente San Joaquin. His coach was José Luis Cruz (Tucumano) He initially played as an attacking midfielder, but at the age of 17 when he joined the River 1st team he was used as a left-back, and to take corners and throw ins.

He made his debut on 10 November 2007 in River's 2–1 loss to Huracán and played the full 90 minutes in his debut.

After starting two games at the end of the season for River Plate, several French clubs became interested and he eventually joined Dijon FCO.

In 2009, he returned to Argentina to play for Estudiantes de La Plata. On 17 May 2009 he came on as a substitute against Independiente in the 77th minute and then scored his first goal for the club to finish off a 5–1 win. On 11 August 2009, Valencia was signed by Godoy Cruz and on 22 December 2009 his club released the Colombian left-back. In the summer of 2010 he signed to the Portuguese Liga club Portimonense, but he was loaned to Sportivo Luqueño.
