= Mauricio Verón =

Argentine footballer

Personal information
- Full name: Mauricio Rodrigo Verón
- Date of birth: 3 July 1977 (age 49)
- Place of birth: Granadero Baigorria, Santa Fe Province, Argentina
- Positions: Midfielder; defender

Team information
- Current team: Concepción FC

Youth career
- –1997: Argentino de Rosario

Senior career*
Years	Team	Apps	(Gls)
1998–1999	Argentino de Rosario	33	(3)
2000–2001	Belgrano	24	(0)
2001–2002	Ulsan Hyundai		
2002–2003	Quilmes	9	(1)
2003	Argentino de Rosario	9	(0)
2004	Tigre	10	(0)
2005	Argentino de Rosario	11	(3)
2005–2006	Central Córdoba	24	(1)
2006–2007	Independiente de La Rioja		
2007–2009	Atlético Tucumán	22	(1)
2009–2010	Racing de Córdoba		
2010–2011	9 de Julio		
2011	Sportivo Las Parejas		
2011–2013	Sarmiento La Banda		
2013–2015	CA Regina		
2015–	Concepción FC	7	(1)
- * Club domestic league appearances and goals as of 26 May 2015

Mauricio Rodrigo Verón (born 3 July 1977) is an Argentine footballer who plays for Concepción FC in Argentina.

== Career ==
Verón started his senior career with Argentino de Rosario in 1998. In 2000, he moved to Córdoba-based Club Atlético Belgrano, where he spent the 2000–2001 season, his sole one in Primera División. He then signed for South Korean top flight team Ulsan Hyundai.

In the course of his career, Verón accumulated more than 166 caps for multiple clubs of various levels of Argentine football league system, scoring no less than 11 goals in process.

Due to injuries, he only participated in four Atlético Tucumán's matches in the 2008–2009 season.

== Honours ==
Argentino de Rosario

- Primera B Metropolitana: Apertura 1998
- Primera B Metropolitana: Clausura 1999

Tigre

- Primera B Metropolitana: Apertura 2004

Atlético Tucumán

- Torneo Argentino A : 2007–08
- Primera B Nacional : 2008–09

== Personal life ==
Verón was born in Granadero Baigorria, a city near Rosario, on the western shore of the Paraná River. He likes fishing since his childhood.
