= Carlos Fondacaro =

Argentine footballer

Personal information
- Full name: Carlos Rubén Fondacaro
- Date of birth: 21 May 1987 (age 39)
- Place of birth: Rosario, Argentina
- Height: 1.65 m (5 ft 5 in)
- Positions: Defender; midfielder

Team information
- Current team: Tiro Federal

Youth career
- Boca Juniors

Senior career*
Years	Team	Apps	(Gls)
2008–2009	Boca Juniors	?	(?)
2009–2010	→ Tigre (loan)	?	(?)
2010–2012	→ Tucumán (loan)	?	(?)
2012–2013	→ Patronato (loan)	?	(?)
2013	Iraklis Psachna FC	4	(0)
2014–2015	FF Jaro	28	(3)
2015–	Tiro Federal	3	(1)
- * Club domestic league appearances and goals as of 14 April 2015

Carlos Fondacaro (born 21 May 1987) is an Argentine footballer who is currently playing for Tiro Federal in the Torneo Argentino A.

== Career ==
Fonadacaro has played in the Argentine Primera División for Boca Juniors and Club Atlético Tigre.
