= Juan Carlos Carrizo =

Argentine footballer (born 1987)

Personal information
- Full name: Juan Carlos Carrizo
- Date of birth: June 3, 1987 (age 39)
- Place of birth: San Miguel de Tucumán, Argentina
- Height: 1.79 m (5 ft 10 in)
- Position: Midfielder

Youth career
- San Lorenzo

Senior career*
Years	Team	Apps	(Gls)
2005–2008	PSV	0	(0)
2006–2007	→ Elche (loan)	0	(0)
2007–2008	→ Olimpo (loan)	8	(0)
2008–2012	Argentinos Juniors	3	(0)
2009–2010	→ Huracán (loan)	3	(0)
2012–2013	San Jorge	0	(0)
2013–2015	San Lorenzo de Alem	29	(4)
2014	→ Bella Vista (loan)	14	(4)
2015–2017	Juventud Antoniana	3	(0)
2017–2018	Unión San Felipe	4	(0)
- * Club domestic league appearances and goals

Juan Carlos Carrizo (born 3 June 1987) is an Argentine footballer who plays as a midfielder.

== Club career ==
Carrizo started his football career in the youth divisions of San Lorenzo. He moved to PSV Eindhoven in 2005 but has not made a first-team appearance. Next season Carrizo was loaned to Elche CF. In 2007, he was loaned again to Olimpo. PSV released him in the summer of 2008.

In 2009, he joined Club Atlético Huracán. He has since played for numerous lower league sides in Argentina, as well as Unión San Felipe in Chile.
