= Jonathan López (Argentine footballer) =

Argentine footballer

Personal information
- Full name: Jonathan Yamil López
- Date of birth: January 19, 1989 (age 37)
- Place of birth: Chajari, Entre Ríos, Argentina
- Height: 1.75 m (5 ft 9 in)
- Position: Second striker

Team information
- Current team: All Boys

Senior career*
Years	Team	Apps	(Gls)
2006–2009	Atlético de Rafaela	71	(15)
2009–2010	→ Arsenal de Sarandí (loan)	10	(0)
2010–2011	→ Peñarol (loan)	2	(0)
2012	→ Defensa y Justicia (loan)	9	(1)
2013–2014	→ Patronato	21	(0)
2014–	All Boys	19	(4)
- * Club domestic league appearances and goals as of 26 April 2015

Jonathan Yamil López (born 19 January 1989) is an Argentine football forward. He currently plays for All Boys of the Primera B Nacional in Argentine.

== Career ==
López began playing professional football in 2006 with Primera B Nacional (Argentine second division) club Atlético de Rafaela. At the end of the 2008–09 season Rafaela qualified to the promotion playoff against Gimnasia y Esgrima La Plata. After a 3–3 draw and failure to gain promotion, López joined Primera División side Arsenal de Sarandí on a one-year loan. In 2010, he joined Peñarol in Uruguay, again on loan. In 2011, López returned to Atlético de Rafaela to play in Primera B Nacional, helping the team obtain promotion. In 2012, López signed a loan for six months to play in Defensa y Justicia, due to the lack of participation in the current league.

== Honours ==
Atlético de Rafaela

- Primera B Nacional (1): 2010–11
