= Héctor Desvaux =

Argentine footballer

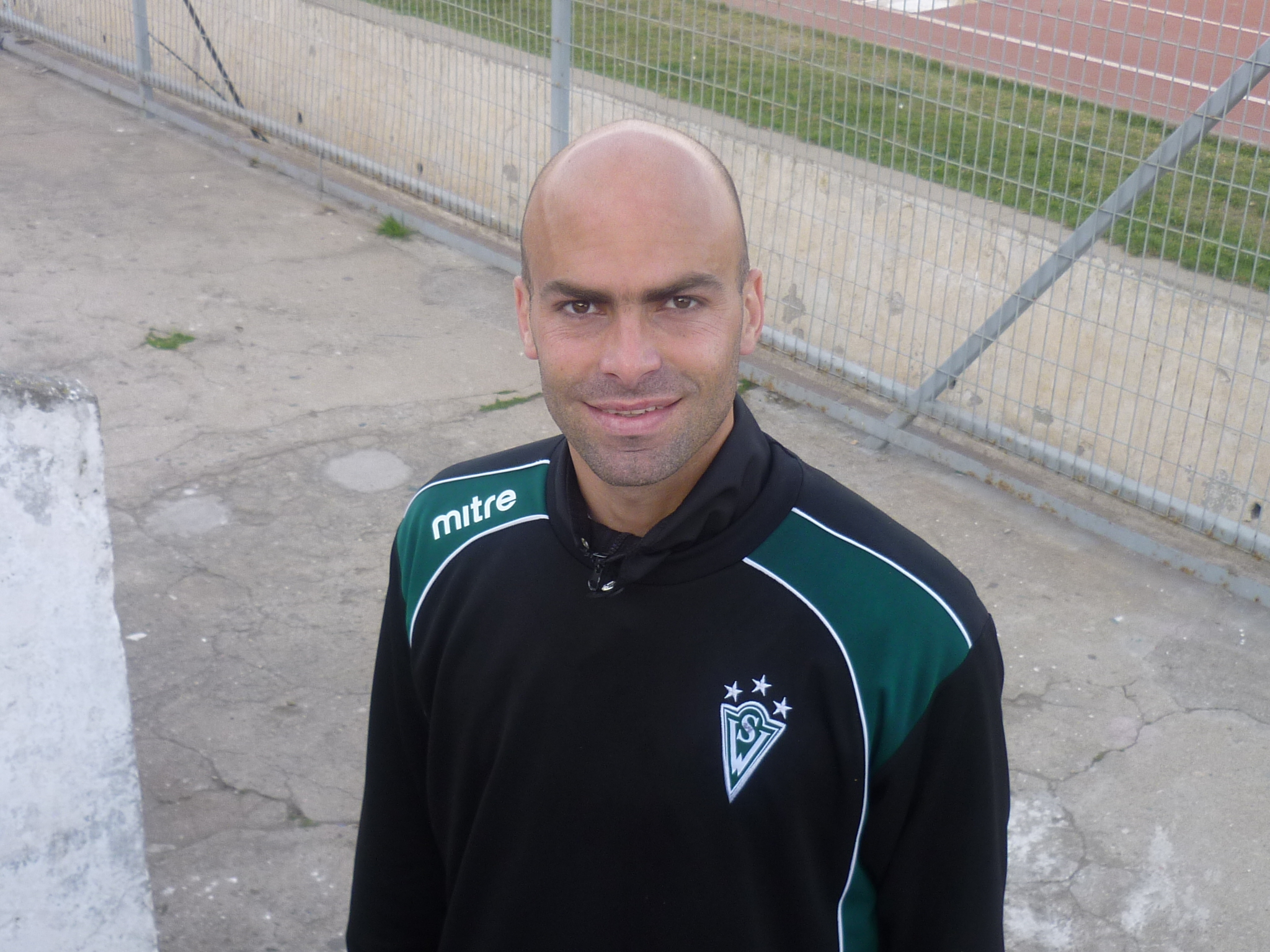
- Desvaux with Santiago Wanderers in 2010

Personal information
- Full name: Héctor Martín Desvaux
- Date of birth: February 4, 1980 (age 46)
- Place of birth: Santa Fe, Argentina
- Height: 1.81 m (5 ft 11 in)
- Position: Defender

Youth career
- La Salle
- Unión Santa Fe

Senior career*
Years	Team	Apps	(Gls)
2001–2007	Unión Santa Fe	82	(3)
2005–2006	→ Ben Hur (loan)	31	(2)
2007–2011	Gimnasia de Jujuy	78	(6)
2009	→ Atlético Tucumán (loan)	2	(0)
2010	→ Santiago Wanderers (loan)	16	(0)
2011–2012	Huracán	20	(0)
2012–2013	Ferro Carril Oeste	28	(1)
2013–2016	Gimnasia de Jujuy	58	(1)
2015–2016	→ Central Córdoba SdE (loan)	31	(2)
2017–2018	La Salle	–	(–)
- * Club domestic league appearances and goals

Héctor Martín Desvaux (born 4 February 1980 in Santa Fe) is an Argentine former football defender.

== Career ==
Desvaux started his career with Unión de Santa Fe in 2001 while the team played in the Primera División Argentina. In 2003, his club was relegated from the Argentine Primera but Desvaux stayed with them.

During the 2005–06 season, Desvaux played for Ben Hur, but returned to Unión the following season. In 2007, he returned to the top flight of Argentine football, signing for Gimnasia de Jujuy on loan. At the end of the 2007–08 season Gimnasia defeated Unión, Desvaux's former team, in the playoff to avoid relegation and the defender played both home and away games (along goalkeeper Nereo Fernández, another former Unión player loaned to Gimnasia).

In 2010, Desvaux joined Chilean side Santiago Wanderers.

In 2012–13, Desvaux played for Ferro Carril Oeste.

Desvaux ended his professional career playing for Central Córdoba de Santiago del Estero on loan from Gimnasia y Esgrima de Jujuy in 2016.
