= Matías García (footballer, born 1980) =

Argentine footballer

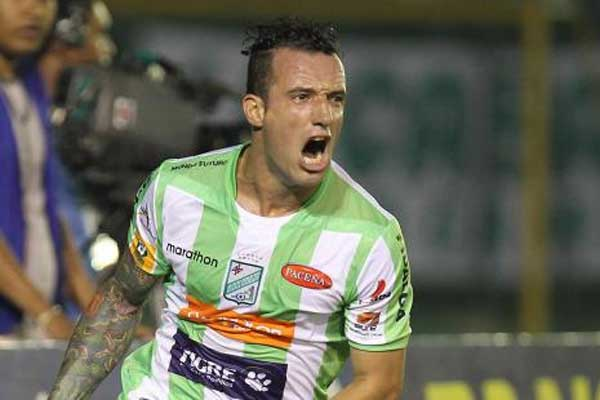
- García with Oriente Petrolero in 2016

Personal information
- Full name: Matías Sebastian García
- Date of birth: 16 January 1983 (age 43)
- Place of birth: Mendoza, Argentina
- Height: 1.70 m (5 ft 7 in)
- Position: Midfielder

Senior career*
Years	Team	Apps	(Gls)
2004	Atlético Tucumán	12	(2)
2005–2007	Huracán TA	6	(3)
2005–2006	→ FK Jūrmala (loan)	4	(1)
2007–2008	San Martín SJ	28	(1)
2008	Monagas	13	(0)
2009	Atlético Tucumán	17	(0)
2010	Huachipato	18	(2)
2011	Ferro Carril Oeste	17	(2)
2011	Gimnasia CdU	1	(0)
2012	Santamarina	2	(0)
2012–2013	Boca Unidos	28	(2)
2013–2014	Guabirá	32	(4)
2014	Oriente Petrolero	12	(1)
2015	Central Córdoba SdE	16	(0)
2016–2017	Independiente Rivadavia	2	(0)
2018	Argentino de Mendoza	25	(3)
2018	Deportivo Maipú	5	(0)
2019	Andes Talleres	7	(1)
- * Club domestic league appearances and goals

Matías Sebastián García (born 11 November 1980) is an Argentine former footballer. His last club was Andes Talleres.

== Teams ==
- (Argentina) Atlético Tucumán 2004
- (Argentina) Huracán de Tres Arroyos 2005
- (Latvia) FK Jūrmala-VV 2005–2006
- (Argentina) Huracán de Tres Arroyos 2006–2007
- (Argentina) San Martín de San Juan 2007–2008
- (Venezuela) Monagas 2008
- (Argentina) Atlético Tucumán 2009
- (Chile) Huachipato 2010
- (Argentina) Ferro Carril Oeste 2011
- (Argentina) Gimnasia de Concepción del Uruguay 2011
- (Argentina) Santamarina 2012
- (Argentina) Boca Unidos 2012–2013
- (Bolivia) Guabirá 2013–2014
- (Bolivia) Oriente Petrolero 2014
- (Argentina) Central Córdoba de Santiago del Estero 2015
- (Argentina) Independiente Rivadavia 2016–2017
- (Argentina) Argentino de Mendoza 2018
- (Argentina) Deportivo Maipú 2018
- (Argentina) Andes Talleres 2019
