= Gonzalo Díaz (footballer, born 1990) =

Argentine footballer

Personal information
- Full name: Gonzalo Orlando Díaz Nachar
- Date of birth: 1 March 1990 (age 36)
- Place of birth: Godoy Cruz, Argentina
- Height: 1.69 m (5 ft 7 in)
- Position: Left winger

Team information
- Current team: FADEP

Senior career*
Years	Team	Apps	(Gls)
2008–2012	Godoy Cruz	2	(0)
2008	→ Sportivo del Bono (loan)		
2009	→ Luján de Cuyo (loan)		
2009	→ Lanús (loan)		
2010	→ Instituto (loan)	12	(1)
2011	→ Racing (C) (loan)		
2011–2012	→ Unión (S) (loan)		
2012–2014	Defensa y Justicia	43	(1)
2014	→ Godoy Cruz (loan)	18	(1)
2014–2016	América	8	(0)
2015	→ Godoy Cruz (loan)	11	(0)
2016	→ Tijuana (loan)	13	(0)
2016–2017	Vélez Sarsfield	18	(0)
2017–2018	Defensa y Justicia	2	(0)
2020	Tacuarembó	19	(0)
2021	Mitre (SdE)	5	(0)
2021–	FADEP		
- * Club domestic league appearances and goals as of 29 June 2021

Gonzalo Orlando Díaz Nachar (born 1 March 1990) is an Argentine professional footballer who plays as a midfielder for FADEP.

== Career ==
=== Early career ===
Gonzalo Díaz was born in Mendoza, Argentina, where he began his professional career with local club Godoy Cruz in 2008 at the age of 18. Díaz took part in the team's youth system but did not break through until 2014 when he made 19 appearances for the team. Before that he had unsuccessful loan spells with Defensa y Justicia, Atletico Racing Cordoba Instituto and Lanús.

=== América (loan) ===
On 17 June 2014, Díaz joined Mexican side Club América on a year-long loan, with the club having an option to purchase the player at the end of the loan. He made his league debut on 3 August against Puebla, replacing Michael Arroyo in the 80th minute, with América winning the match 4–0. On 18 September, Díaz scored his first goal for América during the CONCACAF Champions League group-stage match against Puerto Rico Bayamón, scoring the fourth goal in a 10–1 win.

On 4 December, during the first-leg of the semifinal match against Monterrey, Díaz suffered an injury that would leave him out for the remainder of the Apertura tournament, as well as the 2015 Clausura.

== Honors ==
América

- Liga MX (1): Apertura 2014
- CONCACAF Champions league 2014–2015
