= 2002–03 Club Atlético River Plate season =

River Plate
2002–03 season
- President: José María Aguilar
- Manager: Manuel Pellegrini
- Stadium: Estadio Monumental
- Torneo Apertura: 3rd
- Torneo Clausura: Winners
- Copa Sudamericana: Round of 16
- Copa Libertadores: Quarter-finals
- Top goalscorer: League: Fernando Cavenaghi (7, Apertura); Fernando Cavenaghi (12, Clausura); All: Fernando Cavenaghi (24)
- Biggest win: Estudiantes (LP) 0–6 River; Huracán 0–6 River
- Biggest defeat: Banfield 5–0 River
Home colours	Away colours	Third colours

The 2002–03 Club Atletico River Plate season was the club's 73nd season in the Argentine Primera División.

The season was split into two tournaments (format adopted since 1990–91 season) Apertura (Opening) 2002 (from August to December 2002), and Clausura (Closing) 2003 (from February to June 2003).

The club's kit was provided by Adidas, and the sponsor was Budweiser beer.

== Season events ==
On May 23, 2002, Manuel Pellegrini was presented as new manager of River Plate.

On July 22, midfielder Lucho González moved from Huracán to River Plate. The transfer was made for US$700,000.

On June 15, 2003 during Round 16 of Torneo Clausura 2003, River Plate defeated Lanús and because Velez and Boca tied games, finished the match day as sole leaders.

On June 29, during Round 18, River defeated Olimpo in Bahía Blanca and won the championship, by getting a difference of 4 points to rivals Boca Juniors, with only 1 round to go.

== Apertura Squad ==
Note: Flags indicate national team as defined under FIFA eligibility rules; some limited exceptions apply. Players may hold more than one non-FIFA nationality.

No.	Pos.	Nation	Player
1	GK	ARG	Ángel Comizzo (Captain)
2	DF	PAR	Celso Ayala
3	DF	PAR	Ricardo Rojas
4	DF	COL	Jersson González
5	MF	ARG	Leonardo Astrada (Vice-captain)
6	DF	ARG	Martin Demichelis
7	FW	ARG	Alejandro Domínguez
8	MF	ARG	Eduardo Coudet (3rd captain)
9	FW	ARG	Fernando Cavenaghi
10	MF	ARG	Andres D'Alessandro
11	MF	ARG	Victor Zapata
12	GK	ARG	José María Buljubasich
13	DF	MEX	Javier Gandolfi
14	DF	ARG	Ariel Garcé
15	MF	ARG	Guillermo Pereyra

No.	Pos.	Nation	Player
16	DF	ARG	Matías Lequi
17	GK	ARG	Franco Costanzo
18	MF	ARG	Diego Barrado
19	MF	ARG	Gabriel Pereyra
20	MF	ARG	Juan Pablo Raponi
21	MF	MEX	Damian Alvarez
22	GK	ARG	Germán Lux
23	FW	ARG	Maxi López
24	FW	PAR	Nelson Cuevas
25	MF	ARG	Luciano Leguizamon
26	MF	ARG	Andres Aimar
27	MF	ARG	Lucho González
28	FW	ARG	Gaston Fernandez
29	MF	ARG	Oscar Ahumada
30	FW	ARG	Esteban Fuertes

== Clausura Squad ==
Note: Flags indicate national team as defined under FIFA eligibility rules; some limited exceptions apply. Players may hold more than one non-FIFA nationality.

No.	Pos.	Nation	Player
1	GK	ARG	Ángel Comizzo
2	DF	PAR	Celso Ayala
3	DF	PAR	Ricardo Rojas
4	MF	ARG	Claudio Husain
5	MF	ARG	Leonardo Astrada
6	DF	ARG	Martin Demichelis
7	FW	ARG	Alejandro Domínguez
8	MF	ARG	Eduardo Coudet (3rd captain)
9	FW	ARG	Fernando Cavenaghi (Vice-captain)
10	MF	ARG	Andres D'Alessandro (Captain)
11	MF	ARG	Victor Zapata
12	GK	ARG	José María Buljubasich
13	DF	URU	Martin del Campo
14	DF	ARG	Ariel Garcé
15	MF	ARG	Guillermo Pereyra

No.	Pos.	Nation	Player
16	DF	ARG	Matías Lequi
17	GK	ARG	Franco Costanzo
18	MF	ARG	Diego Barrado
19	MF	ARG	Osmar Ferreyra
20	FW	ARG	Darío Husaín
21	DF	ARG	Horacio Ameli
22	GK	ARG	Germán Lux
23	FW	ARG	Maxi López
24	MF	MEX	Daniel Ludueña
25	DF	URU	Máximo Lucas
26	MF	ARG	Andres Aimar
27	MF	ARG	Lucho González
28	FW	ARG	Gaston Fernandez
29	MF	ARG	Oscar Ahumada
30	FW	ARG	Esteban Fuertes

== Transfers ==
=== In ===
Date	Pos.	Name	From	Fee
11 June 2002	GK	(Argentina) José María Buljubasich	(Argentina) Rosario Central	Loan
1 July 2002	DF	(Argentina) Marcelo Gómez	(Argentina) Huracán	Loan return
1 July 2002	DF	(Colombia) Jersson González	(Turkey) Galatasaray	Loan
22 July 2002	DF	(Argentina) Lucho González	(Argentina) Huracán	USD 700,000
2 August 2002	DF	(Argentina) Esteban Fuertes	(Spain) CD Tenerife	USD 250,000 (Loan from RC Lens)
11 January 2003	MF	(Argentina) Claudio Husaín	(Italy) Napoli	USD 300,000
8 January 2003	DF	(Uruguay) Martín del Campo	(Uruguay) Nacional	Loan
11 January 2003	DF	(Uruguay) Máximo Lucas	(Uruguay) Danubio	Loan
16 January 2003	MF	(Argentina) Eduardo Coudet	(Spain) Celta de Vigo	Loan return
1 February 2003	FW	(Argentina) Darío Husaín	(Argentina) Vélez Sarsfield	Free
1 February 2003	FW	(Argentina) Horacio Ameli	(Brazil) São Paulo FC	USD 175,000 (Loan)

=== Out ===
Date	Pos.	Name	To	Fee
1 July 2002	FW	(Argentina) Ariel Ortega	(Turkey) Fenerbahçe	£6m
1 July 2002	FW	(Argentina) Martín Cardetti	(France) Paris Saint-Germain	Free
2 September 2002	MF	(Argentina) Eduardo Coudet	(Spain) Celta de Vigo	Loan €200,000
1 July 2002	MF	(Argentina) Cristian Ledesma	(Germany) Hamburger SV	USD 4,000,000
1 January 2003	DF	(Mexico) Javier Gandolfi	(Argentina) Talleres	Loan
1 January 2003	DF	(Mexico) Damián Álvarez	(Mexico) Monarcas Morelia	Loan USD 150,000
1 January 2003	DF	(Colombia) Jersson González	(Colombia) Centauros Villavicencio	Loan end
1 January 2003	DF	(Chile) Alejandro Escalona	(Chile) Everton	Loan end

== Competitions ==
=== Pre-season and friendlies ===
15 June 2002 Friendly	River Plate	2 – 1	Boca Juniors	Miami
	Lequi 90'; Raponi 90+2'	Report 1 Report 2	Burdisso 8'	Stadium: Orange Bowl; Referee: Kevin Terry

22 June 2002 Friendly	River Plate (Argentina)	1 – 1	(Mexico) Monarcas Morelia	San Jose, California
	Garcé 72'	Report 1 Report 2	Morales 39'	Stadium: Spartan Stadium; Referee: Roberi Sabella (United States)

28 June 2002 Friendly	River Plate (Argentina)	1 – 2	(Mexico) Club América	Los Angeles
	López 89'	Report	Navia 21'; Castillo 75'	Stadium: Memorial Coliseum; Referee: Ricardo Valenzuela (United States)

13 July 2002 Friendly	River Plate (Argentina)	3 – 2	(Scotland) Rangers F.C.	East Rutherford, New Jersey
	Ayala 17'; Zapata 51'; López 79'	Report	Arveladze 61'; Amoruso 78'	Stadium: Giants Stadium; Referee: Jair Maruffo (United States)

17 July 2002 Movistar Cup – SF	Monterrey (Mexico)	1 – 0	(Argentina) River Plate	Monterrey, Mexico
	Franco 19'	Report		Stadium: Estadio Tecnológico; Attendance: 28,000; Referee: Gilberto Alcalá (Mexico)

19 July 2002 Movistar Cup – 3pp	Racing Club (Argentina)	0 – 2	(Argentina) River Plate	Monterrey, Mexico
		Report	Cavenaghi 9'; Pereyra 90'	Stadium: Estadio Tecnológico; Attendance: 30,000; Referee: Gilberto Alcalá (Mexico)

7 August 2002 Friendly	Marathón (Honduras)	3 – 1	(Argentina) River Plate	San Pedro Sula, Honduras
	Domínguez 72'	Report	Scott 23'; Pereyra 41', 58'	Stadium: Olímpico Metropolitano; Attendance: 45,000; Referee: Oscar Bardales (Honduras)

10 October 2002 Friendly	Colo-Colo (Chile)	2 – 1	(Argentina) River Plate	Santiago, Chile
	Cáceres 51', 83'	Report	López 44'	Stadium: Estadio Nacional; Attendance: 45,000; Referee: Carlos Chandía (Chile)

21 January 2003 Friendly	River Plate	1 – 2	Godoy Cruz	Godoy Cruz, Mendoza
	Leguizamón 25'	Report	Torresi 79'; Herrera 84'	Stadium: Feliciano Gambarte; Referee: Aldo Muñoz

=== Apertura 2002 ===
==== League table ====
Pos	Team	Pld	W	D	L	GF	GA	GD	Pts
1	Independiente	19	13	4	2	48	19	+29	43
2	Boca Juniors	19	12	4	3	32	15	+17	40
3	River Plate	19	11	3	5	35	23	+12	36
4	Chacarita Juniors	19	9	3	7	19	21	−2	30
5	Vélez Sársfield	19	8	4	7	23	19	+4	28

==== Results by matchday ====
Matchday	1	2	3	4	5	6	7	8	9	10	11	12	13	14	15	16	17	18	19
Ground	H	A	H	A	A	H	A	H	A	H	A	H	A	H	A	H	A	H	A
Result	D	W	W	W	W	L	D	D	W	W	W	W	L	L	W	L	L	W	W
Position	7	7	5	4	1	3	3	4	2	2	2	2	2	3	3	3	3	3	3

A = Away; H = Home; W = Win; D = Draw; L = Loss

==== Fixtures and results ====
28 July 2002 Round 1	River Plate	0 – 0	Newell's	Buenos Aires
15.30 (UTC−3)				Stadium: El Monumental; Attendance: 32,000; Referee: Ángel Sánchez

4 August 2002 Round 2	Vélez Sársfield	0 – 1	River Plate	Buenos Aires
			Álvarez 35'	Stadium: José Amalfitani Stadium; Attendance: 28,000; Referee: Horacio Elizondo

11 August 2002 Round 3	River Plate	1 – 0	Colón	Buenos Aires
	López 35'			Stadium: El Monumental; Attendance: 48,000; Referee: Oscar Sequeira

18 August 2002 Round 4	Chacarita Juniors	1 – 2	River Plate	Buenos Aires
	Cella 90'		Domínguez 62'; Cuevas 79'	Stadium: José Amalfitani Stadium; Attendance: 16,000; Referee: Claudio Martín

25 August 2002 Round 5	Estudiantes	0 – 6	River Plate	La Plata
			Domínguez 6'; González 17'; Fuertes 24', 33'; Coudet 27'; Quatrocchi 54' (o.g.)	Stadium: Jorge Luis Hirschi; Attendance: 21,000; Referee: Fabián Madorrán

1 September 2002 Round 6	River Plate	1 – 2	Huracán	Buenos Aires
	Domínguez 82'		Ortiz 25'; Padra 79'	Stadium: El Monumental; Attendance: 30,000; Referee: Horacio Elizondo

8 September 2002 Round 7	Arsenal	0 – 0	River Plate	Lanús
		Report		Stadium: La Fortaleza; Attendance: 11,000; Referee: Ángel Sánchez

15 September 2002 Round 8	River Plate	1 – 1	Talleres	Buenos Aires
	Cavenaghi 84'	Report	Quinteros 43'	Stadium: Estadio Monumental Antonio Vespucio Liberti; Attendance: 18,900; Referee: Gabriel Brazenas

22 September 2002 Round 9	Independiente	1 – 2	River Plate	Avellaneda
	Pusineri 89'	Report	González 46'; D'Alessandro 87'	Stadium: Libertadores de América; Attendance: 45,000; Referee: Claudio Martín

29 September 2002 Round 10	River Plate	5 – 2	Rosario Central	Buenos Aires
	D'Alessandro 50', 68' (pen.); Domínguez 59'; Demichelis 62'; Cavenaghi 89'	Report	Garcé 19' (o.g.); B.Schelotto 78'	Stadium: Estadio Monumental Antonio Vespucio Liberti; Attendance: 30,000; Referee: Daniel Giménez

6 October 2002 Round 11	Nueva Chicago	1 – 3	River Plate	Buenos Aires
	Carreño 81'	Report	González 14', 52'; D'Alessandro 36'	Stadium: Pedro Bidegain; Attendance: 22,500; Referee: Ángel Sánchez

13 October 2002 Round 12	River Plate	4 – 2	Unión	Buenos Aires
	Domínguez 32'; Pereyra 73'; Cavenaghi 77', 86'	Report	Torres 21'; Zapata 85'	Stadium: Estadio Monumental Antonio Vespucio Liberti; Attendance: 24,000; Referee: Roberto Ruscio

20 October 2002 Round 13	Banfield	5 – 0	River Plate	Banfield
	Colautti 7', 53'; Demichelis 28' (o.g.); Jiménez 52'; Moreno y Fabianesi 41'	Report		Stadium: Estadio Florencio Sola; Attendance: 22,000; Referee: Héctor Baldassi
Note: Match suspended at 66' due to incidents.

27 October 2002 Round 14	River Plate	1 – 2	Boca Juniors	Buenos Aires
	Fuertes 52'	Report	Delgado 42' (f.k.), 77'	Stadium: Estadio Monumental Antonio Vespucio Liberti; Attendance: 45,000; Referee: Horacio Elizondo

3 November 2002 Round 15	San Lorenzo	0 – 1	River Plate	Buenos Aires
		Report	Fuertes 42'	Stadium: Pedro Bidegain; Attendance: 19,000; Referee: Ángel Sánchez

10 November 2002 Round 16	River Plate	1 – 2	Lanús	Buenos Aires
	García 52' (o.g.)	Report	Mannara 18'; Bustos Montoya 37'	Stadium: Estadio Monumental Antonio Vespucio Liberti; Attendance: 12,390; Referee: pt:Juan Pablo Pompei

17 November 2002 Round 17	Gimnasia (La Plata)	2 – 0	River Plate	La Plata
	Turienzo 18'; Enría 32'	Report		Stadium: Estadio Juan Carmelo Zerillo; Attendance: 12,000; Referee: Fabián Madorrán

24 November 2002 Round 18	River Plate	2 – 1	Olimpo	Buenos Aires
	Fuertes 3'; Cavenaghi 30'	Report	Bustamante 70'	Stadium: Estadio Monumental Antonio Vespucio Liberti; Attendance: 22,000; Referee: Gustavo Bassi

30 November 2002 Round 19	Racing Club	1 – 4	River Plate	Avellaneda
	Aimar 6'; Fuertes 45'; Cavenaghi 58', 67'	Report	Milito 76'	Stadium: Estadio Presidente Juan Domingo Perón; Attendance: 16,000; Referee: Claudio Martín

=== Clausura 2003 ===
==== League table ====
Pos	Team	Pld	W	D	L	GF	GA	GD	Pts
1	River Plate	19	13	4	2	43	18	+25	43
2	Boca Juniors	19	12	3	4	36	23	+13	39
3	Vélez Sársfield	19	12	2	5	27	12	+15	38
4	Rosario Central	19	10	7	2	40	18	+22	37
5	Olimpo	19	9	4	6	22	17	+5	31

==== Results by matchday ====
Matchday	1	2	3	4	5	6	7	8	9	10	11	12	13	14	15	16	17	18	19
Ground	A	H	A	H	H	A	H	A	H	A	H	A	H	A	H	A	H	A	H
Result	D	L	W	W	W	W	W	W	W	W	D	D	W	D	W	W	W	W	L
Position	6	13	9	8	5	4	2	1	1	1	1	3	3	3	2	1	1	1	1

A = Away; H = Home; W = Win; D = Draw; L = Loss

==== Fixtures and results ====
16 February 2003 Round 1	Newell's	2 – 2	River Plate	Rosario
	Rosales 61'; Marino 83'	Report	Fuertes 75'; Ameli 89'	Stadium: Marcelo Bielsa; Attendance: 36,500; Referee: Fabián Madorrán

23 February 2003 Round 2	River Plate	0 – 1	Vélez Sarsfield	Buenos Aires
		Report	Nanni 90'	Stadium: El Monumental; Attendance: 30,000; Referee: Gabriel Brazenas

2 March 2003 Round 3	Colón	0 – 2	River Plate	Santa Fe
		Report	Cavenaghi 60'; González 76'	Stadium: Brigadier General Estanislao López; Attendance: 30,000; Referee: Sergio Pezzotta

9 March 2003 Round 4	River Plate	2 – 1	Chacarita Juniors	Buenos Aires
	Husaín 45'; Ameli 90'	Report	Pena 24' (pen.)	Stadium: El Monumental; Attendance: 30,000; Referee: Roberto Ruscio

16 March 2003 Round 5	River Plate	1 – 0	Estudiantes	Buenos Aires
	Husaín 63'	Report		Stadium: El Monumental; Attendance: 30,000; Referee: Ángel Sánchez

23 March 2003 Round 6	Huracán	0 – 6	River Plate	Buenos Aires
		Report	Cavenaghi 51', 52'; Husaín 62' 51'; Fuertes 77'; D'Alessandro 80'; Barrado 85'	Stadium: Tomás Adolfo Ducó; Attendance: 30,000; Referee: Claudio Martín

30 March 2003 Round 7	River Plate	3 – 1	Arsenal	Buenos Aires
	Cavenaghi 49', 65'; D'Alessandro 77' (pen.)	Report	González 88' (pen.)	Stadium: El Monumental; Attendance: 35,000; Referee: Rafael Furchi

6 April 2003 Round 8	Talleres	1 – 3	River Plate	Córdoba
	Real 33' (pen.)	Report	Pereyra 4'; Coudet 58'; D'Alessandro 66'	Stadium: Mario Alberto Kempes; Attendance: 30,000; Referee: Daniel Giménez

13 April 2003 Round 9	River Plate	2 – 1	Independiente	Buenos Aires
	Fuertes 71'; Milito 84' (o.g.)	Report	Montenegro 13'	Stadium: El Monumental; Attendance: 60,000; Referee: Héctor Baldassi

20 April 2003 Round 10	Rosario Central	0 – 2	River Plate	Rosario
	Arias 41'; Figueroa 43'	Report	González 26'; Cavenaghi 57'	Stadium: Gigante de Arroyito; Attendance: 44,500; Referee: Rafael Furchi

4 May 2003 Round 11	River Plate	1 – 1	Nueva Chicago	Buenos Aires
	Cavenaghi 54'	Report	Amaya 70'	Stadium: El Monumental; Attendance: 35,000; Referee: Claudio Martín

11 May 2003 Round 12	Unión	1 – 1	River Plate	Paraná
	Capria 32' (f.k.)	Report	González 15'	Stadium: Presbítero Bartolomé Grella; Attendance: 20,000; Referee: Horacio Elizondo

24 May 2003 Round 13	River Plate	2 – 1	Banfield	Buenos Aires
	Husaín 10'; Cavenaghi 54'	Report	Colautti 72'	Stadium: El Monumental; Referee: Oscar Sequeira

1 June 2003 Round 14	Boca Juniors	2 – 2	River Plate	Buenos Aires
	Barros Schelotto 67', 70'	Report	D'Alessandro 10'; Cavenaghi 38' (pen.)	Stadium: La Bombonera; Referee: Héctor Baldassi

8 June 2003 Round 15	River Plate	4 – 0	San Lorenzo	Buenos Aires
	Cavenaghi 45'; Lequi 64'; D'Alessandro 35'; Pereyra 84'	Report		Stadium: El Monumental; Attendance: 40,000; Referee: Gabriel Brazenas

15 June 2003 Round 16	Lanús	3 – 4	River Plate	Lanús
	Garcé 4' (o.g.); Benítez 22'; Morales 80'	Report	Cavenaghi 9'; Fuertes 37', 47'; González 42'	Stadium: La Fortaleza; Attendance: 30,000; Referee: Claudio Martín

22 June 2003 Round 17	River Plate	3 – 0	Gimnasia y Esgrima	Buenos Aires
	Cavenaghi 1'; Fuertes 6'; D'Alessandro 79'	Report		Stadium: El Monumental; Attendance: 35,000; Referee: Oscar Sequeira

29 June 2003 Round 18	Olimpo	0 – 2	River Plate	Bahía Blanca
		Report	Zapata 80'; Barrado 86'	Stadium: Roberto Carminatti; Attendance: 13,000; Referee: Gabriel Brazenas

6 July 2003 Round 19	River Plate	1 – 3	Racing Club	Buenos Aires
	Cavenaghi 62'	Report	Romero 27'; Vitali 41'; Mirošević 73'	Stadium: El Monumental; Attendance: 59,086; Referee: Daniel Giménez

==== Evolution of the league table ====
River Plate, Boca Juniors and Velez Sarsfield were the teams who kept the championship lead for most of the tournament.

Positions by round
Team ╲ Round	1	2	3	4	5	6	7	8	9	10	11	12	13	14	15	16	17	18	19
River Plate	6	13	9	8	5	4	2	1	1	1	1	3	3	3	2	1	1	1	1
Boca Juniors	1	8	6	3	1	1	1	1	1	1	2	1	1	2	1	2	3	2	2
Vélez Sarsfield	1	1	1	3	6	5	3	1	1	3	2	1	1	1	3	3	2	3	3

Source: www.rsssf.com

=== 2002 Copa Sudamericana ===
4 September 2002 2nd stage	Racing Club (Argentina)	1 – 0	(Argentina) River Plate	Buenos Aires, Argentina
21.10 (UTC−3)	Estévez 34' (pen.)			Stadium: José Amalfitani Stadium; Referee: Héctor Baldassi

25 September 2002 2nd stage	River Plate (Argentina)	0 – 0	(Argentina) Racing Club	Buenos Aires, Argentina
				Stadium: El Monumental; Referee: Horacio Elizondo

=== 2003 Copa Libertadores ===
==== Group stage ====
Pos	Team	Pld	W	D	L	GF	GA	GD	Pts	CAL	RIV	LIB	EME
1	(Colombia) Deportivo Cali	6	4	0	2	9	3	+6	12		2–0	1–0	2–1
2	(Argentina) River Plate	6	4	0	2	10	7	+3	12	2–1		3–1	2–0
3	(Paraguay) Libertad	6	2	1	3	9	9	0	7	1–0	0–2		2–2
4	(Ecuador) Emelec	6	1	1	4	6	15	−9	4	0–4	3–1	1–5	

19 February 2003 Group Stage R1	Deportivo Cali (Colombia)	2 – 0	(Argentina) River Plate	Cali, Colombia
	Murillo 35'; Castillo 59'			Stadium: Olímpico Pascual Guerrero; Attendance: 38,000; Referee: Gilberto Hidalgo (Peru)

27 February 2003 Group Stage R2	River Plate (Argentina)	3 – 1	(Paraguay) Libertad	Buenos Aires, Argentina
	Fuertes 68', 83' (pen.); González 76'	Report	Benítez 64'	Stadium: El Monumental; Attendance: 15,000; Referee: Wilson de Souza (Brazil)

13 March 2003 Group Stage R3	Emelec (Ecuador)	3 – 1	(Argentina) River Plate	Guayaquil, Ecuador
	Pacheco 60' (pen.); Rey 78'; Tenorio 87'		Fuertes 39'	Stadium: George Capwell; Attendance: 15,000; Referee: Márcio Rezende (Brazil)

20 March 2003 Group Stage R4	River Plate (Argentina)	2 – 1	(Colombia) Deportivo Cali	Buenos Aires, Argentina
	Cavenaghi 35'; Coudet 69'	Report	Castillo 26'	Stadium: El Monumental; Attendance: 27,500; Referee: Carlos Simon (Brazil)

2 April 2003 Group Stage R5	Libertad (Paraguay)	0 – 2	(Argentina) River Plate	Asunción, Paraguay
		Report	D'Alessandro 81'; Cavenaghi 90' (pen.)	Stadium: Defensores del Chaco; Attendance: 21,000; Referee: Jorge Larrionda (Uruguay)

17 April 2003 Group Stage R6	River Plate (Argentina)	2 – 0	(Ecuador) Emelec	Buenos Aires, Argentina
	Fernández 42'; D'Alessandro 80'	Report		Stadium: El Monumental; Attendance: 30,000; Referee: Carlos Torres (Paraguay)

==== Knockout phase ====
===== Round of 16 =====
1 May 2003 R16 First leg	River Plate (Argentina)	2 – 1	(Brazil) Corinthians	Buenos Aires, Argentina
	D'Alessandro 84' (f.k.); Cavenaghi 89'	Report	Wagner 68'	Stadium: El Monumental; Attendance: 55,000; Referee: Gilberto Hidalgo (Peru)

14 May 2003 R16 Second leg	Corinthians (Brazil)	1 – 2 (2-4 agg.)	(Argentina) River Plate	São Paulo, Brazil
	Liédson 9'	Report	Demichelis 22'; Fuertes 74' (pen.)	Stadium: Estádio do Morumbi; Attendance: 66,000; Referee: Óscar Ruiz (Colombia)

===== Quarter-finals =====
20 May 2003 QF First leg	River Plate (Argentina)	2 – 1	(Colombia) América	Buenos Aires, Argentina
	D'Alessandro 16'; Lequi 90'	Report	Vásquez 58'	Stadium: El Monumental; Attendance: 50,000; Referee: Paulo de Oliveira(Brazil)

27 May 2003 QF Second leg	América (Colombia)	4 – 1 (5-3 agg.)	(Argentina) River Plate	Cali, Colombia
	Vásquez 29', 35'; Castillo 87'; Moreno 90'	Report	Ludueña 68'	Stadium: Olímpico Pascual Guerrero; Attendance: 50,000; Referee: Gustavo Méndez (referee) (Uruguay)

== Squad statistics ==
=== Appearances and goals ===
No.	Pos.	Name	Total		League		2002 Copa Sudamericana		2003 Copa Libertadores		Discipline	
No.	Pos.	Name	Apps	Goals	Apps	Goals	Apps	Goals	Apps	Goals	Yellow card	Red card
1	GK	(Argentina) Ángel Comizzo	17	0	15	0	1	0	1	0	3	0
2	DF	(Paraguay) Celso Ayala	18	0	16	0	2	0	0	0	2	1
3	DF	(Paraguay) Ricardo Ismael Rojas	24	0	20	0	1	0	3	0	8	1
4 (Note: Wore no. 4 jersey during Torneo Apertura 2002 and 2002 Copa Sudamericana)	MF	(Colombia) Jersson González	8	0	6	0	2	0	0	0	3	0
4 (Note: Wore no. 4 jersey during Torneo Clausura 2003 and 2003 Copa Libertadores)	MF	(Argentina) Claudio Husaín	18	1	12	1	1	0	5	0	6	2
5	MF	(Argentina) Leonardo Astrada	27	0	22	0	1	0	4	0	5	0
6	DF	(Argentina) Martín Demichelis	46	2	35	1	2	0	9	1	12	1
7	FW	(Argentina) Alejandro Domínguez	16	5	15	5	1	0	0	0	4	0
8	MF	(Argentina) Eduardo Coudet	28	3	20	2	0	0	8	1	3	0
9	FW	(Argentina) Fernando Cavenaghi	43	24	33	21	2	0	8	3	2	0
10	MF	(Argentina) Andrés D'Alessandro	40	14	29	10	1	0	10	4	9	0
11	MF	(Argentina) Víctor Zapata	22	1	15	1	0	0	7	0	2	0
12	GK	(Argentina) José María Buljubasich	26	0	17	0	1	0	8	0	1	0
13 (Note: Wore no. 13 jersey during Torneo Apertura 2002)	DF	(Mexico) Javier Gandolfi	1	0	1	0	0	0	0	0	0	0
13 (Note: Wore no. 13 jersey during Torneo Clausura 2003 and no. 25 during 2003 Copa Libertadores)	DF	(Uruguay) Martín del Campo	4	0	2	0	0	0	2	0	0	0
14	DF	(Argentina) Ariel Garcé	43	0	34	0	1	0	8	0	5	1
15	MF	(Argentina) Guillermo Pereyra	32	3	24	3	1	0	7	0	1	2
16	DF	(Argentina) Matías Lequi	27	2	20	1	0	0	7	1	5	0
17	GK	(Argentina) Franco Costanzo	7	0	6	0	0	1	0	0	0	0
18	MF	(Argentina) Diego Barrado	17	2	11	2	2	0	4	0	0	0
19 (Note: Wore no. 19 jersey during Torneo Apertura 2002)	MF	(Argentina) Gabriel Pereyra	3	0	3	0	0	0	0	0	1	0
19 (Note: Wore no. 19 jersey during Torneo Clausura 2003)	MF	(Argentina) Osmar Ferreyra	2	0	2	0	0	0	0	0	0	0
20 (Note: Wore no. 20 jersey during Torneo Apertura 2002 and 2002 Copa Sudamericana)	MF	(Argentina) Juan Pablo Raponi	1	0	1	0	0	0	0	0	0	0
20 (Note: Wore no. 20 jersey during Torneo Clausura 2003 and no. 22 during 2003 Copa Libertadores)	FW	(Argentina) Darío Husaín	19	3	11	3	0	0	8	0	1	1
21 (Note: Wore no. 21 jersey during Torneo Apertura 2002 and 2002 Copa Sudamericana)	MF	(Mexico) Damián Ariel Álvarez	8	1	6	1	2	0	0	0	0	0
21 (Note: Wore no. 21 jersey during Torneo Clausura 2003 and 2003 Copa Libertadores)	DF	(Argentina) Horacio Ameli	23	2	16	2	0	0	7	0	8	1
22 (Note: Wore no. 12 jersey during Torneo Apertura 2002 and 2002 Copa Sudamericana, wore no. 31 during Torneo Clausura 2003)	GK	(Argentina) Germán Lux	0	0	0	0	0	0	0	0	0	0
23	FW	(Argentina) Maxi López	7	1	6	1	1	0	0	0	0	0
24	FW	(Paraguay) Nelson Cuevas	1	0	1	0	0	0	0	0	0	0
25	FW	(Argentina) Luciano Leguizamón	2	0	2	0	0	0	0	0	0	0
26	FW	(Argentina) Andrés Aimar	1	1	1	1	0	0	0	0	0	0
27	MF	(Argentina) Lucho González	42	9	32	8	2	0	8	1	0	0
28	MF	(Mexico) Daniel Ludueña	18	1	14	0	0	0	4	1	0	0
30	FW	(Argentina) Esteban Fuertes	45	16	34	12	1	0	10	4	0	0

Source:www.livefutbol.com

== Sources ==
- Estévez, Diego Ariel; Ciento cinco: historia de un siglo rojo y blanco; 2006 ISBN 950-754-198-5
