= 2001–02 Club Atlético River Plate season =

River Plate
2001–02 season
- President: David Pintado; José María Aguilar (since December 2001)
- Manager: Ramón Díaz
- Stadium: Estadio Monumental
- Torneo Apertura: Runners-up
- Torneo Clausura: Winners
- Copa Mercosur: Group stage
- Copa Libertadores: Round of 16
- Top goalscorer: League: Martín Cardetti (17, Apertura); Fernando Cavenaghi (15, Clausura); All: Martín Cardetti (20)
- Biggest win: River 6–1 Rosario Central; Independiente 0–5 River
- Biggest defeat: Grêmio 4–0 River
Home colours	Away colours	Third colours

The 2001–02 season is River Plate's 72nd season in the Argentine Primera División. The season was split into two tournaments (format adopted since 1990–91 season) Apertura (Opening) 2001 (from August to December 2001), and Clausura (Closing) 2002 (from February to May 2002).

The club's kit was provided by Adidas, and the sponsor was Quilmes beer until December 2001, and Budweiser beer since March 2002.

== Season events ==
After finishing both tournaments of 2000–01 season (Apertura 2000 and Clausura 2001) in second place, River Plate joined eight players to the squad (five before the start of the Apertura tournament and three before the start of Clausura). This season also marked the return of Ramón Díaz as Coach, after he had left in January 2000.

On 9 March 2002, River Plate signed a deal with Budweiser to be the main sponsor of the team kit. The 2-year deal was closed for AR$2,400,000 per year (equivalent to US$780,487.80 according to March 2002 exchange rate).

On 19 March, River Plate introduced the new kit for the main team. The kit was worn for the first time on 24 March, when River visited Velez Sarsfield.

After finishing vice-champions of Racing Club, in the first half of the season, River Plate won the Clausura Championship, qualifying for the 2002 Copa Sudamericana and 2003 Copa Libertadores.

== Apertura squad ==
Note: Flags indicate national team as defined under FIFA eligibility rules; some limited exceptions apply. Players may hold more than one non-FIFA nationality.

No.	Pos.	Nation	Player
1	GK	ARG	Franco Costanzo
2	DF	PAR	Celso Ayala
3	DF	ARG	Matías Lequi
4	DF	ARG	Gustavo Lombardi
5	MF	ARG	Leonardo Astrada
6	DF	COL	Mario Yepes
7	FW	ARG	Maxi López
8	MF	ARG	Eduardo Coudet
9	FW	ARG	Martín Cardetti
10	FW	ARG	Ariel Ortega (Vice-Captain)
11	MF	ARG	Andres D'Alessandro
12	GK	ARG	Ángel Comizzo (Captain)
14	DF	ARG	Ariel Garcé

No.	Pos.	Nation	Player
15	MF	ARG	Guillermo Pereyra
16	DF	PAR	Pedro Sarabia
18	MF	MEX	Damian Álvarez
19	MF	ARG	Esteban Cambiasso
21	DF	PAR	Ricardo Rojas
22	MF	ARG	Victor Zapata
23	MF	ARG	Cristian Ledesma
24	FW	PAR	Nelson Cuevas
25	DF	CHI	Alejandro Escalona
26	DF	ARG	Martin Demichelis
27	MF	ARG	Marcelo Escudero
30	FW	ARG	Fernando Cavenaghi
31	GK	ARG	Germán Lux

== Clausura Squad ==
Note: Flags indicate national team as defined under FIFA eligibility rules; some limited exceptions apply. Players may hold more than one non-FIFA nationality.

No.	Pos.	Nation	Player
1	GK	ARG	Franco Costanzo
2	DF	PAR	Celso Ayala
3	DF	ARG	Matías Lequi
4	MF	ARG	Claudio Husain
5	MF	ARG	Leonardo Astrada
7	FW	ARG	Maxi López
8	MF	ARG	Eduardo Coudet
10	FW	ARG	Ariel Ortega (Vice-Captain)
11	MF	ARG	Andres D'Alessandro
12	GK	ARG	Ángel Comizzo (Captain)
14	DF	ARG	Ariel Garcé
15	MF	ARG	Guillermo Pereyra
16	DF	PAR	Pedro Sarabia

No.	Pos.	Nation	Player
18	FW	ARG	Juan Esnáider
19	MF	ARG	Esteban Cambiasso
20	FW	URU	Daniel Fonseca
21	DF	PAR	Ricardo Rojas
22	MF	ARG	Victor Zapata
23	MF	ARG	Cristian Ledesma
24	FW	PAR	Nelson Cuevas
25	DF	CHI	Alejandro Escalona
26	DF	ARG	Martin Demichelis
27	MF	ARG	Marcelo Escudero
30	FW	ARG	Fernando Cavenaghi
31	GK	ARG	Germán Lux
35	FW	ARG	Alejandro Domínguez

== Transfers ==
=== In ===
- Angel Comizzo July 2001, from Monarcas Morelia
- Esteban Cambiasso July 2001, from Independiente
- Matías Lequi August 2001, from Rosario Central
- Alejandro Escalona July 2001, from S.L. Benfica
- Juan Esnáider January 2002
- Alejandro Damián Domínguez January 2002
- Daniel Fonseca January 2002
- Claudio Husaín January 2002, from S.S.C. Napoli

=== Out ===
- Javier Saviola July 2001 to Barcelona FC
- Mario Yepes January 2002 to FC Nantes Atlantique
- Gustavo Lombardi January 2002 to Deportivo Alavés
- Damián Ariel Álvarez January 2002 to Reggina Calcio

== Competitions ==
=== Apertura 2001 ===
==== Fixtures and results ====
19 August 2001 Round 1	Talleres	1–3	River Plate	Córdoba
	La Paglia 8'	Summary	Cardetti 25' 43'; Ayala 41'	Stadium: Estadio Mario Alberto Kempes; Attendance: 25,000; Referee: Ángel Sánchez

26 August 2001 Round 2	River Plate	4–1	Huracán	Buenos Aires
	Cambiasso 1'; Moner(o.g.) 12'; Ortega 63'; Cardetti 66'	Summary	Morquio 84'	Stadium: Estadio Monumental Antonio Vespucio Liberti; Attendance: 26,000; Referee: Horacio Elizondo

29 August 2001 Round 3	Unión	1–1	River Plate	Santa Fe
	San Martín 48'	Summary	Cambiasso 80'	Stadium: Estadio 15 de Abril; Attendance: 16,000; Referee: Horacio Elizondo

2 September 2001 Round 4	River Plate	3–0	Estudiantes	Buenos Aires
	Cambiasso 28' 35'; D'Alessandro 92'	Summary		Stadium: Estadio Monumental Antonio Vespucio Liberti; Attendance: 20,500; Referee: Gabriel Brazenas

9 September 2001 Round 5	Nueva Chicago	2–1	River Plate	Buenos Aires
	Mandra 42'; Jesús 77'	Summary	Cambiasso 81'	Stadium: Estadio José Amalfitani; Referee: Jorge Rattalino

17 September 2001 Round 6	River Plate	1–1	Boca Juniors	Buenos Aires
	Cambiasso 17'	Summary	Gaitán 83'	Stadium: Estadio Monumental Antonio Vespucio Liberti; Attendance: 55,000; Referee: Claudio Martín

23 September 2001 Round 7	Banfield	1–1	River Plate	Banfield
	Del Río 80'	Summary	Cavenaghi 8'	Stadium: Estadio Florencio Sola; Attendance: 25,000; Referee: Héctor Baldassi

30 September 2001 Round 8	River Plate	4–2	Vélez Sarsfield	Buenos Aires
	Cardetti 33' 84'; Hidalgo(o.g.) 76'; D'Alessandro 92'	Summary	Husaín 10'; Buján 69'	Stadium: Estadio Monumental Antonio Vespucio Liberti; Attendance: 11,000; Referee: Roberto Ruscio

3 October 2001 Round 9	Independiente	0–5	River Plate	Avellaneda
		Summary	D'Alessandro 15'; Marchesini(o.g.) 20'; Cardetti 62'(p) 75'; Cambiasso 79'	Stadium: Estadio Libertadores de América; Attendance: 21,000; Referee: Horacio Elizondo

21 October 2001 Round 10	River Plate	2–0	Newell's	Buenos Aires
	Cardetti 24'(p); Coudet 88'	Summary		Stadium: Estadio Monumental Antonio Vespucio Liberti; Attendance: 12,300; Referee: Rafael Furchi

28 October 2001 Round 11	Belgrano	0–2	River Plate	Córdoba
	Ortega 34'; Cardetti 77'	Summary		Stadium: Estadio Mario Alberto Kempes; Attendance: 25,000; Referee: Gabriel Brazenas

4 November 2001 Round 12	River Plate	2–2	San Lorenzo	Buenos Aires
	Cardetti 44'; M.López 77'	Summary	Acosta 31' 50'(p)	Stadium: Estadio Monumental Antonio Vespucio Liberti; Attendance: 30,000; Referee: Claudio Martín

11 November 2001 Round 13	Colón	1–0	River Plate	Santa Fe
	Graf 86'	Summary		Stadium: Estadio Brigadier General Estanislao López; Attendance: 25,000; Referee: Horacio Elizondo

18 November 2001 Round 14	River Plate	4–0	Gimnasia (La Plata)	Buenos Aires
	Cardetti 13' 38'(p); Ortega 18'; Coudet 83'	Summary		Stadium: Estadio Monumental Antonio Vespucio Liberti; Attendance: 14,779; Referee: Sergio Pezzotta

25 November 2001 Round 15	Chacarita Juniors	1–4	River Plate	Buenos Aires
	Moreno 55'(p)	Summary	Mario Yepes 1'; Cardetti 28'; D'Alessandro 39' 56'(f.k.)	Stadium: Estadio Arquitecto Ricardo Etcheverry; Attendance: 22,000; Referee: Roberto Ruscio

2 December 2001 Round 16	Racing Club	1–1	River Plate	Avellaneda
	Bedoya 86'	Summary	Cambiasso 45'	Stadium: Estadio Presidente Perón; Attendance: 48,000; Referee: Hector Baldassi

9 November 2001 Round 17	River Plate	4–0	Lanús	Buenos Aires
	D'Alessandro 4'(p); Cambiasso 6'; Álvarez 16'; Cardetti 63'(p)	Summary		Stadium: Estadio Monumental Antonio Vespucio Liberti; Attendance: 10,500; Referee: Roberto Ruscio

16 December 2001 Round 18	Argentinos Juniors	1–3	River Plate	Buenos Aires
	Yaqué 40'	Summary	Ortega 27'; Mario Yepes 72'; Cavenaghi 90'	Stadium: Estadio Arquitecto Ricardo Etcheverry; Attendance: 22,000; Referee: Héctor Baldassi

27 December 2001 Round 19	River Plate	6–1	Rosario Central	Buenos Aires
	Cardetti 1' 49' 55'(p); Pereyra 41'; Ortega 59'; Álvarez 85'	Summary	De Bruno 20'	Stadium: Estadio Monumental Antonio Vespucio Liberti; Attendance: 15,000; Referee: Ángel Sánchez

==== League table ====
Pos	Team	Pld	W	D	L	GF	GA	GD	Pts
1	Racing	19	12	6	1	34	17	+17	42
2	River Plate	19	12	5	2	51	16	+35	41
3	Boca Juniors	19	9	6	4	41	27	+14	33
4	Colón	19	8	8	3	24	16	+8	32
5	San Lorenzo	19	8	7	4	28	22	+6	31

=== Clausura 2002 ===
==== Fixtures & results ====
10 February 2002 Round 1	River Plate	3–1	Talleres	Buenos Aires
	Cavenaghi 22'; Ortega 87'(p.k.) 89'	Summary	Astudillo 43'	Stadium: Estadio Monumental Antonio Vespucio Liberti; Attendance: 20,000; Referee: Gabriel Brazenas

17 February 2002 Round 2	Huracán	0–4	River Plate	Buenos Aires
		Summary	Ortega 44'(p.k.); Cavenaghi 49' 51'; D'Alessandro 59'	Stadium: Estadio Tomás Adolfo Ducó; Attendance: 20,000; Referee: Horacio Elizondo

20 February 2002 Round 3	River Plate	6–0	Unión	Buenos Aires
	Ortega 27' 37' 42'(p.k.) 82'; Cavenaghi 62' 71'	Summary		Stadium: Estadio Monumental Antonio Vespucio Liberti; Attendance: 12,000; Referee: Gabriel Brazenas

24 February 2002 Round 4	Estudiantes	2–3	River Plate	La Plata
	Quatrocchi 30'; Demichelis(o.g.) 89'	Summary	Cavenaghi 53' 54' 63'	Stadium: Estadio Jorge Luis Hirschi; Attendance: 20,000; Referee: Sergio Pezzotta

3 March 2002 Round 5	River Plate	0–0	Nueva Chicago	Buenos Aires
		Summary		Stadium: Estadio Monumental Antonio Vespucio Liberti; Attendance: 26,000; Referee: Daniel Giménez

10 March 2002 Round 6	Boca Juniors	0–3	River Plate	Buenos Aires
		Summary	Cambiasso 26'; Coudet 41'; Rojas 88'	Stadium: Estadio Alberto J. Armando; Attendance: 51,000; Referee: Héctor Baldassi

17 March 2002 Round 7	River Plate	0–0	Banfield	Buenos Aires
		Summary		Stadium: Estadio Monumental Antonio Vespucio Liberti; Attendance: 30,000; Referee: Gabriel Brazenas

24 March 2002 Round 8	Vélez Sársfield	0–1	River Plate	Buenos Aires
		Summary	D'Alessandro(f.k.) 58'	Stadium: Estadio José Amalfitani; Attendance: 28,000; Referee: Horacio Elizondo

27 March 2002 Round 9	River Plate	1–0	Independiente	Buenos Aires
	Zelaye(o.g.) 11'	Summary		Stadium: Estadio Monumental Antonio Vespucio Liberti; Attendance: 30,000; Referee: Héctor Baldassi

31 March 2002 Round 10	Newell's	1–0	River Plate	Rosario
	Rodríguez 37'	Summary		Stadium: Estadio Marcelo Bielsa; Attendance: 35,000; Referee: Daniel Gimenez

3 April 2002 Round 11	River Plate	2–1	Belgrano	Buenos Aires
	Cambiasso 30'; D'Alessandro(p) 84'		Obolo 4'	Stadium: Estadio Monumental Antonio Vespucio Liberti; Attendance: 10,000; Referee: Claudio Martín

7 April 2002 Round 12	San Lorenzo	0–0	River Plate	Buenos Aires
		Summary		Stadium: Estadio Pedro Bidegain; Attendance: 22,000; Referee: Horacio Elizondo

14 April 2002 Round 13	River Plate	4–2	Colón	Buenos Aires
	Cavenaghi 12' 47'; Ortega 51' 89'	Summary	J. Delgado 25'; Castagno Suárez 68'	Stadium: Estadio Monumental Antonio Vespucio Liberti; Attendance: 18,660; Referee: Claudio Martín

17 April 2002 Round 14	Gimnasia (La Plata)	0–1	River Plate	La Plata
		Summary	Cavenaghi 85'	Stadium: Estadio Juan Carmelo Zerillo; Attendance: 29,000; Referee: Ángel Sánchez

21 April 2002 Round 15	River Plate	2–2	Chacarita Juniors	Buenos Aires
	Husaín 53'; Coudet 72'	Summary	Ariel Rosada 17' 86'	Stadium: Estadio Monumental Antonio Vespucio Liberti; Attendance: 26,000; Referee: Claudio Martín

28 April 2002 Round 16	River Plate	1–0	Racing Club	Buenos Aires
	Cuevas 92'	Summary		Stadium: Estadio Monumental Antonio Vespucio Liberti; Attendance: 42,800; Referee: Daniel Giménez

5 May 2002 Round 17	Lanús	1–0	River Plate	Lanús
	Romero 45'	Summary		Stadium: Estadio Ciudad de Lanús – Néstor Díaz Pérez; Attendance: 28,000; Referee: Héctor Baldassi

12 May 2002 Round 18	River Plate	5–1	Argentinos Juniors	Buenos Aires
	Cambiasso 22'; Domínguez 33'; Cavenaghi 38' 45' 59'	Summary	Pisculichi 12'	Stadium: Estadio Monumental Antonio Vespucio Liberti; Attendance: 60,000; Referee: Horacio Elizondo

19 May 2002 Round 19	Rosario Central	2–3	River Plate	Rosario
	Arias 41'; Figueroa 43'	Summary	Domínguez 1'; Zapata 31'; Cavenaghi(p) 70'	Stadium: Estadio Gigante de Arroyito; Attendance: 28,000; Referee: Rafael Furchi

==== League table ====
Pos	Team	Pld	W	D	L	GF	GA	GD	Pts
1	River Plate	19	13	4	2	39	13	+26	43
2	Gimnasia y Esgrima (LP)	19	11	4	4	33	23	+10	37
3	Boca Juniors	19	10	5	4	25	17	+8	35
4	Huracán	19	9	3	7	27	14	+13	30
5	Banfield	19	8	6	5	21	19	+2	30

=== Copa Mercosur 2001 ===
==== Group E ====
Pos	Team	Pld	W	D	L	GF	GA	GD	Pts	Qualification	(Brazil) GRE	(Argentina) RIV	(Brazil) PAL	(Chile) UNI
1	(Brazil) Grêmio	6	4	2	0	11	4	+7	14	Advance to Quarterfinals	—	1–0	3–1	2–0
2	(Argentina) River Plate	6	2	2	2	13	10	+3	8		2–4	—	3–3	3–0
3	(Brazil) Palmeiras	6	1	3	2	11	10	+1	6		0–0	2–2	—	4–0
4	Universidad de Chile	6	1	1	4	3	14	−11	4		1–1	0–3	2–1	—

Source: RSSSF.com

Pos	Grp	Team	Pld	W	D	L	GF	GA	GD	Pts	Qualification
1	B	(Argentina) San Lorenzo	6	3	1	2	9	4	+5	10	Advance to Quarterfinals
2	C	(Argentina) Independiente	6	3	0	3	8	8	0	9	Advance to Quarterfinals
3	A	(Chile) Universidad Católica	6	3	0	3	8	9	−1	9	Advance to Quarterfinals
4	E	(Argentina) River Plate	6	2	2	2	13	10	+3	8	
5	D	(Argentina) Vélez Sársfield	6	2	2	2	12	11	+1	8	

Source: RSSSF

At the 2001 Copa Mercosur, River Plate was eliminated in the group stage.

==== Fixtures and results ====
22 July 2001 Round 1	River Plate (Argentina)	2–4	(Brazil) Grêmio	Buenos Aires
	Cambiasso 34'; Ortega 86'	Summary	Anderson Lima 8'; Tinga 54'; Anderson Polga 80'; Zinho 89'	Stadium: Estadio Monumental Antonio Vespucio Liberti; Attendance: 18,000; Referee: Carlos Torres (Paraguay)

28 July 2001 Round 2	Palmeiras (Brazil)	2–2	(Argentina) River Plate	São Paulo
	Muñoz 10'; Lopes 28'	Summary	Garcé 53'; Cardetti 85'	Stadium: Estádio Palestra Itália; Attendance: 6,000; Referee: Carlos Amarilla (Paraguay)

13 September 2001 Round 3	Grêmio (Brazil)	1–0	(Argentina) River Plate	Porto Alegre
	Zinho 50'	Summary		Stadium: Estádio Olímpico Monumental; Attendance: 3,000; Referee: Epifanio González (Paraguay)

20 September 2001 Round 4	Universidad de Chile	0–3	(Argentina) River Plate	Santiago
		Summary	Cavenaghi 21' 48'; Álvarez 51'	Stadium: Estadio Nacional; Attendance: 9,000; Referee: E. Zambrano (Ecuador)

26 September 2001 Round 5	River Plate (Argentina)	3–3	(Brazil) Palmeiras	Buenos Aires
	Cardetti 36' 38'; Álvarez 51'	Summary	Lopes 48'(p); Basílio 63'; Magrão 88'	Stadium: Estadio Monumental Antonio Vespucio Liberti; Referee: Carlos Chandía (Chile)

16 October 2001 Round 6	River Plate (Argentina)	3–0	Universidad de Chile	Buenos Aires
	Yepes 26' 46'; Álvarez 88'	Summary		Stadium: Estadio Monumental Antonio Vespucio Liberti; Attendance: 3,222; Referee: Saúl Feldman (Uruguay)

=== Copa Libertadores 2002 ===
==== Group 7 ====
Pos	Team	Pld	W	D	L	GF	GA	GD	Pts
1	(Mexico) América	6	5	1	0	9	2	+7	16
2	(Argentina) River Plate	6	2	3	1	8	4	+4	9
3	(Argentina) Talleres	6	1	2	3	5	9	−4	5
4	(Colombia) Tuluá	6	1	0	5	9	16	−7	3

==== Round of 16 ====
Team 1	Agg.	Team 2	1st leg	2nd leg
River Plate (Argentina)	1–6	(Brazil) Grêmio	1–2	0–4

At the 2002 Copa Libertadores, River Plate was eliminated in the Round of 16.

==== Fixture and results ====
14 February 2002 Round 1	River Plate (Argentina)	0–0	(Argentina) Talleres	Buenos Aires
		Summary		Stadium: Estadio Monumental Antonio Vespucio Liberti; Attendance: 7,000; Referee: Sergio Pezzotta (Argentina)

28 February 2002 Round 2	River Plate (Argentina)	0–1	(Mexico) América	Buenos Aires
		Summary	Oviedo 21'	Stadium: Estadio Monumental Antonio Vespucio Liberti; Attendance: 12,500; Referee: Edilson Pereira (Brazil)

7 March 2002 Round 3	River Plate (Argentina)	2–0	(Colombia) Cortuluá	Buenos Aires
	Cambiasso 21'; Esnáider 85'	Report		Stadium: Estadio Monumental Antonio Vespucio Liberti; Attendance: 10,000; Referee: Wilson Souza (Brazil)

13 March 2002 Round 4	América (Mexico)	0–0	(Argentina) River Plate	Mexico City
		Summary		Stadium: Estadio Azteca; Attendance: 95,000; Referee: Oscar Ruiz (Colombia)

21 March 2002 Round 5	Cortuluá (Colombia)	2–5	(Argentina) River Plate	Pereira
	Posada 47'; Ferreira 79'		Domínguez 8' 60'; Lequi 37'; Ortega 55'; Demichelis 71'	Stadium: Estadio Hernán Ramírez Villegas; Attendance: 10,000; Referee: Eduardo Lecca (Peru)

11 April 2002 Round 6	Talleres (Argentina)	1–1	(Argentina) River Plate	Córdoba
	Astudillo 86'	Summary	Escudero 52'	Stadium: Estadio Mario Alberto Kempes; Attendance: 2,500; Referee: Fabián Madorrán (Argentina)

24 April 2002 Round of 16	River Plate (Argentina)	1–2	(Brazil) Grêmio	Buenos Aires
	Coudet 46'	Summary	Tinga 57'; Gilberto 90'	Stadium: Estadio Monumental Antonio Vespucio Liberti; Attendance: 11,000; Referee: Carlos Amarilla (Paraguay)

2 May 2002 Round of 16	Grêmio (Brazil)	4–0	(Argentina) River Plate	Porto Alegre
	Mendes 40'; Luizão 45'; Zinho 69'; Luís Mário 76'	Summary		Stadium: Estádio Olímpico Monumental; Attendance: 50,000; Referee: Oscar Ruiz (Colombia)

== Player statistics ==
=== Appearances and goals ===
No.	Pos	Nat	Player	Total		2001–02 Argentine Primera División		2001 Copa Mercosur		2002 Copa Libertadores	
No.	Pos	Nat	Player	Apps	Goals	Apps	Goals	Apps	Goals	Apps	Goals
12	GK	(Argentina) ARG	Angel Comizzo	44	0	35	0	2	0	7	0
31	GK	(Argentina) ARG	Germán Lux	4	0	3	0	0	0	1	0
1	GK	(Argentina) ARG	Franco Costanzo	5	0	0	0	5	0	0	0
14	DF	(Argentina) ARG	Ariel Garcé	41	1	35	0	3	1	3	0
2	DF	(Paraguay) PAR	Celso Ayala	38	1	27	1	5	0	6	0
21	DF	(Paraguay) PAR	Ricardo Ismael Rojas	33	1	24	1	4	0	5	0
3	DF	(Argentina) ARG	Matías Lequi	26	1	20	0	0	0	6	1
26	DF	(Argentina) ARG	Martín Demichelis	24	1	17	0	1	0	6	1
6	DF	(Colombia) COL	Mario Yepes	17	4	14	2	3	2	0	0
4	DF	(Argentina) ARG	Gustavo Lombardi	9	0	5	0	4	0	0	0
16	DF	(Paraguay) PAR	Pedro Sarabia	9	0	2	0	3	0	4	0
25	DF	(Chile) CHI	Alejandro Escalona	2	0	1	0	0	0	1	0
19	MF	(Argentina) ARG	Esteban Cambiasso	46	14	37	12	3	1	6	1
11	MF	(Argentina) ARG	Andrés D'Alessandro	47	9	36	9	5	0	6	0
8	MF	(Argentina) ARG	Eduardo Coudet	39	5	32	4	1	0	6	1
10	MF	(Argentina) ARG	Ariel Ortega	39	16	29	14	4	1	6	1
23	MF	(Argentina) ARG	Cristian Raúl Ledesma	38	0	27	0	4	0	7	0
22	MF	(Argentina) ARG	Víctor Zapata	35	1	26	1	3	0	6	0
15	MF	(Argentina) ARG	Guillermo Pereyra	25	1	19	1	3	0	3	0
13	MF	(Argentina) ARG	Ariel Franco	23	0	15	0	3	0	5	0
4	MF	(Argentina) ARG	Claudio Husaín	19	1	12	1	0	0	7	0
18	MF	(Argentina) ARG	Damián Ariel Álvarez	15	5	11	2	4	3	0	0
27	MF	(Argentina) ARG	Marcelo Escudero	13	1	7	0	4	0	2	1
5	MF	(Argentina) ARG	Leonardo Astrada	9	0	5	0	2	0	2	0
20	MF	(Argentina) ARG	Juan Pablo Raponi	7	0	4	0	3	0	0	0
28	MF	(Argentina) ARG	Andrés Aimar	2	0	2	0	0	0	0	0
34	MF	(Argentina) ARG	Emiliano Díaz	1	0	1	0	0	0	0	0
	MF	(Argentina) ARG	Daniel Ludueña	1	0	1	0	0	0	0	0
30	FW	(Argentina) ARG	Fernando Cavenaghi	28	19	23	17	2	2	3	0
9	FW	(Argentina) ARG	Martín Cardetti	23	20	19	17	4	3	0	0
7	FW	(Argentina) ARG	Maxi López	19	1	17	1	2	0	0	0
18	FW	(Argentina) ARG	Juan Esnáider	14	1	9	0	0	0	5	1
24	FW	(Paraguay) PAR	Nelson Cuevas	9	1	6	1	3	0	0	0
35	FW	(Argentina) ARG	Alejandro Damián Domínguez	9	4	2	2	0	0	7	2
	FW	(Argentina) ARG	Adrián Roberto Romero	1	0	0	0	1	0	0	0
20	FW	(Uruguay) URU	Daniel Fonseca	2	0	0	0	0	0	2	0
