= Claudio Husaín =

Argentine footballer

Personal information
- Full name: Claudio Daniel Husaín
- Date of birth: 20 November 1974 (age 52)
- Place of birth: San Justo, Argentina
- Height: 1.78 m (5 ft 10 in)
- Position: Midfielder

Youth career
- 1984–1992: Vélez Sársfield

Senior career*
Years	Team	Apps	(Gls)
1993–2000	Vélez Sársfield	153	(5)
2000	Parma	0	(0)
2000	→ River Plate (loan)	9	(0)
2000–2002	Napoli	30	(0)
2002	→ River Plate (loan)	12	(1)
2002	Napoli	14	(1)
2003–2004	River Plate	24	(2)
2004–2005	Tigres UANL	16	(2)
2005–2006	Newell's Old Boys	23	(1)
2006	→ San Lorenzo (loan)	16	(0)
2007–2008	Newell's Old Boys	27	(0)
2009	Defensor Sporting	6	(0)
2010	Audax Italiano	2	(0)
Total		328	(12)

International career
1991	Argentina U17	6	(0)
1992	Argentina U20	1	(0)
1995	Argentina U23	1	(0)
1997–2002	Argentina	14	(1)
Medal record
Representing Argentina
Winner	Pan American Games	1995
Third place	FIFA U-17 World Cup	1991
- * Club domestic league appearances and goals

Claudio Daniel Husaín (born 20 November 1974) is an Argentine former professional footballer who played as a midfielder.

Husaín played for Vélez Sársfield and River Plate in Argentina, Napoli in Italy, and Tigres UANL in Mexico, before returning to Argentina to Newell's Old Boys.

== Club career ==
=== Parma, Napoli and River Plate ===
In 2000, Husaín was signed by Parma, with Mayer Candelo going the other way.

But the club had unpaid debt of Hernán Crespo's transfer fees to River Plate (the 10% clause of future transfer revenue), he was loaned to River Plate along with Ariel Ortega, who was sold outright for 11 billion lire.

On 27 October 2000, he moved back to Italy to play for Napoli, which was later revealed to be a temporary deal. Despite Napoli's relegation, in June 2001 Parma sold him for 21.9 billion lire (around €11.3 million). (Note: La Gazzetta dello Sport (and Rai Sport) reported it was a co-ownership deal in 2000 for 15 billion lire. However his name was not shown on official Lega Calcio co-ownership resolutions and Parma documented the 21.9 billion lire in 2001–2002 financial year.) (in Italian)

Husaín remained at Naples but in January 2002 left for River Plate on loan. He played another half Serie B season at Napoli before returned to River Plate again in January 2003. It was reported that Napoli had a debt of US$1.2million to River Plate, and allowed Husaín to join River Plate for US$300,000 to compensate the debt and to save salary cost. He was injured in June 2003.

=== Tigres UANL ===
In July 2004, he left for Mexican side Tigres UANL.

=== Newell's Old Boys ===
Husaín joined Newell's Old Boys in July 2004. After a half season at San Lorenzo, Husaín returned to Newell's Old Boys again on one-year loan in January 2007.

=== Defensor Sporting ===
In August 2009, he was signed by Uruguayan side Defensor Sporting.

=== Audax Italiano ===
In January 2010 Husaín signed for Chilean club Audax Italiano, but after the February 27 earthquake he decided to leave the team, which effectively put an end to his career.

== International career ==
Husaín represented Argentina at the 2002 FIFA World Cup. He also played at the 1997 Copa América and the 1999 Copa América.

== Personal life ==
His brother Darío Husaín is also a former professional football player.

He was nicknamed El Turco ("The Turk") because of his Lebanese and Syrian descent. In South America, people of Arab descent are traditionally called "Turks" since their ancestors came to the continent with Ottoman documents in the 1900s.

== Career statistics ==
=== International ===
Scores and results list Argentina's goal tally first, score column indicates score after each Husaín goal.

#	Date	Venue	Opponent	Score	Result	Competition
1.	15 November 2000	Estadio Nacional, Santiago, Chile	Chile	2–0	2–0	2002 FIFA World Cup qualification

== Honours ==
Husaín has won six Primera Division Argentina titles, three with Vélez and another three with River Plate. He has also won five international titles (although four of them were from one-off games).

Vélez Sársfield

- Argentine Primera División: 1993 (Clausura), 1995 (Apertura), 1996 (Clausura), 1998 (Clausura)
- Copa Libertadores: 1994
- Copa Intercontinental: 1994
- Supercopa Sudamericana: 1996
- Copa Interamericana: 1994
- Recopa Sudamericana: Runner-up 1995, 1997

River Plate

- Argentine Primera División: 2002 (Clausura), 2003 (Clausura), 2004 (Clausura)

Argentina

- South American Under-17 Football Championship: Third place 1991
- FIFA U-17 World Cup: Third place 1991
- Pan American Games: Gold Medalist 1995
