= Ariel Garcé =

Argentine footballer

Personal information
- Full name: Ariel Hernán Garcé
- Date of birth: 14 July 1979 (age 47)
- Place of birth: Tandil, Argentina
- Height: 1.77 m (5 ft 10 in)
- Positions: Centre back; right back

Youth career
- River Plate

Senior career*
Years	Team	Apps	(Gls)
1999–2004	River Plate	98	(0)
2003	→ Morelia (loan)	11	(0)
2004–2005	Colón	23	(1)
2005–2006	Olimpo	15	(0)
2006–2007	Rosario Central	32	(1)
2007–2012	Colón	139	(5)
2012–2013	Argentinos Juniors	31	(0)
2013–2014	Atlético de Rafaela	31	(0)
Total		380	(7)

International career^{‡}
2003–2010	Argentina	4	(0)
- * Club domestic league appearances and goals as of 22:09, 6 August 2011 (UTC) ‡ National team caps and goals as of 18:00, 17 December 2010 (UTC)

Ariel Hernán "Chino" Garcé (born 14 July 1979), is a former Argentine football defender. He played as a central defender or right back in River Plate, Colón de Santa Fe, Olimpo de Bahía Blanca, and Atlético de Rafaela.

== Career ==
=== Club ===
Garcé started his career with River Plate in 1999. He was part of two championship winning squads before moving on loan to Monarcas Morelia in Mexico in 2003. Garcé returned to River Plate in 2004 and helped the club to win the Clausura 2004 tournament.

Garcé then had his first spell with Colón de Santa Fe, before playing for Olimpo de Bahía Blanca and Rosario Central. While at Olimpo, Garcé was banned for 6 months by the Argentine federation after he tested positive of cocaine.

In 2007, he returned for a second spell with Colón.

In 2014, he played for Atlético de Rafaela, finishing his career in that club.

=== International ===
Garcé played two friendly matches under Marcelo Bielsa's coaching for the Argentina national football team in 2003. He then played a friendly against Haiti under Diego Maradona. On 19 May 2010, Garcé was surprisingly selected as one of the 23 men to play for Argentina in the 2010 FIFA World Cup in South Africa though he did not feature in any match. Maradona reportedly had a dream of an Argentina squad winning the World Cup, and the only face he could remember was Garcé's.

== Outside Football ==
He started his auto racing career in 2019. Five years later, he won for the first time at Autódromo Municipal Juan Manuel Fangio, participating in Fiat Competizione, a supporting class of Super TC2000.

== Career statistics ==
=== International ===
Argentina national team
Year	Apps	Goals
2003	2	0
2004	0	0
2005	0	0
2006	0	0
2007	0	0
2008	0	0
2009	0	0
2010	2	0
Total	4	0

== Honours ==
River Plate

- Argentine Primera División (3): Clausura 2000, Clausura 2002, Clausura 2004
