= Víctor Zapata =

Argentine footballer

Personal information
- Full name: Víctor Eduardo Zapata
- Date of birth: 20 January 1979 (age 47)
- Place of birth: San Martín, Buenos Aires, Argentina
- Height: 1.82 m (6 ft 0 in)
- Positions: Central midfielder; left winger

Youth career
- Argentinos Juniors

Senior career*
Years	Team	Apps	(Gls)
1998–1999	Argentinos Juniors	15	(0)
1999–2007	River Plate	192	(15)
2003–2004	→ Real Valladolid (loan)	25	(2)
2007–2012	Vélez Sársfield	140	(9)
2012–2013	Independiente	12	(0)
2013–2014	Union de Santa Fe	16	(0)
2014–2015	Chacarita Juniors	32	(1)

International career
2005–2010	Argentina	2	(0)
- * Club domestic league appearances and goals

Víctor Eduardo Zapata (born 20 January 1979) is an Argentine retired football midfielder. Originally a pacey left winger, Zapata has developed his game as a deep-lying playmaker since his arrival to Vélez in 2007.

== Club career ==
Zapata started his career in 1998 with Argentinos Juniors. In 1999, he moved to River Plate, where he won four league titles during his first spell with the club. During the 2003–04 season, he was loaned to Real Valladolid in the Spanish La Liga, but returned to River after Valladolid was relegated at the end of the season.

In 2007, Zapata joined Vélez Sársfield in a free transfer, after River denied the possibility of extending his contract. He was a regular starter in the team's 2009 Clausura championship, playing 18 of the 19 games (and scoring one goal). He also played 13 games as a starter (1 goal) in Vélez' 2011 Clausura winning campaign, his second Argentine league title with the club and sixth in his career.

== International career ==
Under José Pekerman's coaching, Zapata played a friendly match with the Argentina national team in 2005. The game was a 1–1 draw with Mexico, in which Argentina had a squad formed exclusively by local league players.

== Honours ==
River Plate

- Argentine Primera División (4): 1999 Apertura, 2000 Clausura, 2002 Clausura, 2003 Clausura

Vélez Sársfield

- Argentine Primera División (2): 2009 Clausura, 2011 Clausura
