= Leonardo Astrada =

Argentine footballer and manager

Leo Astrada
Personal information
- Full name: Leonardo Rubén Astrada
- Date of birth: 6 January 1970 (age 56)
- Place of birth: Buenos Aires, Argentina
- Height: 1.73 m (5 ft 8 in)
- Position: Midfielder

Senior career*
Years	Team	Apps	(Gls)
1988–2000	River Plate	297	(6)
2000	Grêmio	6	(0)
2001–2003	River Plate	42	(0)

International career
1991–1999	Argentina	32	(1)

Managerial career
- 2004–2005: River Plate
- 2006: Rosario Central
- 2007–2008: Colón
- 2008–2009: Estudiantes L.P.
- 2009–2010: River Plate
- 2011: Cerro Porteño
- 2012: Argentinos Juniors
- 2014–2015: Cerro Porteño
- 2015: Atlético de Rafaela
- * Club domestic league appearances and goals as of Apr 2015

Leonardo Rubén Astrada (born 6 January 1970) is a retired Argentine footballer, who went on to become a football manager. The last team he managed was Atlético de Rafaela.

== Playing career ==
Astrada was born in Buenos Aires. He played the majority of his career for River Plate, winning ten major titles – making him the second most decorated player in the club's history (after Leonardo Ponzio). He played a total of 405 games for the club in all competitions.

He also played for Brazilian club Grêmio in the year 2000.

In addition, he played for the Argentina national football team and was a participant at the 1998 FIFA World Cup. He made 32 appearances for Argentina scoring 1 goal.

== Managerial career ==
After retirement in January 2004, he was appointed as manager for River Plate, and lasted one and a half years in the job.

In October 2005 he became the manager of Rosario Central, but He didn't have a good relationship with the board, and quickly quit his position. During the 2007–08 season he coached Colón but left his position in March 2008.

After an unsuccessful stint with Estudiantes de La Plata between 2008 and on 6 October 2009 River Plate officials have hired the coach to replace Néstor Gorosito, who recently quit after the 1–2 defeat against San Lorenzo. Astrada already managed River in the 2004–2005 season. In 2015, Astrada signed a contract with Atlético de Rafaela until the end of the season in the Argentinian first division.

== Honours ==
=== Player ===
River Plate

- Argentine Primera División (10): 1989–90, 1991 Apertura, 1993 Apertura, 1994 Apertura, 1996 Apertura, 1997 Clausura, 1997 Apertura, 1999 Apertura, 2002 Clausura, 2003 Clausura
- Copa Libertadores (1): 1996
- Supercopa Sudamericana (1): 1997

Argentina

- Copa América (1): 1991

=== Individual ===
- South American Team of the Year: 1991, 1997

=== Manager ===
River Plate

- Argentine Primera División (1): 2004 Clausura
