= Diego Barrado =

Argentine footballer and manager (born 1981)

Personal information
- Full name: Diego Armando Barrado
- Date of birth: 27 February 1981 (age 45)
- Place of birth: Bragado, Argentina
- Height: 1.77 m (5 ft 10 in)
- Position: Midfielder

Team information
- Current team: Atlético Tucumán (reserves manager)

Youth career
- Sportivo Barrado

Senior career*
Years	Team	Apps	(Gls)
2000–2010	River Plate	72	(5)
2004–2005	→ Racing Club (loan)	29	(5)
2006–2007	→ Colón (loan)	33	(0)
2007–2008	→ Olimpo (loan)	28	(3)
2011–2014	Atlético Tucumán	122	(0)
2014–2015	Boca Unidos	32	(0)
2015–2018	Juventud Unida (G)	78	(2)

Managerial career
- 2024–: Atlético Tucumán (reserves)
- 2024: Atlético Tucumán (interim)
- * Club domestic league appearances and goals

Diego Armando Barrado (born 27 February 1981) is an Argentine football manager and former player who played as a midfielder. He is the current manager of Atlético Tucumán's reserve team.

== Career ==
Barrado spent time in the youth teams of River Plate and Textil Mandiyú and made his professional debut for River in 2000. In 2004, he joined Racing Club de Avellaneda where he excelled in several games. In 2005, he returned to River Plate, but played very little. In 2006, he was signed by Colón de Santa Fe by manager Leonardo Astrada, Barrado's former teammate and manager at River. However, his level again declined.

In 2007, he joined Olimpo where he played well for the team despite their relegation from the league. He again returned to River but was part of the worst season ever for the club, where they finished 20th and last for the first time in the history of the club.
