= Ángel Comizzo =

Argentine footballer and manager

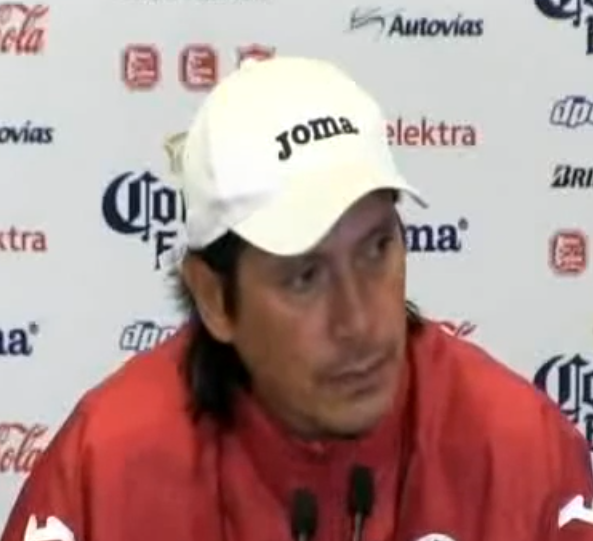
- Comizzo in 2014

Personal information
- Full name: Ángel David Comizzo Leiva
- Date of birth: 27 April 1962 (age 64)
- Place of birth: Reconquista, Santa Fe, Argentina
- Height: 1.85 m (6 ft 1 in)
- Position: Goalkeeper

Youth career
- 1977–1981: Racing Reconquista

Senior career*
Years	Team	Apps	(Gls)
1982–1988	Talleres	77	(0)
1988–1993	River Plate	130	(0)
1990–1991	→ Tigres (loan)	35	(0)
1993	América de Cali	10	(0)
1993–1996	Banfield	98	(0)
1996–1999	León	76	(0)
1999–2001	Morelia	69	(0)
2001–2003	River Plate	50	(0)
2003–2004	Atlético Rafaela	24	(0)
Total		596	(0)

Managerial career
- 2008: Talleres
- 2010: Querétaro
- 2012: Querétaro
- 2013–2014: Universitario
- 2014: Morelia
- 2016: Universidad Cesar Vallejo
- 2019: Universitario
- 2020–2021: Universitario
- 2023: Deportivo Municipal
- 2023–2026: Atlético Grau
- * Club domestic league appearances and goals

Ángel David Comizzo Leiva (born 27 April 1962) is an Argentine football manager and former player who played as a goalkeeper.

Comizzo was born in Reconquista, and began his career at Talleres in the Primera Division Argentina. In 1988, he joined River Plate where he was loaned to UANL Tigres of Mexico in 1990–1991. In 1993, he moved to América de Cali in Colombia, but after a very poor performance, he returned to Argentina later that year to play for Club Atlético Banfield.

In 1996, he joined Club León in Mexico, and in 1999 he moved to team Morelia in time to be part of a championship club. In 2001 Comizzo returned to River Plate, and in 2003 he joined Atlético Rafaela where he retired from football in 2004.

In September 2009, Angel Comizzo was brought in by Carlos Reinoso to be his assistant manager for Querétaro FC. Comizzo was a huge part of Reinoso's Leon in 1997 when they lost the final against Cruz Azul in Extra Time with a golden goal.

== World Cup 1990 ==
When Nery Pumpido was injured in Argentina's second match at the 1990 World Cup finals, Comizzo was brought into the squad as a replacement. He did not actually play in any of the team's subsequent matches in the tournament.

== Curse of Leon and Cruz Azul ==
It is said that Comizzo cursed Leon and Cruz Azul during the final of 97 by kicking Carlos Hermosillo at the last minute and causing a penalty kick that made them lose the final.

== Honours ==
=== Player ===
==== Club ====
River Plate

- Argentine Primera División: 1989–90, 1991 Apertura, 2002 Clausura, 2003 Clausura

Morelia

- Liga MX: Invierno 2000

==== International ====
Argentina

- FIFA World Cup Runner-up: 1990

=== Manager ===
Universitario de Deportes

- Primera División de Peru: 2013
- Torneo Apertura 2020

Morelia

- Supercopa MX: 2014
