= Fabián Madorrán =

Argentine football referee (1965–2004)

- Full name: Fabián Hugo Madorrán
- Born: 29 June 1965; Remedios de Escalada, Argentina
- Died: 30 July 2004 (aged 39); Córdoba, Argentina

Domestic
Years	League	Role
1997–2003	Argentine Primera División	Referee

International
Years	League	

Fabián Hugo Madorrán (29 June 1965 – 30 July 2004) was an Argentine football referee who officiated in the Argentine Primera División between 1997 and 2003. He became an international referee in 1998 and officiated 166 matches in Argentina's top division. His career included several disputed refereeing decisions and disciplinary suspensions. In September 2003, the Argentine Football Association (AFA) declined to renew his contract, prompting a legal dispute between Madorrán and the association.

== Refereeing career ==
Madorrán was born on 29 June 1965 in Remedios de Escalada, Buenos Aires Province. He began refereeing local football matches as a teenager and joined the professional refereeing ranks in 1997. During his six seasons in the Primera División, he officiated 166 matches and sent off 153 players.

In February 1998, during his first international assignment, Madorrán sent off four Brazilian players in an under-20 match against Uruguay in Punta del Este. In April 1999, he was suspended after awarding two disputed penalties to San Lorenzo in a match against Estudiantes de La Plata.

He faced further disciplinary action in 2001 following the first leg of a promotion play-off between Instituto and Argentinos Juniors. Madorrán disallowed two goals by Argentinos Juniors and sent off two of the team's players. The refereeing authorities subsequently suspended him for three matches. Argentinos Juniors president Oscar Giménez also called for his removal from the AFA's refereeing staff.

Other disputed decisions occurred during promotion play-offs in 2002 and 2003. In 2002, he sent off four players from Gimnasia y Esgrima de Concepción del Uruguay during a match against Unión. The following year, he allowed a goal by Claudio González for Talleres against San Martín de Mendoza despite an offside infringement.

Madorrán also attracted criticism for his conduct outside refereeing decisions. During a match involving Boca Juniors and Almagro in March 2001, television cameras showed him singing along with Boca supporters. He later explained that he had joined in because he found the song catchy.

== Dismissal and legal dispute ==
On 29 September 2003, the AFA announced that it would not renew Madorrán's contract. His final match had been Chacarita Juniors' 3–0 defeat to Banfield in the Apertura championship. The association cited physical fitness and technical evaluations as grounds for the decision. Four other referees, Roberto Ruscio, Juan Carlos Rodríguez Rojas, Marcelo López and Héctor Boxler, were also released.

Guillermo Marconi, president of the referees' union SADRA, said the organization would review the reasons for Madorrán's dismissal before deciding whether to support an appeal. Madorrán disputed the decision and sought financial compensation from the AFA. He also publicly criticized the association and suggested that he could disclose information about its internal affairs.

He subsequently initiated legal proceedings against the AFA. The dispute remained unresolved at the time of his death.

== Later life and death ==
After leaving professional refereeing, Madorrán moved to Córdoba in 2004. He planned to establish an internet café and was considering work in sports journalism, including radio and television.

On 30 July 2004, Madorrán died by suicide in Parque Sarmiento, Córdoba, aged 39. He left a farewell letter addressed to his friend Jorge Videla, who told reporters that Madorrán had been experiencing financial difficulties, including the loss of money intended for his planned business. His lawyer, Juan Mario Spirópulos, stated that Madorrán had been struggling financially and emotionally following his dismissal from the AFA.
