= Gustavo Lombardi =

Argentine footballer

Personal information
- Full name: Gustavo Adrián Lombardi
- Date of birth: 10 September 1975 (age 51)
- Place of birth: Rosario, Argentina
- Position: Defender

Senior career*
Years	Team	Apps	(Gls)
1994–1997	River Plate	35	(0)
1997–1998	UD Salamanca	8	(0)
1998–1999	Middlesbrough	0	(0)
1999–2001	River Plate	60	(0)
2002	Deportivo Alavés	6	(0)

International career
1991	Argentina U17	6	(0)
1995	Argentina U20	6	(0)
1997	Argentina	2	(0)
- * Club domestic league appearances and goals

Gustavo Adrián Lombardi (born 10 September 1975) is an Argentine retired professional footballer who played in Argentina for River Plate, in Spain for UD Salamanca and Deportivo Alavés, and in England for Middlesbrough.

He also played for the Argentina under-20 side at the 1995 FIFA World Youth Championship, as well as for the full Argentina national side.
