= Juan Pablo Raponi =

Argentine footballer

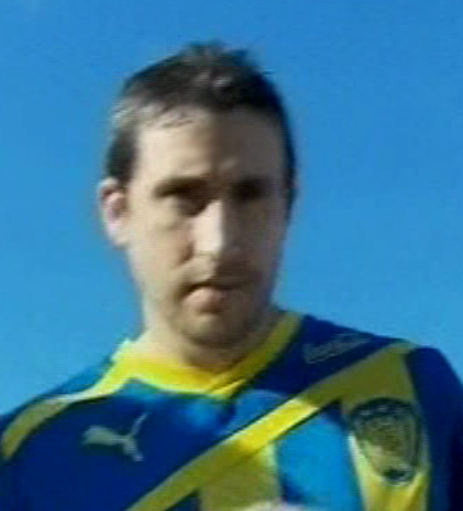
- Raponi with Sportivo Luqueño in 2012.

Personal information
- Full name: Juan Pablo Raponi
- Date of birth: May 7, 1982 (age 44)
- Place of birth: Álvarez, Argentina
- Height: 1.77 m (5 ft 10 in)
- Position: Midfielder

Youth career
- River Plate

Senior career*
Years	Team	Apps	(Gls)
2001–2002	River Plate	5	(0)
2002–2003	Universidad de Chile	8	(0)
2003–2004	Banfield	20	(1)
2004	Olimpo	12	(1)
2004–2005	Oxford United	10	(0)
2005–2006	Instituto	13	(0)
2006–2007	Ponferradina	37	(7)
2007–2008	Racing de Ferrol	14	(0)
2008–2009	Lorca Deportiva	52	(8)
2009	Emelec	8	(0)
2010–2011	Ferro Carril Oeste	11	(0)
2011–2013	Sportivo Luqueño	84	(2)
2014	3 de Febrero	18	(2)
2015	Sol de América	20	(2)
2016	Gimnasia de Mendoza	8	(0)
2016–2017	Concepción	23	(2)
2017–2018	Desamparados	19	(0)
2019	Chabás	–	(–)
2020	Independiente Bigand	–	(–)
2021–2022	Unión de Álvarez	5	(0)
Total		367	(25)
- * Club domestic league appearances and goals

Juan Pablo Raponi (born May 7, 1982, in Álvarez) is a former Argentine footballer who played as a midfielder. He is nicknamed "Cachete".

== Career ==
Raponi started his career with River Plate in 2001 under manager Ramón Díaz. After playing for several clubs in Argentina and Chile he was reunited with Díaz at Oxford United at the 4th level of English football. Díaz's time at Oxford was not very successful and he left in 2005, Raponi also returned to Argentina to play for Instituto. He then went on to play for Ponferradina and Racing de Ferrol in Spain. He played for Ecuadorian side Emelec during the late half of 2009.

In 2010, Raponi returned to Argentina by joining second division side Ferro Carril Oeste.
