= Federico Astudillo =

Argentine footballer

Personal information
- Date of birth: January 6, 1981 (age 45)
- Place of birth: Jesús María, Argentina
- Position: Forward

Senior career*
Years	Team	Apps	(Gls)
2000–2002	Talleres de Córdoba	20	(5)
2002	→ Cartagena CF (loan)	6	(1)
2003	Chacarita Juniors	10	(1)
2003–2004	Oriente Petrolero	26	(10)
2004	León	18	(5)
2005	Racing de Córdoba	19	(5)
2006	Oriente Petrolero	13	(5)
2007	Juventud Antoniana	7	(0)
2007–2008	Sportivo Patria	4	(0)
2009–2010	Real Arroyo Seco	11	(3)
2010	Central Córdoba	13	(3)
2011–2012	Sportivo Italiano	58	(9)
2012–2013	La Emilia	10	(3)
Total		236	(61)
Medal record
Second place	Bolivian Primera División	2004
First place	Ascenso MX	2004
- * Club domestic league appearances and goals

Federico Astudillo (born January 6, 1981) is an Argentine former association football forward who played in Bolivia, Spain and Mexico as well as in his native country.
