= Martín Vitali =

Argentine footballer

Personal information
- Full name: Martín Ariel Vitali
- Date of birth: November 11, 1975 (age 50)
- Place of birth: Moreno, Buenos Aires, Argentina
- Height: 1.69 m (5 ft 7 in)
- Position: Defender

Youth career
- Ferro Carril Oeste

Senior career*
Years	Team	Apps	(Gls)
1996–2000	Ferro Carril Oeste	94	(0)
2000–2001	Independiente	35	(1)
2001–2003	Racing Club	58	(0)
2003–2004	CD Leganés	32	(0)
2004–2005	Getafe CF	2	(0)
2005–2007	Racing Club	21	(0)
2007–2008	Nueva Chicago	30	(2)
2008–2010	APOP Kinyras Peyias	50	(2)
- * Club domestic league appearances and goals

Martín Ariel Vitali (born 11 November 1975 in Moreno) is an Argentine former football defender.

== Career ==
Martín Vitali debuted professionally with Ferro Carril Oeste in a game against San Lorenzo in 1996. After descending with Ferro Carril Oeste, Vitali went through Independiente in season 2000-01 and, for the upcoming season, he joined Racing Club. With the academy won the Torneo Apertura 2001 thus cutting off a streak of 35 years without national titles for the club. Vitali also played in Spain, defending the colors of the CD Leganés and Getafe CF between 2003 and 2005 until he returned to Racing for the Torneo Clausura 2005. After a long injury, returned to the first of Racing Club on April 29, 2007, in a game of the reserves, against Boca Juniors.

== Honours ==
APOP Kinyras

- Cypriot Cup: 2008–09
