= Álvarez, Argentina =

Álvarez
- Town
- Location of Álvarez in Argentina
- Coordinates: 33°8′S 60°48′W
- Country: Argentina
- Province: Santa Fe
- Department: Rosario
- Elevation: 56 m (184 ft)

Population
  - Total: 5,515
- Time zone: UTC−3 (ART)
- CPA base: S2107
- Dialing code: +54 3402

Álvarez is a town (comuna) in the province of Santa Fe, Argentina. It has 5,515 inhabitants as per the 2001 census [INDEC].

The town was founded on 7 July 1890 by Justina Rodríguez, the young widow of Nicolás María Álvarez, the owner of an estancia (ranch) surrounded by a small populated settlement. It was first managed by her son Bernardino, until 1902, when an administrative commission was formally appointed by the provincial governor.
