= Leonardo Torres =

Argentine footballer (born 1975)

Personal information
- Full name: César Leonardo Torres
- Date of birth: 27 October 1975 (age 51)
- Place of birth: Córdoba, Argentina
- Height: 1.70 m (5 ft 7 in)
- Position: Midfielder

Senior career*
Years	Team	Apps	(Gls)
1994–2000	Belgrano		
2001	Jeonbuk Hyundai Motors	3	(0)
2001–2002	Racing Club	25	(2)
2002–2003	Unión de Santa Fe	30	(1)
2003–2004	Godoy Cruz	37	(12)
2004–2005	Belgrano		
2005	San Martín SJ	10	(2)
2006	Universidad Católica	6	(0)
2006–2007	Racing de Córdoba	21	(3)
2007	Estudiantes Río Cuarto	8	(2)
2008–2010	Deportivo Maipú	65	(6)
2010	Flor de Ceibo		
- * Club domestic league appearances and goals

César Leonardo Torres (born 27 October 1975 in Córdoba) is an Argentine retired football midfielder.

== Career ==
Torres began his career with Belgrano de Córdoba and has played for several clubs in Argentina including Racing Club de Avellaneda and Unión de Santa Fe. Torres also had a brief stint playing with Jeonbuk Hyundai Motors in South Korea.
