= Gabriel Hernán Cela =

Argentine footballer (born 1974)

Gabriel Cela Ruggieri
Personal information
- Full name: Gabriel Hernán Cela Ruggieri
- Date of birth: 8 October 1974 (age 52)
- Place of birth: Rosario, Argentina
- Height: 1.82 m (6 ft 0 in)
- Position: Forward

Senior career*
Years	Team	Apps	(Gls)
1996–1997	Central Córdoba Rosario		
1997	Independiente	1	(0)
1998	Deportes Concepción	3	(0)
1998–1999	Central Córdoba Rosario		
1999–2000	All Boys	11	(3)
2000–2001	Cipolletti	11	(2)
2001	Viterbese	2	(1)
2002–2003	Chacarita Juniors	18	(4)
2003	Central Córdoba Rosario	11	(7)
2004	San José	14	(5)
2004	Guillermo Brown	2	(1)
2004	Juventud Antoniana	11	(0)
2005–2006	Barracas Central	6	(2)
2007	Arco Iris	–	(–)
2007–2008	Independiente Neuquén	24	(13)
2010	Centro Patagónico Urología	–	(–)
- * Club domestic league appearances and goals

Gabriel Hernán Cela Ruggieri (born 8 October 1974), frequently named Gabriel Cela Ruggieri, is an Argentine former professional footballer who played as a forward for clubs in Argentina, Bolivia, Chile, and Italy.

== Teams ==
- (Argentina) Central Córdoba (Rosario) 1996–1997
- (Argentina) Independiente 1997
- (Chile) Deportes Concepción 1998
- (Argentina) Central Córdoba (Rosario) 1998–1999
- (Argentina) All Boys 1999–2000
- (Argentina) Cipolletti 2000–2001
- (Italy) Viterbese 2001
- (Argentina) Chacarita Juniors 2002–2003
- (Argentina) Central Córdoba (Rosario) 2003
- (Bolivia) San José 2004
- (Argentina) Guillermo Brown 2004
- (Argentina) Juventud Antoniana 2004
- (Argentina) Barracas Central 2005–2006
- (Argentina) Arco Iris Virgen Misionera 2007
- (Argentina) Independiente de Neuquén 2007–2008
- (Argentina) Centro Patagónico de Urología 2010
