= Germán Real =

Argentine footballer (born 1976)

Personal information
- Full name: Germán Gonzalo Real
- Date of birth: 17 April 1976 (age 50)
- Place of birth: Rosario, Argentina
- Height: 1.75 m (5 ft 9 in)
- Position: Striker

Youth career
- Newell's Old Boys

Senior career*
Years	Team	Apps	(Gls)
1996–2001	Newell's Old Boys	94	(28)
1997–1998	→ Central Córdoba (loan)	38	(21)
2001–2002	Banfield	6	(0)
2002–2003	Talleres	29	(9)
2003	Ionikos	8	(1)
2004	Unión Santa Fe	15	(4)
2004–2005	Colo-Colo	30	(6)
2005–2006	Blooming	40	(8)
2006	Deportivo Quito	11	(3)
2007	Independiente Rivadavia	24	(6)
2008	Instituto	14	(1)
2008	La Emilia	24	(0)
2009	Unión Sunchales	22	(2)
2009–2010	Central Córdoba	21	(4)
2010–2011	Central Norte	32	(9)
2011	Social Gödeken	–	(–)
2012	Alumni de Casilda	–	(–)
- * Club domestic league appearances and goals

Germán Gonzalo Real (born 17 April 1976) is a retired Argentine footballer who played as a striker. He played for clubs in Argentina, Chile, Bolivia, Ecuador, and Greece.

== Teams ==
- (Argentina) Newell's Old Boys 1994–1997
- (Argentina) Central Córdoba de Rosario 1997–1998
- (Argentina) Newell's Old Boys 1998–2001
- (Argentina) Banfield 2002
- (Argentina) Talleres 2002–2003
- (Greece) Ionikos 2003
- (Argentina) Unión Santa Fe 2004
- (Chile) Colo-Colo 2004–2005
- (Bolivia) Blooming 2005–2006
- (Ecuador) Deportivo Quito 2006
- (Argentina) Talleres 2006
- (Argentina) Independiente Rivadavia 2007
- (Argentina) Instituto 2008
- (Argentina) La Emilia 2008
- (Argentina) Unión Sunchales 2009
- (Argentina) Central Córdoba de Rosario 2009–2010
- (Argentina) Central Norte 2010–2011
- (Argentina) Social Gödeken 2011
- (Argentina) Alumni de Casilda

== Post-retirement ==
Real became a football agent.
