= Horacio Ameli =

Argentine footballer

Personal information
- Full name: Horacio Andrés Ameli
- Date of birth: July 7, 1974 (age 52)
- Place of birth: Rosario, Argentina
- Height: 1.80 m (5 ft 11 in)
- Position: Defender

Senior career*
Years	Team	Apps	(Gls)
1994–1996	Colón		
1996–1998	Rayo Vallecano	60	(2)
1998–2002	San Lorenzo		
2002	Internacional		
2002–2003	São Paulo	13	(1)
2003–2004	River Plate		
2004–2005	América		
2005–2006	Colón		

International career
1996	Argentina U-23		
- * Club domestic league appearances and goals

Horacio Andrés Ameli, better known as Horacio Ameli (born July 7, 1974), is an Argentine former professional football defender, who played in several top-level clubs of countries such as Argentina, Brazil, Mexico and Spain.

== Career ==
Horacio Ameli was born in Rosario. He started his professional career in 1994, defending Colón. He took part in the 1995 Argentine Second Division campaign, helping the coming back to First Division after fourteen years. He became a local idol also by took part in keeping the club in main division by the end of the next season, a difficult task in the promedios system.

In those days, he was called by Argentina U-23 for the 1996 CONMEBOL Pre-Olympic Tournament, although Daniel Passarella chose veterans for the Olympic team defense in the final list to Atlanta.

After leaving for Rayo Vallecano in 1996, he returned to his native country in 1998, to defend San Lorenzo, moving to Brazil in 2002 to defend Internacional. With Inter, he played two Copa do Brasil games in 2002. Ameli then moved to São Paulo in the same year, playing 13 Série A games between 2002 and 2003, and scoring one goal. He returned to Argentina in 2003 to play for River Plate, leaving in the following year to play for Mexican club América.

Horacio Ameli returned again to Argentina in 2005, then retired in 2006, while loaned to Colón.
