= Máximo Lucas =

Uruguayan footballer (born 1979)

Personal information
- Full name: Máximo Francisco Lucas Mattías
- Date of birth: 28 January 1979 (age 47)
- Place of birth: Montevideo, Uruguay
- Height: 1.82 m (6 ft 0 in)
- Position: Centre-back

Senior career*
Years	Team	Apps	(Gls)
1999–2002	Danubio	89	(0)
2003	River Plate	0	(0)
2003–2004	Tecos	47	(1)
2005	Universidad de Chile	12	(1)
2005–2006	Olimpo	17	(0)
2007	Deportivo Cali	8	(0)
2007–2009	Liverpool Montevideo	31	(2)
2009–2010	Marathón	2	(0)
2011	Beijing Baxy	8	(1)
Total		214	(5)
- * Club domestic league appearances and goals

Máximo Francisco Lucas Mattías (born January 28, 1979) is a former Uruguayan footballer who played as a centre-back. He played in clubs of Uruguay, Argentina, Chile, Mexico, Honduras and Colombia.

== Teams ==
- (Uruguay) Danubio 1999–2002
- (Argentina) River Plate 2003
- (Mexico) Tecos 2003–2004
- Universidad de Chile 2005
- (Argentina) Olimpo 2005–2006
- (Colombia) Deportivo Cali 2007
- (Uruguay) Liverpool 2007–2009
- (Honduras) Marathón 2009–2010
- (China) Beijing Baxy 2011

== Titles ==
- Marathon 2009 (Torneo Apertura Liga Nacional de Honduras Championship)
