= Ezequiel Amaya =

Argentine footballer

Personal information
- Full name: Ezequiel Guillermo Jesús Amaya
- Date of birth: 20 February 1978 (age 48)
- Place of birth: Cañada de Gómez, Argentina
- Height: 1.66 m (5 ft 5 1/2 in)
- Position: Midfielder

Team information
- Current team: Off contract

Senior career*
Years	Team	Apps	(Gls)
1996–1997	C.A Independiente U-19		
1997–2001	C.A Independiente		
2001–2003	Nueva Chicago		
2003-2004	C.F. Universidad de Chile		
2004	Al-Sadd		
2005–2006;	C.A Tiro Federal		
2005–2006	Barcelona Sporting Club		
2006–2007	Mineros		
2007–2008	Deportivo Italia		
2008–2009	Bahia		
2008–2009	Club Almagro		
- * Club domestic league appearances and goals as of 8 November 2008

Ezequiel Guillermo Jesús Amaya (born February 20, 1978) is an Argentine footballer, who is currently off contract, after playing for Club Almagro in Primera B Nacional Argentina.

== Biography ==
He has had a career playing all over South America, and even had a short half year stint in the Middle East with Qatar club Al-Sadd.

He was rumoured to be heading to Australia to play for North Queensland Fury in the A-League, but apparently no showed.
