= Guillermo Pereyra =

Argentine footballer

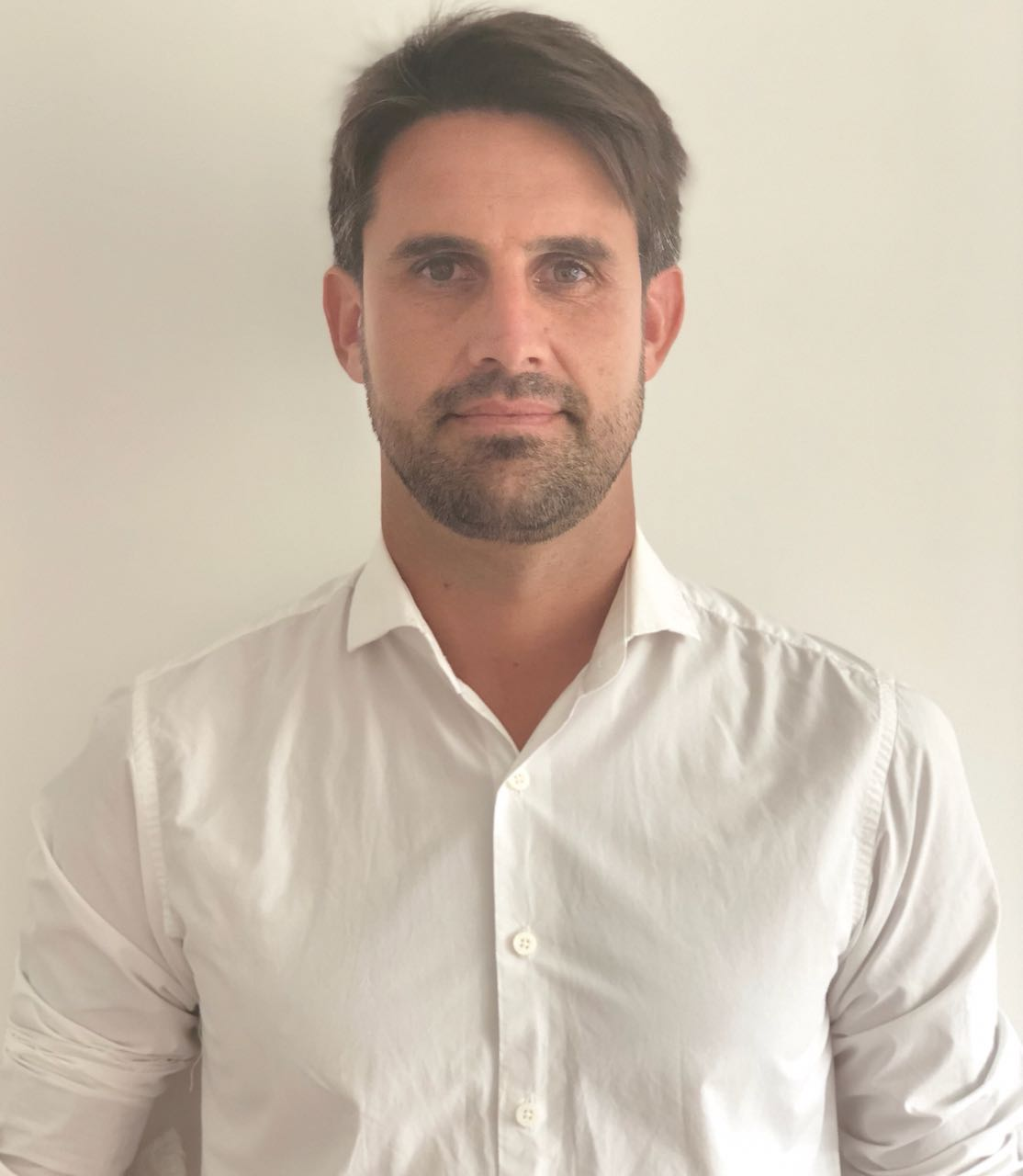
- Guillermo Pereyra

Personal information
- Full name: Guillermo Ariel Pereyra
- Date of birth: 20 February 1980 (age 46)
- Place of birth: Río Cuarto, Argentina
- Height: 1.83 m (6 ft 0 in)
- Position: Defensive midfielder

Youth career
- River Plate

Senior career*
Years	Team	Apps	(Gls)
1998–2003	River Plate	95	(10)
2004–2008	Mallorca	121	(5)
2008	Lokomotiv Moscow	8	(0)
2009	Young Boys	5	(0)
2009–2010	Murcia	20	(1)
2010–2011	San Lorenzo	27	(2)
Total		276	(18)

Managerial career
- 2018–2019: Deportivo Santamarina
- * Club domestic league appearances and goals

Guillermo Ariel Pereyra (born 20 February 1980) is an Argentine retired footballer who played as a defensive midfielder.

He spent most of his 13-year professional career with River Plate and Mallorca, winning four major titles with the former and appearing in 129 competitive games with the latter.

== Football career ==
Born in Río Cuarto, Córdoba, Pereyra began his professional career at Club Atlético River Plate, helping the club to four Primera División titles during his spell there. In January 2004 he was transferred to RCD Mallorca in Spain, eventually becoming an undisputed starter for the La Liga side and making his debut in the competition on 8 February by coming on as a 63rd minute substitute in a 0–3 away loss against Sevilla FC.

In March 2008, Pereyra moved to FC Lokomotiv Moscow, but the Russians decided to terminate the deal shortly after, and he subsequently joined BSC Young Boys on 11 February 2009, initially until the end of the season.

Pereyra returned to Spain in late August 2009, penning a two-year deal with Real Murcia from the second division after arriving on a free transfer. For the following campaign, after the team's relegation, he returned to his country and signed with San Lorenzo de Almagro.

== Personal life ==
He is the older brother of the Argentine footballer Federico Pereyra.

== Honours ==
Season	Club	Title
1999	River Plate	Argentine League Apertura
2000	River Plate	Argentine League Clausura
2002	River Plate	Argentine League Clausura
2003	River Plate	Argentine League Clausura
