= Ángel Sánchez (referee) =

Argentine football referee

- Full name: Ángel Osvaldo Sánchez
- Born: 3 March 1957 (age 69); Argentina
Years		Role
1982–2006		Referee

International
Years	League	Role

Ángel Sánchez (born March 3, 1957) is a former association football referee from Argentina, best known for supervising two matches (South Africa–Slovenia and Portugal–South Korea) during the 2002 FIFA World Cup held in South Korea and Japan. The latter fixture became noted as Sánchez was hit in the stomach by Portuguese forward João Pinto after Sánchez gave Pinto a red card for a tackle on Park Ji-sung, who scored the match's only goal to eliminate Portugal from the group stage.

Sánchez's official first division debut was in 1982; he retired in 2006.
