= Federico Arias =

Argentine footballer (born 1979)

Personal information
- Full name: Federico Andrés Arias
- Date of birth: 24 April 1979 (age 47)
- Place of birth: Rosario, Argentina
- Height: 1.72 m (5 ft 8 in)
- Position: Forward

Youth career
- ADIUR
- Rosario Central

Senior career*
Years	Team	Apps	(Gls)
1998–2002	Rosario Central	62	(6)
2002–2005	Vélez Sársfield	18	(0)
2003	→ Southampton (loan)	0	(0)
2005	Quilmes	5	(0)
2005	Belgrano	11	(1)
2006	Sporting Cristal	15	(2)
2006	Coronel Bolognesi	9	(0)
2007–2008	Martina Franca	10	(0)
2008	Deportes Melipilla	8	(0)
2009	Tiro Federal	3	(0)
2009	Yaracuyanos	9	(0)
2010	Aldosivi	3	(0)

Managerial career
- 2018–2021: Montevideo City Torque (assistant)
- 2021–2022: Chacarita Juniors
- 2024: Independiente Rivadavia (reserves)
- 2024: Independiente Rivadavia (interim)
- * Club domestic league appearances and goals

Federico Andrés Arias (born 24 April 1979) is an Argentine football manager and former player who played as a forward.

== Club career ==
As a youth player, Arias was with ADIUR before joining the Rosario Central youth system, with whom he made his professional debut in 1998.

Arias played for clubs in Argentina, Chile, Peru, Venezuela and England. He signed for English side Southampton in January 2003. but left the club in May of the same year without making a single first team appearance.

In Peru, Arias played for Sporting Cristal and Coronel Bolognesi.

In Italy, Arias played for Martina Franca.

In Chile, Arias played for Deportes Melipilla in 2008.

In Venezuela, Arias played for Yaracuyanos.

== Coaching career ==
Arias started his coaching career as the assistant coach of Pablo Marini in Montevideo City Torque.
