= Esteban Fuertes =

Argentine footballer

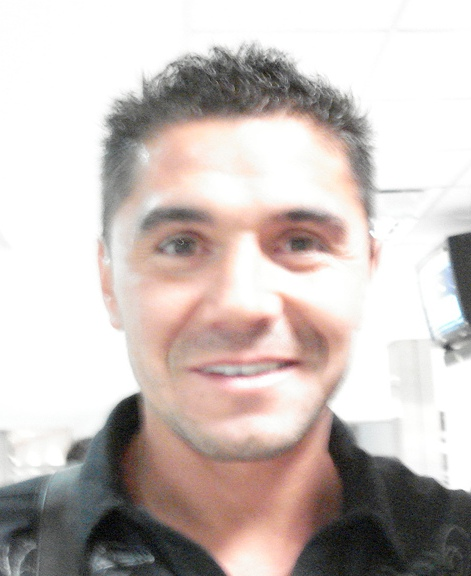
- Fuertes in 2008

Personal information
- Full name: Esteban Óscar Fuertes
- Date of birth: 26 December 1972 (age 53)
- Place of birth: Coronel Dorrego, Buenos Aires, Argentina
- Height: 1.85 m (6 ft 1 in)
- Position: Forward

Youth career
- Sarmiento CR
- Independiente CR

Senior career*
Years	Team	Apps	(Gls)
1991	Sporting Punta Alta		
1992	Independiente	1	(0)
1992–1993	El Porvenir	26	(17)
1993–1995	Los Andes	68	(31)
1995–1996	Platense	29	(9)
1996–1997	Racing Club	33	(8)
1997–1999	Colón	62	(23)
1999	Derby County	8	(1)
2000	Colón	18	(17)
2000	Lens	26	(7)
2001–2002	Tenerife	26	(5)
2002–2003	River Plate	34	(12)
2003–2006	Colón	81	(35)
2007	Universidad Católica	35	(19)
2008–2012	Colón	122	(63)
2013	Sport Boys Warnes	11	(3)
Total		577	(250)

International career
2009	Argentina	1	(0)

Managerial career
- 2017: Huracán Las Heras
- 2018: Fernández Vial
- 2019: Colón (interim)
- * Club domestic league appearances and goals

Esteban Óscar Fuertes (born 26 December 1972) is an Argentine former professional footballer who played as a forward.

== Club career ==
In July 1999, Fuertes was purchased for £2.3 million by Jim Smith, manager of Derby County in England. He scored two early goals, including the winner against Everton in the league. and another against Swansea City in the League Cup. However, weeks later, he was refused entry back into Britain when immigration officials discovered that his Italian passport was forged. Derby were able to sell him on to Lens in France for £2.8 million.

Fuertes retired from professional football on 25 June 2012 in a match against Banfield, scoring two goals. A year following his retirement, Fuertes signed a six-month contract for Bolivian side Sport Boys which had been recently promoted to the Liga de Fútbol Profesional Boliviano. He officially retired on 6 December 2013 after eleven appearances and three goals scored for the club.

== International career ==
On 20 May 2009, Fuertes made his international debut in a friendly match against Panama aged 36, making him the oldest player ever to make his debut for the Argentina national team. The Argentina team made up of players based in the Primera División Argentina won the game 3–1.

== Coaching career ==
Fuertes coached Huracán Las Heras and Colón in his homeland.

In 2018, Fuertes coached Chilean club Fernández Vial in the Segunda División Profesional.
