= Andrés Aimar =

Argentine footballer (born 1981)

Personal information
- Full name: Andrés Ricardo Aimar Giordano
- Date of birth: 18 November 1981 (age 44)
- Place of birth: Río Cuarto, Argentina
- Height: 1.74 m (5 ft 9 in)
- Position: Midfielder

Senior career*
Years	Team	Apps	(Gls)
2002–2003	River Plate	3	(1)
2003–2004	Estudiantes LP	14	(0)
2004	River Plate	0	(0)
2005	Namur	6	(0)
2005–2007	Belgrano	31	(2)
2007	Ashdod	3	(0)
2008	Aldosivi	11	(0)
2008–2009	Estoril	4	(0)
2009–2014	Estudiantes Río Cuarto		
2017–2018	Estudiantes Río Cuarto	20	(2)
- * Club domestic league appearances and goals

Andrés Ricardo Aimar Giordano (born 18 November 1981) is an Argentine former footballer who played as a midfielder.

== Club career ==
Born in Río Cuarto, Córdoba, Aimar started his professional career with Club Atlético River Plate, but could only amass three first-team appearances over two seasons. In 2003–04, he played for fellow Argentine Primera División club Estudiantes de La Plata.

After an unassuming spell in the Belgian Third Division with Union Namur Fosses-La-Ville, Aimar returned to his country, joining Club Atlético Belgrano. He moved abroad again shortly after, spending the following months with Israel's F.C. Ashdod and finishing the campaign with another team in Argentina, Primera B Nacional's Club Atlético Aldosivi.

For 2008–09, Aimar moved overseas for the third time, again having no impact whatsoever as he only appeared in four Segunda Liga matches (out of a possible 30) for Portuguese side G.D. Estoril Praia.

Aimar signed with hometown club Estudiantes de Río Cuarto in 2009, where he remained until his retirement nine years later. Immediately afterwards, he was appointed its general manager.

== Personal life ==
Aimar's older brother, Pablo, was also a footballer and a midfielder. Having also started professionally with River Plate he played for, amongst others, Valencia CF and S.L. Benfica, also appearing for the Argentina national team in two FIFA World Cups.
