= 2003–04 Argentine Primera División =

113th season of top-tier football league in Argentina

Primera División
- Season: 2003–04
- Dates: 3 August 2003 – 27 June 2004
- Champions: Apertura: Boca Juniors (26th title); Clausura: River Plate (34th title)
- 2005 Copa Libertadores: Boca Juniors; River Plate; Banfield; San Lorenzo; Quilmes
- 2004 Copa Sudamericana: Banfield; San Lorenzo; Quilmes; Arsenal
- Matches: 380

The 2003–04 Argentine Primera División was the 113th season of top-flight football in Argentina. The season ran from 3 August 2003 to 27 June 2004. Atlético de Rafaela (champion of 2002–03 Primera B Nacional) and Quilmes (which earned it after beating Argentinos Juniors in a two-legged series) were promoted from Primera B Nacional.

Boca Juniors won the Apertura (league title 26th.) and River Plate the Clausura (34th. title) championships, while four teams were relegated, Chacarita Juniors, Nueva Chicago (the last two teams in average table) plus Atlético de Rafaela and Talleres de Córdoba (which lost the promotion playoffs)

== Torneo Apertura ==
Apertura
- Season: 2003
- Dates: 1 August – 14 December
- Champions: Boca Juniors (26th. title)
- Promoted: Atlético de Rafaela; Quilmes
- Top goalscorer: (Argentina) Ernesto Farías (12)
- Biggest home win: Colón 5–1 Talleres (C) (17 Aug)
- Biggest away win: N. Chicago 0–4 Racing (28 Oct)

=== Final standings ===
Pos	Team	Pld	W	D	L	GF	GA	GD	Pts	Qualification
1	Boca Juniors	19	11	6	2	31	11	+20	39	2005 Copa Libertadores Second Stage
2	San Lorenzo	19	11	3	5	26	13	+13	36	
3	Banfield	19	9	5	5	27	18	+9	32	
4	Quilmes	19	8	7	4	20	13	+7	31	
5	Rosario Central	19	8	7	4	28	26	+2	31	
6	Newell's Old Boys	19	7	8	4	27	20	+7	29	
7	Arsenal	19	6	8	5	18	16	+2	26	
8	River Plate	19	7	5	7	23	24	−1	26	
9	Colón	19	5	9	5	23	24	−1	24	
10	Talleres (C)	19	6	6	7	27	30	−3	24	
11	Estudiantes (LP)	19	6	5	8	18	20	−2	23	
12	Racing	19	4	10	5	23	23	0	22	
13	Lanús	19	4	10	5	21	23	−2	22	
14	Independiente	19	5	7	7	15	19	−4	22	
15	Vélez Sarsfield	19	5	7	7	20	28	−8	22	
16	Chacarita Juniors	19	5	9	5	20	19	+1	24	
17	Gimnasia y Esgrima (LP)	19	5	6	8	14	22	−8	21	
18	Olimpo	19	5	5	9	17	23	−6	20	
19	Atlético de Rafaela	19	3	8	8	19	28	−9	17	
20	Nueva Chicago	19	2	5	12	14	31	−17	11	

Source: AFA
Rules for classification: 1st points; 2nd goal difference; 3rd goals scored; 4th head-to-head points; 5th head-to-head goal difference; 6th head-to-head goals scored. This does not apply to determining the champion. If two or more teams are tied in point at the end of the tournament, a playoff will be held at a neutral venue within 72 hours for the championship

=== Top scorers ===
Rank.	Player	Team	Goals
1	(Argentina) Ernesto Farías	Estudiantes (LP)	12
2	(Argentina) Alberto Acosta	San Lorenzo	10
3	(Argentina) Julián Vásquez	Newell's Old Boys	9

== Torneo Clausura ==
Clausura
- Season: 2004
- Dates: 13 February – 27 June
- Champions: River Plate (34th. title)
- Relegated: Chacarita Juniors; Nueva Chicago; Atl. Rafaela; Talleres (C)
- Top goalscorer: (Argentina) Rolando Zárate (13)
- Biggest home win: GELP 6–1 Chacarita (21 Feb)
- Biggest away win: S. Lorenzo 0–4 Racing (20 Feb); Lanús 0–4 S. Lorenzo (28 Feb)

=== Final standings ===
Pos	Team	Pld	W	D	L	GF	GA	GD	Pts	Qualification
1	River Plate	19	12	4	3	41	21	+20	40	2005 Copa Libertadores Second Stage
2	Boca Juniors	19	10	6	3	34	17	+17	36	
3	Talleres (C)	19	10	5	4	30	19	+11	35	
4	Banfield	19	9	5	5	27	17	+10	32	
5	Vélez Sarsfield	19	9	4	6	31	21	+10	31	
6	Quilmes	19	7	8	4	21	16	+5	29	
7	Arsenal	19	7	8	4	21	22	−1	29	
8	Lanús	19	5	5	9	21	27	−6	20	
9	Olimpo	19	4	7	8	18	28	−10	19	
10	Racing	19	8	4	7	29	29	0	28	
11	San Lorenzo	19	6	8	5	18	16	+2	26	
12	Atlético de Rafaela	19	7	5	7	25	24	+1	26	
13	Colón	19	7	4	8	20	26	−6	25	
14	Newell's Old Boys	19	4	10	5	28	25	+3	22	
15	Independiente	19	5	7	7	21	27	−6	22	
16	Estudiantes (LP)	19	5	6	8	19	29	−10	21	
17	Gimnasia y Esgrima (LP)	19	3	8	8	21	26	−5	17	
18	Nueva Chicago	19	2	11	6	18	27	−9	17	
19	Chacarita Juniors	19	3	8	8	21	34	−13	17	
20	Rosario Central	19	2	7	10	16	29	−13	13	

Source: AFA
Rules for classification: 1st points; 2nd goal difference; 3rd goals scored; 4th head-to-head points; 5th head-to-head goal difference; 6th head-to-head goals scored. This does not apply to determining the champion. If two or more teams are tied in point at the end of the tournament, a playoff will be held at a neutral venue within 72 hours for the championship

=== Top scorers ===
Rank.	Player	Team	Goals
1	(Argentina) Rolando Zárate	Vélez Sársfield	13
2	(Argentina) Aldo Osorio	Talleres (C)	11
3	(Argentina) Fernando Cavenaghi	River Plate	9
4	(Argentina) José Luis Calderón	Arsenal	8

== Relegation ==
=== Relegation table ===
Pos	Team	2001–02 Pts	2002–03 Pts	2003–04 Pts	Total Pts	Total Pld	Avg	Relegation
1	River Plate	84	79	66	229	114	2.009	
2	Boca Juniors	68	79	75	222	114	1.947	
3	Quilmes	—	—	60	60	38	1.579	
4	San Lorenzo	57	56	62	175	114	1.535	
5	Racing	68	53	50	171	114	1.5	
6	Vélez Sarsfield	48	66	53	167	114	1.465	
7	Colón	56	57	49	162	114	1.421	
8	Banfield	48	48	64	160	114	1.404	
9	Arsenal	—	49	55	104	76	1.368	
10	Newell's Old Boys	51	49	51	151	114	1.325	
11	Gimnasia y Esgrima (LP)	64	46	38	148	114	1.298	
12	Independiente	41	61	44	146	114	1.281	
13	Rosario Central	40	62	44	146	114	1.281	
14	Lanús	51	51	42	144	114	1.263	
15	Estudiantes (LP)	51	43	44	138	114	1.211	
16	Olimpo	—	51	39	90	76	1.184	
17	Talleres (C)	30	44	59	133	114	1.167	Relegation Playoff Matches
18	Atlético de Rafaela	—	—	43	43	38	1.132	Relegation Playoff Matches
19	Chacarita Juniors	47	41	38	126	114	1.105	Relegated to the Primera B Nacional
20	Nueva Chicago	48	41	28	117	114	1.026	Relegated to the Primera B Nacional

=== Promotion playoff ===
* Winner of the series; teams currently playing in Primera División are listed first

Series	Team 1 (1st div)	Team 2 (2nd div)	1st. leg	Venue 1	City 1	2nd. leg	Venue 2	City 2	Agg.
1	Atlético de Rafaela	Huracán (TA)	1–2	José María Minella	Mar del Plata	2–3	Nuevo Monumental	Rafaela	3–5
2	Talleres (C)	Argentinos Juniors	1–2	Malvinas Argentinas	Mendoza	1–2	Chateau Carreras	Córdoba	2–4

Atlético de Rafaela and Talleres de Córdoba were relegated to Primera B Nacional.

== See also ==
- 2003–04 in Argentine football
