= Matías Lequi =

Argentine footballer

Personal information
- Full name: Matías Emanuel Lequi
- Date of birth: 13 May 1981 (age 45)
- Place of birth: Rosario, Argentina
- Height: 1.91 m (6 ft 3 in)
- Position: Centre back

Youth career
- Rosario Central

Senior career*
Years	Team	Apps	(Gls)
1999–2001	Rosario Central	21	(1)
2001–2003	River Plate	40	(1)
2003–2004	Atlético Madrid	34	(2)
2004–2005	Lazio	6	(0)
2005–2008	Celta	81	(5)
2009–2010	Iraklis	14	(0)
2011	Las Palmas	17	(0)
2011–2012	Rosario Central	35	(2)
2012–2013	All Boys	14	(0)
2014	Sportivo Luqueño	21	(8)
2014–2015	Aldosivi	46	(3)
2016	Sarmiento	9	(0)
Total		338	(22)

Managerial career
- 2023: Rosario Central (youth)
- 2024: Rosario Central (reserves)
- 2024: Rosario Central (interim)
- 2024: Rosario Central
- * Club domestic league appearances and goals

Matías Emanuel Lequi (born 13 May 1981) is an Argentine professional football coach and former player who played as a central defender.

== Club career ==
Born in Rosario, Santa Fe, Lequi started his career with hometown side Rosario Central, then signed for Club Atlético River Plate where he won two consecutive Clausura titles. In 2003 he moved abroad, joining Atlético Madrid, making his La Liga debut on 31 August in a 0–1 away loss against Sevilla FC and only missing four matches during the season as the Colchoneros eventually finished seventh and qualified for the UEFA Intertoto Cup.

Subsequently, Lequi signed with Italy's S.S. Lazio, going pretty much unnoticed during his one season-spell. For 2005–06 he returned to Spain, being loaned to RC Celta de Vigo; as the Galicians finished in sixth position and reached the UEFA Cup straight from Segunda División, he was heavily featured, scoring against Real Madrid (2–1 home defeat) and former team Atlético (opening a 3–0 away win).

After extensive negotiations, the deal with Celta was made permanent in late May 2006, for four years. Lequi suffered relegation in the first season after his purchase and, with the club already in the second level, was sent off a total of four times in the league as they languished in 16th position; he was released in August 2008.

Lequi spent the following months training on his own. In the 2009 summer transfer window, he moved to Greek side Iraklis. On 19 January 2011, the free agent returned to Spain and signed a five-month with UD Las Palmas of the second tier.

== Honours ==
River Plate

- Argentine Primera División: Clausura 2002, 2003
