= Darío Husaín =

Argentine footballer (born 1976)

Personal information
- Full name: Darío Fernando Husaín
- Date of birth: 2 May 1976 (age 50)
- Place of birth: Haedo, Argentina
- Height: 1.76 m (5 ft 9 in)
- Position: Forward

Youth career
- Vélez Sársfield

Senior career*
Years	Team	Apps	(Gls)
1995–2002	Vélez Sársfield	211	(45)
2003	River Plate	27	(4)
2004	Universidad Católica	10	(4)
2004–2005	Racing Club	5	(0)
2006	Puerto Rico Islanders	11	(1)
2007	VB Sports Club	0	(0)
2007	Deportivo Pereira	9	(0)
2008–2009	San Martín SJ	24	(3)
2010	Itumbiara	0	(0)
2010	Juventud Unida Universitario	13	(1)
Total		310	(58)

International career
1999	Argentina	0	(0)

Managerial career
- 2013–2015: Miami Strike Force (youth)
- 2018–: Miami Strike Force (youth)
- * Club domestic league appearances and goals

Darío Fernando Husaín (born 2 May 1976) is an Argentine former footballer, from Haedo, Buenos Aires Province, who played as a forward.

== Teams ==
- (Argentina) Vélez Sársfield 1995–2002
- (Argentina) River Plate 2003
- (Chile) Universidad Católica 2004
- (Argentina) Racing Club 2004–2005
- Puerto Rico Islanders 2006
- (Maldives) VB Sports Club 2007
- (Colombia) Deportivo Pereira 2007
- (Argentina) San Martín de San Juan 2008–2009
- (Brazil) Itumbiara 2010
- (Argentina) Juventud Unida Universitario 2010

== Personal life ==
His older brother, Claudio, is also a former professional football player.

== Titles ==
- Vélez Sarsfield 1996 (Torneo Clausura), 1998 (Torneo Clausura)
- River Plate 2003 (Torneo Clausura)
- Universidad Católica 2004 (Torneo Amistoso)
