= 1999–2000 Argentine Primera División =

109th season of top-tier football league in Argentina

Primera División
- Season: 1999–2000
- Dates: August 7, 1999 – July 17, 2000
- Champions: Apertura: River Plate (30th. title); Clausura: River Plate (31st. title)
- Promoted: Instituto (C); Chacarita Juniors
- 2000 Copa Libertadores: Rosario Central; San Lorenzo
- 1999 Copa Conmebol: Talleres (C) (Note: Replaced Gimnasia y Esgrima LP after it declined to participate.)
- 2000 Copa Mercosur: Boca Juniors (Note: Guest team.); River Plate; Independiente; San Lorenzo; Rosario Central; Vélez Sársfield
- 2001 Copa Libertadores: River Plate; San Lorenzo; Rosario Central; Vélez Sársfield
- Matches: 380

The 1999–2000 Argentine Primera División was the 109th season of top-flight football in Argentina. The season ran from August 7, 1999 to July 17, 2000. Instituto de Córdoba (champion of 1998–99 Primera B Nacional) and Chacarita Juniors (winner of "Torneo Reducido" after beating Juventud Antoniana in a two-legged series) were promoted from Primera B Nacional.

As Conmebol extended the number of 2000 Copa Libertadores clubs from 23 to 34, four Argentine clubs were eligible to play the tournament. As Boca Juniors and River Plate had already qualified, Rosario Central and San Lorenzo (2nd and 4th respectively) earned their right to play the Copa Libertadores. On the other hand, Talleres de Córdoba replaced Gimnasia y Esgrima to play the 1999 Copa Conmebol after the club from La Plata declined to participate.

At the end of Torneo Clausura, the best five placed teams earned right to play the 2001 Copa Libertadores while six participants of 2000 Copa Mercosur were eligible by similar system.

River Plate won both, Apertura and Clausura championships (totalising 31 league titles to date). For the first time in Primera División, a promotion and relegation system was introduced. The two teams with the worst average were directly relegated to the second division while teams placed 17th and 18th in average played two leg series each with two teams from Primera B Nacional.

As a result, three teams were relegated, Ferro Carril Oeste, Gimnasia y Esgrima (J) (worst averages) and Instituto (C) (lost promotion to Almagro). Belgrano remained in Primera after the series vs Quilmes ended 4–4 on aggregate.

== Torneo Apertura ==
Apertura
- Season: 1999
- Dates: 6 August – 20 December
- Champions: River Plate (30th. title)
- Promoted: Instituto (C); Chacarita Juniors
- Top goalscorer: (Argentina) Javier Saviola (15)
- Biggest home win: Chacarita 6–1 Belgrano (17 Oct)
- Biggest away win: Belgrano 1–5 Boca Jrs. (12 Dec)
- Highest scoring: Gimnasia LP 4–5 Talleres (12 Dec)

=== League standings ===
Pos	Team	Pld	W	D	L	GF	GA	GD	Pts
1	River Plate	19	13	5	1	42	21	+21	44
2	Rosario Central	19	14	1	4	34	18	+16	43
3	Boca Juniors	19	12	5	2	36	15	+21	41
4	San Lorenzo	19	10	6	3	30	15	+15	33 (Note: 3 points deducted)
5	Talleres (C)	19	9	4	6	38	31	+7	31
6	Racing	19	7	9	3	27	22	+5	30
7	Vélez Sársfield	19	8	6	5	28	17	+11	27
8	Chacarita Juniors	19	6	7	6	38	33	+5	25
9	Independiente	19	6	7	6	19	21	−2	25
10	Estudiantes (LP)	19	6	5	8	29	33	−4	23
11	Lanús	19	7	2	10	23	30	−7	23
12	Gimnasia y Esgrima (LP)	19	4	9	6	28	28	0	21
13	Newell's Old Boys	19	5	6	8	27	27	0	21
14	Argentinos Juniors	19	4	9	6	20	22	−2	21
15	Unión	19	5	6	8	24	30	−6	21
16	Instituto	19	5	7	7	23	30	−7	19
17	Colón	19	5	4	10	20	28	−8	19
18	Belgrano	19	5	5	9	25	37	−12	17
19	Gimnasia y Esgrima (J)	19	2	3	14	17	43	−26	9
20	Ferro Carril Oeste	19	1	6	12	14	44	−30	9

=== Top scorers ===
Rank.	Player	Team	Goals
1	(Argentina) Javier Saviola	River Plate	15
2	(Argentina) Martín Palermo	Boca Juniors	14
3	(Argentina) Juan Antonio Pizzi	Rosario Central	12

== Torneo Clausura ==
Clausura
- Season: 2000
- Dates: 11 February – 17 July
- Champions: River Plate (31st. title)
- Relegated: Ferro Carril Oeste; Gimnasia y Esg. (J); Instituto (C) (Note: Via promotion playoff.)
- Top goalscorer: (Argentina) Esteban Fuertes (17)
- Biggest home win: Racing 6–0 Unión 8 Jul)
- Biggest away win: Ferro 1–5 Belgrano (22 May)
- Highest scoring: Gimnasia LP 6–6 Colón (19 Mar)

=== League standings ===
Pos	Team	Pld	W	D	L	GF	GA	GD	Pts
1	River Plate	19	12	6	1	44	17	+27	42
2	Independiente	19	11	3	5	42	25	+17	36
3	Colón	19	11	3	5	27	15	+12	36
4	San Lorenzo	19	11	3	5	27	15	+12	36
5	Newell's Old Boys	19	10	4	5	32	21	+11	34
6	Vélez Sársfield	19	9	7	3	28	18	+10	34
7	Boca Juniors	19	10	6	3	38	17	+21	33
8	Unión	19	9	2	8	28	40	−12	29
9	Gimnasia y Esgrima (LP)	19	8	4	7	28	33	−5	28
10	Talleres (C)	19	7	6	6	21	22	−1	27
11	Lanús	19	8	4	7	32	22	+10	25 (Note: 3 points deducted)
12	Instituto	19	6	7	6	28	29	−1	25
13	Rosario Central	19	6	5	8	25	26	−1	23
14	Belgrano	19	6	4	9	28	31	−3	22
15	Chacarita Juniors	19	5	5	9	20	30	−10	20
16	Argentinos Juniors	19	4	6	9	21	36	−15	18
17	Estudiantes (LP)	19	3	7	9	21	30	−9	16
18	Racing	19	3	6	10	22	29	−7	15
19	Gimnasia y Esgrima (J)	19	2	4	13	15	34	−19	10
20	Ferro Carril Oeste	19	2	2	15	9	46	−37	8

=== Top scorers ===
Rank.	Player	Team	Goals
1	(Argentina) Esteban Fuertes	Colón	17
2	(Argentina) Bruno Marioni	Independiente	13
3	(Argentina) Daniel Jiménez	Instituto (C)	12

== Relegation ==
=== Relegation table ===
Team	Average	Points	Played	1997–98	1998–99	1999–2000
Boca Juniors	2.070	236	114	73	89	74
River Plate	1.921	219	114	74	58	86
San Lorenzo	1.684	192	114	62	61	69
Vélez Sársfield	1.623	185	114	78	46	61
Rosario Central	1.593	180	114	57	47	66
Gimnasia y Esgrima (LP)	1.593	180	114	69	62	49
Independiente	1.474	168	114	56	51	61
Lanús	1.430	163	114	65	50	48
Talleres (C)	1.342	102	76	N/A	44	58
Newell's Old Boys	1.307	149	114	42	52	55
Argentinos Juniors	1.272	145	114	57	49	39
Colón	1.246	142	114	38	49	55
Racing	1.237	141	114	41	55	45
Unión	1.202	137	114	33	54	50
Chacarita Juniors	1.184	45	38	N/A	N/A	45
Estudiantes (LP)	1.167	133	114	49	45	39
Instituto	1.158	44	38	N/A	N/A	44
Belgrano	1.092	83	76	N/A	44	39
Gimnasia y Esgrima (J)	1.035	118	114	52	47	19
Ferro Carril Oeste	0.886	101	114	49	35	17

- Played the relegation playoff
- Relegated to Primera B Nacional

=== Promotion Playoffs ===
For the first time in Primera División, a promotion playoff system was implemented in order to decide which teams would be promoted from the second division (or relegated from Primera División), apart from the two worst averages that were directly relegated. The system ruled that clubs with the third and four worst averages played a two-legged series versus two teams qualified from Primera B Nacional. In case of being tied on points, teams in Primera División would win the series.

Instituto and Belgrano (both from Córdoba) played the promotion playoff v Almagro and Quilmes (qualified from 1999–2000 Primera B Nacional) respectively. Belgrano remained in Primera División after a 4–4 tie because of the sporting advantage rule, while Almagro relegated Instituto after winning 3–1 on points, promoting to Primera División for the first time in its history.

* Winner of the series; teams currently playing in Primera División are listed first

Series	Team 1 (1st div)	Team 2 (2nd div)	1st. leg	Venue 1	City 1	2nd. leg	Venue 2	City 2	Agg.
1	Quilmes	Belgrano (C)	3–1	Estadio Centenario	Quilmes	3–1	Chateau Carreras Stadium	Córdoba	4–4 (Note: Belgrano remained in Primera División because of a sporting advantage rule.)
2	Almagro	Instituto (C)	1–0	Estadio Tres de Febrero	José Ingenieros	1–1	Estadio Presidente Perón	Córdoba	2–1

== See also ==
- 1999–2000 in Argentine football
