= Martín Cardetti =

Argentine footballer and manager (born 1975)

Personal information
- Full name: Martín Alejandro Cardetti
- Date of birth: 22 October 1975 (age 51)
- Place of birth: Río Cuarto, Argentina
- Height: 1.70 m (5 ft 7 in)
- Position: Forward

Senior career*
Years	Team	Apps	(Gls)
1995–1997	Rosario Central	52	(18)
1997–1998	River Plate	23	(10)
1998–1999	Salamanca	24	(5)
1999–2002	River Plate	74	(39)
2002–2003	Paris Saint-Germain	21	(7)
2003–2004	Valladolid	12	(0)
2005	Racing Club	14	(2)
2006	Pumas UNAM	16	(4)
2006	Gimnasia de La Plata	8	(2)
2007	Deportivo Cali	19	(9)
2007–2008	Colón	28	(4)
2010	Boston River	10	(1)

Managerial career
- 2010–2014: Boston River (assistant)
- 2015–2016: Uruguay de Coronado
- 2018–2019: San Carlos
- 2019: Mushuc Runa
- 2021: Bogotá
- 2022: Santa Fe
- 2022–2023: Real Cartagena
- 2024: Llaneros
- 2025: Comerciantes Unidos
- 2025: Real Cartagena
- * Club domestic league appearances and goals

Martín Cardetti (born 22 October 1975) is an Argentine football manager and former player who played as a forward. He played professional club football in Argentina, Spain, France, Mexico, Uruguay and Colombia.

== Club career ==
Cardetti was born in Río Cuarto, Argentina on 22 October 1975. He started his career in 1995 at Rosario Central, he helped the club claim the 1995 Copa CONMEBOL.

In 1997, he joined River Plate where he played a part in the team that won the Apertura title and the Supercopa Sudamericana in 1997.

In 1998 Cardetti moved to Spain to play for Salamanca but it did not work out for him and he returned to River Plate in 1999. He won a further three titles with River Plate before trying his luck in European football for a second time.

Paris Saint-Germain signed Cardetti in 2002, but his spell in France only lasted one season. He moved to Real Valladolid in 2003 and back to Argentina to join Racing Club in 2005. Later in 2005 Cardetti played for Mexican UNAM Pumas but he returned to Argentina once again to play for Gimnasia de La Plata.

During the 2007 January transfer window Cardetti joined Deportivo Cali. After a slow season start, Martin has shown all his potential as key player, becoming MVP during last semifinal game, in which Deportivo Cali beat Boyacá Chicó.

After only a few months with Deportivo Cali Cardetti returned to Argentina to play for Colón de Santa Fe.

== Managerial career ==
Cardetti was named manager of Costa Rican side Uruguay de Coronado in December 2014.

== Titles and awards ==
Season	Club	Title
1995	Rosario Central	Copa Conmebol
Apertura 1997	River Plate	Primera Division Argentina
1997	River Plate	Supercopa Sudamericana
Apertura 1999	River Plate	Primera Division Argentina
Clausura 2000	River Plate	Primera Division Argentina
Apertura 2001	River Plate	Primera División Argentina top scorer: 16 goals
Clausura 2002	River Plate	Primera Division Argentina
