= 2002–03 Argentine Primera División =

Primera División
- Season: 2002–03
- Dates: 26 July 2002 – 6 July 2003
- Champions: Apertura: Independiente (16th title); Clausura: River Plate (33rd title)
- 2004 Copa Libertadores: Boca Juniors; Independiente; River Plate; Rosario Central; Vélez Sarsfield
- 2003 Copa Sudamericana: Boca Juniors; Colón; Independiente; River Plate; Rosario Central; San Lorenzo; Vélez Sarsfield
- Matches: 380

The 2002–03 Argentine Primera División was the 112th season of top-flight football in Argentina. The season ran from 26 July 2002 to 6 July 2003. Olimpo (Bahía Blanca) (champion of 2001–02 Primera B Nacional, making its debut in Primera) and Arsenal (winner of "Torneo Reducido" after beating Gimnasia y Esgrima de Concepción del Uruguay in a two-legged series) were promoted from Primera B Nacional.

Independiente won the Apertura (16th. title) while River Plate won the Clausura (33rd. title). On the other hand, Talleres de Córdoba and Nueva Chicago played the promotion playoff v San Martín de Mendoza and Argentinos Juniors respectively, in order to define which team would remain in (or promote to) Primera División. As teams in Primea División beat their rivals, teams relegated were Unión de Santa Fe and Huracán).

== Torneo Apertura ==
=== Final standings ===
Apertura
- Season: 2002
- Dates: 26 July – 1 December
- Champions: Independiente (16th. title)
- Promoted: Olimpo; Arsenal
- Top goalscorer: (Argentina) Andrés Silvera (16)
- Biggest home win: Independiente 7–1 Colón (6 Sep); Estudiantes (LP) 6–0 Olimpo (13 Oct)
- Biggest away win: Estudiantes (LP) 0–6 River Plate (24 Aug)
- Highest scoring: Chacarita 2–6 Independiente (13 Sep)

Pos	Team	Pld	W	D	L	GF	GA	GD	Pts
1	Independiente	19	13	4	2	48	19	+29	43
2	Boca Juniors	19	12	4	3	32	15	+17	40
3	River Plate	19	11	3	5	35	23	+12	36
4	Chacarita Juniors	19	9	3	7	19	21	−2	30
5	Vélez Sársfield	19	8	4	7	23	19	+4	28
6	Racing	19	8	4	7	28	28	0	28
7	Colón	19	7	7	5	26	26	0	28
8	Arsenal	19	7	6	6	29	25	+4	27
9	San Lorenzo	19	7	6	6	28	25	+3	27
10	Newell's Old Boys	19	7	6	6	23	22	+1	27
11	Lanús	19	6	8	5	21	24	−3	26
12	Banfield	19	6	7	6	21	17	+4	25
13	Rosario Central	19	7	4	8	36	34	+2	25
14	Unión	19	6	5	8	26	28	−2	23
15	Talleres (C)	19	5	8	6	23	27	−4	23
16	Gimnasia y Esgrima (LP)	19	4	8	7	18	24	−6	20
17	Olimpo	19	5	5	9	20	30	−10	20
18	Nueva Chicago	19	3	6	10	20	29	−9	15
19	Estudiantes (LP)	19	4	3	12	21	36	−15	15
20	Huracán	19	2	5	12	17	42	−25	11

=== Top scorers ===
Rank.	Player	Team	Goals
1	(Argentina) Andrés Silvera	Independiente	16
2	(Argentina) César Carignano	Colón	11
3	(Argentina) Luciano Figueroa	Rosario Central	10

== Torneo Clausura ==
Clausura
- Season: 2003
- Dates: 14 February – 6 July
- Champions: River Plate (33rd. title)
- Relegated: Unión (SF); Huracán
- Top goalscorer: (Argentina) Luciano Figueroa (17)
- Biggest home win: R. Central 7–2 Boca Jrs. (6 July)
- Biggest away win: Huracán 0–6 River Plate (23 Mar)

=== Final standings ===
Pos	Team	Pld	W	D	L	GF	GA	GD	Pts
1	River Plate	19	13	4	2	43	18	+25	43
2	Boca Juniors	19	12	3	4	36	23	+13	39
3	Vélez Sársfield	19	12	2	5	27	12	+15	38
4	Rosario Central	19	10	7	2	40	18	+22	37
5	Olimpo	19	9	4	6	22	17	+5	31
6	Colón	19	7	8	4	19	14	+5	29
7	San Lorenzo	19	8	5	6	27	28	−1	29
8	Estudiantes (LP)	19	7	7	5	24	18	+6	28
9	Nueva Chicago	19	7	5	7	29	33	−4	26
10	Gimnasia y Esgrima (LP)	19	7	5	7	21	26	−5	26
11	Racing	19	6	7	6	26	24	+2	25
12	Lanús	19	7	4	8	27	29	−2	25
13	Banfield	19	6	5	8	18	20	−2	23
14	Arsenal	19	4	10	5	12	13	−1	22
15	Newell's Old Boys	19	5	7	7	21	26	−5	22
16	Talleres (C)	19	5	6	8	23	26	−3	21
17	Independiente	19	4	6	9	13	25	−12	18
18	Unión	19	4	5	10	18	29	−11	17
19	Chacarita Juniors	19	2	5	12	11	24	−13	11
20	Huracán	19	1	3	15	12	46	−34	6

=== Top scorers ===
Rank	Player	Team	Goals
1	(Argentina) Luciano Figueroa	Rosario Central	17
2	(Argentina) Roberto Nanni	Vélez Sársfield	15
3	(Argentina) Fernando Cavenaghi	River Plate	12

==== Tournament review ====
River Plate, Boca Juniors and Velez Sarsfield were the teams who kept the league's lead for most of the tournament (except for Round 4, when the temporary leader was Rosario Central, who finished fourth), and those three teams were the ones who arrived at the last rounds with possibilities of winning the tournament.

Velez Sarsfield started the tournament with three consecutive wins, obtaining the lead at the end of Round 3. Boca Juniors went on a winning streak from rounds 3 to 7, winning five consecutive games, taking the lead at the end of Round 5.

On May 4, 2003, during Round 11, Velez Sarsfield got a home win against leaders Boca Juniors and after three more consecutive wins, regained the top position in the league.

On June 1, during Round 14, Boca Juniors and River Plate confronted each other in the Superclásico at Boca Juniors stadium. The game ended 2-2 and allowed Velez, who won their match, to be the sole leaders of the league.

However, an unexpected home loss to Olimpo on Round 15, made Velez lose the first position as Boca and River won their matches against Huracán and San Lorenzo respectively. At the end of the matchday, Boca Juniors were the new leaders.

On June 15, during Round 16, River Plate defeated Lanús and because Velez and Boca tied their games, finished the match day as sole leaders.

On June 29, during Round 18, River defeated Olimpo in Bahía Blanca and won the championship, by getting a difference of 4 points to rivals Boca Juniors, with only 1 round to go.

This table shows the evolution of the league table, showing team result, overall points and position on the table at the end of each round for the three teams that fought for the championship until the last rounds.

Position by round
Team ╲ Round	1	2	3	4	5	6	7	8	9	10	11	12	13	14	15	16	17	18	19
River Plate	6	13	9	8	5	4	2	1	1	1	1	2	2	3	2	1	1	1	1
Boca Juniors	1	8	6	3	1	1	1	1	1	1	2	1	1	2	1	2	3	2	2
Vélez Sarsfield	1	1	1	3	6	5	3	3	3	3	3	2	2	1	3	3	2	3	3

Source: www.rsssf.com

Points by round
Team ╲ Round	1	2	3	4	5	6	7	8	9	10	11	12	13	14	15	16	17	18	19
River Plate	1	1	4	7	10	13	16	19	22	25	26	27	30	31	34	37	40	43	43
Boca Juniors	3	3	6	9	12	15	18	19	22	25	25	28	31	32	35	36	36	39	39
Vélez Sarsfield	3	6	9	9	10	13	16	19	22	22	25	28	31	34	34	35	38	38	38

Source: www.rsssf.com

Result by round
Team ╲ Round	1	2	3	4	5	6	7	8	9	10	11	12	13	14	15	16	17	18	19
River Plate	D	L	W	W	W	W	W	W	W	W	D	D	W	D	W	W	W	W	L
Boca Juniors	W	L	W	W	W	W	W	D	W	W	L	W	W	D	W	D	L	W	L
Vélez Sarsfield	W	W	W	L	D	W	W	W	W	L	W	W	W	W	L	D	W	L	L

Source: www.rsssf.com

== Relegation ==
=== Relegation table ===
Team	Average	Points	Played	2000–01	2001–02	2002–03
River Plate	2.114	241	114	78	84	79
Boca Juniors	1.912	218	114	71	68	79
San Lorenzo	1.702	194	114	81	57	56
Vélez Sársfield	1.491	170	114	56	48	66
Gimnasia y Esgrima (LP)	1.447	165	114	55	64	46
Racing	1.439	164	114	40	71	53
Colón	1.421	162	114	49	56	57
Estudiantes (LP)	1.342	153	114	56	54	43
Newell's Old Boys	1.298	148	114	48	51	49
Olimpo	1.289	49	38	N/A	N/A	49
Arsenal	1.289	49	38	N/A	N/A	49
Lanús	1.272	145	114	43	51	51
Independiente	1.263	144	114	42	41	61
Banfield	1.263	96	76	N/A	48	48
Chacarita Juniors	1.263	144	114	56	47	41
Rosario Central	1.254	143	114	41	40	62
Talleres (C)	1.184	135	114	61	30	44
Nueva Chicago	1.171	89	76	N/A	48	41
Unión	1.096	125	114	46	39	40
Huracán	1.026	117	114	55	44	18

- Played the relegation playoff
- Relegated to Primera B Nacional

=== Promotion Playoffs ===
* Winner of the series; teams currently playing in Primera División are listed first

Series	Team 1 (1st div)	Team 2 (2nd div)	1st. leg	Venue 1	City 1	2nd. leg	Venue 2	City 2	Agg.
1	Nueva Chicago	Argentinos Juniors	1–0	Pedro Bidegain	Buenos Aires	2–0	Pedro Bidegain	Buenos Aires	3–0
2	Talleres (C)	San Martín (M)	1–0	Malvinas Argentinas	Mendoza	1–0	Chateau Carreras	Córdoba	2–0

Nueva Chicago and Talleres (C) remained in Primera División.

== See also ==
- 2002-03 in Argentine football
