= 2001–02 Argentine Primera División =

111th season of top-tier football league in Argentina

Primera División
- Season: 2001–02
- Dates: August 17, 2001 – May 19, 2002
- Champions: Apertura: Racing Club (16th title); Clausura: River Plate (32nd. title)
- 2003 Copa Libertadores: Racing Club; River Plate; Boca Juniors; Gimnasia y Esgrima LP
- 2002 Copa Sudamericana: Boca Juniors (Note: Guest team.); River Plate; Racing Club; Gimnasia y Esgrima LP
- Matches played: 380

The 2001–02 Argentine Primera División was the 111th season of top-flight football in Argentina. The season ran from August 17, 2001 to May 19, 2002.

Racing Club de Avellaneda won the Apertura (its 16th league title, after 35 years with no domestic championships) and River Plate the Clausura (32nd title) championships, while Belgrano (C) and Argentinos Juniors were relegated to the second division.

In continental cups, Copa Sudamericana replaced Copa Mercosur, last held in 2001.

== Torneo Apertura ==
Apertura
- Season: 2001
- Dates: 17 August 2001 – 5 February 2002
- Champions: Racing (16th. title)
- Promoted: Banfield; Nueva Chicago
- Top goalscorer: (Argentina) Martín Cardetti (17)
- Biggest home win: Boca Juniors 6–1 Lanús (23 Sep)
- Biggest away win: Banfield 0–5 Newell's (19 Aug); Independiente 0–5 River Plate (3 Oct)
- Highest scoring: Boca Juniors 5–3 Independiente (16 Dec)

Pos	Team	Pld	W	D	L	GF	GA	GD	Pts
1	Racing	19	12	6	1	34	17	+17	42
2	River Plate	19	12	5	2	51	16	+35	41
3	Boca Juniors	19	9	6	4	41	27	+14	33
4	Colón	19	8	8	3	24	16	+8	32
5	San Lorenzo	19	8	7	4	28	22	+6	31
6	Estudiantes (LP)	19	7	6	6	27	28	−1	27
7	Gimnasia y Esgrima (LP)	19	7	6	6	30	35	−5	27
8	Chacarita Juniors	19	6	8	5	28	24	+4	26
9	Belgrano	19	6	8	5	17	18	−1	26
10	Independiente	19	7	5	7	26	28	−2	26
11	Argentinos Juniors	19	7	4	8	22	27	−5	25
12	Lanús	19	7	4	8	21	28	−7	25
13	Nueva Chicago	19	7	3	9	26	33	−7	24
14	Newell's Old Boys	19	6	5	8	29	28	+1	23
15	Vélez Sársfield	19	5	7	7	27	30	−3	22
16	Rosario Central	19	5	5	9	18	26	−8	20
17	Unión	19	3	9	7	23	25	−2	18
18	Banfield	19	4	6	9	16	24	−8	18
19	Huracán	19	3	5	11	22	39	−17	14
20	Talleres (C)	19	4	1	14	18	37	−19	13

=== Top scorers ===
Rank.	Player	Team	Goals
1	(Argentina) Martín Cardetti	River Plate	17
2	(Uruguay) Diego Forlán	Independiente	12
3	(Argentina) Facundo Sava	Gimnasia y Esgrima (LP)	11

== Torneo Clausura ==
Clausura
- Season: 2002
- Dates: 8 February – 19 May
- Champions: River Plate (32nd. title)
- Relegated: Argentinos Juniors; Belgrano (C)
- Top goalscorer: (Argentina) Fernando Cavenaghi (15)
- Biggest home win: River Plate 6–0 Unión (19 Feb)
- Biggest away win: Huracán 1–6 Estudiantes (LP) (28 Mar)

Pos	Team	Pld	W	D	L	GF	GA	GD	Pts
1	River Plate	19	13	4	2	39	13	+26	43
2	Gimnasia y Esgrima (LP)	19	11	4	4	33	23	+10	37
3	Boca Juniors	19	10	5	4	25	17	+8	35
4	Huracán	19	9	3	7	27	14	+13	30
5	Banfield	19	8	6	5	21	19	+2	30
6	Racing	19	8	5	6	19	17	+2	29
7	Newell's Old Boys	19	8	4	7	26	25	+1	28
8	Estudiantes (LP)	19	7	6	6	34	27	+7	27
9	Vélez Sársfield	19	7	5	7	27	20	+7	26
10	Lanús	19	6	8	5	20	18	+2	26
11	San Lorenzo	19	6	8	5	24	23	+1	26
12	Colón	19	6	6	7	24	23	+1	24
13	Nueva Chicago	19	6	6	7	16	21	−5	24
14	Chacarita Juniors	20	4	9	7	23	24	−1	21
15	Unión	19	5	6	8	20	27	−7	21
16	Rosario Central	19	5	5	9	20	26	−6	20
17	Argentinos Juniors	19	5	5	9	20	32	−12	20
18	Belgrano	19	5	3	11	16	24	−8	18
19	Talleres (C)	19	5	2	12	14	31	−17	17
20	Independiente	19	3	6	10	14	28	−14	15

=== Top scorers ===
Rank.	Player	Team	Goals
1	(Argentina) Fernando Cavenaghi	River Plate	15
2	(Argentina) Facundo Sava	Gimnasia y Esgrima (LP)	12
3	(Argentina) Ernesto Farías	Estudiantes (LP)	11

== Relegation ==
=== Relegation table ===
Team	Average	Points	Played	1999–00	2000–01	2001-02
River Plate	2.175	248	114	86	78	84
Boca Juniors	1.877	214	114	74	71	68
San Lorenzo	1.815	207	114	69	81	57
Gimnasia y Esgrima (LP)	1.473	168	114	49	55	64
Vélez Sársfield	1.447	165	114	61	56	48
Colón	1.421	162	114	55	49	56
Racing	1.368	156	114	45	40	71
Newell's Old Boys	1.350	154	114	55	48	51
Estudiantes (LP)	1.307	149	114	39	56	54
Talleres (C)	1.307	149	114	58	61	30
Huracán	1.303	99	76	N/A	55	44
Chacarita Juniors	1.298	148	114	45	56	47
Rosario Central	1.289	147	114	66	41	40
Banfield	1.263	96	76	N/A	N/A	48
Independiente	1.263	144	114	61	42	41
Nueva Chicago	1.263	48	38	N/A	N/A	48
Lanús	1.245	142	114	48	43	51
Unión (SF)	1.184	135	114	50	46	38
Argentinos Juniors	1.114	127	114	39	43	45
Belgrano	1.052	120	114	39	37	44

- Played the relegation playoff
- Relegated to Primera B Nacional

=== Promotion Playoffs ===
* Winner of the series; teams currently playing in Primera División are listed first

Series	Team 1 (1st div)	Team 2 (2nd div)	1st. leg	Venue 1	City 1	2nd. leg	Venue 2	City 2	Agg.
1	Lanús	Huracán (TA)	2–1	Ciudad de V. López	Florida	1–1	Ciudad de Lanús	Lanús	3–2
2	Unión (SF)	Gimnasia y Esgrima (CU)	1–3	Manuel y Ramón Núñez	Conc. del Uruguay	3–0	15 de Abril	Santa Fe	4–3

== Broadcasting rights ==
=== Television ===
NexTV! and RedeTV! only are broadcast live called El Partido del Viernes on free-to-air TV each Friday at 21:00 (K.O 21:10) with production from the Torneos y Competencias.

== See also ==
- 2001–02 in Argentine football
