= List of Argentine footballers in Serie A =

The list of Argentine men's footballers in Serie A records the association football players from Argentina who have appeared at least once for a team in the Italian Serie A. Entries in bold denote players still active in actual season.

== A ==
- Roberto Aballay – Genoa – 1949–50
- Pepito Agosto – Torino, Livorno – 1931–32, 1934–35
- Roberto Alarcón – Genoa – 1949–50
- Carlos Alcaraz – Juventus – 2023–24
- Roberto Allemandi – Roma – 1934–35, 1936–37
- Matías Almeyda – Lazio, Parma, Inter, Brescia – 1997–2005
- Sergio Almirón – Udinese, Empoli, Juventus, Fiorentina, Bari, Catania – 2001–03, 2005–14
- Pablo Álvarez – Catania – 2007–14
- Ricky Álvarez – Inter, Sampdoria – 2011–14, 2015–18
- Bruno Amione – Verona, Sampdoria – 2022–24
- **Mikel Amondarain** – **Bologna** – 2026–
- Mariano Andújar – Palermo, Catania, Napoli – 2005–06, 2009–15
- Cristian Ansaldi – Genoa, Inter, Torino – 2015–22
- Juan Antonio – Sampdoria – 2012–13
- Santiago Ascacíbar – Cremonese – 2022–23
- Roberto Ayala – Napoli, Milan – 1995–2000

== B ==
- Abel Balbo – Udinese, Roma, Parma, Fiorentina – 1989–90, 1992–2002
- **Leonardo Balerdi** – **Roma** – 2026–
- Éver Banega – Inter – 2016–17
- Juan Barbas – Lecce – 1985–86, 1988–90
- Enzo Barrenechea – Juventus, Frosinone – 2022–24
- Evaristo Barrera – Lazio, Napoli – 1939–42
- Pablo Barrientos – Catania – 2009–14
- Gustavo Bartelt – Roma – 1998–2000
- José María Basanta – Fiorentina – 2014–15
- Oscar Basso – Inter – 1949–50
- Gabriel Batistuta – Fiorentina, Roma, Inter – 1991–93, 1994–2003
- Carlos Bello – Sampdoria – 1947–48
- Fernando Belluschi – Genoa– 2011–12
- Lucas Beltrán – Fiorentina – 2023–25
- Gonzalo Bergessio – Catania, Sampdoria – 2010–15
- Attilio Bernasconi – Torino – 1933–34
- Sergio Berti – Parma – 1992–93
- César Bertolo – Torino, Livorno – 1931–32, 1937–38
- Nicolás Bertolo – Palermo – 2009–10, 2011–13
- Daniel Bertoni – Fiorentina, Napoli, Udinese – 1980–87
- Nicolás Bianchi Arce – Pescara – 2012–13
- Lucas Biglia – Lazio, Milan – 2013–20
- Albano Bizarri – Catania, Lazio, Genoa, Chievo, Pescara, Udinese – 2007–09, 2011–18
- Mario Bolatti – Fiorentina – 2009–11
- Silvio Bonino – Alessandria, Bari, Livorno – 1936–37, 1938–41
- Claudio Borghi – Como – 1987–88
- Mauro Boselli – Genoa, Palermo – 2010–11, 2012–13
- Rubén Botta – Inter, Chievo – 2013–15
- Jonathan Bottinelli – Sampdoria – 2008–09
- Elmo Bovio – Inter – 1946–47
- Lucas Boyé – Torino – 2016–18
- Mario Boyé – Genoa – 1949–50
- Juan Brunetta – Parma – 2020–21
- Guillermo Burdisso – Roma – 2010–11
- Nicolás Burdisso – Inter, Roma, Genoa, Torino – 2004–18
- Mauro Burruchaga – Chievo – 2018–19

== C ==
- José Luis Calderón – Napoli – 1997–98
- Adrián Calello – Siena, Chievo – 2012–14
- Juán Calichio – Sampdoria – 1947–48
- Salvador Calvanese – Genoa, Catania, Atalanta – 1959–66
- Esteban Cambiasso – Inter – 2004–14
- Hugo Campagnaro – Piacenza, Sampdoria, Napoli, Inter, Pescara – 2002–03, 2007–15, 2016–17
- Antonio Campilongo – Roma – 1939–40
- Claudio Caniggia – Verona, Atalanta, Roma – 1988–93
- Ángel Capuano – Genoa – 1935–36
- Milton Caraglio – Pescara – 2012–13
- Ezequiel Carboni – Catania – 2008–11
- **Franco Carboni** – Monza, Venezia, **Parma** – 2022–23, 2024–
- Valentín Carboni – Inter, Monza, Genoa – 2022–24, 2025–26
- Luis César Carniglia – Sampdoria – 1964–66
- Juan Pablo Carrizo – Lazio, Catania, Inter – 2008–09, 2011–17
- Taty Castellanos – Lazio – 2023–26
- Eugenio Castellucci – Juventus – 1930–31
- José Ignacio Castillo – Lecce, Fiorentina, Bari – 2008–11
- Lucas Castro – Catania, Chievo, Cagliari, SPAL – 2012–14, 2015–20
- **Santiago Castro** – Bologna, **Roma** – 2023–
- Lucas Castroman – Lazio, Udinese – 2000–04
- Sebastián Cejas – Fiorentina, Empoli – 2004–06
- Gastón Cellerino – Livorno – 2009–10
- Adrián Centurión – Genoa – 2013–14, 2017–18
- Alberto Cerioni – Inter – 1946–47
- Mauro Cetto – Palermo – 2011–13
- José Chamot – Pisa, Foggia, Lazio, Milan – 1990–91, 1993–98, 1999–2003
- Cristian Chávez – Napoli – 2011–12
- Leandro Chichizola – Parma – 2024–25
- Ezequiel Cirigliano – Verona – 2013–14
- Fabricio Coloccini – Milan – 2004–05
- José Compagnucci – Bari – 1940–41
- Raúl Conti – Juventus, Atalanta, Bari – 1956–61
- Gastón Córdoba – Sampdoria – 1998–99
- Joaquín Correa – Sampdoria, Lazio, Inter – 2014–16, 2018–23, 2024–25
- Tino Costa – Genoa, Fiorentina – 2014–16
- Hernán Crespo – Parma, Lazio, Inter, Milan, Genoa – 1996–2003, 2004–05, 2006–12
- Jonathan Cristaldo – Bologna – 2013–14
- Juan Manuel Cruz – Verona – 2023–24
- Julio Ricardo Cruz – Bologna, Inter, Lazio – 2000–10
- Ernesto Cucchiaroni – Milan, Sampdoria – 1956–63
- Leandro Cufré – Roma, Siena – 2002–06
- José Curti – Sampdoria, Padova, Triestina, Torino – 1948–56

== D ==
- Jesús Dátolo – Napoli – 2008–10
- Atilio Demaría – Inter – 1931–36, 1938–43
- Félix Demaría – Inter – 1932–33
- Germán Denis – Napoli, Udinese, Atalanta – 2008–16
- **Thomás de Martis** – **Parma** – 2026–
- Rodrigo De Paul – Udinese – 2016–21
- Oscar Dertycia – Fiorentina – 1989–90
- Mario Oscar Desiderio – Catania – 1960–62
- Gustavo Dezotti – Lazio, Cremonese – 1988–90, 1991–92, 1993–94
- Ángel Di María – Juventus – 2022–23
- Christian Díaz – Udinese – 2000–02
- Ramón Díaz – Napoli, Avellino, Fiorentina, Inter – 1982–89
- Vicente Di Paola – Roma – 1946–49
- Juán Docabo – Perugia – 1998–99
- **Benjamín Domínguez** – Bologna, **Sassuolo** – 2024–
- Nicolás Domínguez – Bologna – 2019–24
- Matias Donnet – Venezia – 2001–02
- **Paulo Dybala** – Palermo, Juventus, **Roma** – 2012–13, 2014–

== E ==
- Gonzalo Escalante – Lazio, Cremonese – 2020–23
- Juan Esnáider – Juventus – 1998–2000
- Iván Esperón – Roma – 1946–47
- Juan Esposto – Genoa – 1931–34, 1935–36
- Nahuel Estévez – Spezia, Parma – 2020–21, 2024–26
- Mario Evaristo – Genoa – 1935–36

== F ==
- Ernesto Farías – Palermo – 2004–05
- Alejandro Faurlín – Palermo – 2012–13
- Alberto Fazio – Lazio – 1940–43
- Federico Fazio – Roma, Salernitana – 2016–24
- Federico Fernández – Napoli – 2011–14
- Antonio Ferrara – Livorno, Napoli, Inter – 1934–38
- Domingo Ferraris – Torino – 1929–30
- Ignacio Fideleff – Napoli, Parma – 2011–13
- Luciano Figueroa – Genoa – 2007–10
- José Florio – Torino – 1951–52
- Mauro Formica – Palermo – 2012–13
- Élio Fortunato – Perugia – 1980–81
- Federico Freire – Catania – 2013–14

== G ==
- Fernando Gago – Roma – 2011–12
- Adolfo Gaich – Benevento, Verona – 2020–21, 2022–23
- Antonio Ganduglia – Genoa – 1932–33
- Santiago García – Palermo, Novara – 2010–13
- Tomás Garibaldi – Genoa – 1939–41
- Francisco Garraffa – Livorno – 1934–35, 1937–38
- Santiago Gentiletti – Lazio, Genoa – 2014–187
- Lautaro Gianetti – Udinese – 2023–25
- José Giarrizzo – Palermo, Pro Patria – 1953–55
- Alejandro Giglio – Genoa – 1930–32
- Hugo Giorgi – Bologna – 1947–49
- Alejandro Gómez – Catania, Atalanta, Monza – 2010–13, 2014–21, 2023–24
- Juanito Gomez – Verona – 2013–16
- Carlos Gonzáles – Lucchese – 1951–52
- Esteban González – Lazio – 2004–05
- Ezequiel González – Fiorentina – 2001–02
- Kily González – Inter – 2003–06
- Mariano González – Palermo, Inter – 2004–07
- **Nicolás González** – Fiorentina, **Juventus** – 2021–
- Pablo González – Siena – 2011–12
- Raúl González – Brescia – 2000–01, 2003–04
- Nicolás Gorobsov – Cesena – 2010–11
- Ernesto Grillo – Milan – 1957–60
- Leandro Grimi – Milan, Siena – 2006–08
- Salvador Gualtieri – Lazio – 1940–43, 1945–49
- Andrés Guglielminpietro – Milan, Inter, Bologna – 1998–2004
- Pablo Guiñazú – Perugia – 2000–01

== H ==
- Gabriel Hauche – Chievo – 2012–13
- Gabriel Heinze – Roma – 2011–12
- Patricio Hernández – Torino, Ascoli – 1982–85
- Gonzalo Higuaín – Napoli, Juventus, Milan – 2013–20
- Claudio Husaín – Napoli – 2000–01, 2002–03

== I ==
- Mauro Icardi – Sampdoria, Inter – 2012–19
- Gino Infantino – Fiorentina – 2023–24
- Mariano Julio Izco – Catania, Chievo, Crotone – 2006–15, 2016–18

== L ==
- Hugo Lamanna – Atalanta – 1941–43
- Erik Lamela – Roma – 2011–13
- Juán Landolfi – Inter – 1941–42
- Joaquín Larrivey – Cagliari – 2007–10, 2011–13
- Diego Latorre – Fiorentina – 1992–93
- Ezequiel Lavezzi – Napoli – 2007–12
- Pablo Ledesma – Catania – 2008–12
- Matías Lequi – Lazio – 2004–05
- Facundo Lescano – Torino – 2014–15
- Sebastián Leto – Catania – 2013–14
- Cristian Llama – Catania, Fiorentina – 2007–13
- Marcos Locatelli – Torino, Genoa – 1960–65
- Nicolás Lombardo – Roma – 1930–33
- Miguel Longo – Cagliari – 1964–69
- Claudio López – Lazio – 2000–04
- Lisandro López – Inter – 2017–18
- Maxi López – Catania, Milan, Sampdoria, Chievo, Torino, Udinese – 2009–18
- Juan Carlos Lorenzo – Sampdoria – 1948–52
- Néstor Lorenzo – Bari – 1989–90

== M ==
- José Macrí – Genoa – 1946–47
- Lisandro Magallán – Crotone – 2020–21
- Juan Maglio – Juventus – 1931–32
- Pedro Manfredini – Roma, Brescia, Venezia – 1959–68
- Diego Maradona – Napoli – 1984–91
- Hugo Maradona – Ascoli – 1987–88
- Carlos Marinelli – Torino – 2002–03
- Diego Markic – Bari – 1999–2001
- Gonzalo Maroni – Sampdoria – 2019–20
- Agustín Martegani – Salernitana – 2023–24
- Enrique Martegani – Padova, Palermo, Lazio – 1950–54, 1955–56
- **Lautaro Martínez** – **Inter** – 2018–
- Lucas Martínez Quarta – Fiorentina – 2020–25
- Oscar Massei – Inter, Triestina, Spal – 1955–68
- **Franco Mastantuono** – **Fiorentina** – 2026–
- Diego Mateo – Lecce – 2000–01
- Carlos Matheu – Cagliari, Atalanta – 2008–09, 2012–13
- José Mauri – Parma, Milan, Empoli – 2013–19
- Américo Menutti – Bari – 1942–43
- Rubens Merighi – Modena, Torino – 1962–64, 1967–68
- Raúl Mezzadra – Torino, Venezia – 1940–41, 1942–43
- Diego Milito – Genoa, Inter – 2008–14
- **Nahuel Molina** – Udinese, **Roma** – 2020–22, 2026–
- José Montagnoli – Spal – 1954–55
- Fabián Monzón – Catania – 2013–14
- Ángel Morales – Sampdoria – 1997–98
- Maxi Moralez – Atalanta – 2011–16
- Adolfo Morello – Padova – 1956–57
- **Matías Moreno** – Fiorentina, **Venezia** – 2024–25, 2026–
- Santiago Morero – Chievo – 2008–12
- Juan Carlos Morrone – Lazio, Fiorentina – 1960–61, 1963–67, 1969–71
- Ezequiel Muñoz – Palermo, Sampdoria, Genoa – 2010–13, 2014–17
- Mateo Musacchio – Milan, Lazio – 2017–21
- Franco Mussis – Genoa – 2014–15
- Juan Musso – Udinese, Atalanta – 2018–25

== N ==
- Roberto Nanni – Siena, Messina – 2005–06
- Nicolás Navarro – Napoli – 2007–09
- Mauro Navas – Udinese – 1997–2000
- Diego Novaretti – Lazio – 2013–15

== O ==
- Mauro Obolo – Piacenza – 2002–03
- Lucas Ocampos – Genoa, Milan – 2016–17
- Lucas Orbán – Genoa – 2016–17
- **Christian Ordóñez** – **Parma** – 2025–
- Rodolfo Orlandini – Genoa – 1930–34
- Ariel Ortega – Sampdoria, Parma – 1998–2000
- Aldo Osorio – Lecce – 2000–01
- Gabriel Oyola – Parma – 2003–04

== P ==
- Marcelo Pagani – Messina, Mantova – 1963–65
- Mario Paglialunga – Catania – 2012–13
- Rodrigo Palacio – Genoa, Inter, Bologna – 2009–21
- Tomás Palacios – Inter, Monza – 2024–25
- José Luis Palomino – Atalanta, Cagliari – 2017–25
- Miguel Ángel Pantó – Roma – 1939–43, 1945–47
- Leandro Paredes – Chievo, Roma, Empoli, Juventus – 2013–17, 2022–25
- Claudio París – Perugia – 2000–02
- Facundo Parra – Atalanta – 2012–13
- Pedro Pasculli – Lecce – 1985–86, 1988–91
- Daniel Passarella – Fiorentina, Inter – 1982–88
- Javier Pastore – Palermo, Roma – 2009–11, 2018–21
- Martín Payero – Udinese, Cremonese – 2023–26
- Nehuén Paz – Bologna, Lecce – 2018–21
- **Nico Paz** – **Como** – 2024–
- Marco Pellegrino – Milan, Salernitana – 2023–24
- **Mateo Pellegrino** – Parma, **Fiorentina** – 2024–
- Maximiliano Pellegrino – Atalanta, Cesena – 2007–11
- Gabriel Peñalba – Cagliari – 2006–07
- Luis Pentrelli – Udinese, Fiorentina – 1957–63
- Roberto Pereyra – Udinese, Juventus– 2011–16, 2020–24
- Osvaldo Peretti – Roma – 1947–48
- Nehuén Pérez – Udinese – 2021–25
- Diego Perotti – Genoa, Roma, Salernitana – 2014–20, 2021–22
- **Máximo Perrone** – **Como** – 2024–
- German Pezzella – Fiorentina – 2017–21
- Gino Peruzzi – Catania– 2013–14
- Ignacio Piatti – Lecce – 2010–12
- **Santiago Pierotti** – **Lecce** – 2023–
- Iván Pillud – Verona – 2013–14
- Héctor Pineda – Udinese, Napoli – 1997–2002
- Anselmo Pisa – Lazio – 1940–41
- Silvestro Pisa – Lazio – 1939–43
- Pedro Pompei – Sampdoria – 1939–40
- Franco Ponzinibio – Inter, Genoa – 1932–33, 1935–37
- José Ponzinibio – Milan – 1930–31
- Victor José Pozzo – Inter, Atalanta – 1939–42
- Juan Pratto – Genoa – 1930–34, 1935–36
- Lucas Pratto – Genoa – 2011–12
- Francisco Provvidente – Roma – 1939–41
- Ignacio Pussetto – Udinese, Sampdoria – 2018–23

== Q ==
- Facundo Quiroga – Napoli – 2000–01

== R ==
- Fernando Redondo – Milan – 2002–04
- Gustavo Reggi – Reggina – 1999–2001
- Adrián Ricchiuti – Catania – 2009–13
- Emiliano Rigoni – Atalanta, Sampdoria – 2018–20
- Fabián Rinaudo – Catania – 2013–14
- Leonel Rios – Reggina – 2006–07
- Emanuel Rivas – Bari– 2009–11
- Juan Salvador Rizzo – Inter – 1935–36
- José Rodríguez – Salernitana – 1947–48
- Gonzalo Rodríguez – Fiorentina – 2012–17
- Leonardo Rodríguez – Atalanta – 1992–94
- Matías Rodríguez – Sampdoria – 2012–13
- Esteban Rolón – Genoa – 2018–19
- Cristian Romero – Genoa, Atalanta – 2018–21
- **David Romero** – **Parma** – 2026–
- Luka Romero – Lazio, Milan – 2021–24
- Sergio Romero – Sampdoria, Venezia – 2012–13, 2014–15, 2021–22
- Facundo Roncaglia – Fiorentina, Genoa – 2012–16
- Ángel Rosso – Alessandria – 1946–47
- Américo Ruffino – Palermo – 1932–33
- Oscar Ruggeri – Ancona – 1992–93

== S ==
- Mario Sabbatella – Sampdoria, Triestina, Atalanta – 1949–56
- Diego Saja – Brescia – 2003–04
- Walter Samuel – Roma, Inter – 2000–04, 2005–14
- Juan Sánchez Miño – Torino – 2014–15
- Mario Alberto Santana – Venezia, Chievo, Palermo, Fiorentina, Napoli, Cesena, Torino, Genoa – 2001–02, 2003–14
- Beniamino Santos – Torino, Pro Patria – 1949–52
- Javier Saviola – Verona – 2014–15
- Lionel Scaloni – Lazio, Atalanta – 2007–08, 2009–15
- René Seghini – Bologna – 1956–57
- Roberto Sensini – Udinese, Parma, Lazio – 1989–90, 1992–2006
- Adalberto Sifredi – Salernitana – 1947–48
- Jonathan Silva – Roma – 2017–18
- Matías Silvestre – Catania, Palermo, Inter, Milan, Sampdoria, Empoli – 2007–19
- Diego Simeone – Pisa, Inter, Lazio – 1990–91, 1997–2003
- **Giovanni Simeone** – Genoa, Fiorentina, Cagliari, Verona, Napoli, **Torino** – 2016–
- Santiago Solari – Inter – 2005–08
- Juan Pablo Sorín – Juventus, Lazio – 1995–96, 2002–03
- José Sosa – Napoli, Milan – 2010–11, 2016–17
- Roberto Sosa – Udinese, Napoli – 1998–2002, 2007–08
- Víctor Sotomayor – Verona – 1989–90
- **Matías Soulé** – Juventus, Frosinone, **Roma** – 2021–
- José Spirolazzi – Milan – 1935–36
- Cataldo Spitale – Roma – 1939–41
- Nicolás Spolli – Catania, Roma, Carpi, Chievo, Genoa – 2009–19
- Guillermo Stábile – Genoa, Napoli – 1930–31, 1932–36
- Andrés Stagnaro – Roma – 1933–35
- José Surano – Salernitana – 1947–48

== T ==
- Juan Tacchi – Torino, Alessandria, Napoli – 1956–61, 1962–63, 1965–66
- Leonardo Talamonti – Lazio, Atalanta – 2004–05, 2006–10
- Carlos Tevez – Juventus – 2013–15
- Fernando Tissone – Udinese, Atalanta, Sampdoria – 2004–11, 2012–13
- Pedro Troglio – Verona, Lazio, Ascoli – 1988–92
- **Mariano Troilo** – **Parma** – 2025–
- Roberto Trotta – Roma – 1996–97

== V ==
- Juan Vairo – Juventus – 1955–56
- **Lautaro Valenti** – **Parma** – 2020–21, 2024–
- Nahuel Valentini – Livorno – 2013–14
- Nicolás Valentini – Verona – 2024–26
- José Valle – Roma – 1947–50
- Leonel Vangioni – Milan – 2016–17
- Franco Vázquez – Palermo, Cremonese – 2011–12, 2014–16, 2025–26
- Juan Carlos Verdeal – Genoa – 1946–49
- Santiago Vernazza – Palermo, Milan, Vicenza – 1956–57, 1959–63
- Juan Sebastián Verón – Sampdoria, Parma, Lazio, Inter – 1996–2001, 2004–06
- Ricardo Matias Verón – Reggina – 2000–01, 2002–03, 2004–05
- Sallustiano Vidál – Lazio – 1947–48
- Nelson Vivas – Inter – 2001–03
- Carlos Volante – Napoli, Torino – 1931–32, 1933–34

== Y ==
- Andrés Yllana – Brescia – 2000–02

== Z ==
- Javier Zanetti – Inter – 1995–2014
- Mauro Zárate – Lazio, Inter, Fiorentina – 2008–13, 2015–17
- Sergio Zárate – Ancona – 1992–93
- Luciano Zavagno – Ancona – 2003–04
- **Exequiel Zeballos** – **Monza** – 2026–
- Bruno Zuculini – Verona – 2017–18
- Franco Zuculini – Genoa, Bologna, Verona – 2010–11, 2015–16, 2017–18

== See also ==
- List of foreign Serie A players
- List of Argentine footballers in Serie B
- Oriundo
- Serie A Foreign Footballer of the Year

== Notes ==
1. Born in France
2. Born in Mexico
3. Born in Spain
4. Capped for the Italy national football team
5. Capped for the Italy national under-18 football team
6. Capped for the Italy national under-17 football team
7. Capped for the Italy national under-16 football team
