= List of Argentine footballers in Serie B =

The list of Argentine men's footballers in Serie B records the association football players from Argentina who have appeared at least once for a team in the Italian Serie B. Entries in bold denote players still active in actual season.

== A ==
- Luciano Abecasis – Pescara – 2014–15
- Gonzalo Abrego – Cremonese – 2023–24
- Joel Acosta – Pescara – 2015–16
- Pepito Agosto – Livorno – 1935–36
- Luis Alfageme – Brescia, Grosseto, Ternana – 2006–07, 2009–14
- Bruno Amione – Reggina – 2021–22
- Federico Andrada – Bari – 2017–18
- Cristian Ansaldi – Parma – 2022–24
- Juan Antonio – Ascoli, Brescia, Sampdoria, Varese – 2010–14
- Sergio Bernardo Almirón – Verona, Empoli, Catania – 2003–05, 2014–15
- Carlos Dario Aurellio – Brescia, Cosenza – 1999–2001

== B ==
- Abel Balbo – Udinese – 1990–92
- Juan Barbas – Lecce – 1986–88
- Evaristo Barrera – Cremonese – 1945–46
- Carlos Barrionuevo – Salernitana – 2008–09
- Gabriel Batistuta – Fiorentina – 1993–94
- Carlos Bello – Taranto – 1993–94
- Nicolas Belloni – Pescara – 2020–21
- César Bertolo – Cremonese, Sanremese – 1936–37, 1938–40
- Domingo Bertolo – Sanremese – 1938–40
- Albano Bizzarri – Foggia, Perugia – 2018–19
- Silvio Bonino – Palermo – 1942–43
- Gabriel Miguel Bordi – Napoli – 1999–2000
- Rubén Botta – Bari – 2022–23
- Juan Brunetta – Parma – 2021–22

== C ==
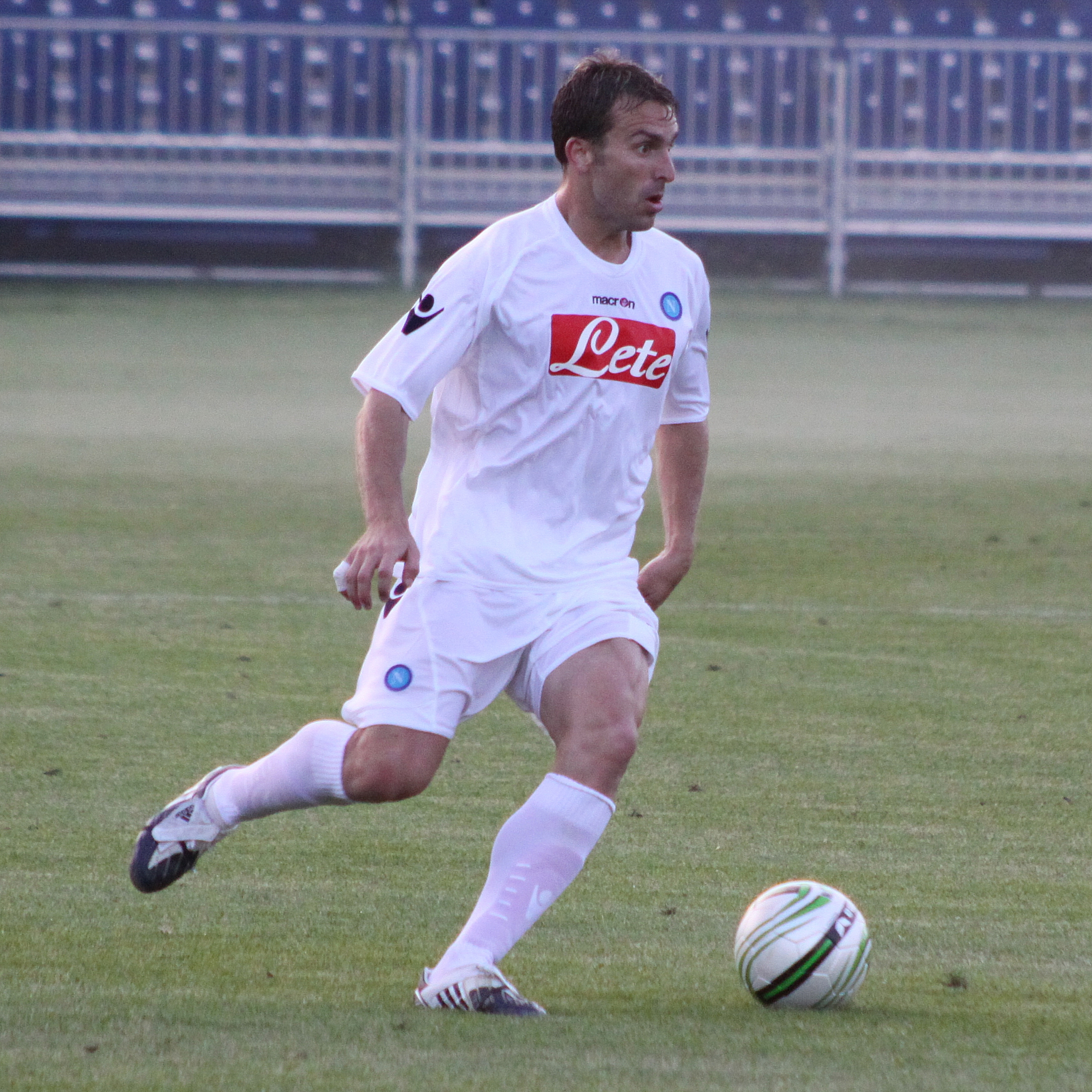
Campagnaro (here playing for Napoli in 2009) is one of Argentine most capped players in Serie B with 165 presences

- Fernando Cafasso – Treviso – 2008–09
- Adrián Calello – Catania – 2014–15
- Juán Calichio – Empoli – 1947–48
- Salvador Calvanese – Catania – 1966–67
- Hugo Campagnaro – Piacenza, Pescara – 2003–07, 2015–16, 2017–20
- Claudio Caniggia – Atalanta – 1999–2000
- Franco Carboni – Cagliari, Ternana, Empoli – 2022–24, 2025–26
- Luis Carniglia – Monza, Cesena – 1963–64, 1968–70
- Tiago Casasola – Como, Trapani, Salernitana, Cosenza, Frosinone, Cremonese, Perugia, Ternana – 2015–24
- José Ignacio Castillo – Frosinone, Pisa – 2006–08
- Lucas Castro – Catania, SPAL – 2014–15, 2020–21
- Maximiliano Cejas – Latina – 2013–14
- Sebastian Cejas – Siena, Ascoli, Fiorentina, Pisa – 2001–04, 2008–09
- Gastón Cellerino – Livorno – 2008–09, 2010–11, 2012–13
- Jose Chamot – Pisa – 1991–93
- **Leandro Chichizola** – Spezia, Perugia, Parma, **Modena** – 2014–17, 2021–
- José Compagnucci – Anconitana – 1946–48
- Santiago Colombatto – Cagliari, Trapani, Perugia, Verona – 2015–19
- Raúl Conti – Bari – 1961–62
- Lucas Correa – Varese 2010–11
- Juan Manuel Cruz – Cosenza – 2024–25
- Claudio Cuffa – Padova – 2009–14
- **Marcos Curado** – Crotone, Frosinone, Perugia, **Ascoli** – 2018–23, 2026–

== D ==
- Franco Da Dalt – Triestina – 2005–06, 2007–08
- Isaías Delpupo – Cagliari – 2022–23
- Germán Denis – Reggina – 2020–22
- Leandro Depetris – Brescia, Gallipoli – 2005–07, 2009–10
- Gustavo Dezotti – Cremonese – 1990–91, 1992–93
- Vicente Di Paola – Pisa – 1949–50
- Juan Docabo – Perugia – 1997–98
- Mariano Donda – Bari – 2007–09
- Paulo Dybala – Palermo – 2013–14

== E ==
- Horacio Erpen – Venezia, Triestina, Sassuolo, Juve Stabia – 2004–06, 2008–09, 2011–13
- Gonzalo Escalante – Catania – 2014–15
- Marcos Espeche – Reggiana – 2020–21
- Juán Esposto – Palermo – 1930–31
- **Nahuel Estévez** – Crotone, Parma, **Palermo** – 2021–24, 2026–

== F ==
- Emir Faccioli – Frosinone – 2010–11
- Cristian Fernández Parentini – Venezia, Spezia – 2003–04, 2007–08
- Mariano Fernández – Torino – 2003–04
- Franco Ferrari – Brescia, Livorno – 2018–20
- Domingo Ferraris – Torino – 1929–30
- Luciano Figueroa – Genoa – 2006–07
- Fabricio Fontanini – Vicenza – 2016–17
- Alejandro Frezzotti – Treviso – 2008–09

== G ==
- Luciano Galletti – Napoli – 1999–2000
- **Alejo Garnica** – **Catanzaro** – 2026–
- Francisco Garraffa – Livorno – 1935–37
- Matias Garavano – Gallipoli – 2009–10
- Carlos Garavelli – Casale – 1938–39
- **Federico Gattoni** – **Ascoli** – 2026–
- Emanuel Gigliotti – Novara – 2010–11
- Damián Giménez – Pescara – 2005–07
- **Papu Gómez** – **Padova** – 2025–
- Juanito Gómez Taleb – Triestina, Verona, Cremonese – 2005–06, 2011–13, 2016–18
- Pablo Andrés González – Novara – 2010–11, 2012–14, 2015–16
- Raúl Alberto González – Crotone, Salernitana, Cosenza – 2001–03
- Nicolas Gorobsov – Vicenza, Torino – 2007–11
- Ariel Damian Grana – Venezia – 2004–05
- Ariel Leo Griffo – Como – 2003–04
- Ruben Gerardo Grighini – Venezia, Vicenza – 2004–06
- Fausto Grillo – Trapani – 2019–20
- Salvador Gualtieri – Vicenza, Anconitana – 1949–51
- Juan Cruz Guasone – Salernitana – 2024–

== H ==
- Esteban José Herrera – Messina – 2003–04
- Claudio Husaín – Napoli – 2001–03

== I ==
- Mauro Icardi – Sampdoria – 2011–12
- **Julián Illanes** – Carrarese, **Arezzo** – 2024–
- Gaspar Iñíguez – Ascoli – 2018–19
- Emmanuel Interlandi – Messina – 1935–38
- Pablo Eduardo Islas – Venezia – 2003–04
- Mariano Julio Izco – Cosenza, Juve Stabia – 2018–20

== J ==
- Cristian Jeandet – Fidelis Andria – 1997–98

== L ==
- Christian La Grotteria – Palermo – 2001–03
- Santiago Ladino – Bari – 2007–08
- Juan Manuel Landaida – Venezia, Triestina – 2004–06
- Juán Landolfi – Padova, Viareggio – 1942–43, 1947–48
- Joaquín Larrivey – Cosenza, Südtirol – 2021–23
- Federico Raúl Laurito – Livorno, Empoli – 2008–09, 2010–11
- Leandro Lázzaro – Salernitana – 2001–02
- Emmanuel Ledesma – Salernitana, Crotone – 2008–09, 2010–11
- Facundo Lescano – Avellino – 2025–26
- Sebastián Leto – Catania – 2014–15
- Gaston Liendo – Venezia – 2003–04
- Marcos Locatelli – Genoa – 1965–68
- Nicolás Lombardo – Pisa – 1934–36
- Miguel Longo – Cagliari, Atalanta – 1962–64, 1969–70
- Lucas Longoni – Triestina – 2010–11
- Ariel López – Genoa – 1997–98
- Juán Carlos Lopez – Juve Stabia – 1951–52
- Maxi López – Crotone – 2019–20

== M ==
- Julián Magallanes – Vicenza, Cittadella – 2008–12
- Carlos Marinelli – Torino – 2004–05
- Diego Fernando Markic – Bari – 2001–04
- Enrique Martegani – Palermo – 1954–55
- Oscar Massei – SPAL – 1964–65
- Carlos Matheu – Siena – 2013–14
- Américo Menutti – Bari, Lecce – 1941–42
- Rubens Merighi – Modena – 1964–67, 1968–72
- Mariano Messera – Catania – 2004–05
- Raúl Mezzadra – Bari, Cesena – 1940–41, 1942–43
- Diego Milito – Genoa – 2004–05
- Matias Miramontes – Venezia, Ancona, Triestina – 2003–05, 2008–11
- Lucas Rodrigo Montero – Ternana – 2004–06
- Luciano Fabián Monzón – Catania – 2014–15
- Santiago Morero – Cesena, Siena, Avellino – 2012–14, 2017–18
- Juan Carlos Morrone – Lazio, Foggia, Avellino – 1961–63, 1967–69, 1973–74
- Ezequiel Muñoz – Palermo – 2013–14

== N ==
- Roberto Nanni – Crotone – 2006–07
- Federico Nieto – Verona – 2006–07
- Fabio Nigro – Lazio – 1987–88

== O ==
- Rodolfo Orlandini – Genoa – 1934–35
- Aldo Osorio – Crotone, Lecce – 2001–03

== P ==
- Rodrigo Palacio – Brescia – 2021–22
- Fernando Pandolfi – Perugia – 1997–98
- Pedro Pasculli – Lecce – 1986–88, 1991–92
- Nehuén Paz – Crotone – 2021–22
- Diego Peralta – Pisa, Ternana – 2016–17, 2021–22
- Sixto Peralta – Torino – 2000–01
- Gino Peruzzi – Catania – 2014–15
- Gonzalo Piermarteri – Catania – 2014–15
- Mauricio Pineda – Cagliari – 2002–03
- Pedro Pompei – Cremonese, Cosenza – 1941–48
- Franco Ponzinibio – Pisa – 1937–40
- Victor José Pozzo – Padova, Parma – 1942–43, 1946–48
- Juán Pratto – Genoa – 1934–35

== Q ==
- Diego Quintero – Salernitana – 2000–01
- Jorge Quinteros – Padova – 1997–98

== R ==
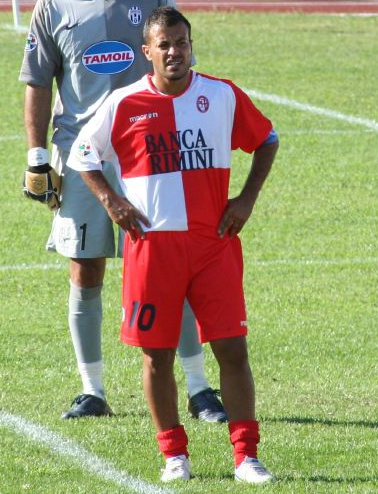
Ricchiuti is the top goalscorer in Serie B for Rimini with 35 goals.

- Diego Raimondi – Pisa – 2007–09
- Gustavo Reggi – Crotone, Reggina – 2000–02
- Tobías Reinhart – Spezia, Reggiana – 2019–20, 2023–26
- Pablo Ricchetti – Ternana – 2005–06
- Adrian Ricchiuti – Genoa, Pistoiese, Rimini – 1996–2001, 2005–09
- Lucas Roberto Rimoldi – Genoa, Frosinone – 2004–05, 2006–07
- Lautaro Rinaldi – Brescia – 2017–18
- Fabián Rinaudo – Catania – 2014–15
- Emanuel Benito Rivas – Bari, Varese, Verona, Spezia, Livorno – 2008–09, 2011–15
- Juan Salvador Rizzo – Pisa – 1936–37
- Braian Robert – Catanzaro – 2004–05
- José Rodríguez – Salernitana – 1948–49
- Leo Rodríguez – Atalanta – 1994–95
- Sergio Romero – Sampdoria – 2011–12
- Federico Rosso – Brescia – 2012–13
- Húgo Daniel Rubini – Ravenna – 1996–98
- Silvio Rudman – Padova – 1996–97

== S ==
- Mario Santana – Palermo, Frosinone – 2002–03, 2014–15
- Gastón Sauro – Catania – 2014–15
- Mateo Scheffer – Carrarese – 2024–25
- **Nicolás Schiavi** – Novara, **Carrarese** – 2015–16, 2017–18, 2024–
- Federico Scoppa – Vicenza – 2020–21
- Roberto Nestor Sensini – Udinese – 1990–92
- Adalberto Sifredi – Salernitana, Livorno – 1948–50
- Matías Silvestre – Livorno – 2019–20
- Diego Simeone – Pisa – 1991–92
- Lucas Simon – Piacenza – 2006–10
- Roberto Sosa – Ascoli, Messina, Napoli – 2003–04, 2006–07
- Víctor Sotomayor – Verona – 1990–91
- Claudio Spinelli – Crotone – 2018–19
- José Spirolazzi – Fanfulla Lodi – 1939–43
- Nicolás Spolli – Catania, Crotone – 2014–15, 2018–20
- José Surano – Cremonese – 1947–48

== T ==
- Juan Tacchi – Napoli – 1961–62, 1963–65
- Leonardo Talamonti – Atalanta – 2010–11
- Gregorio Tanco – Spezia – 2023–24
- Pedro Troglio – Ascoli – 1992–94
- Federico Turienzo – Salernitana – 2008–09

== V ==
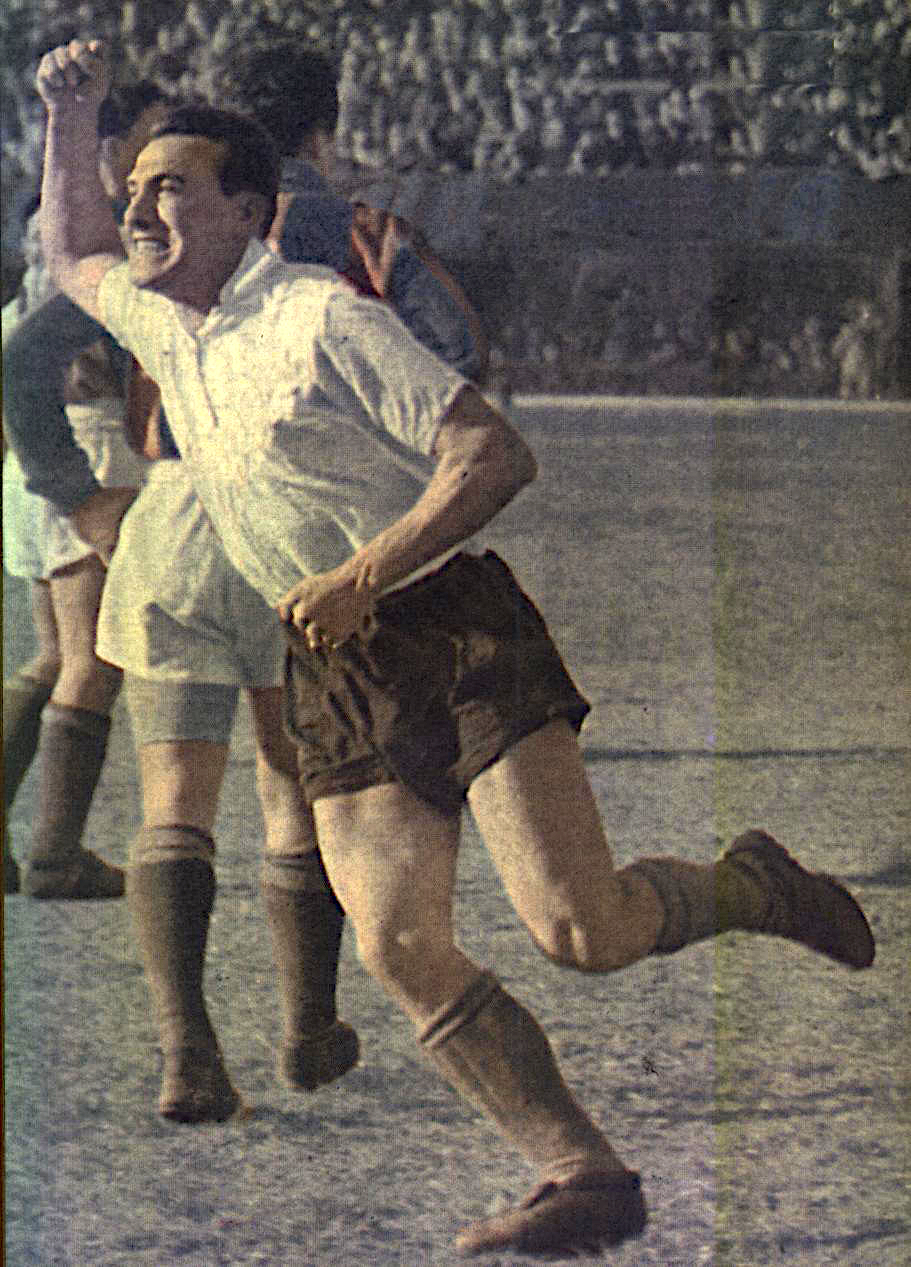
Santiago Vernazza was the first Argentine player to win goalscorers rank in Serie B in 1958–59 while playing for Palermo

- Lautaro Valenti – Parma – 2021–24
- Nahuel Valentini – Spezia, Ascoli, Vicenza – 2014–17, 2018–21
- Franco Vázquez – Palermo, Parma, Cremonese – 2013–14, 2021–25
- Santiago Vernazza – Palermo – 1957–59
- Ricardo Matias Veron – Reggina, Crotone, Salernitana – 2001–02, 2003–04, 2006–07
- Jonathan Vidallé – Cremonese – 1998–99
- Leonardo Raul Villa – Venezia, Triestina – 2004–06
- Ricardo Villar – Cesena – 2006–08
- Santiago Visentin – Crotone, Cittadella – 2021–23
- Carlos Volante – Livorno – 1932–33
- Agustín Vuletich – Salernitana – 2018–19

== Y ==
- Carlos Alberto Yaqué – Reggina – 1997–99
- Andrés Yllana – Brescia, Verona – 1999–2000, 2002–03

== Z ==
- Facundo Zabala – Venezia – 2022–23
- Mauro Zanotti – Ternana – 2003–05
- Mauro Zárate – Cosenza – 2022–23
- Luciano Zavagno – Catania, Pisa, Ancona, Torino – 2005–06, 2007–12
- Bruno Zuculini – Verona – 2016–17
- Franco Zuculini – Bologna, Verona, Venezia, SPAL – 2014–15, 2016–17, 2019–20, 2021–23

== See also ==
- List of foreign Serie B players
- List of Argentine footballers in Serie A

== Notes ==
1. Capped for the Italy national football team
2. Capped for the Italy national under-18 football team
