= List of Colo-Colo managers =

That article shows the list and details of the managers in their spells at Colo-Colo.

== History ==
During the club's early years, David Arellano, the team captain, effectively served as its coach. He was responsible for conducting training sessions, devising plays, analysing opponents and determining the players' positions on the pitch, drawing on methods he had observed in Uruguay while participating in the 1924 South American Championship. The players' physical training, meanwhile, was overseen by instructor Erasmo Vera.

Following Arellano's death in 1927, coaching responsibilities passed to the club's directors, with the president generally selecting the starting eleven and deciding the team's tactical approach. By the late 1920s, however, players such as Guillermo Saavedra and Guillermo Subiabre had gained considerable influence over technical decisions. This led to tensions with the board, including the resignation of president Carlos Cariola in 1929 after the players refused to follow his tactical instructions during a match against Argentina's Sportivo Buenos Aires. Between 1930 and 1931, the team was also coached in several friendly matches by Hungarian György Orth, who was then managing the Chile national football team and occasionally worked with other Chilean clubs, including Green Cross and Audax Italiano.

After an inconsistent 1931 season, the board, led by Cariola and Alberto Parodi, regained some control over the club's technical affairs. Following an institutional crisis in early 1932, however, footballing decisions were once again entrusted to the players, with first-team captain Guillermo Saavedra assuming responsibility and Víctor San Martín being hired to oversee physical training. Disputes between the board and the first-team squad continued beyond the end of the club's amateur era in 1933, at times resulting in threats of mass resignations from both sides.

During the second half of the 1930s, coaching duties alternated between professional managers and members of the playing squad, usually the captain. The first professional manager was Uruguayan Pedro Mazullo, appointed in 1936, while Arturo Torres fulfilled the role during 1937.

By the late 1930s, Hungarian coach Franz Platko had been appointed. Platko introduced the WM system to Chilean football, employing three defenders, two defensive midfielders, two attacking midfielders and three forwards, a tactical innovation that attracted considerable attention at the time. He also introduced man-marking through the so-called half-policía role—the player assigned to mark the opposing centre-forward—with José Pastene becoming one of its leading exponents.

== Chronology ==
Interim coaches appear in italics.

- (Chile) David Arellano (1925–1927)
- (Italy) José Rosetti (1927)
- (Chile) Guillermo Saavedra (1928–1929)
- (Chile) Waldo Sanhueza (1930)
- (Hungary) Jorge Orth (1930–1931)
- (Chile) Guillermo Saavedra (1931–1932)
- (Chile) Waldo Sanhueza (1933–1934)
- (Chile) Electo Pereda (1935)
- (Uruguay) Pedro Mazullo (1936)
- (Chile) Guillermo Saavedra (1936)
- (Chile) Arturo Torres (1937)
- (Chile) Electo Pereda (1938)
- (Argentina) Nicolás Lombardo (1939)
- (Hungary) Francisco Platko (1939)
- (Chile) Guillermo Saavedra (1940)
- (Hungary) Máximo Garay (1940)
- (Hungary) Francisco Platko (1941–1943)
- (Chile) Arturo Torres (1944)
- (Chile) Luis Tirado (1944–1945)
- (Hungary) Francisco Platko (1946)
- (Chile) Enrique Sorrel (1947–1948)
- (Chile) Francisco Hormazábal (1949)
- (Chile) Germán Reveco (1950)
- (Hungary) Francisco Platko (1950)
- (Chile) Luis Tirado (1951)
- (Argentina) José Luis Boffi (1952)
- (Hungary) Francisco Platko (1953–1954)
- (Chile) Jorge Robledo (1955)
- (Uruguay) Enrique Fernández (1955–1956)
- (Chile) Hugo Tassara (1957–1958)
- (Brazil) Flávio Costa (1959–1960)
- (Chile) Hernán Carrasco (1960–1962)
- (Chile) Carlos Ruz (1962)
- (Argentina) José Manuel Moreno (1962)
- (Chile) Hugo Tassara (1963)
- (Chile) Caupolicán Peña (1964)
- (Chile) Hugo Tassara (1964–1965)
- (Uruguay) José María Rodríguez (1965–1966)
- (Chile) Pedro Morales (1966)
- (Chile) Andrés Prieto (1966–1967)
- (Spain) (Chile) Francisco Molina (1968–1969)
- (Chile) Enrique Hormazábal (1969–1970)
- (Chile) Francisco Hormazábal (1970–1971)
- (Chile) Luis Álamos (1972–1974)
- (Chile) José Santos Arias (1974)
- (Chile) José González (1975)
- (Chile) Orlando Aravena (1975–1976)
- (Hungary) (Spain) Ferenc Puskás (1977)
- (Chile) Juan Soto (1977)
- (Chile) Sergio Navarro (1977–1978)
- (Chile) Alberto Fouillioux (1978)
- (Chile) Pedro Morales (1979–1980)
- (Chile) Pedro García (1981–1985)
- (Chile) Arturo Salah (1986–1990)
- (Chile) Eddio Inostroza (1990)
- (Croatia) Mirko Jozić (1990–1993)
- (Argentina) (Chile) Vicente Cantatore (1994)
- (Chile) Eddio Inostroza (1994)
- (Chile) Ignacio Prieto (1994)
- (Paraguay) Gustavo Benítez (1995–1998)
- (Chile) Martín Hoces & (Chile) Luis Muñoz (1997)
- (Brazil) Nelsinho Baptista (1999)
- (Chile) Carlos Durán (1999)
- (Uruguay) Fernando Morena (1999–2000)
- (Chile) Roberto Hernández (2001)
- (Chile) Jaime Pizarro (2002–2004)
- (Argentina) Ricardo Dabrowski (2004)
- (Argentina) Marcelo Espina (2005)
- (Argentina) Ricardo Dabrowski (2005)
- (Argentina) Claudio Borghi (2006–2008)
- (Chile) Fernando Astengo (2008)
- (Argentina) (Chile) Marcelo Barticciotto (2008–2009)
- (Paraguay) Gualberto Jara (2009)
- (Argentina) Hugo Tocalli (2009–2010)
- (Argentina) Diego Cagna (2010–2011)
- (Chile) Luis Pérez (2011)
- (Argentina) Américo Gallego (2011)
- (Chile) Luis Pérez (2011)
- (Chile) Marcelo Ramírez (2011)
- (Chile) Ivo Basay (2011–2012)
- (Chile) Luis Pérez (2012)
- (Argentina) Omar Labruna (2012–2013)
- (Chile) Hugo González (2013)
- (Paraguay) Gustavo Benítez (2013)
- (Chile) Héctor Tapia (2013–2015)
- (Chile) José Luis Sierra (2015–2016)
- (Chile) Hugo González (2016)
- (Argentina) Pablo Guede (2016–2018)
- (Chile) Agustín Salvatierra (2018)
- (Chile) Héctor Tapia (2018)
- (Chile) Mario Salas (2019–2020)
- (Paraguay) Gualberto Jara (2020)
- (Argentina) (Bolivia) Gustavo Quinteros (2020–2023)
- (Argentina) Jorge Almirón (2024–2025)
- (Argentina) Pablo Ricchetti (2025)
- (Chile) Hugo González & (Chile) Luis Pérez (2025)
- (Argentina) Fernando Ortiz (2025–)

== Most successful managers ==
The following table, shows the most successful managers according to the club's history (totals include competitive matches only):

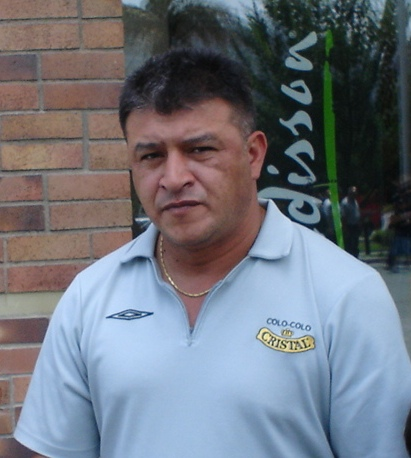
Claudio Borghi was the first coach in won fourth consecutives trophies.

Table correct as of 12 March 2013

Name	From	To	Games	Wins	Draws	Loss	Win %	Honours
(Hungary) Franz Platko	1939	1943 / 1953	85	58	14	13	68.24	1939 Campeonato Nacional; 1941 Campeonato Nacional; 1953 Campeonato Nacional
(Chile) Luis Álamos	1972	1975	153	93	35	25	60.78	1972 Campeonato Nacional; 1973 Copa Libertadores (*); 1974 Copa Chile
(Croatia) Mirko Jozić	1990	1993	134	83	38	13	61.94	1990 Campeonato Nacional; 1990 Copa Chile; 1991 Campeonato Nacional; 1991 Copa Libertadores; 1992 Recopa Sudamericana; 1992 Copa Interamericana; 1993 Campeonato Nacional
(Argentina) Claudio Borghi	2006	2008	133	75	32	26	56.39	2006 Torneo de Apertura; 2006 Torneo de Clausura; 2006 Copa Sudamericana (*); 2007 Torneo de Apertura; 2007 Torneo de Clausura

- (*): International tournament runner-up.
