= List of Chile national football team managers =

Chilean national football team managers

The following is a list of Chile national football team managers.

== Managers ==
This is the statistical table of Chile national football team managers and all matches against National Teams.
* To obtain the performance percentage (%), it is considered 3 points for a win, 1 point for a draw and 0 points for a loss.
* Honours from friendly tournaments are shown in cursive.
* Coaches at the FIFA World Cup are shown in bold.

As of 11 June 2025

| Manager | Nat | Career | G | W | D | L | GF | GA | GD | % | Honours |
|---|---|---|---|---|---|---|---|---|---|---|---|
| Vacancy (Note: Period with matches played with no manager or coach.) | | 1910–1913 | 5 | 0 | 0 | 5 | 2 | 16 | -14 | 0.00% | |
| Carlos Fanta | (Chile) | 1916 | 5 | 0 | 1 | 4 | 3 | 16 | -13 | 6.67% | |
| Julián Bértola | (Uruguay) | 1917 | 3 | 0 | 0 | 3 | 0 | 10 | -10 | 0.00% | |
| Vacancy | | 1917 | 1 | 0 | 1 | 0 | 1 | 1 | 0 | 33.33% | |
| Héctor Parra | (Chile) | 1918–1919 | 3 | 0 | 0 | 3 | 1 | 12 | -11 | 0.00% | |
| Juan Carlos Bertone | (Uruguay) | 1920–1922 | 10 | 0 | 3 | 7 | 5 | 20 | -15 | 10.00% | |
| Vacancy | | 1923–1924 | 3 | 0 | 0 | 3 | 1 | 9 | -8 | 0.00% | |
| Carlos Acuña | (Chile) | 1924 | 3 | 0 | 0 | 3 | 1 | 10 | -9 | 0.00% | |
| José Rosetti | (Italy) (Chile) | 1926 | 4 | 2 | 1 | 1 | 14 | 6 | +8 | 58.33% | |
| Vacancy | | 1927 | 1 | 0 | 0 | 1 | 2 | 3 | -1 | 0.00% | |
| Frank Powell | (England) | 1928 | 3 | 1 | 1 | 1 | 7 | 7 | 0 | 44.44% | |
| **György Orth** | (Hungary) | 1930 | 3 | 2 | 0 | 1 | 5 | 3 | +2 | 66.67% | |
| Joaquín Morales + Carlos Giudice | (Chile) + (Chile) | 1935 | 3 | 0 | 0 | 3 | 2 | 7 | -5 | 0.00% | |
| Pedro Mazullo | (Uruguay) | 1936–1939 | 10 | 3 | 1 | 6 | 24 | 27 | -3 | 33.33% | |
| Vacancy | | 1941 | 2 | 0 | 0 | 2 | 3 | 7 | -4 | 0.00% | |
| Máximo Garay | (Hungary) (Chile) | 1941 | 4 | 2 | 0 | 2 | 6 | 3 | +3 | 50.00% | |
| Franz Platko | (Hungary) | 1941–1945 | 12 | 5 | 2 | 5 (Note: Match vs. Argentina on 31 January 1942 (draw by 0–0) is counted as a loss by walkover due to Chile left the field after the 43rd min.) | 19 | 20 | -1 | 47.22% | |
| Luis Tirado | (Chile) | 1946–1949 | 19 | 8 | 2 | 9 | 32 | 38 | -6 | 45.61% | |
| José Luis Boffi + Waldo Sanhueza | (Argentina) + (Chile) | 1949 | did not manage matches against National Teams | | | | | | | | |
| Waldo Sanhueza | (Chile) | 1950 | did not manage matches against National Teams | | | | | | | | |
| Franz Platko + Waldo Sanhueza | (Hungary) + (Chile) | 1950 | 4 | 2 | 0 | 2 | 8 | 8 | 0 | 50.00% | |
| Franz Platko | (Hungary) | 1950 | did not manage matches against National Teams | | | | | | | | |
| **Alberto Buccicardi** | (Chile) | 1950 | 3 | 1 | 0 | 2 | 5 | 6 | -1 | 33.33% | |
| Luis Tirado | (Chile) | 1952–1953 | 12 | 7 (Note: Match vs. Bolivia on 28 March 1953 (draw by 2–2) is counted as a win by walkover due to unsportsmanlike behaviour of Bolivia.) | 1 | 4 | 26 | 18 | +8 | 61.11% | |
| Franz Platko | (Hungary) | 1953 | 3 | 1 | 0 | 2 | 3 | 8 | -5 | 33.33% | |
| Luis Tirado | (Chile) | 1954 | 4 | 0 | 0 | 4 | 1 | 10 | -9 | 0.00% | |
| Group of football leaders | (Chile) | 1954 | 2 | 1 | 0 | 1 | 4 | 5 | -1 | 50.00% | |
| Luis Tirado | (Chile) | 1955–1956 | 17 | 6 | 3 | 8 | 37 | 30 | +7 | 41.18% | |
| José Salerno | (Argentina) | 1956–1957 | 7 | 2 | 1 | 4 | 12 | 17 | -5 | 33.33% | |
| Ladislao Pakozdi | (Hungary) (Chile) | 1957 | 6 | 2 | 1 | 3 | 4 | 11 | -7 | 38.89% | 1957 Copa O'Higgins |
| **Fernando Riera** | (Chile) | 1957–1962 | 34 | 11 | 4 | 19 | 51 | 76 | -25 | 36.27% | **3rd place** **1962 FIFA World Cup** |
| Luis Álamos | (Chile) | 1962–1963 | 3 | 0 | 1 | 2 | 3 | 5 | -2 | 11.11% | |
| Francisco Hormazábal | (Chile) | 1963–1965 | 13 | 4 | 6 | 3 | 20 | 17 | +3 | 46.15% | 1965 Copa del Pacífico |
| **Luis Álamos** | (Chile) | 1965–1966 | 13 | 3 | 2 | 8 | 11 | 19 | -8 | 28.21% | 1966 Copa O'Higgins |
| Alejandro Scopelli | (Argentina) (Italy) | 1966–1967 | 12 | 5 | 3 | 4 | 22 | 19 | +3 | 50.00% | |
| Salvador Nocetti (Note: The assistant coach, Salvador Biondi, managed 2 matches.) | (Argentina) (Chile) | 1968–1969 | 18 | 7 | 6 | 5 | 23 | 23 | 0 | 50.00% | 1968 Copa del Pacífico |
| Francisco Hormazábal | (Chile) | 1970 | 2 | 0 | 0 | 2 | 1 | 7 | -6 | 0.00% | |
| Fernando Riera | (Chile) | 1970 | 1 | 0 | 0 | 1 | 1 | 5 | -4 | 0.00% | |
| Luis Vera + Raúl Pino | (Chile) + (Chile) | 1971 | 9 | 4 | 1 | 4 | 15 | 14 | +1 | 48.15% | 1971 Copa del Pacífico; 1971 Copa Juan Pinto Durán |
| Raúl Pino | (Chile) | 1971–1972 | 2 | 0 | 0 | 2 | 0 | 3 | -3 | 0.00% | |
| Rudi Gutendorf | (West Germany) | 1972–1973 | 8 (Note: Match vs. Tahiti on 14 February 1973 (win by 10-1) included.) | 4 | 0 | 4 | 20 | 16 | +4 | 50.00% | |
| **Luis Álamos** (Note: The assistant coach, Pedro Morales, managed 2 previous matches to the 1974 FIFA World Cup.) | (Chile) | 1973–1974 | 17 | 7 | 6 | 4 | 23 | 16 | +7 | 52.94% | 1973 Copa Carlos Dittborn; Copa Leoncio Provoste |
| Pedro Morales | (Chile) | 1974–1975 | 9 | 2 | 2 | 5 | 10 | 13 | -3 | 29.63% | 1974 Copa Acosta Ñu |
| Caupolicán Peña | (Chile) | 1976–1977 | 9 | 3 | 2 | 4 | 9 | 10 | -1 | 40.74% | |
| **Luis Santibáñez** | (Chile) | 1977–1982 | 38 | 14 | 10 | 14 (Note: Match vs. Spain on 4 July 1979 (loss by 0-1) included.) | 46 | 39 | +7 | 45.61% | 1979 Copa Juan Pinto Durán |
| Luis Ibarra | (Chile) | 1983 | 15 | 7 | 4 | 4 | 26 | 16 | +10 | 55.56% | 1983 Copa del Pacífico |
| Isaac Carrasco | (Chile) | 1984 | 1 | 0 | 1 | 0 | 0 | 0 | 0 | 33.33% | |
| Vicente Cantatore | (Argentina) (Chile) | 1984 | 1 | 1 | 0 | 0 | 1 | 0 | +1 | 100.00% | |
| Pedro Morales | (Chile) | 1985 | 19 | 8 | 6 | 5 | 27 | 22 | +5 | 52.63% | |
| Luis Ibarra | (Chile) | 1986 | 1 | 0 | 1 | 0 | 1 | 1 | 0 | 33.33% | |
| Orlando Aravena | (Chile) | 1987 | 7 | 5 | 0 | 2 | 13 | 6 | +7 | 71.43% | |
| Manuel Rodríguez | (Chile) | 1987 | 1 | 0 | 0 | 1 | 1 | 2 | -1 | 0.00% | |
| Orlando Aravena | (Chile) | 1988–1989 | 34 | 14 | 9 | 11 | 42 | 32 | +10 | 52.94% | 1988 Copa del Pacífico |
| Arturo Salah | (Chile) | 1990–1993 | 23 | 9 | 6 | 8 | 30 | 23 | +7 | 47.83% | Taça Expedito Teixeira |
| Nelson Acosta | (Uruguay) (Chile) | 1993 | 1 | 0 | 0 | 1 | 0 | 2 | -2 | 0.00% | |
| Mirko Jozić | (Croatia) | 1994 | 8 | 3 | 2 | 3 | 13 | 14 | -1 | 45.83% | |
| Xabier Azkargorta | (Spain) | 1995–1996 | 18 | 9 | 5 | 4 | 28 | 23 | +5 | 59.26% | 1995 Canada Cup |
| **Nelson Acosta** | (Uruguay) (Chile) | 1996–2000 | 66 | 24 (Note: Match vs. England "B" on 10 February 1998 (win by 2-1) included. It was managed by the assistant coach, Gustavo Huerta.) | 17 | 25 | 102 | 82 | +20 | 44.95% | Copa Ciudad de Valparaíso |
| Pedro García | (Chile) | 2001 | 12 | 3 | 1 | 8 | 11 | 19 | -8 | 27.78% | |
| Jorge Garcés | (Chile) | 2001 | 3 | 0 | 1 | 2 | 1 | 5 | -4 | 11.11% | |
| César Vaccia | (Chile) | 2002 | 1 | 0 | 0 | 1 | 0 | 2 | -2 | 0.00% | |
| Juvenal Olmos | (Chile) | 2003–2005 | 25 | 7 | 9 | 9 | 24 | 25 | -1 | 40.00% | |
| Nelson Acosta | (Uruguay) (Chile) | 2005–2007 | 28 | 13 | 8 | 7 | 35 | 38 | -3 | 55.95% | 2006 Copa del Pacífico |
| **Marcelo Bielsa** | (Argentina) | 2007–2011 | 51 | 28 | 8 | 15 | 69 | 49 | +20 | 60.13% | |
| Claudio Borghi (Note: The assistant coach, Jaime Vera, managed 1 friendly match and 3 official matches from 2014 World Cup qualification.) | (Argentina) (Chile) | 2011–2012 | 27 | 11 | 5 | 11 | 40 | 40 | 0 | 46.91% | 2012 Copa del Pacífico |
| **Jorge Sampaoli** | (Argentina) | 2012–2016 | 44 | 27 | 9 | 8 | 89 | 44 | +45 | 68.18% | **2015 Copa América** |
| Juan Antonio Pizzi | (Argentina) (Spain) | 2016–2017 | 32 | 13 | 7 | 12 | 48 | 36 | +12 | 47.92% | 2017 China Cup; **Copa América Centenario** |
| Reinaldo Rueda | (Colombia) (Honduras) | 2018–2021 | 27 | 9 | 8 | 10 | 35 | 35 | 0 | 43.21% | |
| Martín Lasarte | (Uruguay) | 2021–2022 | 22 | 7 | 6 | 9 | 21 | 28 | -7 | 40.91% | |
| Eduardo Berizzo | (Argentina) | 2022–2023 | 15 | 4 | 5 | 6 | 16 | 17 | -1 | 37.78% | |
| Nicolás Córdova | (Chile) | 2023 | 1 | 0 | 0 | 1 | 0 | 1 | -1 | 0.00% | |
| Ricardo Gareca | (Argentina) | 2024–2025 | 16 | 4 | 4 | 8 | 20 | 20 | 0 | 33.33% | |
