= List of CR Flamengo foreign football players =

This is a list of all time foreign players who have signed professional contracts with Flamengo. Up to now, Flamengo has had 102 foreign players from 25 throughout its history.

- Players in **bold** currently still play for the club.
- ^{†} Include friendlies and unofficial matches.
- ^{1} Includes Friendlies, FIFA Club World Cup, FIFA Intercontinental Cup Intercontinental Cup, Recopa Sudamericana, Supercopa Libertadores, Copa Mercosur, Copa de Oro, Supercopa do Brasil, Primeira Liga, Torneio Rio-São Paulo, Torneio do Povo.
- ^{*} Includes only Friendlies.

Last updated on 17 December 2025.

	Nation	Name	Club career	League		Copa do Brasil		Copa Libertadores		Copa Sudamericana		Carioca		Other^{1}		Total	
	Nation	Name	Club career	Apps	Goals	Apps	Goals	Apps	Goals	Apps	Goals	Apps	Goals	Apps	Goals	Apps	Goals
1	(Paraguay)	Modesto Bria^{†}	1943–1953	–	–	–	–	–	–	–	–	–	–	–	–	369	8
2	(Uruguay)	**Giorgian de Arrascaeta**	2019–	164	55	33	8	64	10	–	–	71	18	20	7	352	98
3	(Paraguay)	Sinforiano Garcia^{†}	1949–1958	–	–	–	–	–	–	–	–	–	–	–	–	276	0
4	(Argentina)	Horácio Doval^{†}	1969–1975	83	14	–	–	–	–	–	–	117	–	62	–	262	94
5	(Paraguay)	Francisco Reyes^{†}	1967–1973	39	–	–	–	–	–	–	–	79	–	82	–	200	7
6	(Serbia)	Dejan Petković^{†}	2000–2002; 2009–2011	98	31	11	–	11	–	2	–	38	–	38	–	198	57
7	(Colombia)	Gustavo Cuéllar	2016–2019	78	0	20	1	18	0	12	1	35	0	4	0	167	2
8	(Argentina)	Carlos Volante^{†}	1938–1943	–	–	–	–	–	–	–	–	–	–	–	–	164	4
9	(Argentina)	**Agustín Rossi**	2023–	86	0	7	0	23	0	–	–	20	0	8	0	144	0
10	(Argentina)	Agustín Valido^{†}	1937–1944	–	–	–	–	–	–	–	–	–	–	–	–	143	45
11	(Chile)	**Erick Pulgar**	2022–	70	3	13	0	19	0	–	–	26	0	10	0	138	3
12	(England)	Sidney Pullen^{†}	1915–1925	–	–	–	–	–	–	–	–	–	–	–	–	131	49
13	(Uruguay)	**Guillermo Varela**	2022–	47	1	14	1	24	1	–	–	28	1	10	0	123	4
14	(Paraguay)	Jorge Benítez^{†}	1952–1956	–	–	–	–	–	–	–	–	–	–	–	–	114	76
15	(Peru)	Paolo Guerrero	2015–2018	61	19	13	4	6	2	5	0	24	15	4	3	113	43
16	(Spain)	José Ufarte^{†}	1961; 1962–1964	–	–	–	–	–	–	–	–	–	–	–	–	106	15
17	(Uruguay)	Sergio Ramírez^{†}	1977–1979	32	0	–	–	–	–	–	–	27	0	35	2	94	2
18	(Chile)	Gonzalo Fierro	2008–2011	47	1	7	0	6	0	3	0	29	1	1	0	93	2
19	(Argentina)	Darío Bottinelli	2011–2012	47	6	4	0	8	2	3	0	22	0	5	3	90	11
20	(Argentina)	Héctor Canteros	2014–2018	60	4	12	0	0	0	0	0	16	1	–	–	88	5
19	(Chile)	Mauricio Isla	2020–2022	50	3	6	0	17	1	0	0	9	0	1	0	83	4
20	(Colombia)	Orlando Berrío	2017–2020	44	3	8	1	6	0	4	1	16	1	3	1	81	7
21	(Qatar)	Emerson	2009; 2015–2016	46	12	10	3	0	0	8	2	12	4	–	–	76	21
23	(Chile)	Claudio Maldonado	2009–2012	38	1	3	0	7	0	2	0	25	0	1	0	75	1
24	(Chile)	Marcos González	2012–2014	45	2	8	0	5	0	0	0	16	0	–	–	74	2
24	(Germany)	Fritz Engel^{†}	1936–1938	–	–	–	–	–	–	–	–	–	–	–	–	74	23
24	(Peru)	Miguel Trauco	2017–2019	34	1	5	0	8	2	7	0	20	1	1	0	74	4
24	(Uruguay)	**Nicolás de la Cruz**	2024–	33	2	6	0	14	1	–	–	16	0	5	0	74	3
28	(Paraguay)	Víctor Cáceres	2012–2015	48	1	12	1	3	1	0	0	16	0	4	0	72	3
29	(Argentina)	Ubaldo Fillol^{†}	1984–1985	34	0	–	–	10	0	–	–	21	0	6	0	71	0
30	(Uruguay)	Jorge Manicera^{†}	1967–1970	15	0	–	–	–	–	–	–	29	0	26^{*}	0	70	0
31	(Argentina)	Maxi Biancucchi	2007–2009	45	5	1	1	2	0	0	0	21	1	0	0	69	7
31	(Ecuador)	**Gonzalo Plata**	2024–	38	5	7	1	9	0	–	–	8	1	7	0	69	7
33	(Argentina)	Federico Mancuello	2016–2017	29	5	4	1	6	0	3	0	23	4	1	0	66	10
33	(Argentina)	Alejandro Mancuso^{†}	1996–1997	13	0	7	0	–	–	–	–	26	3	20	2	66	5
35	(Poland)	Roger Guerreiro	2004	36	3	–	–	–	–	–	–	–	–	–	–	63	11
36	(Paraguay)	Robert Piris Da Motta	2018–2021	42	0	2	0	6	0	0	0	6	0	1	0	57	0
36	(Argentina)	Eusébio Chamorro^{†}	1953–1956	–	–	–	–	–	–	–	–	–	–	–	–	55	0
38	(Chile)	Arturo Vidal	2022–2023	21	2	8	0	10	0	–	–	7	0	5	0	51	2
39	(Croatia)	Eduardo da Silva	2014–2015	27	10	9	2	–	–	–	–	10	1	–	–	46	13
40	(Argentina)	Alfredo González^{†}	1940	–	–	–	–	–	–	–	–	–	–	–	–	45	31
41	(Argentina)	Lucas Mugni	2014–2016	26	2	3	0	3	0	0	0	9	3	0	0	41	5
41	(Argentina)	Rogelio Domínguez^{†}	1968–1969	–	–	–	–	–	–	–	–	–	–	–	–	41	0
43	(Colombia)	Fernando Uribe	2018–2019	20	6	2	0	3	1	0	0	12	1	0	0	37	8
44	(Colombia)	Marlos Moreno	2018	21	1	5	0	5	0	–	–	4	0	0	0	36	1
45	(Paraguay)	César Ramírez	2005–2006	16	5	6	1	0	0	0	0	7	3	3	2	32	11
45	(Argentina)	Átmio Villa^{†}	1937–1938	–	–	–	–	–	–	–	–	–	–	–	–	32	0
45	(Uruguay)	**Matías Viña**	2024–	17	0	4	0	5	1	–	–	5	0	1	0	32	1
48	(Italy)	**Jorginho**	2025–	17	3	1	0	6	0	–	–	–	–	7	2	31	5
49	(Paraguay)	Carlos Gamarra^{†}	2000–2002	4	1	4	0	0	0	0	0	12	0	10	0	30	1
49	(Spain)	Pablo Marí	2019–2020	22	2	0	0	6	1	–	–	0	0	2	0	30	3
51	(Argentina)	Agustin Cosso^{†}	1937	–	–	–	–	–	–	–	–	–	–	–	–	28	20
51	(Paraguay)	Carlos Monín^{†}	1960	–	–	–	–	–	–	–	–	–	–	–	–	28	0
53	(Argentina)	Arcadio López^{†}	1937–1938	–	–	–	–	–	–	–	–	–	–	–	–	26	0
54	(Argentina)	Francisco Provvidente^{†}	1938	–	–	–	–	–	–	–	–	3	1	21	8	24	9
54	(Spain)	**Saúl Ñíguez**	2025–	16	0	2	0	4	0	–	–	–	–	2	0	24	0
56	(Colombia)	**Jorge Carrascal**	2025–	15	2	–	–	5	0	–	–	–	–	3	0	23	2
57	(Bolivia)	Marcelo Moreno	2013–2014	16	2	4	2	–	–	–	–	–	–	–	–	20	4
57	(Uruguay)	Horacio Peralta^{†}	2006	8	2	4	1	–	–	–	–	3	0	5	1	20	4
59	(England)	Lawrence Andrews^{†}	1912–1913; 1915; 1919	–	–	–	–	–	–	–	–	17	3	2	0	19	3
59	(Spain)	Talladas^{†}	1937	–	–	–	–	–	–	–	–	3	0	16	0	19	0
59	(Argentina)	Carlos Alcaraz	2024–2025	14	2	3	0	1	0	–	–	1	1	–	–	19	3
62	(Portugal)	Liédson	2002–2003; 2012–2013	17	4	–	–	–	–	–	–	–	–	–	–	17	4
62	(Argentina)	Alejandro Badassini^{†}	1916–1020	–	–	–	–	–	–	–	–	12	7	5	0	17	7
64	(Italy)	Francisco Miceli^{†}	1946–1947	–	–	–	–	–	–	–	–	1	0	14	0	15	0
64	(Ecuador)	Wagner Rivera^{†}	1996	11	0	–	–	–	–	–	–	–	–	4	0	15	0
66	(England)	Harry Reid^{†}	1916	–	–	–	–	–	–	–	–	11	4	3	0	14	4
67	(Poland)	Mariusz Piekarski^{†}	1997	10	0	–	–	–	–	–	–	–	–	3	0	13	0
68	(Uruguay)	Darío Pereyra^{†}	1988	11	0	–	–	–	–	–	–	–	–	1	0	12	0
69	(Argentina)	Alejandro Donatti	2016–2017	2	0	0	0	1	0	1	0	5	0	2	0	11	0
69	(Argentina)	Arturo Naón^{†}	1939	–	–	–	–	–	–	–	–	7	2	4	1	11	3
69	(Argentina)	Raimundo Orsi^{†}	1939–1940	–	–	–	–	–	–	–	–	3	0	8	2	11	2
69	(Argentina)	Sabino Coletta^{†}	1944–1945	–	–	–	–	–	–	–	–	5	0	6	0	11	0
73	(Argentina)	Rafael Sanz^{†}	1944–1945	–	–	–	–	–	–	–	–	–	–	–	–	10	7
73	(Argentina)	Ricardo Alarcón^{†}	1942–1944	–	–	–	–	–	–	–	–	2	0	8	5	10	5
75	(Argentina)	Julio Castillo^{†}	1940	–	–	–	–	–	–	–	–	2	0	7	6	9	6
75	(Argentina)	Jorge Paolino^{†}	1976–1977	2	0	–	–	–	–	–	–	1	0	6	0	9	0
77	(Ecuador)	Frickson Erazo	2014	2	0	0	0	0	0	–	–	5	0	–	–	7	0
77	(Canada)	Emilio Reuben^{†}	1941–1942	–	–	–	–	–	–	–	–	3	0	4	4	7	4
77	(Argentina)	Rubens Sambueza	2008	7	0	–	–	–	–	–	–	–	–	–	–	7	0
77	(Colombia)	Cristian Martínez Borja	2010	7	0	–	–	–	–	–	–	–	–	–	–	7	0
77	(Colombia)	Richard Ríos	2020–2022	1	0	0	0	0	0	–	–	6	0	–	–	7	0
82	(Uruguay)	Humberto Buchelli^{†}	1945	–	–	–	–	–	–	–	–	–	–	6	1	6	1
82	(Argentina)	Claudio Borghi^{†}	1989	4	0	–	–	–	–	–	–	–	–	2	0	6	0
84	(Argentina)	Alfredo De Terán^{†}	1944–1945	–	–	–	–	–	–	–	–	–	–	–	–	5	0
84	(Paraguay)	Diego Gavilán	2008	–	–	–	–	1	0	–	–	4	0	–	–	5	0
84	(Argentina)	Hugo Colace	2007–2008	3	0	–	–	–	–	–	–	2	0	–	–	5	0
84	(England)	Henry Welfare^{†}	1915–1916	–	–	–	–	–	–	–	–	–	–	5	7	5	7
84	(Nigeria)	Shola Ogundana	2024–2025	1	0	–	–	–	–	–	–	4	0	–	–	5	0
89	(Colombia)	Pablo Armero	2015	4	0	–	–	–	–	–	–	–	–	0	0	4	0
89	(Portugal)	Rui Loio^{†}	1965	–	–	–	–	–	–	–	–	1	0	3	0	4	0
89	(Mozambique)	Carlos Jorge^{†}	1970–1971	–	–	–	–	–	–	–	–	3	0	1	0	4	0
89	(Paraguay)	Juan Daniel Cáceres^{†}	1998	–	–	–	–	–	–	–	–	–	–	4	0	4	0
93	(Argentina)	Darío Conca	2017	2	0	–	–	–	–	0	0	–	–	1	0	3	0
94	(Uruguay)	Carlos Mendoza^{†}	1966–1967	–	–	–	–	–	–	–	–	–	–	2^{*}	0	2	0
94	(Hungary)	Flórian Albert^{†}	1967	–	–	–	–	–	–	–	–	–	–	2	0	2	0
94	(Slovakia)	Peter Timko^{†}	1950	–	–	–	–	–	–	–	–	–	–	2	0	2	0
94	(Sweden)	Rimbo^{†}	1966–1967	–	–	–	–	–	–	–	–	–	–	2	0	2	0
94	(Paraguay)	Santiago Ocampos	2022–2024	–	–	–	–	–	–	–	–	2	0	–	–	2	0
99	(Algeria)	Haraoui Nino^{†}	1993	–	–	–	–	–	–	–	–	–	–	1^{*}	0	1	0
100	(Sweden)	Kurt Axelsson	1966	–	–	–	–	–	–	–	–	–	–	–	–	0	0
100	(Peru)	Jorge Soto	2000	–	–	–	–	–	–	–	–	–	–	–	–	0	0
100	(Sierra Leone)	Aluspah Brewah	2004	–	–	–	–	–	–	–	–	–	–	–	–	0	0
100	(Argentina)	Joaquín Freitas	2026–	–	–	–	–	–	–	–	–	–	–	–	–	0	0
100	(Ecuador)	Anthony Valencia	2026–	–	–	–	–	–	–	–	–	–	–	–	–	0	0

== Number of foreigners by country ==
During history Flamengo had 102 players from 25 different countries signing a professional contract with the club or being member of the top team, in which only three failed to have a single appearance, Kurt Axelsson, Jorge Soto and Aluspah Brewah. The club also had five Brazilian born players that chosen to represent a different country during their careers, Emerson (Qatar), Roger Guerreiro (Poland), Eduardo da Silva (Croatia), Liédson (Portugal) and Jorginho (Italy).

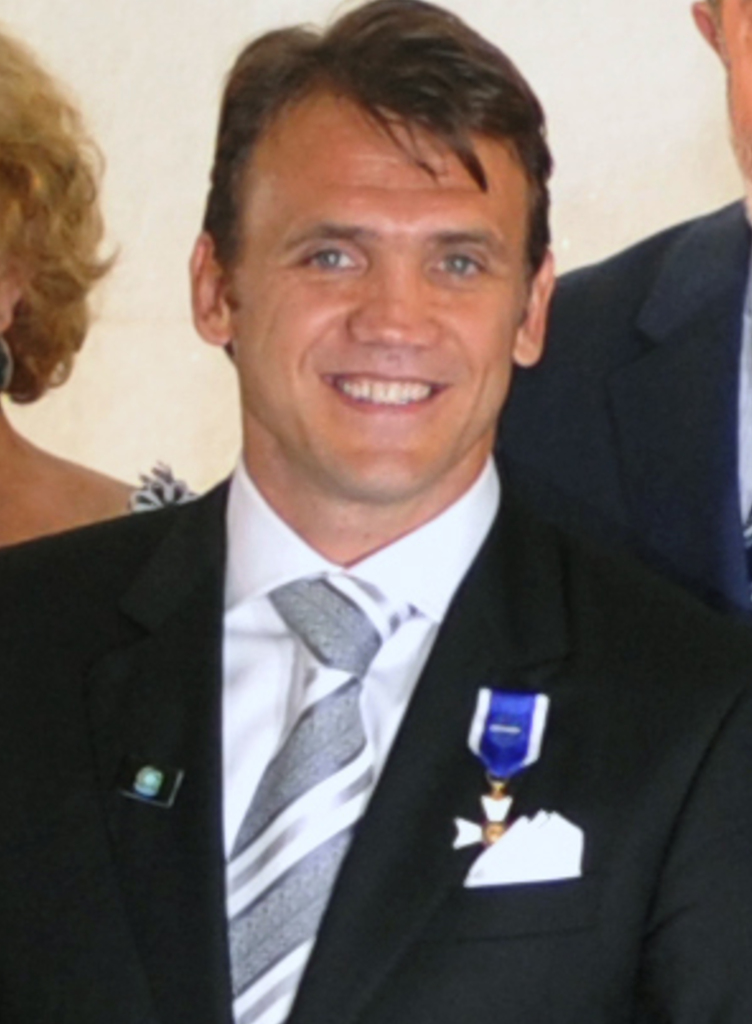
Dejan Petković, the non South American with more appearances and goals.

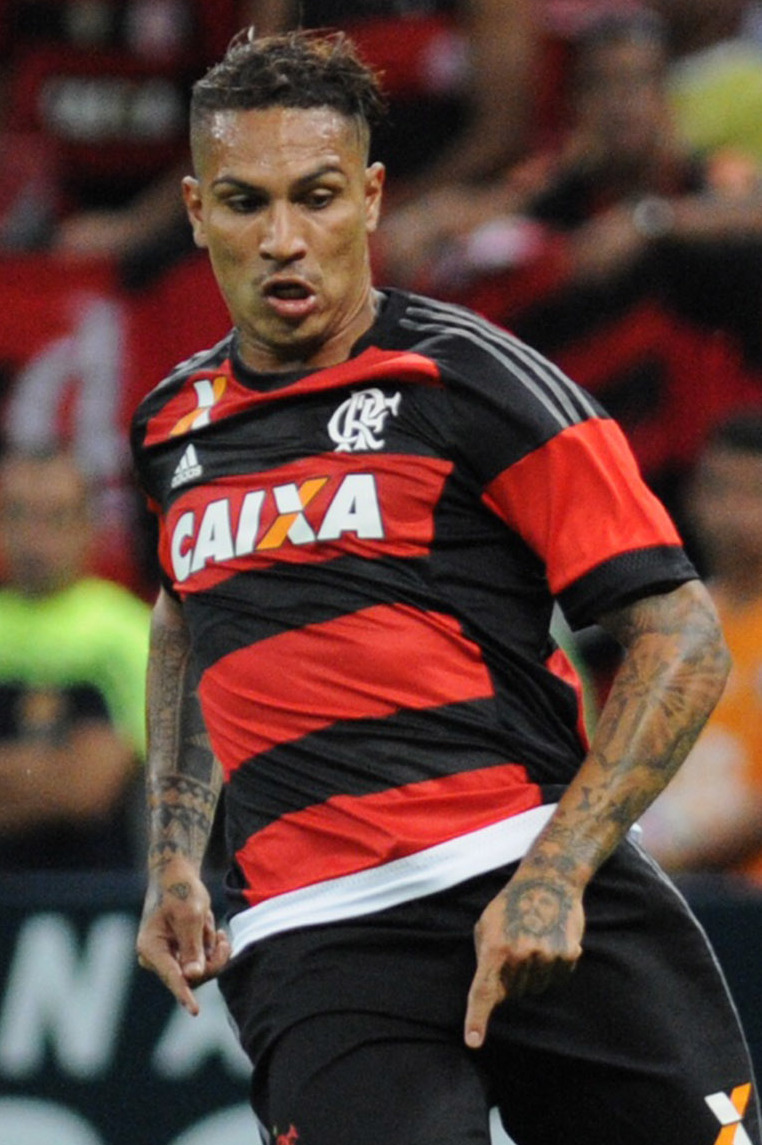
Paolo Guerrero, one of the three Peruvians in Flamengo's history.

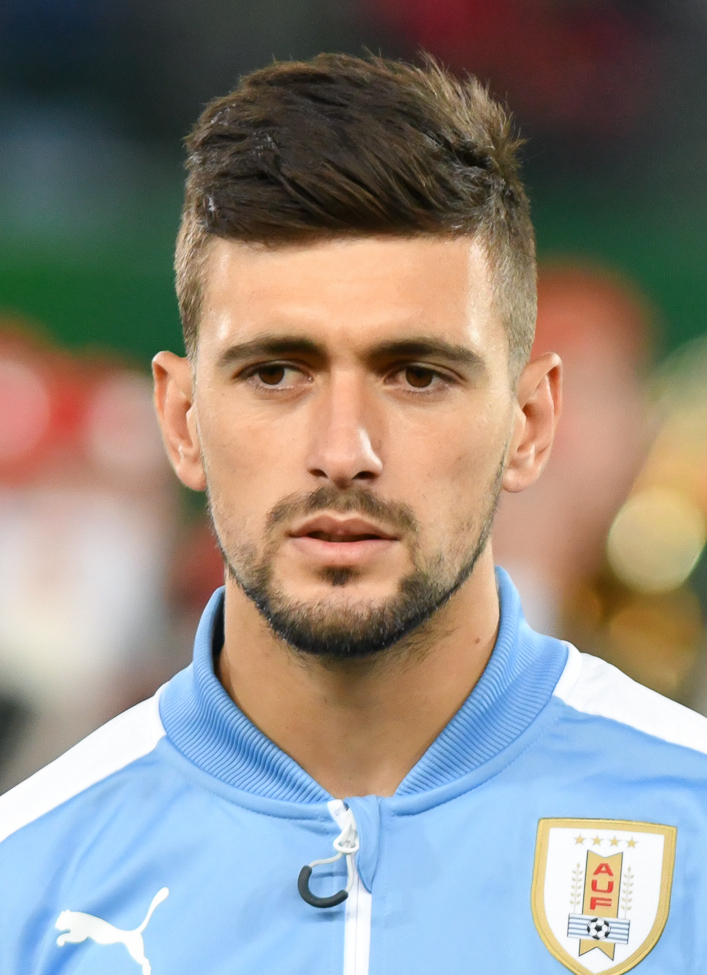
Giorgian de Arrascaeta, currently third in all time appearances.

	Nation	Players
1	(Argentina)	34
2	(Paraguay)	12
3	(Uruguay)	10
4	(Colombia)	8
5	(Chile)	6
6	(England)	4
6	(Spain)	4
6	(Ecuador)	4
9	(Peru)	3
10	(Sweden)	2
10	(Portugal)	2
10	(Poland)	2
10	(Italy)	2
14	(Serbia)	1
14	(Croatia)	1
14	(Qatar)	1
14	(Germany)	1
14	(Canada)	1
14	(Bolivia)	1
14	(Mozambique)	1
14	(Nigeria)	1
14	(Hungary)	1
14	(Slovakia)	1
14	(Algeria)	1
14	(Sierra Leone)	1
Total		104
