= 2003–04 in Argentine football =

Football in Argentina
- Season: 2003–04

The 2003–04 Argentine First Division season saw Boca Juniors ecstatic after a title run that also included the Intercontinental Cup. River Plate stole the Clausura leaving hated rival Boca Juniors looking up from second place.

Four teams were relegated, Chacarita, Nueva Chicago, Atlético de Rafaela and Talleres de Córdoba. The first two lost a direct relegation, their places occupied by Club Almagro and Instituto de Córdoba. The last two lost their "promotion" games against Huracán de Tres Arroyos and Argentinos Juniors, respectively.

== Torneo Apertura ("Opening" Tournament) ==
Position	Team	Points	Played	Won	Drawn	Lost	For	Against	Difference
1	Boca Juniors	39	19	11	6	2	31	11	+20
2	San Lorenzo	36	19	11	3	5	26	13	+13
3	Banfield	32	19	9	5	5	27	18	+9
4	Quilmes	31	19	8	7	4	20	13	+7
5	Rosario Central	31	19	8	7	4	28	26	+2
6	Newell's Old Boys	29	19	7	8	4	27	20	+7
7	Arsenal de Sarandí	26	19	6	8	5	18	16	+2
8	River Plate	26	19	7	5	7	23	24	-1
9	Colón de Santa Fe	24	19	5	9	5	23	24	-1
10	Talleres de Córdoba	24	19	6	6	7	27	30	-3
11	Estudiantes La Plata	23	19	6	5	8	18	20	-2
12	Racing Club	22	19	4	10	5	23	23	0
13	Lanús	22	19	4	10	5	21	23	-2
14	Independiente	22	19	5	7	7	15	19	-4
15	Vélez Sársfield	22	19	5	7	7	20	28	-8
16	Chacarita	21	19	5	9	5	20	19	+1
17	Gimnasia de La Plata	21	19	5	6	8	14	22	-8
18	Olimpo de Bahía Blanca	20	19	5	5	9	17	23	-6
19	Atlético de Rafaela	17	19	3	8	8	19	28	-9
20	Nueva Chicago	11	19	2	5	12	14	31	-17

=== Top Scorers ===
Position	Player	Team	Goals
1	Ernesto Farías	Estudiantes La Plata	12
2	Alberto Acosta	San Lorenzo	10
3	Julián Vásquez	Newell's Old Boys	9
4	Fernando Cavenaghi	River Plate	8
4	Jorge Cervera	Banfield	8
4	Diego Milito	Racing Club	8
4	Carlos Tevez	Boca Juniors	8

=== Relegation ===
There is no relegation after the Apertura. For the relegation results of this tournament see below

== Torneo Clausura ("Closing" Tournament) ==
Position	Team	Points	Played	Won	Drawn	Lost	For	Against	Difference
1	River Plate	40	19	12	4	3	41	21	20
2	Boca Juniors	36	19	10	6	3	34	17	17
3	Talleres de Córdoba	35	19	10	5	4	30	19	11
4	Banfield	32	19	9	5	5	27	17	10
5	Vélez Sársfield	31	19	9	4	6	31	21	10
6	Quilmes	29	19	7	8	4	21	16	5
7	Arsenal de Sarandí	29	19	7	8	4	21	22	-1
8	Lanús	20	19	5	5	9	21	27	-6
9	Olimpo de Bahía Blanca	19	19	4	7	8	18	28	-10
10	Racing Club	28	19	8	4	7	29	29	0
11	San Lorenzo	26	19	6	8	5	18	16	2
12	Atlético de Rafaela	26	19	7	5	7	25	24	1
13	Colón de Santa Fe	25	19	7	4	8	20	26	-6
14	Newell's Old Boys	22	19	4	10	5	28	25	3
15	Independiente	22	19	5	7	7	21	27	-6
16	Estudiantes La Plata	21	19	5	6	8	19	29	-10
17	Gimnasia de La Plata	17	19	3	8	8	21	26	-5
18	Nueva Chicago	17	19	2	11	6	18	27	-9
19	Chacarita	17	19	3	8	8	21	34	-13
20	Rosario Central	13	19	2	7	10	16	29	-13

=== Top Scorers ===
Position	Player	Team	Goals
1	Rolando Zárate	Vélez Sársfield	13
2	Aldo Osorio	Talleres de Córdoba	11
2	Fernando Cavenaghi	River Plate	9
3	José Luis Calderón	Arsenal de Sarandí	8
4	Eduardo Bustos Montoya	Banfield	7
4	Esteban Fuertes	Colón de Santa Fe	7
4	Darío Gandín	Atlético Rafaela	7
4	Victor Piríz Alves	Talleres de Córdoba	7
4	Mauro Rosales	Newell's Old Boys	7

=== Relegation ===
Team	Average	Points	Played	2001–02	2002–03	2003-04
River Plate	2.008	229	114	84	79	66
Boca Juniors	1.947	222	114	68	79	75
Quilmes	1.578	60	38	N/A	N/A	60
San Lorenzo	1.526	174	114	57	56	61
Racing Club	1.500	171	114	68	53	50
Vélez Sársfield	1.464	167	114	48	66	53
Colón de Santa Fe	1.421	162	114	56	57	49
Banfield	1.403	160	114	48	48	64
Arsenal de Sarandí	1.368	104	76	N/A	49	55
Newell's Old Boys	1.324	151	114	51	49	51
Gimnasia de La Plata	1.298	148	114	64	46	38
Independiente	1.280	146	114	41	61	44
Rosario Central	1.280	146	114	40	62	44
Lanús	1.263	144	114	51	51	42
Estudiantes de La Plata	1.210	138	114	51	43	44
Olimpo de Bahía Blanca	1.184	90	76	N/A	51	39
Talleres de Córdoba	1.166	133	114	30	44	59
Atlético de Rafaela	1.131	43	38	N/A	N/A	43
Chacarita	1.105	126	114	47	41	38
Nueva Chicago	1.026	117	114	48	41	28

==== "Promoción" Playoff ====
Date	Home	Away	Result
June 30, 2004	Huracán de Tres Arroyos	Atlético de Rafaela	2-1
July 4, 2004	Atlético de Rafaela	Huracán de Tres Arroyos	2-3

Huracán de Tres Arroyos wins 5-3 and is promoted to Argentine First Division. Atlético Rafaela is relegated to the Argentine Nacional B.

Date	Home	Away	Result
July 1, 2004	Argentinos Juniors	Talleres de Córdoba	2-1
July 4, 2004	Talleres de Córdoba	Argentinos Juniors	1-2

Argentinos Juniors wins 4-2 and is promoted to Argentine First Division. Talleres de Córdoba is relegated to the Argentine Nacional B.

== Argentine clubs in international competitions ==
Team	Intercontinental	Recopa	Copa Sudamericana 2003	Copa Libertadores 2004
Boca Juniors	Champions	Runner up	QF	Runner up
River Plate	N/A	N/A	Runner up	Semi final
Rosario Central	N/A	N/A	1st preliminary round	2nd round
Independiente	N/A	N/A	2nd preliminary round	Group stage
Colón de Santa Fe	N/A	N/A	2nd preliminary round	did not qualify
Vélez Sársfield	N/A	N/A	1st preliminary round	Group stage

== Lower leagues ==
Level	Tournament	Champion
2nd	Primera B Nacional Apertura; Primera B Nacional Clausura	Instituto; Almagro
3rd	Primera B Metropolitana	Club Atlético Sarmiento
3rd (Interior)	Torneo Argentino A	Racing de Córdoba
4th	Primera C Metropolitana	Argentino de Rosario
5th	Primera D Metropolitana	Sportivo Barracas

== National team ==
This section covers Argentina's games from August 1, 2003 to July 31, 2004.

Win Draw Loss

=== Friendly matches ===
August 20, 2003	Argentina	3 – 2	Uruguay	Florence, Italy
	Verón 45'; Samuel 81'; D'Alessandro 85'	(Report)	Forlán 2'; Liguera 57'	Stadium: Stadio Artemio Franchi; Attendance: 8,000

April 28, 2004	Morocco	0 – 1	Argentina	Casablanca, Morocco
22:00 UTC±0		(Report)	K. González 53'	Stadium: Stade Mohammed V Attendance: 60,000

June 27, 2004	Colombia	2 – 0	Argentina	Miami, United States
	Moreno 21'; Herrera 76'	(Report)		Stadium: Orange Bowl; Referee: Kevin Terry (United States)

June 30, 2004	Argentina	2 – 1	Peru	New Jersey, United States
	K. González 24' (pen.); Saviola 72'	(Report)	Solano 36' (pen.)	Stadium: Giants Stadium

=== 2006 World Cup qualifiers ===
September 6, 2003 Round 1	Argentina	2 – 2	Chile	Buenos Aires, Argentina
16:00 UTC-03	K. González 32'; Aimar 36'	(Report)	Mirosevic 60'; Navia 77'	Stadium: Estadio Antonio V. Liberti; Attendance: 35,372; Referee: Ubaldo Aquino (Paraguay)

September 9, 2003 Round 2	Venezuela	0 – 3	Argentina	Caracas, Venezuela
19:00 UTC-04:30		(Report)	Aimar 7'; Crespo 25'; Delgado 32'	Stadium: Estadio Olímpico; Attendance: 24,783; Referee: Martín Vázquez (Uruguay)

November 15, 2003 Round 3	Argentina	3 – 0	Bolivia	Buenos Aires, Argentina
21:30 UTC-03	D'Alessandro 56'; Crespo 61'; Aimar 63'	(Report)		Stadium: Estadio Antonio V. Liberti; Attendance: 30,042; Referee: Gilberto Hidalgo (Peru)

November 19, 2003 Round 4	Colombia	1 – 1	Argentina	Barranquilla, Colombia
21:00 UTC-05	Ángel 47'	(Report)	Crespo 27'	Stadium: Estadio Metropolitano; Attendance: 35,034; Referee: Carlos Eugênio Simon (Brazil)

March 30, 2004 Round 5	Argentina	1 – 0	Ecuador	Buenos Aires, Argentina
20:30 UTC-03	Crespo 60'	(Report)		Stadium: Estadio Antonio V. Liberti; Attendance: 55,000; Referee: Martín Vázquez (Uruguay)

June 2, 2004 Round 6	Brazil	3 – 1	Argentina	Belo Horizonte, Brazil
21:45 UTC-03	Ronaldo 16' (pen.) 67' (pen.) 90+6' (pen.)	(Report)	Sorín 79'	Stadium: Mineirão; Attendance: 60,000; Referee: Óscar Ruiz (Colombia)

June 6, 2004 Round 7	Argentina	0 – 0	Paraguay	Buenos Aires, Argentina
15:00 UTC-03		(Report)		Stadium: Estadio Antonio V. Liberti; Attendance: 37,000; Referee: Carlos Eugênio Simon (Brazil)

=== 2004 Copa América ===
July 7, 2004 Group stage	Argentina	6 – 1	Ecuador	Chiclayo, Peru
19:45 UTC-05	K. González 6' (pen.); Saviola 64', 75', 78'; D'Alessandro 84'; L. González 90'	(Report)	Delgado 62'	Stadium: Estadio Elías Aguirre; Attendance: 24,000; Referee: Carlos Amarilla (Paraguay)

July 10, 2004 Group stage	Argentina	0 – 1	Mexico	Chiclayo, Peru
19:45 UTC-05		(Report)	Morales 9'	Stadium: Estadio Elías Aguirre; Attendance: 25,000; Referee: Márcio Rezende (Brazil)

July 13, 2004 Group stage	Argentina	4 – 2	Uruguay	Piura, Peru
19:45 UTC-05	K. González 19'; Figueroa 20', 90'; Ayala 81'	(Report)	Estoyanoff 8'; Sánchez 39'	Stadium: Estadio Miguel Grau; Attendance: 24,000; Referee: Rubén Selman (Chile)

July 17, 2004 Quarter-finals	Peru	0 – 1	Argentina	Chiclayo, Peru
17:00 UTC-05		(Report)	Tevez 61'	Stadium: Estadio Elías Aguirre; Attendance: 25,000; Referee: Carlos Amarilla (Paraguay)

July 20, 2004 Semi-finals	Argentina	3 – 0	Colombia	Lima, Peru
19:45 UTC-05	Tevez 33'; L. González 50'; Sorín 80'	(Report)		Stadium: Estadio Nacional; Attendance: 22,000; Referee: Gilberto Hidalgo (Peru)

July 25, 2004 Final	Argentina	2 – 2 (2 – 4 p)	Brazil	Lima, Peru
15:00 UTC-05	K. González 21' (pen.); Delgado 87'	(Report)	Luisão 45'; Adriano 90+3'	Stadium: Estadio Nacional; Attendance: 43,000; Referee: Carlos Amarilla (Paraguay)
	Penalties
	D'Alessandro (penalty missed); Heinze (penalty missed); K. González (penalty scored); Sorín (penalty scored)		(penalty scored) Adriano; (penalty scored) Edu; (penalty scored) Diego; (penalty scored) Juan
