= Carlos Fanta =

Chilean footballer and manager (1890–1964)

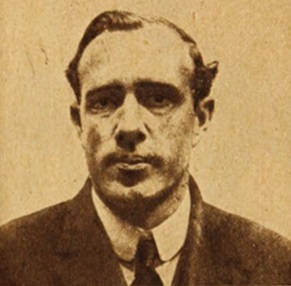
- Carlos Fanta in 1923.

Personal information
- Full name: Luis Carlos Fanta Tomaszewski
- Date of birth: 21 August 1890
- Place of birth: Chillán, Chile
- Date of death: 8 December 1964 (aged 74)
- Place of death: Santiago, Chile
- Position: Goalkeeper

Youth career
- 1905: Industrial F.C.
- 1905–1907: Internado Nacional

Senior career*
Years	Team	Apps	(Gls)
1905	Santiago National		
1906–1907	Magallanes		
1908–1911	Santiago National		
1912–1919	Internado		

International career
1913	Chile		

Managerial career
- 1916: Chile
- * Club domestic league appearances and goals

Luis Carlos Fanta Tomaszewski (21 August 1890 – 8 December 1964), known as Carlos Fanta, was a Chilean football player, manager, referee, director of football, journalist, and pharmacist.

== Early years ==
Fanta belonged to a German-Polish family. Both his father, Carlos Sr., and his mother, Alma, were distinguished professors who came to Chile in 1888 recruited by the President of Chile José Manuel Balmaceda along with their four children: Margarita, Olga, Federico and Kurt. In Santiago, they worked in the educational system reform of the Escuelas Normales (Normal school), moving after to Chillán where Carlos and his younger brother, Alfredo, were born. Carlos attended primary school at the Liceo de Chillán until 1905.

== Studying career ==
In 1905, Fanta moved to Santiago and attended the Internado Nacional until 1907, getting a degree in Bachiller de Humanidades. In 1909 he graduated as PE teacher at the Instituto de Educación Física (Physical Education Institute). Then, he attended University of Chile and graduated as a Pharmacist in 1917.

== Football career ==
=== Player ===
Fanta was a goalkeeper. While studying in secondary school, he was with Industrial F.C. of Chillán (1905) and Internado Nacional Football Club of Santiago (1905–1907), becoming the team captain. Internado Nacional Football Club was founded in 1902 by the same Carlos alongside the teachers Leonardo Matus and Jorge Breñas. Along with Internado Nacional, he won the Copa Municipal 1907 of the Asociación Arturo Prat. At the same time, he played for both Santiago National (1905) and Magallanes (1906–1907) and did track and field, also winning several medals.

After ending secondary school, he returned to Santiago National for 4 seasons (1908–1911). As a student of University of Chile, he played in the first Clásico Universitario – and the following matches – against the team of the Catholic University of Chile on 1 November 1909.

Alongside former students of Internado Nacional and students of the University of Chile, he participated in the foundation of the Club Atlético Internado – later Club Universidad de Chile – on 25 March 1911, becoming the President. After the club joined Asociación de Football de Santiago in 1912, he joined the first team until 1915. From 1916 to 1919, he played for the second team until his retirement.

At international level, Fanta took part of intercity matches representing Santiago versus Valparaíso, by which players were selected for the Chile national team. Fanta was called up to the Chile preliminary squad that would face Argentina in May 1910 in the context of the May Revolution centenary, but finally he didn't take part of the final squad.

In 1913, he participated as both the delegation secretary and referee in a tour of the Chile national team in Brazil, but also played in a match against Liga Campista. The result was a 7–0 win.

=== Referee ===
Parallel to the fact that he was a sportsman, he performed as a referee. From 1905 to 1910, he refereed matches of Asociación Arturo Prat, then was an official referee of Asociación de Football de Santiago. In the 1913 tour in Brazil, he went with the Chile national team as a referee, taking part in three matches: against Brazil and America FC in Rio de Janeiro and against Liga Paulista in São Paulo.

About the South American Championships, he took part in four editions: 1916, 1917, 1920 and 1924. In both 1916 and 1924 editions, he refereed the final match between Argentina and Uruguay. As a curiosity, the 1916 final match on 16 July was suspended at the beginning due to the fact the "Estadio G.E.B.A." was burned by people unable to gain entry due to undercapacity. So the match was restarted the next day in the Stadium of Racing Club.

At national level, in 1933 he refereed the first final of the Chilean professional football between Magallanes and Colo-Colo. As an important achievement, he unified the Referees Association of Chile.

=== Manager ===
Unofficially coaching teams from 1911, in the 1916 South American Championship – where he performed as a referee – he became the first Chile national team manager. He coached the matches against Uruguay (loss, 4–0), Argentina (loss, 6–1) and Brazil (draw, 1–1). Also, he coached Chile in the friendly matches against Argentina (loss, 1–0) and Uruguay (loss, 4–1) in July 1916.

=== Leader ===
Fanta was a prolific sports leader who held several managerial charges in both football and other sports:

- Asociación Arturo Prat: Secretary (1906–1912)
- Internado Nacional Football Club: Founder (1902) and President (1910)
- Club Atlético Internado: Founder (1911) and President (1911–1919)
- Asociación de Football de Santiago: Secretary (1911–1913)
- Liga Nacional Obrera de Football: President (1913–1925)
- Federación Sportiva Nacional: President
- Chile national team Delegation: Secretary (1913)
- Referees Association of Chile: Founder (1926) and President
- Chilean Olympic Committee: Secretary
- Delegate of Chile in more than 40 international sports conferences (football, track and field, boxing, fencing, basketball and boat racing)
- CONSUDATLE: Founder and President (1918)
- Colo-Colo: Honorary Director of the foundation meeting (1925)
- Confederación Sudamericana de Football: Promoter

== Journalism ==
Despite not having formally studied journalism, he began his career in the newspaper La Mañana (The Morning) in 1914, becoming the director of the sports section until 1916. Also worked as a reporter for both sports magazines Match and Los Sports. The next year he joined La Nación until his retirement from the activity, creating the sports section. As a correspondent, he went to several international competitions, like 1928 Summer Olympics, where he was with Manuel Plaza who won the first Olympic medal for Chile.

== Personal life ==
While he was a college student, he performed as a deputy inspector – and later as a PE teacher – at the Internado Nacional. Outside of sports, he worked as a public official in the Ministry of Health (Drugstores Inspector), the Ministry of Defense and the Ministry of Finance (Administrator and Director of Control and Statistics of the Port Exploitation). In addition to this, he was the owner of the Botica Fanta (Fanta Drugstore) in Santiago, what was managed by his wife, Rosa Núñez, with whom had five children: María, Mario, Carlos, Enrique and Alma.

He died of a heart attack on 8 December 1964 and was laid to rest in the Santiago General Cemetery.

== Honours ==
=== Player ===
Internado Nacional

- Copa Municipal – Asociación Arturo Prat: 1907

=== Individual ===
- South American Championship Best Referee: 1917
- Medalla al Mérito del Deporte Chileno: 1946
