= Cristian Fernández =

Cristian Fernández may refer to:

- Cristian Fernández (Argentine footballer) (born 1979)
- Cristian Fernández (Spanish footballer) (born 1988)
