= Allemandi =

Allemandi is a surname. Notable people with the surname include:

- Luigi Allemandi (1903–1978), Italian footballer
- Roberto Allemandi (1912–?), Argentine footballer
- Umberto Allemandi (1938–2026), Italian publisher
