= José Luis Boffi =

Argentine footballer (1897–1981)

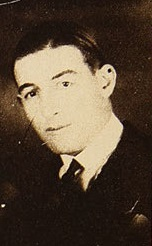
- Boffi in 1925

Personal information
- Full name: José Luis Boffi
- Date of birth: 9 April 1897
- Place of birth: Buenos Aires, Argentina
- Date of death: 26 December 1967 (aged 70)
- Place of death: Chile
- Position: Midfielder

Senior career*
Years	Team	Apps	(Gls)
1917–1925	Vélez Sarsfield		
1925–1931	Everton		

International career
1921	Argentina	1	(0)

Managerial career
- 1928–1931: Everton (assistant)
- 1932–1940: Vélez Sarsfield
- 1942–1943: Santiago Morning
- 1944–1945: Audax Italiano
- 1945: Bernardo O'Higgins
- 1946–1947: Magallanes
- 1949: Chile
- 1952: Colo-Colo
- 1954–1956: Huachipato
- 1956–1957: Rangers
- 1958–1960: Lister Rossel
- 1961: Huachipato
- 1961: Santiago Morning
- 1962–1963: Lister Rossel
- 1966: Santiago Morning
- * Club domestic league appearances and goals

José Luis Boffi (9 April 1897 – 26 December 1981) was an Argentine football player and manager.

== Playing career ==
In his homeland, Boffi stood out as a player of Vélez Sarsfield.

In June 1925, Boffi came to Chile as team captain of a squad from the Asociación Amateur de Football (Amateur Football Association), an Argentine league based in Buenos Aires founded in 1919, in the context of a tour. Everton de Viña del Mar offered him a contract and Boffi offered them a team shirt set from Argentina. After returning for a short time to his homeland, he returned to Chile in September of the same year to sign with Everton, bringing with him shirts of Boca Juniors whose model the club adopted.

== Coaching career ==
At the same time he was a player of Everton, he served as assistant coach.

As a head coach, he began his career with Vélez Sarsfield in his homeland.

Boffi developed the most part of his career in Chile. In the Chilean Primera División, he led clubs such as Audax Italiano (1944–1945), Colo-Colo (1952), Rangers de Talca (1956–1957) and Santiago Morning (1942–1943, 1951, 1966).

At lower divisions, he led clubs such as Bernardo O'Higgins (March 1945), Huachipato (1954–1956, 1961) and Lister Rossel (1958–1960, 1962–1963).

In June 1949, he also assumed as coach of the Chile national team. Subsequently, he and Waldo Sanhueza made up a technical pair and led the team in an unofficial friendly against the Mendoza team in Santiago on 12 October of the same year, winning by 3–2.
