= Guillermo Saavedra (footballer) =

Chilean footballer (1903–1957)

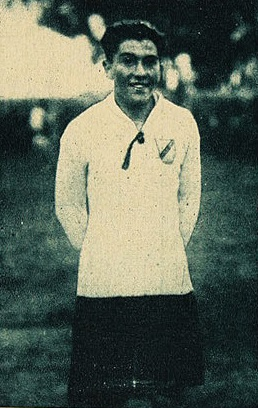

Personal information
- Full name: Guillermo Zacarias Saavedra Tapia
- Date of birth: 5 November 1903
- Place of birth: Rancagua, Chile
- Date of death: 12 May 1957 (aged 53)
- Position: Midfielder

Senior career*
Years	Team	Apps	(Gls)
1926–1933	Colo-Colo		

International career
1928–1930	Chile	9	(1)

Managerial career
- 1928–1929: Colo-Colo
- 1931–1932: Colo-Colo
- 1936: Colo-Colo (interim)
- 1940: Colo-Colo
- 1954: Unión La Calera
- * Club domestic league appearances and goals

Guillermo Zacarias Saavedra Tapia (5 November 1903 – 12 May 1957) was a Chilean footballer who played as a midfielder for his native country in the 1930 FIFA World Cup. He was also part of Chile's team at the 1928 Summer Olympics.

== Honours ==
=== Club ===
Colo-Colo

- Campeonato de Apertura: 1933
