= Kurt Axelsson =

Swedish footballer (1941–1984)

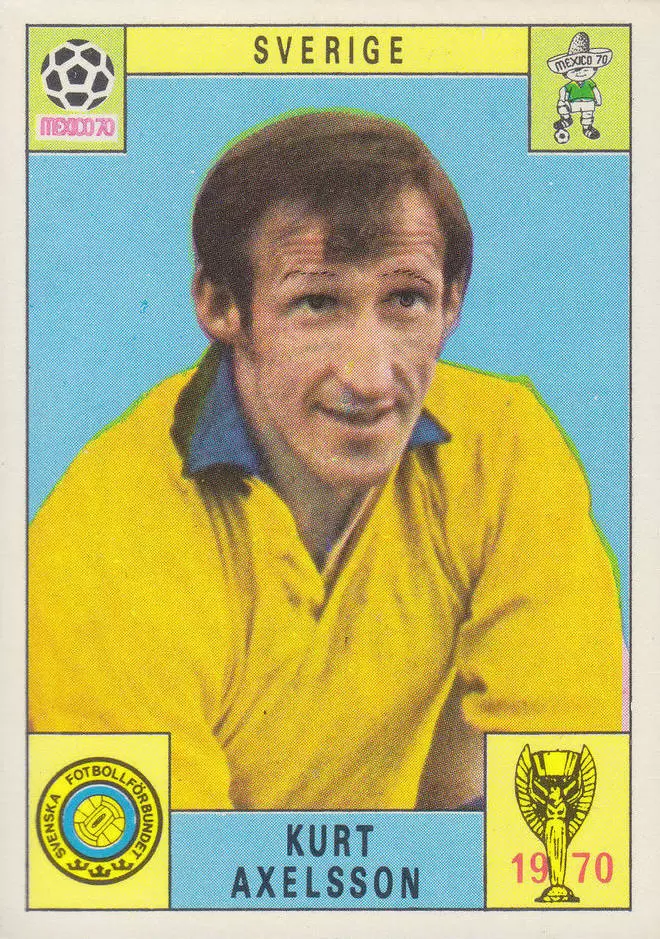
- Axelsson in 1970

Personal information
- Full name: Kurt Axelsson
- Date of birth: 10 November 1941
- Place of birth: Rännberg, Sweden
- Date of death: 15 December 1984 (aged 43)
- Place of death: Belgium
- Height: 1.78 m (5 ft 10 in)
- Position: Defender

Youth career
- Rännbergs IK

Senior career*
Years	Team	Apps	(Gls)
1964–1967	GAIS	71	(0)
1967–1973	Club Brugge	119	(4)
1973–1976	A.S.V. Oostende K.M.	71	(0)
Total		261	(4)

International career
1966–1971	Sweden	30	(0)
- * Club domestic league appearances and goals

Kurt Axelsson (10 November 1941 – 15 December 1984) was a Swedish professional footballer who played as a defender. He represented GAIS, Club Brugge, and A.S.V. Oostende K.M. during a career that spanned between 1964 and 1976. A full international between 1966 and 1971, he won 30 caps for the Sweden national team and was on the squad at the 1970 FIFA World Cup.

== Club career ==
Axelsson played for Rännbergs IK, IFK Sunne and IK Sleipner before making his top flight debut in the Allsvenskan in 1964, with GAIS. He was a valuable defender for the Gothenburg club and played 71 games for them. In 1967, he turned professional with Club Brugge KV in Belgium, where in 6 seasons, he played 153 games and scored 4 goals for the club. He then played for A.S.V. Oostende K.M. (1973–76) and was a player-coach for K.V. Kortrijk.

== International career ==
Axelsson was capped 30 times between 1966 and 1971 for the Sweden national team and was on the team in the 1970 FIFA World Cup.

== Personal life ==
Kurt Axelsson died in a car accident in 1984, aged 43

== Honours ==
Club Brugge

- Belgian First Division: 1972–73
- Belgian Cup: 1967–68, 1969–70

Individual

- Stor Grabb: 1967
- Swedish Football Hall of Fame: 2015
