= Ruben Grighini =

Argentine footballer

Personal information
- Full name: Ruben Gerardo Grighini
- Date of birth: January 11, 1987 (age 39)
- Place of birth: Buenos Aires, Argentina
- Height: 1.83 m (6 ft 0 in)
- Position: Defender

Team information
- Current team: Rovigo Calcio

Senior career*
Years	Team	Apps	(Gls)
2004–2005	FBC Unione Venezia	1	
2005–2006	Vicenza Calcio	2	
2006–2007	AS Cittadella	1	
2007–2008	FBC Unione Venezia	12	
2008–2009	Rovigo Calcio	7	(?)
- * Club domestic league appearances and goals as of 18:44, 19 April 2009 (UTC)

Ruben Gerardo Grighini (born 11 January 1987) is an Argentinian footballer who last played for Rovigo Calcio. He made his Serie B debut with FBC Unione Venezia in the 2004–2005 season.
