= Internado Nacional Barros Arana =

Coordinates: 33°26′15″S 70°40′54″W

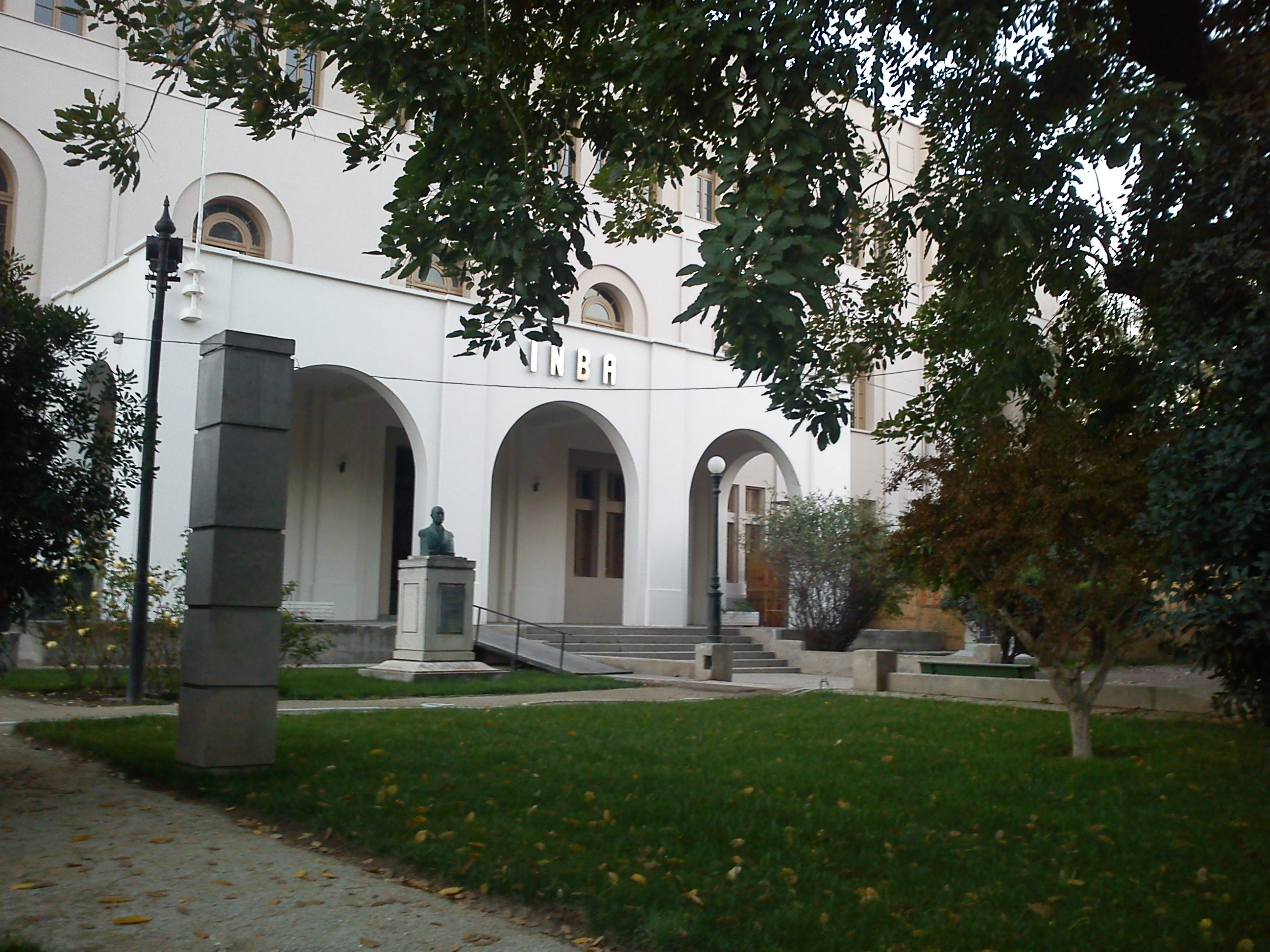
Internado Nacional Barros Arana

The Internado Nacional Barros Arana (INBA), also known by its code A-17, is a high school located in Santiago, Chile, particularly in front of Quinta Normal Park. It began its operations independently on 20 May 1902, under the presidency of Germán Riesco. The idea of its creation was of former president José Manuel Balmaceda in 1887, who appealed to the "social necessity, derived of Chilean customs, and the dispersion of two thirds of the population in hills and valleys of the territory".
