= Electo Pereda =

Chilean football manager and military personnel

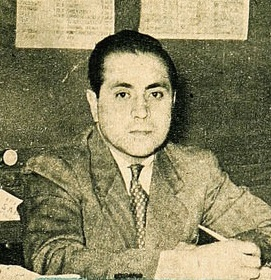

Personal information
- Full name: Electo Pereda
- Place of birth: , Chile

Managerial career
- Years: Team
- 1935: Colo-Colo

Electo Pereda was a Chilean manager. He coached as a hobby Colo-Colo during 1930s, being militar his original occupation.
