= Osvaldo Peretti =

Argentine footballer

- Peretti Osvaldo in 1950

Personal information
- Date of birth: 30 April 1921
- Place of birth: Buenos Aires, Argentina
- Position: Midfielder

Senior career*
Years	Team	Apps	(Gls)
1947–1949	Roma	7	(1)
1949–1952	Piacenza	52	(5)
- * Club domestic league appearances and goals

Osvaldo Peretti (born 30 April 1921) is an Argentine retired professional footballer. He played seven games and scored one goal in the 1947/48 Serie A season for A.S. Roma.
