= Franco Da Dalt =

Argentine footballer

Personal information
- Date of birth: 10 September 1987 (age 39)
- Place of birth: Ituzaingó, Corrientes, Argentina
- Height: 1.78 m (5 ft 10 in)
- Position: Midfielder

Team information
- Current team: ASD Sant’Onofrio
- Number: 33

Youth career
- Montebelluna
- 2003–2004: → Sampdoria (loan)
- 2004–2005: → Venezia (loan)
- 2005–2006: Triestina

Senior career*
Years	Team	Apps	(Gls)
2005–2008	Triestina	15	(0)
2006–2007	→ Foggia (loan)	2	(0)
2007	→ Varese (loan)	8	(0)
2008–2009	Hellas Verona	9	(1)
2009–2010	Foligno	14	(0)
2010–2011	Como	21	(0)
2011–2012	Este	15	(0)
2012–2016	Vibonese	92	(8)
2016–2017	Frattese	31	(3)
2017–2018	Vibonese	25	(0)
2018	Campobasso	15	(0)
2018–2019	Avellino	23	(2)
2019–2021	Turris	60	(1)
2021–	Lamezia Terme	11	(0)
- * Club domestic league appearances and goals as of 25 January 2026

Franco Da Dalt (born 10 September 1987) is an Argentine footballer who plays in Italy for ASD Sant’Onofrio.

== Biography ==
On 29 August 2003, he was loaned to Sampdoria along with Nicola Cremasco. In summer 2005, he was signed by Triestina.

In July 2008 he was signed by Verona in July 2008.

In August 2010, he signed a 1-year contract with Como, rejoining former teammate Christian Conti.

On 2 August 2018, he joined Serie D club Campobasso.

On 11 August 2021, he returned to Serie D after one season in Serie C with Turris and signed with Lamezia Terme.

At the end of December 2025, Da Dalt signed for ASD Sant’Onofrio.
