= Juán Landolfi =

Argentine-Italian footballer

Personal information
- Date of birth: 23 June 1914
- Place of birth: Córdoba, Argentina
- Position: Defender

Senior career*
Years	Team	Apps	(Gls)
1939–1940	Newell's Old Boys		
1940–1941	Lucchese	29	(0)
1941–1942	Ambrosiana-Inter	19	(0)
1942–1943	Padova	12	(0)
1945–1946	Carrarese		
1946–1947	Viareggio	31	(0)
1947–1951	Avellino		
- * Club domestic league appearances and goals

Juán Agripino Landolfi (born 23 June 1914, date of death unknown) was an Argentine professional football player. He also held Italian citizenship. Landolfi is deceased.
