= Pedro Mazullo =

Uruguayan football manager

Personal information
- Full name: Pedro Marcelo Mazullo Pizano
- Date of birth: 15 February 1892
- Place of birth: Rocha, Uruguay
- Position: Right winger

Youth career
- 1910: Nacional

Senior career*
Years	Team	Apps	(Gls)
1910–1912	Nacional	16	(1)
1912	CURCC		
1913–1915	Defensor		
1916–1917	Central FC		
1918–1919	Sport Recife		
1920	America-RJ		
1921–1923	Americano		

Managerial career
- Americano
- Goytacaz
- 1933–1934: Corinthians
- 1934: Santos
- 1935–1936: Santiago Wanderers
- 1936: Colo-Colo
- 1936–1939: Chile
- 1940: Deportivo Municipal
- 1941: Selección Porteña
- Universidad Santa María
- Cemento Melón
- * Club domestic league appearances and goals

Pedro Marcelo Mazullo Pizano (15 February 1892 – unknown) was a Uruguayan football player and manager.

== Career ==
Born in Rocha, Uruguay, Mazullo began his career with Nacional, making 33 appearances in total with 5 goals. In his homeland, he also played for Central Uruguay Railway Cricket Club (CURCC), Defensor and Central FC.

Abroad, Mazullo played in Brazil for Sport Recife, America-RJ and Americano.

As a football coach, Mazullo worked in Brazil and Chile. He stood out as coach of the Chile national football team between 1936 and 1939, leading them in 1937 to their inaugural sport victory over Uruguay, Mazullo's native country, in a 3–0 win at the San Lorenzo de Almagro ground in Buenos Aires.
