= Juan Carlos Docabo =

Argentine footballer

Personal information
- Date of birth: 14 December 1970 (age 55)
- Place of birth: Buenos Aires, Argentina
- Height: 1.83 m (6 ft 0 in)
- Position: Goalkeeper

Youth career
- Chacarita Juniors
- San Lorenzo

Senior career*
Years	Team	Apps	(Gls)
1989–1990	San Lorenzo	40	(0)
1991	Junior		
1991–1995	Vélez Sársfield	37	(0)
1995–1996	Deportes Temuco	54	(0)
1997–1999	Perugia	4	(0)
1999–2000	Viterbese	3	(0)
2000–2002	Chacarita Juniors	12	(0)
2002–2005	Estudiantes	53	(0)
2005–2006	Banfield	0	(0)
- * Club domestic league appearances and goals

Juan Carlos Docabo (born 14 December 1970) is a former Argentine footballer who played as a goalkeeper.

== Career ==
Docabo played for San Lorenzo, Junior, Vélez Sársfield, Deportes Temuco, Perugia, Viterbese, Chacarita Juniors, Estudiantes and Banfield. He retired in 2006.

As a goalkeeping coach, he has worked for River Plate and San Lorenzo de Almagro.

=== Curiosities ===
As a youth player of Chacarita Juniors, Docabo coincided with the President of Argentina, Javier Milei.
