= Cristian Fernández (Argentine footballer) =

Argentine footballer (born 1979)

Personal information
- Full name: Cristian Gabriel Fernández Parentini
- Date of birth: July 15, 1979 (age 47)
- Place of birth: Buenos Aires, Argentina
- Height: 1.82 m (5 ft 11 1/2 in)
- Position: Left wing back

Senior career*
Years	Team	Apps	(Gls)
1998–2003	Huracán	38	(0)
2003–2004	Venezia	21	(0)
2004–2005	Racing Club	6	(0)
2005–2006	Audax Italiano	10	(0)
2006–2007	Lleida	29	(0)
2008	Spezia	9	(0)
2009	Aurora		
- * Club domestic league appearances and goals as of 2 Nov 2009

Cristian Fernández Parentini (born 15 July 1979 in Buenos Aires, Argentina) is an Argentine footballer.

== Honours ==
Huracán

- Primera B Nacional Argentina: 1 (2000)
