= Franco Ponzinibio =

Argentine footballer (1914–2004)

Personal information
- Date of birth: 16 July 1914
- Place of birth: Buenos Aires, Argentina
- Date of death: 19 February 2004 (aged 89)
- Position: Midfielder

Senior career*
Years	Team	Apps	(Gls)
1932	Estudiantes de La Plata		
1932–1934	Ambrosiana-Inter		
1934–1935	Catanzarese		
1935–1937	Genova 1893	4	(0)
1937–1940	Pisa		
1940–1943	Perugia		
1943–1944	Conversano		
1944–1945	Taranto		
1946–1947	Pavia		
- * Club domestic league appearances and goals

Franco Ponzinibio (born 16 July 1914 – 19 February 2004) was an Argentine professional footballer who played as a midfielder. He also held Italian citizenship.

His older brother José Carlos Ponzinibio played for A.C. Milan in the 1930s. To distinguish them, José Carlos was referred to as Ponzinibio I and Franco as Ponzinibio II.
