= Carlos Bello =

Chilean writer and politician (1815–1854)

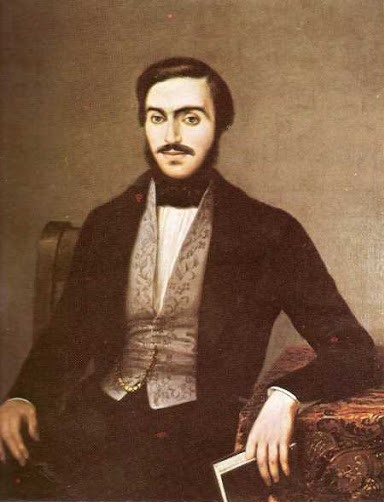

Substitute Deputy of the Republic of Chile (Representing La Serena)
- In office June 8, 1849 – June 1, 1852

Chargé d'affaires of Chile in Peru

Chargé d'affaires of Chile in Ecuador

Personal details
- Born: Carlos Eusebio Florencio Bello Boyland; 30 May 1815 London, United Kingdom of Great Britain and Ireland
- Died: 26 October 1854 (aged 39) Santiago, Chile
- Resting place: Santiago General Cemetery, Recoleta, Santiago, Chile
- Citizenship: Chilean (1850–)
- Spouse: María Elvira Cortés
- Children: 1
- Parents: Andrés Bello; Mary Ann Boyland
- Occupation: Writer; politician

Carlos Eusebio Florencio Bello Boyland (1815–1854) was a Chilean writer and politician.

== Biography ==
Bello, the first child of the marriage between Andrés Bello and Mary Ann Boyland, was born in London during his father's stay between 1810 and 1829. Together with the Bello-Dunn family, he arrived at the age of 14 in Chile, where he developed most of his work. He began writing poetry, following the influence of Lord Byron on the literature of the time, as well as some dramas.

In 1838 he traveled to Copiapó attracted by the recent discovery of Chañarcillo silver ore. In 1842 he returned to Santiago to premiere the play Los amores del poeta (1844), which was very well received by the public. In 1843 he published the serial titled El loco in the newspaper El Progreso. In 1846 he traveled to Europe via Venezuela, staying until 1850, when he returned to Chile sick with tuberculosis. In 1850 he published Trinidad, o la mujer del pescador.

For the period 1849–1852, he was elected substitute deputy for the city of La Serena; However, on June 8, 1849, the Chamber decided that he could not be a deputy because he was born abroad and did not have Chilean nationality. Later, the Chamber rectified this agreement, thus being able to join. On August 17, 1850, together with other deputies, he formulated a draft agreement so that they were declared in possession of the rights of citizens and capable of being a deputy; The agreement was approved on December 17, 1850. He also served as chargé d'affaires of Chile in Ecuador.

Carlos Bello died on October 26, 1854, at the age of thirty-nine. He was married to María Elvira Cortés with whom he had a daughter.
