= Adrián Ricchiuti =

Argentine-Italian footballer (born 1978)

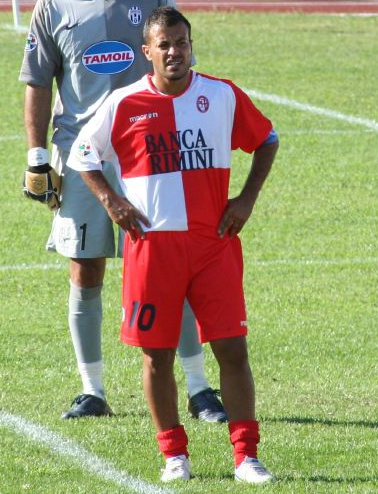

Personal information
- Date of birth: 30 June 1978 (age 48)
- Place of birth: Lanús, Argentina
- Height: 1.68 m (5 ft 6 in)
- Position: Attacking midfielder

Senior career*
Years	Team	Apps	(Gls)
1994–1996	Ternana	24	(1)
1996–1998	Genoa	10	(0)
1998	Carpi	18	(1)
1998–2000	Pistoiese	42	(3)
2000	Livorno	12	(0)
2000–2002	Arezzo	47	(10)
2002–2009	Rimini	278	(55)
2009–2013	Catania	86	(4)
2013–2014	Virtus Entella	10	(2)
2014–2016	Rimini	39	(4)
2016	Delta Rovigo	5	(0)
2016–2017	Rimini	27	(8)
2017–2019	La Fiorita	33	(14)
2019–2020	Virtus	3	(0)

Managerial career
- 2020–2021: Rimini (youth)
- 2021: Rimini
- * Club domestic league appearances and goals

Adrián Ricchiuti (born 30 June 1978) is an Argentine-Italian football coach and a former midfielder.

== Club career ==
=== Ternana Calcio ===
Ricchiuti was born in Argentina but moved to Italy in his teens to join Ternana Calcio, in 1994, and the team was then playing in Serie D. His professional career started with the club, where he made 24 first team appearances and scored 1 goal over the course of two full seasons.

=== Genoa C.F.C. ===
Following two seasons with Ternana Calcio, Ricchiuti transferred to Genoa CFC in the summer of 1996. He would again spend two seasons, before transferring again. In his two-year spell with the Ligurian club, Ricchiuti mad just 10 league appearances and hence, was sold to then-Serie C side Carpi F.C. 1909, in 1998.

=== Carpi F.C. 1909 ===
After two unsuccessful seasons at Genoa, Ricchiuti joined Carpi F.C. 1909 in 1998, and went on to make 18 appearances as a regular starter for the club, in just 6 months. The player also notched a goal. Following this short lived success with Carpi, the young Argentine was linked to a host of Argentine clubs, amongst several Serie B teams.

=== A.C. Pistoiese ===
Ricchiuti officially transferred to A.C. Pistoiese in 1998, and soon became a key part of the club's starting formation. In just 1 1/2 seasons, the young midfielder managed an impressive 42 league starts and also 3 goals. His impressive displays lead to his eventual transfer to Serie B side A.S. Livorno Calcio.

=== A.S. Livorno Calcio ===
A new Serie B adventure came about in 2000, after Ricchiuti transferred to A.S. Livorno Calcio. His adventure with the club was a short one, however, as he transferred to A.C. Arezzo, after making just 12 league appearances for the Amaranto.

=== A.C. Arezzo ===
Ricchiuti again transferred clubs in 2000, and went on to make 27 appearances, scoring 7 goals in his first season, and soon became a fan favorite within the squad. In his second season with the Tuscan club, Ricchiuti made an additional 21 appearances, scoring 3 goals. He was set for another transfer, however, in the winter of 2002, and he did indeed transfer to Serie C2 club, Rimini Calcio F.C., where his career really took off.

=== Rimini Calcio ===
In January 2002, the young attacker, transferred to Rimini Calcio F.C., who were then playing their football in the Serie C2. In his first half-season, Ricchiuti made 11 starts, and remained at the club, where he again thrived during the 2002–03 season, in which he made 32 league starts, scoring 4 goals, helping his team earn promotion to the Serie C1. The following season, the player made a hefty impact in the clubs return to the Italian third division, where he made 34 league appearances and also scored an additional 4 goals. During the 2004–05 season, he was undesputadly a starter yet again, and went on to score a career best 12 goals in 33 league matches. His impressive performances helped guide his team to another promotion, this time into the Serie B. In his first full Serie B season, Ricchiuti tallied 40 first team league matches, and scored 11 goals. On the opening day of the Serie B 2006–07 season, Ricchiuti scored the equalizer in a league match against Juventus, which is notable for being the first goal conceded by Juve during their one-year stay in the second tier of Italian football following the Calciopoli scandal. He went on to score 7 more goals that season for his club in just over 40 appearances and was now the team captain. He has played for the biancorossi since January 2002. During the 2007–08 season, the Argentine made 40 more appearances in the biancorossi uniform and tallied an additional 11 goals. In late 2009, Rimini fell to relegation despite Ricchiuti's 5 goals in 40 appearances, and hence the player was set to be transferred. In July 2009, Rimini agreed with Frosinone to sell the player, subject to personal terms. But in August 2009, he was transferred to Calcio Catania.

=== Calcio Catania ===
On 6 August 2009 Ricchiuti transferred to Serie A side Calcio Catania, as the Sicilian giants aim to bolster their squad in order to compete for UEFA Europa League places for next season. He was used mostly as a so-called "super sub", in the first portion of the new season under Gianluca Atzori, but following the appointment of Siniša Mihajlović on 8 December 2009, the player broke into the starting line-up often, and managed 3 league goals and 27 league starts in his debut Serie A season. He has since made 86 league appearances for the Sicilians, and his efforts have helped the team to four consecutive (five total) record points totals in the Italian top flight.

== Coaching career ==
On 29 January 2021, he was hired as head coach by Rimini in Serie D.
