= Francisco Garraffa =

Argentine footballer

Francisco Garaffa
Personal information
- Date of birth: May 17, 1910
- Place of birth: Avellaneda, Argentina
- Height: 1.68 m (5 ft 6 in)
- Position: Left midfielder

Senior career*
Years	Team	Apps	(Gls)
1930–1934	Racing Avellaneda	50	(?)
1934–1938	Livorno	86	(3)
1938–1939	Red Star		
1940–1941	Cosenza	26	(4)
1941–1942	Red Star		
1942–1943	Lecce	16	(2)

International career
1933	Argentina	2	(0)
- * Club domestic league appearances and goals

Francisco Garaffa or Garraffa (born May 17, 1910, date of death unknown) was an Argentine international football player. He was born in Avellaneda.

In Argentina, he played with Racing Club de Avellaneda until 1934, when he decided to move abroad to Italy where he signed with the Serie A club A.S. Livorno Calcio where he would play until 1938. Before retiring he also played back with then Serie C clubs U.S. Lecce and Cosenza Calcio 1914.

He also played twice for the Argentina national football team.

Note: Numerous sources claim he played in Red Star Belgrade, however that club was only founded in 1945. So Garraffa either played in some other club named Red Star, or then he played in some other club in Belgrade, Yugoslavia.
