= Francisco Provvidente =

Argentine footballer

Personal information
- Full name: Francisco Eugenio Provvidente
- Date of birth: February 1, 1914
- Place of birth: Buenos Aires, Argentina
- Height: 1.80 m (5 ft 11 in)
- Position: Striker

Senior career*
Years	Team	Apps	(Gls)
1934–1937	Boca Juniors	20	(24)
1938	Flamengo		
1939–1941	Roma	21	(5)
1941–1943	Vélez Sársfield		
- * Club domestic league appearances and goals

Francisco Eugenio Provvidente (first name also spelled Francesco) (born 1 February 1914, in Buenos Aires) was an Argentine professional football player. He also held Italian citizenship.

He played for 2 seasons in the Serie A for A.S. Roma, played 21 games and scored 5 goals.
