= Juan Rizzo =

Argentine footballer

Personal information
- Full name: Juan Salvador Rizzo
- Date of birth: 6 July 1906
- Place of birth: Buenos Aires, Argentina
- Position: Midfielder

Senior career*
Years	Team	Apps	(Gls)
1930–1935	Racing Club		
1935–1936	Ambrosiana-Inter	1	(0)
1936–1937	Pisa	22	(8)
1937–1938	Catania	27	(?)
1938–1940	Lugano		
- * Club domestic league appearances and goals

Juan Salvador Rizzo (born July 6, 1906, in Buenos Aires; date of death unknown) was an Argentine professional football player. He also held Uruguayan citizenship.
