= Juan Antonio =

Argentine football forward

Personal information
- Full name: Juan Ignacio Antonio
- Date of birth: 5 January 1988 (age 38)
- Place of birth: Trelew, Argentina
- Height: 1.86 m (6 ft 1 in)
- Positions: Second striker; attacking midfielder

Youth career
- 2005: C.A.I
- 2006: River Plate

Senior career*
Years	Team	Apps	(Gls)
2006–2010	River Plate	7	(0)
2010–2011	Brescia	19	(3)
2010–2011	→ Ascoli (loan)	6	(1)
2012–2014	Sampdoria	24	(2)
2013	→ Varese (loan)	9	(0)
2013–2014	→ Brescia (loan)	13	(1)
2014–2015	Parma	0	(0)
2014–2015	→ FeralpiSalò (loan)	13	(1)
Total		91	(8)

International career
2005	Argentina U-17	4	(1)
- * Club domestic league appearances and goals

Juan Ignacio Antonio (born 5 January 1988) is an Argentine former professional football who played as a forward.
