= Roberto Allemandi =

Argentine footballer

Personal information
- Date of birth: 1 August 1912
- Place of birth: Oliva, Argentina
- Position: Defender

Senior career*
Years	Team	Apps	(Gls)
1933–1937	Roma		
1937–1938	Venezia		
1939–1940	M.A.T.E.R.		
- * Club domestic league appearances and goals

Roberto Allemandi (1 August 1912 – ?) was an Argentine footballer.
