= Victor Pozzo =

Argentine footballer

Personal information
- Full name: Victor José Pozzo
- Date of birth: February 1, 1914
- Place of birth: Buenos Aires, Argentina
- Height: 1.74 m (5 ft 8 1/2 in)
- Position: Midfielder

Senior career*
Years	Team	Apps	(Gls)
1933–1935	Racing Club		
1936–1937	Talleres (RE)	15	(0)
1938–1940	Ambrosiana-Inter	6	(0)
1940–1941	Atalanta	28	(1)
1941–1942	Ambrosiana-Inter	17	(0)
1942–1943	Padova	19	(3)
1944–1945	Varese	10	(0)
1945–1948	Parma	91	(5)
1948–1949	Suzzara	37	(3)
1949–1951	Grasshoppers		(0)
- * Club domestic league appearances and goals

Victor José Pozzo (born February 1, 1914, in Buenos Aires) was an Argentine professional football player. He also held Italian citizenship. He played as a midfielder.

== Honours ==
- Serie A champion: 1939/40
- Coppa Italia winner: 1938/39
