= Waldo Sanhueza =

Chilean footballer (1900–1966)

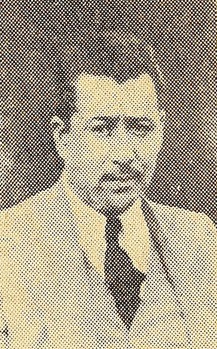
- Sanhueza in 1934

Personal information
- Full name: Waldo Sanhueza Carrasco
- Date of birth: 16 July 1900
- Place of birth: Concepción, Chile
- Date of death: 3 February 1966 (aged 65)
- Place of death: Santiago, Chile
- Height: 1.63 m (5 ft 4 in)

Senior career*
Years	Team	Apps	(Gls)
1918–1919	Ibérico Balompié		
1920–1925	Gold Cross		
1926	Unión Española		
1927–1930	Colo-Colo		

Managerial career
- 1928–1934: Colo-Colo
- * Club domestic league appearances and goals as of 28 August 2015

Waldo Sanhueza Carrasco (16 July 1900 – 3 February 1966) was a Chilean football player and manager. He was honorary president of Santiago Morning and highlighted as player, manager and president of Colo-Colo.
