= Aldo Osorio =

Argentine footballer

Personal information
- Full name: Aldo Arcángel Osorio
- Date of birth: 12 June 1974 (age 52)
- Place of birth: San Nicolás, Buenos Aires, Argentina
- Height: 1.85 m (6 ft 1 in)
- Position: Forward

Senior career*
Years	Team	Apps	(Gls)
1993–96	Almirante Brown	56	(8)
1996–97	Huracán	0	(0)
1997–98	C.A.I.	-	(-)
1998–99	All Boys	12	(13)
1999–2000	Argentinos Juniors	30	(13)
2000–03	Lecce	20	(2)
2002	→ Crotone (loan)	11	(0)
2003–04	→ Talleres (loan)	31	(14)
2004–05	CD Numancia	13	(3)
2005	Quilmes	12	(1)
2005–06	Newell's Old Boys	10	(1)
2006	Argentinos Juniors	12	(1)
- * Club domestic league appearances and goals as of 27 May 2014

Aldo Arcángel Osorio (born 12 June 1974) is an Argentine retired professional footballer. He played as a forward for clubs in Argentina, Italy and Spain.
