= Nicolás Lombardo =

Argentine-Italian footballer (1903–?)

Personal information
- Full name: Nicolás Italo Lombardo
- Date of birth: March 13, 1903
- Place of birth: Buenos Aires, Argentina
- Position: Striker

Senior career*
Years	Team	Apps	(Gls)
1922	River Plate		
1926	Alvear FBC		
1926–1928	Sportivo Palermo		
1928–1929	Barracas Central		
1930	Honor y Patria		
1930–1932	Roma	42	(8)
1933–1936	Pisa	40	(3)

Managerial career
- 1939: Colo-Colo
- * Club domestic league appearances and goals

Nicolás Italo Lombardo, also known as Nicola Italo Lombardo (born March 13, 1903, in Buenos Aires) was an Argentine professional football player and coach. He also held Italian citizenship.

== Career ==
He played for three seasons (42 games, eight goals) in the Serie A for A.S. Roma.

As a football manager, Lombardo led Chilean club Colo-Colo in 1939 for six matches.
