= Pedro Pascual =

Pedro Pascual may refer to:

- Peter Pascual (c. 1227–1299/1300), Mozarabic theologian, bishop, and martyr
- Pasqual Pere Moles (1741–1797), Spanish engraver
- Pedro Pascual Farfán (1870–1945), Peruvian archbishop
- Pedro Pascual Gandarias (1843–1901), Spanish industrialist
- Pedro Pascual (politician) (born 1964), Spanish politician
- Pedro Pascual Segura (1802–1865), Argentine soldier and politician
- Pedro Pascual (footballer) (1915–1997), Spanish footballer
- Pedro Pascual (sailor) (born 1996), American sailor

== See also ==
- Pedro Pascal (born 1975), Chilean-American actor
