= Carlos Rovira =

Carlos Rovira may refer to:

- Carlos Rovira (footballer) (1899-unknown), Argentine footballer
- Carlos Rovira (politician) (born 1954), Argentine politician
- Carlos Rovirosa Pérez International Airport, also known as Villahermosa International Airport, airport in Villahermosa, Mexico
