= Hércules CF B =

Spanish football club

Hércules B
- Full name: Hércules de Alicante Club de Fútbol, S.A.D "B"
- Nickname: Hércules Atlético
- Founded: 1974
- Ground: Divina Pastora; Alicante, Valencian Community, Spain
- Capacity: 300
- President: Valentín Botella
- Head coach: Roberto Campillo
- League: Tercera Federación – Group 6
- 2025–26: Tercera Federación – Group 6, 11th of 18
Home colours	Away colours

Hércules de Alicante Club de Fútbol "B" is a Spanish football team located in Alicante. It is the reserve team of Hércules CF and currently plays in Tercera Federación – Group 6.

Unlike in England, reserve teams in the Spain play in the same football pyramid as their senior team rather than a separate league. However, reserve teams cannot play in the same division as their senior team. Reserve teams are also no longer permitted to contest the Copa del Rey.

== History ==
The first reserve football team of Hércules CF was Alicante CF in the 1960s. In 1974, the reserve club was Hércules Atlético (Hércules Athletic), which ran until the early 1980s. After the disappearance of the subsidiary, in the 1980s, Hércules Promesas (Hércules Promises) was founded, with which it was decided after several seasons away. In the 1990s, it became a subsidiary agreements clubs Mutxamel CF and Español San Vicente. In 1996, he returned to create a subsidiary itself, this time called Hércules B that lasts until today.

=== Club background ===
- Hércules Atlético — (1974–76; 1977–1978)
- Hércules Promesas — (1976–77; 1978–1996)
- Hércules Club de Fútbol "B" – (1996–)

== Season to season ==
Season	Tier	Division	Place	Copa del Rey
1974–75	6	2ª Reg.	1st	
1975–76	5	1ª Reg.	2nd	
1976–77	4	Reg. Pref.	15th	
1977–78	5	Reg. Pref.	9th	
1978–79	5	Reg. Pref.	16th	
1979–80	5	Reg. Pref.	19th	
1980–81	5	Reg. Pref.	19th	
1981–1985	DNP			
1985–86	7	2ª Reg.	1st	
1986–87	6	1ª Reg.	1st	
1987–88	5	Reg. Pref.	9th	
1988–89	5	Reg. Pref.	21st	
1989–90	5	Reg. Pref.	12th	
1990–1996	DNP			DNP
1996–97	7	2ª Reg.	1st	DNP
1997–98	6	1ª Reg.	5th	DNP
1998–99	6	1ª Reg.	1st	DNP
1999–2000	5	Reg. Pref.	4th	DNP
2000–01	5	Reg. Pref.	13th	DNP
2001–02	5	Reg. Pref.	8th	DNP

Season	Tier	Division	Place
2002–03	5	Reg. Pref.	1st
2003–04	4	3ª	20th
2004–05	5	Reg. Pref.	9th
2005–06	5	Reg. Pref.	4th
2006–07	5	Reg. Pref.	12th
2007–08	5	Reg. Pref.	12th
2008–09	5	Reg. Pref.	4th
2009–10	5	Reg. Pref.	12th
2010–11	5	Reg. Pref.	3rd
2011–12	5	Reg. Pref.	2nd
2012–13	5	Reg. Pref.	9th
2013–14	5	Reg. Pref.	7th
2014–15	5	Reg. Pref.	8th
2015–16	5	Reg. Pref.	7th
2016–17	5	Reg. Pref.	5th
2017–18	5	Reg. Pref.	3rd
2018–19	5	Reg. Pref.	3rd
2019–20	4	3ª	14th
2020–21	4	3ª	8th / 1st
2021–22	5	3ª RFEF	11th

Season	Tier	Division	Place
2022–23	5	3ª Fed.	16th
2023–24	6	Lliga Com.	9th
2024–25	6	Lliga Com.	1st
2025–26	5	3ª Fed.	11th
2026–27	5	3ª Fed.	

- 3 seasons in Tercera División
- 4 seasons in Tercera Federación/Tercera División RFEF

== Notable former players ==
- (Spain) Toño
- (Spain) Fernando Béjar
- (Spain) Manolo Martínez
- (Spain) Cristian Bustos
- (Spain) Máyor
- (Spain) Vicente Pérez
- (Spain) Samuel Llorca
- (Spain) Miguel de las Cuevas
- (Spain) Raúl Ruiz
- (Spain) Kiko Femenía
- (Bosnia and Herzegovina) Eldin Hadžić
- (Morocco) Abde Ezzalzouli

== Reserve team coach history ==
Hércules Atlético

- (Spain) Manolet (1974–1977)
- (Spain) Emilio Aparicio Rodríguez (1977–1978)

Hércules Promesas

- (Spain) Mariano Vivancos Sánchez, "Loves" (1978–1979)
- (Spain) Juan Antonio Carcelén (1985–1987)
- (Spain) Joaquín Carbonell (1987–1988)
- (Spain) Manuel Murcia (1988–1989)
- (Spain) Juan Antonio Carcelén (1989–1990)

Hércules B

- (Argentina) Charles (1996–1998)
- (Paraguay) Humberto Núñez (1998–2000)
- (Spain) Joaquín Carbonell (2000)
- (Spain) Teo Rastrojo (2000–2001)
- (Spain) David de la Hera (2001–2002)
- (Serbia) Josip Višnjić (2002–2003)
- (Spain) Quique Medina (2003)
- (Spain) Pedro Valdo (2003–2004)
- (Spain) Juan Sanchís (2004–2005)
- (Spain) Segundo Amorós (2005–2008)
- (Argentina) Charles (2008–2009)
- (Spain) Ángel Linares (2009–2011)
- (Spain) Vicente Borge (2011–2013)
- (Spain) José Vicente Lledó (2013–)

== Achievements ==
- Segunda Regional:
  - Winners (1): 1996–97
- Primera Regional:
  - Winners (1): 1998–99
- Regional Preferente:
  - Winners (1): 2002–03
