= Villajoyosa CF =

Spanish football club

Villajoyosa
- Full name: Villajoyosa Club de Fútbol
- Founded: 1942; 84 years ago
- Ground: Nou Pla, Vila Joiosa, Valencia, Spain
- Capacity: 4,000
- President: (Spain) Bienvenido Iborra
- Head coach: (Spain) Fran Garay
- League: Primera FFCV – Group 4
- 2025–26: Segona FFCV – Group 7, 2nd of 15 (promoted via play-offs)
Home colours	Away colours

Villajoyosa Club de Fútbol is a Spanish football team based in Vila Joiosa, in the autonomous community of Valencia. Founded in 1942, in the 2022–23 season, the club competes in Primera FFCV – Group 4, holding home matches at the Estadio Nou Pla, with a capacity of 4,000.

== Honours ==
- North Africa Championship:
  - Winners (1): 1929–30

== Season to season ==
Season	Tier	Division	Place	Copa del Rey
1943–44	4	1ª Reg.	1st	
1944–45	5	2ª Reg.	1st	
1945–1956	DNP			
1956–57	4	1ª Reg.	1st	
1957–58	3	3ª	7th	
1958–59	3	3ª	10th	
1959–60	3	3ª	16th	
1960–61	4	1ª Reg.	6th	
1961–62	4	1ª Reg.	4th	
1962–63	4	1ª Reg.	15th	
1963–64	4	1ª Reg.	5th	
1964–65	4	1ª Reg.	3rd	
1965–66	4	1ª Reg.	4th	
1966–67	4	1ª Reg.	3rd	
1967–68	4	1ª Reg.	11th	
1968–69	4	1ª Reg.	16th	
1969–70	5	2ª Reg.	2nd	
1970–71	5	2ª Reg.	1st	
1971–72	4	Reg. Pref.	9th	
1972–73	4	Reg. Pref.	17th	

Season	Tier	Division	Place	Copa del Rey
1973–74	4	Reg. Pref.	5th	
1974–75	4	Reg. Pref.	15th	
1975–76	5	1ª Reg.	7th	
1976–77	4	Reg. Pref.	12th	
1977–78	5	Reg. Pref.	17th	
1978–79	6	1ª Reg.	3rd	
1979–80	6	1ª Reg.	4th	
1980–81	6	1ª Reg.	4th	
1981–82	5	Reg. Pref.	4th	
1982–83	5	Reg. Pref.	2nd	
1983–84	4	3ª	7th	
1984–85	4	3ª	6th	
1985–86	4	3ª	10th	First round
1986–87	4	3ª	8th	
1987–88	4	3ª	7th	
1988–89	4	3ª	10th	
1989–90	4	3ª	16th	
1990–91	4	3ª	8th	
1991–92	4	3ª	8th	
1992–93	5	Reg. Pref.	2nd	

Season	Tier	Division	Place	Copa del Rey
1993–94	5	Reg. Pref.	13th	
1994–95	5	Reg. Pref.	18th	
1995–96	5	Reg. Pref.	16th	
1996–97	5	Reg. Pref.	7th	
1997–98	5	Reg. Pref.	3rd	
1998–99	5	Reg. Pref.	2nd	
1999–2000	5	Reg. Pref.	1st	
2000–01	5	Reg. Pref.	2nd	
2001–02	4	3ª	4th	
2002–03	4	3ª	2nd	
2003–04	3	2ª B	12th	
2004–05	3	2ª B	6th	
2005–06	3	2ª B	8th	Second round
2006–07	3	2ª B	8th	First round
2007–08	3	2ª B	16th	
2008–09	4	3ª	1st	
2009–10	3	2ªB	17th	Second round
2010–11	4	3ª	19th	
2011–12	5	Reg. Pref.	6th	
2012–13	5	Reg. Pref.	13th	

Season	Tier	Division	Place	Copa del Rey
2013–14	5	Reg. Pref.	3rd	
2014–15	5	Reg. Pref.	3rd	
2015–16	5	Reg. Pref.	8th	
2016–17	5	Reg. Pref.	1st	
2017–18	5	Reg. Pref.	2nd	
2018–19	5	Reg. Pref.	2nd	
2019–20	5	Reg. Pref.	1st	
2020–21	4	3ª	9th / 4th	
2021–22	5	3ª RFEF	19th	
2022–23	6	Reg. Pref.	15th	
2023–24	7	1ª FFCV	12th	
2024–25	7	1ª FFCV	14th	
2025–26	8	2ª FFCV	2nd	
2026–27	7	1ª FFCV		

- 6 seasons in Segunda División B
- 17 seasons in Tercera División
- 1 season in Tercera División RFEF

== Notable former players ==
- (Equatorial Guinea) Raúl Fabiani
- (Spain) Vicente Borge
- (Spain) José Mañuz

== Notable former coaches ==
- (Spain) Vicente Borge
- (Spain) Joaquín Carbonell
- (Spain) Luis García
