= Pedro Pascual (footballer) =

Argentine footballer (1915–1997)

Personal information
- Full name: Pedro Pascual Ros
- Date of birth: 15 August 1915
- Place of birth: Buenos Aires, Argentina
- Date of death: 30 November 1997 (aged 82)
- Place of death: Lleida, Catalonia, Spain
- Position: Forward

Senior career*
| Years | Team | Apps | (Gls) |
| 1936–1940 | Barcelona | 8 | (4) |
| 1940–1941 | Deportivo de La Coruña | | |
| 1941–1942 | Terrassa | | |
| 1942–1943 | Lleida | | |
| 1943–1944 | Condal | | |
| 1944 | Mataró | | |
- * Club domestic league appearances and goals

Pedro Pascual Ros (15 August 1915 – 30 November 1997) was an Argentine footballer who played as a forward for Barcelona and Deportivo de La Coruña in the early 1940s.

== Playing career ==
Born on 15 August 1915 in the Argentine city of Buenos Aires, Pascual was still a child when his family moved to Barcelona, where he began his football career in the youth ranks of Barça, making his debut for the club's first team in a friendly match against Júpiter on 18 April 1936, aged 21. He had to wait until the end of the Spanish Civil War in 1939 to finally make his official competitive debut for Barça in a Catalan championship match against Badalona on 8 October 1939, scoring once in an eventual 2–1 win. In doing so, he became only the fourth Argentine footballer to play for Barça, only after Mariano Bori, (1909–1914), Carlos Rovira, and Emilio Sagi-Barba (both in the 1910s), an exclusive group that currently also includes the likes of Mateo Nicolau, Lionel Messi, and Sergio Agüero.

During the 1939–40 season, Pascual scored 6 goals in 11 official matches, including four goals in 8 La Liga matches, which came in the form of a hat-trick against Athletic Bilbao on 14 January 1940, in an eventual 5–7 loss, and then two weeks later, on 28 January, he scored in the El Clásico in an eventual 2–1 loss.

At the end of the season, however, Pascual left Barça, going on to play one season at Deportivo de La Coruña (1940–41), Terrassa (1941–42), Lleida (1942–43), and Condal (1943–44), before retiring at Mataró in 1944, aged 29.

== Death ==
Pascual died in Lleida, Catalonia, on 30 November 1997, at the age of 82.

== See also ==
- List of Argentine footballers in La Liga
- List of La Liga hat-tricks
