= List of Argentine footballers in La Liga =

The list of Argentine men's footballers in La Liga records the association football players from Argentina who have appeared at least once for a team in the Spanish league. Entries in bold denote players still active in actual season.

== A ==
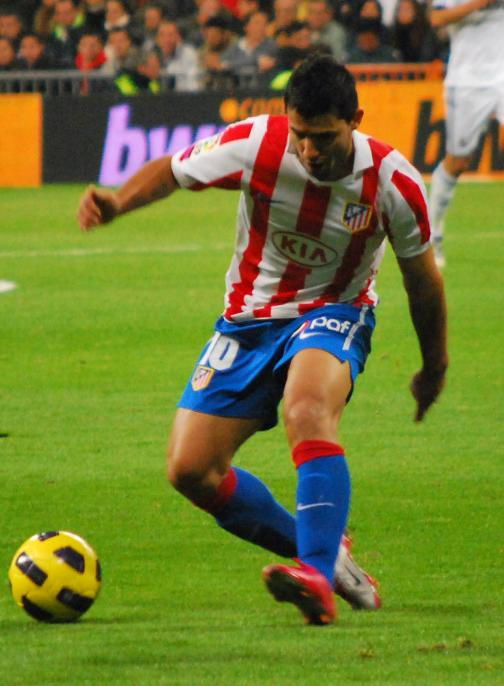
Sergio Agüero playing for Atlético Madrid in 2012

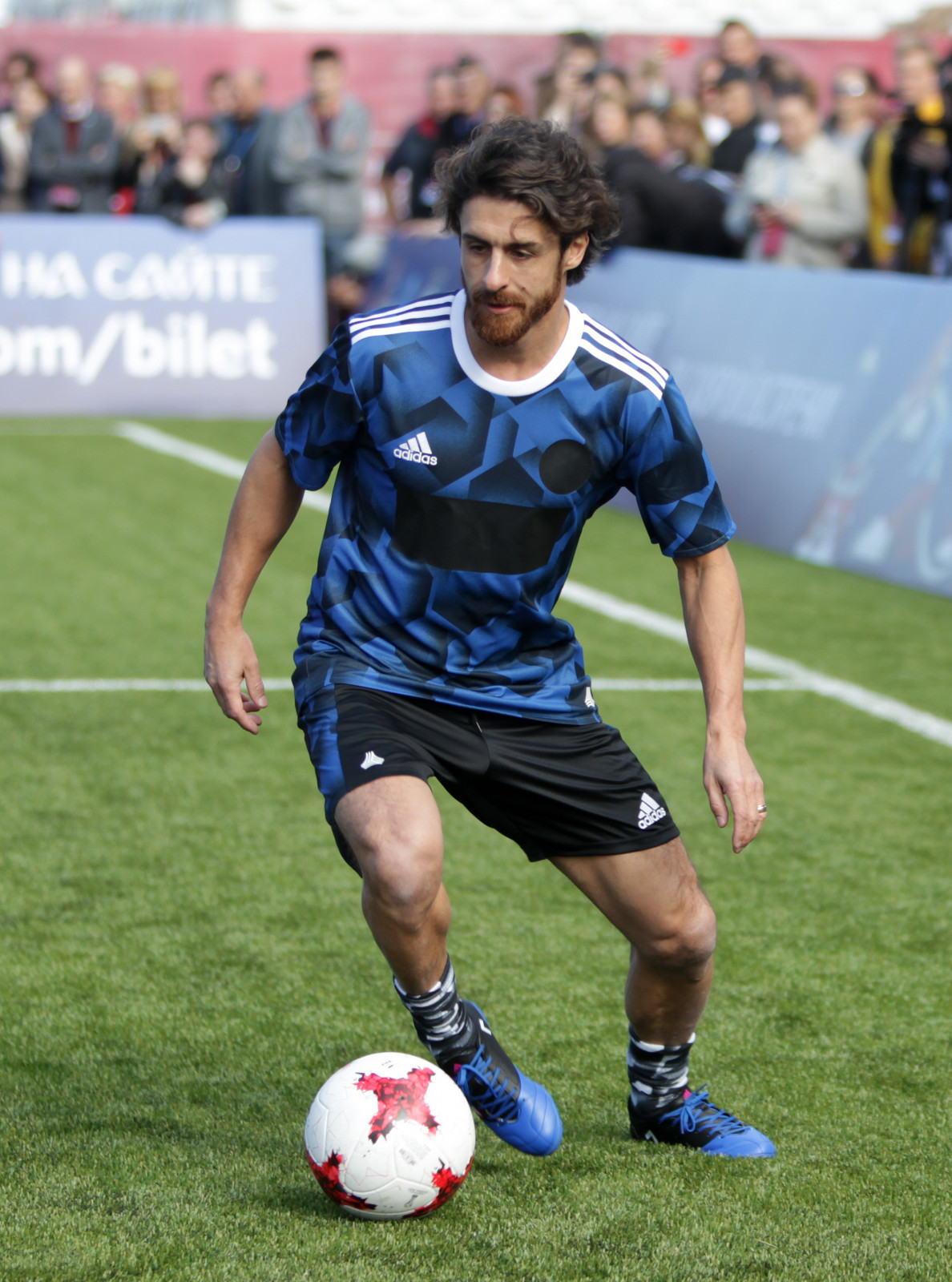
Pablo Aimar in 2017

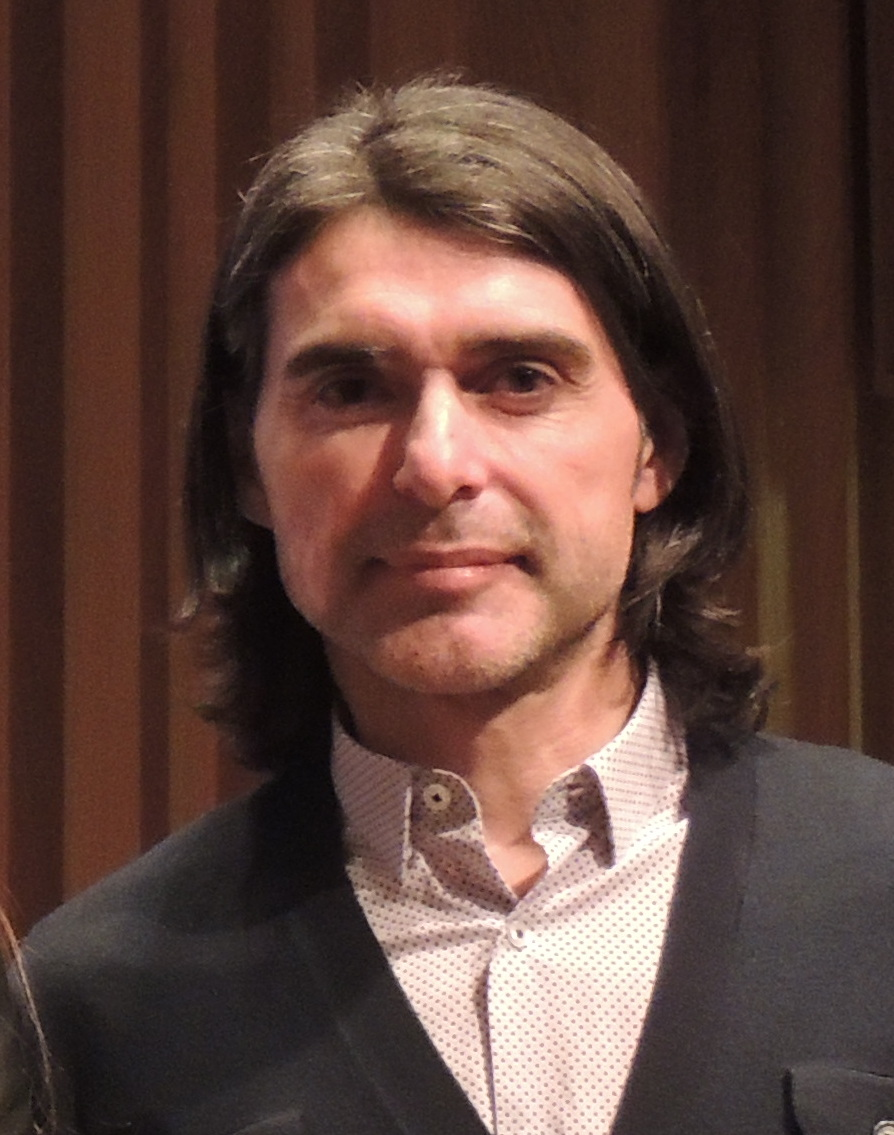
Roberto Ayala in 2018

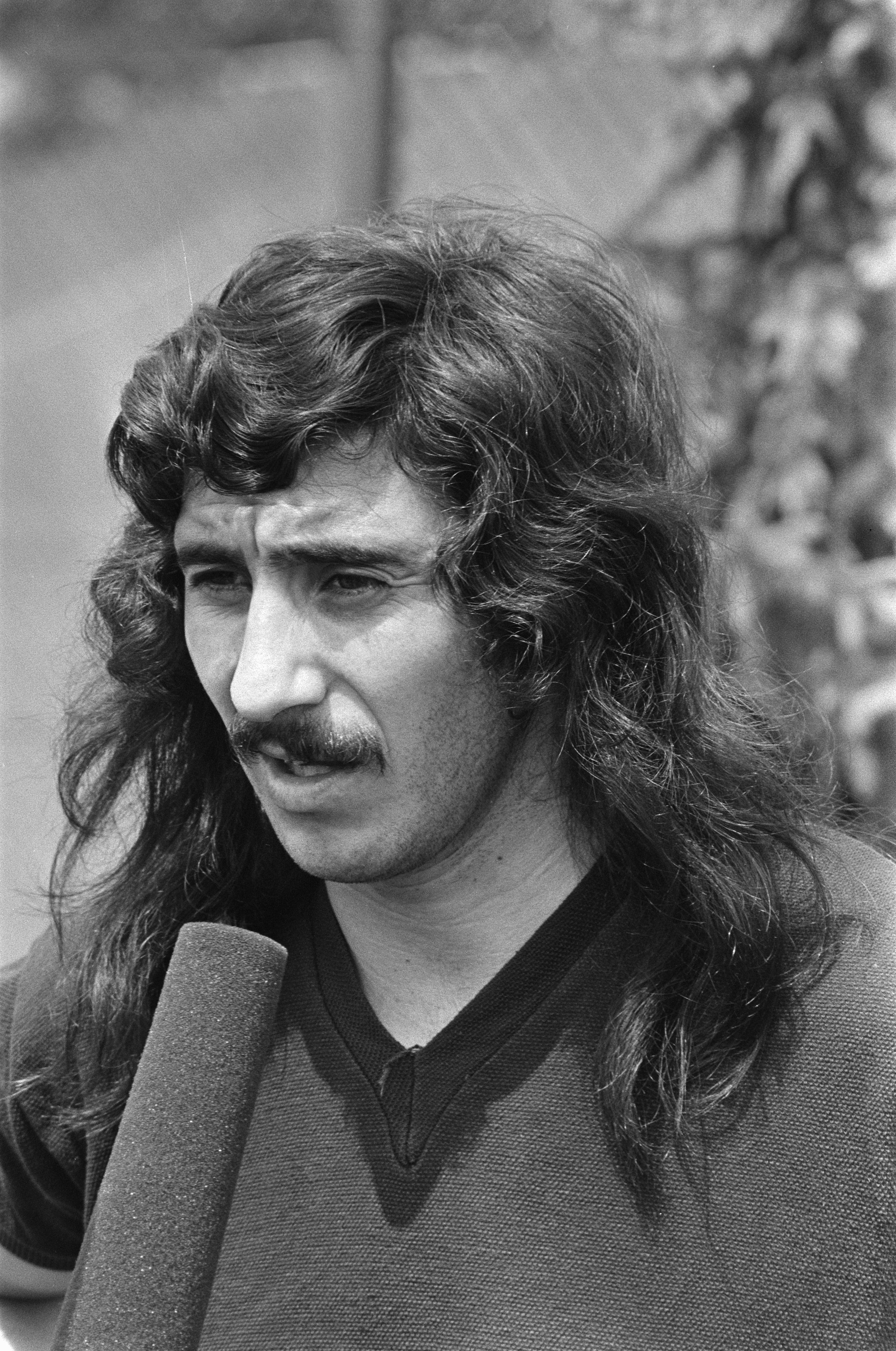
Rubén Ayala in 1974

- Roberto Abbondanzieri – Getafe – 2006–09
- David Ángel Abraham – Getafe – 2012–13
- José Acciari – Murcia – 2003–04
- Lautaro Acosta – Sevilla, Racing – 2008–12
- Marcos Acuña – Sevilla – 2020–24
- Luis Héctor Adorno – Burgos, Hércules – 1978–80, 81–82
- Miguel Ángel Adorno – Valencia – 1971–75, 76–77
- Sergio Agüero – Atlético Madrid, Barcelona – 2006–11, 21–22
- Marcos Aguirre – Valladolid – 2007–09
- Ramón Aguirre Suárez – Granada, Salamanca – 1971–75
- Pablo Aimar – Valencia, Zaragoza – 2000–08
- Ricardo Albisbeascoechea "Albis" – Málaga, Logroñés, Valladolid – 1982–85, 87–90
- Carlos Alfaro Moreno – Espanyol – 1991–92
- Fernando Alí – Valladolid – 1981–83
- Tadeo Allende – Celta – 2023–25
- Thiago Almada – Atlético Madrid – 2025–26
- Matías Almeyda – Sevilla – 1996–97
- Luis Ramón Alonso – Elche – 1970–71
- Matías Alustiza – Xerez – 2009–10
- Carlos Álvarez – Oviedo – 1958–63
- Cristian Darío Álvarez – Espanyol, Rayo – 2008–13, 14–15
- Cristian Osvaldo Álvarez – Racing – 2003–05, 06–07
- **Julián Álvarez** – **Atlético Madrid** – 2024–
- Pablo Álvarez – Zaragoza – 2011–12
- Gabriel Amato – Hércules, Mallorca, Betis, Albacete – 1996–98, 01–02, 03–04
- Marcos Angeleri – Málaga – 2013–16
- Fabrizio Angileri – Getafe – 2022–24
- Cristian Ansaldi – Atlético Madrid – 2014–15
- Eduardo Anzarda – Real Madrid, Betis – 1971–73, 74–78, 79–80
- Daniel Aquino – Albacete, Betis, Rayo – 1991–92, 94–96
- Héctor Aramendi – Valladolid – 1959–61, 62–64
- Sergio Araujo – Las Palmas – 2015–17, 17–18
- Domingo Arcángel – Deportivo – 1964–65
- Mariano Armentano – Osasuna – 2000–02
- Emiliano Armenteros – Sevilla, Xerez, Rayo, Osasuna – 2008–10, 11–14
- Rodolfo Arruabarrena – Villarreal – 2000–07
- Claudio Arzeno – Racing – 1998–01, 02–03
- Daniel Astegiano – Rayo – 1977–79
- Martín Astudillo – Alavés, Osasuna – 1999–03, 05–06, 07–08
- Ezequiel Ávila – Huesca, Osasuna, Betis – 2018–26
- Roberto Ayala – Valencia, Zaragoza – 2000–08, 09–10
- Rubén Ayala – Atlético Madrid – 1973–80
- Federico Azcárate – Murcia – 2003–04

== B ==
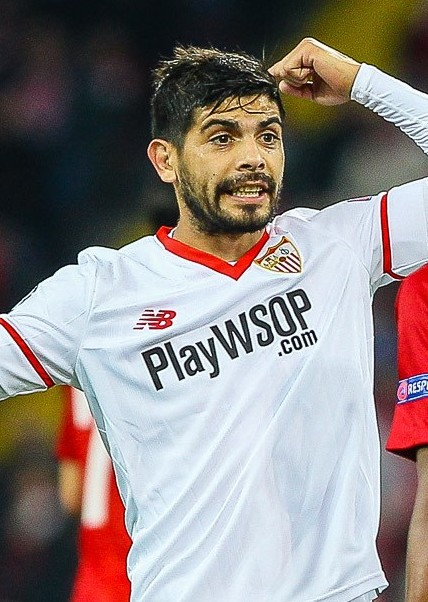
Éver Banega playing for Sevilla in 2017

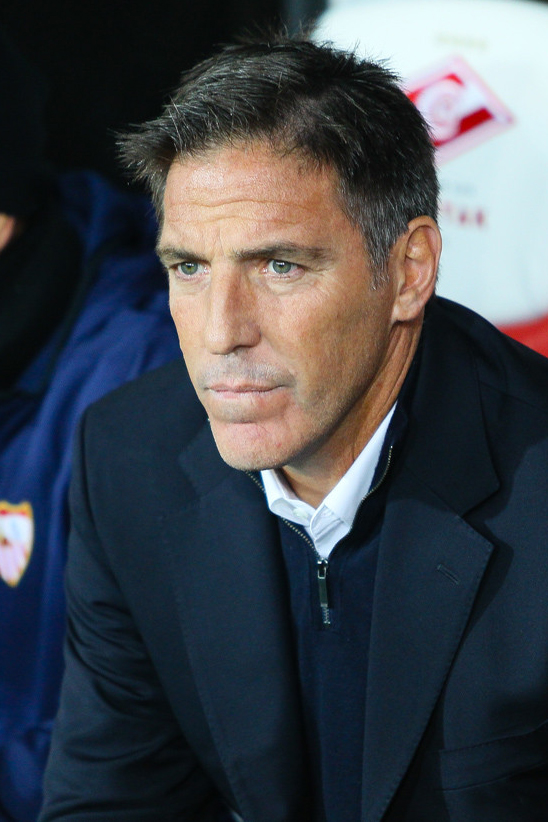
Eduardo Berizzo as Sevilla manager in 2017

- Éver Banega – Valencia, Atlético Madrid, Sevilla – 2007–14, 14–16, 17–20
- Juan Barbas – Zaragoza – 1982–85
- Mariano Barbosa – Villarreal, Sevilla – 2005–07, 14–16, 17–18
- Valentín Barco – Sevilla – 2024–25
- Enzo Barrenechea – Valencia – 2024–25
- Rolando Barrera – Mallorca – 1983–84
- Gustavo Barros Schelotto – Villarreal – 2000–01
- Gustavo Bartelt – Rayo – 2000–01
- Federico Basavilbaso – Tenerife – 1998–99, 01–02
- Christian Bassedas – Tenerife – 2001–02
- Adrián Bastía – Espanyol – 2003–04
- José Basualdo – Extremadura – 1996–97
- **Augusto Batalla** – Granada, **Rayo** – 2023–
- Rodrigo Battaglia – Alavés, Mallorca – 2020–23
- Sebastián Battaglia – Villarreal – 2003–05
- Francisco Bayo – Celta – 1958–59
- Lucas Beltrán – Valencia – 2025–26
- Juan Benavídez – Espanyol, Granada – 1955–60
- Darío Benedetto – Elche – 2021–22
- Eduardo Berizzo – Celta, Cádiz – 2000–04, 05–06
- Hernán Bernardello – Almería – 2009–12
- Sergio Berti – Zaragoza – 1995–96
- Nicolás Bertolo – Zaragoza – 2010–11
- Daniel Bertoni – Sevilla – 1978–80
- Leonardo Biagini – Atlético Madrid, Mérida, Mallorca – 1995–03
- Albano Bizzarri – Real Madrid, Valladolid, Gimnàstic – 1998–04, 06–07
- Lautaro Blanco – Elche – 2022–23
- Roberto Bonano – Barcelona, Murcia, Alavés – 2001–04, 05–06
- Fabián Bonhoff – Castellón – 1989–90
- Juan José Borrelli – Oviedo – 1996–97
- **Lucas Boyé** – Celta, Elche, Granada, **Alavés** – 2017–18, 20–24, 25–
- Pablo Brandán – Alavés – 2000–01
- Miguel Brindisi – Las Palmas – 1976–79
- Carlos Brizzola – Sevilla, Salamanca – 1976–77, 79–81, 82–83
- José Luis Brown – Murcia – 1987–89
- Juan Ignacio Brunet – Granada – 2020–21
- Emiliano "Emi" Buendía – Getafe – 2014–16
- José María Buljubasich – Tenerife, Oviedo – 1994–96, 97–98
- Diego Buonanotte – Málaga, Granada – 2011–14
- **Facundo Buonanotte** – **Elche** – 2026–
- Esteban Burgos – Eibar – 2019–21
- Germán Burgos – Mallorca, Atlético Madrid – 1999–01, 02–04

== C ==
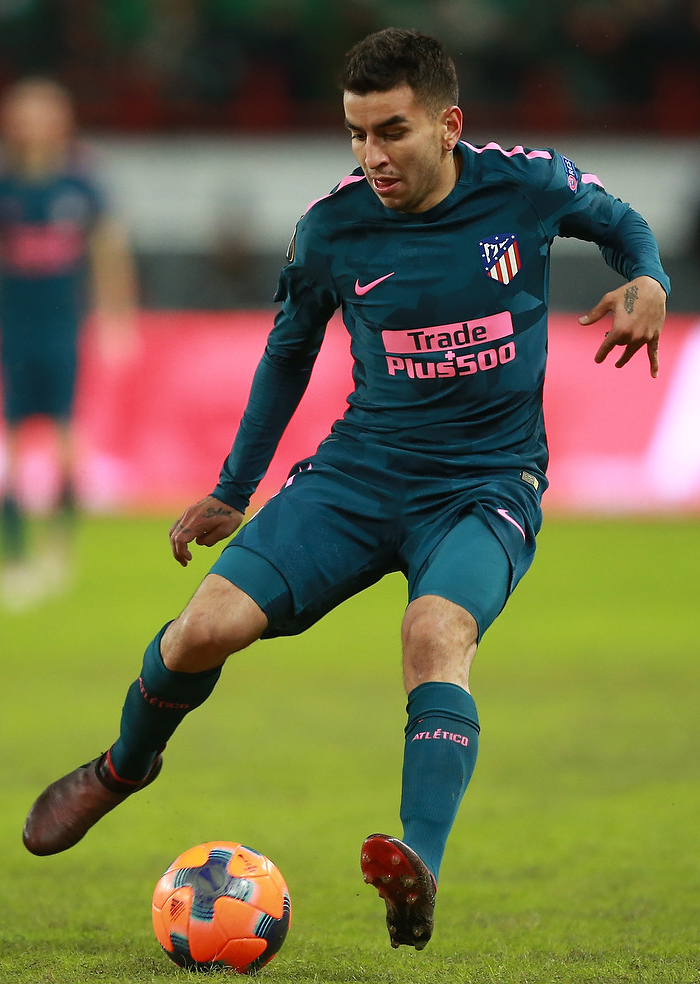
Ángel Correa playing for Atlético Madrid in 2018

- Wilfredo Daniel "Willy" Caballero – Málaga – 2010–14
- Gustavo Cabral – Levante, Celta – 2011–19
- Luis Cabrera – Atlético Madrid, Cádiz, Castellón – 1980–88, 89–90
- Fernando Cáceres – Zaragoza, Valencia, Celta – 1993–04
- Juan Pablo Caffa – Betis – 2006–08
- Florencio Caffaratti – Barcelona – 1947–49
- Diego Cagna – Villarreal – 2000–02
- Pablo Calandria – Málaga – 2001–02
- Gabriel Calderón – Betis – 1983–87
- Jonathan Calleri – Las Palmas, Alavés, Espanyol, Osasuna – 2017–21
- José María Calvo – Gimnàstic, Recreativo – 2006–08
- Esteban Cambiasso – Real Madrid – 2002–04
- Juan Camer – Espanyol, Málaga – 1948–51
- Gustavo Campagnuolo – Valencia – 1997–98
- Ernesto Candía – Atlético Madrid – 1948–50
- Juan Cantarutti – Málaga – 1979–80
- Martín Cardetti – Salamanca, Valladolid – 1998–99, 03–04
- Daniel Carnevali – Las Palmas – 1973–79
- Ramón Carranza – Granada, Espanyol – 1958–62, 63–64
- Guido Carrillo – Leganés, Elche – 2018–22
- Juan Pablo Carrizo – Zaragoza – 2009–10
- Federico Cartabia – Valencia, Córdoba, Deportivo – 2013–17, 17–18
- Carlos Casartelli – Salamanca, Espanyol – 1998–00
- Gastón Casas – Betis – 2001–03
- Santiago Cáseres – Villarreal – 2018–19
- Gonzalo Castellani – Villarreal – 2011–12
- Valentín Castellanos – Girona – 2022–23
- Ezequiel Castillo – Espanyol, Tenerife, Rayo – 1988–89, 90–97
- Raúl Castronovo – Málaga, Hércules, Salamanca – 1974–75, 76–79
- Pablo Cavallero – Espanyol, Celta, Levante – 1999–04, 06–07
- José Luis Ceballos – Las Palmas – 1980–81
- Emanuel Cecchini – Málaga – 2017–18
- Franco Cervi – Celta – 2021–25
- José Chamot – Atlético Madrid – 1998–00
- Nereo Champagne – Leganés – 2016–18
- Alfonso Troisi "Charles" – Hércules, Almería – 1976–81
- Pablo Chavarría – Mallorca – 2019–20
- Pedro Chazarreta – Burgos, Murcia – 1977–79, 80–81
- Julián Chicco – Leganés – 2024–25
- Leandro Chichizola – Las Palmas, Getafe – 2017–19
- José Juan Cioffi – Burgos – 1977–78
- Rubén Ciraolo – Valencia – 1987–89
- Óscar Coll – Espanyol – 1956–61
- Fabricio Coloccini – Alavés, Atlético Madrid, Villarreal, Deportivo – 2001–04, 04–08
- Santiago Colombatto – Oviedo – 2025–26
- Diego Colotto – Deportivo, Espanyol – 2008–11, 12–15
- Cristián Colusso – Sevilla – 1996–97
- Eduardo Commisso – Hércules – 1975–78
- Tomás Conechny – Alavés – 2024–25
- Julio Corcuera – Deportivo, Jaén – 1950–55, 56–57
- Ángel Correa – Atlético Madrid – 2015–25
- Joaquín Correa – Sevilla – 2016–18
- Oswaldo Cortés – Elche – 1974–78
- Bernardo Cos – Barcelona, Burgos – 1972–75, 76–78
- Alberto "Tino" Costa – Valencia – 2010–13
- Franco Costanzo – Alavés – 2005–06
- Eduardo Coudet – Celta – 2002–03
- Juan Crespín – Zaragoza, Cádiz – 1988–89, 92–93
- Diego Crosa – Betis – 1999–00, 01–02
- Braian Cufré – Mallorca – 2022–23
- Emmanuel Culio – Las Palmas – 2015–16

== D ==
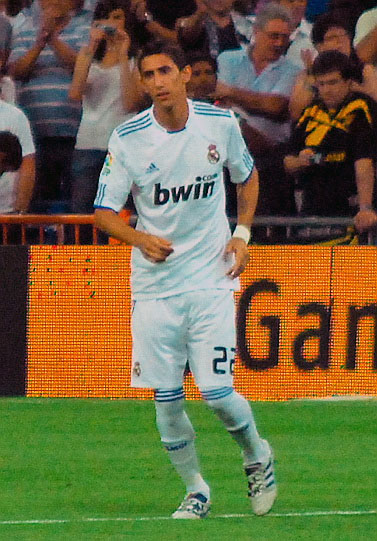
Ángel Di María playing for Real Madrid in 2010

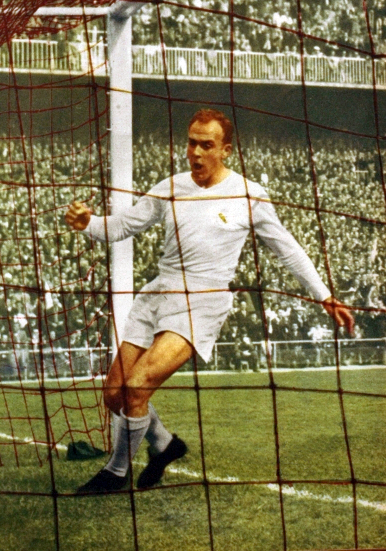
Alfredo Di Stéfano scoring for Real Madrid in 1959

- Andrés D'Alessandro – Zaragoza – 2006–08
- Roberto D'Alessandro – Salamanca – 1974–81, 82–84
- Jesús Dátolo – Espanyol – 2010–12
- Pablo de Blasis – Eibar – 2018–20
- Martín Demichelis – Málaga, Espanyol – 2010–13, 16–17
- Rodrigo De Paul – Valencia, Atlético Madrid – 2014–16, 21–25
- Óscar Dertycia – Cádiz, Tenerife, Albacete – 1990–95
- Hermes Desio – Celta, Alavés – 1994–96, 98–03
- Daniel "Cata" Díaz – Getafe, Atlético Madrid – 2007–13
- Christian Díaz – Mallorca, Albacete – 2001–02, 03–04
- Pablo Diaz – Sporting, Zaragoza – 1990–99
- José Diéguez – Sevilla – 1957–67
- Ángel Di María – Real Madrid – 2010–14
- Vicente Di Paola – Lleida – 1950–51
- Marcos Aurelio Di Paulo – Barcelona – 1948–51
- Franco Di Santo – Rayo – 2018–19
- Alfredo Di Stéfano – Real Madrid, Espanyol – 1953–66
- **Matías Dituro** – Celta, **Elche** – 2021–22, 25–
- Alejandro "Chori" Domínguez – Valencia, Rayo – 2009–11, 12–13
- Federico Domínguez – Espanyol – 1998–99
- Rogelio Domínguez – Real Madrid – 1957–62
- Jorge Dominichi – Elche – 1975–77
- Víctor Doria – Sporting – 1973–76, 77–83
- Mauro dos Santos – Almería, Eibar, Leganés – 2014–18
- Jorge Doval – Elche – 1973–74
- Sebastián Dubarbier – Almería – 2013–15
- Carlos Duré – Extremadura – 1996–97, 98–99
- Aldo Duscher – Deportivo, Racing, Sevilla, Espanyol – 2000–11

== E ==
- Carlos Echarri – Las Palmas – 1979–80
- Juan Echecopar – Granada, Murcia – 1973–75
- Claudio Echeverri – Girona – 2025–26
- Gonzalo Escalante – Eibar, Alavés, Cádiz – 2015–20, 21–22, 22–24
- Damián Escudero – Valladolid, Villarreal – 2008–10
- Juan Eduardo Esnáider – Real Madrid, Zaragoza, Atlético Madrid, Espanyol, Murcia – 1990–91, 92–99, 00–01, 03–04
- Marcelo Espina – Racing – 1999–01
- Cristian Espinoza – Alavés – 2016–17
- Maximiliano Estévez – Racing – 2000–01

== F ==
- Daniel Fagiani – Valencia – 1999–00
- José Fantaguzzi – Betis – 1987–88
- Luis Fariña – Deportivo, Rayo – 2014–16
- Federico Fazio – Sevilla – 2007–14, 15–16
- Darío Felman – Valencia – 1977–83
- Carlos Fenoy – Celta, Valladolid – 1976–77, 78–79, 80–88
- Augusto Fernández – Celta, Atlético Madrid, Cádiz – 2012–18, 20–21
- Favio Fernández – Espanyol – 1996–97
- Federico Fernández – Getafe, Elche – 2012–13, 22–23
- Nicolás Fernández – Elche – 2022–23
- Rubén Fernández – Celta – 1982–83
- Teodoro Fernández – Las Palmas – 1972–78
- **Thiago Fernández** – Oviedo, **Levante** – 2025–
- Tubo Fernández – Cádiz – 1992–93
- Carlos Ferrer – Espanyol – 1939–40
- Enzo Ferrero – Sporting – 1975–76, 77–85
- Óscar Ferrero – Sporting, Castellón – 1978–79, 80–82
- Facundo Ferreyra – Espanyol – 2018–20
- Luciano Figueroa – Villarreal – 2004–06
- Ubaldo Fillol – Atlético Madrid – 1985–86
- Mario Finarolli – Elche – 1976–78
- Daniel Flores – Rayo – 1978–79
- José Óscar "Turu" Flores – Deportivo, Valladolid, Mallorca – 1998–03
- Juan Forlín – Espanyol – 2009–13
- Juan Carlos Forneris – Granada, Elche – 1959–61, 62–66
- Élio Fortunato – Las Palmas – 1981–83
- **Juan Foyth** – **Villarreal** – 2020–
- Rafael Franco – Deportivo, Valladolid – 1948–52
- Darío Franco – Zaragoza – 1991–95
- Leo Franco – Mallorca, Atlético Madrid, Zaragoza – 1999–13
- Matías Fritzler – Hércules – 2010–11
- Fabricio Fuentes – Villarreal – 2006–09
- Esteban Fuertes – Tenerife – 2001–02
- Ramiro Funes Mori – Villarreal – 2018–21

== G ==
- Iván Gabrich – Mérida, Extremadura, Mallorca – 1997–00
- Jorge Gabrich – Barcelona – 1983–84
- Fernando Gago – Real Madrid, Valencia – 2006–11, 12–13
- Nicolás Gaitán – Atlético Madrid – 2016–18
- Walter Gaitán – Villarreal – 1998–99, 00–01
- Luciano Galletti – Zaragoza, Atlético Madrid – 2001–02, 03–07
- Fernando Gamboa – Oviedo – 1996–98
- Leonel Gancedo – Osasuna, Murcia – 2000–04
- Antonio Garabal – Atlético Madrid – 1956–58
- Ezequiel Garay – Racing, Real Madrid, Valencia – 2005–11, 16–20
- Antonio García – Salamanca – 1975–78
- Horacio García – Jaén – 1957–58
- Mateo García – Las Palmas – 2016–17
- Oswaldo García – Deportivo, Espanyol, Granada – 1950–58
- Óscar Garro – Celta, Sporting – 1948–49, 51–52
- Roberto Gasparini – Málaga – 1982–83
- Federico Gattoni – Sevilla – 2023–24, 25–26
- Paulo Gazzaniga – Elche, Girona – 2020–21, 22–26
- Humberto Giménez – Barcelona – 1949–50
- Sebastián Giménez – Hércules – 1975–76
- Leandro Gioda – Xerez – 2009–10
- Carmelo Giuliano – Hércules – 1974–81
- Blas Giunta – Murcia – 1988–89
- Juan Gómez – Real Sociedad – 1996–00
- Papu Gómez – Sevilla – 2020–23
- Raúl Gómez – Celta – 1958–59
- **Valentín Gómez** – **Betis** – 2025–
- Pedro Gómez Vila – Zaragoza – 1972–73
- Juan Antonio Gómez Voglino – Elche – 1974–78
- Esteban González – Málaga – 1989–90
- Cristian "Kily" González – Zaragoza, Valencia – 1996–03
- Ignacio "Nacho" González – Las Palmas – 2000–02
- Nicolás "Nico" González – Atlético Madrid – 2025–26
- Óscar González – Rayo, Atlético Madrid – 1977–80
- Silvio González – Numancia – 2004–05
- Patricio Graff – Rayo, Numancia – 2001–03, 04–05
- Jorge Griffa – Atlético Madrid, Espanyol – 1959–69, 70–71
- Carlos Guerini – Málaga, Real Madrid – 1973–79
- Ernesto Gutiérrez – Celta – 1956–58
- Jonás Gutiérrez – Mallorca, Deportivo – 2005–08, 15–16
- Marcelo Gutiérrez – Racing – 1982–83

== H ==
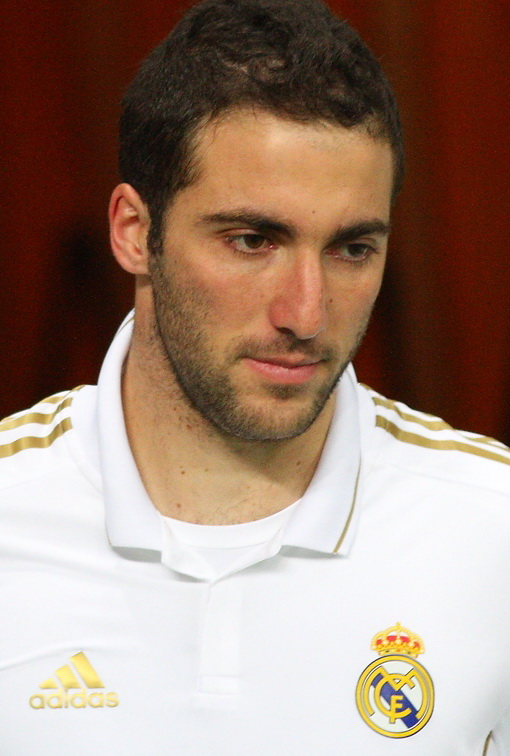
Gonzalo Higuaín with Real Madrid in 2012

- Gabriel Heinze – Valladolid, Real Madrid – 1999–01, 07–09
- Ramón Heredia – Atlético Madrid – 1973–77
- Germán Herrera – Real Sociedad – 2006–07
- Martín Herrera – Alavés – 1999–02
- Horacio Herrero – Valencia, Racing – 1948–49, 50–52
- Gonzalo Higuaín – Real Madrid – 2006–13
- Mario Husillos – Murcia, Cádiz – 1983–85, 89–91

== I ==
- Ariel Ibagaza – Mallorca, Atlético Madrid, Villarreal – 1998–10
- Hugo Ibarra – Espanyol – 2004–05
- José Raúl Iglesias – Valencia – 1983–84
- Antonio Imbelloni – Real Madrid – 1950–51
- Emanuel Insúa – Granada – 2014–15
- Emiliano Insúa – Atlético Madrid, Rayo – 2012–15
- Federico Insúa – Málaga – 2003–04
- Rubén Insúa – Las Palmas – 1985–86
- Horacio Insurralde – Elche – 1977–78
- Luis Islas – Logroñés – 1989–90

== J ==
- Franco Jara – Granada – 2011–12

== K ==
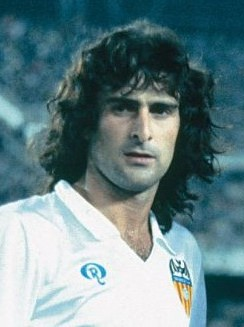
Mario Kempes with Valencia in 1982

- Mario Kempes – Valencia, Hércules – 1976–81, 82–86
- Mario Killer – Sporting – 1975–76, 77–78
- Diego Klimowicz – Rayo, Valladolid – 1996–97, 97–99
- Matías Kranevitter – Atlético Madrid, Sevilla – 2015–17

== L ==
- Erik Lamela – Sevilla – 2021–24
- Ángel Landucci – Sporting – 1973–76
- Joaquín Larrivey – Rayo, Celta – 2013–15
- Diego Latorre – Tenerife, Salamanca – 1992–96
- Juan Laureano "Lauren" – Murcia – 1950–51
- Jeremías Ledesma – Cádiz – 2020–24
- Ramón León – Oviedo – 1961–62
- Matías Lequi – Atlético Madrid, Celta – 2003–04, 05–07
- Lucas Licht – Getafe – 2006–10
- Óscar Limia – Cádiz – 2005–06
- Olegario Lisboa – Espanyol – 1963–64
- Lucas Lobos – Cádiz – 2005–06
- **Giovani Lo Celso** – **Betis**, Villarreal – 2018–19, 21–23, 24–
- Gabriel Loeschbor – Murcia – 2003–04
- Ricardo Logiácono – Málaga – 1979–80
- Gustavo Lombardi – Salamanca, Alavés – 1997–98, 01–02
- **Kevin Lomónaco** – **Elche** – 2026–
- Raúl Longhi – Espanyol – 1976–81
- Ariel "Chupa" López – Mallorca – 1998–99
- Claudio López – Valencia – 1996–00
- Gustavo López – Zaragoza, Celta – 1995–04, 05–07
- Joaquín López – Salamanca – 1977–79
- Jorge López Nieva – Burgos, Sevilla – 1978–85
- Maximiliano "Maxi" López – Barcelona, Mallorca – 2004–07
- Víctor López – Real Sociedad – 2006–07
- Juan Carlos Lorenzo – Atlético Madrid – 1954–56
- Walter Lozano – Valladolid – 1989–90, 93–94
- Víctor Lucero – Castellón – 1981–82
- Dante Lugo – Atlético Madrid – 1956–58
- Ezequiel Luna – Tenerife – 2009–10
- Ricardo Lunari – Salamanca – 1998–99
- Cristian Lupidio – Salamanca – 1998–99
- Federico Lussenhoff – Tenerife, Mallorca – 1998–99, 01–04
- Germán Lux – Mallorca, Deportivo – 2007–11, 12–13, 14–17

== M ==
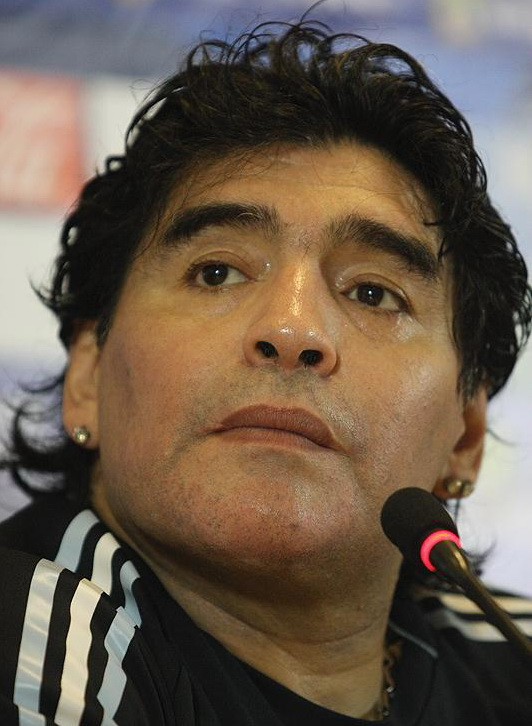
Diego Maradona in 2010

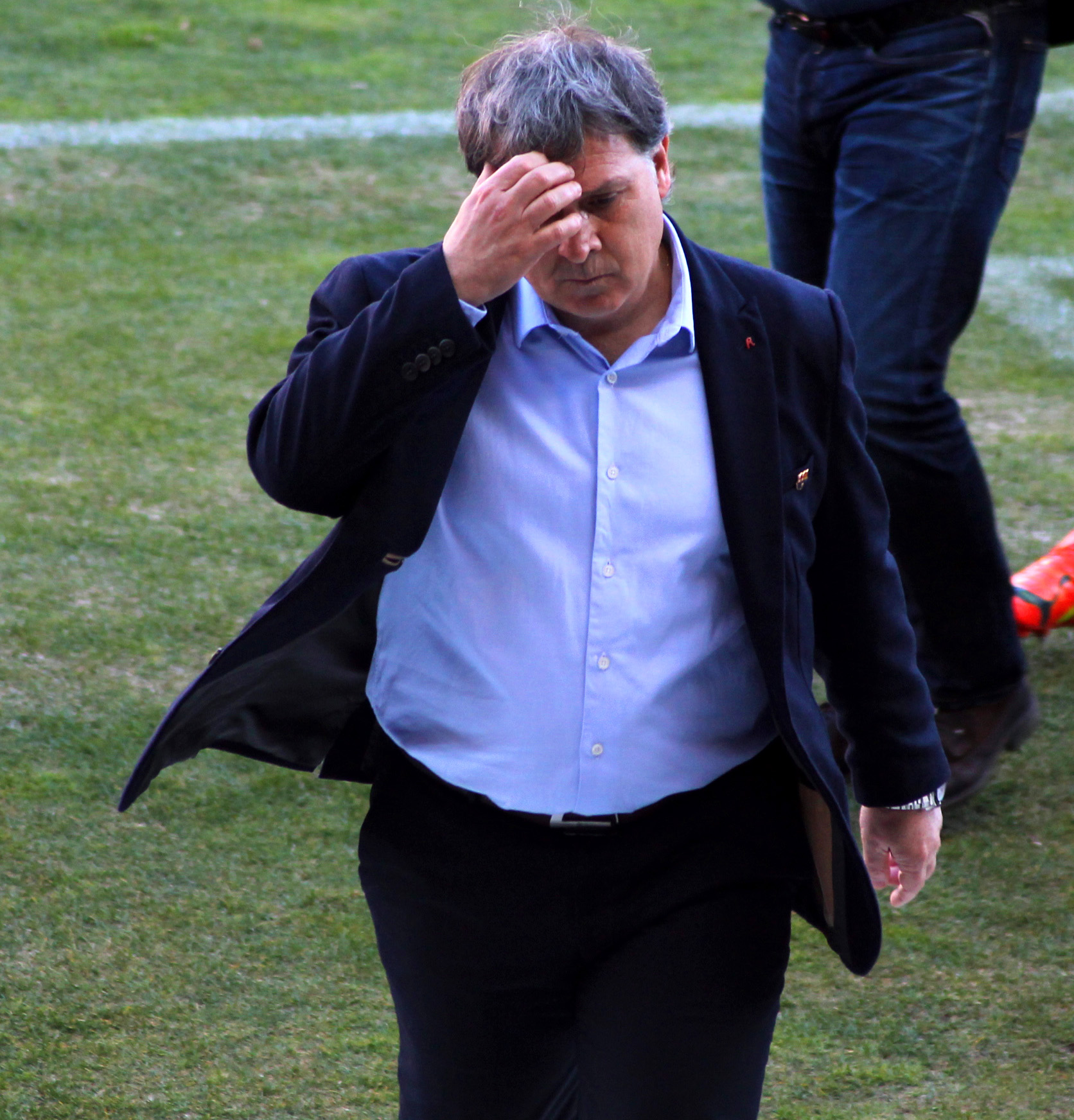
Gerardo Martino as Barcelona manager in 2014

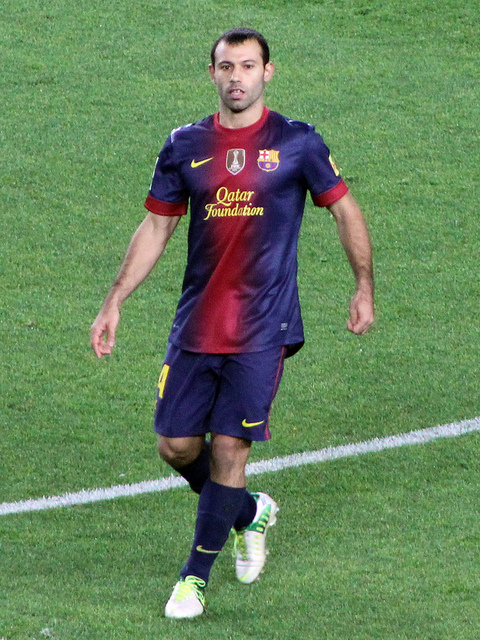
Javier Mascherano in action for Barcelona in 2012

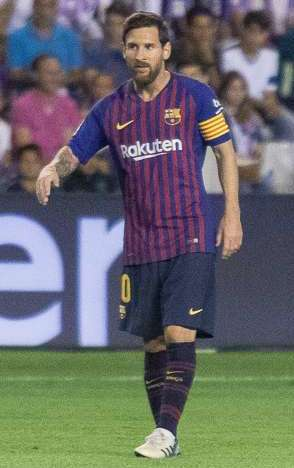
Lionel Messi playing for Barcelona in 2018

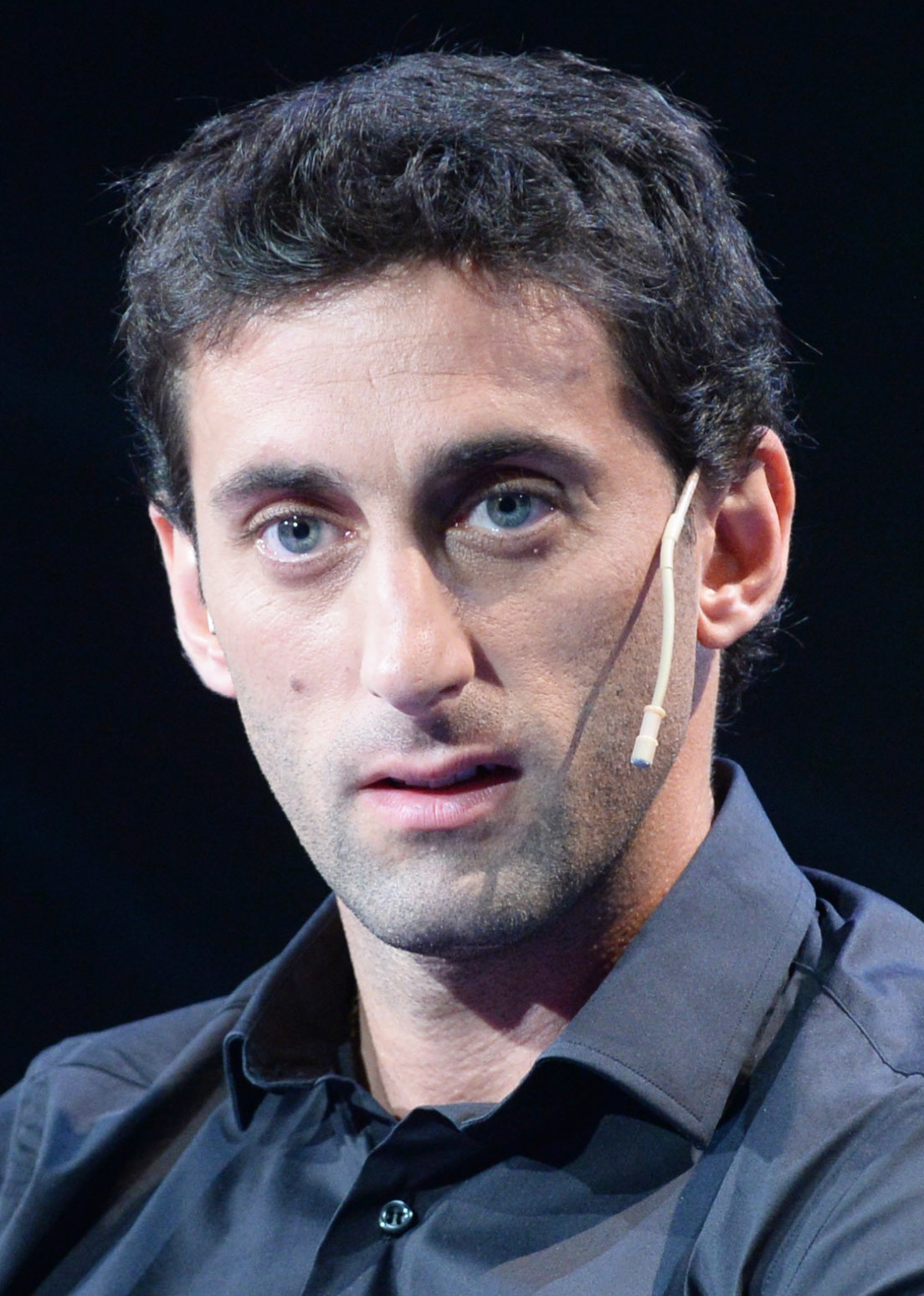
Diego Milito in 2015

- Francisco Maciel – Murcia, Mallorca – 2003–04, 05–06
- Edgardo Madinabeytia – Atlético Madrid – 1958–67
- **Pablo Maffeo** – Girona, Huesca, Mallorca, **Valencia** – 2017–18, 20–
- Lisandro Magallán – Alavés, Elche – 2019–20, 22–23
- Cristian Maidana – Recreativo – 2008–09
- Juan Carlos Mameli – Betis – 1974–75
- Martín Mandra – Rayo – 1999–00
- Martín Mantovani – Leganés, Huesca – 2016–18, 18–19
- Diego Maradona – Barcelona, Sevilla – 1982–84, 92–93
- Hugo Maradona – Rayo – 1989–90
- Agustín Marchesín – Celta – 2022–23
- Iván Marcone – Elche – 2020–22
- Claudio Marini – Numancia – 2000–01
- Bruno Marioni – Villarreal, Tenerife – 2000–02
- Armando Martín – Zaragoza – 1967–71
- Emiliano Martínez – Getafe – 2017–18
- Jorge Martínez – Zaragoza – 1999–00
- Ricardo Martínez – Almería – 1979–81
- Román Martínez – Espanyol, Tenerife – 2008–10
- Miguel Martino – Oviedo – 1949–50
- Gerardo Martino – Tenerife – 1990–91
- Alejandro Martinuccio – Villarreal – 2011–12
- Óscar Mas – Real Madrid – 1973–74
- Javier Mascherano – Barcelona – 2010–18
- Eduardo Massey – Oviedo – 1958–59
- Franco Mastantuono – Real Madrid – 2025–26
- Aníbal Matellán – Getafe, Gimnàstic – 2005–07
- Diego Mateo – Racing – 2002–05
- Marcos Mauro – Cádiz – 2020–22
- Javier Mazzoni – Racing – 2000–01
- Carlos Medrano – Barcelona – 1959–60
- Óscar Mena – Mallorca, Atlético Madrid – 1997–00
- Sebastián Méndez – Celta – 2001–04, 05–06
- Gabriel Mercado – Sevilla – 2016–19
- Lionel Messi – Barcelona – 2004–21
- Diego Milito – Zaragoza – 2005–08
- Gabriel Milito – Zaragoza, Barcelona – 2003–11
- Hugo Módigo – Sevilla – 1977–78
- Nahuel Molina – Atlético Madrid – 2022–26
- Daniel Montenegro – Zaragoza, Osasuna – 2000–02
- Gonzalo Montiel – Sevilla – 2021–23, 24–25
- Walter Montoya – Sevilla – 2016–18
- Luciano Fabián Monzón – Betis – 2008–09
- Hugo Morales – Tenerife – 2001–02
- Ángel "Matute" Morales – Mérida – 1997–98
- Pedro Morant – Hércules – 1996–97
- Matías Moreno – Levante – 2025–26
- Carlos Morete – Las Palmas, Sevilla – 1975–81
- Guillermo Morigi – Valencia – 1997–98
- Horacio Moyano – Hércules, Betis, Murcia, Celta – 1977–82, 83–88
- Ezequiel Muñoz – Leganés – 2017–19
- Javier Muñoz – Tenerife, Valladolid – 2001–03
- Daniel Murúa – Sevilla – 1979–82
- Mateo Musacchio – Villarreal – 2009–12, 13–17
- **Juan Musso** – **Atlético Madrid** – 2024–
- Damián Musto – Huesca – 2018–19

== N ==
- Ariel Nahuelpán – Racing – 2010–12
- José Navarro – Real Madrid – 1947–49
- Mauro Navas – Espanyol – 1999–03
- Sebastián Nayar – Recreativo – 2008–09
- Juan Neira – Valladolid – 2012–13
- Mateu Nicolau – Barcelona – 1948–52
- Félix Nieto – Málaga – 1979–80

== O ==
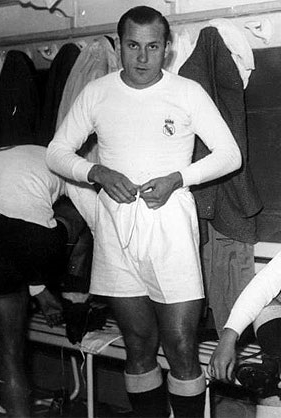
Roque Olsen in 1955

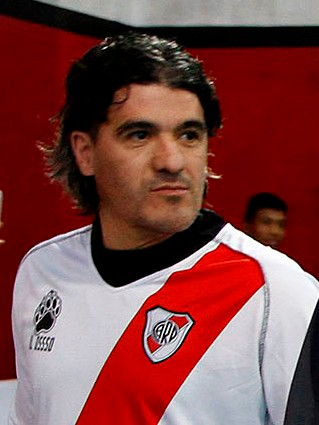
Ariel Ortega in 2013

- Lucas Ocampos – Sevilla – 2019–22, 22–25
- Marcelo Ojeda – Tenerife – 1994–98
- Pedro Ojeda – Numancia – 1999–01
- Roque Olsen – Real Madrid – 1950–57
- Lucas Orbán – Valencia, Levante – 2014–16
- Catriel Orcellet – Valladolid – 2003–04
- Roberto Orellana – Elche, Mallorca – 1976–78, 83–84
- Rodolfo Orife – Betis – 1971–73
- Ariel Ortega – Valencia – 1996–98
- Luis Oruezábal – Granada – 1973–76
- **Abiel Osorio** – **Elche** – 2026–
- Aldo Osorio – Numancia – 2004–05
- Nicolás Otamendi – Valencia – 2014–15
- Iselin Ovejero – Atlético Madrid, Zaragoza – 1969–76
- Eduardo Oviedo – Valladolid – 1982–84

== P ==
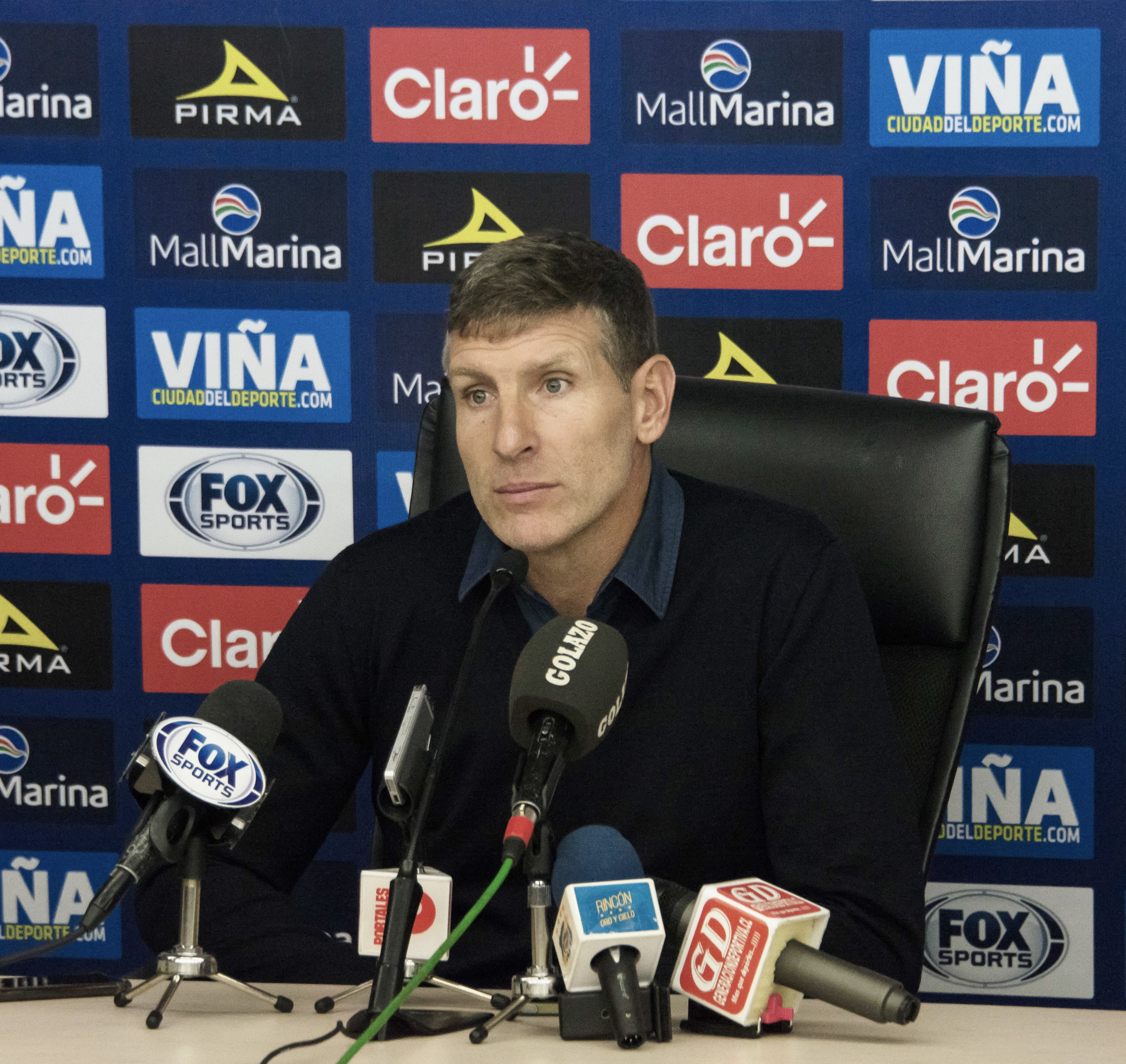
Martín Palermo in 2018

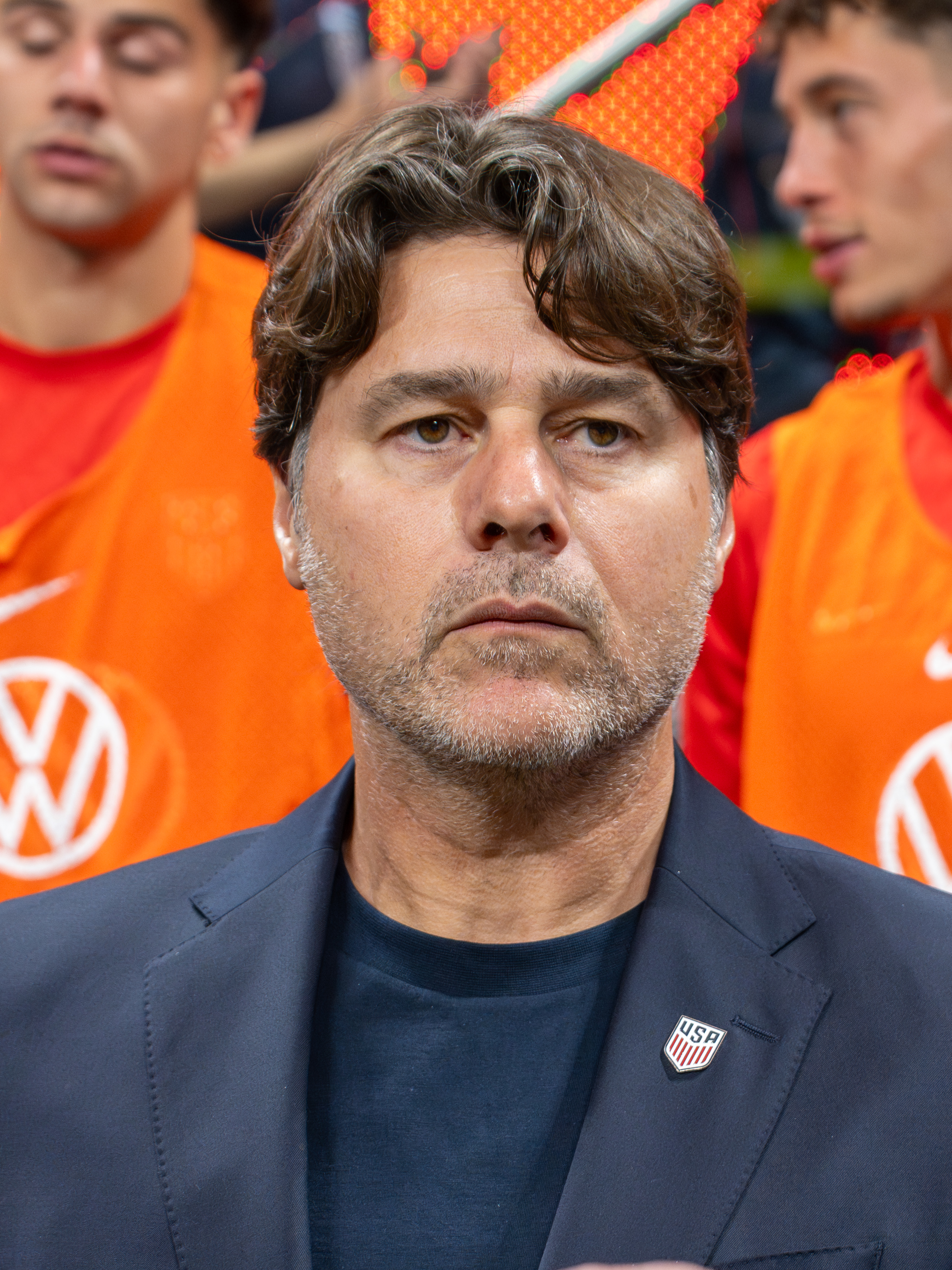
Mauricio Pochettino in 2026

- Basilio Padrón – Valencia, Las Palmas – 1955–59
- Martín Palermo – Villarreal, Betis – 2000–04
- Francisco Marqués "Pancho" – Real Sociedad – 1951–52
- Joaquín Panichelli – Alavés – 2023–24
- Nicolás Pareja – Espanyol, Sevilla – 2008–10, 13–18
- Pedro Pascual Ros – Barcelona – 1939–40
- Javier Pastore – Elche – 2021–23
- Severiano Pavón – Espanyol, Almería – 1978–80
- Mariano Pavone – Betis – 2007–09
- Matías Pavoni – Cádiz – 2005–06
- Nico Paz – Real Madrid – 2023–24
- Pablo Paz – Tenerife, Valladolid – 1996–99, 01–02, 03–04
- Emilio Pazos – Sevilla, Granada, Murcia – 1967–68, 69–72, 73–75
- Mauricio Pellegrino – Barcelona, Valencia, Alavés – 1998–05, 05–06
- José Pellejero – Granada, Racing, Elche – 1957–63
- Hernán Pellerano – Almería – 2008–11, 13–14
- Eleuterio Peña – Real Sociedad, Atlético Madrid – 1931–33, 34–36
- Gabriel Peñalba – Las Palmas – 2017–18
- Adrián Peralta – Mallorca – 2005–06
- Guillermo Pereyra – Mallorca – 2003–08
- Enzo Pérez – Valencia – 2014–17
- Hugo Pérez – Sporting – 1994–97
- Miguel Pérez – Real Madrid, Zaragoza – 1967–71, 72–73
- Nehuén Pérez – Granada – 2020–21
- Pablo Pérez – Málaga – 2013–14
- Ricardo Pérez – Granada – 1957–58
- Diego Perotti – Sevilla – 2008–14
- Máximo Perrone – Las Palmas – 2023–24
- Germán Pezzella – Betis – 2015–17, 21–24
- Pablo Piatti – Almería, Valencia, Espanyol, Elche – 2008–20, 20–22
- Agustín Pastoriza "Pibe" – Betis – 2013–14
- Iván Pillud – Espanyol – 2009–10
- Héctor Pineda – Mallorca – 1998–99
- Javier Pinola – Atlético Madrid – 2003–04
- Leonardo Pisculichi – Mallorca – 2005–07
- Guido Pizarro – Sevilla – 2017–18
- Diego Placente – Celta – 2005–07
- Mauricio Pochettino – Espanyol – 1994–01, 03–06
- Roberto Pompei – Oviedo – 1997–00
- **Ezequiel Ponce** – Granada, **Elche** – 2016–17, 21–23, 26–
- Rafael Ponce – Deportivo – 1948–51
- Leonardo Ponzio – Zaragoza – 2003–07, 09–12
- Martín Posse – Espanyol – 1998–03, 04–06
- Carlos Próugenes – Mallorca – 1969–70
- Nery Pumpido – Betis – 1988–89

== Q ==
- Daniel Quevedo – Málaga – 1976–77
- Diego Quintana – Murcia – 2003–04
- Jorge Quinteros – Mallorca – 1999–00

== R ==
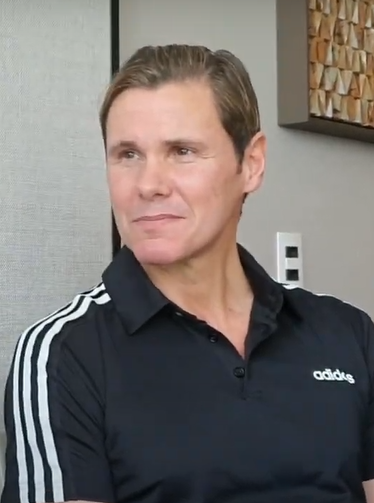
Fernando Redondo in 2019

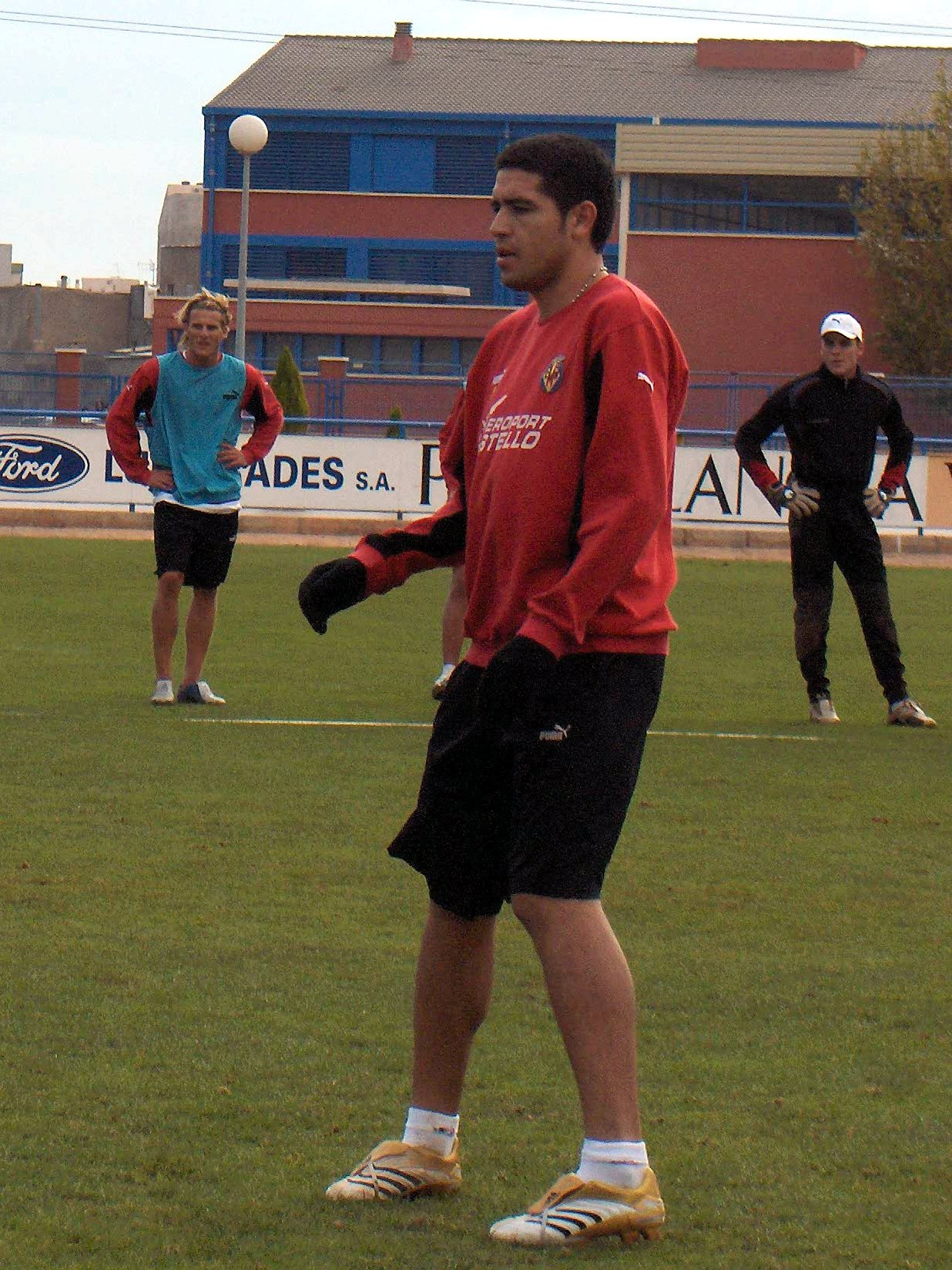
Juan Román Riquelme training with Villarreal in 2005

- Sebastián Rambert – Zaragoza – 1995–96
- **Federico Redondo** – **Elche** – 2025–
- Fernando Redondo – Tenerife, Real Madrid – 1990–00
- Óscar Regenhardt – Málaga – 1982–85
- Gustavo Reggi – Levante – 2004–05, 06–07
- Ezequiel Rescaldani – Málaga – 2013–15
- Ricardo Rezza – Salamanca, Sporting – 1974–80
- Pablo Richetti – Valladolid – 2000–04
- Emiliano Rigoni – Elche – 2020–21
- Jorge Rinaldi – Sporting – 1985–86
- Juan Román Riquelme – Barcelona, Villarreal – 2002–07
- Gerardo Rivero – Osasuna – 2001–04
- Carlos Roa – Mallorca, Albacete – 1997–99, 00–02, 03–04
- Lucas Robertone – Almería – 2022–24
- Manuel Rocha – Real Madrid – 1947–48
- Roberto Roche – Elche – 1959–60
- Adalberto Rodríguez – Jaén, Atlético Madrid – 1957–59
- **Adrián Rodríguez** – **Alavés** – 2024–25, 26–
- Clemente Rodríguez – Espanyol – 2007–08
- Fernando Rodríguez – Málaga, Elche – 1982–84, 88–89
- Gonzalo Rodríguez – Villarreal – 2004–12
- **Guido Rodríguez** – Betis, **Valencia** – 2019–24, 25–
- Maxi Rodríguez – Espanyol, Atlético Madrid – 2002–10
- Osvaldo Rodríguez – Racing – 1981–82
- José Luis "Puma" Rodríguez – Betis – 1988–89, 90–91
- Alfredo Rojas – Celta, Betis – 1958–61
- Esteban Rolón – Málaga – 2017–18
- Bernardo Romeo – Mallorca, Osasuna – 2004–07
- **Cristian Romero** – **Atlético Madrid** – 2026–
- Luka Romero – Mallorca, Almería, Alavés – 2019–20, 23–25
- Sebastián Ariel Romero – Betis – 1999–00
- **Zaid Romero** – **Getafe** – 2025–
- Facundo Roncaglia – Espanyol, Celta, Valencia, Osasuna – 2009–10, 16–21
- Pablo Rotchen – Espanyol – 1999–02
- Marco Rubén – Recreativo, Villarreal – 2007–12
- Luis Rueda – Extremadura – 1998–99
- Oscar Ruggeri – Logroñés, Real Madrid – 1988–90
- Gerónimo Rulli – Real Sociedad, Villarreal – 2014–19, 20–23
- Franco Russo – Mallorca – 2021–23

== S ==
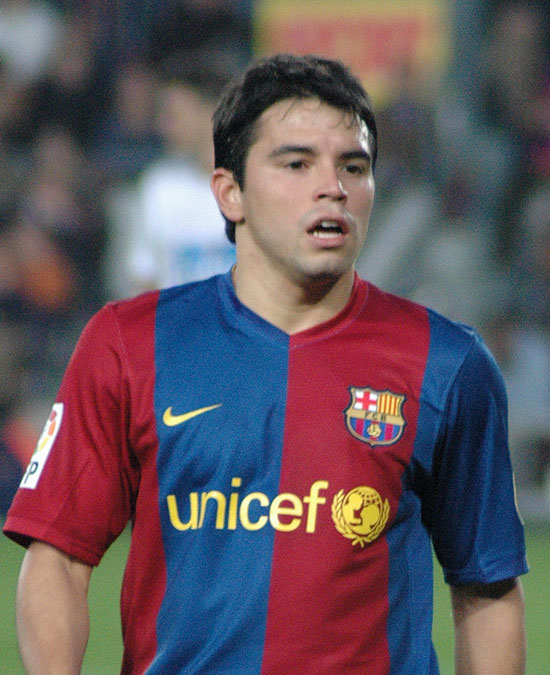
Javier Saviola playing for Barcelona in 2007

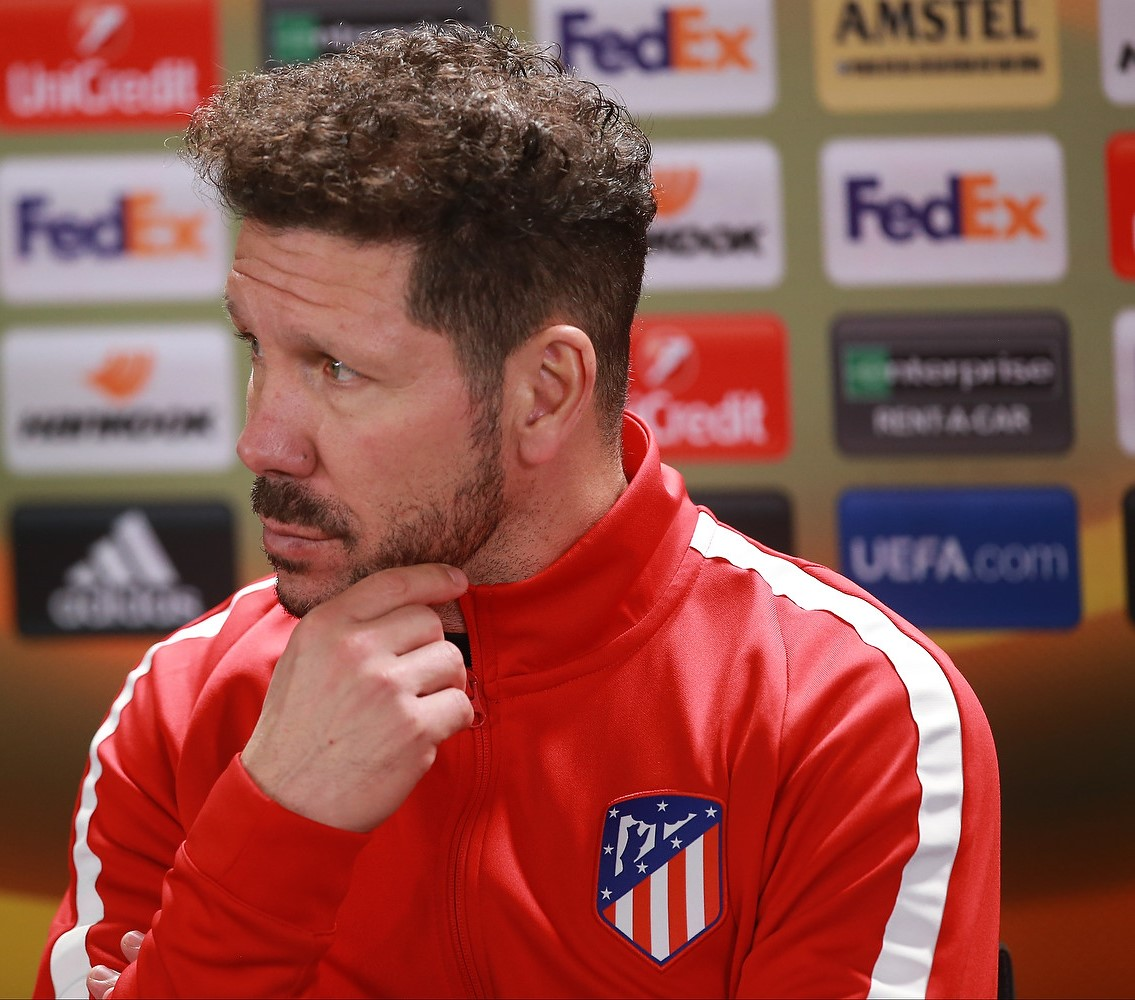
Diego Simeone as Atlético Madrid manager in 2018

- Gerónimo Saccardi – Hércules – 1975–79
- Fernando Salgado – Las Palmas – 1958–59
- Eduardo Salvio – Atlético Madrid – 2009–10, 11–12
- Walter Samuel – Real Madrid – 2004–05
- Dante Sanabria – Hércules, Sevilla – 1984–87
- José María Sánchez Lage – Oviedo, Valencia, Deportivo – 1958–67
- Juan Sánchez Miño – Elche – 2020–21
- Manuel Sánchez – Oviedo – 1958–59
- Pablo "Vitamina" Sánchez – Alavés – 1998–99
- José Sand – Deportivo – 2010–11
- Evaristo Sande – Oviedo, Málaga, Granada – 1958–60, 62–63, 66–67
- Gastón Sangoy – Sporting – 2010–12
- Miguel Ángel Santoro – Hércules – 1974–77
- Benjamín Santos – Deportivo – 1956–57
- Guillermo Sara – Betis – 2013–14
- Pedro Sará – Oviedo, Murcia, Jaén – 1949–50, 52–54, 55–56, 57–58
- Renzo Saravia – Valencia – 2025–26
- Juan Sarrachini – Mallorca – 1969–70
- Javier Saviola – Barcelona, Sevilla, Real Madrid, Málaga – 2001–04, 05–09, 12–13
- Lionel Scaloni – Deportivo, Racing, Mallorca – 1997–06, 06–07, 07–09
- Gabriel Schürrer – Racing, Deportivo, Las Palmas, Real Sociedad – 1996–04
- Héctor Scotta – Sevilla – 1976–80
- Darío Scotto – Sporting – 1992–93
- Juan Serrizuela – Mallorca – 1999–00
- Jonathan Silva – Leganés, Getafe – 2018–20, 21–22
- Walter Silvani – Extremadura, Salamanca – 1996–99
- Diego Simeone – Sevilla, Atlético Madrid – 1992–97, 03–05
- **Giuliano Simeone** – **Atlético Madrid**, Alavés – 2021–22, 23–
- Gustavo Siviero – Mallorca, Albacete – 1998–02, 03–05
- Augusto Solari – Celta – 2020–23
- Esteban Solari – Almería – 2008–10
- Santiago Solari – Atlético Madrid, Real Madrid – 1998–05
- Juan Solé – Valladolid, Oviedo, Murcia – 1959–61, 62–64
- Leandro Somoza – Villarreal, Betis – 2006–08
- Juan Pablo Sorín – Barcelona, Villarreal – 2002–03, 04–06
- José Sosa – Atlético Madrid – 2013–14
- Juan Sotelo – Murcia – 1980–81
- Adolfo Soto – Las Palmas, Zaragoza – 1971–75
- Ernesto Suárez – Espanyol – 1973–74
- Leonardo Suárez – Villarreal, Valladolid – 2016–19
- Alexander Szymanowski – Leganés – 2016–19

== T ==
- Juan Taverna – Murcia – 1973–74
- **Nahuel Tenaglia** – **Alavés** – 2021–22, 23–
- Fernando Tissone – Mallorca, Málaga – 2011–12, 12–16
- Mariano Toedtli – Sevilla – 2001–03
- Hernán Toledo – Las Palmas – 2017–18
- Marco Torsiglieri – Almería – 2013–14
- Óscar Trejo – Mallorca, Sporting, Rayo – 2006–09, 11–12, 18–19, 21–26
- Marcelo Trobbiani – Elche, Zaragoza – 1976–78, 80–81
- Roberto Trotta – Sporting – 1997–98
- Mario Turdó – Celta, Las Palmas – 1999–01
- Eduardo Tuzzio – Mallorca – 2005–06

== U ==
- Leonardo Ulloa – Almería – 2010–11
- Juan Urruti – Valencia – 1983–86
- Óscar Ustari – Getafe – 2007–11

== V ==
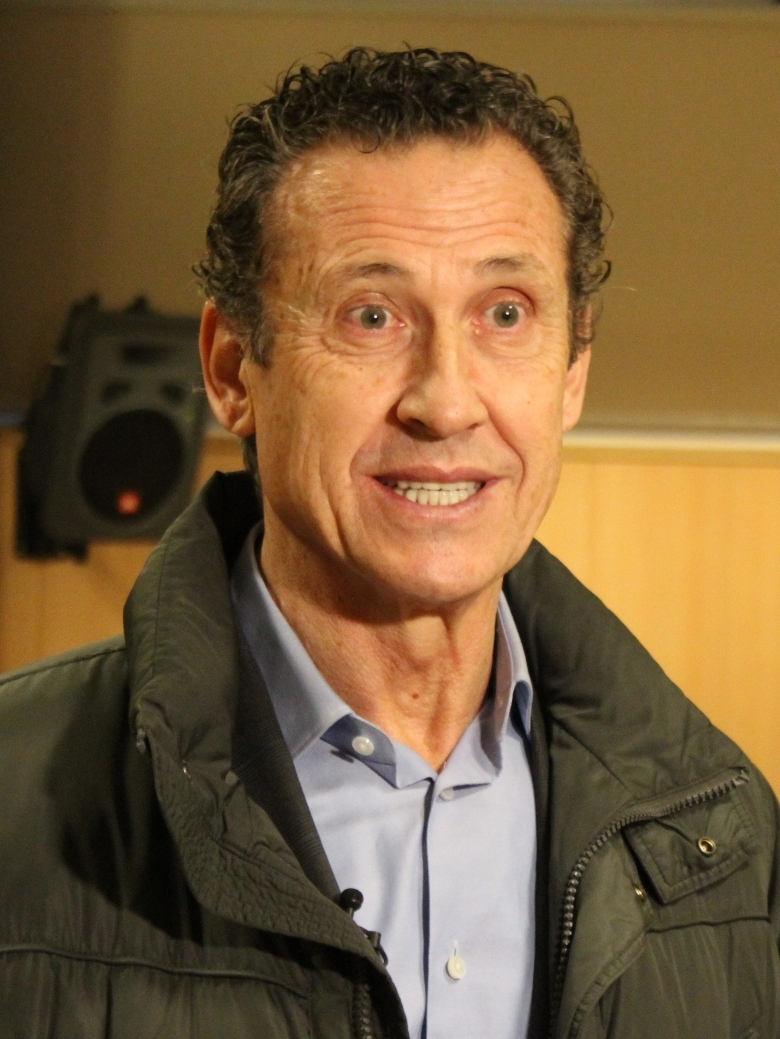
Jorge Valdano in 2018

- Hugo Vaca – Cádiz – 1981–82
- Jorge Valdano – Zaragoza, Real Madrid – 1979–87
- José Valdiviezo – Atlético Madrid – 1947–49
- **Nicolás Valentini** – **Alavés** – 2026–
- Diego Valeri – Almería – 2010–11
- José Valle – Lleida – 1950–51
- Matías Vargas – Espanyol – 2019–20
- Fabián Vázquez – Cádiz – 1990–92
- Franco Vázquez – Rayo, Sevilla – 2012–13, 16–21
- Luis Vázquez – Getafe – 2025–26
- Alejo Véliz – Sevilla, Espanyol – 2023–25
- Luciano Vella – Cádiz – 2005–06
- Pedro Verde – Las Palmas, Hércules – 1973–74, 75–79
- Santiago Vergini – Getafe – 2015–16
- Juan Carlos Verón – Racing, Mallorca – 1981–84
- Sebastián Viberti – Málaga – 1970–74
- Luciano Vietto – Villarreal, Atlético Madrid, Sevilla, Valencia – 2014–18
- José Vigo – Celta – 1957–58
- Rodolfo Vilanova – Málaga – 1970–75, 76–77
- Guillermo Villagrá – Arenas, Valencia – 1931–36
- José Villarreal – Atlético Madrid – 1992–93
- Francisco Villegas – Sevilla – 1942–43
- Martín Vitali – Getafe – 2004–05
- Nelson Vivas – Celta – 1999–00
- Antonio Vucetich – Espanyol – 1948–49

== W ==
- Axel Werner – Atlético Madrid, Huesca, Elche – 2017–19, 22–23
- Lucas Wilchez – Zaragoza – 2012–13
- Enrique Wolff – Las Palmas, Real Madrid – 1974–79

== Z ==
- Pablo Zabaleta – Espanyol – 2005–08
- Julio Zamora – Sabadell – 1987–88
- Víctor Zapata – Valladolid – 2003–04
- Ariel Zárate – Málaga – 1999–02
- Rolando Zárate – Real Madrid – 1999–00
- Bruno Zuculini – Valencia, Córdoba – 2014–15
- Franco Zuculini – Zaragoza – 2011–13
- Rafael Zuviría – Racing, Barcelona, Mallorca – 1973–74, 75–82, 83–84

== See also ==
- List of foreign La Liga players
- List of Argentine footballers in Serie A

== Notes ==
1. Born in France
2. Born in Italy
3. Born in Spain
4. Capped for the Catalonia national football team
5. Capped for the Colombia national football team
6. Capped for the Spain national football team
7. Capped for the Spain national under-21 football team
8. Capped for the Spain national under-19 football team
9. Capped for the Spain national under-17 football team
10. Capped for the Spain national under-16 football team
11. Capped for the Italy national football team

== Sources ==
- Foreign Players in the Spanish League (First Division) by RSSSF
- Histórico de Primera División by BDFutbol
