= Vicente Borge =

Spanish footballer and manager

Personal information
- Full name: Vicente Borge González
- Date of birth: 23 October 1968 (age 58)
- Place of birth: Mieres, Spain
- Height: 1.84 m (6 ft 0 in)
- Position: Striker

Youth career
- 1985–1987: Caudal

Senior career*
Years	Team	Apps	(Gls)
1986	Caudal	1	(0)
1987–1990	Oviedo B	62	(22)
1988	Oviedo	3	(0)
1988–1989	→ Burgos (loan)	5	(0)
1990–1991	Lalín	40	(23)
1991	Cultural Leonesa	11	(3)
1991–1992	Avilés	20	(8)
1992–1993	Sabadell	37	(12)
1993–1994	Mérida	6	(0)
1994–1995	Lugo	31	(16)
1995–1996	Racing Ferrol	35	(10)
1996–1998	Lugo	61	(37)
1998–2000	Cádiz	61	(20)
2000–2001	Novelda	35	(12)
2001–2003	Hércules	62	(21)
2003–2006	Villajoyosa	89	(27)
Total		559	(211)

Managerial career
- 2006–2008: Villajoyosa
- 2009: Benidorm
- 2009–2011: Alicante
- 2011–2013: Hércules B
- * Club domestic league appearances and goals

Vicente Borge González (born 23 October 1968) is a Spanish retired footballer who played as a striker, and a manager.

== Playing career ==
Born in Mieres, Asturias, Borge was a leading scorer in several of the clubs he played for, notably netting 22 Segunda División B goals for CD Lugo in 1997–98 and also scoring regularly with Cádiz CF and Novelda CF. In Segunda División he played for Real Oviedo, Real Burgos CF, Real Avilés, CE Sabadell FC and CP Mérida, amassing totals of 71 games and 20 goals over the course of five seasons and being relegated with the third and fourth teams.

Borge closed out his career at nearly 38 after several years in the third level and the Valencian Community, with Novelda, Hércules CF and Villajoyosa CF. In the 2001–02 campaign, whilst with Hércules, he finished second in Group III's scoring charts at 14, behind joint-winners Luis García and Javier Portillo (both of Real Madrid Castilla) and UD Lanzarote's Jonathan Torres, all with 15.

== Coaching career ==
After hanging up his boots in June 2006 Borge decided to start a managerial career, precisely with his last club Villajoyosa, being relegated from division three in his second season. After a brief spell with Benidorm he signed for yet another Valencian club in the third tier, Alicante CF, meeting exactly the same fate in 2011 but now due to financial irregularities.

In July 2011 Borge returned to Hércules, being appointed at the reserve side due to the good project of the club's sporting director, Sergio Fernández.

== Managerial statistics ==
As of 20 June 2015

Managerial record by team and tenure
Team	Nat	From	To	Record							
Team	Nat	From	To	G	W	D	L	GF	GA	GD	Win %
Villajoyosa	(Spain)	30 June 2006	1 July 2008	79	25	25	29	71	81	−10	31.65
Benidorm	(Spain)	22 March 2009	30 June 2009	8	2	2	4	7	8	−1	25.00
Alicante	(Spain)	1 July 2009	30 June 2011	79	23	32	24	82	79	+3	29.11
Hércules B	(Spain)	8 July 2011	30 June 2013	72	37	12	23	118	81	+37	51.39
Career total				238	87	71	80	278	249	+29	36.55
