= Milan Maričić =

Croatian footballer and manager

Personal information
- Full name: Milan Maričić
- Date of birth: 12 October 1961 (age 65)
- Place of birth: Vinkovci, SR Croatia, SFR Yugoslavia
- Position: Defender

Senior career*
Years	Team	Apps	(Gls)
1980–1991	Osijek	215	(8)
1991–1992	Rad Beograd	16	(2)
1992–1994	Panachaiki	60	(2)
Total		291	(12)

Managerial career
- Panachaiki (assistant)
- 2002: Patraikos (youth)
- * Club domestic league appearances and goals

Milan Maričić (born 12 October 1961) is a Croatian football manager and former player.

== Club career ==
Born in Vinkovci, SR Croatia, back then within Yugoslavia, Maričić played for over a decade with NK Osijek in the Yugoslav First League. He Osijek's captain during the last five seasons, and in 1991 he moved to Belgrade and signed with Serbian club FK Rad. He played with Rad in the 1991–92 Yugoslav First League. Then he moved to Greece where he played four years with Panachaiki F.C. in Super League Greece and then retired and became assistant manager in same club. He then by summer 2002 was working as coach of the youth teams of Patraikos.

== Personal life ==
His wife, Slobodanka "Boba" Čolović was an athlete and they have lived for ten years on the Greek island of Corfu.
