= Josip Višnjić =

Serbian retired footballer (born 1966)

Personal information
- Full name: Josip Višnjić
- Date of birth: 17 November 1966 (age 60)
- Place of birth: Belgrade, SR Serbia, SFR Yugoslavia
- Height: 1.83 m (6 ft 0 in)
- Position: Midfielder

Senior career*
Years	Team	Apps	(Gls)
1987–1990	Radnički Niš	71	(19)
1990–1991	Partizan	35	(10)
1991–1992	Mérida	37	(4)
1992–1995	Rayo Vallecano	99	(7)
1995–2000	Hércules	111	(3)
Total		353	(43)

Managerial career
- 2001–2002: Hércules (youth)
- 2002–2003: Hércules B
- 2003: Hércules
- 2004–2005: Alcalá
- 2005–2006: Las Palmas
- 2006–2007: Granada
- 2008–2009: Alcalá
- 2009–2010: Logroñés
- 2011–2012: Alcalá
- 2012–2013: Hércules (youth)
- 2013–2014: Fuenlabrada
- 2014–2015: Toledo
- 2016: Fuenlabrada
- 2018: Hércules
- 2022: Villanovense
- 2023–2024: Hércules B
- 2024: Jove Español
- * Club domestic league appearances and goals

Josip Višnjić (Cyrillic: Јосип Вишњић; born 17 November 1966) is a Serbian retired footballer who played as a defensive midfielder, and a coach.

After starting out at Radnički Niš, he went on to spend the vast majority of his career in Spain, as both a player and manager. In La Liga, he represented Rayo Vallecano and Hércules.

== Playing career ==
In his country, Belgrade-born Višnjić played for FK Radnički Niš and FK Partizan. At nearly 25 he moved abroad, going on to spend the remaining years of his career in Spain, with three clubs: he started out with CP Mérida in the second division, then achieved both one promotion and relegation from La Liga with Madrid's Rayo Vallecano.

In 1995, Višnjić signed with Hércules CF in Alicante, playing 30 matches in his first season which ended in top flight promotion, followed by immediate relegation. After the club's demotion into the third level in 1999, the 32-year-old retired one year later, having appeared in 88 games in the Spanish top division (238 with both major levels accounted for).

== Coaching career ==
Višnjić started coaching one year after retiring, starting with the reserves of his last club (he also briefly managed the first team) and working mainly in Spain, never in higher than division three. In the 2004–05 campaign, he worked with former Hércules teammate Manolo Alfaro at RSD Alcalá. Višnjić returned to manage Hércules in 2018.

== Managerial statistics ==
As of match played 30 November 2024

Managerial record by team and tenure
Team	From	To	Record								Ref
Team	From	To	G	W	D	L	GF	GA	GD	Win %	Ref
Hércules B	1 July 2002	17 March 2003	25	18	4	3	55	23	+32	72.00	
Hércules	17 March 2003	30 June 2003	10	3	4	3	14	15	−1	30.00	
Alcalá	1 July 2004	30 June 2005	42	18	14	10	42	33	+9	42.86	
Las Palmas	1 July 2005	20 March 2006	32	14	12	6	37	22	+15	43.75	
Granada	1 July 2006	29 January 2007	26	9	7	10	28	25	+3	34.62	
Alcalá	1 July 2008	30 June 2009	46	29	10	7	75	28	+47	63.04	
Logroñés	1 July 2009	25 October 2010	56	19	20	17	59	51	+8	33.93	
Alcalá	28 September 2011	30 June 2012	32	9	14	9	32	34	−2	28.13	
Fuenlabrada	6 July 2013	30 June 2014	39	17	14	8	52	39	+13	43.59	
Toledo	1 July 2014	30 June 2015	41	17	9	15	50	58	−8	41.46	
Fuenlabrada	21 February 2016	24 October 2016	22	8	6	8	28	30	−2	36.36	
Hércules	13 February 2018	17 May 2018	13	4	5	4	13	9	+4	30.77	
Villanovense	15 March 2022	27 June 2022	9	3	3	3	10	9	+1	33.33	
Hércules B	14 February 2023	30 June 2024	40	12	12	16	52	53	−1	30.00	
Jove Español	9 July 2024	30 November 2024	12	3	3	6	11	19	−8	25.00	
Career total			445	183	137	125	558	448	+110	41.12	—

== Notes ==
1. His first name has also been spelled as Josif (Cyrillic: Јосиф).
