= José Francisco Mañuz =

Spanish football player

Personal information
- Full name: José Francisco Mañuz Trigueros
- Date of birth: 29 December 1960 (age 65)
- Place of birth: Alicante, Spain
- Height: 1.84 m (6 ft 0 in)
- Position: Centre back

Youth career
- Colegio Inmaculada Alicante
- 1975–1980: Hércules

Senior career*
Years	Team	Apps	(Gls)
1980–1985	Hércules	93	(0)
1978–1979	→ Español San Vicente (loan)		
1979–1980	→ Orihuela Deportiva (loan)		
1985–1986	Deportivo La Coruña	15	(0)
1986–1987	Ceuta		
1987–1988	Gandía		
1988–1990	Alcoyano		
1990–1994	Villajoyosa		

International career
1978–1979	Spain U18	5	(1)

Managerial career
- 1994: Villajoyosa
- * Club domestic league appearances and goals

José Francisco Mañuz Trigueros (born 29 December 1960) is a Spanish retired footballer who played as a central defender.

== Football career ==
Born in Alicante, Valencian Community, Mañuz spent several seasons with local Hércules CF, making his senior debuts with lowly FC Jove Español San Vicente at the age of 17, which earned him a call-up to the Spain under-18 team. With Hércules he played five campaigns at the professional level, three in La Liga and two in the second division: his best output occurred in 1984–85 when he started in all of his 24 top flight appearances to help the club finish 15th, being the first team above the relegation zone.

From 1985 until his retirement nine years later, Mañuz competed almost exclusively in the lower leagues, the sole exception being with Deportivo de La Coruña. After finishing his career with Villajoyosa CF he had a very brief spell as manager, precisely with his last side.
