= Charles (footballer, born 1954) =

Argentine footballer

Personal information
- Full name: Alfonso Adolfo José Troisi Couto
- Date of birth: January 21, 1954 (age 72)
- Place of birth: Buenos Aires, Argentina
- Height: 1.74 m (5 ft 9 in)
- Position: Striker

Senior career*
Years	Team	Apps	(Gls)
1973–1974	Chacarita Juniors	3	(0)
1974–1975	Marseille	9	(1)
1975–1976	Montpellier	4	(3)
1976–1980	Hércules CF	99	(13)
1980–1981	AD Almería	21	(3)
1981–1983	Córdoba CF		

Managerial career
- Algueña
- Monforte
- Xixona
- 1996–1998: Hércules B
- 1998–1999: Español San Vicente
- 1999–2000: Villena
- 2008–2009: Hércules B
- * Club domestic league appearances and goals

Alfonso Adolfo José Troisi Couto (born January 21, 1954), nicknamed Charles, is an Argentine former football striker.

== Playing career ==
Troisi started his professional playing career in 1973 with Chacarita Juniors.

He quickly moved to Europe, first playing in France for Olympique de Marseille and Montpellier HSC, before joining Spain where he played for Hércules CF, AD Almería and Córdoba CF.

== Honours ==
Season	Club	Title
1974–1975	Olympique de Marseille	Ligue 1 runner-up
