= Mario Finarolli =

Argentinian association football player

Personal information
- Full name: Mario Roberto Finarolli
- Date of birth: January 31, 1953 (age 73)
- Place of birth: Buenos Aires, Argentina

Senior career*
Years	Team	Apps	(Gls)
1971–1973	River Plate	1	(0)
1973–1975	Atlanta	43	(22)
1975–1976	Vélez Sarsfield	19	(7)
1976–1979	Elche	72	(22)
1979–1980	Argentinos Juniors	9	(1)
1980–1981	Rosario Central	12	(1)
1981–1982	Sarmiento	24	(6)
1982–1986	Temperley	108	(16)
1987	Douglas Haig		

Managerial career
- 1990–1991: Sarmiento
- 1993: Sarmiento
- 1994–1995: Tigre
- 1995–1996: Temperley
- 1996–1997: Sarmiento
- 1997–1998: Temperley
- 1999–2001: Sarmiento
- 2001–2002: Atlanta
- 2002–2003: Almirante Brown
- 2004: Temperley
- 2007: Defensores de Salto
- 2008–2009: Santamarina
- 2009–2010: Sarmiento
- 2010–2011: Nueva Chicago
- 2011–2012: Almagro
- 2013: Nueva Chicago
- 2014–2015: Almagro
- 2017: Defensores de Salto
- * Club domestic league appearances and goals

Mario Finarolli (born 31 January 1953) is an Argentine former footballer who played as a midfielder and coach.

== Career ==
Finarolli played professional football in the Argentine Primera División and Spain's La Liga. He began playing football in Club Atlético River Plate youth system, and turned professional with the club in 1971. Finarolli scored 53 goals in 216 Argentine Primera División matches with River Plate, Club Atlético Atlanta, Club Atlético Vélez Sarsfield, Argentinos Juniors, Rosario Central, Club Atlético Sarmiento and Club Atlético Temperley, He finished his career in the regional leagues with Club Atlético Douglas Haig.

After he retired from playing, Finarolli began a career as a football manager. He led Sarmineto, Tigre, Temperley, Club Almirante Brown and Club Atlético Nueva Chicago in the Primera B Nacional (second level). Finarolli lead Defensores de Salto to a historic promotion to Torneo Argentino C (the regionalized fourth level) in 2007. He returned to manage the club in 2017.
