= Carlos Rovira (footballer) =

Argentine footballer

Personal information
- Full name: Carlos María Rovira
- Date of birth: 4 November 1899
- Place of birth: Concordia, Argentina
- Date of death: unknown
- Position: Forward

Senior career*
Years	Team	Apps	(Gls)
1916–1919	Barcelona		
1919	FC Espanya		
- * Club domestic league appearances and goals

Carlos María Rovira (4 November 1899 – unknown) was an Argentine footballer who played as a forward for Barcelona in the late 1910s.

== Early life ==
Carlos María Rovira was born on 4 November 1899 Concordia, Entre Ríos, an Argentine city that borders Uruguay, being only separated by the Uruguay River.

== Playing career ==
Rovira was still a child when his family moved to Barcelona, where he joined the ranks of Barça, making his debut for the club's first team in a friendly match against Avenç de l'Sport on 4 June 1916, aged 16. He went on to play several friendlies throughout the 1916–17 season, including against Athletic Bilbao on 8 December 1916 at the San Mamés, in which he scored his side's only goal in a resounding 1–9 loss.

Rovira had to wait 18 months to finally make his official competitive debut for Barça in a Catalan championship match against Internacional on 2 December 1917, after which he was also used in the next two championship matches, against Sabadell and Espanya on 9 and 16 December. Even though he helped Barça win all three games, he never again played an official match for Barça. In doing so, he became the first Argentine footballer of Argentine parents to play for Barça, and only the second Argentine overall, after Mariano Bori (1909–1914), an exclusive group that currently also includes the likes of Mateo Nicolau, Lionel Messi, and Sergio Agüero.

In total, Rovira scored 13 goals in 41 matches for Barça between 1916 and 1919, including 3 official matches in 1917. After leaving Barça, he briefly played for Espanya before returning to Argentina in 1919.
