= Joaquín Carbonell =

Spanish writer (1947–2020)

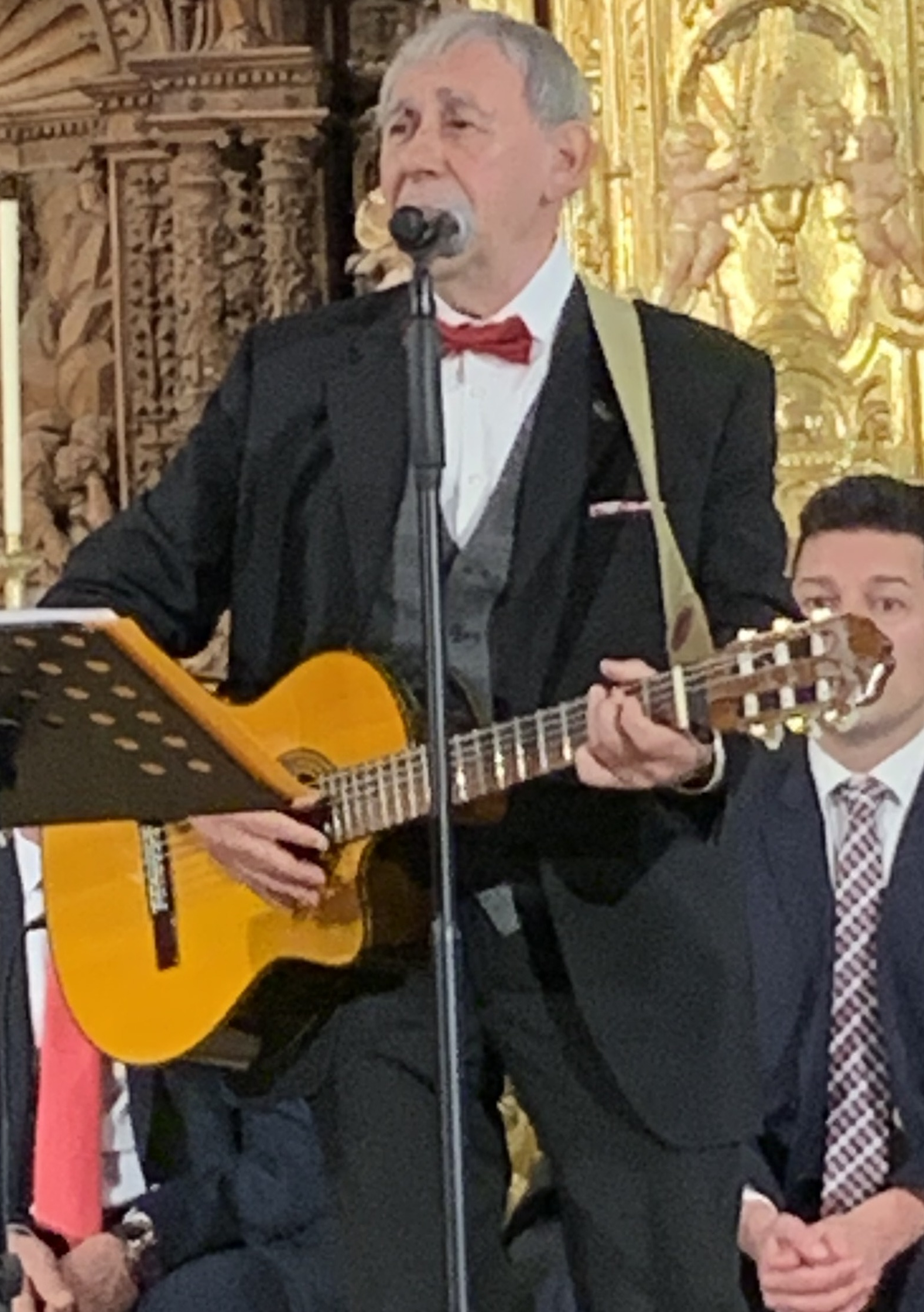
Carbonell performing in February 2020

Joaquín Carbonell Martí (12 August 1947 – 12 September 2020) was a Spanish singer-songwriter, journalist and poet.

== Biography ==
Carbonell was born in Alloza, Teruel, the son of a Republican teacher. He studied in a Salesian institute in Barcelona, but at age 15 he dropped out of school and started working in a hotel. For some years he worked as a waiter and sommelier in various resorts on the Catalan coast in summer, and in his family's oil mill in Alloza in winter; in 1967 he resumed his studies at the Ibáñez Martín Institute in Teruel, where he started writing about music.

During the 1970s, Carbonell started writing songs and was among the founders of the "new Aragonese song" movement, along with his mentor José Antonio Labordeta. He recorded more than a dozen albums as a singer-songwriter, two of which were dedicated to the figure of French singer-songwriter Georges Brassens. Carbonell also directed and presented several TVE television programs in Aragon. He also started working as a poet and narrator, as well as a journalist for El Periódico de Aragón, in which he wrote a section of interviews and television criticism under the title "Antena paranoica". As a musician, he created songs related to the Real Zaragoza football club, such as "Corazón de León", "Zaragol" and the official anthem of the club's seventy-fifth anniversary.

Carbonell often performed at the Barnasants Festival in Barcelona and in cities in France such as Pau, Toulouse, Saint Jory and Paris. He toured in three occasions to Argentina where he performed in concert halls in Buenos Aires, Rosario, La Plata as well as in Montevideo (Uruguay), Chile and Costa Rica.

On 29 September 2014, he participated in a concert in Zaragoza in tribute to José Labordeta. In the fall of 2014 Carbonell also released a double compilation album entitled 1 vida & 19 canciones. In 2017 he released a new album with unreleased songs entitled El carbón y la rosa.

Carbonell died on 12 September 2020, in Zaragoza from COVID-19 during the COVID-19 pandemic in Spain, aged 73.

== Discography ==
- Con la ayuda de todos (1976)
- Dejen pasar (1977)
- Semillas (1978)
- Sin ir más lejos (1979)
- Carbonell canta a Brassens (1996)
- Tabaco y Cariño (1998)
- Homenage a trois (2000)
- Sin móvil ni coartada (2003)
- La tos del trompestista (2005)
- Cantautores en directo. El concierto! (2007)
- Clásica y moderna (2008)
- Vayatrés! (2009), with José Antonio Labordeta and La Bullonera
- Una tarde con Labordeta (2013), with Eduardo Paz
- 1 vida & 19 canciones (2014)
- El carbón y la rosa (2017)
- Los 3 Norteamericanos. Live in Cariñena (2018)
- Carbonell 50 años (2020)

== Books ==
- Misas separadas (poems, 1987)
- Laderas del ternero (poems, 1994)
- La mejor tarde de Goyo Letrinas (novel, 1995)
- Las estrellas no beben agua del grifo (novel, 2000)
- El pastor de Andorra, 90 años de Jota (biography of José Iranzo Bielsa, 2005)
