= List of River Plate players (1–24 appearances) =

Ascanio Cortés, who made four appearances for River Plate during his career.

Club Atlético River Plate is an Argentine professional football club based in Buenos Aires, who currently play in the Argentine Primera División. The club was formed in 1901, as a result of the merging of football clubs Santa Rosa and La Rosales. River Plate won their first Primera División title in 1920; since then, the club has won a further 37 league titles, along with 16 national cups. At international level, they have been crowned champions of South American football on four occasions, winning the Copa Libertadores in 1986, 1996, 2015 and 2018, and have also won a Worldwide thropy, the 1986 Intercontinental Cup.

Since playing their first competitive match, more than 1300 players have made a competitive first-team appearance for the club. Many of these players spent only a short period of their career at River Plate before seeking opportunities with other teams. In the final years of his career, Renato Cesarini appeared 24 times for the club, winning four titles. He later assumed the role of manager, during which he led River Plate to another six trophies, coaching the squad known as La Máquina. Defender Hugo de León and forward Ricardo Gareca made 12 appearances each; De León had arrived at the club with three Copa Libertadores honours to his name, while Gareca went on to earn three consecutive runner-up medals at the competition. Francisco Sá made only two appearances for River Plate, before winning six Copa Libertadores titles following his departure.

== Players ==
- Appearances and goals are for first-team competitive matches only.
- Players are listed according to the date of their first team debut for the club.
- Positions are listed according to the tactical formations that were employed at the time. Thus, the change in the names of defensive and midfield reflects the tactical evolution that occurred from the 1960s onwards.
- Players still actively playing at River Plate are marked with †.
- Statistics correct as of 5 November 2026.

Table headers

- Nationality – If a player played international football, the country/countries he played for are shown. Otherwise, the player's nationality is given as their country of birth.
- Club career– The year of the player's first appearance for River Plate to the year of his last appearance.
- Starts – The number of games started.
- Sub – The number of games played as a substitute. Substitutions were only introduced to the Primera División in the year 1959.
- Total – The total number of games played, both as a starter and as a substitute.

Positions key
Pre-1960s		1960s–	
GK	Goalkeeper		
FB	Full back	DF	Defender
HB	Half back	MF	Midfielder
FW	Forward		
U	Utility player		

River Plate players with fewer than 25 appearances
Player	Nationality	Position	Club career	Starts	Subs	Total	Goals
Player	Nationality	Position	Club career	Appearances			Goals
Pedro Pellerano	Argentina	FB	1905–1907	20	0	20	1
Alberto Flores	Argentina	U	1905–1907	18	0	18	0
J. Reynoso	Argentina	GK	1905–1906	16	0	16	0
Damián Ceballos	Argentina	FB	1905–1906	15	0	15	0
Leopoldo Bard	Argentina	U	1905	13	0	13	0
L. Tarrico	Argentina	U	1905	13	0	13	0
Eduardo C. Rolón	Argentina	FW	1905	12	0	12	3
Pedro Moltedo	Argentina	U	1905–1906	10	0	10	0
Isidoro J. Kitzler	British India	FW	1905	6	0	6	2
Lucas Zuanich	Argentina	HB	1905	3	0	3	0
Alfredo Zanni	Argentina	GK	1905	2	0	2	0
Vicente Botteri	Argentina	U	1905	2	0	2	0
Ernesto Rolón	Argentina	FW	1905	2	0	2	0
Livio B. Ratto	Argentina	HB	1905	1	0	1	0
A. Pastoriza	Argentina	FW	1905	1	0	1	0
E. Argerich	Argentina	HB	1905	1	0	1	0
E. Brandy	Argentina	FW	1905	1	0	1	0
H. Rodger	Argentina	FW	1905	1	0	1	0
Dino Pierrotti	Argentina	HB	1906–1908	22	0	22	0
T. Vergara	Argentina	FW	1906–1907	6	0	6	1
A. Gornatti	Argentina	FW	1906	4	0	4	1
J. Campodónico	Argentina	HB	1906	3	0	3	0
Jerónimo Rossi	Argentina	FB	1906	3	0	3	0
F. Rossi	Argentina	FW	1906	2	0	2	0
Enrique Salvarezza	Argentina	GK	1906	1	0	1	0
L. Robledo	Argentina	FW	1906	1	0	1	0
J. Piccola	Argentina	HB	1906	1	0	1	0
D. López	Argentina	FB	1906	1	0	1	0
Magdalena	Argentina	FW	1906	1	0	1	0
Pascual Griffero	Argentina	FW	1907–1909	21	0	21	6
Folco Contrati	Argentina	U	1907–1910	17	0	17	1
Raúl E. Capdeville	Argentina	GK	1907–1909	17	0	17	0
Juan Ramón Peña	Argentina	FW	1907–1908	12	0	12	4
D. García	Argentina	FW	1907–1908	11	0	11	1
Francisco Díaz	Argentina	U	1907	7	0	7	0
H. Della Torre	Argentina	FW	1907–1908	6	0	6	1
Ramón Ferreiro	Argentina	HB	1907	3	0	3	0
Hauchlett	Argentina	HB	1907	1	0	1	2
Guanteirolli	Argentina	GK	1907	1	0	1	0
Vicente Oñate	Argentina	FW	1907	1	0	1	0
Julio José Abaca	Argentina	U	1908–1909	18	0	18	1
Silvio Politano	Argentina	FW	1908–1910	10	0	10	3
Mariani	Argentina	FW	1908	7	0	7	2
Brevich	Argentina	HB	1908	7	0	7	0
Ricardo Cambón	Argentina	U	1908	7	0	7	0
Miguel González	Argentina	FW	1908	6	0	6	1
A. González	Argentina	FB	1908	6	0	6	0
Levallois	Argentina	FW	1908	4	0	4	0
Arce	Argentina	FW	1908	4	0	4	0
L. Devitt	Argentina	FW	1908	4	0	4	0
J. Casella	Argentina	FW	1908	4	0	4	0
Batos	Argentina	FB	1908	1	0	1	0
Hernán E. Rodríguez	Argentina	FW	1909	21	0	21	13
Santiago Sayanes	Argentina	FW	1909	19	0	19	10
Luis Solans	Uruguay	GK	1909–1910	5	0	5	0
J. C. Díaz	Argentina	HB	1909	2	0	2	0
J. Barreiro	Argentina	GK	1909	2	0	2	0
James Soulingham	England	HB	1909	1	0	1	0
Duval	Argentina	GK	1909	1	0	1	0
J. Trami	Argentina	GK	1909	1	0	1	0
J. Velázquez	Argentina	FW	1909	1	0	1	0
Lázaro Pería	Argentina	HB	1910–1912	23	0	23	0
Ramón Lamique	Argentina	HB	1910	18	0	18	0
Antonio Martínez	Argentina	FW	1910–1916	15	0	15	2
Jorge Fernández	Argentina	FW	1910	8	0	8	3
Antonio M. Sparnocchia	Argentina	HB	1910–1916	7	0	7	0
José Filippini	Argentina	HB	1910	4	0	4	0
Fernando Cruz	Argentina	U	1910	3	0	3	0
Ángel Angotti	Argentina	U	1910	2	0	2	0
Ramón Zucchi	Argentina	FW	1910	2	0	2	0
Ernesto Palma	Argentina	U	1910–1912	2	0	2	0
A. Lanziliotti	Argentina	FW	1910	1	0	1	1
P. Meo	Argentina	FW	1910	1	0	1	0
A. Somaruga	Argentina	FW	1910	1	0	1	0
Carlos Bautista Rossi	Argentina	HB	1911–1913	20	0	20	0
Adolfo Tula	Argentina	FW	1911	9	0	9	0
Armando Filippi	Argentina	FW	1911	3	0	3	0
J. Hohmann	Argentina	HB	1911	1	0	1	0
L. E. Brohman	Argentina	FW	1911	1	0	1	0
Pascual Polimeni	Argentina	FW	1912	6	0	6	4
Juan Alessi	Argentina	GK	1912–1916	4	0	4	0
Juan Carlos Baigorria	Argentina	HB	1912	2	0	2	0
Claudio M. Leiva	Argentina	U	1912–1914	2	0	2	0
J. L. Méndez	Argentina	FB	1912	1	0	1	0
Zoltán Papp de Nemesker	Hungary	HB	1912	1	0	1	0
E. Stewart	Argentina	FW	1912	1	0	1	0
Fernando Roldán	Argentina	HB	1913; 1919–1920	23	0	23	6
Alfredo Di Stéfano	Argentina	FW	1913–1915	5	0	5	4
Antonio Airoldi	Argentina	HB	1913–1915	3	0	3	0
Arthur Herbert Thompson	England	U	1913–1914	3	0	3	0
Ricardo Pensa	Argentina	FW	1913–1915	3	0	3	0
J. Broggi	Argentina	FW	1913	2	0	2	0
Zoilo Canaveri	Uruguay	FW	1913	1	0	1	1
Elías Consiglieri	Argentina	FW	1913	1	0	1	0
Alfredo Martín	Argentina	FW	1914–1917	21	0	21	8
Alfredo Elli	Argentina	HB	1914–1915	21	0	21	0
Juan Bautista Gianetto	Argentina	FW	1914–1915	18	0	18	5
Pablo Cipresini	Argentina	FW	1914–1918	7	0	7	1
Angel Juan Sevesi	Argentina	FW	1914–1915	6	0	6	0
A. Trillo	Argentina	HB	1914	1	0	1	0
Héctor Rivas	Argentina	FW	1915–1920	21	0	21	3
Manuel Fraga	Argentina	FW	1915	15	0	15	1
Adolfo D’Espósito	Argentina	GK	1915	1	0	1	0
Santiago Mantero	Argentina	FW	1916–1920	9	0	9	2
Alfredo Dolhagaray	Argentina	FW	1916	6	0	6	0
Martín Ortelli	Argentina	HB	1916	5	0	5	0
Aníbal C. Ballesteros	Argentina	FW	1916	2	0	2	0
Juan Emilio Rolandi	Argentina	FW	1916	1	0	1	0
A. Antieri	Argentina	FW	1916	1	0	1	0
J. Palma	Argentina	HB	1916	1	0	1	0
Lino Beltrán	Argentina	FB	1916	1	0	1	0
Rafael A. Pertini	Argentina	FW	1916	1	0	1	0
J. Cousarey	Argentina	FW	1916	1	0	1	0
Ernesto Schumann	Argentina	FW	1917–1918	15	0	15	4
Mario Bonnacossa	Argentina	FW	1917	5	0	5	3
Arturo A. Quintana	Argentina	GK	1917	3	0	3	0
Roberto Brown	Argentina	FW	1918	21	0	21	7
Emilio Solari	Argentina	HB	1918–1919	17	0	17	0
Luis A. Líbera	Argentina	GK	1918–1924	15	0	15	0
José Mario Barbieri	Argentina	U	1918	5	0	5	0
Juan Becchia	Argentina	FW	1918	2	0	2	0
Claudio Caprile	Argentina	FW	1918	1	0	1	0
Victorio Bonadeo	Argentina	FW	1919–1922	13	0	13	1
Domingo José Ventura	Argentina	FW	1919–1921	9	0	9	3
Marcos Roldán	Argentina	FW	1919–1920	7	0	7	4
Francisco Ravina	Argentina	FW	1919–1921	7	0	7	0
Antonio Agustín Moretto	Argentina	GK	1919–1921	6	0	6	0
Pablo Simone	Argentina	U	1919–1920	5	0	5	1
Nicolás Sabatini	Argentina	FW	1919–1920	2	0	2	0
Pedro Veloso	Argentina	U	1919–1920	2	0	2	0
Ángel Santambroggio	Argentina	FW	1920	9	0	9	2
Francisco Basilio Locatti	Argentina	FB	1920–1921	2	0	2	0
Arturo Ferrari	Argentina	FB	1920	1	0	1	0
José N. Cafiero	Argentina	FW	1920	1	0	1	0
M. Aspesi	Argentina	FW	1920	1	0	1	0
Antonio Somón	Argentina	FB	1921–1923	12	0	12	1
Eduardo Espoile	Argentina	FW	1921–1924	5	0	5	0
Rogelio Pérez	Argentina	FW	1921	3	0	3	0
Salvador Medina	Argentina	FW	1921	3	0	3	0
Juan Canadá	Argentina	FW	1921–1923	2	0	2	0
Francisco J. Rais	Argentina	GK	1921	1	0	1	0
Miguel Bugallo	Argentina	FW	1921	1	0	1	0
Abelardo Martín Lannot	Argentina	GK	1922–1923	10	0	10	0
Delirio Álvarez	Argentina	FW	1922–1923	5	0	5	0
Vicente Caliendo	Argentina	HB	1922–1924	3	0	3	0
Dante Santiago Pertini	Argentina	FW	1922	1	0	1	0
Jacinto Cacopardo	Argentina	FB	1923–1928	10	0	10	0
Francisco Osilio	Argentina	FW	1923–1928	9	0	9	1
Nicolás Lombardo	Argentina	FW	1923	2	0	2	0
Luis Perazzo	Argentina	GK	1923	1	0	1	0
Pascual Liporassi	Argentina	FW	1923	1	0	1	0
Alberto Rissone	Argentina	U	1924–1926	19	0	19	0
Domingo Lattari	Argentina	FW	1924	15	0	15	5
Humberto José Luis Porta	Argentina	HB	1924–1927	9	0	9	0
Francisco Rey	Argentina	FW	1924–1925	6	0	6	2
Horacio Daniello	Argentina	GK	1924–1929	5	0	5	0
Ricardo Anglese	Argentina	FB	1924	3	0	3	0
Félix Gómez	Argentina	GK	1924	2	0	2	0
Héctor Moyano	Argentina	HB	1924	1	0	1	0
José Suárez	Argentina	FW	1924	1	0	1	0
Pedro Stringa	Argentina	GK	1924	1	0	1	0
José Rodríguez	Argentina	FW	1924	1	0	1	0
Pedro Pappy	Argentina	FB	1924	1	0	1	0
Francisco Noé	Argentina	FW	1924	1	0	1	0
Severiano Serafín Álvarez	Argentina	FW	1925–1926	14	0	14	3
Eugenio Taboada	Argentina	FW	1925–1927	12	0	12	2
Luis Fernando Spadea	Argentina	FW	1925	11	0	11	2
Víctor Ronzoni	Argentina	FW	1925	8	0	8	1
Gregorio Luis Pérez Bertrán	Argentina	FB	1925	8	0	8	0
Aristóbulo Santiago Niecco	Argentina	FW	1925–1926	5	0	5	2
Aníbal Spadini	Argentina	FW	1925	4	0	4	1
Silverio Lazcano Cáceres	Argentina	GK	1925	3	0	3	0
Francisco E. Fazio	Argentina	FW	1925–1927	2	0	2	1
Roberto Squassi	Argentina	GK	1925–1926	2	0	2	0
Ricardo Oliva	Argentina	HB	1925	1	0	1	0
Miguel Navas	Argentina	FW	1925	1	0	1	0
Alberto Gainzarain	Argentina	FW	1926	15	0	15	7
Juan Coviello	Argentina	FW	1926–1927	15	0	15	0
Alberto Carlos Parini	Argentina	FW	1926	9	0	9	2
Juan Meraldi	Argentina	FW	1926	5	0	5	2
Eduardo Biaggi	Argentina	HB	1926	5	0	5	0
Santiago Tomás Power	Argentina	HB	1926	3	0	3	0
Carlos Ahumada	Argentina	FW	1926	3	0	3	0
Serafín Montero	Argentina	HB	1926	2	0	2	0
Irineo Rosas	Argentina	HB	1926	2	0	2	0
C. Pelliza	Argentina	FW	1926	1	0	1	0
Pedro Clementino Fernández	Argentina	FW	1927	19	0	19	12
Juan Mihovich	Argentina	GK	1927–1928	14	0	14	0
Roberto Simone	Argentina	U	1927	12	0	12	0
Luis Maresca	Argentina	HB	1927–1929	12	0	12	0
José Clarke	Argentina	FW	1927	9	0	9	6
Salvador Schiavo	Argentina	U	1927	6	0	6	0
Guillermo Durante	Argentina	FB	1927	4	0	4	0
Victoriano Taboada	Argentina	FW	1927	2	0	2	1
Carlos Oliva	Argentina	FW	1927	1	0	1	0
Antonio Lucena	Argentina	HB	1927	1	0	1	0
P. Carosella	Argentina	FB	1927	1	0	1	0
Pascual Marabito	Argentina	FW	1927	1	0	1	0
Antonio Paduano	Argentina	FW	1928	11	0	11	2
José Ramos	Argentina	FW	1928–1931	9	0	9	1
Alfredo Devincenzi	Argentina	FW	1928	7	0	7	4
R. Zubiaurre Scotto	Argentina	FW	1928	6	0	6	4
Ricardo Dapit	Argentina	FW	1929–1930	22	0	22	7
José A. Constante	Argentina	HB	1929–1930	6	0	6	0
Alberto Evaristo	Argentina	FW	1929	4	0	4	0
Norberto Maiola	Argentina	HB	1930–1935	24	0	24	1
Alberto Rival	Argentina	FB	1930–1931	18	0	18	5
Luis Bausano	Argentina	FB	1930–1931	2	0	2	0
Roberto Ravaschini	Argentina	FW	1930	2	0	2	0
Emilio Oscar Castro	Argentina	FW	1931	19	0	19	16
Camilo C. Méndez	Argentina	FW	1931	16	0	16	1
Mario Celio Artel	Paraguay	FW	1931–1932	13	0	13	1
Ernesto Albarracín	Argentina	HB	1931	11	0	11	0
Juan Carlos Lagos	Argentina	FW	1931–1932	8	0	8	1
Alberto López	Argentina	FB	1931–1933	5	0	5	0
Raúl Ciccarelli	Argentina	HB	1931	3	0	3	0
Oscar Mario Barralía	Argentina	FW	1931	2	0	2	0
Pedro Reynaldo Omar	Argentina	FB	1931	2	0	2	0
Pablo Dorado	Uruguay	FW	1932–1935	24	0	24	1
Vicente Ruscitti	Argentina	HB	1932–1934	24	0	24	0
Oscar José Sciarra	Argentina	FW	1932	20	0	20	8
Osvaldo Landoni	Argentina	FW	1932–1936	19	0	19	0
Agustín Cascio	Argentina	FW	1932–1933; 1937	8	0	8	3
Pablo Renato Ruffo	Argentina	FW	1932	6	0	6	1
Manuel Antonio Quiroga	Argentina	FB	1932–1935	6	0	6	0
Nicolás Matano	Argentina	FW	1932–1933	5	0	5	1
Roberto Albérico	Argentina	FB	1932–1936	5	0	5	0
Vicente D’Errico	Argentina	FB	1932–1933	4	0	4	0
Carlos Horacio Peroni	Argentina	HB	1932–1933	4	0	4	0
Orlando Puccinno	Argentina	GK	1932–1933	4	0	4	0
Francisco Antonio Villegas	Argentina	FW	1932–1933	3	0	3	0
Cataldo Spitale	Argentina	HB	1932–1933	2	0	2	0
Alberto Castillo	Argentina	FW	1932	2	0	2	0
Saúl Quiroga	Argentina	FW	1932	2	0	2	0
Oscar Luis Donato	Argentina	FW	1932	1	0	1	0
Juan Carlos Brisco	Argentina	HB	1932	1	0	1	0
Alberto Anglese	Argentina	HB	1932	1	0	1	0
Emilio Gilardón	Argentina	HB	1932	1	0	1	0
Francisco Martínez	Argentina	FW	1932	1	0	1	0
Ismael Martínez	Uruguay	FW	1933	9	0	9	5
José Agnelli	Argentina	FB	1933–1934	7	0	7	0
Agustín Flores	Argentina	FB	1933	4	0	4	0
Clotardo Dendi	Paraguay	FW	1933–1934	4	0	4	0
Eduardo Luis Davico	Argentina	FW	1933	3	0	3	2
Alberto López Bravo	Argentina	FW	1933	3	0	3	0
Luis Díaz	Argentina	FW	1933	2	0	2	0
Héctor Williams	Argentina	FW	1933	1	0	1	0
Ramón Luna	Argentina	FW	1933	1	0	1	0
Moisés Gross	Argentina	HB	1933	1	0	1	0
Sebastián Gazzera	Argentina	HB	1933	1	0	1	0
Carlos Ángel Locasso	Argentina	FW	1934–1935	17	0	17	6
Benjamín Laterza	Paraguay	FW	1934	17	0	17	4
Natalio Perinetti	Argentina	FW	1934	10	0	10	3
Raúl Valentín Martínez	Argentina	HB	1934–1939	5	0	5	0
Manuel Ferreiro	Argentina	FW	1934–1936	4	0	4	0
José Antonio García	Argentina	FW	1934	2	0	2	0
José Tomás Caivano	Argentina	HB	1934	1	0	1	0
Julio Castillo	Argentina	FW	1935–1936	24	0	24	9
Gregorio Samaniego	Paraguay	FW	1935–1940	20	0	20	5
Carlos Bernabé Moyano	Argentina	FW	1935	12	0	12	4
Luis E. Gusberti	Argentina	FB	1935	3	0	3	0
Absalón Rito Sosa	Argentina	FW	1935	2	0	2	0
Fioravanti Arturo Marullo	Argentina	FB	1935	1	0	1	0
Renato Cesarini	Italy; Argentina	FW	1936–1937	24	0	24	7
Federico Fatechi	Argentina	FB	1936–1938	23	0	23	0
Albino Estanislao Luayza	Argentina	GK	1936	1	0	1	0
Pedro Rolando Manzini	Argentina	GK	1936	1	0	1	0
Cecilio Wilson	Argentina	HB	1936	1	0	1	0
Manuel Iturri	Argentina	FW	1936	1	0	1	0
Arsenio López	Argentina	GK	1937	15	0	15	0
Humberto Coloccini	Argentina	HB	1937–1938	14	0	14	0
Oscar De Dovitis	Argentina	FW	1938	5	0	5	2
Antenor Cristino Medina	Argentina	FB	1938	3	0	3	0
Ángel Eduardo Alfonso	Argentina	FW	1938	2	0	2	2
Humberto Ausili	Argentina	FW	1938	1	0	1	0
Antonio Blanco	Argentina	FB	1939–1941	20	0	20	4
Leonardo Cilaurren	Spain	HB	1939–1940	19	0	19	3
Fernando Nicolás Sánchez	Argentina	HB	1939–1943	18	0	18	1
Florencio Caffaratti	Argentina	FW	1939	14	0	14	6
Mario José Filippo	Argentina	FB	1939–1940	13	0	13	0
José Florencio Martínez	Argentina	FW	1939	12	0	12	2
Ascanio Cortés	Chile	FB	1939	4	0	4	0
Armando Avelino José Díaz	Argentina	HB	1939–1943	4	0	4	0
Humberto Ernesto Maffei	Argentina	FW	1939	2	0	2	2
Aurelio Gonnard	Argentina	FW	1939	2	0	2	0
Marcos Isaac Sabán	Argentina	HB	1939	1	0	1	0
Juan José Sosa	Argentina	HB	1939	1	0	1	0
Ricardo Octavio Stagi	Argentina	FW	1939	1	0	1	0
Gregorio Blasco	Spain	GK	1940	18	0	18	0
Antonio Oscar Rodríguez	Argentina	GK	1940–1941	16	0	16	0
Oscar Pedro Díaz	Argentina	FW	1940	3	0	3	1
Roberto Aballay	Argentina	FW	1940–1942	3	0	3	0
Serafín Aedo	Spain	FB	1940	2	0	2	0
Ismael Rivero	Uruguay	FW	1941	5	0	5	5
Rafael Franco Reyes	Argentina	FW	1941	1	0	1	0
José Oscar Pérez	Argentina	FB	1942	1	0	1	0
Alberto Leopoldo Vouillat	Argentina	GK	1942	2	0	2	0
Eusebio Videla	Argentina	HB	1943–1944	23	0	23	1
Eduardo Lettieri	Argentina	GK	1943	20	0	20	0
Antonio Báez	Argentina	FW	1943–1947	11	0	11	5
Oscar Basso	Argentina	FB	1943	4	0	4	0
Román Bruno Quevedo	Argentina	FW	1943	3	0	3	1
Joaquín Bermúdez	Uruguay	FB	1944	16	0	16	0
Elgidio Cándido Corvalán	Argentina	FB	1944–1946	8	0	8	0
Segundo Alfonso Díaz	Argentina	HB	1944	5	0	5	0
Mario Morosano	Argentina	HB	1944	1	0	1	0
Daniel Stemberg	Argentina	HB	1945	1	0	1	0
Alberto Gennari	Argentina	FW	1946	1	0	1	0
Francisco Rodríguez	Argentina	FW	1947	8	0	8	5
Osvaldo Méndez	Argentina	FB	1947–1948	4	0	4	0
Oscar Coll	Argentina	FW	1948–1950	24	0	24	8
Omar Guillermo Rossi	Argentina	HB	1948; 1956	18	0	18	0
Gerónimo Jorge Parra	Argentina	FB	1948–1951	13	0	13	0
Hipólito Leandro Cardozo	Argentina	FW	1948–1949	5	0	5	3
Rubén Nicolás Lattanzio	Argentina	FW	1948	5	0	5	2
Roberto Rubén Otero	Argentina	FW	1948	5	0	5	1
Mario Mussi	Argentina	GK	1948–1949	5	0	5	0
Alfredo Benseñor	Argentina	FB	1948	4	0	4	0
Dionisio Liberato Marín	Argentina	HB	1948	4	0	4	0
Felipe Rubén Stemberg	Argentina	FB	1948–1949	3	0	3	0
José Brígido Camaño	Argentina	FW	1948	2	0	2	0
Rubí Cerioni	Argentina	FW	1948–1949	2	0	2	0
Higinio Vázquez	Argentina	HB	1948	2	0	2	0
Héctor Pacheco	Argentina	GK	1948	2	0	2	0
Carlos Jorge Turcato	Argentina	FW	1948	2	0	2	0
Mario Sabbatella	Argentina	FW	1948	1	0	1	0
Rodolfo Germán Iglesias	Argentina	FB	1948	1	0	1	0
Luis Ángel Accardi	Argentina	FW	1948	1	0	1	0
Ángel De Cicco	Argentina	FW	1949	9	0	9	4
Adolfo Luis Montes	Argentina	HB	1949	7	0	7	0
Juan Carlos Spada	Argentina	HB	1949–1952	7	0	7	0
Juan Antonio Pérez	Argentina	FW	1949	3	0	3	1
Santiago José Armándola	Argentina	FW	1949	3	0	3	0
Raúl Martínez	Argentina	FW	1949	2	0	2	0
Ramón Felipe Moyano	Argentina	FW	1949	1	0	1	1
Arnoldo Rodolfo Gobbo	Argentina	HB	1949	1	0	1	0
José Sánchez Lage	Argentina	FW	1950; 1955–1957	24	0	24	5
Octavio Trillini	Argentina	FB	1950–1956	22	0	22	0
Luis Ernesto Castro	Uruguay	FW	1950	20	0	20	4
Manuel Barbeito	Argentina	FW	1950	9	0	9	2
Carlos Alberto Díaz	Argentina	HB	1950–1954	9	0	9	0
Oscar Alfredo Ledesma	Argentina	HB	1950	3	0	3	0
Ángel Rocha	Argentina	GK	1950–1951	3	0	3	0
Lauro Miguel Martínez	Argentina	FB	1950	2	0	2	0
Esteban Leban	Argentina	FB	1950	1	0	1	0
Vicente Gambardella	Argentina	FW	1951–1953	9	0	9	1
Alberto Dezorzi	Argentina	FW	1951	7	0	7	4
Martín Alarcón	Argentina	FW	1951	1	0	1	0
Alberto Nicolás Evaristo	Argentina	FW	1952–1953	14	0	14	3
Augusto Fumero	Argentina	GK	1952–1954	9	0	9	0
Luis Isidro Bravo	Argentina	FW	1952	5	0	5	0
Miguel Ángel Gallo	Argentina	HB	1952	1	0	1	0
Félix Respuela	Argentina	FW	1953–1954	8	0	8	1
Antonio Cammaratta	Argentina	GK	1953	1	0	1	0
Pascual Adessio	Argentina	GK	1954	1	0	1	0
Raúl Hernández	Argentina	FB	1955–1958	24	0	24	0
Roberto Puissegur	Argentina	HB	1955	1	0	1	0
Henry Magri	Argentina	HB	1956–1958	15	0	15	0
Carlos Lara	Argentina; Mexico	FW	1956	4	0	4	3
Francisco Sosa	Argentina	FW	1956	4	0	4	2
Juan Carlos Russo	Argentina	FW	1956–1957	4	0	4	1
Rodolfo Matti	Argentina	FW	1956	2	0	2	0
César Horacio Torres	Argentina	FB	1956	1	0	1	1
Juan Vairo	Argentina	FW	1957–1958	24	0	24	9
Miguel Ángel Rodríguez	Argentina	FW	1957–1959	22	0	22	6
Ricardo Ramaciotti	Argentina	FW	1957–1959	20	0	20	1
Héctor Scandoli	Argentina	FW	1957–1958	16	0	16	4
Hugo Zarich	Argentina	HB	1958	13	0	13	4
Juan Carlos Valentino	Argentina	FB	1958–1959	13	0	13	1
Luis Ángel Petrillo	Argentina	FB	1958	10	0	10	0
Carlos Rubén Villagarcía	Argentina	FW	1958–1961	9	0	9	3
Rodolfo Micheli	Argentina	FW	1958	8	0	8	0
Luis Zoilo Masuelli	Argentina	GK	1958	4	0	4	0
Orfel Antonio Cortés	Argentina	GK	1958	3	0	3	0
Hugo Emilio Bianchi	Argentina	FB	1958	2	0	2	0
Rolando Irusta	Argentina	GK	1958	1	0	1	0
Eduardo Ramón Rodríguez	Argentina	FW	1958	1	0	1	0
Vicente Copertino	Argentina	FB	1958	1	0	1	0
Ramón Alberto Salas	Argentina	FW	1958	1	0	1	0
Luis Ciacia	Argentina	FW	1959	13	0	13	3
Galdino Luraschi	Argentina	FW	1959–1963	7	0	7	1
Iseo Fausto Roselló	Uruguay	FW	1959	6	0	6	2
Domingo Rodríguez	Argentina	FW	1959	6	0	6	1
Mario Leardi	Argentina	FW	1959	5	0	5	1
José Raúl Giaimo	Argentina	HB	1959	5	0	5	0
Juan Joya	Peru	FW	1960	21	0	21	7
Víctor Hugo Doval	Argentina	DF	1960–1961	15	0	15	0
Paulinho	Brazil	FW	1960	14	0	14	4
Héctor Pederzoli	Argentina	MF	1960–1961	14	0	14	1
José Carbone	Argentina	FW	1960	3	0	3	0
José Luis Ramilo	Argentina	FW	1960	1	0	1	0
Domingo Pérez	Uruguay	FW	1961	22	0	22	6
Pepillo	Spain	FW	1961	18	0	18	8
Salvador	Brazil	MF	1961	14	0	14	1
Francisco Lombardo	Argentina	DF	1961	9	0	9	0
Nelson López	Argentina	DF	1961	7	0	7	0
Osmar Ramón Rodríguez	Argentina	DF	1961	6	0	6	0
José Luis Luna	Argentina	FW	1961	5	0	5	2
Alfredo Rojas	Argentina	FW	1961	3	0	3	2
Decio Crespo	Brazil	DF	1961	1	0	1	0
Roque Ditro	Argentina	DF	1962–1964	23	0	23	0
Rogelio Domínguez	Argentina	GK	1962–1963	9	0	9	0
Mario Griguol	Argentina	FW	1962	6	0	6	2
Jorge Alberto Diz	Argentina	FW	1962	6	0	6	0
Juan Carlos Barberis	Argentina	DF	1962	4	0	4	0
Marcelo Pagani	Argentina	FW	1962	3	0	3	0
Néstor Isella	Argentina	MF	1962	1	0	1	0
Jorge Domínguez	Argentina	FW	1962	1	0	1	0
Eladio Rojas	Chile	FW	1963–1964	9	0	9	1
Ernesto Juárez	Argentina	FW	1963	5	0	5	1
Deraldo Conceição	Brazil	FW	1963	4	0	4	0
Pedro Roberto Ornad	Argentina	MF	1963	2	0	2	0
Enrique Fernández	Argentina	MF	1964–1965; 1969	23	1	24	0
Mario Bonczuk	Argentina	DF	1964–1965	16	0	16	0
Alfredo Mackeprang	Argentina	DF	1964	1	0	1	0
Héctor Moisés Siles	Argentina	MF	1964	1	0	1	0
Carlos Raúl Panizo	Argentina	DF	1966–1970	12	1	13	0
Pedro Prospitti	Argentina	FW	1966	8	0	8	1
Ricardo Ramón Pérez	Argentina	FW	1966–1967	7	1	8	0
Miguel Hugo Rivarola	Argentina	FW	1966	5	0	5	0
José Alberto Minore	Argentina	DF	1966–1967	3	0	3	0
Humberto Ballesteros	Argentina	GK	1966	2	0	2	0
Hugo D’Ambrosio	Argentina	DF	1966	1	0	1	0
Jorge Chávez	Argentina	DF	1967–1968	11	0	11	0
José Luis Cruz	Argentina	FW	1967–1968	10	0	10	2
Osvaldo Camargo	Argentina	FW	1967	2	0	2	0
Alfredo Gironacci	Argentina	GK	1968–1969	15	0	15	0
Juan Luis Vitali	Argentina	FW	1968	4	0	4	0
Héctor Minniti	Argentina	FW	1969–1970	14	6	20	1
Aníbal Cibeyra	Argentina	FW	1969–1972	10	6	16	1
Raúl Ricardo Noguera	Argentina	FW	1969	3	3	6	2
Eduardo Dreyer	Argentina	MF	1969–1970	6	0	6	0
Francisco Sá	Argentina	DF	1969–1970	2	0	2	0
Daniel Silguero	Argentina	DF	1970	19	0	19	0
Enzo Gennoni	Argentina	FW	1970	12	3	15	2
Eduardo Anzarda	Argentina	FW	1970–1971	7	3	10	3
Juan Carlos Méndez	Argentina	FW	1970	3	0	3	0
Roberto Carrizo	Argentina	MF	1971–1972	0	6	6	0
Alfredo José Granato	Argentina	FW	1971	2	0	2	1
Atilio Herrera	Argentina	DF	1971	1	1	2	0
Mario Finarolli	Argentina	MF	1971	0	1	1	0
Jorge Berrio	Argentina	DF	1972	9	2	11	0
Ramón Manuel Roa	Argentina	MF	1972–1973	3	1	4	0
Daniel Mammana	Argentina	DF	1972	0	1	1	0
Jorge Pascual Anllo	Argentina	FW	1972	0	1	1	0
Ramón Orlando Sánchez	Argentina	MF	1973	7	2	9	0
Carlos Alberto Martínez	Argentina	FW	1973	6	2	8	0
Horacio Edgardo Coll	Argentina	DF	1973–1974	4	1	5	0
Héctor Oscar Jerez	Argentina	DF	1973	4	0	4	1
Sergio Cierra	Argentina	MF	1973	3	1	4	0
Carlos Pafundi	Argentina	FW	1973	0	3	3	0
Roberto Echeverría	Argentina	MF	1973	0	1	1	0
Eduardo Carranza	Argentina	MF	1974	16	2	18	1
Carlos Salinas	Argentina	FW	1974–1975	3	9	12	0
Fernando Zappia	Argentina	DF	1974–1976	9	2	11	0
Adolfo Mecca	Argentina	FW	1974	5	4	9	1
Walter Durso	Argentina	FW	1974	4	3	7	1
Carlos María Pintos	Argentina	MF	1974	6	1	7	0
Dardo Norberto Urchevik	Argentina	DF	1974	3	0	3	0
Pedro Agustín Fernández	Argentina	MF	1974–1976	2	1	3	0
Rubén Mario Cabrera	Argentina	MF	1974–1975	1	2	3	0
Jorge Carlos Altamir	Argentina	MF	1974	0	1	1	0
Daniel Mario Crespo	Argentina	MF	1975–1976	10	11	21	2
Rubén Bruno	Argentina	FW	1975–1976	10	2	12	2
Héctor Norberto Bargas	Argentina	MF	1975–1978	6	2	8	0
Alberto Vivalda	Argentina	GK	1975; 1987–1988	4	3	7	0
Luis Alberto Jometón	Argentina	DF	1975	2	0	2	0
Ramón Orlando Gómez	Argentina	MF	1975	1	0	1	0
Orlando Rubén Ponce	Argentina	DF	1975	1	0	1	0
Leonardo Labonia	Argentina	FW	1975	1	0	1	0
Francisco Alberto Groppa	Argentina	FW	1975	1	0	1	0
Sergio Esteban Gigli	Argentina	MF	1975	0	1	1	0
Luis María Giménez	Argentina	FW	1975	0	1	1	0
Francisco Russo	Argentina	MF	1976	15	4	19	1
Alberto Beltrán	Argentina	MF	1976	12	3	15	3
Victorio Cocco	Argentina	MF	1976	3	11	14	1
Jorge Bianco	Argentina	MF	1976–1978	8	5	13	0
Hugo Alberto Urquiza	Argentina	DF	1976	9	0	9	2
Ricardo Lazbal	Argentina	MF	1976	7	2	9	2
Pedro Mareque	Argentina	FW	1976	2	4	6	0
Juan Carlos Mamelli	Argentina	FW	1976	1	0	1	0
Omar Ángel Correa	Uruguay	GK	1976	1	0	1	0
Mario Alberto Ruiz	Argentina	DF	1976	1	0	1	0
Carlos Seppaquercia	Argentina	FW	1977–1978	13	4	17	5
Aldo Zeballos	Argentina	DF	1977–1978	13	1	14	0
Ibrahim Hallar	Argentina	FW	1977	3	6	9	2
Luis Alberto Amorone	Argentina	DF	1977–1978	5	3	8	0
Ramón Oscar Telli	Argentina	FW	1977	3	0	3	2
Juan Carlos Delménico	Argentina	GK	1978	4	0	4	0
Jorge Troncoso	Argentina	DF	1978	3	0	3	0
Bernabé Ferreyra	Argentina	FW	1978	0	1	1	0
Juan Carlos Heredia	Argentina; Spain	FW	1980–1981	18	4	22	5
Daniel Costantino	Argentina	FW	1980–1983	6	13	19	1
Eduardo Abrahamián	Argentina	DF	1980–1981	2	2	4	0
Jorge Luis Romero	Argentina	DF	1980	1	1	2	0
Miguel Ángel Torres	Argentina	GK	1980	0	1	1	0
Jorge Carlos De la Torre	Argentina	FW	1980	0	1	1	0
Hugo Iervasi	Argentina	MF	1981	15	6	21	0
René Houseman	Argentina	FW	1981	11	4	15	1
Jorge Luis Ferrero	Argentina	GK	1981–1982	15	0	15	0
Carlos Russo	Argentina	DF	1981–1984	12	2	14	0
Eduardo Savarese	Argentina	DF	1981–1982	11	2	13	0
Agustín Cejas	Argentina	GK	1981	9	0	9	0
Néstor De Vicente	Argentina	FW	1982–1984	17	7	24	2
Rubén Cocimano	Argentina	DF	1982–1983	15	3	18	0
Oscar Alberto Medina	Argentina	FW	1982–1983	2	6	8	0
Ariel Sergio Dacko	Argentina	DF	1982–1983	6	0	6	0
Alberto Eduardo Montes	Argentina	GK	1982	3	0	3	0
Fabián Alejandro Guido	Argentina	FW	1982	0	1	1	0
Víctor Trossero	Argentina	FW	1983	22	0	22	7
Héctor Vittor	Argentina	DF	1983–1987	20	1	21	0
Mariano Dalla Libera	Argentina	MF	1983–1988	12	6	18	0
José Luis Zuttión	Argentina	MF	1983	6	9	15	0
Roque Erba	Argentina	MF	1983	5	3	8	0
Guillermo Fabián Nicosia	Argentina	DF	1983–1984	8	0	8	0
Claudio Gavazzi	Argentina	FW	1983	3	4	7	1
Adrián Rodríguez	Argentina	GK	1983	7	0	7	0
Sergio Francisco Mercado	Argentina	FW	1983	6	0	6	2
Fabio Nigro	Argentina	MF	1983	6	0	6	0
Daniel Ricardo Vélez	Argentina	DF	1983–1984	3	0	3	0
Fabio Ariel Spotorno	Argentina	DF	1983–1986	1	2	3	0
Mauricio Alejandro Trillo	Argentina	DF	1983	1	1	2	0
Roberto Oscar Diéguez	Argentina	DF	1983	2	0	2	0
Sandro Elmo Andreani	Argentina	MF	1983	2	0	2	0
Sergio Ricardo Scivoletto	Argentina	DF	1983	1	0	1	0
Luis Enrique Gennero	Argentina	DF	1983	1	0	1	0
Carlos María Cochella	Argentina	GK	1983	0	1	1	0
Claudio Manuel López	Argentina	MF	1983	1	0	1	0
Néstor Píccoli	Argentina	FW	1984–1986	4	12	16	4
Oscar Craiyacich	Argentina	DF	1984–1985	13	1	14	0
Carlos Gay	Argentina	GK	1984	4	0	4	0
José Luis Gaitán	Argentina	MF	1984	2	2	4	0
Adrián Marcelo Pasceri	Argentina	FW	1984	0	3	3	0
Sergio Horacio Santillán	Argentina	DF	1984	1	0	1	0
Osvaldo Rinaldi	Argentina	MF	1985–1986	6	8	14	0
Ricardo Gareca	Argentina	FW	1985	12	0	12	4
Carlos Berrueta	Uruguay	MF	1985	5	1	6	0
Oscar López Turitich	Paraguay	DF	1985	3	2	5	0
Luis Alberto Acosta	Uruguay	FW	1985	0	1	1	0
Rubens Navarro	Uruguay	MF	1986–1987	16	6	22	1
Mario Saralegui	Uruguay	MF	1986–1987	14	6	20	2
Pedro Sallaberry	Argentina	FW	1986–1988	7	13	20	1
Daniel Sperandío	Argentina	MF	1986–1987	14	6	20	0
Gabriel Perrone	Argentina	DF	1986–1988	10	3	13	0
Sergio Miguez	Argentina	DF	1986	7	0	7	0
Jorge Adrián Esteche	Argentina	FW	1986–1988	0	2	2	0
Juan Bautista Chumba	Argentina	MF	1986	0	1	1	0
Ariel Raúl Medri	Argentina	FW	1987	0	1	1	0
Milton Melgar	Bolivia	MF	1988–1989	15	8	23	0
Claudio Borghi	Argentina	MF	1988–1989	20	1	21	0
Gerardo Reinoso	Argentina	MF	1988–1989	13	7	20	4
Jorge Rinaldi	Argentina	FW	1988–1989	7	11	18	2
Mario Bevilacqua	Argentina	FW	1988–1989	3	11	14	5
Ariel Beltramo	Argentina	FW	1988–1991	1	10	11	2
Carlos Alberto Candia	Argentina	MF	1988	5	2	7	0
Ricardo Omar Mattis	Argentina	DF	1988–1990	4	1	5	0
Juan Carlos Cataldo	Argentina	FW	1988–1989	0	3	3	0
Claudio Alejandro Macri	Argentina	MF	1988	2	0	2	0
Fernando Kuyumchoglu	Argentina	DF	1988	1	0	1	0
Gabriel Batistuta	Argentina	FW	1989–1990	20	4	24	4
Hugo De León	Uruguay	DF	1989	11	1	12	0
Daniel Oldrá	Argentina	DF	1989–1991	8	3	11	0
Ramiro Castillo	Bolivia	MF	1990–1991	8	4	12	1
Leo Fernández	Argentina	FW	1990	6	4	10	3
Gabriel del Valle	Argentina	DF	1990–1991	8	0	8	0
Daniel Ernesto Gutiérrez	Argentina	MF	1990–1991	5	2	7	0
Carlos Gabriel Batista	Argentina	FW	1990	4	0	4	0
Norberto Darío Decoud	Argentina	FW	1990–1991	1	1	2	0
Marcelo Rouillet	Argentina	DF	1990	0	1	1	0
Jorge Theiler	Argentina	DF	1991	11	1	12	0
Claudio Spontón	Argentina	FW	1991–1992	5	4	9	2
Fernando Eduardo Castro	Argentina	FW	1991	4	5	9	1
Diego Claudio Siciliano	Argentina	MF	1991–1992	2	2	4	0
Alberto Eduardo Garay	Argentina	DF	1991	2	1	3	0
Roberto Adrián Clérico	Argentina	DF	1991–1993	2	1	3	0
Javier Zeoli	Uruguay	GK	1992–1993	15	0	15	0
Alfonso Domínguez	Uruguay	DF	1992–1993	13	0	13	0
Oscar Román Acosta	Argentina	MF	1992	8	4	12	2
Jorge Balbis	Argentina	DF	1992–1993	12	0	12	0
Rodrigo Luis Tomás Burela	Argentina	GK	1992	0	1	1	0
Carlos Bustos	Argentina	DF	1993	22	0	22	1
José Luis Villarreal	Argentina	MF	1993–1995	11	5	16	2
Fernando Gamboa	Argentina	DF	1993–1994	15	1	16	0
José Albornoz	Argentina	MF	1993–1994	7	7	14	0
Hernán Buján	Argentina	MF	1993	0	1	1	0
Hernán Raciti	Argentina	DF	1994–1995	0	2	2	0
Alejandro Ojeda	Argentina	FW	1994	0	2	2	0
Leonardo Vujacich	Argentina	FW	1994	0	1	1	0
Joaquín Irigoytía	Argentina	GK	1995–1996	20	0	20	0
Julio Hernán Rossi	Argentina	FW	1995–1996; 1998	5	6	11	1
Mariano Juan	Argentina	MF	1995–1996	6	1	7	0
Matías Biscay	Argentina	U	1995–1996	5	2	7	0
Alberto García Aspe	Mexico	FW	1995	6	1	7	0
Rodrigo Riep	Argentina	MF	1995	1	2	3	0
Adán Cristian Molina	Argentina	MF	1995	2	0	2	0
Antonio Rubén Luna	Argentina	DF	1995	1	1	2	0
Norberto Gabriel Alonso	Argentina	MF	1995	2	0	2	0
Gastón Andrés Vales	Argentina	DF	1995	1	0	1	0
Hernán Carlos Oreiro	Argentina	MF	1995	1	0	1	0
Darío Figueroa	Argentina	MF	1996–1998	0	5	5	1
Gino Padula	Argentina	DF	1996	3	0	3	0
Sebastián Diego Pena	Argentina	DF	1996	1	2	3	0
Rodrigo Vilariño	Argentina	MF	1996	0	1	1	0
Norberto Acosta	Argentina	DF	1997–2000	12	4	16	0
Hernán Maisterra	Argentina	MF	1997	3	11	14	0
Jorge Daniel Martínez	Argentina	DF	1998–1999	11	13	24	0
Pablo Ricchetti	Argentina	DF	1998	4	2	6	0
Alejandro Saccone	Argentina	GK	1998–2005	2	1	3	0
Luciano Beutler	Argentina	FW	1998	0	3	3	0
Leonardo Ezequiel Barraza	Argentina	MF	1998	1	1	2	0
Héctor Hugo Villalba	Argentina	DF	1998	0	2	2	0
Cristian Green	Argentina	DF	1998	1	0	1	0
Gastón Sessa	Argentina	GK	1999–2000	3	0	3	0
Omar Mallea	Argentina	MF	1999	1	0	1	0
Darío Sala	Argentina	GK	2000	2	0	2	0
Juan Pablo Raponi	Argentina	MF	2001–2002	0	8	8	0
Adrián Roberto Romero	Argentina	FW	2001	2	5	7	0
Carlos Chacana	Argentina	FW	2001	1	1	2	0
Alejandro Escalona	Chile	MF	2001–2002	2	0	2	0
Eduardo Lermée	Argentina	DF	2001	1	0	1	0
Juan Esnaider	Argentina	FW	2002	6	8	14	1
Jersson González	Colombia	DF	2002	5	3	8	0
Luciano Leguizamón	Argentina	FW	2002–2005	0	4	4	0
Andrés Aimar	Argentina	MF	2002	2	1	3	1
Daniel Fonseca	Uruguay	FW	2002	0	2	2	0
Emiliano Díaz	Italy	MF	2002	0	1	1	0
Fernando Crosa	Argentina	DF	2003–2005	20	2	22	1
Federico Almerares	Argentina	MF	2003–2007	10	6	16	2
Kilian Virviescas	Colombia	DF	2003–2004	11	5	16	0
Nelson Vivas	Argentina	DF	2003	8	2	10	0
Franco Miranda	Argentina	DF	2003–2004	9	0	9	0
Luis Lobo	Argentina	DF	2003–2004	3	2	5	0
Federico Higuaín	Argentina	FW	2003–2005	0	5	5	0
Martín Del Campo	Uruguay	DF	2003	4	0	4	0
Máximo Lucas	Uruguay	DF	2003	3	0	3	0
Darío Conca	Argentina	MF	2003	1	2	3	0
Pablo Frontini	Argentina	DF	2003	3	0	3	0
Jesús Méndez	Argentina	MF	2004–2006	10	13	23	1
Pablo Barzola	Argentina	DF	2004–2005	9	0	9	0
Patricio Toranzo	Argentina	MF	2004–2005	2	2	4	1
Carlos Diogo	Uruguay	DF	2005	21	0	21	1
Gustavo Oberman	Argentina	FW	2005–2006	11	10	21	0
Leandro Fernández	Argentina	DF	2005	21	0	21	0
Gabriel Loeschbor	Argentina	DF	2005	6	0	6	0
Facundo Martínez	Argentina	MF	2005	0	1	1	0
Lucas Pusineri	Argentina	FW	2006	7	8	15	0
Gonzalo Abán	Argentina	FW	2006	11	2	13	1
Mateo Musacchio	Argentina	DF	2006–2009	7	4	11	0
Luciano Figueroa	Argentina	FW	2006	5	5	10	3
Juan Antonio	Argentina	FW	2006–2010	0	8	8	0
Juan Carlos Toja	Colombia	MF	2006	3	0	3	1
Gonzalo Ludueña	Argentina	FW	2006–2010	1	2	3	0
Matías Oyola	Argentina; Ecuador	MF	2006	1	2	3	0
Marcelo Sosa	Uruguay	MF	2006	1	2	3	0
Jerónimo Morales Neumann	Argentina	FW	2006	0	2	2	1
José San Román	Argentina	DF	2006	1	0	1	0
Ricardo Fabián Villalba	Argentina	DF	2006	0	1	1	0
Nelson Rivas	Colombia	DF	2007	12	2	14	0
Rolando Zárate	Argentina	FW	2007	1	7	8	1
Sixto Peralta	Argentina	MF	2007	4	3	7	1
Sebastián Sciorilli	Argentina	MF	2007–2008	2	3	5	0
Emmanuel Martínez	Argentina	DF	2007–2008	4	0	4	0
Damián Lizio	Argentina; Bolivia	MF	2007–2009	1	2	3	0
Maximiliano Oliva	Argentina	DF	2007	2	0	2	0
Carlos Valencia	Colombia	DF	2007	2	0	2	0
Matías Gastón Díaz	Argentina	MF	2007	1	0	1	0
Marcelo Burzac	Argentina	MF	2007	0	1	1	0
Santiago Salcedo	Paraguay	FW	2008	14	4	18	2
Robert Flores	Uruguay	MF	2008–2009	6	9	15	2
Gonzalo Gil	Argentina	FW	2008–2009	1	3	4	0
Fabio Rodrigo Giménez	Argentina	MF	2008	2	1	3	0
Omar Merlo	Argentina	MF	2008	2	0	2	1
Maximiliano Coronel	Argentina	DF	2009–2010	12	4	16	0
Lucas Orban	Argentina	DF	2009	11	0	11	0
Mariano Barbosa	Argentina	GK	2009	7	0	7	0
Gustavo Fernández	Argentina	FW	2009	2	4	6	0
Nicolás Navarro	Argentina	GK	2009	5	0	5	0
Miguel Paniagua	Paraguay	MF	2009	4	0	4	0
Leandro Caruso	Argentina	MF	2010–2011	9	13	22	4
Rodrigo Rojas	Paraguay	MF	2010	13	6	19	0
Gustavo Canales	Argentina; Chile	MF	2010	10	4	14	2
Josepmir Ballón	Peru	MF	2010–2011	7	5	12	0
Luciano Vella	Argentina	DF	2011–2012	19	2	21	0
César González	Venezuela	MF	2011–2012	8	7	15	1
Fabián Bordagaray	Argentina	FW	2011	0	9	9	1
Agustín Alayes	Argentina	DF	2011	6	0	6	0
Juan Cazares	Ecuador	FW	2011–2012	1	5	6	0
Diego Hermes Martínez	Argentina	DF	2012–2013	12	1	13	0
Luis Vila	Argentina	FW	2012	0	2	2	0
Federico Andrada	Argentina	MF	2013–2014	9	11	20	1
Tomás Martínez	Argentina	MF	2013–2015	5	14	19	0
Juan Manuel Iturbe	Argentina; Paraguay	FW	2013	9	8	17	3
Jonathan Fabbro	Argentina; Paraguay	FW	2013–2014	12	3	15	0
Juan Carlos Menseguez	Argentina	FW	2013–2014	4	9	13	1
Juan Cruz Kaprof	Argentina	FW	2013–2015	1	4	5	1
Federico Vega	Argentina	DF	2013	2	0	2	0
Esteban Espíndola	Argentina	DF	2013	1	0	1	0
Sebastián Silguero	Argentina	DF	2013	1	0	1	0
Nicolás Gómez	Argentina	MF	2013	0	1	1	0
Julio Chiarini	Argentina	GK	2014–2015	17	2	19	0
Guido Rodríguez	Argentina	MF	2014–2015	15	3	18	1
Bruno Urribarri	Argentina	U	2014–2015	6	1	7	0
Víctor Cabrera	Argentina	DF	2014	1	0	1	0
Nicolás Bertolo	Argentina	MF	2015–2016	15	8	23	0
Leandro Vega	Argentina	DF	2015–2016	14	0	14	0
Luis Olivera	Argentina	DF	2015–2017	8	2	10	0
Pablo Carreras	Argentina	DF	2015–2016	4	1	5	0
Franco López	Argentina	FW	2015–2016	1	2	3	0
Abel Casquete	Ecuador	MF	2015	0	3	3	0
Lautaro Arellano	Argentina	MF	2015	1	0	1	0
Claudio Salto	Argentina	FW	2015	0	1	1	0
Arturo Mina	Ecuador	DF	2016–2017	18	2	20	2
Iván Rossi	Argentina	MF	2016–2017	10	10	20	0
Joaquín Arzura	Argentina	MF	2016–2017	11	8	19	1
Enrique Bologna	Argentina	GK	2016–2021	17	1	18	0
Marcelo Larrondo	Argentina	FW	2016–2017	4	10	14	2
Matías Moya	Argentina	MF	2016–2018	2	2	4	1
Denis Rodríguez	Argentina	FW	2016–2017	1	2	3	0
Luciano Lollo	Argentina	DF	2017–2019	14	2	16	1
Nahuel Gallardo	Argentina	DF	2017–2019	6	1	7	0
Alexander Barboza	Argentina	DF	2017	5	1	6	0
Kevin Sibille	Argentina	DF	2017–2019	4	0	4	0
Alan Marcel Picazzo	Argentina	FW	2017–2019	0	2	2	1
Santiago Vera	Argentina	MF	2017–2019	0	2	2	0
Maximiliano Velazco	Argentina	GK	2017	1	0	1	0
Zacarías Morán	Argentina	MF	2017	1	0	1	0
Augusto Aguirre	Argentina	DF	2017	1	0	1	0
Santiago Sosa	Argentina	MF	2018–2020	11	10	21	0
Elías López	Argentina	DF	2019	3	0	3	0
Hernán López Muñoz	Argentina	MF	2019	0	1	1	1
Franco Paredes	Argentina	DF	2020	1	0	1	0
Tomás Castro Ponce	Argentina	MF	2020	0	1	1	0
Alex Vigo	Argentina	DF	2021	14	5	19	0
Agustín Fontana	Argentina	FW	2021	4	11	15	0
Felipe Peña Biafore	Argentina	MF	2021–2024	13	0	13	0
Tomás Lecanda	Argentina	DF	2021	2	1	3	0
Leo Díaz	Argentina	GK	2021	1	0	1	0
Daniel Lucero	Argentina	MF	2021	0	1	1	0
Felipe Salomoni	Argentina	DF	2021	0	1	1	0
Tomás Pochettino	Argentina	MF	2022	7	17	24	1
Ezequiel Centurión †	Argentina	GK	2022–	10	1	11	0
Sebastián Boselli	Uruguay	DF	2023–2025	15	4	19	1
Franco Alfonso	Argentina	MF	2023	0	7	7	0
Adam Bareiro	Paraguay	FW	2024	5	11	16	0
Agustín Sant'Anna	Uruguay	DF	2024	7	6	13	0
Conan Ledesma	Argentina	GK	2024–2025	7	0	7	0
Federico Gattoni	Argentina	DF	2024–2025	6	1	7	0
Daniel Zabala	Argentina	DF	2024	3	2	5	0
Agustín Ruberto †	Argentina	FW	2024–	3	20	23	1
Matías Galarza	Paraguay	MF	2025	6	8	14	0
Matías Rojas	Paraguay	MF	2025	0	8	8	1
Gonzalo Tapia	Chile	FW	2025	2	5	7	0
Ulises Giménez †	Argentina	DF	2025–	1	3	4	0
Juan Portillo †	Argentina	U	2025–	14	4	18	0
Bautista Dadín	Argentina	FW	2025–2026	1	3	4	0
Giorgio Costantini †	Brazil	MF	2025–	0	3	3	0
Thiago Acosta	Argentina	MF	2025–2026	2	2	4	0
Cristian Jaime	Argentina	MF	2025–2026	0	4	4	0
Agustín De la Cuesta	Argentina	MF	2025	1	0	1	0
Agustín Obregón	Argentina	MF	2025	0	1	1	0
Facundo González †	Argentina	DF	2026–	5	4	9	0
Matías Viña	Uruguay	DF	2026	10	4	14	0
Kendry Páez	Ecuador	MF	2026	3	11	14	1
Lautaro Pereyra †	Argentina	MF	2026–	3	13	16	1
Tobías Ramírez †	Argentina	DF	2026–	1	0	1	0
Lucas Silva †	Argentina	MF	2026–	5	6	11	1
Jonathan Spiff †	Argentina	FW	2026–	0	2	2	0
Giovanni González †	Uruguay	DF	2026–	3	4	7	0
Mauro Arambarri †	Uruguay	MF	2026–	1	7	8	0
Nicolás Otamendi †	Argentina	DF	2026–	18	0	18	0
Ángel Correa †	Argentina	FW	2026–	16	1	17	5
Valentín Lucero †	Argentina	DF	2026–	0	2	2	0
Francisco Ortega †	Argentina	DF	2026–	5	5	10	0
Tobias Andrada †	Argentina	MF	2026–	15	0	15	1
Thiago Almada †	Argentina	MF	2026–	12	2	14	3
Santiago Espíndola †	Argentina	MF	2026–	1	0	1	0
