= 1998 Recopa Sudamericana =

- Event: Recopa Sudamericana
Cruzeiro	River Plate
(Brazil)	(Argentina)
5	0

First leg
Cruzeiro	River Plate
2	0
- Date: August 3, 1999
- Venue: Mineirão, Belo Horizonte
- Referee: Jose Luís da Rosa (Uruguay)
- Attendance: 18,000

Second leg
River Plate	Cruzeiro
0	3
- Date: September 23, 1999
- Venue: Monumental, Buenos Aires
- Referee: Ubaldo Aquino (Paraguay)
- Attendance: 11,000

The 1998 Recopa Sudamericana was the tenth Recopa Sudamericana, an annual football match between the winners of the previous season's Copa Libertadores and Supercopa Sudamericana competitions. This will become the last Recopa Sudamericana on this format as the Supercopa Sudamericana was discontinued by CONMEBOL in 1998. With no existing secondary tournament, the Recopa Sudamericana became an impracticable competition until the introduction of the Copa Sudamericana in 2002.

The series was contested between Cruzeiro, winners of the 1997 Copa Libertadores, and River Plate, winners of the 1997 Supercopa Sudamericana, in a two-legged series. Due to schedule congestion, this edition was played as part of the 1999 Copa Mercosur (one of the two tournaments that replaced the Supercopa Sudamericana) two years after the participating clubs won their respective qualifying tournaments (instead of the regular 6–12 months). Further devaluing this year's Recopa, River Plate sent a reserved squad on the first leg losing 2-0. On the return leg, Cruzeiro thrashed River Plate 3–0 and won their first Recopa Sudamericana (after failing to do so in 1992 and 1993).

== Qualified teams ==
Team	Previous finals app.
(Argentina) River Plate	1997
(Brazil) Cruzeiro	1992, 1993

Bold indicates winning years

== Venues ==
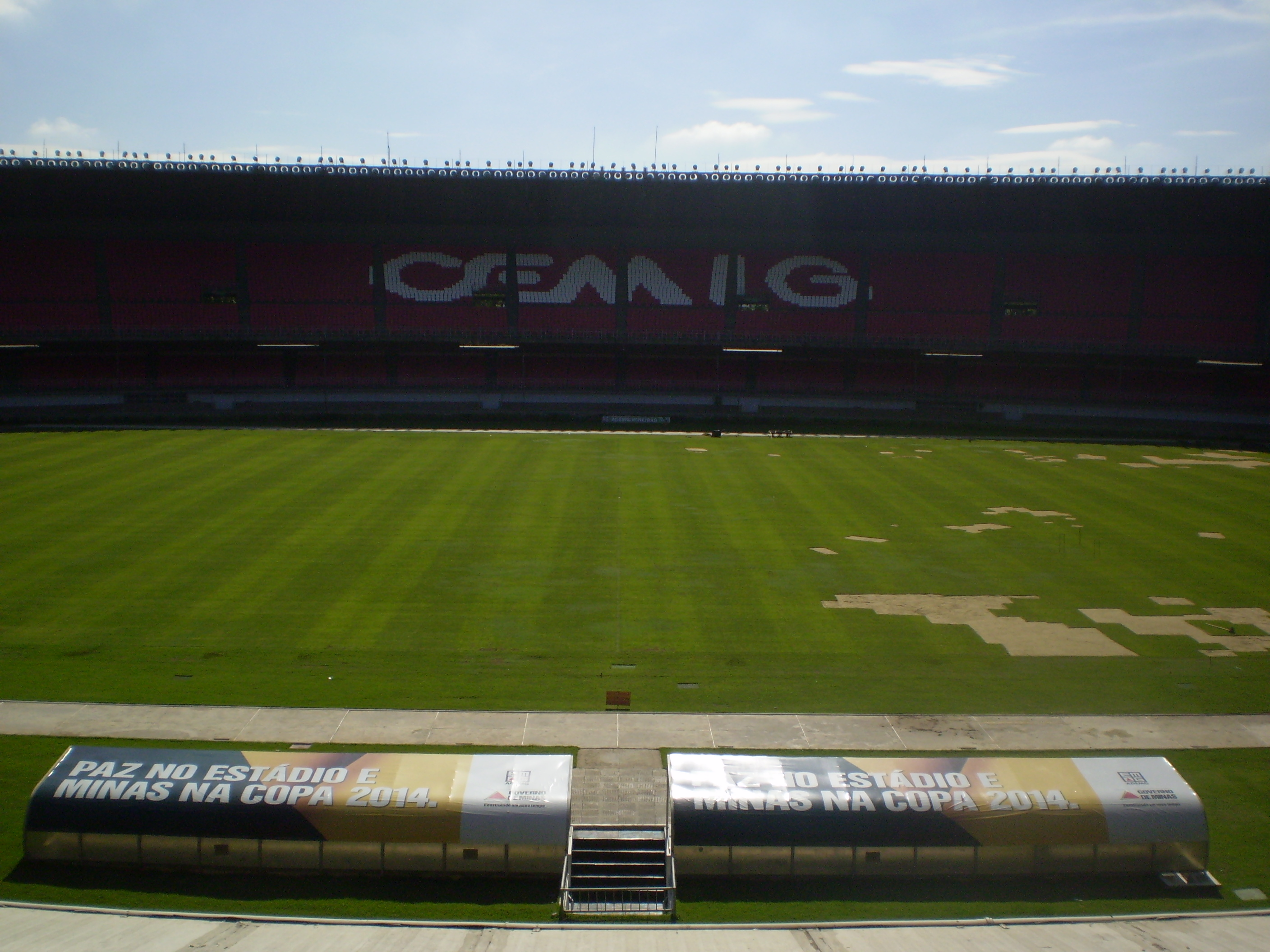
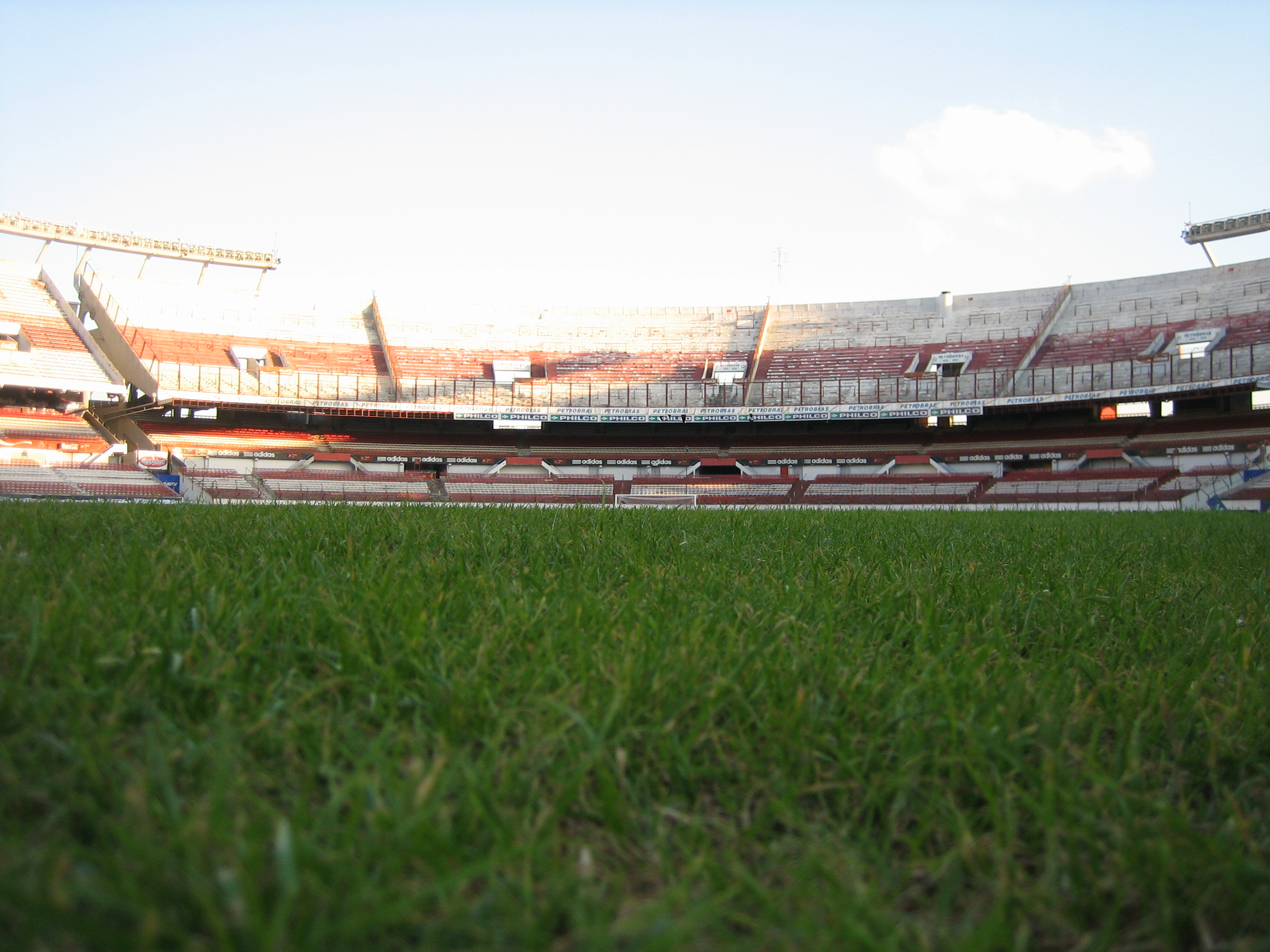
Mineirao (left) and Monumental, venues of the series

== Match details ==
=== First leg ===
August 3, 1999

Cruzeiro (Brazil)	2–0	(Argentina) River Plate
Müller 12'; Geovanni 88'	Report

Mineirão, Belo Horizonte
Attendance: 18,000
Referee: Jose Luís da Rosa (Uruguay)

**Cruzeiro**	**River Plate**

GK	1	(Brazil) André
DF	19	(Brazil) Donizete Amorim
DF	3	(Brazil) Marcelo Djian
DF	13	(Brazil) Márcio
DF	17	(Brazil) Tércio
MF	5	(Brazil) Donizete Oliveira	(yellow card) 85'
MF	20	(Brazil) Ricardinho
MF	10	(Brazil) Valdo	Red card
FW	7	(Brazil) Müller
FW	11	(Brazil) Alex Alves
FW	9	(Brazil) Marcelo Ramos		(substituted off) 68'
Substitutes:
GK	12	(Brazil) Maizena
DF	14	(Brazil) Gustavo
DF	23	(Brazil) Cris
MF	16	(Brazil) Geovanni		(substituted on) 68'
MF	18	(Brazil) Paulo Isidoro		(substituted on) 64'
MF	22	(Brazil) Leandro
FW	21	(Brazil) Túlio
Manager:
(Brazil) Levir Culpi

GK	1	(Argentina) Roberto Bonano
DF	19	(Uruguay) Leonardo Ramos
DF	2	(Argentina) Roberto Trotta
DF	6	(Paraguay) Pedro Sarabia
DF	3	(Argentina) Diego Placente
MF	23	(Argentina) Guillermo Pereyra	(yellow card) 33'
MF	16	(Argentina) Damián Álvarez		(substituted off) 80'
MF	24	(Argentina) Marcelo Gómez	(yellow card) 37'
FW	25	(Paraguay) Nelson Cuevas
FW	11	(Argentina) Martín Cardetti		(substituted off) 80'
FW	9	(Argentina) Sebastián Rambert		(substituted off) 55'
Substitutes:
GK	12	(Argentina) Alejandro Saccone
DF	13	(Argentina) Ariel Garcé
DF	14	(Argentina) Norberto Acosta
DF	15	(Argentina) Ariel Franco		(substituted on) 80'
MF	20	(Argentina) Leonel Gancedo	(yellow card) 81'	(substituted on) 55'
MF	22	(Argentina) Gabriel Pereyra
FW	18	(Argentina) Cristian Gastón Castillo		(substituted on) 80'
Manager:
(Argentina) Ramón Díaz

Assistant referees:
Saúl Feldmann (Uruguay)
William Martínez (Uruguay)

=== Second leg ===
September 26, 1999

River Plate (Argentina)	0–3	(Brazil) Cruzeiro
	Report	Geovanni 18'; Marcelo Ramos 82' (pen.); Gustavo 92'

Monumental, Buenos Aires
Attendance: 11,000
Referee: Ubaldo Aquino (Paraguay)

**River Plate**	**Cruzeiro**

GK	1	(Argentina) Roberto Bonano
DF	4	(Argentina) Gustavo Lombardi
DF	2	(Argentina) Roberto Trotta	Red card
DF	14	(Argentina) Norberto Acosta
DF	19	(Uruguay) Leonardo Ramos
MF	23	(Argentina) Guillermo Pereyra		(substituted off) 63'
MF	16	(Argentina) Damián Álvarez		(substituted off) 45'
MF	20	(Argentina) Leonel Gancedo	Red card
MF	8	(Argentina) Marcelo Escudero	(yellow card) 45'	(substituted off) 45'
FW	25	(Paraguay) Nelson Cuevas
FW	11	(Argentina) Martín Cardetti	(yellow card) 44'
Substitutes:
MF	24	(Argentina) Marcelo Gómez	(yellow card) 73'	(substituted on) 45'
FW	18	(Argentina) Cristian Castillo		(substituted on) 45'
DF	13	(Argentina) Ariel Garcé		(substituted on) 63'
GK	17	(Argentina) Franco Constanzo
DF	15	(Argentina) Ariel Franco
FW	22	(Argentina) Gabriel Pereyra
Manager:
(Argentina) Ramón Díaz

GK	1	(Brazil) André
DF	14	(Brazil) Gustavo
DF	3	(Brazil) Marcelo Djian
DF	23	(Brazil) Cris	Red card
DF	6	(Brazil) André Luiz
MF	15	(Brazil) Marcos Paulo
MF	20	(Brazil) Ricardinho	(yellow card) 64'
MF	19	(Brazil) Donizete Amorim		(substituted off) 68a'
FW	18	(Brazil) Paulo Isidoro
FW	16	(Brazil) Geovanni	(yellow card) 24'	(substituted off) 75'
FW	11	(Brazil) Alex Alves		(substituted off) 68b'
Substitutes:
MF	8	(Brazil) Djair		(substituted on) 68a'
DF	25	(Paraguay) Arnaldo Espínola		(substituted on) 68b'
FW	9	(Brazil) Marcelo Ramos		(substituted on) 75'
GK	12	(Brazil) Maizena
DF	4	(Brazil) Isaías
MF	5	(Brazil) Donizete Oliveira
FW	21	(Brazil) Túlio
Manager:
(Brazil) Levir Culpi

Assistant referees:
Robert Troxler Ayala (Paraguay)
Nelson Cano (Paraguay)
