= Levir Culpi =

Brazilian football player and manager

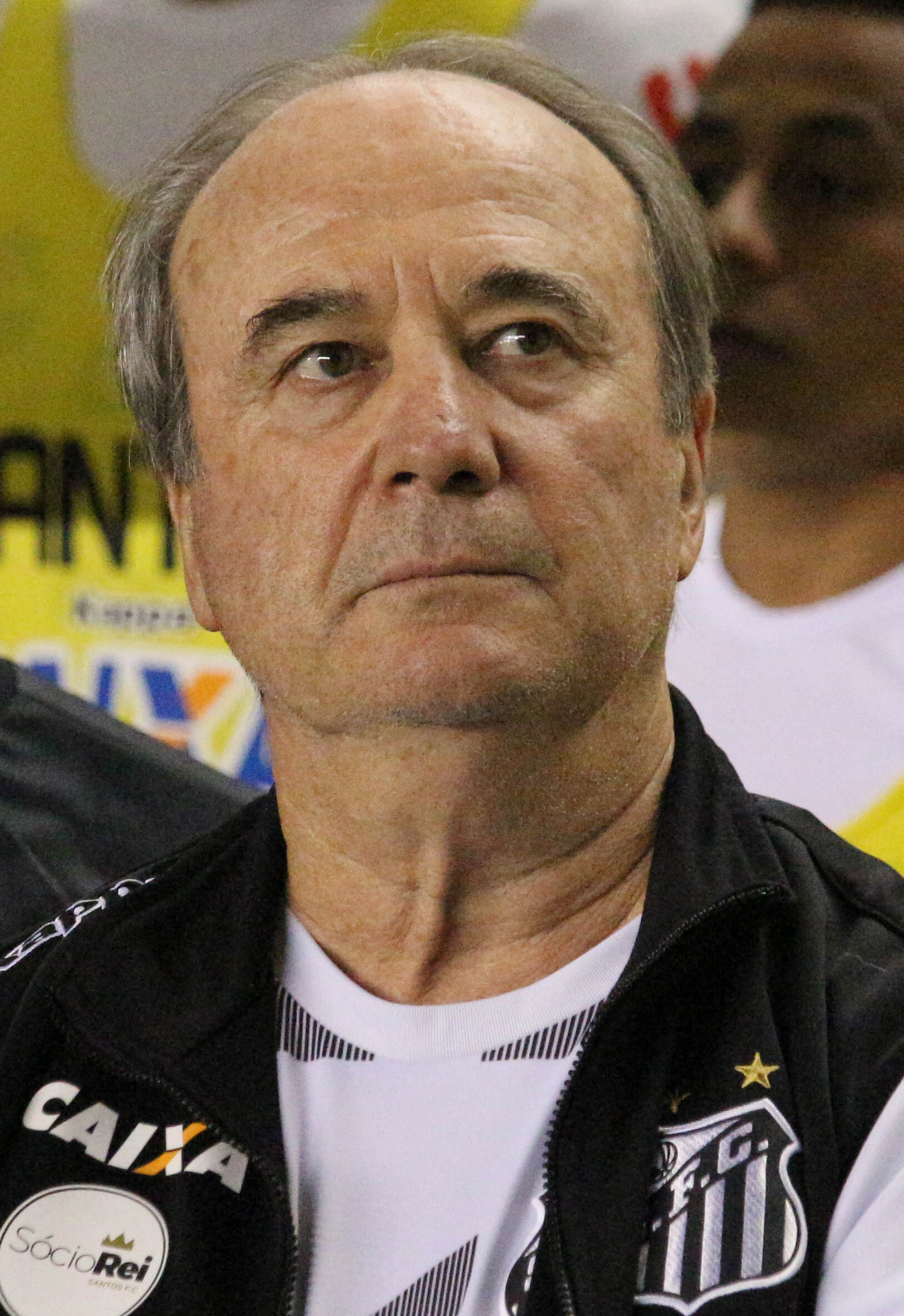
- Culpi in 2017

Personal information
- Full name: Levir Culpi
- Date of birth: 28 February 1953 (age 73)
- Place of birth: Curitiba, Brazil
- Position: Centre-back

Youth career
- Coritiba

Senior career*
Years	Team	Apps	(Gls)
1972–1973	Coritiba	20	(0)
1973	→ Botafogo (loan)	1	(0)
1974–1978	Santa Cruz	57	(0)
1978–1979	Colorado		
1979–1980	Atlante	32	(1)
1980	Vila Nova		
1980–1981	Colorado	5	(0)
1982–1983	Figueirense		
1984–1985	Juventude		

International career
1972	Brazil U20		

Managerial career
- 1986: Juventude
- 1986: Caxias
- 1986–1987: Atlético Paranaense
- 1988: Marcílio Dias
- 1988: Inter de Limeira
- 1989: Inter de Limeira
- 1989–1990: Criciúma
- 1990: Inter de Limeira
- 1991: Coritiba
- 1991: Inter de Limeira
- 1992: Criciúma
- 1992: Al-Ittifaq
- 1993: Paraná Clube
- 1994: Guarani
- 1994–1995: Atlético Mineiro
- 1995: Portuguesa
- 1996: Cruzeiro
- 1997: Cerezo Osaka
- 1998–1999: Cruzeiro
- 2000: São Paulo
- 2001: Sport
- 2001: Atlético Mineiro
- 2002: Palmeiras
- 2003–2004: Botafogo
- 2004: Atlético Paranaense
- 2005: Cruzeiro
- 2005: São Caetano
- 2006–2007: Atlético Mineiro
- 2007–2011: Cerezo Osaka
- 2012–2013: Cerezo Osaka
- 2014–2015: Atlético Mineiro
- 2016: Fluminense
- 2017: Santos
- 2018: Gamba Osaka
- 2018–2019: Atlético Mineiro
- 2021: Cerezo Osaka
- * Club domestic league appearances and goals

Levir Culpi (born 28 February 1953) is a Brazilian professional football coach and former player who played as a centre-back.

== Playing career ==
Known as Levir during his playing days, he was born in Curitiba, Paraná, and started his career with hometown club Coritiba, in 1972. After spending a six-month loan deal at Botafogo the following year, he signed for Santa Cruz in 1974.

Levir subsequently represented Colorado (two stints), Atlante, Vila Nova, Figueirense and Juventude, retiring with the latter in 1985.

== Coaching career ==
Immediately after retiring Culpi took up coaching, starting with his last club Juventude. After a stint at Caxias he was named Atlético Paranaense head coach in 1986, but left the club in the following year.

After a period in charge of Marcílio Dias, Culpi took Internacional de Limeira to their second national title, a Campeonato Brasileiro Série B in 1988. He subsequently managed Criciúma, Internacional and Coritiba before returning to Criciúma in 1992 and taking the club to the quarterfinals of the 1992 Copa Libertadores (being knocked out by eventual champions São Paulo).

In the following years Culpi rarely settled into a club, being in charge of Al-Ittifaq, Paraná Clube, Guarani, Atlético Mineiro, Portuguesa and Cruzeiro before moving abroad to manage Cerezo Osaka in 1997. He returned to Cruzeiro in 1998, notably winning the year's Recopa Sudamericana with a 5–0 aggregate success over River Plate.

In January 2000 Culpi took over São Paulo, but was sacked in November. After spells at Sport and Atlético Mineiro in 2001, he replaced Flávio Murtosa at the helm of Palmeiras on 3 September 2002, but could not avoid the club's first-ever relegation from the top tier.

In December 2002 Culpi was appointed head coach of Botafogo, taking the club back to the main category after finishing second. On 27 April 2004 he returned to Atlético Paranaense, after resigning with Bota.

Culpi again managed Cruzeiro during the 2005 campaign, but was relieved from his duties in July of that year. He subsequently managed São Caetano before achieving another promotion with Atlético Mineiro in 2006.

In May 2007, J. League Division 2 side Cerezo Osaka sacked Satoshi Tsunami and appointed Culpi as head coach. During his spell in charge of the team, he discovered Shinji Kagawa, who then played as a defensive midfielder, and used him as an attacking midfielder. Kagawa combined well with Takashi Inui, another talented young player, and the team under Culpi were promoted to the J. League Division 1 in 2010. He continued to display his ability to develop young players and construct an attacking team. With such players as Kagawa, Inui, Akihiro Ienaga, Hiroshi Kiyotake, Adriano, and Martinez, the team finished 3rd in 2010 and qualified for the AFC Champions League.

In November 2011, Culpi decided not to extend his contract, saying "I've come to the conclusion that now is the time to return to the far distant Brazil and spend time with my family." The following 26 August, however, he returned to the club after replacing compatriot Sérgio Soares.

In April 2014, Levir Culpi was announced as Atlético Mineiro coach for the fourth time in his career. He managed to perform a double in 2014, winning both the Recopa Sudamericana and the Copa do Brasil. In 2015, in the first official match of the season, Atlético defeated Tupi 2-0 and he reached his 228th match ahead of the team, becoming the third coach with more games for the club, only behind Telê Santana (434), and Procópio Cardoso (328).

On 3 May 2015, Culpi lifted the Campeonato Mineiro trophy for the fifth time in his career, becoming the fifth coach to do so. He left Atlético Mineiro on 26 November, exactly one year after winning the Copa do Brasil. He was dismissed after a total of 288 matches, with 154 wins, 60 draws and 74 defeats, with 493 goals scored 184 goals conceded.

On 4 March 2016, Culpi was announced as new coach of Fluminense. He won the inaugural Primeira Liga, but was relieved from his duties on 6 November.

On 6 June 2017, Culpi agreed to a six-month contract with Santos, replacing fired Dorival Júnior. On 28 October, he was himself dismissed after a 2–1 loss against São Paulo.

On 17 October 2018, Culpi returned to Galo for his fifth spell, replacing dismissed Thiago Larghi. He was sacked the following 11 April, after a 4–1 loss against Cerro Porteño.

== Coaching statistics ==
Team	From	To	Record					Refs
Team	From	To	G	W	D	L	Win %	Refs
Cerezo Osaka	1 February 1997	31 December 1997	40	21	5	14	52.50	
Cerezo Osaka	2007	2011	196	100	42	54	51.02	
Cerezo Osaka	2012	2013	45	20	15	10	44.44	
Fluminense	4 March 2016	6 November 2016	52	22	15	15	42.31	
Gamba Osaka	2018	2018	26	9	3	14	34.62	
Cerezo Osaka	2021	2021	32	14	10	8	43.75	
Total			422	200	102	120	47.39	

== Honours ==
=== Player ===
Coritiba

- Campeonato Paranaense: 1973

Santa Cruz

- Campeonato Pernambucano: 1976

=== Manager ===
Inter de Limeira

- Campeonato Brasileiro Série B: 1988

Criciúma

- Campeonato Catarinense: 1989

Paraná

- Campeonato Paranaense: 1993

Cruzeiro

- Copa do Brasil: 1996
- Campeonato Mineiro: 1996, 1998
- Recopa Sudamericana: 1998
- Copa Centro-Oeste: 1999

São Paulo

- Campeonato Paulista: 2000

Atlético Mineiro

- Campeonato Mineiro: 1995, 2007, 2015
- Campeonato Brasileiro Série B: 2006
- Recopa Sudamericana: 2014
- Copa do Brasil: 2014

Fluminense

- Primeira Liga: 2016

== See also ==
- List of football managers with the most matches
