= Dendi =

Dendi is the name of several African-related subjects:

- Dendi (province)
- Dendi (woreda) is a district or woreda in Ethiopia;
- Mount Dendi, also in Ethiopia;
- Dendi people is one of the ethnic groups living in Benin and Niger;
  - Dendi language (one of the Songhay languages) is spoken by this people.

== People with the name Dendi ==
- Dendi (gamer), real name Danil Ishutin, Ukrainian esports player
- Clotardo Dendi, South American footballer
- Dendi Santoso, Indonesian footballer
