= Cocimano =

Cocimano is an Italian surname. Notable people with the surname include:

- Rubén Oscar Cocimano (born 1962), Argentine retired professional footballer
- Sebastián Cocimano (born 2000), Argentine professional footballer
