= Maizena (footballer) =

Brazilian footballer

Personal information
- Full name: Geraldo Carlos Burile
- Date of birth: 22 October 1967 (age 59)
- Place of birth: Dois Vizinhos, Brazil
- Position: Goalkeeper

Youth career
- Cascavel EC

Senior career*
Years	Team	Apps	(Gls)
1988	Cascavel EC		
1989	São Paulo	3	(0)
1989	Criciúma		
1990–1992	Internacional		
1993–1994	Ituano		
1994–1995	União São João		
1995–1997	Corinthians	0	(0)
1996–1997	→ Santo André (loan)		
1997	XV de Piracicaba		
1998	Araçatuba		
1998	Moto Club		
1998	Fortaleza		
1998	XV de Piracicaba		
1999	Toluca		
1999	Fortaleza		
1999	Cruzeiro		
2000–2002	Fortaleza		
2002–2005	Sport Recife		
2006	Fortaleza		
2006	CRB		
- * Club domestic league appearances and goals

Geraldo Carlos Burile (born 22 October 1967), better known as Maizena, is a Brazilian former professional footballer who played as a goalkeeper.

== Career ==
Maizena began his career at Cascavel EC in 1988, and in 1989 he was part of the state champion squad in São Paulo for São Paulo FC and in Santa Catarina for Criciúma. At Internacional, he played from 1990 to 1992 and won the 1991 Campeonato Gaúcho and Copa Governador do Estado titles.

He played for several teams in the state of São Paulo in the 1990s, until in 1999 he was traded to Toluca, where he was a reserve in the 1999 title. He was also champion of the Copa Centro-Oeste with Cruzeiro, and then, he arrived at Fortaleza, a club with greatest identification in his career, where he was state champion twice in 2000 and 2001. Also played for Sport Recife where he was Pernambuco champion in 2003, and ended his career at CRB in 2006.

== Honours ==
São Paulo

- Campeonato Paulista: 1989

Criciúma

- Campeonato Catarinense: 1989

Internacional

- Campeonato Gaúcho: 1991
- Copa Governador do Estado: 1991

Toluca

- Primera División de México: 1999 (Verano)

Cruzeiro

- Copa Centro-Oeste: 1999
- Recopa Sudamericana: 1998

Fortaleza

- Campeonato Cearense: 2000, 2001

Sport

- Campeonato Pernambucano: 2003
