= Boavista Sport Club =

Boavista
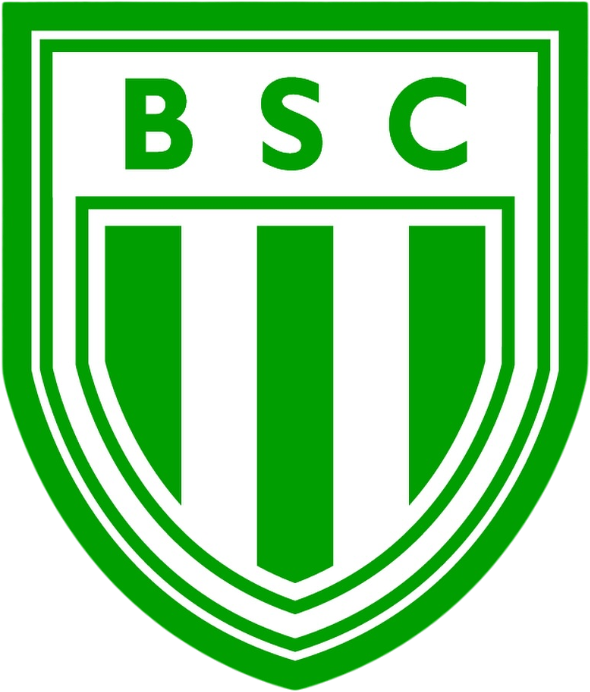
- Full name: Boavista Sport Club
- Nickname: Verdão de Saquarema (Big Green of Saquarema)
- Founded: October 14, 1961 (65 years ago), as Esporte Clube Barreira; March 10, 2004 (22 years ago), as Boavista Sport Club
- Ground: Estádio Elcyr Resende de Mendonça
- Capacity: 6,000
- Head coach: Leandrão
- League: Campeonato Carioca
- 2025 2025: Série D, 60th of 64; Carioca, 8th of 12
- Website: www.boavistasc.com.br
Home colours	Away colours	Third colours

Boavista Sport Club, commonly known as Boavista, is a Brazilian professional football club in Saquarema, Rio de Janeiro. The team competes in the Campeonato Carioca, the top tier of the Rio de Janeiro state football league, and the Campeonato Brasileiro Série D. The club was formerly known as Esporte Clube Barreira.

== History ==
Esporte Clube Barreira's logo, used from 1961 until 2004

Boavista Sport Club's logo, used from 2004 until 2024

=== Barreira ===
On October 14, 1961, the club was founded as Esporte Clube Barreira.

In 1991, EC Barreira won the Campeonato Carioca Terceira Divisão (Campeonato Carioca Third Division), after beating Bayer of Belford Roxo city. Both clubs were promoted to the following year's Segunda Divisão (Second Division).

In 1992, the club finished as the Segunda Divisão's runner-up, only behind Bayer, and was not promoted to the first division.

In 1995, the club played in the Campeonato Carioca's top level for the first time in history. The club finished in the 6th position of its group, so, Barreira failed to qualify to the second phase, but also avoided the relegation tournament. In the first phase's first stage the club finished in the 6th position, and in the second stage the club finished in the 7th position.

In 1996, the club again played in the Campeonato Carioca. Barreira finished in the 10th position in Taça Guanabara (which is the competition's first stage), and in the 11th position in Taça Rio (the competition's second stage).

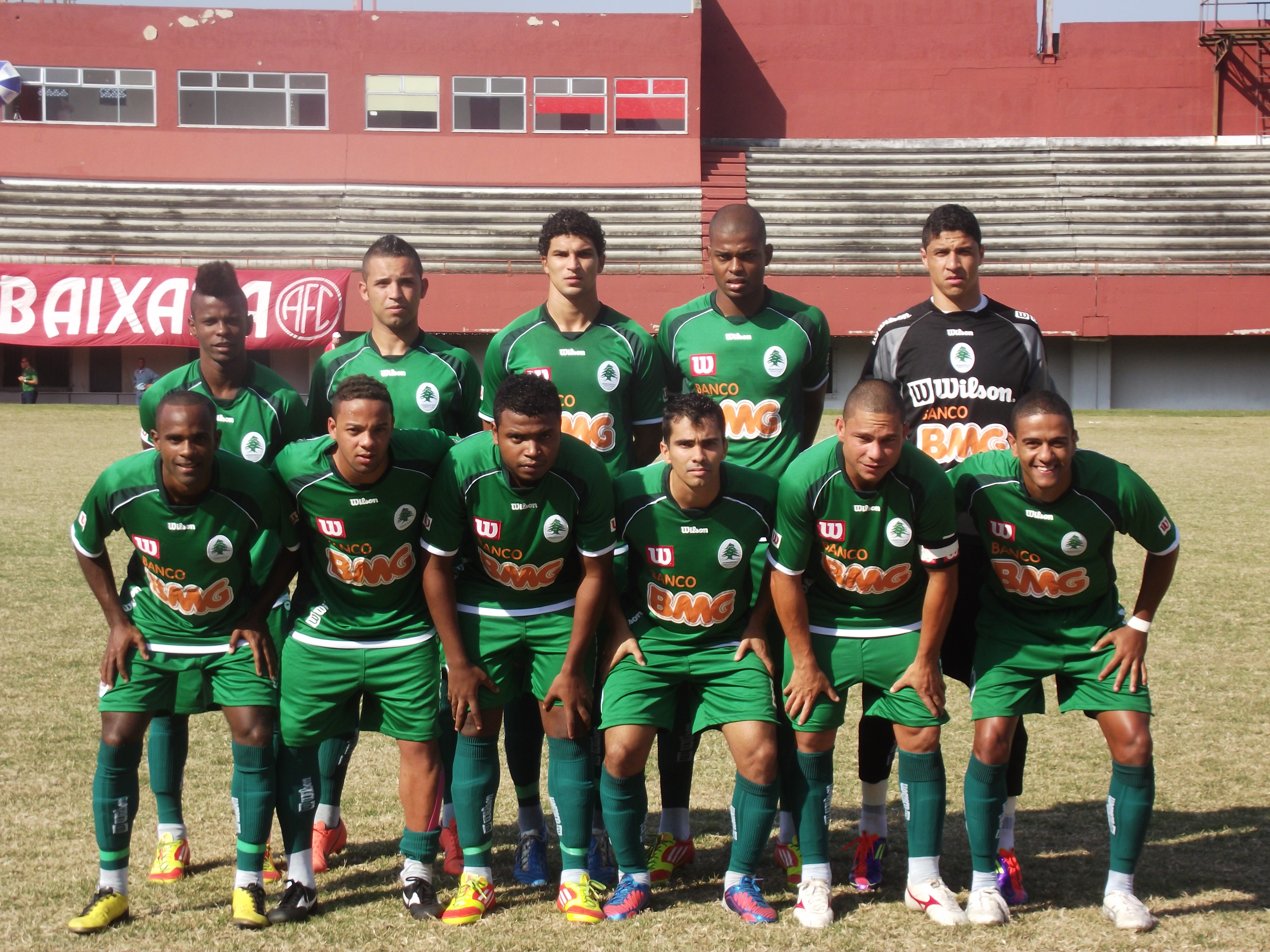
Team photo from the 2012 season

In 1997, Barreira finished 12th in Taça Guanabara (last place), so the club was relegated and did not play in Taça Rio.

=== Boavista ===
On March 10, 2004, a group of businessmen assumed the club's control, and renamed the club to its current name, Boavista Sport Club. The club's logo was also changed. However, the colors remained the same.

In 2006, the club won its first title as Boavista, the Campeonato Carioca Segunda Divisão, being promoted to the following year's first division. In the final, the club beat Macaé Esporte. In the first leg, on June 25, 2006, Boavista won 2–1, at Estádio Cláudio Moacyr Azevedo, Macaé city. On July 2, 2006, at Estádio Eucy de Resende Mendonça, Boavista and Macaé drew 0–0.

== Honours ==
=== Official tournaments ===
State
Competitions	Titles	Seasons
Copa Rio	2	2017, 2026
Campeonato Carioca Série A2	1	2006
Campeonato Carioca Série B1	1	1991

=== Others tournaments ===
==== State ====
- Taça Rio (1): 2014
- Torneio Extra (1): 2013

=== Runners-up ===
- Copa Rio (1): 2013
- Campeonato Carioca Série A2 (2): 1992, 2004

== Kit manufacturer and shirt sponsors ==
Period	Kit manufacturer	Main sponsor
2012	Wilson	Banco BMG
2013	Wilson	Ze Luca
2014	Kappa	Stella Barros
2015	Kappa	Gomes Supermercados
2016	Umbro	Stella Barros
2017	Umbro	None
2018	Umbro	Stella Barros
2019	Super Bolla	JJ Invest
2020–	Icone	Contrate Artistas

== Current squad ==
As of March 31, 2021

Note: Flags indicate national team as defined under FIFA eligibility rules; some limited exceptions apply. Players may hold more than one non-FIFA nationality.

No.	Pos.	Nation	Player
—	GK	BRA	Kléver
—	GK	BRA	Ary
—	GK	BRA	Rafael Copetti
—	GK	BRA	Luan Vítor
—	DF	BRA	Gustavo
—	DF	BRA	Luiz Fernando
—	DF	BRA	Elivelton
—	DF	BRA	Victor Pereira
—	DF	BRA	Glaubinho
—	DF	BRA	Wisney
—	DF	BRA	Gabriel Cassimiro
—	DF	BRA	Guilherme
—	MF	BRA	Fernando Bob
—	MF	BRA	Ryan
—	MF	BRA	Thiaguinho
—	MF	BRA	Igor César
—	MF	BRA	Jucilei

No.	Pos.	Nation	Player
—	MF	BRA	Douglas Pedroso
—	MF	BRA	Ganso
—	MF	BRA	Caio Felipe
—	MF	BRA	Ralph
—	MF	BRA	Bernardo
—	MF	BRA	Jefferson Renan
—	MF	BRA	Rael
—	MF	BRA	João Pedro
—	MF	BRA	Luiz Felipe
—	MF	BRA	Alex Pixote
—	FW	BRA	Felipe Augusto
—	FW	BRA	Luis Felipe
—	FW	BRA	Michel Douglas
—	FW	BRA	Marquinho
—	FW	BRA	Magrão
—	FW	BRA	Erick Flores
—	FW	ARG	Thiago Acosta

=== Out on loan ===
Note: Flags indicate national team as defined under FIFA eligibility rules; some limited exceptions apply. Players may hold more than one non-FIFA nationality.

No.	Pos.	Nation	Player
—	FW	BRA	Dija Baiano (on loan to Treze)

=== First-team staff ===
Position	Name	Nationality
Head coach	Leandrão	Brazilian

== Stadium ==
The club's home matches are usually played at Estádio Elcyr Resende de Mendonça, which has a maximum capacity of 10,000 people.

== Club colors ==
The club's colors are green, and white.

== Mascot ==
Boavista's mascot is a firefly.
