= Donizete Amorim =

Brazilian footballer (born 1976)

Personal information
- Full name: Anderson Leal de Amorim
- Date of birth: 22 January 1976 (age 50)
- Place of birth: Belo Horizonte, Brazil
- Position: Defensive midfielder

Youth career
- Cruzeiro

Senior career*
Years	Team	Apps	(Gls)
1993–2000	Cruzeiro	93	(5)
1996	→ Mamoré (loan)		
1996	→ Vitória (loan)		
1998	→ Vitória (loan)		
2000	Fluminense		
2001	Atlético Paranaense		
2001–2002	Santa Cruz		
2002	Atlético Paranaense		
2003	Sporting Cristal		
2003–2004	Juventude		
2005	Paysandu		
2005	Vitória		
2006	Vila Nova		
2006	Villa Nova		
2006–2007	América-MG		
2007	Ituano		
2008	Bacabal		

Managerial career
- 2014: Araxá
- * Club domestic league appearances and goals

Anderson Leal de Amorim (born 2 January 1976), better known as Donizete Amorim, is a Brazilian former professional footballer who played as a defensive midfielder.

== Career ==
Formed at Cruzeiro, Donizete Amorim was part of the winning squad of the 1997 Copa Libertadores. He also played and was champion for Atlético Paranaense, Sporting Cristal, Paysandu and Bacabal, his last club. In 2014 he became a coach directing Araxá.

In 2025, Amorim worked as football director at North EC.

== Honours ==
Cruzeiro

- Copa Libertadores: 1997
- Recopa Sudamericana: 1998
- Campeonato Mineiro: 1996, 1997

Athletico Paranaense

- Campeonato Paranaense: 2001

Sporting Cristal

- Peruvian Primera División: 2003 Apertura

Paysandu

- Campeonato Paraense: 2005

Bacabal

- Taça Cidade de São Luís: 2008
