= Jorge Balbis =

Argentinian footballer (born 1961)

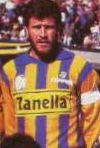

Personal information
- Full name: Jorge Raúl Balbis
- Date of birth: 25 September 1961 (age 65)
- Place of birth: Argentina
- Position: Defender

Senior career*
Years	Team	Apps	(Gls)
1983–1985	Rosario Central		
1986	Platense	13	(0)
1986–1987	Rosario Central		
1988–1989	Santa Fe		
1989–1992	América		
1992	River	10	(0)
1993–1995	Rosario Central		
- * Club domestic league appearances and goals

Jorge Raúl Balbis (born 25 September 1961) is an Argentine former professional footballer who played as a defender.

== Career ==
In 1989, Balbis signed for Colombian side América, becoming an instrumental part in helping them win the 1990 league title, despite spending a lot of the previous season injured. He was regarded as one of the best defenders in the history of the club. In total, he played for the club for three seasons.

== Style of play ==
Balbis mainly operated as a central defender.
