= André Doring =

Brazilian footballer (born 1972)

André Döring
Personal information
- Full name: André Döring
- Date of birth: July 25, 1972 (age 54)
- Place of birth: Venâncio Aires, Brazil
- Height: 1.84 m (6 ft 1/2 in)
- Position: Goalkeeper

Youth career
- 1989–1991: SC Internacional

Senior career*
Years	Team	Apps	(Gls)
1992–1999	SC Internacional	95	(0)
1999–2003	Cruzeiro	58	(0)
2003–2005	SC Internacional	14	(0)
2006–2008	Juventude	39	(0)

International career
1998	Brazil	1	(0)

Managerial career
- 2011: SC Internacional (caretaker)
- * Club domestic league appearances and goals

André Döring, is a former Brazilian footballer who played as a goalkeeper. He was born in Venâncio Aires, Rio Grande do Sul, on June 25, 1972. He currently works as assistant coach in Sport Club Internacional B.

He made a single appearance for Brazil in a friendly match against Yugoslavia in 1998.

== Honours ==
- Rio Grande do Sul State Championship: 1991, 1992, 1994, 1997, 2004, 2005.
- Minas Gerais State Championship: 2003.
- Minas-South Cup: 2001.
- Brazilian Cup: 1992, 2000, 2003.
- Brazilian Championship: 2003
