= 1988 Campeonato Brasileiro Série B =

Campeonato Brasileiro Série B
- Season: 1988
- Champions: Inter de Limeira (1st title)
- Promoted: Inter de Limeira; Náutico
- Biggest home win: Inter de Limeira 5-1 Atlético Goianiense (November 12, 1988)
- Biggest away win: Londrina 1-4 Joinville (October 23, 1988)

The 1988 Campeonato Brasileiro Série B was the 10th edition of the Campeonato Brasileiro Série B. The championship was disputed by 24 clubs divided into four groups of six teams. The four top teams in each group would qualify for the second phase, formed by 16 teams divided into four groups. The top two placed teams in each group would qualify, and the same process would repeat in the next phases, also divided into groupus of four. as in the first level, wins were worth three points, and any match that ended tied went to penalties, with the winner of the penalty shootout gaining two points and the loser one point. The champion and the runner-up would qualify to the finals and be promoted to the 1989 Série A. Inter de Limeira came in first in the final group, with Ponte Preta coming in second. However, since the tiebreaking criteria were unclear, Náutico contested Ponte Preta's promotion, claiming that the first tiebreaking criterion was the number of wins in the whole tournament and not the number of wins in the final phase. CBF decided to award the promotion and spot in the finals to Náutico. Inter de Limeira eventually beat Náutico in the finals.

== First phase ==
=== Group C ===
Pos	Team	Pld	W	PKW	PKL	L	GF	GA	GD	Pts
1	(Pernambuco) Náutico	10	6	1	1	2	12	5	+7	21
2	(Bahia) Fluminense de Feira	10	4	3	3	0	10	4	+6	21
3	(Bahia) Catuense	10	4	2	2	2	15	12	+3	18
4	Ceará	10	2	2	1	5	6	12	−6	11
5	(Pernambuco) Central	10	1	3	2	4	3	8	−5	11
6	(Paraíba) Treze	10	1	1	3	5	7	12	−5	8

Source: rssfbrasil.com

=== Group D ===
Pos	Team	Pld	W	PKW	PKL	L	GF	GA	GD	Pts
1	(São Paulo (state)) Ponte Preta	10	4	2	2	2	13	7	+6	18
2	(Rio de Janeiro (state)) Americano	10	4	1	4	1	14	9	+5	18
3	(Minas Gerais) América Mineiro	10	4	2	2	2	10	6	+4	18
4	(Minas Gerais) Valeriodoce	10	4	2	1	3	12	10	+2	17
5	(São Paulo (state)) Juventus	10	2	2	2	4	9	9	0	12
6	(Espírito Santo) Rio Branco-ES	10	1	2	0	7	6	23	−17	7

Source: rssfbrasil.com

=== Group E ===
Pos	Team	Pld	W	PKW	PKL	L	GF	GA	GD	Pts
1	(São Paulo (state)) Inter de Limeira	10	5	3	1	1	11	6	+5	22
2	(São Paulo (state)) Botafogo-SP	10	4	1	2	3	10	8	+2	16
3	(Goiás) Atlético Goianiense	10	4	0	3	3	17	13	+4	15
4	(Mato Grosso do Sul) Operário-MS	10	3	2	2	3	14	13	+1	15
5	(Paraná (state)) Grêmio Maringá	10	3	2	1	4	7	13	−6	14
6	(Minas Gerais) Uberlândia	10	1	2	1	6	9	15	−6	8

Source: rssfbrasil.com

=== Group F ===
Pos	Team	Pld	W	PKW	PKL	L	GF	GA	GD	Pts
1	(Santa Catarina (state)) Joinville	10	4	4	2	0	16	9	+7	22
2	(Rio Grande do Sul) Caxias	10	4	2	2	2	13	11	+2	18
3	(Santa Catarina (state)) Avaí	10	3	1	4	2	10	6	+4	15
4	(Rio Grande do Sul) Juventude	10	3	2	0	5	6	10	−4	13
5	(Paraná (state)) Londrina	10	3	1	1	5	8	13	−5	12
6	(Rio Grande do Sul) Pelotas	10	2	1	2	5	8	12	−4	10

Source: rssfbrasil.com

== Second phase ==
=== Group G ===
Pos	Team	Pld	W	PKW	PKL	L	GF	GA	GD	Pts
1	(Mato Grosso do Sul) Operário-MS	9	5	0	0	4	9	4	+5	15
2	(Rio Grande do Sul) Caxias	6	4	0	1	1	10	4	+6	13
3	(São Paulo (state)) Botafogo-SP	6	1	1	1	3	5	7	−2	6
4	(Rio Grande do Sul) Juventude	6	0	1	0	5	2	11	−9	2

Source: rssfbrasil.com

=== Group H ===
Pos	Team	Pld	W	PKW	PKL	L	GF	GA	GD	Pts
1	(São Paulo (state)) Inter de Limeira	6	4	1	0	1	11	6	+5	14
2	(Santa Catarina (state)) Joinville	6	3	0	1	2	5	4	+1	10
3	(Goiás) Atlético Goianiense	6	2	0	0	4	6	10	−4	6
4	(Santa Catarina (state)) Avaí	6	2	0	0	4	8	10	−2	6

Source: rssfbrasil.com

=== Group I ===
Pos	Team	Pld	W	PKW	PKL	L	GF	GA	GD	Pts
1	(São Paulo (state)) Ponte Preta	4	3	0	0	1	5	3	+2	9
2	(Rio de Janeiro (state)) Americano	4	2	0	0	2	3	3	0	6
3	(Bahia) Fluminense de Feira	4	1	0	0	3	2	4	−2	3
4	Ceará	0	0	0	0	0	0	0	0	0

Source: rssfbrasil.com

=== Group J ===
Pos	Team	Pld	W	PKW	PKL	L	GF	GA	GD	Pts
1	(Pernambuco) Náutico	6	4	0	1	1	9	7	+2	13
2	(Minas Gerais) Valeriodoce	6	3	2	0	1	7	5	+2	13
3	(Minas Gerais) América Mineiro	6	3	0	0	3	7	4	+3	9
4	(Bahia) Catuense	6	0	0	1	5	4	11	−7	1

Source: rssfbrasil.com

== Third phase ==
=== Group K ===
Pos	Team	Pld	W	PKW	PKL	L	GF	GA	GD	Pts
1	(São Paulo (state)) Inter de Limeira	6	4	1	1	0	15	6	+9	15
2	(Pernambuco) Náutico	6	3	2	0	1	11	8	+3	13
3	(Minas Gerais) Valeriodoce	6	1	0	1	4	9	13	−4	4
4	(Mato Grosso do Sul) Operário-MS	6	0	1	2	3	3	11	−8	4

Source: rssfbrasil.com

=== Group L ===
Pos	Team	Pld	W	PKW	PKL	L	GF	GA	GD	Pts
1	(Rio de Janeiro (state)) Americano	6	3	0	2	1	6	6	0	11
2	(São Paulo (state)) Ponte Preta	6	2	2	0	2	8	6	+2	10
3	(Santa Catarina (state)) Joinville	6	2	1	1	2	6	7	−1	9
4	(Rio Grande do Sul) Caxias	6	2	0	0	4	8	9	−1	6

Source: rssfbrasil.com

== Final group ==
Pos	Team	Pld	W	PKW	PKL	L	GF	GA	GD	Pts
1	(São Paulo (state)) Inter de Limeira	6	2	3	0	1	7	6	+1	12
2	(Pernambuco) Náutico	6	2	2	1	1	6	5	+1	11
3	(São Paulo (state)) Ponte Preta	6	3	0	2	1	10	6	+4	11
4	(Rio de Janeiro (state)) Americano	6	0	0	2	4	2	8	−6	2

Source: rssfbrasil.com

== Finals ==
February 11, 1989

Inter de Limeira	2–1	Náutico

Limeirão

== Sources ==
- "Brazil Second Level 1988". rsssfbrasil.com.
