= Thiago Acosta =

Argentine footballer (born 2005)

Personal information
- Full name: Thiago Martín Acosta
- Date of birth: 25 February 2005 (age 21)
- Place of birth: Buenos Aires
- Height: 1.83 m (6 ft 0 in)
- Position: Attacking midfielder

Team information
- Current team: Boavista Sport Club

Youth career
- San José Obrero
- Juventud de Villa Giardino
- 2016–2026: River Plate

Senior career*
Years	Team	Apps	(Gls)
2025–2026	River Plate	4	(0)
2026–	Boavista	0	(0)
- * Club domestic league appearances and goals

Thiago Martín Acosta (born 25 February 2005) is an Argentine professional association football player who plays as an attacking midfielder for Campeonato Carioca club Boavista Sport Club.

== Club career ==
=== Early career ===
Acosta was born on 25 February 2005 on Buenos Aires, Argentina. He developed his football skills at the clubs San José Obrero and Juventud de Villa Giardino. In 2016, he joined River Plate's youth academy. He progressed from the fifth division to River's reserve squad, where he wore the number 10.

=== River Plate ===
Acosta made his official debut on September 20, 2025, in a 2–0 defeat against Atlético Tucumán. Replacing Agustín de la Cuesta in the 60th minute, playing the final half hour. He was the 48th youth player on debut under the management of Marcelo Gallardo.

Acosta was a starting player for the first time in the 0–1 defeat against Sarmiento de Junín, and repeated his starting role in the 3–2 defeat against Racing Club in the Round of 16 of 2025 Torneo Clausura.

=== Boavista ===
After being sidelined following his performance in the reserve team's final against Racing Club, the midfielder terminated his contract with River Plate; although he departed as a free agent, the club retains a 20% stake in any future sale.
