= Ascanio Cortés =

Chilean footballer (1914-1998)

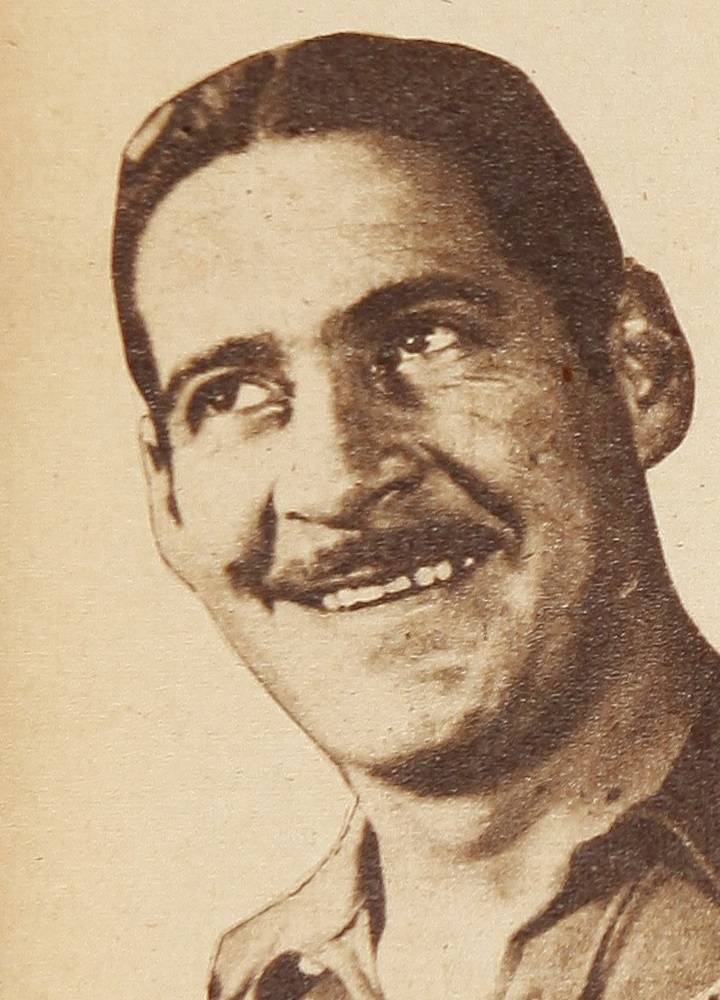
- Cortés in 1943

Personal information
- Full name: Ascanio Cortés Torres
- Date of birth: 5 July 1914
- Place of birth: Tocopilla, Chile
- Date of death: 7 February 1998 (aged 83)
- Position: Defender

Youth career
- Esparta Tocopilla

Senior career*
Years	Team	Apps	(Gls)
1930	Tocopilla (city team)		
1932	Sporting Tocopilla		
1933	María Elena (city team)		
1934–1938	Audax Italiano		
1939	River Plate	11	(0)
1940–1942	Audax Italiano		
1943–1946	Santiago National		

International career
1935–1941	Chile	13	(0)
- * Club domestic league appearances and goals

Ascanio Cortés Torres (5 July 1914 – 7 February 1998) was a Chilean footballer. He played in 13 matches for the Chile national football team from 1935 to 1941. He was also part of Chile's squad for the 1935 South American Championship.

== Club career ==
Born in Tocopilla, Chile, Cortés was with club Esparta before joining Sporting Tocopilla in 1932. He also represented the city teams of Tocopilla and María Elena. Cortés made his professional debut as a forward for Audax Italiano, aged 20, becoming a defender later. A historical player for them, he moved to Argentina and signed with River Plate in 1939. For River Plate, he made eleven appearances and was known for making the bicycle kick or chilena.

Back in Chile, Cortés rejoined Audax Italiano until 1942. His last club was Santiago National.
