= Rubén Cocimano =

Argentine footballer

Personal information
- Full name: Rubén Oscar Cocimano Rubini
- Date of birth: 5 February 1962 (age 64)
- Place of birth: Quilmes, Argentina
- Position: Midfielder

Youth career
- 1981–1982: River Plate

Senior career*
Years	Team	Apps	(Gls)
1982–1983	River Plate	18	(0)
1984	Atlanta	26	(1)
1985–1986	LDU Portoviejo		
1986–1989	Atlético Tucumán		
1989–1990	LDU Portoviejo		
1990–1991	Deportivo Cuenca		
1991	Audaz Octubrino		
1992–1993	Nueva Chicago		
1993–1994	Defensa y Justicia		
- * Club domestic league appearances and goals

Rubén Oscar Cocimano (born 5 February 1962 in Quilmes) is an Argentine retired football player.

== Club career ==
Cocimano played for River Plate and Atlanta in the Primera División Argentina. He also spent several seasons with LDU Portoviejo and Deportivo Cuenca in Serie A de Ecuador.

== See also ==
- Football in Argentina
- List of football clubs in Argentina
