= Norberto Acosta =

Argentine footballer

Personal information
- Full name: Norberto Raúl Acosta
- Date of birth: 22 May 1976 (age 50)
- Place of birth: Salta, Argentina
- Height: 1.70 m (5 ft 7 in)
- Position: Left-back

Youth career
- San Martín Salta
- River Plate

Senior career*
Years	Team	Apps	(Gls)
1998–2001	River Plate	11	(0)
2000–2001	→ Instituto (loan)		
2002	Santiago Wanderers	1	(0)
2002	Instituto		
2003–2004	Defensores de Belgrano	29	(0)
2004–2006	Platense	67	(1)
2006-2011	Juventud Unida (G)	113	(1)

Managerial career
- 2011–2016: Juventud Unida (G)
- 2017: Central Norte
- 2018: Gimnasia CdU
- 2019–2020: Chaco For Ever
- 2020–2022: Juventud Unida (G)
- 2022: Deportivo Urdinarrain
- 2023: Gimnasia CdU
- * Club domestic league appearances and goals

Norberto Raúl Acosta (born May 22, 1976, in Buenos Aires, Argentina) is an Argentine football manager and former footballer.

== Teams ==
- (Argentina) River Plate 1998–2000
- (Argentina) Instituto 2000–2001
- (Argentina) River Plate 2001
- (Chile) Santiago Wanderers 2002
- (Argentina) Instituto 2002
- (Argentina) Defensores de Belgrano 2003–2004
- (Argentina) Platense 2004–2006
- (Argentina) Juventud Unida de Gualeguaychú 2006–2011
