= Clotardo Dendi =

Uruguayan footballer

Personal information
- Date of birth: 26 May 1906
- Position: Forward

Senior career*
Years	Team	Apps	(Gls)
1920–1931	Montevideo Wanderers F.C.		
1931	San Lorenzo	1	(0)
1931	Gimnasia y Esgrima	2	(0)
1932–1933	Lanús	56	(30)
1933–1934	River Plate	2	(0)
1934–1935	Atlanta	9	(3)
- * Club domestic league appearances and goals

Clotardo Dendi (born 26 May 1906, date of death unknown) was a Paraguayan and naturalized Uruguayan association football forward who played for clubs of Uruguay and Argentina. He was born in Asunción, Paraguay.

== Teams ==
- (Uruguay) Montevideo Wanderers 1920-1931
- (Argentina) San Lorenzo 1931
- (Argentina) Gimnasia y Esgrima de La Plata 1931
- (Argentina) Lanús 1932-1933
- (Argentina) River Plate 1933-1934
- (Argentina) Atlanta 1934-1935
