= 2019–20 Gimnasia y Esgrima de Jujuy season =

Gimnasia y Esgrima
2019–20 season
- President: Fernando Yecora
- Manager: Marcelo Herrera
- Stadium: Estadio 23 de Agosto
- Top goalscorer: League: Gonzalo Castillejos (2); Matías Córdoba; All: Gonzalo Castillejos (2); Matías Córdoba

The 2019–20 season was Gimnasia y Esgrima's 12th consecutive season in the second division of Argentine football, Primera B Nacional.

The season generally covers the period from 1 July 2019 to 30 June 2020.

== Review ==
=== Pre-season ===
Nicolás Caro sealed a departure from Gimnasia to Atlanta on 17 June 2019. Carlos Morel agreed to join Gimnasia y Esgrima on 18 June 2019, penning terms from Deportivo Riestra. Guillermo Pfund was announced as a new incoming on 18 June, but the move fell through on 21 June. They appeared in friendly action for the first time on 22 June, playing two friendlies with Colón of the Primera División at the Estadio Padre Ernesto Martearena; winning 1–0 and losing 4–0. Franco Lazzaroni signed for the club from Ferro Carril Oeste on 24 June, with Ezequiel Gallegos following from Platense two days later. Nahuel Zárate, from Fénix, joined Lobo jujeño on 28 June. Colombian centre-back Junior Bueno went back to his homeland on 29 June, signing a deal with Once Caldas.

Dino Castagno, a defender from Deportivo Español, penned with them on 29 June. They shared friendly wins with Bolivia's Oriente Petrolero on 29 June. 2018–19 loans expired on/around 30 June. Walter Busse was snapped up on 1 July after his release from Ferro Carril Oeste, which preceded the double agreement with Gonzalo Castillejos (San Martín (SJ) and Gonzalo Gómez (Huracán Las Heras) later in the day. On 5 July, Matías Carabajal met the media after securing terms; despite Gimnasia not publicising his arrival - à la with Álvaro Cazula. They experienced a draw and a loss to Atlético Tucumán in friendlies on 11 July. Federico Freire secured terms with San Telmo on 17 July. On the same date, a win apiece occurred in exhibition games at home to San Martín (T).

Facundo Callejo moved to All Boys on 25 July. Agustín Sufi departed to Patronato on a free transfer on 1 August. On 4 August, Gimnasia played San Martín (T) again - as they shared 2–1 wins. 9 August saw Gimnasia meet Central Norte in two friendlies, with the visitors edging a five-goal thriller in the initial match that preceded a 3–1 victory. Gimnasia captured Hernán Hechalar from Independiente Medellín on 13 August, as the Argentine centre-forward came back to Argentina after five years abroad.

=== August ===
Gimnasia suffered a defeat away to Deportivo Riestra in their first competitive game of 2019–20 in Primera B Nacional. Gonzalo Castillejos scored in that one, before notching again on matchday two during a 2–1 victory over Chacarita Juniors. Another win followed on 31 August on the road versus Brown.

== Squad ==
Squad No.	Nationality	Name	Position(s)	Date of birth (age)	Signed from
Goalkeepers
	Argentina	Carlos De Giorgi	GK	23 April 1984 (age 42)	Atlético de Rafaela
	Argentina	Gonzalo Gómez	GK	25 March 1986 (age 40)	Huracán Las Heras
	Argentina	Carlos Morel	GK	2 February 1987 (age 39)	Deportivo Riestra
Defenders
	Argentina	Nicolás Benavídez	LB	10 January 1992 (age 34)	Gimnasia y Esgrima (LP)
	Argentina	Luis Casarino	DF	9 December 1994 (age 31)	Academy
	Argentina	Dino Castagno	DF	8 July 1993 (age 33)	Deportivo Español
	Argentina	Álvaro Cazula	CB	16 August 1996 (age 30)	Gimnasia y Tiro
	Argentina	Leonardo Ferreyra	RB	21 October 1991 (age 35)	Academy
	Argentina	Ezequiel Gallegos	DF	16 April 1991 (age 35)	Platense
	Argentina	Franco Lazzaroni	CB	6 February 1988 (age 38)	Ferro Carril Oeste
	Argentina	Diego López	RB	19 May 1992 (age 34)	Gimnasia y Esgrima (M)
	Argentina	Alexis Machuca	CB	10 May 1990 (age 36)	Estudiantes
	Argentina	Gonzalo Nazario	CB	25 March 1995 (age 31)	Mitre Orán
	Argentina	Ignacio Sanabria	LB	29 December 1989 (age 36)	Academy
	Argentina	Sebastián Sánchez	CB	20 September 1988 (age 38)	Atlético de Rafaela
	Argentina	Nahuel Zárate	LB	27 January 1993 (age 33)	Fénix
Midfielders
	Argentina	Walter Busse	AM	3 March 1987 (age 39)	Ferro Carril Oeste
	Argentina	Matías Carabajal	CM	3 June 1986 (age 40)	Defensores de Fraile Pintado
	Argentina	Alejandro Frezzotti	CM	15 February 1984 (age 42)	Temperley
	Argentina	Daniel Juárez	MF	30 July 2001 (age 25)	Academy
	Argentina	Rodrigo Morales	MF	22 March 1994 (age 32)	Academy
	Argentina	Fabián Muñoz	RM	3 November 1991 (age 35)	Temperley
	Argentina	Enzo Serrano	AM	19 January 1998 (age 28)	Academy
	Argentina	Ulises Virreyra	LW	16 April 1997 (age 29)	Academy
Forwards
	Argentina	Mauro Buono	FW	20 April 1998 (age 28)	Academy
	Argentina	Gonzalo Castillejos	CF	5 March 1986 (age 40)	San Martín (SJ)
	Argentina	Matías Córdoba	FW	16 April 1994 (age 32)	Tiro y Gimnasia Jujuy
	Argentina	Hernán Hechalar	CF	12 August 1988 (age 38)	Independiente Medellín
	Uruguay	Diego Martiñones	CF	25 January 1985 (age 41)	Rampla Juniors
	Argentina	Julián Ramírez	FW	28 October 1999 (age 27)	Academy

== Transfers ==
Domestic transfer windows:
3 July 2019 to 24 September 2019
20 January 2020 to 19 February 2020.

=== Transfers in ===
Date from	Position	Nationality	Name	From	Ref.
1 July 2019	AM	Argentina	Walter Busse	Ferro Carril Oeste (Note: Released by Ferro Carril Oeste on 30 June.)	
3 July 2019 (Note: Deal agreed on 18 June 2019)	GK	Argentina	Carlos Morel	Deportivo Riestra	
3 July 2019 (Note: Deal agreed on 24 June 2019)	CB	Argentina	Franco Lazzaroni	Ferro Carril Oeste	
3 July 2019 (Note: Deal agreed on 28 June 2019)	DF	Argentina	Ezequiel Gallegos	Platense	
3 July 2019 (Note: Deal agreed on 28 June 2019)	LB	Argentina	Nahuel Zárate	Fénix	
3 July 2019 (Note: Deal agreed on 29 June 2019)	DF	Argentina	Dino Castagno	Deportivo Español	
3 July 2019 (Note: Deal agreed on 1 July 2019)	CF	Argentina	Gonzalo Castillejos	San Martín (SJ)	
3 July 2019 (Note: Deal agreed on 1 July 2019)	GK	Argentina	Gonzalo Gómez	Huracán Las Heras	
3 July 2019	CB	Argentina	Álvaro Cazula	Gimnasia y Tiro	
5 July 2019	CM	Argentina	Matías Carabajal	Defensores de Fraile Pintado	
13 August 2019	CF	Argentina	Hernán Hechalar	Independiente Medellín	

=== Transfers out ===
Date from	Position	Nationality	Name	To	Ref.
3 July 2019 (Note: Deal agreed on 17 June 2019)	CB	Argentina	Nicolás Caro	Atlanta	
8 July 2019 (Note: Deal agreed on 28 June 2019)	CB	Colombia	Junior Bueno	Once Caldas	
17 July 2019	AM	Argentina	Federico Freire	San Telmo	
25 July 2019	FW	Argentina	Facundo Callejo	All Boys	
1 August 2019	MF	Argentina	Agustín Sufi	Patronato	

== Friendlies ==
=== Pre-season ===
Gimnasia y Esgrima had back-to-back friendlies with Primera División outfit Colón scheduled on 14 June 2019 for 22 June, played neutrally at the Estadio Padre Ernesto Martearena in Salta. Gimnasia would also meet Oriente Petrolero, on 29 June, and Atlético Tucumán, on 11 July. San Martín (T) would also face Gimnasia twice in pre-season on two separate occasions, while also meeting Central Norte.

Win Draw Loss

22 June 2019 Friendly	Colón	0–1	Gimnasia y Esgrima	Salta, Argentina
16:00 GMT-3		Sin Mordaza	D. López	Stadium: Estadio Padre Ernesto Martearena; Attendance: 0 (Note: Behind closed doors.)

22 June 2019 Friendly	Colón	4–0	Gimnasia y Esgrima	Salta, Argentina
17:00 GMT-3	M. Hernández; W. Morelo; T. Sandoval	Agenciafe		Stadium: Estadio Padre Ernesto Martearena; Attendance: 0 (Note: Behind closed doors.)

29 June 2019 Friendly	Gimnasia y Esgrima	3–1	Oriente Petrolero	San Salvador de Jujuy, Argentina
	U. Virreyra; M. Córdoba; D. López		P. Ruiz	Stadium: Hotel Los Arcos; Attendance: 0 (Note: Behind closed doors.)

29 June 2019 Friendly	Gimnasia y Esgrima	0–1	Oriente Petrolero	San Salvador de Jujuy, Argentina
			Goal	Stadium: Hotel Los Arcos; Attendance: 0 (Note: Behind closed doors.)

11 July 2019 Friendly	Gimnasia y Esgrima	0–0	Atlético Tucumán	Salta, Argentina
		Atlético Tucumán; El Tucumano; 70 min. match		Stadium: Hotel de La Liga Salta; Referee: Federico Benítez (Argentina)

11 July 2019 Friendly	Gimnasia y Esgrima	0–2	Atlético Tucumán	Salta, Argentina
		Atlético Tucumán; El Tucumano; 70 min. match	R. Rodríguez; E. Cabellos (o.g.)	Stadium: Hotel de La Liga Salta; Referee: Federico Benítez (Argentina)

17 July 2019 Friendly	Gimnasia y Esgrima	0–1	San Martín (T)	San Salvador de Jujuy, Argentina
10:00 GMT-3		Gimnasia y Esgrima; Vía País; 60 min. match	M. Fissore	Stadium: Hotel Los Arcos

17 July 2019 Friendly	Gimnasia y Esgrima	1–0	San Martín (T)	San Salvador de Jujuy, Argentina
	E. Gallegos	Gimnasia y Esgrima; Vía País; 60 min. match		Stadium: Hotel Los Arcos

4 August 2019 Friendly	San Martín (T)	1–2	Gimnasia y Esgrima	San Miguel de Tucumán, Argentina
10:00 GMT-3	J. González	Gimnasia y Esgrima; LV12	D. Juárez	Stadium: Complejo Natalio Mirkin

4 August 2019 Friendly	San Martín (T)	2–1	Gimnasia y Esgrima	San Miguel de Tucumán, Argentina
16:00 GMT-3	R. Costa	Gimnasia y Esgrima; LV12	D. Juárez	Stadium: Estadio La Ciudadela

9 August 2019 Friendly	Gimnasia y Esgrima	2–3	Central Norte	San Salvador de Jujuy, Argentina
18:00 GMT-3	U. Virreyra; D. Juárez	Gimnasia y Esgrima; Grupo La Provincia	G. Yapura; T. Zelaya; B. Jurado	Stadium: Estadio 23 de Agosto

9 August 2019 Friendly	Gimnasia y Esgrima	3–1	Central Norte	San Salvador de Jujuy, Argentina
20:00 GMT-3	G. Castillejos 13'; M. Córdoba 61'; U. Virreyra 72'	Gimnasia y Esgrima; Grupo La Provincia	G. Ríos 55' (pen.)	Stadium: Estadio 23 de Agosto

== Competitions ==
=== Primera B Nacional ===
==== Results summary ====
Overall								Home						Away					
Pld	W	D	L	GF	GA	GD	Pts	W	D	L	GF	GA	GD	W	D	L	GF	GA	GD
21	4	7	10	4	3	+1	19	2	5	3	2	1	+1	2	2	7	2	2	0

Last updated: 3 September 2019.
Source: Soccerway

==== Matches ====
The fixtures for the 2019–20 league season were announced on 1 August 2019, with a new format of split zones being introduced. Gimnasia y Esgrima were drawn in Zone B.

Win Draw Loss

18 August 2019 1	Deportivo Riestra	2–1	Gimnasia y Esgrima	Buenos Aires, Argentina
15:30 GMT-3	E. Tovo 61'; G. Bravo 76' (pen.)	El Tribuno; Soccerway	G. Castillejos 31'	Stadium: Estadio Guillermo Laza; Referee: Mariano González (Argentina)

24 August 2019 2	Gimnasia y Esgrima	2–1	Chacarita Juniors	San Salvador de Jujuy, Argentina
17:40 GMT-3	G. Castillejos 24'; M. Córdoba 85'	Jujuy al día Soccerway	B. Mieres 47'	Stadium: Estadio 23 de Agosto; Referee: Julio Barraza (Argentina)

31 August 2019 3	Brown	0–1	Gimnasia y Esgrima	Adrogué, Argentina
15:30 GMT-3		Gimnasia y Esgrima; Jujuy al Momento; Soccerway	M. Córdoba 38'	Stadium: Estadio Lorenzo Arandilla; Referee: Yamil Possi (Argentina)

8 September 2019 4	Gimnasia y Esgrima	0–0	Tigre	San Salvador de Jujuy, Argentina
21:05 GMT-3				Stadium: Estadio 23 de Agosto

14 September 2019 5	Defensores de Belgrano	3–2	Gimnasia y Esgrima
	Benegas 18'; Gimenez 65'; Martinez 90+5'		J. Sanabria 26'; G. Castillejos 44'

19 September 2019 6	Gimnasia y Esgrima	0–0	Quilmes

27 September 2019 7	Atletico Rafaela	2–0	Gimnasia y Esgrima

6 October 2019 8	Gimnasia y Esgrima	0–0	All Boys

13 October 2019 9	Gimnasia Mendoza	2–0	Gimnasia y Esgrima

21 October 2019 10	Deportivo Santamarina	0–0	Gimnasia y Esgrima

3 November 2019 11	Gimnasia y Esgrima	3–0	Instituto

10 November 2019 12	San Martin de Tucuman	2–0	Gimnasia y Esgrima

15 November 2019 13	Gimnasia y Esgrima	0–0	Almagro

24 November 2019 14	Villa Dalmine	0–1	Gimnasia y Esgrima

29 November 2019 15	Gimnasia y Esgrima	1–3	Sarmiento

7 February 2020 16	Gimnasia y Esgrima	0–1	Deportivo Riestra

15 February 2020 17	Chacarita Juniors	0–0	Gimnasia y Esgrima

21 February 2020 18	Gimnasia y Esgrima	1–1	Brown

28 February 2020 19	Tigre	3–1	Gimnasia y Esgrima

6 March 2020 20	Gimnasia y Esgrima	0–1	Defensores de Belgrano

15 March 2020 21	Quilmes	1–0	Gimnasia y Esgrima

== Squad statistics ==
=== Appearances and goals ===
No.	Pos.	Nationality	Name	League		Cup		League Cup		Continental		Other		Total		Discipline		Ref
No.	Pos.	Nationality	Name	Apps	Goals	Apps	Goals	Apps	Goals	Apps	Goals	Apps	Goals	Apps	Goals	Yellow card	Red card	Ref
–	GK	Argentina	Carlos De Giorgi	0	0	—		—		—		0	0	0	0	0	0	
–	GK	Argentina	Gonzalo Gómez	0	0	—		—		—		0	0	0	0	0	0	
–	GK	Argentina	Carlos Morel	3	0	—		—		—		0	0	3	0	1	0	
–	LB	Argentina	Nicolás Benavídez	0	0	—		—		—		0	0	0	0	0	0	
–	DF	Argentina	Luis Casarino	0	0	—		—		—		0	0	0	0	0	0	
–	DF	Argentina	Dino Castagno	0	0	—		—		—		0	0	0	0	0	0	
–	CB	Argentina	Álvaro Cazula	0	0	—		—		—		0	0	0	0	0	0	
–	RB	Argentina	Leonardo Ferreyra	3	0	—		—		—		0	0	3	0	0	0	
–	DF	Argentina	Ezequiel Gallegos	0(2)	0	—		—		—		0	0	0(2)	0	0	0	
–	RB	Argentina	Diego López	3	0	—		—		—		0	0	3	0	1	0	
–	CB	Argentina	Alexis Machuca	0	0	—		—		—		0	0	0	0	0	0	
–	CB	Argentina	Gonzalo Nazario	0	0	—		—		—		0	0	0	0	0	0	
–	LB	Argentina	Ignacio Sanabria	3	0	—		—		—		0	0	3	0	1	0	
–	CB	Argentina	Sebastián Sánchez	3	0	—		—		—		0	0	3	0	1	0	
–	LB	Argentina	Nahuel Zárate	0(1)	0	—		—		—		0	0	0(1)	0	0	0	
–	AM	Argentina	Walter Busse	2	0	—		—		—		0	0	2	0	0	0	
–	CM	Argentina	Matías Carabajal	1(1)	0	—		—		—		0	0	1(1)	0	0	0	
–	CM	Argentina	Alejandro Frezzotti	3	0	—		—		—		0	0	3	0	1	0	
–	MF	Argentina	Daniel Juárez	0(1)	0	—		—		—		0	0	0(1)	0	0	0	
–	RM	Argentina	Rodrigo Morales	3	0	—		—		—		0	0	3	0	1	0	
–	RM	Argentina	Fabián Muñoz	0	0	—		—		—		0	0	0	0	0	0	
–	AM	Argentina	Enzo Serrano	0	0	—		—		—		0	0	0	0	0	0	
–	LW	Argentina	Ulises Virreyra	0(2)	0	—		—		—		0	0	0(2)	0	0	0	
–	FW	Argentina	Mauro Buono	0	0	—		—		—		0	0	0	0	0	0	
–	CF	Argentina	Gonzalo Castillejos	3	2	—		—		—		0	0	3	2	0	0	
–	FW	Argentina	Matías Córdoba	3	2	—		—		—		0	0	3	2	0	0	
–	CB	Argentina	Franco Lazzaroni	3	0	—		—		—		0	0	3	0	1	0	
–	CF	Argentina	Hernán Hechalar	0(1)	0	—		—		—		0	0	0(1)	0	0	0	
–	CF	Uruguay	Diego Martiñones	0	0	—		—		—		0	0	0	0	0	0	
–	FW	Argentina	Julián Ramírez	0	0	—		—		—		0	0	0	0	0	0	
Own goals				—	0	—		—		—		—	0	—	0	—	—	—

Statistics accurate as of 3 September 2019.

=== Goalscorers ===
Rank	Pos	No.	Nat	Name	League	Cup	League Cup	Continental	Other	Total	Ref
1	CF	–	Argentina	Gonzalo Castillejos	2	—	—	—	0	2	
2	FW	–	Argentina	Matías Córdoba	1	—	—	—	0	1	
Own goals					0	—	—	—	0	0	
Totals					3	—	—	—	0	3	—
