= Juan Alvacete =

Argentine professional footballer

Personal information
- Full name: Juan Ignacio Alvacete
- Date of birth: 12 January 1991 (age 35)
- Place of birth: Mendoza, Argentina
- Height: 1.84 m (6 ft 0 in)
- Positions: Centre-back; left-back

Team information
- Current team: Central Norte

Youth career
- Independiente Rivadavia

Senior career*
Years	Team	Apps	(Gls)
2011–2013	Independiente Rivadavia	57	(4)
2013–2014	Tigre	1	(0)
2014–2016	Godoy Cruz	15	(0)
2016–2017	Instituto	8	(0)
2017–2018	Santamarina	11	(0)
2018–2021	Villa Dálmine	32	(0)
2021	Deportivo Maipú	3	(0)
2021	→ Central Norte (loan)	15	(0)
2022	Chacarita Juniors	23	(1)
2023	Defensores de Belgrano	5	(0)
2024–2025	Libertad	33	(0)
2025–	Central Norte	13	(0)
- * Club domestic league appearances and goals as of 16:21, 21 July 2025 (UTC)

Juan Ignacio Alvacete (born 12 January 1991) is an Argentine professional footballer who plays as a centre-back or left-back for Central Norte.

== Career ==
Alvacete's career began with Independiente Rivadavia. He appeared for his senior debut in a Primera B Nacional defeat to Gimnasia y Esgrima in March 2011, on the way to a total of eight appearances in the 2010–11 campaign as they finished eighteenth. In his 2011–12 opener versus Ferro Carril Oeste on 11 September 2011, Alvacete scored his first goal in a 3–0 victory at the Estadio Bautista Gargantini. Goals against Gimnasia y Esgrima, Defensa y Justicia and Crucero del Norte came in two further seasons as he featured fifty-seven times for them. On 12 July 2013, Alvacete joined Primera División side Tigre.

Fellow top-flight club Godoy Cruz signed Alvacete on 30 June 2014. He stayed for 2014, 2015 and 2016 to play in fifteen fixtures, though none of which came in 2016 as he departed the team. Moves to Instituto and Santamarina in Primera B Nacional subsequently arrived, prior to Alvacete joining Villa Dálmine on 30 June 2018. His first appearances followed in July in Copa Argentina games with UAI Urquiza and River Plate.

In February 2021, Alvacete signed with Deportivo Maipú. At the end of June 2021, he was loaned out to Central Norte for the rest of the year. In January 2022, Alvacete moved to Chacarita Juniors.

== Career statistics ==
As of 30 March 2019.

Appearances and goals by club, season and competition
Club	Season	League			Cup		Continental		Other		Total	
Club	Season	Division	Apps	Goals	Apps	Goals	Apps	Goals	Apps	Goals	Apps	Goals
Independiente Rivadavia	2010–11	Primera B Nacional	8	0	0	0	—		0	0	0	0
Independiente Rivadavia	2011–12	Primera B Nacional	18	2	0	0	—		0	0	18	2
Independiente Rivadavia	2012–13	Primera B Nacional	31	2	0	0	—		0	0	31	2
Independiente Rivadavia	Total		57	4	0	0	—		0	0	57	4
Tigre	2013–14	Primera División	1	0	0	0	—		0	0	1	0
Godoy Cruz	2014	Primera División	4	0	1	0	0	0	0	0	5	0
Godoy Cruz	2015	Primera División	11	0	0	0	—		0	0	11	0
Godoy Cruz	2016	Primera División	0	0	0	0	—		0	0	0	0
Godoy Cruz	Total		15	0	1	0	0	0	0	0	16	0
Instituto	2016–17	Primera B Nacional	8	0	1	0	—		0	0	9	0
Santamarina	2017–18	Primera B Nacional	11	0	0	0	—		0	0	11	0
Villa Dálmine	2018–19	Primera B Nacional	17	0	2	0	—		0	0	19	0
Career total			109	4	4	0	0	0	0	0	113	4
