= Ezequiel Gallegos =

Argentine footballer

Personal information
- Full name: Ezequiel Adrián Gallegos
- Date of birth: 16 April 1991 (age 35)
- Place of birth: San Justo, Argentina
- Height: 1.75 m (5 ft 9 in)
- Position: Midfielder

Team information
- Current team: Olimpo

Senior career*
Years	Team	Apps	(Gls)
2010–2017	Huracán	37	(0)
2013	→ Johor Darul Ta'zim II (loan)	0	(0)
2016–2017	→ Almagro (loan)	42	(1)
2017–2019	Platense	45	(3)
2019–2020	Gimnasia Jujuy	19	(0)
2021–2022	Almopos Aridea	0	(0)
2022	Temperley	17	(0)
2023	Nueva Chicago	24	(0)
2024	Los Andes	35	(2)
2025–	Olimpo	9	(0)
- * Club domestic league appearances and goals as of 16:16, 21 June 2025 (UTC)

Ezequiel Adrián Gallegos (born 16 April 1991) is an Argentine professional footballer who plays as a midfielder for Torneo Federal A club Olimpo.

== Career ==
Gallegos' career began with Huracán. He made his professional debut on 18 September 2011 in a Primera B Nacional match with Independiente Rivadavia, having previously been an unused substitute versus Independiente in December 2010. After six further appearances in 2011–12 and 2012–13, Gallegos left the club on loan in January 2013 to join Malaysian Premier League side Johor Darul Ta'zim II. However, he returned to Huracán six months later without featuring. Three years later, Gallegos left again on loan to play for Almagro in Primera B Nacional. Forty-six appearances and one goal followed.

On 25 July 2017, Gallegos left Huracán permanently after signing for Primera B Metropolitana team Platense. His debut for Platense arrived on 2 September against Defensores de Belgrano. Overall, Gallegos scored once in twenty-one matches as the club won the 2017–18 Primera B Metropolitana title.

== Career statistics ==
As of 8 May 2018.

Club statistics
Club	Season	League			Cup (Note: Includes the Copa Argentina)		League Cup		Continental (Note: Includes the Copa Libertadores and Copa Sudamericana)		Other (Note: Includes the Primera B Nacional play-offs and Supercopa Argentina)		Total	
Club	Season	Division	Apps	Goals	Apps	Goals	Apps	Goals	Apps	Goals	Apps	Goals	Apps	Goals
Huracán	2010–11	Primera División	0	0	0	0	—		—		0	0	0	0
Huracán	2011–12	Primera B Nacional	2	0	1	0	—		—		0	0	3	0
Huracán	2012–13	Primera B Nacional	5	0	0	0	—		—		0	0	5	0
Huracán	2013–14	Primera B Nacional	12	0	1	0	—		—		0	0	13	0
Huracán	2014	Primera B Nacional	7	0	2	0	—		—		1 (Note: One appearance in 2014 Primera B Nacional play-offs)	0	10	0
Huracán	2015	Primera División	11	0	0	0	—		6 (Note: Four appearances in 2015 Copa Libertadores, two appearances in 2015 Copa Sudamericana)	0	1 (Note: One appearance in 2014 Supercopa Argentina)	0	18	0
Huracán	2016	Primera División	0	0	0	0	—		0	0	0	0	0	0
Huracán	2016–17	Primera División	0	0	0	0	—		0	0	0	0	0	0
Huracán	Total		37	0	4	0	—		6	0	2	0	49	0
Johor Darul Ta'zim II (loan)	2013	Premier League	0	0	0	0	—		—		0	0	0	0
Almagro (loan)	2016	Primera B Nacional	18	1	1	0	—		—		0	0	19	1
Almagro (loan)	2016–17	Primera B Nacional	24	0	3	0	—		—		0	0	27	0
Almagro (loan)	Total		42	1	4	0	—		—		0	0	46	1
Platense	2017–18	Primera B Metropolitana	24	1	0	0	—		—		1 (Note: One appearance in 2017–18 Primera B Metropolitana play-offs)	0	25	1
Career total			103	2	8	0	—		6	0	3	0	120	2

== Honours ==
Huracán

- Copa Argentina: 2013–14
- Supercopa Argentina: 2014

Platense

- Primera B Metropolitana: 2017–18
