= Rodrigo Morales =

Rodrigo Morales may refer to:

- Rodrigo Morales (footballer, born March 1994), Argentine midfielder
- Rodrigo Morales (footballer, born August 1994), Venezuelan defender or midfielder
