= Julián Ramírez =

Argentine footballer

Personal information
- Full name: Julián Ramírez
- Date of birth: 28 October 1999 (age 27)
- Place of birth: San Salvador de Jujuy, Argentina
- Height: 1.69 m (5 ft 7 in)
- Position: Forward

Team information
- Current team: Deportivo Armenio

Youth career
- 2014–2017: Gimnasia Jujuy

Senior career*
| Years | Team | Apps | (Gls) |
| 2017–2021 | Gimnasia Jujuy | 25 | (3) |
| 2022– | Deportivo Armenio | 15 | (6) |
- * Club domestic league appearances and goals as of 18:16, 21 July 2022 (UTC)

Julián Ramírez (born 28 October 1999) is an Argentine professional footballer who plays as a forward for Deportivo Armenio.

== Career ==
=== Club ===
Ramírez began in the ranks of Gimnasia y Esgrima from 2014. He made his professional debut at the Estadio Comandante Andrés Guacurarí against Crucero del Norte on 30 July 2017, featuring for the opening sixty-five minutes of a 0–3 victory. That was his sole appearance throughout 2016–17, with a further twenty two arriving during 2017–19.

=== International ===
In 2018, Ramírez received call-ups to train with both the Argentina U19s and Argentina U20s.

== Career statistics ==
As of 15 January 2019.

Club statistics
| Club | Season | League | | | Cup | | Continental | | Other | | Total | |
| Club | Season | Division | Apps | Goals | Apps | Goals | Apps | Goals | Apps | Goals | Apps | Goals |
|---|---|---|---|---|---|---|---|---|---|---|---|---|
| Gimnasia y Esgrima | 2016–17 | Primera B Nacional | 1 | 0 | 0 | 0 | — | | 0 | 0 | 1 | 0 |
| Gimnasia y Esgrima | 2017–18 | Primera B Nacional | 3 | 0 | 0 | 0 | — | | 0 | 0 | 3 | 0 |
| Gimnasia y Esgrima | 2018–19 | Primera B Nacional | 2 | 0 | 1 | 0 | — | | 0 | 0 | 3 | 0 |
| Career total | | | 6 | 0 | 1 | 0 | — | | 0 | 0 | 7 | 0 |
