= Nicolás Benavídez =

Argentine footballer

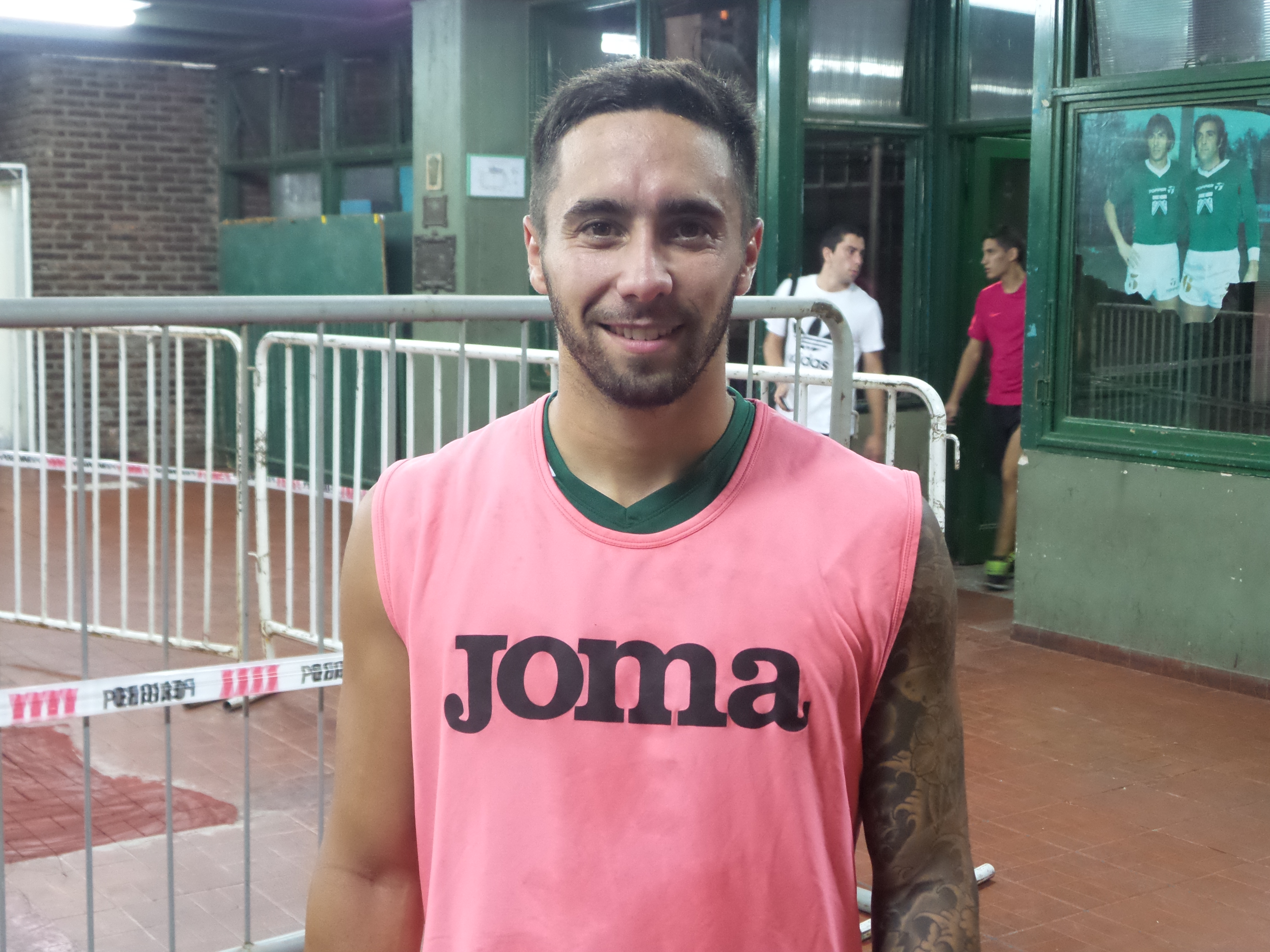
- Nicolás Benavídez in 2015.

Personal information
- Full name: Nicolás Raúl Benavídez
- Date of birth: 10 January 1992 (age 34)
- Place of birth: Tandil, Argentina
- Height: 1.72 m (5 ft 7 1/2 in)
- Position: Left back

Team information
- Current team: Club Villa San Carlos

Senior career*
Years	Team	Apps	(Gls)
2012–2018	Gimnasia LP	22	(0)
2014–2015	→ Ferro Carril Oeste (loan)	14	(1)
2016	→ Almagro (loan)	1	(0)
2018–2019	Gimnasia Jujuy	3	(0)
2019–	Olimpo	6	(0)
- * Club domestic league appearances and goals as of 23:00, 9 October 2019 (UTC)

Nicolás Raúl Benavídez (born 10 January 1992) is an Argentine professional footballer who plays as a left back for Olimpo.

== Career ==
Benavídez started his career in La Plata with Gimnasia y Esgrima. He appeared in thirteen fixtures for the Primera B Nacional team in 2011–12, which included his professional debut on 13 February 2012 against Atlético Tucumán at the Estadio Monumental José Fierro. Eight further appearances occurred across 2012–13 as the club won promotion to the Primera División. In June 2014, after one top-flight appearance, Benavídez was loaned back to Primera B Nacional with Ferro Carril Oeste. He scored his first senior goal on 16 November in a 3–0 win over Guaraní Antonio Franco. He played nine times.

January 2016 saw Benavídez join Almagro on loan. He returned to his parent club in June after a sole match for them; a three-minute cameo versus Gimnasia y Esgrima of San Salvador de Jujuy. Gimnasia y Esgrima were to be Benavídez's next club, with the defender signing on 30 June 2018.

== Career statistics ==
As of 8 January 2019.

Club statistics
Club	Season	League			Cup		Continental		Other		Total	
Club	Season	Division	Apps	Goals	Apps	Goals	Apps	Goals	Apps	Goals	Apps	Goals
Gimnasia y Esgrima (LP)	2011–12	Primera B Nacional	13	0	0	0	—		0	0	13	0
Gimnasia y Esgrima (LP)	2012–13	Primera B Nacional	8	0	0	0	—		0	0	8	0
Gimnasia y Esgrima (LP)	2013–14	Primera División	1	0	0	0	—		0	0	1	0
Gimnasia y Esgrima (LP)	2014	Primera División	0	0	0	0	—		0	0	0	0
Gimnasia y Esgrima (LP)	2015	Primera División	0	0	0	0	—		0	0	0	0
Gimnasia y Esgrima (LP)	2016	Primera División	0	0	0	0	—		0	0	0	0
Gimnasia y Esgrima (LP)	2016–17	Primera División	0	0	0	0	0	0	0	0	0	0
Gimnasia y Esgrima (LP)	2017–18	Primera División	0	0	0	0	—		0	0	0	0
Gimnasia y Esgrima (LP)	Total		22	0	0	0	0	0	0	0	22	0
Ferro Carril Oeste (loan)	2014	Primera B Nacional	9	1	0	0	—		0	0	9	1
Ferro Carril Oeste (loan)	2015	Primera B Nacional	5	0	2	0	—		0	0	7	0
Ferro Carril Oeste (loan)	Total		14	1	2	0	—		0	0	16	1
Almagro (loan)	2016	Primera B Nacional	1	0	0	0	—		0	0	1	0
Gimnasia y Esgrima (J)	2018–19	Primera B Nacional	1	0	0	0	—		0	0	1	0
Career total			38	1	2	0	0	0	0	0	40	1
