= Carlos De Giorgi =

Argentine footballer (born 1984)

Personal information
- Full name: Carlos Alberto De Giorgi
- Date of birth: 23 April 1984 (age 42)
- Place of birth: Córdoba, Argentina
- Height: 1.86 m (6 ft 1 in)
- Position: Goalkeeper

Team information
- Current team: Talleres de Perico

Youth career
- Talleres

Senior career*
Years	Team	Apps	(Gls)
2003–2006	Racing de Córdoba	20	(0)
2006–2007	Gimnasia Jujuy	0	(0)
2007–2009	Belgrano	3	(0)
2009–2010	Gimnasia Jujuy	23	(0)
2010–2011	Atlético de Rafaela	3	(0)
2011–2013	Ferro Carril Oeste	37	(0)
2013–2014	Central Norte	25	(0)
2014–2016	Atlético de Rafaela	17	(0)
2016–2020	Gimnasia Jujuy	31	(0)
2021	Altos Hornos Zapla	8	(0)
2021–	Talleres de Perico	13	(0)
- * Club domestic league appearances and goals

Carlos Alberto De Giorgi (born 23 April 1984) is an Argentine professional footballer who plays as a goalkeeper for Talleres de Perico.

== Career ==
After a youth stint with Talleres, De Giorgi began his career with Racing de Córdoba in Torneo Argentino A. He remained for three seasons, one of which being in Primera B Nacional after 2003–04 promotion, whilst making twenty appearances. In 2006, Gimnasia y Esgrima signed De Giorgi. He didn't appear in the Argentine Primera División, departing a year after signing in 2007 to play in the second tier with Belgrano. Three appearances followed. De Giorgi rejoined Gimnasia y Esgrima in 2009, subsequently participating twenty-three times in 2009–10. A move to Atlético de Rafaela followed, along with promotion as champions.

On 30 June 2011, De Giorgi moved to Ferro Carril Oeste to remain in Primera B Nacional. He was selected in thirty-eight matches in his first campaign, but failed to play in 2012–13. De Giorgi spent the following twelve months with Torneo Argentino A's Central Norte. They were relegated in his sole season with the club. July 2014 saw De Giorgi return to Atlético de Rafaela, where he featured on seventeen occasions in the Primera División, before the goalkeeper went back to Gimnasia y Esgrima on 17 July 2016 for a third spell. His first appearance didn't arrive until October 2018, as he played the full duration of a win over Instituto.

June 2020 saw De Giorgi depart Gimnasia following the expiration of his contract. Ahead of the 2020 season, De Giorgi signed with Altos Hornos Zapla. A year later, in November 2021, he moved to Talleres de Perico.

== Career statistics ==
As of 5 July 2020.

Club statistics
Club	Season	League			Cup		Continental		Other		Total	
Club	Season	Division	Apps	Goals	Apps	Goals	Apps	Goals	Apps	Goals	Apps	Goals
Racing de Córdoba	2004–05	Primera B Nacional	0	0	0	0	—		0	0	0	0
Gimnasia y Esgrima	2006–07	Primera División	0	0	0	0	—		0	0	0	0
Belgrano	2007–08	Primera B Nacional	2	0	0	0	—		0	0	2	0
Belgrano	2008–09	Primera B Nacional	1	0	0	0	—		0	0	1	0
Belgrano	Total		3	0	0	0	—		0	0	3	0
Gimnasia y Esgrima	2009–10	Primera B Nacional	23	0	0	0	—		0	0	23	0
Atlético de Rafaela	2010–11	Primera B Nacional	3	0	0	0	—		0	0	3	0
Ferro Carril Oeste	2011–12	Primera B Nacional	37	0	1	0	—		0	0	38	0
Ferro Carril Oeste	2012–13	Primera B Nacional	0	0	0	0	—		0	0	0	0
Ferro Carril Oeste	Total		37	0	1	0	—		0	0	38	0
Central Norte	2013–14	Torneo Argentino A	25	0	0	0	—		1 (Note: Appearance(s) in the Torneo Argentino A play-offs)	0	26	0
Atlético de Rafaela	2014	Primera División	0	0	0	0	—		0	0	0	0
Atlético de Rafaela	2015	Primera División	17	0	1	0	—		0	0	18	0
Atlético de Rafaela	2016	Primera División	0	0	0	0	—		0	0	0	0
Atlético de Rafaela	Total		17	0	1	0	—		0	0	18	0
Gimnasia y Esgrima	2016–17	Primera B Nacional	0	0	0	0	—		0	0	0	0
Gimnasia y Esgrima	2017–18	Primera B Nacional	0	0	0	0	—		0	0	0	0
Gimnasia y Esgrima	2018–19	Primera B Nacional	20	0	0	0	—		0	0	20	0
Gimnasia y Esgrima	2019–20	Primera B Nacional	11	0	0	0	—		0	0	11	0
Gimnasia y Esgrima	Total		31	0	0	0	—		0	0	31	0
Career total			139	0	2	0	—		1	0	142	0

== Honours ==
Racing de Córdoba

- Torneo Argentino A: 2003–04

Atlético de Rafaela

- Primera B Nacional: 2010–11
