= Daniel Juárez =

Daniel Juárez may refer to:

- Daniel Juárez (footballer, born 1975), Argentine midfielder
- Daniel Juárez (footballer, born 2001), Argentine midfielder
- Daniel Juárez (cyclist), Argentine cyclist
