= Diego López (footballer, born 1992) =

Argentine footballer

Personal information
- Full name: Diego Fores López
- Date of birth: 19 May 1992 (age 34)
- Place of birth: San Salvador de Jujuy, Argentina
- Height: 1.71 m (5 ft 7 in)
- Position: Right-back

Team information
- Current team: Gimnasia Jujuy

Youth career
- Gimnasia Jujuy

Senior career*
Years	Team	Apps	(Gls)
2012–2016	Gimnasia Jujuy	61	(0)
2016–2017	Central Córdoba SdE	31	(0)
2017–2018	Gimnasia Mendoza	22	(1)
2018–2022	Gimnasia Jujuy	67	(4)
2022–2024	Estudiantes BA	33	(0)
2024–	Gimnasia Jujuy	50	(2)
- * Club domestic league appearances and goals as of 17:14, 28 April 2026 (UTC)

Diego Fores López (born 19 May 1992) is an Argentine professional footballer who plays as a right-back for Gimnasia Jujuy.

== Career ==
López began his senior career with San Salvador de Jujuy's Gimnasia y Esgrima. Mario Gómez promoted the defender into the club's senior squad towards the end of the 2011–12 Primera B Nacional, with his professional debut arriving in a goalless tie with their La Plata namesakes; he made five more appearances that campaign. Fifty-nine more matches in all competitions occurred for López with Gimnasia y Esgrima, across six Primera B Nacional seasons. On 1 July 2016, López joined fellow second tier team Central Córdoba. After thirty-one appearances and relegation, López moved to Mendoza's Gimnasia y Esgrima.

Whilst with Gimnasia y Esgrima, López netted his first career goal during a 5–0 home win over Unión Aconquija on 12 October 2017. He participated in twenty-four fixtures as they won promotion to Primera B Nacional. López left on 30 June 2018 to rejoin Gimnasia y Esgrima of Jujuy. Ahead of the 2022 season, López moved to Estudiantes de Buenos Aires.

== Career statistics ==
As of 10 January 2019.

Club statistics
Club	Season	League			Cup		Continental		Other		Total	
Club	Season	Division	Apps	Goals	Apps	Goals	Apps	Goals	Apps	Goals	Apps	Goals
Gimnasia y Esgrima (J)	2011–12	Primera B Nacional	6	0	0	0	—		0	0	6	0
Gimnasia y Esgrima (J)	2012–13	Primera B Nacional	0	0	0	0	—		0	0	0	0
Gimnasia y Esgrima (J)	2013–14	Primera B Nacional	18	0	0	0	—		0	0	18	0
Gimnasia y Esgrima (J)	2014	Primera B Nacional	18	0	0	0	—		2 (Note: Appearance(s) in the Primera B Nacional play-offs)	0	20	0
Gimnasia y Esgrima (J)	2015	Primera B Nacional	10	0	1	0	—		0	0	11	0
Gimnasia y Esgrima (J)	2016	Primera B Nacional	9	0	1	0	—		0	0	10	0
Gimnasia y Esgrima (J)	Total		61	0	2	0	—		2	0	65	0
Central Córdoba	2016–17	Primera B Nacional	31	0	0	0	—		0	0	31	0
Gimnasia y Esgrima (M)	2017–18	Torneo Federal A	22	1	3	0	—		2 (Note: Appearance(s) in the Torneo Federal A play-offs)	0	27	1
Gimnasia y Esgrima (J)	2018–19	Primera B Nacional	4	1	0	0	—		0	0	4	1
Career total			118	2	5	0	—		4	0	127	2
