= Sanabria =

Sanabria may refer to:

- Sanabria (katydid), a genus of bush crickets or katydids in the subfamily Phaneropterinae
- Sanabria (comarca), a comarca in the province of Zamora, Spain
  - Puebla de Sanabria, a town in the comarca
- Sanabria Lake, a natural lake of Spain
  - Sanabria Lake Natural Park
- 25089 Sanabria-Rivera, a Main Belt minor planet
- Cerro Sanabria, a mountain in Bolivia

== People ==
Sanabria is also used as a surname in Spanish speaking countries and refers to:

- Antonio Sanabria (born 1996), Paraguayan footballer
- Bobby Sanabria (born 1957), American musician
- Edgar Sanabria (1911–1989), president of Venezuela
- Héctor Arnaldo Sanabria (1985–2013), Argentine footballer
- Ignacio Sanabria (born 1989), Argentine footballer
- Juan de Sanabria (1504–1549), Spanish conquistador
- Juan Manuel Sanabria (born 2000), Uruguayan footballer
- Mariangela Sanabria, Canadian politician
- Mateo Sanabria (born 2004), Argentine footballer
- Miguel Sanabria (born 1964), Paraguayan footballer
- Miguel Ángel Sanabria (1967–2006), Colombian road cyclist
- Nicolas Sanabria (1889–1945), American philatelist
- Ricardo Sanabria (born 1969), Paraguayan footballer
- Rubén Hugo Ayala Sanabria (born 1950), Argentine footballer
- Ulises Armand Sanabria (1906–1969), American developer of mechanical televisions

== See also ==
- Mario Zanabria (born 1948), Argentine footballer
