= Lucas Sánchez =

Lucas Sánchez may refer to:

- Lucas Sánchez (footballer, born 1994), Argentine midfielder
- Lucas Sánchez (footballer, born 1997), Argentine defender
