= Ignacio Sanabria =

Argentine footballer

Personal information
- Full name: Ignacio Jorge Sanabria
- Date of birth: 29 December 1989 (age 36)
- Place of birth: San Salvador de Jujuy, Argentina
- Height: 1.74 m (5 ft 9 in)
- Position: Left-back

Team information
- Current team: Gimnasia y Tiro

Senior career*
Years	Team	Apps	(Gls)
2010–2020	Gimnasia Jujuy	156	(2)
2020–2021	Brown de Adrogué	36	(0)
2022–	Gimnasia y Tiro	17	(0)
- * Club domestic league appearances and goals as of 20:41, 19 July 2022 (UTC)

Ignacio Jorge Sanabria (born 29 December 1989) is an Argentine professional footballer who plays as a left-back for Gimnasia y Tiro.

== Career ==
Sanabria's senior career began with Gimnasia y Esgrima, appearing on the substitutes bench in September 2010 for a Primera B Nacional fixture with Tiro Federal. His professional debut arrived in the following June against CAI, as he was subbed on for the final three minutes of a 4–2 victory at the Estadio 23 de Agosto. He made one hundred and nineteen appearances in nine seasons with Gimnasia y Esgrima. In his tenth campaign, Sanabria scored his first senior goal during an away draw versus Sarmiento on 1 December 2018.

== Personal life ==
In May 2014, Sanabria failed a drug test after a Primera B Nacional match against San Martín on 19 April due to benzoylecgonine traces found in his urine sample. He was suspended by the AFA for three months.

== Career statistics ==
As of 11 January 2019

Appearances and goals by club, season and competition
Club	Season	League			Cup		Continental		Other		Total	
Club	Season	Division	Apps	Goals	Apps	Goals	Apps	Goals	Apps	Goals	Apps	Goals
Gimnasia y Esgrima	2010–11	Primera B Nacional	1	0	0	0	—		0	0	1	0
Gimnasia y Esgrima	2011–12	Primera B Nacional	13	0	1	0	—		0	0	14	0
Gimnasia y Esgrima	2012–13	Primera B Nacional	23	0	0	0	—		0	0	23	0
Gimnasia y Esgrima	2013–14	Primera B Nacional	6	0	1	0	—		0	0	7	0
Gimnasia y Esgrima	2014	Primera B Nacional	0	0	0	0	—		0	0	0	0
Gimnasia y Esgrima	2015	Primera B Nacional	17	0	0	0	—		0	0	17	0
Gimnasia y Esgrima	2016	Primera B Nacional	3	0	1	0	—		0	0	4	0
Gimnasia y Esgrima	2016–17	Primera B Nacional	30	0	0	0	—		0	0	30	0
Gimnasia y Esgrima	2017–18	Primera B Nacional	23	0	0	0	—		0	0	23	0
Gimnasia y Esgrima	2018–19	Primera B Nacional	11	1	1	0	—		0	0	12	1
Career total			127	1	4	0	0	0	0	0	131	1
