= Carlos Morel =

Carlos Morel may refer to:

- Carlos Morel (footballer) (born 1987), Argentine goalkeeper
- Carlos Morel (painter) (1813–1894), Argentine painter
