= Rodrigo Morales (footballer, born March 1994) =

Argentine footballer

Personal information
- Full name: Rodrigo Nicolás Morales
- Date of birth: 22 March 1994 (age 32)
- Place of birth: San Salvador de Jujuy, Argentina
- Height: 1.75 m (5 ft 9 in)
- Position: Midfielder

Team information
- Current team: Guabirá
- Number: 15

Youth career
- Gimnasia Jujuy

Senior career*
Years	Team	Apps	(Gls)
2012–2020	Gimnasia Jujuy	116	(6)
2021–2022	Wilstermann	24	(0)
2022	Universitario de Sucre	20	(0)
2023	Vaca Díez	31	(0)
2024–	Guabirá	15	(0)
- * Club domestic league appearances and goals as of 21:07, 19 July 2022 (UTC)

Rodrigo Nicolás Morales (born 22 March 1994) is an Argentine professional footballer who plays as a midfielder for Guabirá.

== Career ==
Morales started his career with Gimnasia y Esgrima. After being an unused substitute for Primera B Nacional fixtures with Boca Unidos and Almirante Brown, Morales appeared in his first professional match during a scoreless draw at home to Independiente Rivadavia on 10 June 2012. During the 2013–14 campaign, Morales was loaned to Torneo Argentino B's Monterrico. Back with Gimnasia y Esgrima, on his seventy-first appearance in October 2017, he scored his opening senior goal versus Quilmes.

== Career statistics ==
As of 14 January 2019.

Club statistics
Club	Season	League			Cup		Continental		Other		Total	
Club	Season	Division	Apps	Goals	Apps	Goals	Apps	Goals	Apps	Goals	Apps	Goals
Gimnasia y Esgrima	2011–12	Primera B Nacional	1	0	0	0	—		0	0	0	0
Gimnasia y Esgrima	2012–13	Primera B Nacional	0	0	0	0	—		0	0	0	0
Gimnasia y Esgrima	2013–14	Primera B Nacional	0	0	0	0	—		0	0	0	0
Gimnasia y Esgrima	2014	Primera B Nacional	6	0	0	0	—		0	0	6	0
Gimnasia y Esgrima	2015	Primera B Nacional	19	0	1	0	—		0	0	20	0
Gimnasia y Esgrima	2016	Primera B Nacional	9	0	0	0	—		0	0	9	0
Gimnasia y Esgrima	2016–17	Primera B Nacional	31	0	0	0	—		0	0	31	0
Gimnasia y Esgrima	2017–18	Primera B Nacional	8	1	0	0	—		0	0	8	1
Gimnasia y Esgrima	2018–19	Primera B Nacional	8	0	0	0	—		0	0	8	0
Career total			82	1	1	0	—		0	0	83	1
