= Carlos Morel (footballer) =

Argentine footballer (born 1987)

Personal information
- Full name: Carlos David Morel
- Date of birth: 2 February 1987 (age 39)
- Place of birth: Barranqueras, Argentina
- Height: 1.84 m (6 ft 0 in)
- Position: Goalkeeper

Team information
- Current team: Deportivo Laferrere

Youth career
- Resistencia Central
- 2001–2008: Boca Juniors

Senior career*
Years	Team	Apps	(Gls)
2008–2009	Chacarita Juniors	0	(0)
2009	Sportivo Belgrano	0	(0)
2010	Patronato	1	(0)
2010–2011	Chacarita Juniors	1	(0)
2011–2014	Patronato	3	(0)
2014	→ Almagro (loan)	2	(0)
2015	Deportivo Morón	24	(1)
2016–2019	Deportivo Riestra	82	(0)
2019–2020	Gimnasia Jujuy	5	(0)
2020–2021	Deportivo Riestra	3	(0)
2022–	Deportivo Laferrere	11	(1)
- * Club domestic league appearances and goals

Carlos David Morel (born 2 February 1987) is an Argentine professional footballer who plays as a goalkeeper for Deportivo Laferrere.

== Career ==
Morel joined Boca Juniors' youth set-up from Resistencia Central in 2001. In July 2008, Morel completed a move to Chacarita Juniors of Primera B Nacional. He remained for one season as they won promotion, though didn't feature before leaving in 2009 to Sportivo Belgrano. 2010 saw Morel join Patronato. He played once in Torneo Argentino A. Morel resigned with Chacarita Juniors for 2010–11, appearing against San Martín, prior to rejoining Patronato. He made three appearances across three seasons, featuring against Independiente Rivadavia, Defensa y Justicia and Villa San Carlos having been benched sixty-four times.

On 28 July 2014, Morel was loaned to Primera B Metropolitana's Almagro. Two appearances followed, as they finished bottom of Zone 2 in 2014. Morel spent the 2015 campaign in the third tier with Deportivo Morón. He notably scored his first senior goal with the club, converting a penalty in a 1–0 win over Defensores de Belgrano on 15 August. After twenty-eight matches with the Buenos Aires outfit, Morel departed on 8 January 2016 to Deportivo Riestra. His first appearance came in March against Deportivo Armenio, which preceded a further twenty-nine in two seasons as they won promotion to tier two in 2016–17.

Morel spent the 2019–20 campaign with Gimnasia y Esgrima. Morel then returned to Deportivo Riestra, where he played for one and a half years, before joining Deportivo Laferrere ahead of the 2022 season.

== Career statistics ==
As of 5 July 2020.

Appearances and goals by club, season and competition
Club	Season	League			Cup		League Cup		Continental		Other		Total	
Club	Season	Division	Apps	Goals	Apps	Goals	Apps	Goals	Apps	Goals	Apps	Goals	Apps	Goals
Chacarita Juniors	2008–09	Primera B Nacional	0	0	0	0	—		—		0	0	0	0
Sportivo Belgrano	2009–10	Torneo Argentino A	0	0	0	0	—		—		0	0	0	0
Patronato	2009–10	Torneo Argentino A	1	0	0	0	—		—		0	0	1	0
Chacarita Juniors	2010–11	Primera B Nacional	1	0	0	0	—		—		0	0	1	0
Patronato	2011–12	Primera B Nacional	1	0	0	0	—		—		0	0	1	0
Patronato	2012–13	Primera B Nacional	1	0	0	0	—		—		0	0	1	0
Patronato	2013–14	Primera B Nacional	1	0	0	0	—		—		0	0	1	0
Patronato	2014	Primera B Nacional	0	0	0	0	—		—		0	0	0	0
Patronato	Total		3	0	0	0	—		—		0	0	3	0
Almagro (loan)	2014	Primera B Metropolitana	2	0	0	0	—		—		0	0	2	0
Deportivo Morón	2015	Primera B Metropolitana	24	1	0	0	—		—		4 (Note: Appearance(s) in the Primera B Metropolitana play-offs)	0	28	1
Deportivo Riestra	2016	Primera B Metropolitana	7	0	0	0	—		—		0	0	7	0
Deportivo Riestra	2016–17	Primera B Metropolitana	17	0	1	0	—		—		5	0	23	0
Deportivo Riestra	2017–18	Primera B Nacional	23	0	1	0	—		—		0	0	24	0
Deportivo Riestra	2018–19	Primera B Metropolitana	35	0	1	0	—		—		0	0	36	0
Deportivo Riestra	Total		82	0	3	0	—		—		5	0	90	0
Gimnasia y Esgrima	2019–20	Primera B Nacional	5	0	0	0	—		—		0	0	5	0
Career total			118	1	3	0	—		—		9	0	130	1

== Honours ==
Patronato

- Torneo Argentino A: 2009–10
