= Enzo Serrano =

Argentine footballer

Personal information
- Full name: Enzo Serrano
- Date of birth: 19 January 1998 (age 28)
- Place of birth: Palpalá, Argentina
- Height: 1.76 m (5 ft 9 in)
- Position: Midfielder

Team information
- Current team: Central Norte

Youth career
- Gimnasia Jujuy

Senior career*
Years	Team	Apps	(Gls)
2016–2020	Gimnasia Jujuy	28	(0)
2020–2021	Estudiantes BA	0	(0)
2021	Colegiales	26	(1)
2022–	Central Norte	3	(0)
- * Club domestic league appearances and goals as of 21:11, 19 July 2022 (UTC)

Enzo Serrano (born 19 January 1998) is an Argentine professional footballer who plays as a midfielder for Central Norte.

== Career ==
Serrano began his career with Gimnasia y Esgrima. He made his first appearances during the 2016–17 Primera B Nacional season under Mario Sciacqua, starting fixtures against Atlético Paraná and Brown; his final match of the season versus Instituto saw him receive his first senior red card. Serrano made twenty appearances across his opening two campaigns with the club.

== Career statistics ==
As of 14 January 2019.

Club statistics
Club	Season	League			Cup		Continental		Other		Total	
Club	Season	Division	Apps	Goals	Apps	Goals	Apps	Goals	Apps	Goals	Apps	Goals
Gimnasia y Esgrima	2016–17	Primera B Nacional	11	0	0	0	—		0	0	11	0
Gimnasia y Esgrima	2017–18	Primera B Nacional	9	0	0	0	—		0	0	9	0
Gimnasia y Esgrima	2018–19	Primera B Nacional	2	0	0	0	—		0	0	2	0
Career total			22	0	0	0	—		0	0	22	0
