= Dino Castagno =

Argentine professional footballer

Personal information
- Full name: Dino Miguel Castagno
- Date of birth: 8 July 1993 (age 33)
- Place of birth: Pozo del Molle, Argentina
- Height: 1.83 m (6 ft 0 in)
- Position: Centre-back

Youth career
- 1999–2006: Fundación Pozo del Molle
- 2001–2006: Club Deportivo Argentino
- 2006–2013: Boca Juniors

Senior career*
Years	Team	Apps	(Gls)
2013–2016	Boca Juniors	2	(0)
2015	→ Guillermo Brown (loan)	1	(0)
2017–2019	Deportivo Español	52	(1)
2019–2020	Gimnasia y Esgrima	0	(0)
2021	San Martín	10	(0)
- * Club domestic league appearances and goals

Dino Miguel Castagno (born 8 July 1993) is an Argentine professional footballer who plays as a centre-back.

== Career ==
Castagno played for Fundación Pozo del Molle from the age of six, prior to concurrently appearing for Club Deportivo Argentino from 2001. He joined Boca Juniors in 2006, subsequently appearing at the 2012 U-20 Copa Libertadores. In 2012–13, after he was an unused substitute for fixtures with San Lorenzo and Colón, Castagno made his professional debut on 26 May 2013 during a 4–0 loss to Newell's Old Boys; he featured one more time against La Plata's Gimnasia y Esgrima in the succeeding campaign. In January 2015, Castagno joined Guillermo Brown of Primera B Nacional on loan. One appearance came.

In January 2017, Deportivo Español signed Castagno. His first goal came in October 2018 versus Fénix in Primera B Metropolitana. Castagno spent 2019–20 with San Salvador de Jujuy's Gimnasia y Esgrima, though didn't feature in Primera B Nacional prior to being released in June 2020. At the start of 2021, he played five matches for San Martín in Torneo Regional Federal Amateur. In March 2021, Castagno saw a move to Concepción del Uruguay with Gimnasia y Esgrima fall through due to a failed medical.

== Career statistics ==
As of 11 March 2021.

Appearances and goals by club, season and competition
Club	Season	League			Cup		League Cup		Continental		Other		Total	
Club	Season	Division	Apps	Goals	Apps	Goals	Apps	Goals	Apps	Goals	Apps	Goals	Apps	Goals
Boca Juniors	2012–13	Primera División	1	0	0	0	—		0	0	0	0	1	0
Boca Juniors	2013–14	Primera División	1	0	0	0	—		0	0	0	0	1	0
Boca Juniors	2014	Primera División	0	0	0	0	—		0	0	0	0	0	0
Boca Juniors	2015	Primera División	0	0	0	0	—		0	0	0	0	0	0
Boca Juniors	2016	Primera División	0	0	0	0	—		0	0	0	0	0	0
Boca Juniors	2016–17	Primera División	0	0	0	0	—		0	0	0	0	0	0
Boca Juniors	Total		2	0	0	0	—		0	0	0	0	2	0
Guillermo Brown (loan)	2015	Primera B Nacional	1	0	0	0	—		—		0	0	1	0
Deportivo Español	2016–17	Primera B Metropolitana	6	0	0	0	—		—		1 (Note: Appearance(s) in the Primera B Metropolitana play-offs)	0	7	0
Deportivo Español	2017–18	Primera B Metropolitana	18	0	0	0	—		—		0	0	18	0
Deportivo Español	2018–19	Primera B Metropolitana	28	1	0	0	—		—		0	0	28	1
Deportivo Español	Total		52	1	0	0	—		—		1	0	53	1
Gimnasia y Esgrima	2019–20	Primera B Nacional	0	0	0	0	—		—		0	0	0	0
San Martín	2021	Federal Amateur	5	0	0	0	—		—		0	0	5	0
Career total			60	1	0	0	—		0	0	1	0	61	1
