= Franco Lazzaroni =

Argentine footballer (born 1988)

Personal information
- Full name: Franco Martín Lazzaroni
- Date of birth: February 6, 1988 (age 38)
- Place of birth: Sarmiento, Santa Fe, Argentina
- Height: 1.79 m (5 ft 10 in)
- Position: Centre-back

Youth career
- Colón

Senior career*
Years	Team	Apps	(Gls)
2008–2009	Colón	0	(0)
2009–2010	Tiro Federal	9	(0)
2010–2011	Racing de Córdoba	24	(1)
2011–2013	Defensa y Justicia	64	(0)
2013–2014	Newell's Old Boys	4	(0)
2014–2015	Colón	33	(1)
2015–2016	San Martín SJ	19	(0)
2017–2018	Atlético de Rafaela	12	(1)
2018	Sol de América	15	(0)
2019	Ferro Carril Oeste	3	(0)
2019–2020	Gimnasia Jujuy	20	(0)
2020–2021	Boca Unidos	25	(0)
- * Club domestic league appearances and goals as of 16:22, 19 July 2022 (UTC)

Franco Lazzaroni (born 6 February 1988 in Sarmiento, Santa Fe) is an Argentine footballer who plays as a centre-back.
