= Gonzalo Nazario =

Argentine footballer

Personal information
- Full name: Facundo Gonzalo Nazario
- Date of birth: 25 March 1995 (age 31)
- Place of birth: Salta, Argentina
- Height: 1.81 m (5 ft 11 in)
- Position: Centre-back

Senior career*
Years	Team	Apps	(Gls)
2013–2014	Unión Güemes	11	(0)
2015	Mitre	22	(1)
2016–2019	Gimnasia Jujuy	10	(0)
2020–2021	Juventud Antoniana	5	(0)
- * Club domestic league appearances and goals as of 16:24, 19 July 2022 (UTC)

Facundo Gonzalo Nazario (born 25 March 1995) is an Argentine professional footballer who plays as a centre-back.

== Career ==
Nazario began his career in Torneo Argentino B with Unión Güemes. After eleven appearances and relegation, Nazario moved to Mitre in 2015 where he scored one goal in twenty-two fixtures in Torneo Federal B. In January 2016, Nazario joined Primera B Nacional side Gimnasia y Esgrima. He made his professional bow on 1 April 2018 against Independiente Rivadavia, having been on the substitutes bench sixteen times during 2016, 2016–17 and 2017–18. Nazario left Gimnasia midway through 2019–20 following ten appearances. In January 2020, Nazario headed to Juventud Antoniana of Torneo Regional Federal Amateur.

== Career statistics ==
As of 1 September 2020.

Club statistics
Club	Season	League			Cup		Continental		Other		Total	
Club	Season	Division	Apps	Goals	Apps	Goals	Apps	Goals	Apps	Goals	Apps	Goals
Unión Güemes	2013–14	Torneo Argentino B	11	0	0	0	—		0	0	11	0
Mitre	2015	Torneo Federal B	22	1	0	0	—		0	0	22	1
Gimnasia y Esgrima	2016	Primera B Nacional	0	0	0	0	—		0	0	0	0
Gimnasia y Esgrima	2016–17	Primera B Nacional	0	0	0	0	—		0	0	0	0
Gimnasia y Esgrima	2017–18	Primera B Nacional	3	0	0	0	—		0	0	3	0
Gimnasia y Esgrima	2018–19	Primera B Nacional	7	0	0	0	—		0	0	7	0
Gimnasia y Esgrima	2019–20	Primera B Nacional	0	0	0	0	—		0	0	0	0
Gimnasia y Esgrima	Total		10	0	0	0	—		0	0	10	0
Juventud Antoniana	2020	Torneo Amateur	3	0	0	0	—		0	0	3	0
Career total			46	1	0	0	—		0	0	46	1
