= Lucas Sánchez (footballer, born 1994) =

Argentine footballer

Personal information
- Full name: Lucas Maximiliano Sánchez
- Date of birth: 25 January 1994 (age 32)
- Place of birth: San Miguel de Tucumán, Argentina
- Position: Midfielder

Senior career*
Years	Team	Apps	(Gls)
2013–2014	Atlético Tucumán	1	(0)
2016	Vélez Sarsfield	9	(0)
- * Club domestic league appearances and goals

Lucas Maximiliano Sánchez (born 25 January 1994) is an Argentine footballer who plays as a midfielder. He is currently a free agent.

== Career ==
Sánchez started his career in the system of Atlético Tucumán. He was moved into the senior side in 2013, subsequently making his professional debut during a 1–0 defeat to Douglas Haig on 17 June. His next appearance for the club arrived on 9 April 2014 as Atlético Tucumán were eliminated from the Copa Argentina by Ferro Carril Oeste. In 2016, Sánchez participated nine times for Vélez Sarsfield in Torneo Federal B.

== Career statistics ==
As of 23 December 2018.

Club statistics
Club	Season	League			Cup (Note: Includes the Copa Argentina)		League Cup		Continental		Other		Total	
Club	Season	Division	Apps	Goals	Apps	Goals	Apps	Goals	Apps	Goals	Apps	Goals	Apps	Goals
Atlético Tucumán	2012–13	Primera B Nacional	1	0	0	0	—		—		0	0	1	0
Atlético Tucumán	2013–14	Primera B Nacional	0	0	1	0	—		—		0	0	1	0
Career total			1	0	1	0	—		—		0	0	2	0
