= Nicolás Caro =

Argentine footballer

Personal information
- Full name: Nicolás Ezequiel Caro Torres
- Date of birth: 4 May 1995 (age 31)
- Place of birth: Caseros, Buenos Aires, Argentina
- Height: 1.92 m (6 ft 4 in)
- Position: Centre-back

Team information
- Current team: Estudiantes BA (on loan from Deportivo Riestra)

Youth career
- –2015: Estudiantes BA

Senior career*
Years	Team	Apps	(Gls)
2014–2016	Estudiantes BA	46	(9)
2016–2025	Cerro Porteño	0	(0)
2016–2017	→ Lanús (loan)	0	(0)
2017–2018	→ Brown de Adrogué (loan)	15	(0)
2018–2019	→ Gimnasia Jujuy (loan)	10	(1)
2019–2021	→ Atlanta (loan)	12	(1)
2021	→ Güemes (loan)	1	(0)
2021–2022	→ Deportivo Riestra (loan)	28	(0)
2023	→ Chacarita Juniors (loan)	28	(2)
2024	→ Deportivo Riestra (loan)	32	(1)
2025–	Deportivo Riestra	10	(0)
2026–	→ Estudiantes BA (loan)	2	(0)
- * Club domestic league appearances and goals as of 16:04, 28 April 2026 (UTC)

Nicolás Ezequiel Caro Torres (born 4 May 1995) is an Argentine professional footballer who plays as a centre-back for Estudiantes BA, on loan from Deportivo Riestra.
