= Ulises Virreyra =

Argentine footballer (born 1998)

Personal information
- Full name: Ulises Virreyra
- Date of birth: 16 April 1998 (age 28)
- Place of birth: San Salvador de Jujuy, Argentina
- Position: Midfielder

Team information
- Current team: Gimnasia Jujuy

Youth career
- Gimnasia Jujuy

Senior career*
| Years | Team | Apps | (Gls) |
| 2016– | Gimnasia Jujuy | 62 | (4) |
| 2021 | → Olimpo (loan) | 6 | (0) |
- * Club domestic league appearances and goals as of 21:16, 19 July 2022 (UTC)

Ulises Virreyra (born 16 April 1998) is an Argentine professional footballer who plays as a midfielder for Gimnasia y Esgrima.

== Career ==
Virreyra's senior career with Gimnasia y Esgrima started in the 2016–17 campaign, with him making his professional bow during a home loss to Chacarita Juniors on 18 December 2016. His first goal arrived in the following March when he netted the second goal of a 2–0 victory over Crucero del Norte. Another goal followed five months later in the reverse fixture with Crucero del Norte, with those goals arriving either side of a strike against Villa Dálmine.

== Career statistics ==
As of 14 January 2019.

Club statistics
| Club | Season | League | | | Cup | | Continental | | Other | | Total | |
| Club | Season | Division | Apps | Goals | Apps | Goals | Apps | Goals | Apps | Goals | Apps | Goals |
|---|---|---|---|---|---|---|---|---|---|---|---|---|
| Gimnasia y Esgrima | 2016–17 | Primera B Nacional | 18 | 3 | 0 | 0 | — | | 0 | 0 | 18 | 3 |
| Gimnasia y Esgrima | 2017–18 | Primera B Nacional | 10 | 0 | 0 | 0 | — | | 0 | 0 | 10 | 0 |
| Gimnasia y Esgrima | 2018–19 | Primera B Nacional | 8 | 1 | 1 | 0 | — | | 0 | 0 | 9 | 1 |
| Career total | | | 36 | 4 | 1 | 0 | — | | 0 | 0 | 37 | 4 |
