= 2012–13 in Argentine football =

Football in Argentina
- Season: 2012–13

Men's football
- Primera División: Vélez Sarsfield (Torneo inícial); Newell's Old Boys (Torneo final); Vélez Sarsfield (Superfinal)
- Primera B Nacional: Rosario Central
- Copa Argentina: Arsenal
- Supercopa Argentina: Arsenal

2012–13 season of Argentine football is the 122nd season of competitive football in Argentina.

== National teams ==
=== Men's ===
This section covers Argentina men's matches from August 1, 2012 to July 31, 2013.

==== Friendlies ====
August 15, 2012	Germany	1 – 3	Argentina	Frankfurt, Germany
20:45 CEST	Zieler (red card) 30'; Höwedes 82'	Report	Zabaleta (yellow card) 26'; Messi (penalty missed) 32' 52'; Khedira 45' (o.g.); Di María 73'	Stadium: Commerzbank Arena; Attendance: 48,808; Referee: Jonas Eriksson (Sweden)

September 19, 2012 2012 Superclásico de las Américas	Brazil	2 – 1	Argentina	Goiânia, Brazil
	Paulinho 26', (yellow card) 80'; Neymar 90+4' (pen.), (yellow card) 88'		Martínez 20'; Desábato (yellow card) 90+2'	Stadium: Estádio Serra Dourada; Referee: Carlos Amarilla (Paraguay)

November 14, 2012	Saudi Arabia	0 – 0	Argentina	Riyadh, Saudi Arabia
20:00 AST	Abdullah (yellow card) 90+3'		Zabaleta (yellow card) 62'	Stadium: King Fahd International Stadium; Referee: Ali Abdulnabi (Bahrain)

November 21, 2012 2012 Superclásico de las Américas	Argentina	2 – 1 (3 – 4 p)	Brazil	Buenos Aires, Argentina
	Scocco 81' (pen.), 89'		Fred 83'	Stadium: Estadio Alberto J. Armando; Referee: Enrique Osses (Chile)
	Penalties
	Martínez (penalty missed); Montillo (penalty scored); Domínguez (penalty scored); Scocco (penalty missed); Orión (penalty scored)		(penalty scored) Neves; (penalty scored) Juan; (penalty missed) Carlinhos; (penalty scored) Fred; (penalty scored) Neymar

February 6, 2013	Sweden	2 – 3	Argentina	Stockholm, Sweden
	J. Olsson 17'; Elm 90+5'		Lustig 3' (o.g.); Agüero 19'; Higuaín 23'

June 14, 2013	Guatemala	0 – 4	Argentina	Guatemala City, Guatemala
20:00 UTC−06:00		Report	Messi 15', 40', 49'; Fernández 36'	Stadium: Estadio Mateo Flores; Referee: Armando Castro (Honduras)

==== 2014 World Cup qualifiers ====
September 7, 2012 Round 7	Argentina	3 – 1	Paraguay	Córdoba, Argentina
20:10 UTC−3	Di María 3'; Higuaín 30'; Messi 64'; Palacio (yellow card) 80'; Braña (yellow card) 82'	Report	Fabbro 17' (pen.); Ortiz (yellow card) 21'; Piris (yellow card) 32'; Cáceres (yellow card) 63'; Valdez (yellow card) 78'	Stadium: Estadio Mario Alberto Kempes; Attendance: 51,000; Referee: Wilson Seneme (Brazil)

September 11, 2012 Round 8	Peru	1 – 1	Argentina	Lima, Peru
20:25 UTC−5	Pizarro (penalty missed) 3' (yellow card) 40'; Advíncula (yellow card) 8'; Zambrano 22'; Lobatón (yellow card) 40'; Ramírez (yellow card) 83'	Report	Higuaín 38'; Campagnaro (yellow card) 88'; Di María (yellow card) 90'	Stadium: Estadio Nacional; Attendance: 34,111; Referee: Wilmar Roldán (Colombia)

October 12, 2012 Round 9	Argentina	3 – 0	Uruguay	Mendoza, Argentina
21:00 UTC−3	Messi 66', 80'; Agüero 75'	Report	Cáceres (yellow card) 30'; Lugano (yellow card) 50'; M. Pereira (yellow card) 89'	Stadium: Estadio Malvinas Argentinas; Attendance: 31,997; Referee: Leandro Vuaden (Brazil)

October 16, 2012 Round 10	Chile	1 – 2	Argentina	Santiago, Chile
21:05 UTC–3	Beausejour (yellow card) 49'; Díaz (yellow card) 55'; Vargas (yellow card) 75'; Gutiérrez 90+1'	Report	Messi 28'; Higuaín 31'; Di María (yellow card) 50'	Stadium: Estadio Nacional; Attendance: 45,000; Referee: Antonio Arias (Paraguay)

22 March 2013 Round 11	Argentina	3 – 0	Venezuela	Buenos Aires, Argentina
21:00 UTC−3	Higuaín 29', 59'; Messi 45' (pen.)	Report		Stadium: Estadio Monumental Antonio Vespucio Liberti; Attendance: 40,000; Referee: Víctor Carrillo (Peru)

March 26, 2013 Round 12	Bolivia	1 − 1	Argentina	La Paz, Bolivia
16:00 UTC-4	Martins 25'; Gutiérrez (yellow card) 66'; Raldes (yellow card) 76'	[Report]	Banega 44', (yellow card) 47'; Mascherano (yellow card) 79'	Stadium: Estadio Hernando Siles; Referee: Enrique Osses (Chile)

June 7, 2013 Round 13	Argentina	0 − 0	Colombia	Buenos Aires, Argentina
--:--	Higuaín (red card) 30'; Biglia (yellow card) 40'; Garay (yellow card) 71'; Zabaleta (yellow card) 75'	Report	Aguilar (yellow card) 66'; Zapata (red card) 30'; Yepes (yellow card) 44'; Ramírez (yellow card) 73'; Zúñiga (yellow card) 85'	Stadium: Estadio Monumental Antonio Vespucio Liberti; Attendance: 44,807; Referee: Marlon Escalante (Venezuela)

June 11, 2013 Round 14	Ecuador	1 − 1	Argentina	Ecuador
--:--	Domínguez (yellow card) 2'; Castillo 17'; Caicedo (yellow card) 58'; Saritama (yellow card) 90'	Report	Agüero 4' (pen.); Di María (yellow card) 56'; Fernández (yellow card) 59'; Garay (yellow card) 67'; Mascherano (red card) 88'; Basanta (yellow card) 90+5'	Stadium: Quito, Estadio Olímpico Atahualpa; Referee: Enrique Cáceres (Paraguay)
