= Mauro Buono =

Argentine association football player

Personal information
- Full name: Mauro Buono
- Date of birth: 20 April 1998 (age 28)
- Place of birth: Monterrico, Argentina
- Position: Forward

Team information
- Current team: Gimnasia y Esgrima

Senior career*
Years	Team	Apps	(Gls)
2016–	Gimnasia Jujuy	32	(3)
2021	→ Sarmiento Resi. (loan)	3	(0)
2021–2022	→ Altos Hornos Zapla (loan)	10	(0)
- * Club domestic league appearances and goals as of 19:03, 20 July 2022 (UTC)

Mauro Buono (born 20 April 1998) is an Argentine professional footballer who plays as a forward for Gimnasia y Esgrima.

== Career ==
Buono's career began with Gimnasia y Esgrima. His professional bow arrived during a 4–2 victory in Primera B Nacional versus Guillermo Brown on 15 May 2016. Four appearances later, in July 2017, Buono scored for the first time after netting in a win away to Crucero del Norte. His first double figures season came in 2016–17 as he appeared ten times whilst scoring once; against Deportivo Morón on 30 April 2018.

== Career statistics ==
As of 14 January 2019.

Club statistics
Club	Season	League			Cup		Continental		Other		Total	
Club	Season	Division	Apps	Goals	Apps	Goals	Apps	Goals	Apps	Goals	Apps	Goals
Gimnasia y Esgrima	2016	Primera B Nacional	3	0	0	0	—		0	0	3	0
Gimnasia y Esgrima	2016–17	Primera B Nacional	2	1	0	0	—		0	0	2	1
Gimnasia y Esgrima	2017–18	Primera B Nacional	10	1	0	0	—		0	0	10	1
Gimnasia y Esgrima	2018–19	Primera B Nacional	5	0	0	0	—		0	0	5	0
Career total			20	2	0	0	—		0	0	20	2
