= Mario Lobo =

Argentine footballer

Personal information
- Full name: Mario Humberto Lobo
- Date of birth: August 21, 1964 (age 62)
- Place of birth: San Salvador de Jujuy, Argentina
- Height: 1.76 m (5 ft 9 in)

Youth career
- Policial Jujuy

Senior career*
Years	Team	Apps	(Gls)
1982–1985	Policial Jujuy		
1985–1987	Gimnasia de Jujuy		
1987–1990	Independiente	24	(6)
1989	→ Sporting Cristal (loan)		
1990	→ All Nippon Airways (loan)		
1991–1996	Gimnasia de Jujuy		
1996	Santiago Wanderers	11	(3)
1997–2000	Gimnasia de Jujuy		
2000–2001	Chacarita Juniors	25	(0)
2001–2002	Atlético Tucumán	13	(4)
2002–2003	Gimnasia de Jujuy		
2004	PSM Makassar		
2005	Altos Hornos Zapla	8	(2)

Managerial career
- 2007–2011: Gimnasia de Jujuy (assistant)
- 2009: Gimnasia de Jujuy (interim)
- 2011: Gimnasia de Jujuy (interim)
- 2013: Monterrico San Vicente
- 2018: Monterrico San Vicente
- * Club domestic league appearances and goals

Mario Humberto Lobo (born August 21, 1964, in San Salvador de Jujuy, Argentina) is an Argentine former footballer. He played for clubs in Argentina, Peru, Japan, Chile and Indonesia.

== Teams ==
- (Argentina) Policial de Jujuy 1982–1985
- (Argentina) Gimnasia y Esgrima de Jujuy 1985–1987
- (Argentina) Independiente 1987–1988
- (Peru) Sporting Cristal 1989
- (Argentina) Independiente 1989–1990
- (Japan) All Nippon Airways 1990
- (Argentina) Gimnasia y Esgrima de Jujuy 1992–1996
- (Chile) Santiago Wanderers 1996
- (Argentina) Gimnasia y Esgrima de Jujuy 1997–2000
- (Argentina) Chacarita Juniors 2000–2001
- (Argentina) Atlético Tucumán 2001–2002
- (Argentina) Gimnasia y Esgrima de Jujuy 2002–2003
- (Indonesia) PSM Makassar 2004
- (Argentina) Altos Hornos Zapla 2005

== Post-retirement ==
As a football coach, Lobo served as assistant coach of Gimnasia y Esgrima de Jujuy from 2007 to 2011.

Lobo also has developed a career in politics as councillor for San Salvador de Jujuy.

== Titles ==
- Gimnasia y Esgrima (J) 1993-1994 (Primera B Nacional Championship)
