= Sebastián Sánchez (footballer, born 1988) =

Argentine footballer

Personal information
- Full name: Sebastián Fernando Sánchez
- Date of birth: 20 September 1988 (age 38)
- Place of birth: Mendoza, Argentina
- Height: 1.79 m (5 ft 10 in)
- Position: Centre-back

Team information
- Current team: Gimnasia Jujuy

Youth career
- Chacras de Coria

Senior career*
Years	Team	Apps	(Gls)
2005–2007	Luján de Cuyo	20	(0)
2009–2012	Gimnasia Mendoza	89	(2)
2012–2013	Sportivo Desamparados	22	(2)
2013–2015	Gimnasia Jujuy	49	(3)
2015	Atlético de Rafaela	4	(0)
2016–2020	Gimnasia Jujuy	78	(3)
2020–2021	Khaitan SC		
2021–2022	Casarano	36	(1)
2022–2024	Bisceglie		
2024	Vittoria		
2025–	Gimnasia Jujuy	8	(0)
- * Club domestic league appearances and goals as of 17:08, 28 April 2026 (UTC)

Sebastián Fernando Sánchez (born 20 September 1988) is an Argentine professional footballer who plays as a centre-back for Gimnasia Jujuy.

== Career ==
Sánchez's career began with Luján de Cuyo in 2005, featuring in twenty Torneo Argentino A matches in two years. In 2009, Sánchez moved to Mendoza's Gimnasia y Esgrima. Twelve appearances followed as the club were relegated to Torneo Argentino B in 2008–09; he netted two goals across three years in the fourth tier. On 4 July 2012, Sportivo Desamparados signed Sánchez. In 2013, Sánchez moved up to Primera B Nacional with Gimnasia y Esgrima of San Salvador de Jujuy. He made his pro bow on 17 September versus Unión Santa Fe, with his first goal coming in November during a 1–1 draw against Defensa y Justicia.

After three goals and fifty-two matches for Gimnasia y Esgrima, Sánchez departed to play for Primera División side Atlético de Rafaela in January 2015. He participated in four fixtures in the top-flight, before sealing a return to Gimnasia y Esgrima (J) in early 2016.

In September 2020, Sánchez joined Kuwaiti club Khaitan SC. A year later, in August 2021, Sánchez signed with Italian Serie D club Casarano.

== Career statistics ==
As of 12 January 2019.

Club statistics
Club	Season	League			Cup		Continental		Other		Total	
Club	Season	Division	Apps	Goals	Apps	Goals	Apps	Goals	Apps	Goals	Apps	Goals
Gimnasia y Esgrima (M)	2008–09	Torneo Argentino A	12	0	0	0	—		0	0	12	0
Sportivo Desamparados	2012–13	Torneo Argentino A	22	2	1	0	—		0	0	23	2
Gimnasia y Esgrima (J)	2013–14	Primera B Nacional	30	3	1	0	—		0	0	31	3
Gimnasia y Esgrima (J)	2014	Primera B Nacional	19	0	0	0	—		2 (Note: Appearance(s) in the Primera B Nacional play-offs)	0	21	0
Gimnasia y Esgrima (J)	Total		49	3	1	0	—		2	0	52	3
Atlético de Rafaela	2015	Primera División	4	0	0	0	—		0	0	4	0
Gimnasia y Esgrima (J)	2016	Primera B Nacional	3	0	0	0	—		0	0	3	0
Gimnasia y Esgrima (J)	2016–17	Primera B Nacional	29	1	0	0	—		0	0	29	1
Gimnasia y Esgrima (J)	2017–18	Primera B Nacional	8	0	0	0	—		0	0	8	0
Gimnasia y Esgrima (J)	2018–19	Primera B Nacional	7	0	0	0	—		0	0	7	0
Gimnasia y Esgrima (J)	Total		47	3	0	0	—		0	0	47	3
Career total			134	8	2	0	—		2	0	138	8
