= Walter Busse =

Argentine footballer (born 1987)

Personal information
- Full name: Walter Alejandro Busse
- Date of birth: March 3, 1987 (age 39)
- Place of birth: General Güemes, Argentina
- Height: 1.70 m (5 ft 7 in)
- Position: Winger

Team information
- Current team: Gimnasia y Tiro

Senior career*
Years	Team	Apps	(Gls)
2004–2009	Gimnasia Jujuy	28	(0)
2007	→ Juventud Antoniana (loan)	29	(2)
2008	→ Atlético Minero (loan)	16	(1)
2009–2016	Independiente	38	(0)
2012–2013	→ Huracán (loan)	32	(2)
2013–2014	→ Defensa y Justicia (loan)	27	(1)
2014–2015	→ Manta FC (loan)	20	(1)
2015–2016	→ Defensa y Justicia (loan)	19	(2)
2016–2017	Sarmiento	43	(1)
2017–2018	San Martín de Tucumán	24	(1)
2018–2019	Ferro Carril Oeste	18	(1)
2019	Gimnasia Jujuy	9	(0)
2020–2021	Ferro Carril Oeste	11	(0)
2021–	Gimnasia y Tiro	147	(17)
- * Club domestic league appearances and goals as of 17:20, 11 August 2025 (UTC)

Walter Alejandro Busse (born 3 March 1987) is an Argentine football midfielder who plays for Gimnasia y Tiro.

== Career ==
Busse began his playing career in 2004 with Gimnasia y Esgrima de Jujuy in the Argentine 2nd division. He played in the Primera División between 2005 and 2009. During this time he had short loan stints with Juventud Antoniana of the regionalised 3rd division and with Atlético Minero of Peru.

After the relegation of Gimnasia, Busse joined Club Atlético Independiente where he soon established himself as a regular member of the first team squad.

== Honours ==
Independiente

- Copa Sudamericana (1): 2010
