= Matías Carabajal =

Argentine footballer

Personal information
- Full name: Matías Emilio Carabajal
- Date of birth: 24 February 1993 (age 33)
- Place of birth: Fraile Pintado, Argentina
- Height: 1.76 m (5 ft 9 in)
- Position: Midfielder

Senior career*
Years	Team	Apps	(Gls)
2006-2008	Ferro Carril Oeste		
2008-2010	Arsenal de Sarandí	7	(0)
2010-2011	Almirante Brown	12	(0)
2011	San Martín de San Juan	1	(0)
2012	Chacarita Juniors		
2011-2013	Ferro Carril Oeste	44	(0)
2013-2014	Atlético Tucumán	28	(0)
2014-2015	Douglas Haig	14	(0)
2015-2017	Central Córdoba	46	(0)
2017-2018	Atlético Paraná	16	(0)
2019-2020	Gimnasia Jujuy	11	(0)
- * Club domestic league appearances and goals

Matías Emilio Carabajal (born 3 June 1986 in Fraile Pintado, Jujuy) is an Argentine footballer. He currently plays as a midfielder for Central Córdoba of Torneo Federal A in Argentina.

== Clubs ==
Club	From	Years
Ferro Carril Oeste	Argentina	2006–2008
Arsenal de Sarandi	Argentina	2008–2010
Almirante Brown	Argentina	2010–2011
San Martín de San Juan	Argentina	2011
Chacarita Juniors	Argentina	2012
Ferro Carril Oeste	Argentina	2012–2013
Atlético Tucumán	Argentina	2013-2014
Douglas Haig	Argentina	2014-2015
Central Córdoba	Argentina	2015-
