= Daniel Juárez (footballer, born 2001) =

Argentine footballer

Personal information
- Full name: Daniel Eduardo Juárez
- Date of birth: 30 July 2001 (age 25)
- Place of birth: San Salvador de Jujuy, Argentina
- Height: 1.74 m (5 ft 9 in)
- Position: Right winger

Team information
- Current team: San Miguel (on loan from Unión Santa Fe)

Youth career
- Gimnasia Jujuy

Senior career*
| Years | Team | Apps | (Gls) |
| 2018–2020 | Gimnasia Jujuy | 12 | (2) |
| 2020– | Unión Santa Fe | 55 | (6) |
| 2020 | → Gimnasia Jujuy (loan) | 6 | (0) |
| 2024 | → Barracas Central (loan) | 17 | (0) |
| 2025 | → Gimnasia Jujuy (loan) | 20 | (0) |
| 2026– | → San Miguel (loan) | 8 | (0) |
- * Club domestic league appearances and goals as of 18:12, 5 May 2026 (UTC)

Daniel Eduardo Juárez (born 30 July 2001) is an Argentine professional footballer who plays as a right winger for San Miguel, on loan from Unión Santa Fe.

== Career ==
Juárez started his career in Primera B Nacional with Gimnasia y Esgrima. After being an unused substitute for fixtures with Brown, Ferro Carril Oeste, Nueva Chicago and Los Andes, the midfielder made his professional bow during a 2–0 defeat in Santiago del Estero to Central Córdoba; featuring for sixty minutes before being substituted off for Fabián Muñoz. He scored a brace on 3 November 2019 during a 3–0 victory over Instituto. On 30 January 2020, Juárez completed a transfer to Primera División side Unión Santa Fe. He was immediately loaned back to Gimnasia for six months until 30 June.

== Career statistics ==
As of 8 July 2020.

Appearances and goals by club, season and competition
| Club | Season | League | | | Cup | | League Cup | | Continental | | Other | | Total | |
| Club | Season | Division | Apps | Goals | Apps | Goals | Apps | Goals | Apps | Goals | Apps | Goals | Apps | Goals |
|---|---|---|---|---|---|---|---|---|---|---|---|---|---|---|
| Gimnasia y Esgrima | 2018–19 | Primera B Nacional | 3 | 0 | 0 | 0 | — | | — | | 0 | 0 | 3 | 0 |
| Gimnasia y Esgrima | 2019–20 | Primera B Nacional | 9 | 2 | 0 | 0 | — | | — | | 0 | 0 | 9 | 2 |
| Gimnasia y Esgrima | Total | | 12 | 2 | 0 | 0 | — | | — | | 0 | 0 | 12 | 2 |
| Unión Santa Fe | 2019–20 | Primera División | 0 | 0 | 0 | 0 | 0 | 0 | 0 | 0 | 0 | 0 | 0 | 0 |
| Gimnasia y Esgrima (loan) | 2019–20 | Primera B Nacional | 6 | 0 | 0 | 0 | — | | — | | 0 | 0 | 6 | 0 |
| Career total | | | 12 | 2 | 0 | 0 | 0 | 0 | 0 | 0 | 0 | 0 | 12 | 2 |
