= Matías Córdoba (footballer, born 1999) =

Argentine footballer

Personal information
- Full name: Matías Rodrigo Córdoba
- Date of birth: 16 April 1999 (age 27)
- Place of birth: San Pedro de Jujuy, Argentina
- Positions: Midfielder; forward

Team information
- Current team: Deportivo Morón (on loan from Talleres)

Senior career*
Years	Team	Apps	(Gls)
2014–2017	Tiro y Gimnasia	37	(3)
2017–2021	Gimnasia Jujuy	35	(7)
2020–2021	→ Talleres (loan)	0	(0)
2022–	Talleres	0	(0)
2022–	→ Deportivo Morón (loan)	4	(0)
- * Club domestic league appearances and goals as of 19:17, 20 July 2022 (UTC)

Matías Rodrigo Córdoba (born 16 April 1999) is an Argentine professional footballer who plays as a midfielder or forward for Deportivo Morón, on loan from Talleres.

== Career ==
Córdoba began his senior career in Torneo Federal B with Tiro y Gimnasia, a club of his birthplace. He scored three goals in thirty-seven fixtures in the fourth tier between 2014 and 2016, prior to securing a move to Primera B Nacional side Gimnasia y Esgrima in 2017. After twelve months in their reserve set-up, Córdoba moved into the club's first-team ahead of the 2018–19 campaign. His professional debut arrived during a fixture on 25 August with Arsenal de Sarandí, before netting his first goal on 22 September against Santamarina; days after he had signed his first pro contract. He scored four further goals that season.

In September 2020, after seven goals in thirty-six matches for Gimnasia y Esgrima, Córdoba was signed on loan by Primera División outfit Talleres. In January 2022, Talleres triggered the purchase option and signed Córdoba permanently. Due to knee injuries, he wasn't able to play for Talleres and in June 2022, Talleres loaned him out to Deportivo Morón until the end of the year.

== Career statistics ==
As of 11 November 2023.

Appearances and goals by club, season and competition
Club	Season	Division	League		Continental		Total	
Club	Season	Division	Apps	Goals	Apps	Goals	Apps	Goals
Gimnasia Jujuy	2017–18	Primera B Nacional	—		1	0	1	0
Gimnasia Jujuy	2018–19	Primera B Nacional	22	5	—		22	5
Gimnasia Jujuy	2019–20	Primera B Nacional	7	2	—		7	2
Gimnasia Jujuy	2022	Primera B Nacional	1	0	—		1	0
Gimnasia Jujuy	Total		30	7	1	0	31	7
Talleres	2021	Primera División	0	0	0	0	0	0
Talleres	2022	Primera División	0	0	0	0	0	0
Talleres	Total		0	0	0	0	0	0
Deportivo Morón	2022	Primera B Nacional	15	0	0	0	15	0
Quilmes	2023	Primera B Nacional	1	0	—		1	0
Los Andes	2023	Primera B Metropolitana	17	3	—		17	3
Career total			63	10	1	0	64	10
