= Gonzalo Castillejos =

Argentine footballer

Personal information
- Full name: Gonzalo Rubén Castillejos
- Date of birth: March 5, 1986 (age 40)
- Place of birth: Leones, Argentina
- Height: 1.84 m (6 ft 0 in)
- Position: Forward

Youth career
- 2001–2007: Rosario Central

Senior career*
Years	Team	Apps	(Gls)
2007–2009	Rosario Central	21	(4)
2010–2016	Lanús	61	(12)
2011–2012	→ Rosario Central (loan)	43	(27)
2013	→ Barcelona SC (loan)	10	(1)
2013–2014	→ Rosario Central (loan)	15	(2)
2014–2016	→ Argentinos Juniors (loan)	32	(3)
2016–2017	Ferro	38	(15)
2017–2018	Apollon Smyrnis	19	(1)
2018–2019	San Martín SJ	8	(1)
2019–2020	Gimnasia Jujuy	18	(7)
2020–2021	Instituto	14	(1)
2022	Sarmiento de Leones		
- * Club domestic league appearances and goals as of 20:26, 15 January 2021 (UTC)

Gonzalo Rubén Castillejos (born 5 March 1986 in Leones) is an Argentine footballer, who plays as a forward.

== Club career ==
=== Rosario Central ===
Castillejos, begun his playing career with Rosario Central of the Argentine Primera División. He made his debut on 31 August 2007 in a 1–1 home draw with Olimpo. He scored his first goal for the club on 8 September 2009 in a 2–1 home win against River Plate.

=== Lanús ===
In January 2010, the striker signed for Lanús, that paid around 2 million US dollars. He scored two goals on his debut to help Lanús to come back to win 3–2 against Huracán on their opening fixture of the 2010 Clausura. The next weekend he scored one goal versus Boca Juniors, but his team lost 1–3 that night. On 7 April Lanús was losing 0–1 against Chacarita Juniors, but Castillejos scored 2 goals in the last 4 minutes of the match.
