= Fabián Muñoz (Argentine footballer) =

Argentine footballer

Personal information
- Full name: Fabián Miguel Muñoz
- Date of birth: 3 November 1991 (age 35)
- Place of birth: Rufino, Argentina
- Height: 1.75 m (5 ft 9 in)
- Position: Winger

Youth career
- Newell's Old Boys

Senior career*
Years	Team	Apps	(Gls)
2011–2015	Newell's Old Boys	56	(10)
2015–2016	Arsenal de Sarandí	23	(0)
2016–2017	Panetolikos	28	(4)
2017–2018	Temperley	8	(0)
2018–2019	Gimnasia Jujuy	16	(0)
2019–2020	Alki Oroklini	11	(0)
2020	Bylis Ballsh	6	(0)
2021	Villa Mitre	14	(1)
- * Club domestic league appearances and goals

Fabián Muñoz (born 3 November 1991) is a retired Argentine football winger.

== Career ==
=== Club career ===
Muñoz made his professional debut in the Argentine Primera División with Newell's Old Boys in 2011. On 30 January 2016, Muñoz signed an 18-month contract with Panetolikos.

On 12 July 2019 Muñoz joined Cypriot club Alki Oroklini. He left the club at the end of January 2020, to join Albanian club KF Bylis Ballsh on a deal until 31 May 2020. He left the club when his contract expired.

In 2021, he returned to Argentine football, signing with Villa Mitre. After the 2021 season at Villa Mitre, 30-year-old Muñoz decided to hang up his boots and started in 2022 as a football agent.
