= Daniel Juárez (footballer, born 1975) =

Argentine footballer

Daniel Juárez (football player)
Personal information
- Full name: Daniel Alejandro Juárez
- Date of birth: January 7, 1975 (age 51)
- Place of birth: San Salvador de Jujuy, Argentina
- Height: 1.80 m (5 ft 11 in)
- Positions: Midfielder; attacking midfielder; forward

Team information
- Current team: Unemployed

Youth career
- 1991–1992: Newell's Old Boys
- 1992–1996: Gimnasia (J)

Senior career*
Years	Team	Apps	(Gls)
1996–2000	Gimnasia (J)	99	(7)
2000–2001	Huracán	23	(2)
2001–2003	Gimnasia (J)	63	(16)
2003–2004	Huracán	31	(3)
2004–2006	Gimnasia (J)	52	(11)
2006–2008	Wilstermann	84	(32)
2008–2009	LD Alajuelense	17	(3)
- * Club domestic league appearances and goals as of January 04, 2009 ‡ National team caps and goals as of January 04, 2009

Daniel Alejandro Juárez (born 7 January 1975, in San Salvador de Jujuy) is a footballer.

== Club career ==
Juarez has played most of his career in the Primera División Argentina, almost entirely with Gimnasia y Esgrima de Jujuy. He then spent two seasons with Club Jorge Wilstermann in Bolivia. In September 2008, Juarez joined Alajuelense in the Primera División de Costa Rica. On March 19, 2009, he was fired due to his poor performance with LD Alajuelense.
