= Facundo Callejo =

Argentine footballer (born 1992)

Personal information
- Full name: Facundo Julián Callejo
- Date of birth: 2 July 1992 (age 34)
- Place of birth: Tandil, Argentina
- Height: 1.70 m (5 ft 7 in)
- Position: Forward

Team information
- Current team: Cusco
- Number: 9

Youth career
- Santamarina
- 2010–2013: Colón

Senior career*
Years	Team	Apps	(Gls)
2013–2017	Colón	12	(1)
2014	→ Gimnasia y Esgrima (loan)	21	(9)
2015	→ Liga de Loja (loan)	17	(5)
2016	→ Patronato (loan)	1	(0)
2016–2017	→ Santamarina (loan)	25	(2)
2018	Carabobo	8	(1)
2018–2019	Gimnasia y Esgrima	14	(0)
2019–2020	All Boys	12	(1)
2020–2021	Pannafpliakos		
2021–2022	Temperley	41	(6)
2023	C.S.D. Macará	16	(6)
2024	CA Nacional Potosí	12	(4)
2024	S.D. Aucas	14	(3)
2025–	Cusco FC	33	(25)
- * Club domestic league appearances and goals as of 1 December 2025

Facundo Julián Callejo (born 2 July 1992) is an Argentine professional footballer who plays as a forward for Peruvian Primera División side Cusco FC.

== Career ==
Callejo had youth spells with Santamarina and Colón, he made the step into first-team football with Colón where he scored two goals in fifteen matches for them between 2013 and 2017; his debut came on 27 April 2013 in an Argentine Primera División win at home to Arsenal de Sarandí. During his time with Colón, Callejo spent time out on loan on four occasions. In January 2014, Callejo joined Gimnasia y Esgrima in Primera B Nacional. He played twenty-one times with the club and scored nine goals, including the first of his professional career in March versus Villa San Carlos.

After returning to Colón in June 2014, Callejo joined Liga de Loja of the Ecuadorian Serie A in January 2015. He scored on his Liga de Loja debut on 31 January, scoring in a 1–1 vs. Barcelona. Four more goals in a total of seventeen games followed. 2016 saw Callejo join Argentine Primera División side Patronato on a temporary basis, but he returned to Colón at the start of 2016–17 after only two matches. For the rest of 2016–17, Callejo signed for Santamarina of Primera B Nacional. He played twenty-five games and netted two goals vs. Independiente Rivadavia and Juventud Unida respectively.

On 16 January 2018, Callejo joined Venezuelan Primera División side Carabobo on a contract until December 2018. However, six months later, following one goal in eight Carabobo appearances, Callejo returned to Argentina to rejoin former loan club Gimnasia y Esgrima.

== Career statistics ==
As of 29 June 2018.

Club statistics
Club	Season	League			Cup (Note: Includes the Copa Argentina and Copa Venezuela)		League Cup		Continental (Note: Includes the Copa Libertadores and Copa Sudamericana)		Other (Note: Includes the Argentine Primera División play-offs)		Total	
Club	Season	Division	Apps	Goals	Apps	Goals	Apps	Goals	Apps	Goals	Apps	Goals	Apps	Goals
Colón	2012–13	Argentine Primera División	1	0	0	0	—		0	0	0	0	1	0
Colón	2013–14	Argentine Primera División	1	0	0	0	—		—		0	0	1	0
Colón	2014	Primera B Nacional	7	1	2	1	—		—		0	0	9	2
Colón	2015	Argentine Primera División	3	0	0	0	—		—		3 (Note: Three appearances in 2015 Argentine Primera División play-offs)	1 (Note: One goal in 2015 Argentine Primera División play-offs)	6	1
Colón	2016	Argentine Primera División	0	0	0	0	—		—		0	0	0	0
Colón	2016–17	Argentine Primera División	0	0	0	0	—		—		0	0	0	0
Colón	2017–18	Argentine Primera División	0	0	0	0	—		0	0	0	0	0	0
Colón	Total		12	1	2	1	—		0	0	3	1	17	3
Gimnasia y Esgrima (loan)	2013–14	Primera B Nacional	21	9	0	0	—		—		0	0	21	9
Liga de Loja (loan)	2015	Serie A	17	5	—		—		0	0	0	0	17	5
Patronato (loan)	2016	Argentine Primera División	1	0	0	0	—		—		0	0	1	0
Patronato (loan)	2016–17	Argentine Primera División	0	0	1	0	—		—		0	0	1	0
Patronato (loan)	Total		1	0	1	0	—		—		0	0	2	0
Santamarina (loan)	2016–17	Primera B Nacional	25	2	1	0	—		—		0	0	26	2
Carabobo	2018	Venezuelan Primera División	8	1	0	0	—		0	0	0	0	8	1
Gimnasia y Esgrima	2018–19	Primera B Nacional	0	0	0	0	—		0	0	0	0	0	0
Career total			84	18	4	1	—		0	0	3	1	91	20
