= Mario Sciacqua =

Argentine footballer and manager

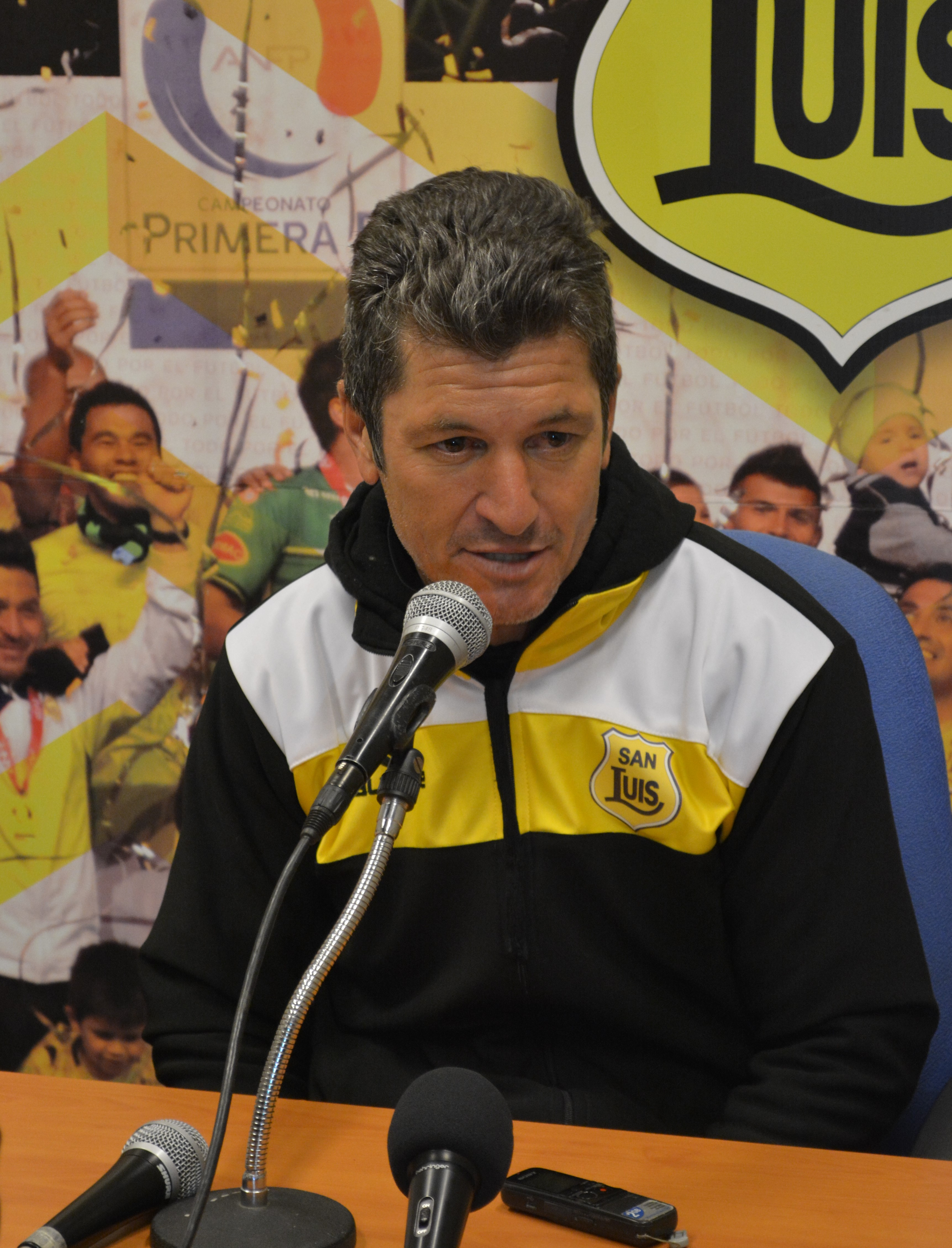
- Sciacqua as manager of San Luis in 2015

Personal information
- Full name: Mario Alfredo Sciacqua
- Date of birth: 30 August 1970 (age 56)
- Place of birth: Beravebu, Argentina
- Position: Winger

Youth career
- Newell's Old Boys

Senior career*
Years	Team	Apps	(Gls)
1990	Deportivo Municipal		
1992–1993	Colón	31	(4)
1993–1994	Arsenal de Sarandí	11	(2)
1994–1995	Deportivo Municipal	29	(8)
1995–1996	Melgar	38	(11)

Managerial career
- 2003: Ciclón Racing (youth)
- 2003: Ciclón Racing
- 2004–2006: Colón (youth)
- 2004: Colón (interim)
- 2005: Colón (interim)
- 2011–2012: Colón
- 2013: Colón
- 2014: Gimnasia de Jujuy
- 2015: San Luis
- 2016: Gimnasia de Jujuy
- 2017: Olimpo
- 2017–2018: Quilmes
- 2018–2019: Patronato
- 2020: Godoy Cruz
- 2021: Sarmiento de Junín
- 2022–2023: Quilmes
- 2024: Atlanta
- 2024–2025: Mitre SdE
- 2025: Deportes La Serena
- * Club domestic league appearances and goals

Mario Alfredo Sciacqua (born 30 August 1970) is an Argentine football manager and former player who played as a right winger.

== Coaching career ==
Sciacqua has also managed Colón, Gimnasia Jujuy, Olimpo, Quilmes and Patronato in Argentina, as well as San Luis in Chile.

In September 2025, Sciacqua returned to Chile after his stint with San Luis de Quillota in 2015 and signed with Deportes La Serena in the Primera División.

== Honours ==
Sarmiento de Junín

- Primera B Nacional: 2020
