= Estadio Comandante Andrés Guacurarí =

Football stadium in Garupá, Argentina

Andrés Guacurarí Stadium
- Estadio Andrés Guacurarí
- Sucursal del Cielo
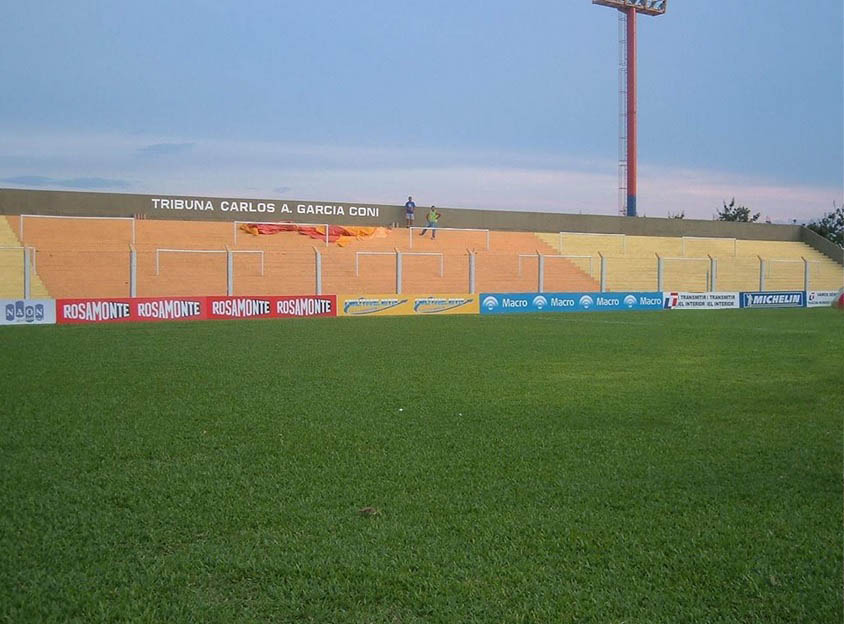
- The stadium in 2015
- Interactive map of Andrés Guacurarí Stadium
- Full name: Estadio Comandante Andrés Guacurarí
- Address: Tambo 0 s/n Garupá; Argentina
- Owner: Crucero del Norte
- Capacity: 15,000
- Type: Stadium
- Surface: Grama bahiana
- Field size: 110 x 75 m

Construction
- Opened: 2003; 23 years ago
- Expanded: 2014

Tenant
- Crucero del Norte (2003–present)

Estadio Comandante Andrés Guacurarí is a football stadium located in the city of Garupá in the Misiones Province of Argentina. It is owned and operated by local club Crucero del Norte and was opened in 2003. The stadium has a capacity of 15,000 spectators.

The stadium was named after Andrés Guazurary (1778?–?), a military and caudillo of the province who served in the Army of the North of Manuel Belgrano, and in the Artiguista Army during the Portuguese conquest of the Banda Oriental, as General Commander. He died in Rio de Janeiro in 1825. Guazurary had also a brief tenure as governor of the province between 1815 and 1816.

== Overview ==
The stadium has a capacity of 15,000 spectators and the field's dimensions are 110 x 75, which makes Estadio Andrés Guacurarí have the largest football pitch among the clubs affiliated to AFA that play official competitions organised by the body.

After an initiative from the major of Posadas Orlando Franco and the Governor of Misiones Maurice Closs, the stadium was about to be given the name "Cristina Fernández de Kirchner" in June 2013. The ceremony would be conducted before a friendly match between Crucero del Norte and Paraguayan Club Libertad. Nevertheless, the initiative was dismissed by Fernández herself, who rejected the idea. One year later, new stalls were built in the stadium, expanding its capacity to 15,000 people.
