= Rodrigo Morales (footballer, born August 1994) =

Venezuelan footballer

Personal information
- Full name: Rodrigo Alonso Morales Godoy
- Date of birth: 5 August 1994 (age 32)
- Place of birth: Venezuela
- Height: 1.72 m (5 ft 7 1/2 in)
- Positions: Defender; midfielder

Team information
- Current team: El Vigía

Senior career*
Years	Team	Apps	(Gls)
2014–2016	Estudiantes de Mérida	9	(0)
2017–	El Vigía		
- * Club domestic league appearances and goals

Rodrigo Alonso Morales Godoy (born 5 August 1994) is a Venezuelan professional footballer who plays as a defender or midfielder for El Vigía.

== Career ==
Morales' career began with Estudiantes de Mérida. He made his professional bow in the Primera División on 26 October 2014, with the player being substituted on for Javier Guillén after seventy-three minutes of a match with Llaneros. Two further substitute appearances in league and cup followed during the 2015 campaign against Mineros de Guayana and Deportivo Táchira, before Morales started for the first time in February 2016 versus Petare; which was one of seven matches in 2016 as Estudiantes placed thirteenth overall. In 2017, Morales joined El Vigía of the Segunda División.

== Career statistics ==
As of 14 January 2019.

Club statistics
Club	Season	League			Cup		Continental		Other		Total	
Club	Season	Division	Apps	Goals	Apps	Goals	Apps	Goals	Apps	Goals	Apps	Goals
Estudiantes de Mérida	2014–15	Primera División	1	0	0	0	—		0	0	1	0
Estudiantes de Mérida	2015	Primera División	1	0	1	0	—		0	0	2	0
Estudiantes de Mérida	2016	Primera División	7	0	0	0	—		0	0	7	0
Career total			9	0	1	0	—		0	0	10	0
