= Garupá =

Coordinates: 27°29′S 55°50′W

- Municipality and village
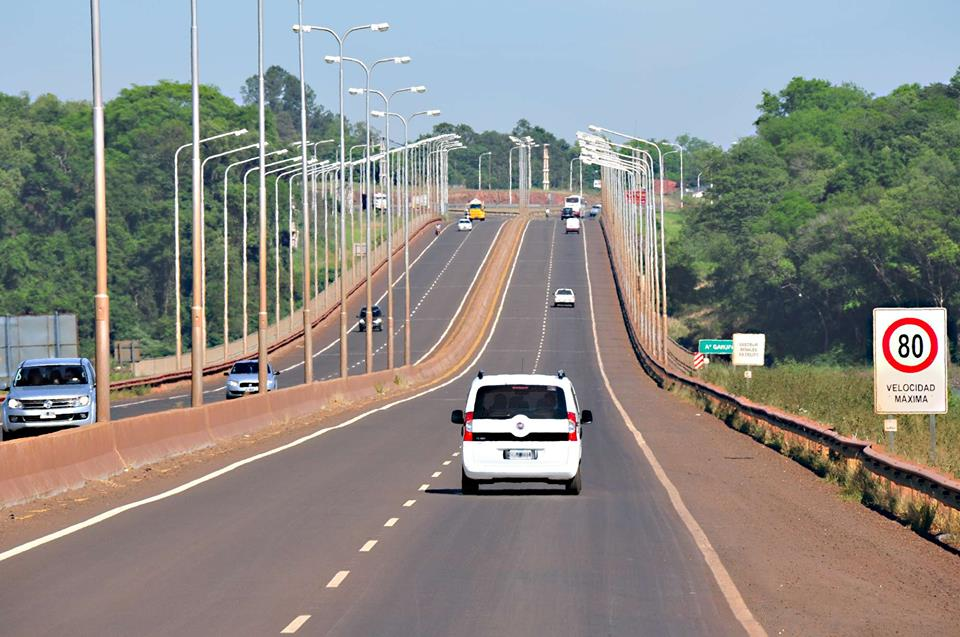
- Interactive map of Garupá
- Country: Argentina
- Province: Misiones
- Department: Capital

Government
  - Intendant: Luis Armando Ripoll
- Elevation: 335 ft (102 m)

Population
  - Total: 28,814
- Time zone: UTC−3 (ART)

Garupá is a village and municipality in Misiones Province in north-eastern Argentina. It takes part of the Great Posadas (urban agglomerated between Posadas and Garupá), and most of the population works in the provincial capital.
