= 2012–13 Primera B Nacional =

27th season of the second-tier football league in Argentina

Primera B Nacional
- Season: 2012–13
- Champions: Rosario Central (1st divisional title)
- Promoted: Rosario Central; Gimnasia y Esgrima (LP); Olimpo
- Relegated: Deportivo Merlo; Nueva Chicago
- Matches played: 380
- Goals scored: 775 (2.04 per match)
- Top goalscorer: Luis Rodriguez 20 goals

The 2012–13 Argentine Primera B Nacional was the 27th season of second division professional of football in Argentina. A total of 20 teams competed; the champion, runner-up and third-placed team were promoted to Argentine Primera División.

== Club information ==
Locations of the 2012–13 season teams outside Greater Buenos Aires.
Locations of the 2012−13 season teams within Greater Buenos Aires.

Club	City	Stadium
Aldosivi	Mar del Plata	José María Minella
Almirante Brown	Isidro Casanova	Fragata Presidente Sarmiento
Atlético Tucumán	Tucumán	Monumental José Fierro
Banfield	Banfield	Florencio Solá
Boca Unidos	Corrientes	José Antonio Romero Feris
Crucero del Norte	Garupá	Comandante Andrés Guacurarí
Defensa y Justicia	Florencio Varela	Norberto "Tito" Tomaghello
Deportivo Merlo	Merlo	José Manuel Moreno
Douglas Haig	Pergamino	Miguel Morales
Ferro Carril Oeste	Buenos Aires	Arquitecto Ricardo Etcheverry
Gimnasia y Esgrima (J)	Jujuy	23 de Agosto
Gimnasia y Esgrima (LP)	La Plata	Juan Carmelo Zerillo
Huracán	Buenos Aires	Tomás Adolfo Ducó
Independiente Rivadavia	Mendoza	Bautista Gargantini
Instituto	Córdoba	Presidente Perón
Nueva Chicago	Buenos Aires	Nueva Chicago
Olimpo	Bahía Blanca	Roberto Natalio Carminatti
Patronato	Paraná	Presbítero Bartolomé Grella
Rosario Central	Rosario	Dr. Lisandro de la Torre
Sarmiento (J)	Junín	Eva Perón

== Standings ==
Pos	Team	Pld	W	D	L	GF	GA	GD	Pts	Promotion or relegation
1	Rosario Central (C, P)	38	22	8	8	51	29	+22	74	Promotion to the 2013–14 Primera División
2	Gimnasia y Esgrima (LP) (P)	38	21	10	7	53	25	+28	73	Promotion to the 2013–14 Primera División
3	Olimpo (P)	38	18	12	8	43	23	+20	66	Promotion to the 2013–14 Primera División
4	Banfield	38	16	10	12	45	39	+6	58	
5	Sarmiento (J)	38	15	13	10	40	34	+6	58	
6	Defensa y Justicia	38	15	12	11	45	46	−1	57	
7	Patronato	38	15	11	12	42	40	+2	56	
8	Huracán	38	15	9	14	44	41	+3	54	
9	Atlético Tucumán	38	12	15	11	45	40	+5	51	
10	Gimnasia y Esgrima (J)	38	12	14	12	25	29	−4	50	
11	Douglas Haig	38	13	10	15	43	44	−1	49	
12	Independiente Rivadavia	38	12	12	14	33	36	−3	48	
13	Almirante Brown	38	11	13	14	43	45	−2	46	
14	Boca Unidos	38	12	9	17	32	37	−5	45	
15	Crucero del Norte	38	11	12	15	31	40	−9	45	
16	Aldosivi	38	10	14	14	37	45	−8	44	
17	Ferro Carril Oeste	38	9	16	13	29	32	−3	43	
18	Instituto	38	8	15	15	33	41	−8	39	
19	Deportivo Merlo	38	10	7	21	30	57	−27	37	
20	Nueva Chicago	38	7	10	21	33	54	−21	31	

Updated to match(es) played on 9 June 2013. Source: AFA
Rules for classification: 1st points; 2nd goal difference; 3rd goals scored; 4th head-to-head points; 5th head-to-head goal difference; 6th head-to-head goals scored. This does not apply to determining the champion. If two or more teams had been tied in point at the end of the tournament, a playoff would have been held at a neutral venue within 72 hours for the championship
(C) Champions; (P) Promoted

== Results ==
Home \ Away	ALD	ALM	ATU	BAN	BOU	CRU	DYJ	MER	DOU	FCO	GJU	GLP	HUR	INS	IRV	NCH	OLI	PAT	RCE	SAR
Aldosivi		4–2	1–1	1–1	2–0	0–0	1–1	4–1	2–3	1–4	1–1	0–1	3–1	1–0	0–2	2–1	0–3	0–0	0–1	1–1
Almirante Brown	1–1		0–1	3–1	0–1	0–0	1–1	2–0	1–3	1–0	0–1	0–0	0–4	2–0	0–0	2–0	1–3	1–2	0–0	2–2
Atlético Tucumán	0–0	4–3		1–1	2–3	2–0	1–2	2–1	3–2	3–0	1–1	1–1	1–1	2–0	0–0	2–1	2–0	0–1	3–4	0–1
Banfield	1–1	3–1	0–0		0–0	2–0	2–2	3–1	2–0	1–0	2–0	0–1	1–2	0–0	3–1	3–1	0–3	0–0	2–1	2–0
Boca Unidos	3–1	0–0	0–0	2–0		1–1	1–2	2–0	3–1	3–1	0–0	0–1	0–1	1–1	1–0	2–0	0–1	0–1	1–2	0–0
Crucero del Norte	2–1	0–2	1–0	1–0	3–0		0–0	2–0	2–1	1–1	0–0	1–1	1–2	1–1	0–2	1–0	1–0	0–1	0–1	1–0
Defensa y Justicia	0–2	1–1	2–5	2–4	2–1	0–0		2–0	2–0	0–2	1–0	1–0	2–1	0–3	2–3	4–2	1–0	0–0	0–1	1–1
Deportivo Merlo	1–2	2–6	0–1	0–2	1–0	1–0	2–1		1–1	2–1	2–1	1–1	1–2	1–1	1–0	0–1	1–0	1–2	1–2	2–3
Douglas Haig	1–0	1–1	1–0	0–1	2–3	1–0	0–0	1–2		0–1	3–1	0–1	1–0	2–1	3–0	0–0	0–2	2–1	1–1	1–1
Ferro Carril Oeste	0–1	0–0	1–1	3–0	2–1	0–2	0–2	0–0	0–0		0–0	0–1	1–1	1–1	0–0	3–0	0–0	0–1	0–0	1–1
Gimnasia y Esgrima (J)	0–0	1–0	0–0	2–1	1–0	3–1	1–0	2–0	0–2	0–0		2–0	0–2	2–3	2–1	1–0	0–0	2–1	0–3	0–0
Gimnasia y Esgrima (LP)	0–0	0–3	0–0	1–0	2–0	5–0	1–3	2–0	3–1	0–1	1–0		1–0	0–0	3–0	4–0	5–0	3–1	1–0	3–0
Huracán	1–1	2–1	1–1	1–1	0–2	3–1	0–1	1–0	2–1	1–0	1–0	2–4		2–2	0–1	1–0	1–2	0–0	0–1	1–0
Instituto	2–0	2–3	0–0	1–2	0–0	1–1	1–0	0–0	0–1	0–1	0–1	0–2	1–0		0–0	2–3	0–1	1–0	1–0	1–3
Independiente Rivadavia	2–0	3–0	1–0	0–2	3–0	2–1	1–1	0–1	1–0	1–1	0–0	1–1	0–1	1–1		2–0	0–1	0–1	1–3	1–0
Nueva Chicago	0–0	1–0	0–1	1–2	0–0	0–0	1–2	5–1	4–4	2–3	0–0	1–1	0–3	0–0	2–0		0–0	2–0	1–2	0–1
Olimpo	4–0	0–0	2–1	0–0	0–1	0–0	1–0	0–0	0–0	2–0	1–0	0–3	3–2	1–1	2–0	2–1		1–1	2–0	1–0
Patronato	0–3	0–0	1–1	2–0	1–0	3–5	4–0	1–2	1–0	0–0	0–0	2–3	3–0	3–2	1–1	0–2	1–0		2–1	1–1
Rosario Central	2–0	0–1	3–1	2–0	1–0	2–1	1–1	1–0	1–3	1–1	2–0	2–0	0–0	1–0	2–2	2–0	2–2	2–0		0–1
Sarmiento (J)	1–0	1–2	4–0	2–0	2–0	1–0	2–2	0–0	0–0	1–0	0–0	1–0	2–1	2–3	0–0	1–0	0–3	4–3	0–1	

Updated to match(es) played on June 17, 2013. Source: AFA
Legend: Blue = home team win; Yellow = draw; Red = away team win.

== Relegation ==
Clubs with an indirect affiliation with Argentine Football Association are relegated to the Torneo Argentino A, while clubs directly affiliated face relegation to Primera B Metropolitana. Clubs with direct affiliation are all from Greater Buenos Aires, with the exception of Rosario Central, Newell's Old Boys, Central Córdoba and Argentino de Rosario, all from Rosario, and Unión and Colón from Santa Fe. The bottom two teams of this table face relegation regardless of their affiliation status.

Pos	Team	2010–11 Pts	2011–12 Pts	2012–13 Pts	Total Pts	Total Pld	Avg	Relegation	Affiliation
1	Olimpo	—	—	66	66	38	1.737		Indirect
2	Rosario Central	50	69	74	193	114	1.693		Direct
3	Gimnasia y Esgrima (LP)	—	54	73	127	76	1.671		Direct
4	Sarmiento (J)	—	—	58	58	38	1.526		Direct
5	Banfield	—	—	58	58	38	1.526		Direct
6	Patronato	50	56	56	162	114	1.421		Indirect
7	Instituto	51	70	39	160	114	1.404		Indirect
8	Defensa y Justicia	43	54	57	154	114	1.351		Direct
9	Boca Unidos	52	57	45	154	114	1.351		Indirect
10	Almirante Brown	52	55	46	153	114	1.342		Direct
11	Huracán	—	46	54	100	76	1.316		Direct
12	Aldosivi	52	53	44	149	114	1.307		Indirect
13	Douglas Haig	—	—	49	49	38	1.289		Indirect
14	Ferro Carril Oeste	47	56	43	146	114	1.281		Direct
15	Atlético Tucumán	51	42	51	144	114	1.263		Indirect
16	Gimnasia y Esgrima (J)	54	34	50	138	114	1.211		Indirect
17	Crucero del Norte	—	—	45	45	38	1.184		Indirect
18	Independiente Rivadavia	40	45	48	133	114	1.167		Indirect
19	Deportivo Merlo (R)	51	43	37	131	114	1.149	Primera B Metropolitana	Direct
20	Nueva Chicago (R)	—	—	31	31	38	0.816	Primera B Metropolitana	Direct

Updated to games played in June 2013.

== Season statistics ==
=== Top scorers ===
Rank	Player	Club	Goals
1	(Argentina) Luis Rodriguez	Atlético Tucumán	20
2	(Argentina) Facundo Pereyra	Gimnasia y Esgrima (LP)	15
2	(Argentina) Andrés Chávez	Banfield	15
2	(Argentina) Cristian Milla	Defensa y Justicia	15
5	(Argentina) Pablo Mazza	Douglas Haig	12
5	(Argentina) Jeronimo Barrales	Huracán	12
5	(Argentina) Cristian Chávez	Almirante Brown	12
8	(Argentina) Mauricio Carrasco	Patronato	11
9	(Argentina) Javier Toledo	Rosario Central	10

== See also ==
- 2012–13 in Argentine football
