= Crucero del Norte =

Argentine sports club

- Full name: Club Mutual Crucero del Norte
- Nickname: Colectivero (the bus driver)
- Founded: 28 June 2003; 23 years ago
- Ground: Andrés Guacurarí, Garupá, Misiones Province
- Capacity: 15,000
- Chairman: Diego Allou
- Manager: Adrián Álvarez
- League: Torneo Federal A
- 2024: Torneo Federal A Zone 4,7th
- Website: www.clubcrucerodelnorte.com.ar
Home colours	Away colours	Third colours

Club Mutual Crucero del Norte (simply known as Crucero del Norte) is an Argentine sports club based in Garupá, Misiones Province. The club was founded in 2003 by a long-distance bus company which gave its name to the institution. Although the club is mostly known for its association football team, other sports such as field hockey, paddle tennis and tennis are hosted.

After many seasons playing in the Torneo Argentino A, the football team was promoted to Primera B Nacional after defeating Guillermo Brown via playoff. They currently play in Primera B Nacional.

The main Crucero's rival is Guaraní Antonio Franco of the same city.

== History ==
The club was founded in 1989 by the owners of Argentine bus company "Crucero del Norte", the Koropeski family. They had been encouraged by the company's employees, who were big fans of football and strong supporters of the indoor soccer team of Crucero del Norte.

During its first years of existence, Crucero del Norte played its home games at Bartolomé Mitre de Posadas stadium. The club inaugurated its own field in 2003. Crucero debuted in the Liga Posadeña de Fútbol (Posadas football league), promoting to play the 2005 edition of Torneo Argentino C. In 2005 the team promoted to Torneo Argentino B where it remained until 2009.

On 14 June 2009, Crucero del Norte got promotion to Torneo Argentino A after defeating Marplatense team Alvarado at the finals (with scores of 1–0 in Posadas and 0–0 as visitor).

In January 2011, the squad won its first international tournament, the Copa Víctor Hugo Zayas, played in Encarnación, Paraguay after beating local teams Universal (1–0) and Independiente de Campo Grande (5–4 via penalty shoot-out after the 90' ended in a tie). The most recent achievement was the promotion to the second division of Argentine football, Primera B Nacional, defeating Guillermo Brown de Puerto Madryn via playoff.

== Honours ==
- Liga Posadeña de Fútbol (1): 2004 Apertura
