= 2011–12 Primera B Nacional =

26th season of the second-tier football league in Argentina

Primera B Nacional
- Season: 2011–12
- Champions: River Plate (1st divisional title)
- Promoted: River Plate; Quilmes
- Relegated: Guillermo Brown; Chacarita Juniors; Desamparados; Atlanta
- Matches played: 380
- Goals scored: 835 (2.2 per match)
- Top goalscorer: Gonzalo Castillejos (26 goals)
- Biggest home win: River Plate 7–1 Atlanta (5 October 2011); Quilmes 7–1 Independiente Rivadavia (24 February 2012)
- Biggest away win: Gimnasia y Esgrima (J) 1–4 River Plate (5 November 2011); Guillermo Brown 1–4 River Plate (19 November 2011)
- Longest winning run: 7 - Rosario Central (9 April – 19 May)
- Longest unbeaten run: 19 - Instituto (10 September – 3 March)
- Longest losing run: 12 - Gimnasia y Esgrima (J) (19 October – 11 February)

The 2011–12 Argentine Primera B Nacional was the 26th season of second division professional of football in Argentina. A total of 20 teams competed; the champion and runner-up were promoted to Argentine Primera División.

== Club information ==
Locations of the 2011–12 season teams outside Greater Buenos Aires.
Locations of the 2011−12 season teams within Greater Buenos Aires.

Club	City	Stadium
Aldosivi	Mar del Plata	José María Minella
Almirante Brown	Isidro Casanova	Fragata Presidente Sarmiento
Atlanta	Buenos Aires	Don León Kolbovski
Atlético Tucumán	Tucumán	Monumental José Fierro
Boca Unidos	Corrientes	José Antonio Romero Feris
Chacarita Juniors	Villa Maipú	Chacarita Juniors
Defensa y Justicia	Florencio Varela	Norberto "Tito" Tomaghello
Deportivo Merlo	Merlo	José Manuel Moreno
Desamparados	San Juan	El Serpentario
Ferro Carril Oeste	Buenos Aires	Arquitecto Ricardo Etcheverry
Gimnasia y Esgrima	Jujuy	23 de Agosto
Gimnasia y Esgrima	La Plata	Juan Carmelo Zerillo
Guillermo Brown	Puerto Madryn	Raúl Conti
Huracán	Buenos Aires	Tomás Adolfo Ducó
Independiente Rivadavia	Mendoza	Bautista Gargantini
Instituto	Córdoba	Presidente Perón
Patronato	Paraná	Presbítero Bartolomé Grella
Quilmes	Quilmes	Centenario Dr. José Luis Meiszner
River Plate	Buenos Aires	Monumental Antonio V. Liberti
Rosario Central	Rosario	Dr. Lisandro de la Torre

== Standings ==
Pos	Team	Pld	W	D	L	GF	GA	GD	Pts	Promotion or qualification
1	River Plate (C, P)	38	20	13	5	66	28	+38	73	Primera División
2	Quilmes (P)	38	20	12	6	62	21	+41	72	Primera División
3	Instituto (Q)	38	19	13	6	56	28	+28	70	Promotion Playoff Matches
4	Rosario Central (Q)	38	20	9	9	49	33	+16	69	Promotion Playoff Matches
5	Boca Unidos	38	16	9	13	55	48	+7	57	
6	Patronato	38	15	11	12	42	39	+3	56	
7	Ferro Carril Oeste	38	14	14	10	29	28	+1	56	
8	Almirante Brown	38	14	13	11	36	30	+6	55	
9	Gimnasia y Esgrima (LP)	38	14	12	12	38	33	+5	54	
10	Defensa y Justicia	38	14	12	12	50	50	0	54	
11	Aldosivi	38	13	14	11	50	47	+3	53	
12	Huracán	38	12	10	16	43	51	−8	46	
13	Independiente Rivadavia	38	11	12	15	36	51	−15	45	
14	Deportivo Merlo	38	10	13	15	28	38	−10	43	
15	Atlético Tucumán	38	11	9	18	33	48	−15	42	
16	Guillermo Brown	38	9	11	18	46	63	−17	38	
17	Desamparados	38	9	10	19	34	55	−21	37	
18	Gimnasia y Esgrima (J)	38	8	10	20	33	51	−18	34	
19	Atlanta	38	6	16	16	28	50	−22	34	
20	Chacarita Juniors	38	6	15	17	24	46	−22	33	

Updated to match(es) played on June 23, 2012. Source: AFA
Rules for classification: 1st points; 2nd goal difference; 3rd goals scored; 4th head-to-head points; 5th head-to-head goal difference; 6th head-to-head goals scored. This does not apply to determining the champion. If two or more teams had been tied in point at the end of the tournament, a playoff would have been held at a neutral venue within 72 hours for the championship
(C) Champions; (P) Promoted; (Q) Qualified for the phase indicated

== Promotion/relegation playoff Legs Primera División-Primera B Nacional ==
The 3rd and 4th placed of the table played with the 18th and the 17th placed of the Relegation Table of 2011–12 Primera División.

Team 1	Agg.	Team 2	1st leg	2nd leg
Relegation/promotion playoff 1
Rosario Central	0–0	San Martín (SJ)	0–0	0–0
Relegation/promotion playoff 2
Instituto	1–3	San Lorenzo	0–2	1–1

- San Martín (SJ) remained in the Primera División after a 0-0 aggregate tie by virtue of a "sports advantage". In case of a tie in goals, the team from the Primera División gets to stay in it.
- San Lorenzo remained in the Primera División by winning the playoff.

== Results ==
Home \ Away	ALD	ALM	ATL	ATU	BU	CHA	D&J	MER	DES	FCO	GJU	GLP	GBR	HUR	INS	IRV	PAT	QUI	RIV	RCE
Aldosivi		0–0	3–0	0–0	2–1	1–0	0–0	1–0	0–0	0–1	4–3	1–1	5–0	5–1	2–2	2–0	1–0	0–0	1–1	1–2
Almirante Brown	1–1		2–0	0–1	3–0	0–0	2–0	1–0	4–0	1–0	2–1	0–1	1–1	2–1	0–0	2–0	1–0	0–1	1–1	2–1
Atlanta	1–1	0–0		1–1	1–1	0–0	1–1	0–1	1–2	2–0	0–0	0–0	2–0	0–2	0–4	1–2	0–0	0–1	1–0	0–0
Atlético Tucumán	2–2	1–0	0–0		2–3	1–1	0–1	1–0	1–1	0–1	0–2	0–2	2–1	2–0	0–4	0–1	1–3	0–4	2–4	2–1
Boca Unidos	2–0	0–1	1–0	2–1		0–0	4–1	1–1	2–1	1–1	1–0	2–1	3–6	1–2	3–2	1–0	1–0	3–1	1–0	0–1
Chacarita Juniors	0–2	1–1	1–1	0–0	0–4		1–1	1–0	1–0	1–1	1–1	0–3	1–2	1–0	0–1	0–1	3–0	1–3	0–2	1–1
Defensa y Justicia	0–2	2–0	0–0	1–0	1–0	3–0		1–2	2–0	1–1	2–1	1–0	2–2	4–2	1–3	1–1	1–1	2–1	3–3	1–2
Deportivo Merlo	1–1	0–0	3–1	0–2	1–0	1–1	1–2		0–0	0–0	3–1	1–3	2–1	2–1	0–2	1–0	3–1	0–0	0–0	0–0
Desamparados	2–0	1–1	2–0	0–2	0–3	1–1	1–2	1–1		0–2	2–2	0–1	1–1	0–1	1–4	3–0	1–0	0–3	1–4	3–2
Ferro Carril Oeste	4–0	1–0	2–3	1–0	1–0	0–0	1–0	0–0	1–0		1–0	0–0	2–0	0–1	0–0	1–1	1–1	1–0	0–0	0–2
Gimnasia y Esgrima (J)	1–0	1–2	0–4	1–1	0–0	0–1	2–0	3–0	1–0	0–0		0–0	0–2	2–2	0–1	0–0	0–0	0–1	1–4	2–0
Gimnasia y Esgrima (LP)	3–3	2–0	1–2	3–2	1–1	2–0	0–1	3–0	1–1	0–1	1–0		3–2	2–1	0–0	0–0	0–0	1–1	0–0	1–0
Guillermo Brown	1–2	1–1	3–0	0–2	2–1	5–2	0–0	1–1	0–1	1–0	1–2	0–1		1–3	1–1	2–0	2–0	0–2	1–4	1–3
Huracán	3–0	1–1	2–2	1–0	2–2	1–0	2–3	1–0	2–1	1–1	0–2	2–0	1–1		0–0	3–0	0–0	1–1	1–2	0–1
Instituto	3–1	3–1	1–0	1–0	3–0	3–1	2–1	2–1	1–1	0–3	1–0	1–0	0–0	2–0		1–1	0–0	0–2	0–0	3–0
Independiente Rivadavia	2–2	3–1	0–0	0–0	1–3	1–0	2–2	1–2	1–0	3–0	4–2	2–1	1–0	0–0	1–1		0–1	0–1	1–3	2–0
Patronato	1–0	0–2	3–2	1–2	3–3	0–0	3–2	1–0	2–3	3–0	2–1	2–0	1–0	2–1	3–1	2–2		2–1	1–0	1–0
Quilmes	4–1	2–0	1–1	2–0	2–1	1–0	2–0	0–0	0–1	0–0	4–0	3–1	6–0	2–0	1–1	7–1	1–1		1–1	0–1
River Plate	1–2	2–0	7–1	0–2	2–1	1–0	2–2	3–0	3–1	3–0	1–0	2–0	2–2	2–0	1–0	3–0	1–0	0–0		1–1
Rosario Central	3–1	0–0	2–0	2–0	2–2	1–3	3–2	1–0	2–1	3–0	2–0	1–0	2–2	3–0	2–1	1–0	1–0	0–0	0–0	

Updated to match(es) played on April 1, 2012.. Source: AFA
Legend: Blue = home team win; Yellow = draw; Red = away team win.

== Relegation ==
Clubs with an indirect affiliation with Argentine Football Association are relegated to the Torneo Argentino A, while clubs directly affiliated face relegation to Primera B Metropolitana. Clubs with direct affiliation are all from Greater Buenos Aires, with the exception of Rosario Central, Newell's Old Boys, Central Córdoba and Argentino de Rosario, all from Rosario, and Unión and Colón from Santa Fe. The bottom two teams of this table face relegation regardless of their affiliation status. Apart from them, the bottom teams of each affiliation face promotion/relegation playoffs against Torneo Argentino A and Primera B Metropolitana's "Reducido" (reduced tournaments) champions. The Reducidos are played after those leagues' champions are known.

Pos	Team	2009–10 Pts	2010–11 Pts	2011–12 Pts	Total Pts	Total Pld	Avg	Relegation	Affiliation
1	River Plate	—	—	73	73	38	1.921		Direct
2	Quilmes	64	—	72	136	76	1.789		Direct
3	Instituto	60	51	70	181	114	1.588		Indirect
4	Rosario Central	—	50	69	119	76	1.566		Direct
5	Gimnasia y Esgrima (LP)	—	—	54	54	38	1.421		Direct
6	Almirante Brown	—	52	55	107	76	1.408		Direct
7	Patronato	—	50	56	106	76	1.395		Indirect
8	Boca Unidos	48	52	57	157	114	1.377		Indirect
9	Ferro Carril Oeste	49	47	56	152	114	1.333		Direct
10	Defensa y Justicia	52	43	54	149	114	1.307		Direct
11	Aldosivi	42	52	53	147	114	1.289		Indirect
12	Gimnasia y Esgrima (J)	54	54	34	142	114	1.246		Indirect
13	Deportivo Merlo	46	51	43	140	114	1.228		Direct
14	Atlético Tucumán	—	51	42	93	76	1.224		Indirect
15	Huracán	—	—	46	46	38	1.211		Direct
16	Independiente Rivadavia	47	40	45	132	114	1.158		Indirect
17	Chacarita Juniors	—	44	32	76	76	1.000	Relegation Playoff Matches	Direct
18	Guillermo Brown	—	—	38	38	38	1.000	Relegation Playoff Matches	Indirect
19	Desamparados	—	—	37	37	38	0.974	Torneo Argentino A	Indirect
20	Atlanta	—	—	34	34	38	0.895	Primera B Metropolitana	Direct

Updated to games played on June 23, 2012.

== Relegation Playoff Legs ==
Team 1	Agg.	Team 2	1st leg	2nd leg
Relegation/promotion playoff 1 (Direct affiliation vs. Primera B Metropolitana)
Nueva Chicago	2–1	Chacarita Juniors	1–0	1–1
Relegation/promotion playoff 2 (Indirect affiliation vs. Torneo Argentino A)
Crucero del Norte	1–0	Guillermo Brown	0–0	1–0

- Nueva Chicago was promoted to 2012–13 Primera B Nacional by winning the playoff and Chacarita Juniors was relegated to 2012–13 Primera B Metropolitana.
- Crucero del Norte was promoted to 2012–13 Primera B Nacional by winning the playoff and Guillermo Brown was relegated to 2012–13 Torneo Argentino A.

== Season statistics ==
=== Top scorers ===
Rank	Player	Club	Goals
1	(Argentina) Gonzalo Castillejos	Rosario Central	26
2	(Uruguay) Víctor Piriz Alves	Defensa y Justicia	20
3	(Argentina) Fernando Cavenaghi	River Plate	19
4	(Argentina) Paulo Dybala	Instituto	17
5	(Argentina) Cristian Núñez	Boca Unidos	15
6	(Argentina) Daniel Vega	Almirante Brown	14
7	(Uruguay) Martín Cauteruccio	Quilmes	13
7	(Argentina) Matías Gigli	Aldosivi	13
7	(France) David Trezeguet	River Plate	13
10	(Argentina) Miguel Caneo	Quilmes	12
10	(Argentina) Aldo Visconti	Boca Unidos	12

== See also ==
- 2011–12 in Argentine football
