= Gimnasia y Esgrima de Jujuy =

Argentine association football club

- Full name: Club Atlético Gimnasia y Esgrima de Jujuy
- Nicknames: Lobo Jujeño; Albiceleste
- Founded: 18 March 1931; 95 years ago
- Ground: Estadio 23 de Agosto (La Tacita de Plata), San Salvador de Jujuy, Argentina
- Capacity: 23,000
- President: Walter Morales
- Manager: Hernán Pellerano
- League: Primera Nacional
- 2026: Primera Nacional Zone B, 2nd of 18
- Website: gyejoficial.com.ar
Home colours	Away colours	Third colours

Club Atlético Gimnasia y Esgrima de Jujuy Spanish pronunciation: [ˈkluβ aˈtletiko ximˈnasjaj esˈɣɾima], (usually known as Gimnasia de Jujuy or just GEJ) is an Argentine sports club based in San Salvador de Jujuy, Jujuy Province. The club was founded in 1931 and is best known for its football team, which currently plays in the Primera B Nacional, the second division of the Argentine football league system.

The team is one of the most important football clubs in the North-West region of Argentina. It has spent most of its history in the second division, although it has also played in the Primera Division on many occasions. In terms of titles, it is the biggest club in the Jujuy province, with 38 in total.

== History ==
The club was founded on 18 March 1931. The first president of Gimnasia and one of the major drivers for the club's foundation was Thomas Yufra, who was president on three occasions. The current president is Fernando Yécora, who succeeded Horacio Raúl Ulloa after 20 years as head of the institution.

The first cup participation for GEJ came in the 1945 Copa de la República, which was organized by AFA. The club won its first title in that same year, which was the Liga Jujena. It won the next four regional league titles.

Gimansia made its debut in the AFA Torneo Nacional versus Boca Juniors at La Bombonera, where they lost 3–1. The other participations in the tournament were in, 1973, 1975 (it reached 4th place), 1976, 1977, 1980, 1981 (it reached the quarter-final) and 1982. It also participated in the Cup of Honor and was champion 10 times. The team took part in the first edition of the B Nacional, the 1986–87 season, achieving promotion from the Torneo del Interior by beating rivals Talleres de Perico on penalties after a 1–1 draw over 90 minutes. The manager was Vladem Lazaro Ruiz Quevedo, better known as "Delem". However, the club was relegated in 1988 back into Torneo del Interior.

Led by Salvador Ragusa, Gimnasia returned to the second division in 1993 and under Francisco Ferraro, they got another promotion in a row during the 1993–94 season, while winning the league title and returning to the top tier after a 12-year-absence. In the first season back, the club only finished one spot above the relegation zone.In the 1998 Clausura, the club finished in a record 4th place. They stayed in the top tier until the 1999–00 season, when the club was relegated to the B Nacional. They played 5 seasons in the second tier, alternating between good and bad campaigns. In the 2004 Apertura with Francisco Ferraro as head coach it finished fourth, and with Roberto Carlos Mario Gomez in the Clausura 2005 GEJ finished first in the league and in the aggregate table as well, but in the promotion playoff with Tiro Federal they lost, which meant they wouldn't become league champions and had to play another playoff. The second playoff was against powerhouse Huracán, and Gimnasia narrowly won on aggregate 1–0 to achieve promotion into the top tier.

In the Clausura 2006 Gimnasia had an excellent campaign and achieved another fourth place finish in a championship where it was the revelation club. Their top scorer in the first division was Mario Humberto Lobo with 46 goals in the seasons from 1994 to 2000 and Hernán "Rifle" Castilian was the player with the most games played in the first division, with 145 games in the seasons from 1994 to 2000. Gimnasia played in Primera until the 2008–09 season, where it finished last in the aggregate table and was directly relegated.

In the 2013–14 season, the club was almost relegated to the third division, the Torneo Federal A, but were saved on the last matchday after having been in the relegation zone for almost the entire season. Gimnasia defeated Aldosivi 3–1 with goals from Facundo Callejo, Matías Quiroga and Milton Célizand, managing to bring itself out of the relegation zone and maintain its place in Nacional B, after the losses of Almirante Brown and Brown.

== Stadium ==
The club's stadium is called "August 23" and gets its name from the date of the Jujuy Exodus. It was inaugurated on 18 March 1973 with a match against Vélez Sarsfield, which Gimnasia won 2–0. Located in the Luján neighborhood, it has a capacity for 23,000 spectators and the playing field dimensions are 105 by 78 meters, being in 2nd place behind Estadio Monumental José Fierro (#1 in 33,000) of the largest stadiums in northwestern Argentina. It was co-host of 2011 Copa America.

== Rivalries ==
Gimnasia has a direct rivalry with Altos Hornos Zapla, and matches played between the two clubs are called "Clásico Jujeño", since both clubs are from the Jujuy Province and are historically the biggest clubs in the province. However, the matches haven't been played a lot recently, since both clubs play in different divisions. Gimnasia has the historical advantage, with 54 wins over 40 wins.

The club also has a rivalry with Talleres de Perico, who are based in the Jujuy Province as well. Gimnasia has the winning advantage, with 46 won by them and 21 won by Talleres. However, as is the case with Altos Hornos Zapla, the matches between the two clubs aren't played frequently because Talleres plays in a different division than Gimnasia.

== Player statistics ==
=== Top scorers ===
Rank	Name	Goals
1	Mario H. Lobo	84
2	Gustavo Balvorín	48
3	Manuel Guerrero	40
4	Marcelo Trimarchi	37
5	Carlos Morales	36

=== Most Appearances ===
Rank	Name	Apps
1	Alejandro S. Gonzalez	300
2	Daniel Ramasco	293
3	Mario H. Lobo	254
4	Daniel Juarez	214
5	Leonardo Ferreyra	211

== Honours ==
=== National ===
- Primera B Nacional
  - Winners (1): 1993–94
- Torneo del Interior
  - Winners (5): 1986, 1989-90, 1990-91, 1991-92, 1992–93

== Current squad ==
As of 21 July 2022

Note: Flags indicate national team as defined under FIFA eligibility rules; some limited exceptions apply. Players may hold more than one non-FIFA nationality.

No.	Pos.	Nation	Player
—	GK	ARG	Emilio Di Fulvio
—	DF	PAR	Hugo Vera
—	DF	BOL	Anderson Rey
—	DF	ARG	Gastón Yabale
—	DF	ARG	Diego Magallanes (loan from Colegiales)
—	DF	ARG	Joaquín Barro
—	DF	ARG	Guillermo Cosaro
—	DF	ARG	Matías Rapetti
—	DF	ARG	Jorge Juárez
—	DF	ARG	Juan Pablo Córdoba
—	MF	ARG	Leonardo López
—	MF	ARG	Lautaro Belleggia

No.	Pos.	Nation	Player
—	MF	ARG	Axel Abet
—	MF	URU	Esteban González
—	MF	ARG	Matías Palavecino
—	MF	ARG	Santiago Rosa
—	MF	ARG	Francisco Maidana
—	MF	ARG	Ulises Virreyra
—	FW	ARG	Exequiel Beltramone (loan from Talleres)
—	FW	ARG	Leandro González
—	FW	ARG	Matías Reali
—	FW	ARG	Ulises Virreyra
—	FW	ARG	Ignacio Lobo
—	FW	ARG	Mauro Buono
—	FW	ARG	Gabriel Méndez
—	FW	ARG	Lucas Rebecchi

=== Out on loan ===
Note: Flags indicate national team as defined under FIFA eligibility rules; some limited exceptions apply. Players may hold more than one non-FIFA nationality.

No.	Pos.	Nation	Player
—	DF	ARG	Enzo Paredes (at Güemes until 31 December 2022)

== Managerial history ==
- (Argentina) Norberto Raffo (1980)
- (New Zealand) Tom Burgering (1982–1984)
- (Argentina) Mario Humberto Lobo (1986–1987), (1992–1995), (1997–2000)
- (Argentina) Gerónimo Saccardi (1999–2000)
- (Argentina) Humberto Zuccarelli (2000–2001)
- (Argentina) Héctor Arzubialde (2001–2002)
- (Argentina) Luis Manuel Blanco (2002–2003)
- (Argentina) Victor Riggio (2003–2004)
- (Argentina) Mario Gómez (2005–2006)
- (New Zealand) Tom Burgering (2006–2008)
- (Argentina) Omar Labruna (2008–2009)
- (Argentina) Héctor Arzubialde (2009–2010)
- (Argentina) Francisco Ferraro (2010–2011)
- (Argentina) Salvador Ragusa (2011)
- (Argentina) José Luis Calderón (2011–2012)
- (Argentina) Mario Gómez (2012–2013)
- (Argentina) Mario Sciacqua (2014)
- (Argentina) Sebastián Méndez (2015)
- (Argentina) Gabriel Schürrer (2015)
- (Argentina) Mario Sciacqua (2016)
- (Argentina) Fernando Gamboa (2016–2017)
- (Argentina) Martín Astudillo (2017–2018)
- (Argentina) Marcelo Herrera (2018–2019)
- (Argentina) Arnaldo Sialle (2020–2021)
- (Argentina) Cristian Molins (2022)

== See also ==
- 2019–20 Gimnasia y Esgrima de Jujuy season
