= 2013–14 Club Atlético Independiente season =

Independiente
2013–14 season
- President: Javier Cantero
- Manager: (Argentina) Miguel Ángel Brindisi (until 25 August) (Argentina) Omar De Felippe (from 29 August)
- Stadium: Estadio Libertadores de América
- Primera B Nacional: 3rd
- Copa Argentina: Fase Final III
- Top goalscorer: League: Daniel Montenegro (10); All: Daniel Montenegro (10)
Home colours	Away colours	Third colours

Club Atlético Independiente's 2013–14 season is the first season in the Primera B Nacional, following relegation from the Primera División in 2013. Independiente this season going to play in the Primera B Nacional and the Copa Argentina.

== Squad ==
=== Current squad ===
Last updated on 9 April 2014

Squad No.	Name	Nationality	Position	Date of birth (age)	Signed from
Goalkeepers
	Fabián Assmann	(Argentina)	GK	March 23, 1986 (age 40)	(Spain) Las Palmas
	Hilario Navarro	(Argentina)	GK	November 14, 1980 (age 45)	(Argentina) San Lorenzo
	Diego Rodríguez	(Argentina)	GK	June 25, 1989 (age 37)	(Argentina) The Academy
	Facundo Daffonchio	(Argentina)	GK	February 2, 1990 (age 36)	(Argentina) The Academy
Defenders
	Cristian Tula	(Argentina)	DF	March 28, 1978 (age 48)	(Colombia) Atlético Nacional
	Claudio Morel Rodríguez	(Paraguay)	DF	February 2, 1978 (age 48)	(Spain) Deportivo de La Coruña
	Julián Velázquez	(Argentina)	DF	October 23, 1990 (age 35)	(Argentina) The Academy
	Gabriel Vallés	(Argentina)	DF	May 31, 1986 (age 40)	(Argentina) Godoy Cruz
	Samuel Cáceres	(Paraguay)	DF	March 20, 1989 (age 37)	(Argentina) Nueva Chicago
	Sergio Ojeda	(Argentina)	DF	January 4, 1992 (age 34)	(Argentina) The Academy
	Alexis Zárate	(Argentina)	DF	April 8, 1994 (age 32)	(Argentina) The Academy
	Lucas Villalba	(Argentina)	DF	5 December 1987 (age 38)	(Argentina) The Academy
	Jorge Figal	(Argentina)	DF	3 April 1994 (age 32)	(Argentina) The Academy
	Alejandro Gómez	(Argentina)	DF	June 16, 1994 (age 32)	(Argentina) The Academy
	Néstor Breitenbruch	(Argentina)	DF	September 13, 1995 (age 31)	(Argentina) The Academy
Midfielders
	Reinaldo Alderete	(Argentina)	MF	February 6, 1985 (age 41)	(Argentina) San Martín (SJ)
	Federico Mancuello	(Argentina)	MF	March 26, 1989 (age 37)	(Argentina) Belgrano
	Hernán Fredes	(Argentina)	MF	27 March 1988 (age 38)	(Ukraine) Metalist Kharkiv
	Federico Insúa	(Argentina)	MF	January 3, 1980 (age 46)	(Argentina) Vélez Sarsfield
	Daniel Montenegro (C)	(Argentina)	MF	March 28, 1979 (age 47)	(Mexico) América
	Franco Bellocq	(Argentina)	MF	October 15, 1993 (age 33)	(Argentina) The Academy
	Martín Zapata	(Argentina)	MF	December 18, 1979 (age 46)	(Argentina) Belgrano
	Matías Pisano	(Argentina)	MF	1991 (age 34–35)	(Argentina) Chacarita
	Juan Manuel Trejo	(Argentina)	MF	August 19, 1994 (age 32)	(Argentina) The Academy
	Fabián Monserrat	(Argentina)	MF	June 25, 1992 (age 34)	(Argentina) The Academy
	Marcelo Vidal	(Argentina)	MF	January 15, 1991 (age 35)	(Argentina) The Academy
	Leonel Miranda	(Argentina)	MF	January 7, 1994 (age 32)	(Argentina) The Academy
	Guillermo Pereira	(Argentina)	MF	January 16, 1994 (age 32)	(Argentina) The Academy
Forwards
	Martín Benítez	(Argentina)	FW	June 17, 1994 (age 32)	(Argentina) The Academy
	Cristian Menéndez	(Argentina)	FW	April 2, 1988 (age 38)	(Argentina) Lanús
	Sebastián Penco	(Argentina)	FW	September 22, 1983 (age 43)	(Argentina) San Martín (SJ)
	Facundo Parra	(Argentina)	FW	15 June 1985 (age 41)	(Italy) Atalanta
	Francisco Pizzini	(Argentina)	FW	September 19, 1993 (age 33)	(Argentina) The Academy
	Adrián Fernandez	(Paraguay)	FW	August 4, 1992 (age 34)	(Paraguay) Cerro Porteño

=== Players out on loan ===
Note: Flags indicate national team as defined under FIFA eligibility rules; some limited exceptions apply. Players may hold more than one non-FIFA nationality.

No.	Pos.	Nation	Player
—	DF	ARG	Cristian Báez (at (Argentina) Defensa y Justicia)
—	MF	ARG	Walter Busse (at (Argentina) Defensa y Justicia)
—	DF	ARG	Federico Gay (at (Argentina) Aldosivi until 30 June 2015)
—	MF	ARG	Iván Pérez (at (Argentina) San Martín (San Juan))
—	FW	ARG	Patricio Vidal ( (Chile) Unión Española)

No.	Pos.	Nation	Player
—	MF	ARG	Lucas Villafáñez ( (Argentina) Huracán)
—	FW	COL	Juan Fernando Caicedo ( (Colombia) Santa Fe)
—	DF	ARG	Maximiliano Herrera (at (Argentina) Chacarita)
—	FW	ARG	Eloy Rodríguez ( (Argentina) Boca Unidos)

== Transfers ==
=== Winter transfers ===
Players In
Name	Nat	Pos	Moving from
Reinaldo Alderete	ARG	MF	(Argentina) San Martín (SJ)
Franco Razzotti	ARG	MF	(Argentina) Vélez Sarsfield
Cristian Menéndez	ARG	FW	(Argentina) Lanús
Sebastián Penco	ARG	FW	(Argentina) San Martín (SJ)
Christian Núñez	URU	FW	(Uruguay) Nacional
Facundo Parra	ARG	FW	(Italy) Atalanta
Matías Pisano	ARG	FW	(Argentina) Chacarita Juniors
Martín Zapata	ARG	MF	(Argentina) Club Atlético Belgrano
Carlos Henneberg	ARG	FW	(Argentina) Atlanta

Players Out
Name	Nat	Pos	Moving to
Adrián Gabbarini	ARG	DF	(Argentina) Newell's Old Boys
Cristian Báez	PAR	DF	(Argentina) Defensa y Justicia
Leonel Galeano	ARG	FW	(Spain) Rayo Vallecano
Federico Gay	ARG	MF	(Argentina) Aldosivi
Eduardo Tuzzio	ARG	FW	(Argentina) Ferro Carril Oeste
Roberto Battión	ARG	DF	(Argentina) All Boys
Nicolás Cabrera	ARG	DF	(Argentina) All Boys
Osmar Ferreyra	ARG	FW	(Argentina) River Plate
Fernando Godoy	ARG	FW	(Greece) Panetolikos
Iván Pérez	ARG	FW	(Argentina) San Martín (SJ)
Jonathan Santana	PAR	MF	(Argentina) Panetolikos
Fabián Vargas	COL	MF	(Ecuador) Barcelona
Lucas Villafáñez	ARG	MF	(Argentina) Huracán
Víctor Zapata	ARG	MF	(Argentina) Unión de Santa Fe
Juan Fernando Caicedo	COL	DF	(Colombia) Independiente Santa Fe
Ernesto Farías	ARG	MF	(Brazil) Cruzeiro
Luciano Leguizamón	ARG	MF	(Argentina) Colón
Roberto Russo	ARG	MF	(Argentina) Villa San Carlos
Eloy Rodríguez	ARG	MF	(Argentina) Boca Unidos
Gonzalo Contrera	ARG	MF	(Argentina) San Martín (SJ)

=== Summer transfers ===
Players In
Name	Nat	Pos	Moving from
Federico Insúa	(Argentina)	MF	(Argentina) Vélez Sarsfield

Players Out
Name	Nat	Pos	Moving to
Franco Razzotti	(Argentina)	MF	(Romania) Vaslui
Christian Núñez	(Uruguay)	MF	(Ecuador) Independiente del Valle

=== Current coaching staff ===
Position	Staff
Manager	(Argentina) Omar De Felippe
Assistant manager	(Argentina) Walter De Felippe
2nd Assistant manager	(Argentina) Ariel Wiktor
Fitness coach	(Argentina) Fernando Gómez
2nd Fitness coach	(Argentina) Fabián Arangio
Goalkeeping coach	(Argentina) Alfrado Rodríguez

Source: clubaindependiente.com

== Friendlies ==
Win Draw Loss Postponed

20 July 2013 Friendly	Independiente	3 – 0	Club Sportivo Dock Sud	Avellaneda, Argentina
10:30	Martín Zapata; Lucas Villalba	Report		Stadium: Predio de Villa Domínico

23 July 2013 Friendly	Independiente	1 – 0	Godoy Cruz	Buenos Aires, Argentina
11:30	Menéndez	Report		Stadium: Predio de Bosques

25 July 2013 Friendly	Independiente	2 – 2	Tigre	Avellaneda, Argentina
11:00	Juan Manuel Trejo; Francisco Pizzini	Report	García	Stadium: Predio de Villa Domínico

27 July 2013 Friendly	Vélez Sarsfield	0 – 0	Independiente	Buenos Aires, Argentina
10:00		Report		Stadium: Estadio José Amalfitani

13 January 2014 Friendly	Independiente	0 – 3	Racing Club	Mar del Plata, Argentina
22:10	Morel Rodríguez (red card) 6'; Diego Rodríguez (yellow card) 34'; Velázquez (yellow card) 38'; Alderete (yellow card) 65'	Report	Hauche 1'; Saveljich (yellow card) 20'; Saja 35' (pen.); Viola 39'	Stadium: José María Minella; Referee: Pablo Lunati

16 January 2014 Friendly	Independiente	0 – 0	Newell's Old Boys	Mar del Plata, Argentina
22:10	Cáceres (yellow card) 25'	Report	Orzán (yellow card) 39'	Stadium: José María Minella; Referee: Darío Herrera

20 January 2014 Friendly	Independiente	0 – 1	Rosario Central	Córdoba, Argentina
22:10		Report	Encina 16'; Magallán (yellow card) 44'; Nery Domínguez (yellow card) 57'; Méndez (yellow card) 66'	Stadium: Mario Alberto Kempes; Referee: Fernando Echenique

23 January 2014 Friendly	Independiente	0 – 2	Belgrano	Córdoba, Argentina
22:10		Report	Márquez 20'; Lollo 31'	Stadium: Mario Alberto Kempes; Referee: Ariel González

== Competitions ==
=== Primera B Nacional ===
Win Draw Loss Postponed

4 August 2013 Round 1	Independiente	1 – 2	Brown (A)	Avellaneda, Argentina
16:10 UTC−03:00	Juan Manuel Trejo (yellow card) 23'; Montenegro 29' (pen.) (yellow card) 30'; Martín Zapata (red card) 45'	Report	Martin Fabro 41'; Facundo Lemmo (yellow card) 28'; Gustavo Ruíz Díaz (red card) 45'; Matías Sproat 62'; Matías Giordano (yellow card) 77'; Pablo Miranda (yellow card) 84'	Stadium: Libertadores de América; Referee: Carlos Maglio

14 August 2013 Round 2	Boca Unidos	0 – 0	Independiente	Corrientes, Argentina
21:30 UTC−03:00	Diego Sánchez Paredes (yellow card) 37'; Oviedo (yellow card) 39'; Ríos (yellow card) 80'	Report	Alderete (yellow card) 22'; Alderete (red card) 22'; Razzotti (yellow card) 69'; Mancuello (yellow card) 74'	Stadium: José Antonio Romero Feris; Referee: Pablo Díaz

17 August 2013 Round 3	Independiente	2 – 2	Aldosivi	Avellaneda, Argentina
16:00 UTC−03:00	Mancuello 7'; Montenegro 17' (pen.); Lucas Villalba (yellow card) 40'; Núñez (yellow card) 75'	Report	Cajaravilla (yellow card) 14'; Carlos Rearte (yellow card) 17'; Leandro Aguirre (yellow card) 34'; Seccafien (yellow card) 52'; Martínez 53'; Luis Vildozo 67', (yellow card) 83'; Víctor Malcorra (yellow card) 81'; Cajaravilla (red card) 90'	Stadium: Libertadores de América; Referee: Mauro Giannini

24 August 2013 Round 4	Atlético Tucumán	2 – 1	Independiente	San Miguel de Tucumán, Argentina
20:00 UTC−03:00	Edgardo Galíndez 11'; Mozzo (yellow card) 44'; Morel (yellow card) 45'	Report	Lucas Villalba (yellow card) 36'; Mancuello (yellow card) 51'; Matías Pisano 90'	Stadium: Monumental José Fierro; Referee: Mauro Vigliano

1 September 2013 Round 5	Independiente	0 – 0	Independiente Rivadavia	Avellaneda, Argentina
18:10 UTC−03:00	Adrián Fernandez (yellow card) 45'; Morel Rodríguez (yellow card) 78'	Report	Tonetto (yellow card) 11'; Leandro Caballero (yellow card) 79'	Stadium: Libertadores de América; Referee: Juan Pablo Pompei

9 September 2013 Round 6	Huracán	0 – 1	Independiente	Buenos Aires, Argentina
19:15 UTC−03:00	Arano (red card) 9'; Guillermo Sotelo (yellow card) 28'; Víctor Cuesta (yellow card) 51'; Ferrero (yellow card) 56'; Lucas Villarrue (yellow card) 69'	Report	Vallés (yellow card) 15'; Cáceres (yellow card) 44', (goal) 86'; Alderete (yellow card) 50'; Benítez (yellow card) 60'	Stadium: Tomás Adolfo Ducó; Referee: Sergio Pezzotta

14 September 2013 Round 7	Independiente	1 – 1	Banfield	Avellaneda, Argentina
16:00 UTC−03:00	Alderete (yellow card) 30'; Alderete (red card) 49'; Cáceres 72'	Report	Noir (yellow card) 27'; Segovia (yellow card) 41'; Andrés Chávez 45'; Nahuel Yeri (yellow card) 53'; Fabián Noguera (yellow card) 83'; Santiago Salcedo (red card) 90'	Stadium: Libertadores de América; Referee: Saúl Laverni

18 September 2013 Round 8	Villa San Carlos	0 – 1	Independiente	Buenos Aires, Argentina
18:10 UTC−03:00	Mauro Raverta (yellow card) 28'; Martín Troncoso (yellow card) 40'; Emiliano Méndez (yellow card) 42'	Report	Montenegro 26'; Parra (yellow card) 42'; Lucas Villalba (yellow card) 51'; Fabián Monserrat (yellow card) 78'	Stadium: El Bosque; Referee: Juan Pablo Pompei

23 September 2013 Round 9	Independiente	2 – 1	Sarmiento (J)	Avellaneda, Argentina
18:10 UTC−03:00	Parra 39', 54'	Report	Luis Garnier 4', (yellow card) 90'; Sena (yellow card) 55'; Ramiro López (yellow card) 90'; Iuvalé (yellow card) 90'	Stadium: Libertadores de América; Referee: Alejandro Castro

28 September 2013 Round 10	Talleres (C)	2 – 2	Independiente	Córdoba, Argentina
20:15 UTC−03:00	Fredrich 4'; Bazzi (yellow card) 38'; Vega (yellow card) 57'; Brítez Ojeda (yellow card) 60'; Sánchez Sotelo 75'; Vera (yellow card) 86'	Report	Vallés (yellow card) 17'; Núñez (yellow card) 41'; Montenegro 44', 49'; Martín Zapata (yellow card) 82'; Morel Rodríguez (yellow card) 87'	Stadium: Mario Alberto Kempes; Referee: Sergio Pezzotta

4 October 2013 Round 11	Independiente	v	Unión	Avellaneda, Argentina
20:10 UTC−03:00				Stadium: Libertadores de América

12 October 2013 Round 12	Almirante Brown	1 – 0	Independiente	Isidro Casanova, Argentina
16:00 UTC−03:00	Garré (yellow card) 9'; Carballo 14'; Gastón Giménez (yellow card) 25'; Hernán Ortíz (yellow card) 61'	Report	Razzotti (yellow card) 50'; Morel Rodríguez (yellow card) 52'	Stadium: Fragata Presidente Sarmiento; Referee: Silvio Trucco

19 October 2013 Round 13	Independiente	2 – 1	Crucero del Norte	Avellaneda, Argentina
18:00 UTC−03:00	Matías Pisano 13'; Menéndez 51'	Report	Federico Rosso (yellow card) 4', (red card) 87'; Carlos Marczuk (yellow card) 14'; Claudio Fileppi (yellow card) 32'; Bruno 33', (red card) 84'; Diego Torres (yellow card) 84'	Stadium: Libertadores de América; Referee: Jorge Baliño

24 October 2013 Round 11	Independiente	1 – 1	Unión	Avellaneda, Argentina
16:00 UTC−03:00	Martín Zapata (yellow card) 17'; Montenegro 29'; Juan Manuel Trejo (yellow card) 43'; Razzotti (yellow card) 50'; Leonel Miranda (yellow card) 75'	Report	Zapata (yellow card) 20'; Islas (yellow card) 26'; Correa (yellow card) 28'; Vella (yellow card) 32'; Alemán 54'; Pablo Bruna (yellow card) 78'	Stadium: Libertadores de América; Referee: Diego Ceballos

29 October 2013 Round 14	Sportivo Belgrano	0 – 1	Independiente	San Francisco, Argentina
20:10 UTC−03:00	Quiroga (yellow card) 35'; Verino (yellow card) 81'	Report	Velázquez (yellow card) 75'; Parra 86'	Stadium: Oscar Boero; Referee: Juan Pablo Pompei

4 November 2013 Round 15	Independiente	1 – 0	Gimnasia y Esgrima (J)	Avellaneda, Argentina
20:10 UTC−03:00	Marcelo Vidal 40'; Parra (yellow card) 38'; Leonel Miranda (yellow card) 86'	Report	Damián Canuto (yellow card) 34'; Alvaro Brun (yellow card) 40'	Stadium: Libertadores de América; Referee: Mauro Vigliano
Note: Independiente head coach Omar De Felippe was dismissed in the 61st minute.

9 November 2013 Round 16	San Martín (SJ)	0 – 0	Independiente	San Juan, Argentina
18:10 UTC−03:00	Bogado (yellow card) 61'; Francisco Mattia (yellow card) 65'; Bustos (yellow card) 67'	Report	Leonel Miranda (yellow card) 24'; Cáceres (yellow card) 82'; Lucas Villalba (yellow card) 83'	Stadium: Ingeniero Hilario Sánchez; Referee: Fernando Rapallini

13 November 2013 Round 17	Independiente	3 – 0	Ferro Carril Oeste	Avellaneda, Argentina
20:00 UTC−03:00	Montenegro 12', 72'; Mancuello (yellow card) 58'; Vallés 80'	Report	Correa (yellow card) 7', (red card) 34'	Stadium: Libertadores de América; Referee: Ariel Suárez

18 November 2013 Round 18	Independiente	2 – 0	Douglas Haig	Avellaneda, Argentina
19:10 UTC−03:00	Parra 22'; Cáceres 88'	Report		Stadium: Libertadores de América; Referee: Pablo Lunati

23 November 2013 Round 19	Defensa y Justicia	0 – 0	Independiente	Florencio Varela, Argentina
17:00 UTC−03:00	Nélson Acevedo (yellow card) 12'; Adrián Iglesias (yellow card) 43'; Adrián Iglesias (red card) 76'	Report	Velázquez (yellow card) 6'; Matias Pisano (yellow card) 43'; Cáceres (yellow card) 86'	Stadium: Norberto "Tito" Tomaghello; Referee: Alejandro Castro

2 December 2013 Round 20	Independiente	2 – 0	Instituto	Avellaneda, Argentina
18:10 UTC−03:00	Morel Rodríguez (yellow card) 52'; Martín Zapata 51'; Parra 65'; Mancuello (yellow card) 78'	Report	De la Fuente (yellow card) 57'; Frontini (yellow card) 90'	Stadium: Libertadores de América; Referee: Ariel Suárez

7 December 2013 Round 21	Patronato	0 – 1	Independiente	Paraná, Argentina
20:20 UTC−03:00	Lautaro Germiniani (yellow card) 20'; Walter Andrade (yellow card) 40'	Report	Marcelo Vidal (yellow card) 22', (goal) 87'; Matias Pisano (yellow card) 49'	Stadium: Presbítero Bartolomé Grella; Referee: Patricio Loustau

9 February 2014 Round 22	Brown (A)	1 – 2	Independiente	Temperley, Argentina
17:00 UTC−03:00	Mariano Guerreiro 63'; Víctor Soto (yellow card) 90'	Report	Parra 8'; Matías Pisano 15'; Vallés (yellow card) 20'; Tula (yellow card) 59', (red card) 70'	Stadium: Alfredo Beranger; Referee: Pablo Díaz

14 February 2014 Round 23	Independiente	1 – 1	Boca Unidos	Avellaneda, Argentina
21:30 UTC−03:00	Alderete (yellow card) 23'; Velázquez (yellow card) 37'; Vallés (yellow card) 44'; Adrián Fernandez 85'	Report	Raymonda 24', (yellow card) 73'; Oviedo (yellow card) 29'; Escobar (yellow card) 45'; Leonardo Baroni (yellow card) 88'	Stadium: Libertadores de América; Referee: Fernando Echenique

21 February 2014 Round 24	Aldosivi	0 – 0	Independiente	Mar del Plata, Argentina
21:30 UTC−03:00	Pablo Campodónico (yellow card) 0'; Matías Soto Torres (yellow card) 76'; Seccafien (yellow card) 80'	Report	Alderete (yellow card) 53'; Parra (yellow card) 89'	Stadium: José María Minella; Referee: Germán Delfino
Note: Facundo Parra was Booked while an unused substitute

26 February 2014 Round 25	Independiente	1 – 3	Atlético Tucumán	Avellaneda, Argentina
20:15 UTC−03:00	Penco 70'; Franco Bellocq (yellow card) 84'	Report	Bazán 34'; Rodríguez 46'; Piríz Alves 89'	Stadium: Libertadores de América; Referee: Pablo Díaz

3 March 2014 Round 26	Independiente Rivadavia	2 – 1	Independiente	Mendoza, Argentina
20:15 UTC−03:00	Leandro Caballero (red card) 6'; Lucas Gamba 14'; Ezequiel Pérez 30'; Tonetto (yellow card) 53'; Abel Peralta (yellow card) 68'	Report	Vallés (yellow card) 12'; Tula (yellow card) 79'; Mancuello 84'	Stadium: Bautista Gargantini; Referee: Saúl Laverni

8 March 2014 Round 27	Independiente	0 – 1	Huracán	Avellaneda, Argentina
20:15 UTC−03:00	Cáceres (yellow card) 29'; Lucas Villalba (yellow card) 40'; Montenegro (yellow card) 70'; Marcelo Vidal (yellow card) 73'	Report	Víctor Cuesta (yellow card) 24'; Toranzo 57'; Lucas Villaruel (yellow card) 68'	Stadium: Libertadores de América; Referee: Sergio Pezzotta

15 March 2014 Round 28	Banfield	3 – 3	Independiente	Banfield, Argentina
22:00 UTC−03:00	Erviti (yellow card) 35'; Bianchi Arce (yellow card) 36'; Noir 57'; Salcedo 63', (yellow card) 79', (goal) 93'; Prichoda (yellow card) 75'	Report	Mancuello (yellow card) 20'; Fredes 26', (yellow card) 28', (red card) 74'; Lucas Villalba (yellow card) 30'; Penco 32'; Vallés (yellow card) 58'; Diego Rodríguez 74' (pen.); Tula (yellow card) 81'	Stadium: Florencio Solá; Referee: Germán Delfino

19 March 2014 Round 29	Independiente	0 – 0	Villa San Carlos	Avellaneda, Argentina
19:30 UTC−03:00	Mancuello (yellow card) 17'	Report	Emiliano Córdoba (yellow card) 30'; Emanuel Sarati (yellow card) 32'; Mauro Raverta (yellow card) 75'; Francisco Di Fulvio (yellow card) 91'; Morales (yellow card) 93'	Stadium: Libertadores de América; Referee: Patricio Loustau

24 March 2014 Round 30	Sarmiento (J)	2 – 0	Independiente	Junín, Argentina
21:30 UTC−03:00	Ramiro López 23'; Nahuel Quiroga (yellow card) 50'; Damián Canuto (yellow card) 60'; Ignacio Cacheiro 85'	Report	Vallés (yellow card) 26'; Marcelo Vidal (yellow card) 30'; Tula (red card) 62'	Stadium: Eva Perón; Referee: Pablo Lunati

30 March 2014 Round 31	Independiente	3 – 0	Talleres (C)	Avellaneda, Argentina
17:00 UTC−03:00	Parra 19', 39', 69'; Mancuello (yellow card) 62'	Report	Jesús Nievas (yellow card) 24'	Stadium: Libertadores de América; Referee: Alejandro Castro

5 April 2014 Round 32	Unión	0 – 0	Independiente	Santa Fe, Argentina
17:10 UTC−03:00		Report		Stadium: 15 de Abril; Referee: Saúl Laverni

14 April 2014 Round 33	Independiente	1 – 1	Almirante Brown	Avellaneda, Argentina
20:10 UTC−03:00	Fredes 41'; Penco (yellow card) 63'; Diego Rodríguez (yellow card) 91'	Report	Basualdo (yellow card) 8'; Mauro Marrone (red card) 88'; Tobias Figueroa 26'	Stadium: Libertadores de América; Referee: Diego Ceballos

19 April 2014 Round 34	Crucero del Norte	3 – 1	Independiente	Garupá, Argentina
20:30 UTC−03:00	Calgaro 2'; Ernesto Alvarez 35', 78'; Juan Mendonça (yellow card) 45'; Facundo Torres (yellow card) 88'	Report	Fredes (yellow card) 4'; Montenegro 23'; Cáceres (yellow card) 49'; Lucas Villalba (yellow card) 62'	Stadium: Comandante Andrés Guacurarí; Referee: Fernando Rapallini

28 April 2014 Round 35	Independiente	3 – 2	Sportivo Belgrano	Avellaneda, Argentina
20:30 UTC−03:00	Tula 32'; Marcelo Vidal 45', (yellow card) 88'; Morel Rodríguez 51'; Diego Rodríguez 80' (pen.)	Report	Juan Pablo Francia (yellow card) 25'; Medina 39', (yellow card) 78'; Federico Martorell 55'; Dolci (yellow card) 80'	Stadium: Libertadores de América; Referee: Carlos Maglio

4 May 2014 Round 36	Gimnasia y Esgrima (J)	1 – 0	Independiente	San Salvador de Jujuy, Argentina
17:00 UTC−03:00	Quiroga 72'; Berza (yellow card) 84'; Martirena (yellow card) 86'	Report	Adrián Fernandez (yellow card) 36'	Stadium: 23 de Agosto

9 May 2014 Round 37	Independiente	2 – 0	San Martín (SJ)	Avellaneda, Argentina
20:10 UTC−03:00	Sergio Ojeda 6'; Marcelo Vidal (yellow card) 27'; Insúa 56'; Montenegro (yellow card) 72'	Report	Kruspzky (yellow card) 10'; Bogado (yellow card) 64'; Nicolás Pelaitay (yellow card) 88'	Stadium: Libertadores de América; Referee: Juan Pablo Pompei

14 May 2014 Round 38	Ferro Carril Oeste	1 – 1	Independiente	Buenos Aires, Argentina
19:10 UTC−03:00	Caballero 14'; Tuzzio (penalty missed); Vegetti (red card) 59'; Christian Chimino (yellow card) 89'	Report	Fredes (yellow card) 32'; Diego Rodríguez (yellow card) 57'; Montenegro (yellow card) 66'; Francisco Pizzini (yellow card) 75'; Mancuello (red card) 79'; Penco 91'	Stadium: Arquitecto Ricardo Etcheverry; Referee: Germán Delfino

19 May 2014 Round 39	Douglas Haig	1 – 2	Independiente	Pergamino, Argentina
18:00 UTC−03:00	Cristian Stele (yellow card) 44'; Iván Etevenaux 55' (pen.)	Report	Vallés (yellow card) 22'; Martín Zapata (yellow card) 54'; Insúa 64'; Penco 68'	Stadium: Miguel Morales; Referee: Luis Álvarez

24 May 2014 Round 40	Independiente	2 – 1	Defensa y Justicia	Avellaneda, Argentina
17:10 UTC−03:00	Vallés (yellow card) 6'; Matías Pisano 26'; Sergio Ojeda (yellow card) 62', (goal) 71'; Franco Bellocq (yellow card) 75'; Morel Rodríguez (red card) 90'	Report	Guerra 7', (red card) 29'; Marcelo Benítez (yellow card) 10'; Emir Faccioli (red card) 90'; Báez (red card) 90'	Stadium: Libertadores de América; Referee: Silvio Trucco

1 January 2014 Round 41	Instituto	1 – 2	Independiente	Córdoba, Argentina
17:00 UTC−03:00	Damiani 30'; Tellechea (yellow card) 38'; Velázquez (red card) 80'	Report	Montenegro 61'; Penco 88', (yellow card) 90'	Stadium: Presidente Perón; Referee: Patricio Loustau

8 June 2014 Round 42	Independiente	0 – 0	Patronato	Avellaneda, Argentina
15:00 UTC−03:00		Report		Stadium: Libertadores de América; Attendance: 50.000; Referee: Mauro Vigliano

=== Tie-Break Playoff match ===
11 June 2014 3rd Promotion match	Independiente	2 – 0	Huracán	La Plata, Argentina
14:30 UTC−03:00	Zapata 37'; Pizzini 86'	Report		Stadium: Estadio Único de La Plata; Referee: Diego Ceballos

== Season review ==
=== League table ===
Pos	Team	Pld	W	D	L	GF	GA	GD	Pts	Promotion or qualification
2	Defensa y Justicia	42	21	12	9	67	45	+22	75	Primera División
3	Huracán	42	19	10	13	43	30	+13	67	Tiebreaker Playoff
4	Independiente (P)	42	17	16	9	49	37	+12	67	Tiebreaker Playoff
5	Atlético Tucumán	42	16	16	10	44	36	+8	64	
6	Instituto	42	16	14	12	54	46	+8	62	

Updated to match(es) played on June 8, 2014. Source: AFA
Rules for classification: 1st points; 2nd goal difference; 3rd goals scored; 4th head-to-head points; 5th head-to-head goal difference; 6th head-to-head goals scored. This does not apply to determining the champion. If two or more teams had been tied in point at the end of the tournament, a playoff would have been held at a neutral venue within 72 hours for the championship
(P) Promoted

=== Results summary ===
Overall								Home						Away					
Pld	W	D	L	GF	GA	GD	Pts	W	D	L	GF	GA	GD	W	D	L	GF	GA	GD
43	18	16	9	51	37	+14	70	11	8	3	32	17	+15	7	8	6	19	20	−1

Last updated: 10 March 2014.
Source: Soccerway

Game 43, against Huracán, was neutral, but Independiente was "home" by a draw.

=== Results by round ===
Round	1	2	3	4	5	6	7	8	9	10	11	12	13	14	15	16	17	18	19	20	21	22	23	24	25	26	27	28	29	30	31	32	33	34	35	36	37	38	39	40	41	42
Ground	H	A	H	A	H	A	H	A	H	A	H	A	H	A	H	A	H	H	A	H	A	A	H	A	H	A	H	A	H	A	H	A	H	A	H	A	H	A	A	H	A	H
Result	L	D	D	L	D	W	D	W	W	D	D	L	W	W	W	D	W	W	D	W	W	W	D	D	L	L	L	D	D	L	W	D	D	L	W	L	W	D	W	W	W	D
Position	16	16	17	19	19	18	17	11	8	9	9	12	9	7	5	6	5	4	4	4	3	3	3	3	3	3	3	3	3	3	3	4	4	5	4	5	4	4	4	3	3	3

Source: Soccerway
A = Away; H = Home; W = Win; D = Draw; L = Loss

=== Copa Argentina ===
9 April 2014 Fase Final II	Independiente	4 – 2	Deportivo Santamarina	San Luis, Argentina
20:00 UTC−03:00	Insúa 26' (pen.), 63'; Fabián Monserrat 35', (yellow card) 40'; Menéndez 65' (pen.); Néstor Breitenbruch (yellow card) 80'; Guillermo Pereira (yellow card) 87'	Report	Ignacio Celaya (yellow card) 25', (goal) 41'; Jorge Peirone (yellow card) 31'; Leonardo Gogna (yellow card) 69'; Maximiliano Timpanaro 71'	Stadium: Estadio Provincial Juan Gilberto Funes; Referee: Carlos Maglio

Fase Final III	Independiente	v	Belgrano	, Argentina
--:-- UTC−03:00

== Squad statistics ==
Updated on 9 May 2014

			Primera B Nacional					Copa Argentina					Total				
Nation	No.	Name		GS	Min.	Goal	Assist		GS	Min.	Goal	Assist		GS	Min.	Goal	Assist
Goalkeepers
(Argentina)		Fabián Assmann	3	2	270	0	0	1	1	90	0	0	4	4	360	0	0
(Argentina)		Hilario Navarro	0	0	0	0	0	0	0	0	0	0	0	0	0	0	0
(Argentina)		Diego Rodríguez	33	33	2,970	2	0	0	0	0	0	0	33	33	2,970	2	0
(Argentina)		Facundo Daffonchio	0	0	0	0	0	0	0	0	0	0	0	0	0	0	0
Defenders
(Argentina)		Cristian Tula	21	21	1,852	1	1	0	0	0	0	0	21	21	1,852	1	1
(Paraguay)		Claudio Morel Rodríguez	17	17	1,530	0	0	1	1	90	0	0	18	18	1,620	0	0
(Argentina)		Julián Velázquez	19	19	1,570	0	1	0	0	0	0	0	19	19	1,570	0	1
(Argentina)		Gabriel Vallés	33	32	2,855	1	1	0	0	0	0	0	33	32	2,855	1	1
(Paraguay)		Samuel Cáceres	17	14	1,391	3	1	1	1	90	0	0	18	15	1,481	3	1
(Argentina)		Sergio Ojeda	7	6	544	0	0	0	0	0	0	0	7	6	544	0	0
(Argentina)		Alexis Zárate	1	1	90	0	0	0	0	0	0	0	1	1	90	0	0
(Argentina)		Lucas Villalba	22	21	1,799	0	1	0	0	0	0	0	22	21	1,799	0	1
(Argentina)		Jorge Figal	1	0	16	0	0	1	1	90	0	0	2	1	106	0	0
(Argentina)		Alejandro Gomez	0	0	0	0	0	0	0	0	0	0	0	0	0	0	0
(Argentina)		Néstor Breitenbruch	0	0	0	0	0	1	1	90	0	0	1	1	90	0	0
Midfielders
(Argentina)		Reinaldo Alderete	11	8	762	0	0	1	1	90	0	0	12	9	852	0	0
(Argentina)		Federico Mancuello	32	31	2,625	2	1	0	0	0	0	0	32	31	2,625	2	1
(Argentina)		Hernán Fredes	11	10	760	2	0	0	0	0	0	0	11	10	760	2	0
(Argentina)		Federico Insúa	10	5	448	0	1	1	1	84	2	1	11	6	532	2	2
(Argentina)		Francisco Pizzini	14	1	237	0	1	1	0	6	0	0	15	1	243	0	1
(Argentina)		Franco Bellocq	5	3	285	0	0	0	0	0	0	0	5	3	285	0	0
(Argentina)		Martín Zapata	31	30	2,531	1	0	0	0	0	0	0	31	30	2,531	1	0
(Argentina)		Matías Pisano	34	24	2,193	3	6	1	1	78	0	1	35	25	2,271	3	7
(Argentina)		Juan Manuel Trejo	6	4	246	0	0	0	0	0	0	0	4	6	246	0	0
(Argentina)		Fabián Monserrat	2	2	135	0	0	1	1	90	1	0	3	3	225	1	0
(Argentina)		Marcelo Vidal	22	17	1,544	3	0	0	0	0	0	0	22	17	1,544	3	0
(Argentina)		Leonel Miranda	19	7	839	0	0	1	1	90	0	0	19	8	929	0	0
(Argentina)		Guillermo Perira	0	0	0	0	0	1	0	12	0	0	1	0	12	0	0
Forwards
(Argentina)		Daniel Montenegro	35	35	3,036	9	7	0	0	0	0	0	35	35	3,036	9	7
(Argentina)		Martín Benítez	10	0	199	0	0	0	0	0	0	0	10	0	199	0	0
(Argentina)		Cristian Menéndez	19	10	954	1	0	1	1	67	1	0	20	11	1,021	2	0
(Argentina)		Sebastián Penco	18	5	638	2	0	1	0	23	0	0	19	5	661	2	0
(Argentina)		Facundo Parra	25	22	1,786	9	0	0	0	0	0	0	25	22	1,786	9	0
(Paraguay)		Adrián Fernandez	9	4	469	1	1	0	0	0	0	0	9	4	469	1	1
Players who no longer play for Independiente
(Uruguay)		Christian Núñez	2	4	254	0	1	0	0	0	0	0	2	4	254	0	1
(Argentina)		Franco Razzotti	9	10	812	0	0	0	0	0	0	0	9	10	812	0	0

=== Goals ===
Rank	Player	Position	Primera B Nacional	Copa Argentina	Total
1	(Argentina) Daniel Montenegro	MF	10	0	10
2	(Argentina) Facundo Parra	FW	9	0	9
3	(Argentina) Sebastián Penco	FW	5	0	5
4	(Argentina) Federico Insúa	MF	2	2	4
4	(Argentina) Matias Pisano	MF	4	0	4
5	(Argentina) Samuel Cáceres	DF	3	0	3
5	(Argentina) Marcelo Vidal	MF	3	0	3
6	(Argentina) Federico Mancuello	MF	2	0	2
6	(Argentina) Cristian Menéndez	FW	1	1	2
6	(Argentina) Hernán Fredes	MF	2	0	2
6	(Argentina) Diego Rodríguez	GK	2	0	2
6	(Argentina) Sergio Ojeda	DF	2	0	2
6	(Argentina) Martín Zapata	MF	2	0	2
7	(Argentina) Fabián Monserrat	MF	0	1	1
7	(Argentina) Gabriel Vallés	DF	1	0	1
7	(Paraguay) Adrián Fernandez	FW	1	0	1
7	(Argentina) Cristian Tula	DF	1	0	1
7	(Argentina) Francisco Pizzini	FW	1	0	1
Total			51	4	55

==== Disciplinary record ====
Pos.	Name	Primera B Nacional		Copa Argentina		Total		Note
Pos.	Name	Yellow card	Red card	Yellow card	Red card	Yellow card	Red card	
MF	Federico Mancuello	8	1	0	0	8	1	
DF	Gabriel Vallés	8	0	0	0	8	0	
DF	Lucas Villalba	7	0	0	0	7	0	
DF	Cristian Tula	5	2	0	0	5	2	
MF	Marcelo Videl	6	0	0	0	6	0	
DF	Claudio Morel Rodríguez	5	1	0	0	5	1	
MF	Martín Zapata	5	1	0	0	5	1	
MF	Reinaldo Alderete	4	2	0	0	4	2	
MF	Hernán Fredes	4	1	0	0	4	1	
DF	Samuel Cáceres	5	0	0	0	5	0	
MF	Daniel Montenegro	5	0	0	0	5	0	
DF	Julián Velázquez	4	0	0	0	4	0	
FW	Sebastián Penco	4	0	0	0	4	0	
MF	Leonel Miranda	3	0	0	0	3	0	
MF	Matias Pisano	3	0	0	0	3	0	
FW	Facundo Parra	3	0	0	0	3	0	
GK	Diego Rodríguez	3	0	0	0	3	0	
MF	Franco Bellocq	3	0	0	0	3	0	
MF	Franco Razzotti	3	0	0	0	3	0	
MF	Juan Manuel Trejo	2	0	0	0	2	0	
FW	Adrián Fernandez	2	0	0	0	2	0	
MF	Fabián Monserrat	1	0	1	0	2	0	
FW	Francisco Pizzini	2	0	0	0	2	0	
DF	Christian Núñez	2	0	0	0	2	0	
DF	Néstor Breitenbruch	0	0	1	0	1	0	
MF	Guillermo Pereira	0	0	1	0	1	0	
DF	Sergio Ojeda	1	0	0	0	1	0	
FW	Martín Benítez	1	0	0	0	1	0	

==== Penalties ====
Date	Penalty Taker	Scored	Opponent	Competition
4 August 2013	Daniel Montenegro	Yes	Brown (A)	Primera B Nacional
17 August 2013	Daniel Montenegro	Yes	Aldosivi	Primera B Nacional
24 October 2013	Daniel Montenegro	Yes	Unión	Primera B Nacional
8 March 2014	Daniel Montenegro	No	Huracán	Primera B Nacional
15 March 2014	Diego Rodríguez	Yes	Banfield	Primera B Nacional
9 April 2014	Federico Insúa	Yes	Santamarina	Copa Argentina
9 April 2014	Cristian Menéndez	Yes	Santamarina	Copa Argentina
29 April 2014	Diego Rodríguez	Yes	Sportivo Belgrano	Primera B Nacional

=== Overall ===
	Total	Home	Away	Naturel
Games played	44	21	21	2
Games won	19	10	7	2
Games drawn	16	8	8	-
Games lost	9	3	6	-
Biggest win	3 – 0 vs Ferro Carril Oeste; 3-0 vs Talleres			
Biggest loss	1–3 vs Atlético Tucumán	1-3 vs Atlético Tucumán	0–2 vs Sarmiento; 1-3 vs Crucero del Norte	-
Biggest win (League)	3 – 0 vs Ferro Carril Oeste	3-0 vs Talleres	-	
Biggest win (Cup)	4-2 vs Santamarina	-	-	4-2 vs Santamarina
Biggest loss (League)	1–3 vs Atlético Tucumán	1-3 vs Atlético Tucumán	0–2 vs Sarmiento; 1-3 vs Crucero del Norte	-
Biggest loss (Cup)	-	-	-	-
Clean sheets	19	9	9	1
Goals scored	55	30	19	6
Goals conceded	39	17	20	2
Goal difference	+16	+13	-1	+4
Average GF per game	1.26	1.5	0.9	4
Average GA per game	0.95	0.9	0.95	2
Yellow cards	103	47	53	3
Red cards	8	3	5	-
Most appearances	(Argentina) Daniel Montenegro (42)	–		
Most minutes played	(Argentina) Daniel Montenegro (3,590)	–		
Most goals	(Argentina) Daniel Montenegro (10)	–		
Winning rate	43.18%	52.38%	36.36%	100%

Last updated: 11 June 2014
Source: Competitive matches
