= 2014 Club Atlético Independiente season =

Independiente
2014 season
- President: Hugo Moyano
- Manager: (Argentina) Jorge Almiron
- Stadium: Estadio Libertadores de América
- Argentine Primera División: 3rd
- Copa Argentina: Elimited In Round of 16
- Top goalscorer: League: Federico Mancuello (9); All: Federico Mancuello (9)
Home colours	Away colours	Third colours

The 2014 season is Independiente's first season back in the Primera División, following one season in the Primera B Nacional. Independiente this season going to play in the Argentine Primera División and be Continue Copa Argentina.

== Current squad ==
Last updated on 16 October 2014

Squad No.	Name	Nationality	Position	Date of birth (age)	Signed from	Note
Goalkeepers
1	Diego Rodríguez	(Argentina)	GK	June 25, 1989 (age 37)	(Argentina) Independiente	
12	Facundo Daffonchio	(Argentina)	GK	February 2, 1990 (age 36)	(Argentina) Independiente	
22	Germán Montoya	(Argentina)	GK	January 23, 1983 (age 43)	(Argentina) Colón	
30	Alan Depotte	(Argentina)	GK	May 18, 1993 (age 33)	(Argentina) Independiente	
Defenders
2	Cristian Tula (VC)	(Argentina)	DF	March 28, 1978 (age 48)	(Colombia) Atlético Nacional	
3	Lucas Villalba	(Argentina)	DF	December 5, 1987 (age 38)	(Argentina) Independiente	
4	Néstor Breitenbruch	(Argentina)	DF	September 13, 1995 (age 31)	(Argentina) Independiente	Injury
6	Sergio Ojeda	(Argentina)	DF	January 4, 1992 (age 34)	(Argentina) Independiente	
13	Rodrigo Moreira	(Argentina)	DF	June 15, 1993 (age 33)	(Argentina) Independiente	
15	Jorge Figal	(Argentina)	DF	April 3, 1994 (age 32)	(Argentina) Independiente	
25	Alexis Zárate	(Argentina)	DF	April 8, 1994 (age 32)	(Argentina) Independiente	
27	Víctor Cuesta	(Argentina)	DF	November 19, 1988 (age 37)	(Argentina) Arsenal	
28	Gabriel Vallés	(Argentina)	DF	May 31, 1986 (age 40)	(Argentina) Godoy Cruz	Injury
31	Rafael Barrios	(Argentina)	DF	May 23, 1993 (age 33)	(Argentina) Independiente	
34	Sergio Escudero	(Argentina)	DF	April 12, 1983 (age 43)	(Brazil) Criciúma	
	Emanuel Aguilera	(Argentina)	DF	June 11, 1989 (age 37)	(Argentina) Godoy Cruz	
Midfielders
5	Franco Bellocq	(Argentina)	MF	October 15, 1993 (age 32)	(Argentina) Independiente	
8	Jesús Méndez	(Argentina)	MF	August 1, 1984 (age 42)	(Argentina) Rosario Central	
10	Federico Insúa	(Argentina)	MF	January 3, 1980 (age 46)	(Argentina) Vélez Sarsfield	
11	Federico Mancuello (C)	(Argentina)	MF	March 26, 1989 (age 37)	(Argentina) Belgrano	
14	Fabián Monserrat	(Argentina)	MF	June 25, 1992 (age 34)	(Argentina) Independiente	
16	Jorge Iván Pérez	(Argentina)	MF	May 23, 1990 (age 36)	(Argentina) San Martín de San Juan	
20	Christian Ortiz	(Argentina)	MF	August 20, 1990 (age 36)	(Argentina) Independiente	
23	Daniel Montenegro (VC)	(Argentina)	MF	March 28, 1979 (age 47)	(Mexico) América	
24	Marcelo Vidal	(Argentina)	MF	January 15, 1991 (age 35)	(Argentina) Independiente	
26	Rodrigo Gómez	(Argentina)	MF	January 2, 1993 (age 33)	(Argentina) Argentinos Juniors	
32	Matías Pisano	(Argentina)	MF	1991 (age 34–35)	(Argentina) Chacarita	
33	Leonel Miranda	(Argentina)	MF	January 7, 1994 (age 32)	(Argentina) Independiente	
37	Juan Manuel Trejo	(Argentina)	MF	August 19, 1994 (age 32)	(Argentina) Independiente	Injury
Forwards
7	Francisco Pizzini	(Argentina)	FW	September 19, 1993 (age 33)	(Argentina) Independiente	
9	Sebastián Penco	(Argentina)	FW	September 22, 1983 (age 43)	(Argentina) San Martín (SJ)	
17	Patricio Vidal	(Argentina)	FW	April 8, 1992 (age 34)	(Chile) Unión Española	
19	Juan Martín Lucero	(Argentina)	FW	November 30, 1991 (age 34)	(Argentina) Defensa y Justicia	
21	Claudio Riaño	(Argentina)	FW	August 1, 1988 (age 38)	(Argentina) Boca Juniors	
29	Martín Benítez	(Argentina)	FW	June 17, 1994 (age 32)	(Argentina) Independiente	
35	Maximiliano Herrera	(Argentina)	FW	January 8, 1993 (age 33)	(Argentina) Chacarita Juniors	
36	Eloy Rodriguez	(Argentina)	FW	May 3, 1993 (age 33)	(Argentina) Boca Unidos	

== Players out on loan ==
Note: Flags indicate national team as defined under FIFA eligibility rules; some limited exceptions apply. Players may hold more than one non-FIFA nationality.

No.	Pos.	Nation	Player
—	DF	ARG	Cristian Báez (at (Chile) Deportes Iquique)
—	MF	ARG	Walter Busse (at (Ecuador) Manta)
—	DF	ARG	Federico Gay (at (Argentina) Aldosivi)
—	DF	PAR	Adrián Fernández (at (Argentina) Quilmes Atlético Club)
—	MF	ARG	Lucas Villafáñez ( (Greece) Panetolikos)
—	FW	ARG	Leonel Buter (at (Argentina) Douglas Haig)

== Transfers ==
Players In
Name	Nat	Pos	Moving from
Patricio Vidal	ARG	FW	(Chile) Unión Española
Lucas Villafáñez	ARG	MF	(Argentina) Huracán
Eloy Rodriguez	ARG	FW	(Argentina) Boca Unidos
Maximiliano Herrera	ARG	FW	(Argentina) Chacarita Juniors
Iván Pérez	ARG	MF	(Argentina) San Martín de San Juan
Juan Martín Lucero	ARG	FW	(Argentina) Defensa y Justicia
Jesús Méndez	ARG	MF	(Argentina) Rosario Central
Germán Montoya	ARG	GK	(Argentina) Colon
Claudio Riaño	ARG	FW	(Argentina) Boca Juniors
Rodrigo Gómez	ARG	MF	(Argentina) Argentinos Juniors
Víctor Cuesta	ARG	DF	(Argentina) Arsenal
Sergio Escudero	ARG	DF	(Brazil) Criciúma
Emanuel Aguilera	ARG	DF	(Argentina) Godoy Cruz

Players Out
Name	Nat	Pos	Moving to
Martín Zapata	ARG	MF	(Argentina) Argentinos Juniors
Cristian Menéndez	ARG	FW	(Argentina) Atlético Tucumán
Reinaldo Alderete	ARG	MF	(Argentina) Ferro Carril Oeste
Fabián Assmann	ARG	GK	(Mexico) Mérida
Leonel Buter	ARG	MF	(Argentina) Douglas Haig
Samuel Cáceres	ARG	DF	(Argentina) Nueva Chicago
Adrián Fernández	PAR	FW	(Argentina) Quilmes
Hernán Fredes	ARG	MF	(Argentina) Arsenal
Hilario Navarro	ARG	GK	(Argentina) Estudiantes
Facundo Parra	ARG	MF	(Greece) Asteras Tripolis
Julián Velázquez	ARG	DF	

Position	Staff
Manager	(Argentina) Jorge Almiron

Source: clubaindependiente.com

== Friendlies ==
Win Draw Loss Postponed

12 July 2014 Pre-season	Independiente (Argentina)	1 – 1	(Brazil) Atlético Mineiro	Gran Buenos Aires, Argentina
	Mancuello 17'	Report	Ronaldinho 45' (pen.)	Stadium: Ezeiza Partido; Referee: Ariel Penel

12 July 2014 Pre-season	Independiente (Argentina)	0 – 2	(Brazil) Atlético Mineiro	Gran Buenos Aires, Argentina
		Report	Guilherme; Dátolo	Stadium: Ezeiza Partido; Referee: Ariel Penel

16 July 2014 Pre-season	Independiente	2 – 0	Vélez Sarsfield	Villa Olímpica
9:30	Penco 58'; Mancuello 64'			Stadium: Villa Olímpica, Argentina; Referee: Juan Battaglia

16 July 2014 Pre-season	Independiente	1 – 1	Vélez Sarsfield	Villa Olímpica
9:30	Fausto Grillo 65' (o.g.)		Fausto Grillo 43'	Stadium: Villa Olímpica, Argentina; Referee: Juan Battaglia

19 July 2014 Pre-season	Independiente	0 – 0	Deportivo Armenio	Avellaneda, Buenos Aires
		Report		Stadium: Estadio Libertadores de América

19 July 2014 Pre-season	Independiente	0 – 0	Deportivo Armenio	Avellaneda, Buenos Aires
		Report		Stadium: Estadio Libertadores de América

24 July 2014 Pre-season	Independiente	1 – 0	Villa Dálmine	Avellaneda, Buenos Aires
	Mancuello 32'	Report		Stadium: Estadio Libertadores de América

24 July 2014 Pre-season	Independiente	3 – 0	Villa Dálmine	Avellaneda, Buenos Aires
	Marcelo Vidal 31'; Benítez 74', 79'	Report		Stadium: Estadio Libertadores de América

24 July 2014 Pre-season	Independiente	1 – 1	Temperley	Avellaneda, Buenos Aires
	Diego Rodriguez 53' (pen.)	Report	Dinenno 50'	Stadium: Estadio Libertadores de América; Referee: Pablo Motto

24 July 2014 Pre-season	Independiente	2 – 1	Temperley	Avellaneda, Buenos Aires
	P.Vidal 46'; Eloy Rodriguez 50'	Report	Ariel Rojas 60'	Stadium: Estadio Libertadores de América; Referee: Pablo Motto

== Competitions ==
=== Primera División ===
Win Draw Loss Postponed

10 August 2014 Round 1	Independiente	3 – 0	Atlético de Rafaela	Avellaneda
15:15	Mancuello 44'; Francisco Pizzini 53'; Lucero 74'	Report	Rodrigo Depetris (yellow card) 80'	Stadium: Libertadores de América; Referee: Saúl Laverni

16 August 2014 Round 2	Estudiantes (LP)	1 – 0	Independiente	La Plata
20:30	Desábato (yellow card) 33'; Goñi 38'	Report	Pérez (yellow card) 22'; Jorge Figal (yellow card) 51'; Lucas Villalba (yellow card) 83'; Mancuello (yellow card) 90'	Stadium: Ciudad de La Plata; Referee: Patricio Loustau

23 August 2014 Round 3	Independiente	0 – 4	Vélez Sarsfield	Avellaneda
20:30		Report	Cubero (yellow card) 43'; Lucas Pratto 47', 72'; Leonardo Rolón 80'; Romero 84'	Stadium: Libertadores de América; Referee: Mauro Vigliano

27 August 2014 Round 4	Olimpo	1 – 2	Independiente	Bahía Blanca
19:15	Leonardo Gil (yellow card) 21'; Blanco 50' (pen.), (yellow card) 56', (red card) 74'	Report	Víctor Cuesta (yellow card) 11'; Diego Rodríguez (yellow card) 49'; Méndez (yellow card) 55'; Penco 88'; Mancuello 92'	Stadium: Roberto Natalio Carminatti; Referee: Pablo Lunati

31 August 2014 Round 5	Independiente	2 – 1	Racing Club	Avellaneda
15:15	Penco 24', (yellow card) 25'; Mancuello 27'; Tula (yellow card) 56'; Franco Bellocq (yellow card) 74'	Report	Milito 13', (yellow card) 14'; Yonathan Cabral (yellow card) 84'	Stadium: Libertadores de América; Referee: Fernando Rapallini

6 September 2014 Round 6	Banfield	0 – 1	Independiente	Banfield
20:30	Prichoda (red card) 33'; Jonathan Requena (yellow card) 86'	Report	Rodrigo Gómez (yellow card) 32'; Víctor Cuesta (yellow card) 46'; Mancuello 59'; Néstor Breitenbruch (yellow card) 70'; Lucas Villalba (yellow card) 73'	Stadium: Florencio Solá; Referee: Jorge Baliño

13 September 2014 Round 7	Independiente	5 – 3	Quilmes	Avellaneda
20:30	Diego Rodríguez 26' (pen.), 51' (pen.); Franco Bellocq (yellow card) 39'; Riaño 60', 91'; Tula (yellow card) 68'; Mancuello 93'	Report	Sarmiento 10'; Romero (yellow card) 31'; Klusener 70' (pen.); Joel Carli (yellow card) 75'; Jonathan Zacaría 85'	Stadium: Libertadores de América; Referee: Fernando Echenique

21 September 2014 Round 8	River Plate	4 – 1	Independiente	Buenos Aires
21:30	Pisculichi 3'; Vangioni (yellow card) 7'; Sánchez (yellow card) 11'; Kranevitter (yellow card) 19'; Rojas 37'; Gutiérrez 66'; Mora 77'	Report	Víctor Cuesta (yellow card) 4'; Franco Bellocq (yellow card) 33'; Mancuello 57'; Méndez (yellow card) 67'	Stadium: Monumental Antonio Vespucio Liberti; Referee: Pablo Lunati

27 September 2014 Round 9	Independiente	2 – 0	Rosario Central	Avellaneda
15:30	Jorge Figal (red card) 62'; Mancuello 50'; Francisco Pizzini (yellow card) 57'; Méndez 86'	Report	Rafael Delgado (yellow card) 33'; Musto (yellow card) 55'; Niell (yellow card) 73'; Lucas Acevedo (yellow card) 81'	Stadium: Libertadores de América; Referee: Patricio Loustau

6 October 2014 Round 10	Godoy Cruz	2 – 2	Independiente	Mendoza
20:30	Fernando Zuqui 7'; Ramírez 36'; Aquino (yellow card) 48'; Daniel González (yellow card) 58'	Report	Mancuello 18'; Franco Bellocq (yellow card) 48'; Néstor Breitenbruch (red card) 53'; Alexis Zárate 83', (yellow card) 83'; Riaño (yellow card) 84'; Víctor Cuesta (yellow card) 85'	Stadium: Malvinas Argentinas; Referee: Jorge Baliño

12 October 2014 Round 11	Independiente	1 – 1	Defensa y Justicia	Avellaneda
16:00	Franco Bellocq (yellow card) 79'; Penco 91'	Report	Mariano Barbieri 56'; Camacho (yellow card) 73'; Damián Martínez (yellow card) 85'; Ruis (yellow card) 88'	Stadium: Libertadores de América; Referee: Diego Ceballos

18 October 2014 Round 12	San Lorenzo	1 – 2	Independiente	Buenos Aires
16:00	Yepes (yellow card) 30'; Torrico (yellow card) 70'; Buffarini (yellow card) 71'; Villalba 81'; Juan Mercier (yellow card) 83'	Report	Montenegro 32'; Méndez (yellow card) 42'; Diego Rodríguez 66' (pen.); Víctor Cuesta (yellow card) 80'	Stadium: Pedro Bidegain; Referee: Darío Herrera

25 October 2014 Round 13	Independiente	3 – 1	Tigre	Avellaneda
15:00	Lucero 1', 45+2'; Mancuello 56'; Franco Bellocq (yellow card) 78'	Report	Pablo Vitti 37'	Stadium: Libertadores de América; Referee: Diego Abal

9 November 2014 Round 15	Independiente	0 – 1	Gimnasia y Esgrima (LP)	Avellaneda
	Méndez (yellow card) 68'	Report	Licht 59'	Stadium: Libertadores de América; Referee: Patricio Loustau

13 November 2014 Round 14	Arsenal	1 – 1	Independiente	Sarandí
19:00	Alemán 35'	Report	Penco 72'	Stadium: Julio H. Grondona; Referee: Mauro Vigliano

17 November 2014 Round 16	Independiente	4 – 1	Lanús	Avellaneda
20:30	Penco 27'; Méndez (yellow card) 33'; Montenegro 35'; Alexis Zárate (yellow card) 71'; Lucero 89'; Víctor Cuesta 90+2'	Report	Romero 2'; Facundo Monteseirín (red card) 81'; Velázquez (red card)	Stadium: Libertadores de América; Referee: Germán Delfino

23 November 2014 Round 17	Boca Juniors	v	Independiente	Buenos Aires
		Report		Stadium: Alberto J. Armando

30 December 2014 Round 18	Independiente	v	Newell's Old Boys	Avellaneda
		Report		Stadium: Libertadores de América

7 December 2014 Round 19	Belgrano	v	Independiente	Córdoba
		Report		Stadium: Julio César Villagra

== Season review ==
=== League table ===
Pos	Team	Pld	W	D	L	GF	GA	GD	Pts	Qualification
2	River Plate	19	11	6	2	34	13	+21	39	2015 Copa Libertadores second stage and 2015 Copa Sudamericana Round of 16 (Note: Qualified as 2014 Torneo Final champion and 2014 Copa Sudamericana champion)
3	Lanús	19	10	5	4	28	23	+5	35	2015 Copa Sudamericana second stage
4	Independiente	19	10	3	6	31	29	+2	33	2015 Copa Sudamericana second stage
5	Boca Juniors	19	9	4	6	25	23	+2	31	2015 Copa Libertadores second stage
6	Estudiantes (LP)	19	9	4	6	23	23	0	31	2015 Copa Libertadores first stage (Note: Qualified as 2014 Copa Sudamericana best Argentine team not yet qualified.)

Source: Programación de Primera División Torneo Final 2013/2014

=== Results summary ===
Overall								Home						Away					
Pld	W	D	L	GF	GA	GD	Pts	W	D	L	GF	GA	GD	W	D	L	GF	GA	GD
16	9	3	4	29	22	+7	30	6	1	2	20	12	+8	3	2	2	9	10	−1

Last updated: 18 November 2014.

=== Results by round ===
Round	1	2	3	4	5	6	7	8	9	10	11	12	13	14	15	16	17	18	19
Ground	H	A	H	A	H	A	H	A	H	A	H	A	H	A	H	H	A	H	A
Result	W	L	L	W	W	W	W	L	W	D	D	W	W	D	L	W			
Position	1	7	15	11	6	4	3	4	2	3	3	3	4	4	4	3			

A = Away; H = Home; W = Win; D = Draw; L = Loss

== Copa Argentina ==
9 April 2014 Final Round II	Independiente	4 – 2	Deportivo Santamarina	San Luis
20:00 UTC−03:00	Insúa 26' (pen.), 63'; Fabián Monserrat 35', (yellow card) 40'; Menéndez 65' (pen.); Néstor Breitenbruch (yellow card) 80'; Guillermo Pereira (yellow card) 87'	Report	Ignacio Celaya (yellow card) 25', (goal) 41'; Jorge Peirone (yellow card) 31'; Leonardo Gogna (yellow card) 69'; Maximiliano Timpanaro 71'	Stadium: Estadio Provincial Juan Gilberto Funes; Referee: Carlos Maglio

28 July 2014 Round of 32	Independiente	2 – 0	Belgrano	Buenos Aires
21:15 UTC−03:00	Néstor Breitenbruch (yellow card) 18'; Francisco Pizzini 25', 48'	Report	Pittinari (yellow card) 2'; Turús (yellow card) 66'; Nicolás Ferreyra (yellow card) 75'	Stadium: Florencio Sola; Referee: Silvio Trucco

1 October 2014 Round of 16	Independiente	0 – 2	Estudiantes de La Plata	Sánchez de Loria, San Juan
20:30 UTC−03:00	Franco Bellocq (yellow card) 52'; Mancuello (yellow card) 83'	Report	Jonatan Shunke (yellow card) 50'; Ezequiel Cerutti 75'; Vera 84'	Stadium: San Juan de Bicentenario; Referee: Diego Abal

== Squad statistics ==
Updated on 19 October 2014

			Primera División					Copa Argentina					Total				
Nation	No.	Name		GS	Min.	Goal	Assist		GS	Min.	Goal	Assist		GS	Min.	Goal	Assist
Goalkeepers
(Argentina)	1	Diego Rodríguez	12	12	1,080	2	0	2	2	180	0	0	14	14	1,260	2	0
(Argentina)	12	Facundo Daffonchio	0	0	0	0	0	0	0	0	0	0	0	0	0	0	0
(Argentina)	22	Germán Montoya	0	0	0	0	0	0	0	0	0	0	0	0	0	0	0
(Argentina)	30	Alan Depotte	0	0	0	0	0	0	0	0	0	0	0	0	0	0	0
Defenders
(Argentina)	2	Cristian Tula	9	8	767	0	0	1	1	90	0	0	10	9	857	0	0
(Argentina)	3	Lucas Villalba	10	10	896	0	0	2	2	180	0	0	12	12	1,076	0	0
(Argentina)	4	Néstor Breitenbruch	9	9	716	0	0	2	2	135	0	0	11	11	851	0	0
(Argentina)	6	Sergio Ojeda	4	2	189	0	0	1	0	45	0	0	5	2	234	0	0
(Argentina)	13	Rodrigo Moreira	0	0	0	0	0	0	0	90	0	0	0	0	0	0	0
(Argentina)	15	Jorge Figal	7	6	565	0	0	2	2	180	0	0	9	8	745	0	0
(Argentina)	25	Alexis Zárate	5	3	292	1	0	1	1	90	0	0	6	4	382	1	0
(Argentina)	27	Víctor Cuesta	11	11	990	0	0	1	1	90	0	0	12	12	1,080	0	0
(Argentina)	28	Gabriel Vallés	1	1	45	0	0	0	0	0	0	0	1	1	45	0	0
(Argentina)	31	Rafael Barrios	1	0	33	0	0	0	0	0	0	0	1	0	33	0	0
(Argentina)	34	Sergio Escudero	2	2	114	0	0	0	0	0	0	0	2	2	114	0	0
Midfielders
(Argentina)	5	Franco Bellocq	9	8	710	0	0	2	2	180	0	0	11	10	890	0	0
(Argentina)	8	Jesús Méndez	7	5	476	1	1	1	0	32	0	0	8	5	508	1	1
(Argentina)	10	Federico Insúa	1	0	11	0	1	1	0	22	0	0	2	0	33	0	1
(Argentina)	11	Federico Mancuello	12	12	1,055	8	3	2	2	165	0	0	14	14	1,220	8	3
(Argentina)	14	Fabián Monserrat	0	0	0	0	0	0	0	0	0	0	0	0	0	0	0
(Argentina)	16	Jorge Iván Pérez	1	1	35	0	0	0	0	0	0	0	1	1	35	0	0
(Argentina)	20	Christian Ortiz	0	0	0	0	0	0	0	0	0	0	0	0	0	0	0
(Argentina)	23	Daniel Montenegro	11	11	796	1	4	1	1	69	0	0	12	12	868	1	4
(Argentina)	24	Marcelo Vidal	4	0	102	0	0	1	0	15	0	0	5	0	117	0	0
(Argentina)	26	Rodrigo Gómez	5	5	345	0	0	0	0	0	0	0	5	5	345	0	0
(Argentina)	32	Matías Pisano	10	5	525	0	4	2	2	148	0	1	12	7	673	0	5
(Argentina)	33	Leonel Miranda	0	0	0	0	0	0	0	0	0	0	0	0	0	0	0
(Argentina)	37	Juan Manuel Trejo	0	0	0	0	0	0	0	0	0	0	0	0	0	0	0
Forwards
(Argentina)	7	Francisco Pizzini	10	3	530	1	0	2	2	158	2	0	12	5	688	3	0
(Argentina)	9	Sebastián Penco	6	3	258	3	0	2	1	114	0	0	8	4	372	3	0
(Argentina)	17	Patricio Vidal	0	0	0	0	0	0	0	0	0	0	0	0	0	0	0
(Argentina)	19	Juan Martín Lucero	10	7	659	1	0	1	0	21	0	0	11	7	680	1	0
(Argentina)	21	Claudio Riaño	9	8	643	2	1	1	1	69	0	0	10	9	733	2	1
(Argentina)	29	Martín Benítez	2	0	48	0	0	0	0	0	0	0	2	0	48	0	0
(Argentina)	35	Maximiliano Herrera	0	0	0	0	0	0	0	0	0	0	0	0	0	0	0
(Argentina)	36	Eloy Rodriguez	0	0	0	0	0	0	0	0	0	0	0	0	0	0	0

=== Goals ===
Rank	Player	Position	Primera División	Copa Argentina	Total
1	(Argentina) Federico Mancuello	MF	9	0	9
2	(Argentina) Francisco Pizzini	MF	1	2	3
2	(Argentina) Sebastián Penco	FW	3	0	3
2	(Argentina) Diego Rodríguez	GK	3	0	3
2	(Argentina) Juan Martín Lucero	FW	3	0	3
3	(Argentina) Claudio Riaño	FW	2	0	2
4	(Argentina) Jesús Méndez	MF	1	0	1
4	(Argentina) Alexis Zárate	DF	1	0	1
4	(Argentina) Daniel Montenegro	MF	1	0	1
Total			24	2	26

=== Assists ===
Rank	Player	Position	Primera División	Copa Argentina	Total
1	(Argentina) Matías Pisano	MF	4	1	5
2	(Argentina) Daniel Montenegro	MF	4	0	4
2	(Argentina) Federico Mancuello	MF	4	0	4
3	(Argentina) Claudio Riaño	FW	1	0	1
3	(Argentina) Jesús Méndez	MF	1	0	1
3	(Argentina) Federico Insúa	MF	1	0	1
3	(Argentina) Francisco Pizzini	FW	1	0	1

==== Disciplinary record ====
No.	Pos.	Name			Notes
No.	Pos.	Name	Booked	Sent off (straight red)	
5	DF	Franco Bellocq	6	0	
27	DF	Víctor Cuesta	5	0	
8	MF	Jesús Méndez	4	0	
15	DF	Jorge Figal	2	1	
3	DF	Lucas Villalba	2	0	
2	DF	Cristian Tula	2	0	
4	DF	Néstor Breitenbruch	1	1	
26	MF	Rodrigo Gómez	1	0	
1	GK	Diego Rodríguez	1	0	
9	FW	Sebastián Penco	1	0	
7	FW	Francisco Pizzini	1	0	
21	FW	Claudio Riaño	1	0	

==== Penalties ====
Date	Penalty Taker	Scored	Opponent	Competition
13 September 2014	Diego Rodríguez	Yes	Quilmes	Argentine Primera División
13 September 2014	Diego Rodríguez	Yes	Quilmes	Argentine Primera División
18 October 2014	Diego Rodríguez	Yes	San Lorenzo	Argentine Primera División

=== Overall ===
	Total	Home	Away	Naturel
Games played	16	8	6	2
Games won	9	5	3	1
Games drawn	2	1	1	0
Games lost	5	2	2	1
Biggest win	3-0 vs Atlético Rafaela	3-0 vs Atlético Rafaela	2-1 vs Olimpo; 1-0 vs Banfield	2-0 vs Belgrano
Biggest loss	0-4 vs Vélez Sarsfield	0-4 vs Vélez Sarsfield	1-4 vs River Plate	-
Biggest win (League)	3-0 vs Atlético Rafaela	3-0 vs Atlético Rafaela	2-1 vs Olimpo; 2-1 vs San Lorenzo; 1-0 vs Banfield	
Biggest win (Cup)	2-0 vs Belgrano	-	-	2-0 vs Belgrano
Biggest loss (League)	0-4 vs Vélez Sarsfield	0-4 vs Vélez Sarsfield	1-4 vs River Plate	-
Biggest loss (Cup)	0-2 vs Estudiantes	-	-	0-2 vs Estudiantes
Clean sheets	4	2	1	1
Goals scored	26	16	8	2
Goals conceded	22	11	9	2
Goal difference	4	5	-1	0
Average GF per game	1.63	2	1.33	1
Average GA per game	1.38	1.38	1.5	1
Yellow cards	33	10	20	3
Red cards	2	1	1	0
Most appearances	(Argentina) Diego Rodríguez (Argentina) Federico Mancuello (16)	–		
Most minutes played	(Argentina) Diego Rodríguez (1,440)	–		
Most goals	(Argentina) Federico Mancuello (9)	–		
Winning rate	56.25%	62.5%	50%	50%

Source: Competitive matches
