= 2013–14 Primera B Nacional =

28th season of the second-tier football league in Argentina

Primera B Nacional
- Season: 2013–14
- Champions: Banfield (3rd divisional title)
- Promoted: Banfield; Defensa y Justicia; Independiente
- Relegated: Almirante Brown; Brown; Talleres (C); Villa San Carlos
- Matches: 462
- Goals: 984 (2.13 per match)
- Top goalscorer: Juan Martín Lucero 23 goals

The 2013–14 Primera B Nacional was the 28th season of professional Argentine second division. For this season, the total teams was raised to 22; the champion, runner-up and winner of the tiebreaker playoff were promoted to Primera División.

== Club information ==
| Club | City | Stadium |
|---|---|---|
| Aldosivi | Mar del Plata | José María Minella |
| Almirante Brown | Isidro Casanova | Fragata Presidente Sarmiento |
| Atlético Tucumán | Tucumán | Monumental José Fierro |
| Banfield | Banfield | Florencio Solá |
| Boca Unidos | Corrientes | José Antonio Romero Feris |
| Brown | Adrogué | Lorenzo Arandilla |
| Crucero del Norte | Garupá | Comandante Andrés Guacurarí |
| Defensa y Justicia | Florencio Varela | Norberto "Tito" Tomaghello |
| Douglas Haig | Pergamino | Miguel Morales |
| Ferro Carril Oeste | Buenos Aires | Arquitecto Ricardo Etcheverry |
| Gimnasia y Esgrima | Jujuy | 23 de Agosto |
| Huracán | Buenos Aires | Tomás Adolfo Ducó |
| Independiente | Avellaneda | Libertadores de América |
| Independiente Rivadavia | Mendoza | Bautista Gargantini |
| Instituto | Córdoba | Presidente Perón |
| Patronato | Paraná | Presbítero Bartolomé Grella |
| San Martín | San Juan | Ingeniero Hilario Sánchez |
| Sarmiento | Junín | Eva Perón |
| Sportivo Belgrano | San Francisco | Oscar Boero |
| Talleres | Córdoba | La Boutique |
| Unión | Santa Fe | 15 de Abril |
| Villa San Carlos | Buenos Aires | Genacio Sálice |

== Standings ==
| Pos | Team | Pld | W | D | L | GF | GA | GD | Pts | Promotion or qualification |
|---|---|---|---|---|---|---|---|---|---|---|
| 1 | Banfield (C) | 42 | 22 | 12 | 8 | 71 | 40 | +31 | 78 | Primera División |
| 2 | Defensa y Justicia | 42 | 21 | 12 | 9 | 67 | 45 | +22 | 75 | Primera División |
| 3 | Huracán | 42 | 19 | 10 | 13 | 43 | 30 | +13 | 67 | Tiebreaker Playoff |
| 4 | Independiente (P) | 42 | 17 | 16 | 9 | 49 | 37 | +12 | 67 | Tiebreaker Playoff |
| 5 | Atlético Tucumán | 42 | 16 | 16 | 10 | 44 | 36 | +8 | 64 | |
| 6 | Instituto | 42 | 16 | 14 | 12 | 54 | 46 | +8 | 62 | |
| 7 | Gimnasia y Esgrima (J) | 42 | 16 | 13 | 13 | 41 | 35 | +6 | 61 | |
| 8 | Crucero del Norte | 42 | 16 | 11 | 15 | 45 | 42 | +3 | 59 | |
| 9 | San Martín (SJ) | 42 | 15 | 12 | 15 | 49 | 52 | −3 | 57 | |
| 10 | Unión | 42 | 12 | 19 | 11 | 48 | 48 | 0 | 55 | |
| 11 | Independiente Rivadavia | 42 | 12 | 19 | 11 | 50 | 51 | −1 | 55 | |
| 12 | Sarmiento | 42 | 15 | 10 | 17 | 45 | 47 | −2 | 55 | |
| 13 | Ferro Carril Oeste | 42 | 13 | 16 | 13 | 35 | 39 | −4 | 55 | |
| 14 | Boca Unidos | 42 | 12 | 18 | 12 | 43 | 46 | −3 | 54 | |
| 15 | Sportivo Belgrano | 42 | 14 | 11 | 17 | 39 | 40 | −1 | 53 | |
| 16 | Aldosivi | 42 | 11 | 18 | 13 | 42 | 47 | −5 | 51 | |
| 17 | Douglas Haig | 42 | 11 | 18 | 13 | 35 | 44 | −9 | 51 | |
| 18 | Brown | 42 | 13 | 11 | 18 | 45 | 50 | −5 | 50 | |
| 19 | Patronato | 42 | 11 | 16 | 15 | 30 | 34 | −4 | 49 | |
| 20 | Talleres (C) | 42 | 10 | 15 | 17 | 48 | 58 | −10 | 45 | |
| 21 | Almirante Brown | 42 | 9 | 15 | 18 | 30 | 48 | −18 | 42 | |
| 22 | Villa San Carlos | 42 | 4 | 12 | 26 | 31 | 69 | −38 | 24 | |

Updated to match(es) played on June 8, 2014. Source: AFA
Rules for classification: 1st points; 2nd goal difference; 3rd goals scored; 4th head-to-head points; 5th head-to-head goal difference; 6th head-to-head goals scored. This does not apply to determining the champion. If two or more teams had been tied in point at the end of the tournament, a playoff would have been held at a neutral venue within 72 hours for the championship
(C) Champions; (P) Promoted

=== 3rd. promotion playoff ===
Since Huracán and Independiente finished tied in points, a one-match playoff had to be held to determine the 3rd. team to promote to Primera División. The match was played on June 11 at Estadio Único in La Plata.

Third promotion playoff
11 June 2014

| Independiente | 2–0 | Huracán |
|---|---|---|
| Zapata 37'; Pizzini 86' | Report |

Estadio Único, La Plata
Referee: Diego Ceballos

Team details

Independiente
Huracán

| GK | 1 | Diego Rodríguez |
| DF | 4 | Jorge Figal |
| DF | 2 | Cristian Tula |
| DF | 6 | Sergio Ojeda |
| DF | 3 | Claudio Morel Rodríguez |
| MF | 8 | Martín Zapata | (yellow card) 35' |
| MF | 5 | Franco Bellocq | (yellow card) 9' |
| MF | 11 | Federico Mancuello | | (substituted off) 90' |
| MF | 7 | Matías Pisano | | (substituted off) 66' |
| MF | 10 | Daniel Montenegro | (yellow card) 47' | (substituted off) 78' |
| FW | 9 | Sebastián Penco |
Substitutions:
| FW | 16 | Francisco Pizzini | | (substituted on) 66' (yellow card) 89' |
| MF | 14 | Hernán Fredes | | (substituted on) 78' |
| MF | 18 | Federico Insúa | | (substituted on) 90' |
Manager:
(Argentina) Omar De Felippe

| GK | 1 | Marcos Díaz |
| DF | 8 | Germán Mandarino | | (substituted off) 78' |
| DF | 2 | Federico Mancinelli |
| DF | 6 | Eduardo Domínguez | (yellow card) 28' |
| DF | 3 | Carlos Arano | (yellow card) (red card) 87' |
| MF | 11 | Patricio Toranzo |
| MF | 4 | Víctor Cuesta |
| MF | 5 | Alejandro Capurro | | (substituted off) 82' |
| FW | 7 | Cristian Espinoza | | (substituted off) 71' |
| FW | 9 | Leandro Caruso |
| FW | 10 | Pity Martínez |
Substitutions:
| FW | 18 | Ramón Ábila | | (substituted on) 71' (yellow card) 88' |
| MF | 16 | Lucas Villafáñez | | (substituted on) 78' |
| MF | 17 | Alejandro Romero | | (substituted on) 82' |
Manager:
(Argentina) Frank Kudelka

Note: Independiente promoted to Primera División.

== Results ==
| Home \ Away | ALD | ALM | ATU | BAN | BOU | BRO | CRU | DYJ | DOU | FCO | GJU | HUR | IND | IRV | INS | PAT | SMA | SAR | SPB | TAL | UNI | VSC |
|---|---|---|---|---|---|---|---|---|---|---|---|---|---|---|---|---|---|---|---|---|---|---|
| Aldosivi | | 3–0 | 1–1 | 0–3 | 2–2 | 0–0 | 0–1 | 1–2 | 4–0 | 0–1 | 1–0 | 1–1 | 0–0 | 0–1 | 1–0 | 0–0 | 4–1 | 0–0 | 0–0 | 1–0 | 1–0 | 3–2 |
| Almirante Brown | 1–1 | | 2–0 | 1–1 | 1–0 | 0–2 | 0–1 | 0–0 | 0–0 | 1–1 | 1–3 | 0–1 | 1–0 | 1–1 | 1–1 | 0–0 | 0–0 | 2–4 | 0–1 | 1–1 | 0–1 | 2–1 |
| Atlético Tucumán | 2–0 | 0–1 | | 0–0 | 0–1 | 0–0 | 1–0 | 1–1 | 3–0 | 2–2 | 2–1 | 2–0 | 2–1 | 1–1 | 2–2 | 1–2 | 1–0 | 1–0 | 3–2 | 1–0 | 1–1 | 2–2 |
| Banfield | 3–0 | 2–1 | 0–0 | | 3–0 | 2–1 | 2–0 | 3–0 | 1–1 | 3–0 | 2–0 | 0–2 | 3–3 | 4–0 | 0–0 | 2–0 | 2–1 | 3–0 | 0–2 | 2–1 | 4–2 | 4–2 |
| Boca Unidos | 1–3 | 0–0 | 1–1 | 2–1 | | 2–0 | 1–0 | 2–1 | 1–1 | 0–0 | 1–1 | 0–0 | 0–0 | 3–0 | 1–1 | 2–1 | 1–1 | 1–0 | 1–2 | 1–1 | 3–0 | 3–0 |
| Brown (A) | 1–1 | 0–2 | 1–0 | 0–1 | 1–1 | | 1–2 | 1–3 | 2–2 | 2–3 | 2–0 | 0–0 | 1–2 | 0–1 | 2–0 | 1–0 | 1–2 | 1–0 | 0–0 | 2–2 | 4–4 | 2–1 |
| Crucero del Norte | 1–1 | 2–0 | 1–1 | 0–1 | 6–0 | 1–3 | | 2–2 | 2–0 | 2–0 | 2–0 | 0–0 | 3–1 | 2–1 | 1–0 | 1–0 | 1–0 | 0–1 | 2–1 | 1–0 | 0–0 | 1–1 |
| Defensa y Justicia | 3–0 | 1–0 | 1–0 | 5–3 | 2–0 | 2–1 | 3–1 | | 4–0 | 0–1 | 3–1 | 1–0 | 0–0 | 2–2 | 1–0 | 1–0 | 3–0 | 2–0 | 4–0 | 1–3 | 0–0 | 2–1 |
| Douglas Haig | 1–1 | 3–0 | 0–0 | 0–0 | 0–0 | 1–0 | 1–0 | 4–1 | | 0–0 | 2–0 | 1–0 | 1–2 | 1–1 | 1–0 | 0–2 | 2–2 | 1–1 | 1–0 | 1–0 | 2–0 | 1–1 |
| Ferro Carril Oeste | 2–1 | 0–1 | 2–0 | 1–1 | 2–2 | 1–0 | 2–0 | 1–0 | 0–0 | | 0–2 | 1–2 | 1–1 | 3–0 | 1–0 | 0–0 | 1–0 | 3–0 | 1–0 | 1–1 | 0–1 | 0–0 |
| Gimnasia y Esgrima (J) | 3–1 | 3–0 | 0–1 | 1–0 | 1–0 | 2–0 | 3–1 | 1–1 | 0–0 | 0–0 | | 1–0 | 1–0 | 1–1 | 1–1 | 0–0 | 1–1 | 0–0 | 2–1 | 1–2 | 1–0 | 0–0 |
| Huracán | 4–1 | 1–1 | 2–0 | 3–0 | 2–0 | 0–1 | 2–1 | 1–1 | 2–1 | 0–0 | 0–1 | | 0–1 | 2–2 | 1–3 | 3–0 | 2–0 | 3–1 | 1–0 | 2–0 | 1–0 | 1–0 |
| Independiente | 2–2 | 1–1 | 1–3 | 1–1 | 1–1 | 1–2 | 2–1 | 2–1 | 2–0 | 3–0 | 1–0 | 0–1 | | 0–0 | 2–0 | 0–0 | 2–0 | 2–1 | 3–2 | 3–0 | 1–1 | 0–0 |
| Independiente Rivadavia | 2–2 | 1–0 | 2–0 | 3–0 | 0–0 | 0–0 | 0–0 | 1–1 | 1–1 | 0–0 | 0–0 | 1–2 | 2–1 | | 1–2 | 1–1 | 3–4 | 3–1 | 2–1 | 3–2 | 2–0 | 2–0 |
| Instituto | 1–1 | 2–1 | 2–2 | 1–2 | 1–1 | 2–1 | 4–1 | 1–1 | 2–0 | 0–0 | 2–1 | 1–0 | 1–2 | 2–2 | | 2–1 | 3–0 | 2–1 | 1–0 | 1–1 | 1–3 | 3–2 |
| Patronato | 1–1 | 0–0 | 0–1 | 0–2 | 1–0 | 1–1 | 2–0 | 1–1 | 2–0 | 0–0 | 1–1 | 2–0 | 0–1 | 1–0 | 0–0 | | 1–0 | 1–1 | 0–2 | 1–0 | 0–1 | 2–2 |
| San Martín (SJ) | 3–0 | 1–1 | 1–1 | 0–3 | 2–0 | 3–1 | 1–1 | 0–1 | 2–1 | 2–0 | 2–1 | 3–0 | 0–0 | 4–3 | 2–1 | 0–2 | | 2–0 | 1–0 | 2–0 | 1–1 | 1–1 |
| Sarmiento | 0–1 | 2–1 | 0–0 | 0–0 | 0–1 | 1–0 | 0–0 | 2–4 | 1–0 | 4–1 | 0–1 | 1–0 | 2–0 | 1–1 | 1–3 | 0–2 | 2–2 | | 4–0 | 3–0 | 1–0 | 1–0 |
| Sportivo Belgrano | 0–0 | 3–1 | 0–1 | 3–1 | 1–0 | 3–0 | 0–0 | 4–2 | 2–0 | 1–0 | 0–0 | 0–1 | 0–1 | 1–0 | 0–0 | 1–0 | 0–0 | 0–2 | | 0–0 | 1–1 | 1–1 |
| Talleres (C) | 2–0 | 0–1 | 1–2 | 2–2 | 2–1 | 1–4 | 2–2 | 0–0 | 1–1 | 3–1 | 0–1 | 0–0 | 2–2 | 3–1 | 1–2 | 3–1 | 1–1 | 1–0 | 1–0 | | 1–1 | 3–2 |
| Unión | 1–1 | 2–1 | 1–1 | 1–1 | 4–4 | 0–2 | 1–0 | 3–1 | 1–1 | 3–2 | 1–3 | 0–0 | 0–0 | 1–1 | 2–0 | 1–1 | 3–1 | 0–1 | 2–2 | 1–1 | | 1–0 |
| Villa San Carlos | 0–1 | 1–2 | 0–2 | 0–3 | 0–2 | 1–2 | 1–1 | 1–2 | 0–2 | 1–0 | 2–1 | 0–0 | 0–1 | 0–1 | 1–3 | 1–0 | 1–1 | 1–3 | 0–2 | 3–2 | 0–3 | |

Updated to match(es) played on May 31, 2014. Source: AFA
Legend: Blue = home team win; Yellow = draw; Red = away team win.

== Relegation ==
The bottom two teams of this table faced relegation. Clubs with an indirect affiliation with Argentine Football Association are relegated to the Torneo Argentino A, while clubs directly affiliated face relegation to Primera B Metropolitana.

| Pos | Team | 2011–12 Pts | 2012–13 Pts | 2013–14 Pts | Total Pts | Total Pld | Avg | Relegation | Affiliation |
|---|---|---|---|---|---|---|---|---|---|
| 1 | Banfield | — | 58 | 78 | 136 | 80 | 1.7 | | Direct |
| 2 | Independiente | — | — | 67 | 67 | 42 | 1.595 | | Direct |
| 3 | Defensa y Justicia | 54 | 57 | 75 | 186 | 118 | 1.576 | | Direct |
| 4 | Instituto | 70 | 39 | 62 | 171 | 118 | 1.449 | | Indirect |
| 5 | Huracán | 46 | 54 | 67 | 167 | 118 | 1.415 | | Direct |
| 6 | Sarmiento (J) | — | 58 | 55 | 113 | 80 | 1.413 | | Direct |
| 7 | Patronato | 56 | 56 | 49 | 161 | 118 | 1.364 | | Indirect |
| 8 | San Martín (SJ) | — | — | 57 | 57 | 42 | 1.357 | | Indirect |
| 9 | Atlético Tucumán | 42 | 51 | 64 | 157 | 118 | 1.331 | | Indirect |
| 10 | Boca Unidos | 57 | 45 | 54 | 156 | 114 | 1.322 | | Indirect |
| 11 | Unión | — | — | 55 | 55 | 42 | 1.31 | | Direct |
| 12 | Ferro Carril Oeste | 56 | 43 | 55 | 154 | 118 | 1.305 | | Direct |
| 13 | Crucero del Norte | — | 45 | 59 | 104 | 80 | 1.3 | | Indirect |
| 14 | Sportivo Belgrano | — | — | 53 | 53 | 42 | 1.262 | | Indirect |
| 15 | Aldosivi | 53 | 44 | 51 | 148 | 118 | 1.254 | | Indirect |
| 16 | Independiente Rivadavia | 45 | 48 | 55 | 148 | 118 | 1.254 | | Indirect |
| 17 | Douglas Haig | — | 49 | 51 | 100 | 80 | 1.25 | | Indirect |
| 18 | Gimnasia y Esgrima (J) | 34 | 50 | 61 | 145 | 118 | 1.229 | | Indirect |
| 19 | Almirante Brown (R) | 55 | 46 | 42 | 143 | 118 | 1.212 | Primera B Metropolitana | Direct |
| 20 | Brown (R) | — | — | 50 | 50 | 42 | 1.19 | Primera B Metropolitana | Direct |
| 21 | Talleres (C) (R) | — | — | 45 | 45 | 42 | 1.071 | Torneo Argentino A | Indirect |
| 22 | Villa San Carlos (R) | — | — | 24 | 24 | 42 | 0.571 | Primera B Metropolitana | Direct |

Updated to games played on 8 June 2014.

== Season statistics ==
=== Top scorers ===
| Rank | Player | Club | Goals |
|---|---|---|---|
| 1 | (Argentina) Juan Martín Lucero | Defensa y Justicia | 23 |
| 2 | (Argentina) Gonzalo Klusener | Talleres (C) | 18 |
| 3 | (Paraguay) Ernesto Alvarez | Crucero del Norte | 17 |
| 4 | (Argentina) Andrés Chávez | Banfield | 16 |
| 4 | (Paraguay) Santiago Salcedo | Banfield | 16 |
| 5 | (Argentina) Mariano Guerreiro | Brown (A) | 14 |
| 5 | (Argentina) Juan Martín | Instituto | 14 |

== See also ==
- 2013–14 in Argentine football
