= Rafael Barrios =

Argentine footballer (born 1993)

Personal information
- Full name: Rafael Victoriano Barrios
- Date of birth: 23 May 1993 (age 33)
- Place of birth: Corrientes, Argentina
- Height: 1.78 m (5 ft 10 in)
- Position: Right-back

Team information
- Current team: Barracas Central
- Number: 13

Senior career*
| Years | Team | Apps | (Gls) |
| 2013–2016 | Independiente | 6 | (0) |
| 2016–2019 | Defensa y Justicia | 5 | (0) |
| 2018–2019 | → All Boys (loan) | 12 | (0) |
| 2019–2020 | San Martín SJ | 13 | (0) |
| 2020–2021 | Nueva Chicago | 17 | (0) |
| 2021–2022 | Quilmes | 30 | (1) |
| 2023–2024 | Agropecuario | 43 | (0) |
| 2024–2025 | Central Córdoba SdE | 20 | (1) |
| 2025– | Barracas Central | 37 | (0) |
- * Club domestic league appearances and goals as of 17:04, 3 June 2026 (UTC)

Rafael Victoriano Barrios (born 23 May 1993) is an Argentine professional footballer who plays as a right-back for Barracas Central.

== Career ==
Barrios began his senior career in 2013 with Primera B Nacional team Independiente, making his debut in the Copa Argentina in a 1–0 defeat to Arsenal de Sarandí on 12 June. In August 2014, following Independiente's promotion, Barrios made his first Argentine Primera División appearance as a 58th-minute substitute in a 3–0 win versus Atlético de Rafaela. Just five more appearances followed throughout 2014, 2015 and 2016. In June 2016, Barrios joined Defensa y Justicia in a swap deal for Damián Martínez. He made his debut for Defensa on 7 November in a goalless draw against Aldosivi.

He completed a loan move to All Boys on 12 August 2018.

== Career statistics ==
As of 6 September 2018.

Club statistics
| Club | Season | League | | | Cup (Note: Includes the Copa Argentina) | | League Cup | | Continental (Note: Includes the Copa Sudamericana) | | Other | | Total | |
| Club | Season | Division | Apps | Goals | Apps | Goals | Apps | Goals | Apps | Goals | Apps | Goals | Apps | Goals |
|---|---|---|---|---|---|---|---|---|---|---|---|---|---|---|
| Independiente | 2012–13 | Primera División | 0 | 0 | 1 | 0 | — | | 0 | 0 | 0 | 0 | 1 | 0 |
| Independiente | 2013–14 | Primera B Nacional | 0 | 0 | 0 | 0 | — | | — | | 0 | 0 | 0 | 0 |
| Independiente | 2014 | Primera División | 4 | 0 | 0 | 0 | — | | — | | 0 | 0 | 4 | 0 |
| Independiente | 2015 | Primera División | 0 | 0 | 0 | 0 | — | | 0 | 0 | 0 | 0 | 0 | 0 |
| Independiente | 2016 | Primera División | 2 | 0 | 0 | 0 | — | | — | | 0 | 0 | 2 | 0 |
| Independiente | Total | | 6 | 0 | 1 | 0 | — | | 0 | 0 | 0 | 0 | 7 | 0 |
| Defensa y Justicia | 2016–17 | Primera División | 5 | 0 | 0 | 0 | — | | 0 | 0 | 0 | 0 | 5 | 0 |
| Defensa y Justicia | 2017–18 | Primera División | 0 | 0 | 0 | 0 | — | | 0 | 0 | 0 | 0 | 0 | 0 |
| Defensa y Justicia | 2018–19 | Primera División | 0 | 0 | 0 | 0 | — | | 1 (Note: One appearance in 2018 Copa Sudamericana) | 0 | 0 | 0 | 1 | 0 |
| Defensa y Justicia | Total | | 5 | 0 | 0 | 0 | — | | 1 | 0 | 0 | 0 | 6 | 0 |
| All Boys (loan) | 2018–19 | Primera B Metropolitana | 4 | 0 | 0 | 0 | — | | — | | 0 | 0 | 4 | 0 |
| Career total | | | 15 | 0 | 1 | 0 | — | | 1 | 0 | 0 | 0 | 17 | 0 |

== Honours ==
Central Córdoba (SdE)

- Copa Argentina: 2024
