= Federico Gay (footballer) =

Argentine professional footballer

Personal information
- Full name: Federico Axel Gay
- Date of birth: 7 December 1991 (age 34)
- Place of birth: Avellaneda, Argentina
- Height: 1.87 m (6 ft 2 in)
- Position: Defender

Team information
- Current team: Comunicaciones

Youth career
- Independiente

Senior career*
Years	Team	Apps	(Gls)
2012–2015	Independiente	0	(0)
2013–2014	→ Aldosivi (loan)	5	(0)
2014	→ Chacarita Juniors (loan)	8	(0)
2015	→ Sportivo Italiano (loan)	0	(0)
2016	Fénix	0	(0)
2016–	Comunicaciones	35	(0)
- * Club domestic league appearances and goals as of 23:18, 10 May 2019 (UTC)

Federico Axel Gay (born 7 December 1991) is an Argentine professional footballer who plays as a defender for Comunicaciones.

== Career ==
Gay's career began with Independiente. He didn't appear in the Primera División, though was an unused substitute on four occasions. He made a sole appearance for them in the Copa Argentina on 12 June 2013, coming off the bench at the interval of a 1–0 defeat; though his bow lasted just thirty-four minutes after he received a red card on eighty minutes. Across the following eighteen months, Gay made loan moves to Aldosivi and Chacarita Juniors, where he won promotion. A total of fourteen matches came in Primera B Nacional and Primera B Metropolitana. A third loan was sealed in 2015 to Sportivo Italiano.

January 2016 saw Gay join Fénix. However, like with Sportivo Italiano, the defender didn't feature in Primera B Metropolitana. Comunicaciones signed Gay on 21 August 2016. He participated twenty-one times in two seasons with the club, including for his debut on 5 November 2016 in a goalless draw away to Almirante Brown.

== Career statistics ==
As of 10 May 2019.

Appearances and goals by club, season and competition
Club	Season	League			Cup		League Cup		Continental		Other		Total	
Club	Season	Division	Apps	Goals	Apps	Goals	Apps	Goals	Apps	Goals	Apps	Goals	Apps	Goals
Independiente	2011–12	Primera División	0	0	0	0	—		0	0	0	0	0	0
Independiente	2012–13	Primera División	0	0	1	0	—		0	0	0	0	1	0
Independiente	2013–14	Primera B Nacional	0	0	0	0	—		—		0	0	0	0
Independiente	2014	Primera División	0	0	0	0	—		—		0	0	0	0
Independiente	2015	Primera División	0	0	0	0	—		0	0	0	0	0	0
Independiente	Total		0	0	1	0	—		0	0	0	0	1	0
Aldosivi (loan)	2013–14	Primera B Nacional	5	0	1	0	—		—		0	0	6	0
Chacarita Juniors (loan)	2014	Primera B Metropolitana	8	0	0	0	—		—		0	0	8	0
Sportivo Italiano (loan)	2015	Primera B Metropolitana	0	0	0	0	—		—		0	0	0	0
Fénix	2016	Primera B Metropolitana	0	0	0	0	—		—		0	0	0	0
Comunicaciones	2016–17	Primera B Metropolitana	9	0	0	0	—		—		0	0	9	0
Comunicaciones	2017–18	Primera B Metropolitana	12	0	0	0	—		—		0	0	12	0
Comunicaciones	2018–19	Primera B Metropolitana	14	0	0	0	—		—		0	0	14	0
Comunicaciones	Total		35	0	0	0	—		—		0	0	35	0
Career total			48	0	2	0	—		0	0	0	0	50	0
