= Seccafien =

Seccafien is a surname of Italian origin. Notable people with the surname include:

- Andrea Seccafien (born 1990), Canadian long-distance runner
- Enrique Seccafien (born 1984), Argentine football midfielder
