= Sergio Ojeda (footballer) =

Argentine association football player

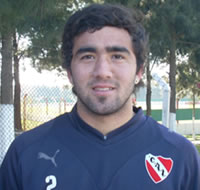

Personal information
- Full name: Sergio Maximiliano Ojeda
- Date of birth: 4 January 1992 (age 34)
- Place of birth: Río Cuarto, Argentina
- Height: 1.83 m (6 ft 0 in)
- Position: Centre-back

Team information
- Current team: Estudiantes RC
- Number: 30

Senior career*
| Years | Team | Apps | (Gls) |
| 2013–2018 | Independiente | 19 | (2) |
| 2015 | → Gimnasia Jujuy (loan) | 30 | (3) |
| 2016–2017 | → Gimnasia Jujuy (loan) | 49 | (0) |
| 2017–2018 | → Olimpo (loan) | 10 | (0) |
| 2018 | Deportes La Serena | 14 | (2) |
| 2019–2021 | Deportivo Cuenca | 39 | (0) |
| 2021–2024 | Patronato | 47 | (1) |
| 2024–2025 | Nacional | 9 | (0) |
| 2025– | Estudiantes RC | 50 | (1) |
- * Club domestic league appearances and goals as of 17:39, 8 November 2026 (UTC)

Sergio Maximiliano Ojeda (born 4 January 1992) is an Argentine professional footballer who plays as a centre-back for Estudiantes RC.

== Career ==
Ojeda started his career with Independiente, making his professional debut on 24 February 2013 in an Argentine Primera División win over Racing Club. In his ninth league appearance for Independiente, Ojeda scored his first senior goal in a 2–0 victory against San Martín on 9 May 2014. On 18 January 2015, Ojeda was signed on loan by Gimnasia y Esgrima of Primera B Nacional. Three goals in thirty matches followed during 2015. He returned to Independiente at the end of 2015, but was soon resigned on loan by Gimnasia y Esgrima in 2016. He remained for two seasons and made forty-nine appearances.

In July 2017, Ojeda joined fellow Primera División side Olimpo on loan. His first appearance for Olimpo arrived on 2 December versus Chacarita Juniors. A move to Deportes La Serena of Chile's Primera B was completed in July 2018. In January 2019, after featuring fourteen times and scoring twice, Ojeda moved to Ecuador to join Deportivo Cuenca.

On 17 February 2021, Ojeda joined Patronato on a deal until the end of 2022.

== Career statistics ==
As of 23 January 2019.

Club statistics
| Club | Season | League | | | Cup | | Continental | | Other | | Total | |
| Club | Season | Division | Apps | Goals | Apps | Goals | Apps | Goals | Apps | Goals | Apps | Goals |
|---|---|---|---|---|---|---|---|---|---|---|---|---|
| Independiente | 2012–13 | Primera División | 2 | 0 | 2 | 0 | 0 | 0 | 0 | 0 | 4 | 0 |
| Independiente | 2013–14 | Primera B Nacional | 13 | 2 | 0 | 0 | — | | 1 (Note: Appearance(s) in the Primera B Nacional play-offs) | 0 | 14 | 2 |
| Independiente | 2014 | Primera División | 4 | 0 | 1 | 0 | — | | 0 | 0 | 5 | 0 |
| Independiente | 2015 | Primera División | 0 | 0 | 0 | 0 | 0 | 0 | 0 | 0 | 0 | 0 |
| Independiente | 2016 | Primera División | 0 | 0 | 0 | 0 | — | | 0 | 0 | 0 | 0 |
| Independiente | 2016–17 | Primera División | 0 | 0 | 0 | 0 | 0 | 0 | 0 | 0 | 0 | 0 |
| Independiente | 2017–18 | Primera División | 0 | 0 | 0 | 0 | 0 | 0 | 0 | 0 | 0 | 0 |
| Independiente | Total | | 19 | 2 | 3 | 0 | 0 | 0 | 1 | 0 | 23 | 2 |
| Gimnasia y Esgrima (loan) | 2015 | Primera B Nacional | 30 | 3 | 0 | 0 | — | | 0 | 0 | 30 | 3 |
| Gimnasia y Esgrima (loan) | 2016 | Primera B Nacional | 18 | 0 | 1 | 0 | — | | 0 | 0 | 19 | 0 |
| Gimnasia y Esgrima (loan) | 2016–17 | Primera B Nacional | 31 | 0 | 0 | 0 | — | | 0 | 0 | 31 | 0 |
| Gimnasia y Esgrima (loan) | Total | | 79 | 3 | 1 | 0 | — | | 0 | 0 | 80 | 3 |
| Olimpo (loan) | 2017–18 | Primera División | 10 | 0 | 0 | 0 | — | | 0 | 0 | 10 | 0 |
| Deportes La Serena | 2018 | Primera B | 14 | 2 | 0 | 0 | — | | 0 | 0 | 14 | 2 |
| Deportivo Cuenca | 2019 | Serie A | 0 | 0 | — | | — | | 0 | 0 | 0 | 0 |
| Career total | | | 122 | 7 | 4 | 0 | 0 | 0 | 1 | 0 | 127 | 7 |
