= José Montiel (footballer) =

Paraguayan footballer (born 1988)

Personal information
- Full name: José Arnulfo Montiel Núñez
- Date of birth: 19 March 1988 (age 38)
- Place of birth: Asunción, Paraguay
- Height: 1.73 m (5 ft 8 in)
- Positions: Attacking midfielder; forward

Youth career
- Olimpia Asunción

Senior career*
Years	Team	Apps	(Gls)
2004–2006	Olimpia Asunción	38	(5)
2006–2007	Udinese	8	(0)
2007–2012	Reggina	21	(2)
2008–2009	→ Politehnica Iaşi (loan)	18	(2)
2009–2010	→ Tigre (loan)	10	(0)
2012–2014	Benevento	49	(5)
2014	Olimpia Asunción	14	(0)
2015	Nacional Asunción	11	(0)
2016–2017	Union Comercio	35	(5)
2017	Sport Huancayo	29	(8)
2018	Al-Shamal		
2018	Ayacucho	14	(0)
2019	Panachaiki	4	(0)
2020	12 de Octubre	14	(2)
2020	Guaireña	12	(0)
2021	12 de Octubre	5	(0)
2021	General Caballero JLM		
2022	Deportivo Santaní		
2022–2023	CD Itapuense		
2024–2025	12 de Octubre		

International career
2005–2008	Paraguay	9	(0)
2007	Paraguay U20	7	(0)
- * Club domestic league appearances and goals as of 09:58, 17 July 2022 (UTC)

José Arnulfo Montiel Núñez (born 19 March 1988 in Asunción) is a Paraguayan former footballer who played as a midfielder.

== Career ==
At a very young age, Montiel began his career in his hometown team Olimpia, which is a division of Olimpia Asunción in Itauguá city's football league. Scouts from Olimpia Asunción noticed his talent and signed him to the youth divisions of the Asunción club. Montiel was a key part of the Paraguay national under-15 football team that won the 2004 South American Under-15 Championship.

His professional debut came playing for Olimpia late in 2004, at the age of 16. Montiel's excellent vision and skills secured him a place in the first squad. In 2005, he was included in the Paraguay national football team at the age of 17.

After the 2006 World Cup, Montiel joined Udinese Calcio. Following one season with the club, he was sold to Reggina. In the 2008–2009 season, he was loaned to the Romanian Liga I team Politenica Iaşi, helping them to avoid relegation.

For the 2009–2010 season, Montiel was loaned to the Argentine club Tigre, making his debut on the 2nd day of Apertura 2009 tournament. He substituted Lucas Oviedo in the game against Rosario Central. He returned to Italy in March 2010. In the season 2010/2011 he is bought to definitive title by the Reggina.

Following a period at Benevento between 2012 and 2014. Montiel returned to Olimpia for the 2014 Clausura where he played 14 games before moving to the Copa Libertadores finalist Nacional Asunción in 2015. In 2016, he has signed a one-year contract with the Peruvian side Unión Comercio.

Ahead of the 2020 season, Montiel joined 12 de Octubre. 10 months later, in October 2020, he moved to Guaireña. However, he returned to 12 de Octubre again in January 2021. In July 2021, he moved to General Caballero JLM. Ahead of the 2022 season, Montiel signed with Deportivo Santaní.
