= Germán Mandarino =

Argentine professional footballer

Personal information
- Date of birth: 13 December 1984 (age 41)
- Place of birth: Morón, Argentina
- Height: 1.72 m (5 ft 8 in)
- Position: Midfielder

Team information
- Current team: Barracas Central

Senior career*
Years	Team	Apps	(Gls)
2007–2009	General Lamadrid	56	(11)
2009	Tristán Suárez	19	(2)
2009–2010	Acassuso	39	(11)
2010–2011	Almirante Brown	30	(2)
2011–2013	Quilmes	42	(3)
2013–2016	Huracán	52	(0)
2016–	Barracas Central	83	(13)
- * Club domestic league appearances and goals as of 11:47, 4 May 2019 (UTC)

Germán Mandarino (born 13 December 1984) is an Argentine professional footballer who plays as a midfielder for Barracas Central.

== Career ==
Mandarino began featuring for General Lamadrid in 2007, as he scored eleven goals in fifty-six appearances in Primera C Metropolitana up until 2009. In early 2009, Mandarino joined Tristán Suárez of Primera B Metropolitana. In the succeeding July, Mandarino was signed by fellow third tier team Acassuso. Eleven goals arrived in his sole season with them, which included a brace in a January 2010 fixture with Brown. On 30 June 2010, Mandarino agreed terms with Primera B Nacional's Almirante Brown. He made the first of thirty appearances for them against CAI on 19 August, with his first goal coming the month after versus Boca Unidos.

In July 2011, Quilmes became Mandarino's fifth senior team. The club won promotion from the 2011–12 Primera B Nacional, with the midfielder subsequently making seventeen appearances in the top-flight in 2012–13; as he also scored against San Lorenzo. Mandarino returned to tier two on 6 July 2013, signing for Huracán. Fifty-six appearances followed in the next two campaigns, which concluded with the club being promoted to the Primera División. However, just one league game came in 2015 and 2016; though he did play in the Copa Libertadores. He also played in the Copa Argentina whilst with them, scoring versus Atlético de Rafaela.

August 2016 saw Mandarino join Primera B Metropolitana side Barracas Central. Mandarino scored six and five goals in his opening two seasons with Barracas Central, while his third campaign culminated with promotion as champions to Primera B Nacional.

== Career statistics ==
As of 4 May 2019.

Appearances and goals by club, season and competition
Club	Season	League			Cup		League Cup		Continental		Other		Total	
Club	Season	Division	Apps	Goals	Apps	Goals	Apps	Goals	Apps	Goals	Apps	Goals	Apps	Goals
Tristán Suárez	2008–09	Primera B Metropolitana	19	2	0	0	—		—		0	0	19	2
Acassuso	2009–10	Primera B Metropolitana	39	11	0	0	—		—		0	0	39	11
Almirante Brown	2010–11	Primera B Nacional	30	2	0	0	—		—		0	0	30	2
Quilmes	2011–12	Primera B Nacional	25	2	3	0	—		—		0	0	28	2
Quilmes	2012–13	Primera División	17	1	0	0	—		—		0	0	17	1
Quilmes	Total		42	3	3	0	—		—		0	0	45	3
Huracán	2013–14	Primera B Nacional	36	0	0	0	—		—		1 (Note: Appearance(s) in the Primera B Nacional play-offs)	0	37	0
Huracán	2014	Primera B Nacional	15	0	4	1	—		—		0	0	19	1
Huracán	2015	Primera División	0	0	0	0	—		0	0	0	0	0	0
Huracán	2016	Primera División	1	0	0	0	—		2 (Note: Appearance(s) in the Copa Libertadores)	0	0	0	3	0
Huracán	Total		52	0	4	1	—		2	0	1	0	59	1
Barracas Central	2016–17	Primera B Metropolitana	30	6	0	0	—		—		1 (Note: Appearance(s) in the Primera B Metropolitana play-offs)	0	31	6
Barracas Central	2017–18	Primera B Metropolitana	33	5	0	0	—		—		1	0	34	5
Barracas Central	2018–19	Primera B Metropolitana	20	2	1	0	—		—		0	0	21	2
Barracas Central	Total		83	13	1	0	—		—		2	0	86	13
Career total			265	31	8	1	—		2	0	3	0	278	32

== Honours ==
Huracán

- Copa Argentina: 2013–14

Barracas Central

- Primera B Metropolitana: 2018–19
