= Darío Cajaravilla =

Argentine footballer

Personal information
- Full name: Darío Cajaravilla
- Date of birth: 14 March 1980 (age 46)
- Place of birth: Mar del Plata, Argentina
- Height: 1.83 m (6 ft 0 in)
- Position: Defender

Senior career*
Years	Team	Apps	(Gls)
2001–2004	Aldosivi	37	(4)
2004	Colo-Colo	11	(1)
2005	All Boys	5	(0)
2005–2006	La Plata FC	24	(9)
2006–2014	Aldosivi	229	(16)
2014–2015	Tristán Suárez	17	(0)
2015–2016	San Martín Tucumán	27	(0)
2017–2018	Círculo Deportivo	–	(–)
- * Club domestic league appearances and goals

Darío Cajaravilla (born 14 March 1980) is an Argentine former footballer who played as a centre-back. He played for clubs including Colo-Colo and Aldosivi.

== Teams ==
- (Argentina) Aldosivi 2001–2004
- (Chile) Colo-Colo 2004
- (Argentina) All Boys 2005
- (Argentina) La Plata FC 2005–2006
- (Argentina) Aldosivi 2006–2014
- (Argentina) Tristán Suárez 2014–2015
- (Argentina) San Martín de Tucumán 2015–2016
- (Argentina) Círculo Deportivo 2017–2018
