= Franco Razzotti =

Argentine footballer (born 1985)

Personal information
- Full name: Franco Razzotti
- Date of birth: 6 February 1985 (age 41)
- Place of birth: Buenos Aires, Argentina
- Height: 1.80 m (5 ft 11 in)
- Position: Defensive midfielder

Team information
- Current team: Gualaceo SC

Youth career
- Vélez Sársfield

Senior career*
| Years | Team | Apps | (Gls) |
| 2005–2013 | Vélez Sársfield | 89 | (0) |
| 2008 | → Sporting Cristal (loan) | 45 | (1) |
| 2013 | → Independiente (loan) | 10 | (0) |
| 2014 | Vaslui | 10 | (0) |
| 2014 | Santa Fe | 2 | (0) |
| 2015 | Deportivo Municipal | 1 | (0) |
| 2016 | Defensores de Belgrano | 10 | (0) |
| 2016 | CRB | 1 | (0) |
| 2017– | Gualaceo SC | ? | (?) |

International career
| 2010 | Argentina | 1 | (0) |
- * Club domestic league appearances and goals as of 1 December 2017

Franco Razzotti (born 6 February 1985) is an Argentine footballer who plays as a midfielder for Gualaceo SC.

== Club career ==
Razzotti plays as a defensive midfielder. However, he started playing in Vélez' first team as a centre back under Ricardo La Volpe's coaching. After a brief loan in Peruvian Sporting Cristal, he returned to Vélez in 2009.

Under Ricardo Gareca's management, Razzotti established as a regular as the team's defensive midfielder, replacing injured Leandro Somoza. Razzotti played all 19 games in Vélez' 2009 Clausura championship winning season. The midfielder further played 11 games in his team's 2011 Clausura winning season, plus another 8 in the Copa Libertadores' semi-finalist campaign.

Razzotti then suffered an injury that left him out of the fields for one year and a half. He returned to the first team in the 2013 Final, playing 14 games. He also started in the team's 2012–13 Superfinal victory against Newell's Old Boys, earning his fourth league title with Vélez.

In 2014, Razzotti was loaned to Independiente, recently relegated to the Primera B Nacional. After losing his place in the starting eleven, he joined FC Vaslui in the Liga I.

== International career ==
Razzotti made his international debut for the Argentina national team on 26 January 2010 as a second-half substitute in a 3–2 win in a friendly match against Costa Rica. He was also an unused substitute in a friendly 4–1 victory over Venezuela on March 16, 2011.

== Honours ==
Vélez Sársfield

- Argentine Primera División (4): 2009 Clausura, 2011 Clausura, 2012 Inicial, 2012–13 Superfinal
