= Diego Calgaro =

Argentine footballer

Personal information
- Full name: Diego Agustín Calgaro
- Date of birth: November 27, 1984 (age 41)
- Place of birth: Posadas, Argentina
- Height: 1.86 m (6 ft 1 in)
- Position: Defensive midfielder

Team information
- Current team: Crucero del Norte

Senior career*
Years	Team	Apps	(Gls)
2004–2008	Rosario Central	63	(0)
2008–2009	Trenčín	12	(0)
2009–2010	Unión	26	(1)
2010–2011	Tiro Federal	2	(0)
2011–2012	Desamparados	31	(0)
2012–2013	Tucumán	13	(0)
2013–	Crucero del Norte	28	(1)
- * Club domestic league appearances and goals as of 01:50, 23 September 2013 (UTC)

Diego Agustín Calgaro (born November 27, 1984, in Posadas) is an Argentine football midfielder currently playing for Crucero del Norte of the Argentine second division.
