= Sergio Escudero (footballer, born 1983) =

Argentine footballer

Personal information
- Full name: Sergio Daniel Escudero
- Date of birth: April 12, 1983 (age 43)
- Place of birth: Punta Alta, Argentina
- Height: 1.94 m (6 ft 4 in)
- Position: Defender

Senior career*
Years	Team	Apps	(Gls)
2003	Racing de Olavarría	12	(0)
2004	Alvarado	23	(2)
2005–2006	Olimpo	32	(2)
2007	Independiente	7	(0)
2007–2008	Argentinos Juniors	42	(1)
2009–2010	Corinthians	22	(1)
2010	→ Argentinos Juniors (loan)	17	(0)
2011–2012	Argentinos Juniors	25	(0)
2012–2014	Coritiba	28	(0)
2014	→ Criciúma (loan)	20	(1)
2014–2015	Independiente	3	(0)
2015	Belgrano	13	(3)
2016–2017	Quilmes	5	(0)
2017–2018	Argentino de Quilmes	13	(0)
2018	Deportivo Español	9	(0)
- * Club domestic league appearances and goals as of 14:43, 14 October 2019 (UTC)

Sergio Daniel Escudero (born 12 April 1983 in Punta Alta, Buenos Aires) is an Argentine football defender.

== Career ==
Escudero started his career in 2003 playing for Racing de Olavarría in the regionalised 4th division of Argentine football. In 2004, he joined Alvarado de Mar del Plata in the same league.

In 2005 Escudero was signed by Olimpo de Bahía Blanca of the Argentine Primera. The club were relegated at the end of the 2005–2006 season after losing a playoff with Club Atlético Belgrano.

Escudero stayed with Olimpo and helped the club to win the Apertura 2006 tournament, setting them on their way towards promotion back to the Primera. In 2007, he was signed by Independiente, but he only played 7 league games for the club before moving on to join Argentinos Juniors.

On 22 December 2008 left Argentinos Juniors for 1,4 million euros for the co-ownership, to Corinthians. After several weak performances, he returned to Argentinos in June 2010.

== Honours ==
Olimpo de Bahía Blanca

- Primera B Nacional: Apertura 2006

Coritiba

- Campeonato Paranaense: 2013
