= Federico Mancuello =

Argentine footballer (born 1989)

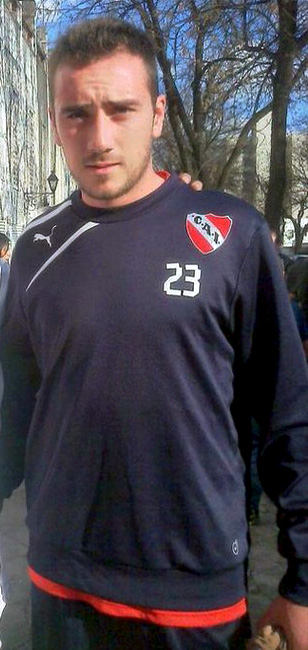
- Mancuello at Independiente.

Personal information
- Full name: Federico Andrés Mancuello
- Date of birth: 26 March 1989 (age 37)
- Place of birth: Reconquista, Argentina
- Height: 1.75 m (5 ft 9 in)
- Position: Central midfielder

Team information
- Current team: Argentinos Juniors

Youth career
- 2004–2008: Independiente

Senior career*
Years	Team	Apps	(Gls)
2008–2015	Independiente	152	(20)
2011–2012	→ Belgrano (loan)	21	(1)
2016–2017	Flamengo	29	(5)
2018	Cruzeiro	20	(1)
2019–2021	Toluca	27	(2)
2020–2021	→ Vélez Sarsfield (loan)	25	(2)
2022–2023	Puebla	58	(6)
2023–2026	Independiente	59	(3)
2026–	Argentinos Juniors	0	(0)

International career
2015	Argentina	2	(1)
- * Club domestic league appearances and goals as of 16:28, 2 August 2026 (UTC)

Federico Andrés Mancuello (born 26 March 1989) is an Argentine professional footballer who plays as central midfielder for Argentine Primera División club Argentinos Juniors. Mancuello started his career at Independiente and had a brief loan at Belgrano during 2011–12 season. He moved to Flamengo at the beginning of the 2016 season. He also represented Argentina on two occasions scoring one goal.

== Club career ==
=== Early years ===
Mancuello made his league debut for Independiente in a 1–2 home defeat by Arsenal de Sarandí on 14 December 2008. He scored his first goal for the club in a 5–1 away defeat to Lanús on 5 April 2009. He scored again on 11 April in a 2–1 win over Huracán.

=== Loan to Belgrano ===
After not being considered by Independiente's coach Antonio Mohamed in July 2011 Mancuello was loaned to Club Atlético Belgrano for one year. On 26 October he scored his first and only goal in a 1–0 victory against Tigre. In January 2012 Mancuello suffered an injury in a match of the Copa Argentina which kept him out of the fields for several weeks when he was being a key player of his team.

=== Return to Independiente ===
For the 2012 Torneo Clausura, Mancuello returned to Independiente. His only goal that season came in a 2–1 victory against Liverpool in Uruguay, where he scored the equaliser. However, the club was relegated for the first time in his first season back.

Independiente were soon promoted back to the Primera División after only one season in the Nacional B where they finished third and Mancuello scored two goals. On 31 August 2014, Independiente faced their rivals Racing Club, but Mancuello scored to help Independiente to a 2–1 victory, saying it was "the most important goal of my career". After scoring 10 goals in 19 games in the 2014 season, Argentina manager Gerardo Martino stated that he would keep Mancuello in mind for future call-ups.

=== Flamengo ===
==== 2016 season ====
On January 6, 2016, Mancuello was signed by Brazilian club Flamengo for a fee of R$12 million. In the first half of the season Mancuello didn't perform as expected due to some injuries, playing all of his 12 matches as a starter and scoring 3 goals. As the 2016 Série A started he lost his status of starter, but established himself as of the most important substitutes of the team.

On 6 August 2016 Mancuello scored his first Série A goal in a 1–0 win against Atlético Paranaense in Kléber Andrade Stadium, the game-winner goal was scored in a beautiful back heel flick. On 28 August 2016, against Chapecoense, he substituted Éverton on the 62nd minute and scored his second Série A in the injury time, Flamengo won the match 3–1 at Arena Condá. His third Série A goal was, once again, a game-winner, this time against Cruzeiro in a beautiful placed shot in the 87th minute. In his first season at Flamengo, Mancuello made 36 appearances and scored five goals in all competitions.

== International career ==
On March 20, 2015, Mancuello was called up by Argentine coach Gerardo Martino for the friendly matches against El Salvador on March 28 and Ecuador on March 31, 2015. He made his debut against El Salvador at Fedex Field, replacing Ángel Di María in the second half and scoring a debut goal from a free kick at the end of the match. In May, he was selected for the preliminary squad for the 2015 Copa América but he wasn't considered for the definitive draft.

== Career statistics ==
=== Club career ===
As of 5 December 2018

Club	Season	League			Cup		Continental		Other		Total	
Club	Season	Division	Apps	Goals	Apps	Goals	Apps	Goals	Apps	Goals	Apps	Goals
Independiente	2008–09	Primera División	16	3	–		–		–		16	3
Independiente	2009–10	Primera División	18	1	–		–		–		18	1
Independiente	2010–11	Primera División	15	1	–		4	0	–		19	1
Independiente	Total		59	5	–		4	0	–		63	5
Belgrano	2011–12	Primera División	21	1	1	0	–		–		22	1
Belgrano	Total		21	1	1	0	–		–		22	1
Independiente	2012–13	Primera División	21	0	0	0	3	1	–		24	1
Independiente	2013–14	Primera B Nacional	37	2	2	0	–		–		39	2
Independiente	2014	Primera División	19	10	0	0	–		–		19	10
Independiente	2015	Primera División	16	3	0	0	2	0	–		18	3
Independiente	Total		93	15	2	0	5	1	–		100	16
Flamengo	2016	Série A	21	3	3	1	3	0	9	1	36	5
Flamengo	2017	Série A	8	2	1	0	6	0	15	3	30	5
Flamengo	Total		29	5	4	1	9	0	24	4	66	10
Cruzeiro	2018	Série A	20	1	2	0	4	0	12	2	38	3
Cruzeiro	Total		20	1	2	0	4	0	12	2	38	3
Career total			222	27	6	1	22	1	36	6	286	39

=== International career ===
#	Date	Venue	Opponent	Final score	Goal	Result	Competition	Ref
1.	28 March 2015	Fedex Field, Landover, Maryland, USA	El Salvador	2–0	1	Win	Friendly	
2.	31 March 2015	MetLife Stadium, East Rutherford, New Jersey, USA	Ecuador	2–1	0	Win	Friendly	

== Honours ==
Independiente

- Copa Sudamericana: 2010

Flamengo

- Campeonato Carioca: 2017

Cruzeiro

- Copa do Brasil: 2018
- Campeonato Mineiro: 2018
