= Marcelo Berza =

Argentine football defender

Personal information
- Full name: Marcelo Fabian Berza
- Date of birth: July 28, 1975 (age 51)
- Place of birth: San Juan, Argentina
- Height: 1.85 m (6 ft 1 in)
- Position: Defender

Team information
- Current team: Gimnasia de Jujuy

Senior career*
Years	Team	Apps	(Gls)
1993–1996	Almirante Brown	45	(0)
1996–1999	Banfield	47	(1)
1999–2000	Federal	0	(0)
2000–2002	San Martín de San Juan	62	(5)
2002–2003	Godoy Cruz	33	(0)
2003–2007	Gimnasia de Jujuy	93	(3)
2008–2009	Belgrano	50	(2)
2009–2011	San Martín de Tucumán	21	(0)
2011–2013	Ferro Carril Oeste	63	(1)
2013–	Gimnasia de Jujuy	28	(1)
- * Club domestic league appearances and goals as of 23 March 2015

Marcelo Fabian Berza (born 28 July 1975) is an Argentine football defender. He currently plays for Gimnasia y Esgrima de Jujuy in the Primera B Nacional.

Berza was born in San Juan. He started his career in 1993 with Almirante Brown before moving to Banfield of the Argentine Primera in 1996. Banfield were relegated in 1997 but Berza stayed with the club.

In 1999 Berza played with Federal in Honduras before returning to Argentina in 2000 to play for his local team; San Martín de San Juan.

Between 2002 and 2003 Berza spent a season with Godoy Cruz in Mendoza before joining Gimnasia de Jujuy. In 2005 Berza was part of the squad that won the 2nd division Clausura championship and obtained promotion to the Primera.

== Titles ==
Season	Team	Title
Clausura 2005	Gimnasia y Esgrima de Jujuy	Primera B Nacional
