= Gabriel Vallés =

Argentine footballer

Personal information
- Full name: Gabriel Gustavo Vallés
- Date of birth: 31 May 1986 (age 40)
- Place of birth: Godoy Cruz, Argentina
- Height: 1.69 m (5 ft 6 1/2 in)
- Position: Right back

Youth career
- Godoy Cruz

Senior career*
Years	Team	Apps	(Gls)
2005–2010	Godoy Cruz	111	(1)
- * Club domestic league appearances and goals as of 25 May 2015

Gabriel Gustavo Vallés (born 31 May 1986) is an Argentine football player.

== Career ==
His debut in the Argentine First Division was in 2006 against Gimnasia y Esgrima de Jujuy playing for Godoy Cruz de Mendoza.

He was part of the winning squad that won the Copa Sudamericana 2010 with Independiente de Avellaneda.

== Honors ==
Independiente

- Copa Sudamericana: 2010
