= Pablo Lunati =

Argentine former football referee (born 1967)

- Full name: Pablo Alejandro Lunati
- Born: 5 June 1967 (age 59); Buenos Aires, Argentina

Domestic
Years	League	Role

International
Years	League	Role
2007–	FIFA listed	Referee

Pablo Alejandro Lunati (born 5 June 1967) is an Argentine former football referee. He refereed 2010 and 2014 FIFA World Cup qualifiers.

After retirement, Lunati confirmed he was a supporter of River Plate; revealing a tattoo of their manager Marcelo Gallardo in the process. Lunati also claimed he had favoured River when refereeing them.
