= Reinaldo Alderete =

Argentine footballer (born 1983)

Personal information
- Full name: Reinaldo Andrés Alderete
- Date of birth: January 17, 1983 (age 43)
- Place of birth: Santa Fe, Argentina
- Height: 1.77 m (5 ft 10 in)
- Position: Defensive midfielder

Team information
- Current team: Agropecuario

Youth career
- Gimnasia LP

Senior career*
Years	Team	Apps	(Gls)
2003–2009	Gimnasia LP	54	(1)
2009–2010	Maccabi Petah Tikva	3	(0)
2010–2011	San Martín SJ	33	(1)
2011–2012	Rosario Central	24	(0)
2012–2013	→ San Martín SJ (loan)	33	(0)
2013–2014	Independiente	11	(0)
2014–2017	Ferro Carril Oeste	98	(3)
2017–2019	Agropecuario	32	(0)
2019–2020	Atlético Rafaela	12	(1)
2020–2021	Sportivo Belgrano	11	(0)
2022–	Agropecuario	2	(0)
- * Club domestic league appearances and goals as of 18:53, 15 June 2022 (UTC)

Reinaldo Andrés Alderete (born 17 January 1983) is an Argentine football midfielder playing for Agropecuario in the Primera Nacional.

== Career ==
For the 2010–11 season, Alderete joined San Martín de San Juan.
