= Cristian Menéndez =

Argentine footballer

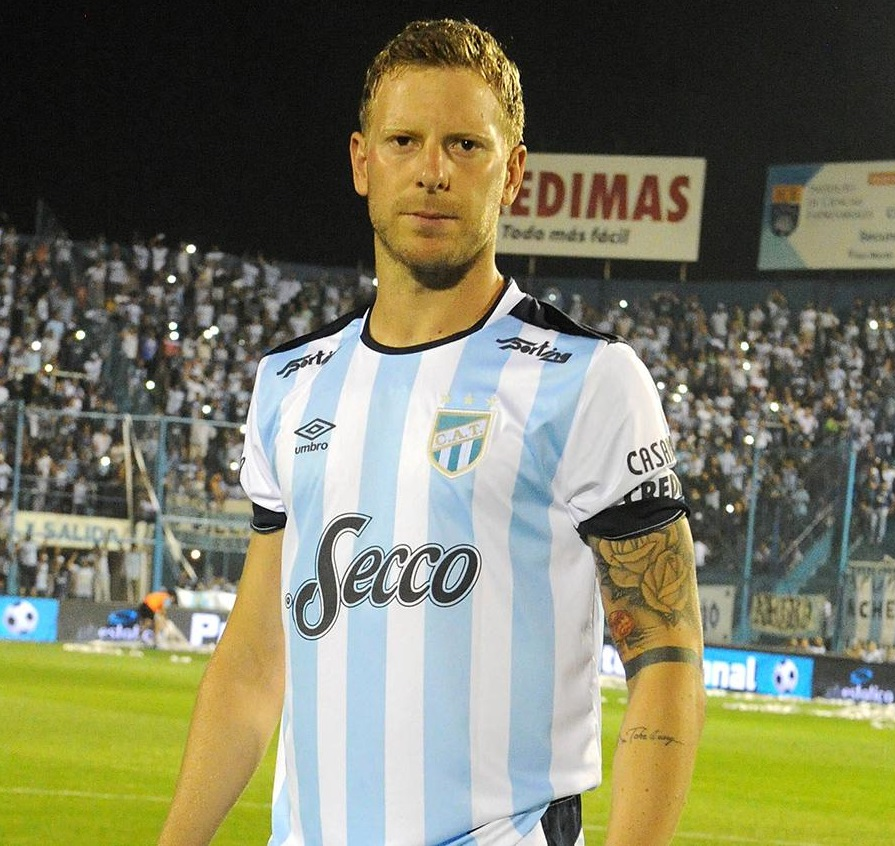

Personal information
- Full name: Cristian Matías Menéndez
- Date of birth: 2 April 1988 (age 38)
- Place of birth: Mar del Plata, Argentina
- Height: 1.86 m (6 ft 1 in)
- Position: Forward

Team information
- Current team: Gimnasia Jujuy

Youth career
- 2004–2007: Lanús

Senior career*
| Years | Team | Apps | (Gls) |
| 2007–2014 | Lanús | 40 | (3) |
| 2010–2011 | → Emelec (loan) | 36 | (12) |
| 2011–2012 | → Libertad (loan) | 32 | (9) |
| 2013 | → Quilmes (loan) | 13 | (2) |
| 2013–2014 | → Independiente (loan) | 19 | (1) |
| 2014–2017 | Tucumán | 92 | (30) |
| 2017–2019 | Veracruz | 67 | (15) |
| 2020 | Puebla | 7 | (2) |
| 2020–2021 | Everton | 16 | (2) |
| 2021–2024 | Atlético Tucumán | 73 | (8) |
| 2024– | Gimnasia Jujuy | 73 | (12) |
- * Club domestic league appearances and goals as of 17:37, 28 April 2026 (UTC)

Cristian Matías Menéndez (Latin American Spanish: [kɾiˈstjam maˈti.as meˈnendes], born 2 April 1988) is an Argentine professional footballer who plays for Gimnasia Jujuy.

== Club career ==
=== Lanús ===
Menéndez began playing in 2007 for Lanús. He made his debut in a remarkable 2–6 home defeat to Arsenal de Sarandí on 2 May 2008. His first goal for the club came on 14 March 2009 in a 2–1 home win against Colón. In 2009, he gained his first experiences of international club football featuring in 2 Copa Libertadores 2009 and 2 Copa Sudamericana 2009 games.

=== Emelec ===
On 5 June 2010 left Club Atlético Lanús and joined on loan with sold option to Club Sport Emelec. While there, he tweeted a racist and insulting comment regarding Ecuatorians (and Bolivians as well); his loan was canceled and he had to leave Ecuador.

=== Libertad ===
In 2011, he was loaned to Libertad of Paraguay.

== Honours ==
Lanús

- Torneo de Apertura: 2007

Emelec

- Ecuadorian Serie A: Runner–up 2010
