= Lucas Oviedo =

Argentine footballer (born 1985)

Personal information
- Full name: Lucas Matías Oviedo
- Date of birth: April 19, 1985 (age 41)
- Place of birth: Tucumán, Argentina
- Height: 1.75 m (5 ft 9 in)
- Position: Right winger

Team information
- Current team: Sarmiento Resistencia

Senior career*
Years	Team	Apps	(Gls)
2002–2008	San Martín Tucumán	110	(5)
2008–2010	Tigre	23	(0)
2010–2011	San Martín Tucumán	4	(0)
2011–2012	San Martín SJ	5	(0)
2012–2013	Sarmiento	34	(6)
2013–2015	Boca Unidos	73	(3)
2016–2017	Brown de Adrogué	53	(4)
2017–2018	Crucero del Norte	34	(1)
2019	Estudiantes Río Cuarto	7	(0)
2019–	Sarmiento Resistencia	2	(0)
- * Club domestic league appearances and goals as of 00:08, 16 September 2019 (UTC)

Lucas Matías Oviedo (born 19 April 1985) is an Argentine football midfielder who plays for Sarmiento Resistencia.

== Career ==
Oviedo began his playing career with San Martín de Tucumán in the regionalised 4th division of Argentine football in 2002. He won several promotions with the club, eventually helping the side to win the 2nd division championship and gain automatic promotion to the Primera División at the end of the 2007-08 season.

Following this success Oviedo was signed by Primera División side Club Atlético Tigre in 2008. Two years later, he returned to San Martín.

== Honours ==
Season	Team	Title
2007-08	San Martín de Tucumán	Primera B Nacional
