= Samuel Cáceres =

Paraguayan footballer (born 1989)

Personal information
- Full name: Samuel Catalino Cáceres Arza
- Date of birth: 20 March 1989 (age 37)
- Place of birth: Asunción, Paraguay
- Height: 1.88 m (6 ft 2 in)
- Position: Centre back

Team information
- Current team: New York Renegades

Youth career
- Independiente

Senior career*
Years	Team	Apps	(Gls)
2009–2016	Independiente	20	(4)
2012–2014	→ Nueva Chicago (loan)	20	(2)
2015–2016	→ New York Cosmos (loan)	12	(0)
2017	Johor Darul Ta'zim II		
2018	Deportivo Pasto	1	(0)
2019	Deportivo Capiatá	8	(1)
2019–2021	Nacional	1	(0)
2021	Portuguesa	18	(3)
2022	Valley United	7	(0)
2023–	New York Renegades		
- * Club domestic league appearances and goals as of 14 October 2026

Samuel Cáceres (born 20 March 1989) is a Paraguayan professional footballer who plays for the New York Renegades in the United Premier Soccer League as a centre back.

== Career ==
Cáceres began his career playing for the club "Real Luján" in Argentina. In 2006, he traveled to Portugal to play for Benfica. But having no passport had he was forced to return to Argentina and began playing for Atlético Independiente.

Cáceres made his professional debut with Independiente in 2009 for the reserve team. Spending his entire career with Independiente and Nueva Chicago, Caceres is on loan to the New York Cosmos.

In 2023, Cáceres played for the Hicksville-based New York Renegades FC in the United Premier Soccer League, also featuring for the team in their 2024 U.S. Open Cup qualifiers. In 2026, he helped the team win the Fall 2025 UPSL National Championship and helped the team reach the national finals once again in the Spring 2026 season.

== Teams ==
- Independiente 2009–2012
- Nueva Chicago 2012 and 2014
- Independiente 2012–2014
- New York Cosmos 2015–2016
- JDT II 2017

== Titles ==
- Independiente 2010 Copa Sudamericana
