= Patricio Vidal (Argentine footballer) =

Argentine footballer

Personal information
- Full name: Patricio Elías Vidal
- Date of birth: 8 April 1992 (age 34)
- Place of birth: San Miguel de Tucumán, Argentina
- Height: 1.81 m (5 ft 11 in)
- Position: Forward

Team information
- Current team: Atlético Vinotinto
- Number: 16

Youth career
- Independiente

Senior career*
Years	Team	Apps	(Gls)
2011–2016	Independiente	26	(2)
2013–2014	→ Unión Española (loan)	24	(3)
2015–2016	→ Unión La Calera (loan)	39	(11)
2016–2018	Sarmiento	26	(4)
2018	Oriente Petrolero	21	(3)
2019–2020	Alvarado	9	(0)
2020	Olmedo	6	(0)
2021–	Brown de Adrogué	11	(3)
- * Club domestic league appearances and goals as of 15:32, 15 August 2021 (UTC)

Patricio Elías Vidal (born 8 April 1992 in San Miguel de Tucumán) is an Argentine football forward who plays for Atlético Vinotinto.
