= Enrique Seccafien =

Argentine footballer

Personal information
- Full name: Mariano Enrique Seccafien
- Date of birth: June 23, 1984 (age 42)
- Place of birth: Morón, Argentina
- Height: 1.75 m (5 ft 9 in)
- Position: Midfielder

Team information
- Current team: Los Andes

Senior career*
Years	Team	Apps	(Gls)
2002–2006	Deportivo Morón		
2006–2007	Tiburones Rojos		
2007	Rosario Central	3	(0)
2008	Tiburones Rojos		
2008	Veracruz		
2009	Deportivo Morón		
2009–2010	Deportivo Merlo	31	(2)
2010–2016	Aldosivi	174	(16)
2016–	Los Andes	0	(0)
- * Club domestic league appearances and goals as of 30 December 2015

Mariano Enrique Seccafien (born 23 June 1984) is an Argentine football midfielder who plays for Los Andes in Argentina.

== Career ==
Seccafien played for Deportivo Morón, where he debuted as a footballer, from 2002 to 2006. Then he emigrated to Mexico to play in Tiburones Rojos de Coatzacoalcos from 2006 to 2007. Subsequently, he returned to Argentina to play in Rosario Central, returning to Deportivo Morón in 2010.
