= Lihué Prichoda =

Argentine footballer

Personal information
- Full name: Lihué Darío Prichoda
- Date of birth: 28 June 1989 (age 37)
- Place of birth: Buenos Aires, Argentina
- Height: 1.78 m (5 ft 10 in)
- Position: Midfielder

Team information
- Current team: Juventud Antoniana

Youth career
- 2001–2007: Racing Club

Senior career*
Years	Team	Apps	(Gls)
2008–2011	Racing Club	18	(0)
2009–2010	→ San Martín (loan)	24	(2)
2010–2011	→ Tiro Federal (loan)	23	(3)
2011–2013	Unión San Felipe	27	(3)
2012–2013	→ Banfield (loan)	27	(2)
2013–2017	Banfield	27	(3)
2014–2015	→ Colón (loan)	5	(0)
2015–2016	→ Nueva Chicago (loan)	10	(0)
2017–2018	Gimnasia de Jujuy	15	(0)
2018–2019	Deportivo Madryn	23	(2)
2019	Argentino de Quilmes	10	(1)
2020	Academia Puerto Cabello	3	(0)
2021–2022	Cibao FC	44	(2)
2023	Real Juventud		
2024–	Juventud Antoniana	0	(0)
- * Club domestic league appearances and goals as of 20:14, 27 February 2024 (UTC)

Lihué Darío Prichoda (born 28 June 1989) is an Argentine professional footballer who plays as a midfielder for Torneo Federal A side Juventud Antoniana.

== Club career ==
=== Racing Club ===
Prichoda began his playing career in 2008 with Racing Club, he made his debut on 10 August 2008 in a 0–2 home defeat to Lanús. After making 18 appearances for Racing he joined 2nd division side San Martín de Tucumán in 2009 as a lending operation. His sporting rights are property of Racing Club. Now he is a member of the professional team of Tiro Federal, a popular club from Ludueña neighborhood in Rosario City.
