= Mariano Guerreiro =

Argentine footballer

Personal information
- Full name: Mariano Guerreiro
- Date of birth: 20 January 1993 (age 33)
- Place of birth: La Carlota, Argentina
- Height: 1.83 m (6 ft 0 in)
- Position: Centre forward

Team information
- Current team: UAI Urquiza

Youth career
- –2012: Argentinos Juniors

Senior career*
Years	Team	Apps	(Gls)
2012–2016	Argentinos Juniors	10	(0)
2013–2014	→ Brown de Adrogué (loan)	36	(14)
2015	→ Instituto ACC (loan)	25	(3)
2016	→ Defensa y Justicia	1	(0)
2016–2017	Blooming	28	(4)
2017–2018	Guillermo Brown	19	(2)
2018–2019	Deportivo Santamarina	4	(0)
2019–	UAI Urquiza	12	(1)
- * Club domestic league appearances and goals as of 15 April 2019

Mariano Guerreiro (born 20 January 1993) is an Argentine footballer who plays as a centre forward for UAI Urquiza.
