= Sebastián Penco =

Argentine footballer

Personal information
- Full name: Sebastián Ariel Penco
- Date of birth: 22 September 1983 (age 43)
- Place of birth: Morón, Argentina
- Height: 1.83 m (6 ft 0 in)
- Position: Forward

Senior career*
Years	Team	Apps	(Gls)
2002–2004	Deportivo Español	43	(24)
2004–2005	Racing Club	6	(0)
2005	Nueva Chicago	14	(1)
2006	Deportivo Español	10	(2)
2006	Almagro	15	(3)
2007	Almirante Brown	41	(19)
2008	Skoda Xanthi	9	(1)
2009	Everton	13	(1)
2009–2013	San Martín SJ	43	(18)
2013–2015	Independiente	36	(10)
2015–2016	Once Caldas	23	(4)
2016–2017	Aldosivi	36	(9)
2017	Atlético San Luis	15	(3)
2018	Murciélagos	13	(2)
2018–2019	Almirante Brown	16	(1)
2019	Sarmiento	9	(0)
2019–2021	Sport Boys	55	(26)
2022	San Martín SJ	31	(5)
2023	Nuova Florida	–	(–)
- * Club domestic league appearances and goals as of 8 January 2024

Sebastián Ariel Penco (born 22 September 1983 in Morón, Buenos Aires) is an Argentine footballer who plays as a forward. He last played for Serie D side Nuova Florida.

== Career ==
He has had successful stints with San Martín de San Juan and Independiente in his homeland and Sport Boys in Peru.

In 2023, he played for Serie D side Nuova Florida Calcio.

== Personal life ==
He is nicknamed Motoneta (Scooter) due to the fact that he uses to celebrate his goals simulating a motorcycle.
