= Daniel Montenegro =

Argentine footballer

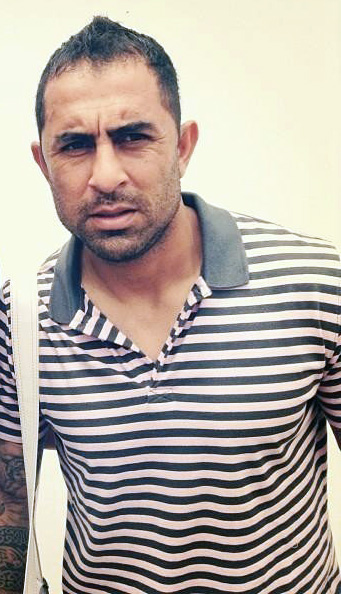
- Montenegro in 2015

Personal information
- Full name: Daniel Gastón Montenegro Casella
- Date of birth: 28 March 1979 (age 47)
- Place of birth: Buenos Aires, Argentina
- Height: 1.72 m (5 ft 8 in)
- Position: Attacking midfielder

Youth career
- Huracán

Senior career*
Years	Team	Apps	(Gls)
1997–1999	Huracán	79	(19)
1999	Independiente	19	(7)
2000–2002	Marseille	6	(1)
2000–2001	→ Zaragoza (loan)	28	(2)
2001–2002	→ Osasuna (loan)	10	(0)
2002	→ Huracán (loan)	18	(11)
2002–2003	Independiente	37	(7)
2003–2004	River Plate	30	(5)
2004–2005	Saturn	24	(2)
2005–2006	River Plate	29	(6)
2006–2009	Independiente	104	(41)
2009–2012	América	128	(23)
2013–2014	Independiente	77	(14)
2015–2018	Huracán	68	(5)
Total		657	(143)

International career
1999	Argentina U20	4	(0)
2007–2009	Argentina	3	(0)
- * Club domestic league appearances and goals

Daniel Gastón Montenegro Casella (born 28 March 1979) is an Argentine former professional footballer who played mainly as an attacking midfielder.

He spent most of his career with Huracán and Independiente, having several spells with both clubs over 21 years. He appeared three times for Argentina in the late 2000s.

== Club career ==
Born in Buenos Aires, Montenegro began his professional career at Club Atlético Huracán in 1997. He subsequently signed for Club Atlético Independiente, going on to represent the club on three different spells and teaming up with sibling Ariel in the first.

In the 1999 January transfer window, Montenegro moved to France with Olympique de Marseille, being loaned several times by the Ligue 1 side for the duration of his contract, mostly to teams in Spain (Real Zaragoza – where he contributed four matches to their conquest of the Copa del Rey – and CA Osasuna, both in La Liga). He then played in quick succession for Independiente and Club Atlético River Plate, before spending parts of two seasons in the Russian Premier League with FC Saturn Ramenskoye.

Montenegro returned to his main club for the 2006–07 season, going on to often act as captain and scoring in double digits in three of his first four years, including a career-best 15 goals in 2008–09. He moved abroad again in 2009, signing with Mexico's Club América for $3.5 million after lengthy negotiations. He made his Liga MX debut for his new team on 2 August, in a 1–2 home loss to Monarcas Morelia. Late in the same month, he scored from his own half in a 7–2 rout of Toluca FC also at the Estadio Azteca.

On 22 December 2012, free agent Montenegro rejoined Independiente for a fourth spell, agreeing to a one-and-a-half-year contract. In early 2015, he was ousted from the squad after a run-in with manager Jorge Almirón and forced to train alone.

Aged 36, Montenegro returned to Huracán after 13 years having rejected an offer from Club Atlético Nueva Chicago. He remained on the bench for the final of the Supercopa Argentina, won against Club Atlético River Plate shortly after his arrival.

At the end of the 2017–18 campaign, in which he helped the Parque Patricios-based side qualify for the Copa Libertadores after a fourth-place league finish, Montenegro announced his retirement.

== International career ==
Montenegro represented the Argentina under-20 team at the 1999 FIFA World Youth Championship, and made his debut with the full side on 18 April 2007, against Chile. He won the second of his three caps on 1 April 2009, appearing as a late substitute in the Albiceleste's 6–1 defeat in Bolivia for the 2010 FIFA World Cup qualifiers.

== Personal life ==
Montenegro's older brother, Ariel, was also a footballer and a midfielder. They shared teams at Independiente, and he spent most of his career in Spain.

== Honours ==
Zaragoza

- Copa del Rey: 2000–01

Independiente

- Argentine Primera División: Apertura 2002

River Plate

- Argentine Primera División: Clausura 2004

Huracán

- Supercopa Argentina: 2014
