= Federico Insúa =

Argentine footballer

Personal information
- Full name: Federico Insúa
- Date of birth: January 3, 1980 (age 46)
- Place of birth: Buenos Aires, Argentina
- Height: 1.81 m (5 ft 11 in)
- Position: Attacking midfielder

Senior career*
| Years | Team | Apps | (Gls) |
| 1997–2002 | Argentinos Juniors | 114 | (16) |
| 2002–2003 | Independiente | 56 | (14) |
| 2003–2004 | Málaga | 31 | (3) |
| 2004–2005 | Independiente | 35 | (9) |
| 2005–2006 | Boca Juniors | 37 | (11) |
| 2006–2007 | Borussia M'gladbach | 32 | (2) |
| 2007–2010 | Club América | 30 | (5) |
| 2009 | → Necaxa (loan) | 16 | (2) |
| 2009–2010 | → Boca Juniors (loan) | 30 | (3) |
| 2010–2012 | Bursaspor | 24 | (1) |
| 2012–2014 | Vélez Sarsfield | 62 | (9) |
| 2014–2015 | Independiente | 18 | (2) |
| 2015 | Millonarios | 41 | (10) |
| 2016 | Argentinos Juniors | 14 | (1) |

International career
| 2003–2010 | Argentina | 14 | (0) |

Managerial career
- 2021: Aldosivi (Assistant)
- 2021–2023: Racing Club (Assistant)
- 2024: Guadalajara (Assistant)
- * Club domestic league appearances and goals as of 1 January 2016

Federico Insúa (born January 3, 1980) is an Argentine retired footballer who played 14 times for the Argentina national team. Usually a playmaker, he is well known for his vision and technique.

== Club career ==
=== Early years ===
Nicknamed El Pocho, Insúa grew up in a middle-class family in Buenos Aires. He moved to the youth teams of Argentinos Juniors from the Club Parque youth team, and debuted professionally on November 18, 1997. After five seasons with the club, he transferred to Independiente in 2002. After winning a local championship with Independiente, he moved to Spanish first division Málaga CF in 2003, but after only one unsuccessful season he returned to Independiente.

=== Boca Juniors ===
At the beginning of the 2005–06 season, Insúa again transferred, this time to Boca Juniors. He debuted for Boca in a 4–1 victory over Gimnasia de Jujuy. Even though he had a slow start, he succeeded in becoming Boca's playmaker, helping the team to win two league titles and two international cups by the end of 2006.

=== Germany and Mexico ===
On July 28, 2006, Insúa transferred for €4 million to German Bundesliga side Borussia Mönchengladbach, which hoped to fill a gap in its offensive midfield. The 26-year-old midfielder put pen to paper on a four-year deal. The Argentine international wore the number 10 shirt for Borussia. On February 3, 2007, he scored his first Bundesliga goal in a game against Arminia Bielefeld.

After the relegation of Borussia in the 2006–07 Bundesliga, he was sold to Club América (Mexico) for US$7.5 million, for four years, with a salary of US$1,875,000 a year. He joined the squad on June 27, 2007. On July 27, 2008, Insúa opened the 1–0 score against Santos Laguna on the first match of the Apertua 2008 season. In early January 2009 he was loaned to Necaxa, but he could not help the team avoid relegation.

On July 18, 2009, Insúa was loaned to Boca Juniors for one year. Once the loan finished, he signed with Bursaspor to a two-year deal on June 17, 2010.

=== Return to Argentina ===
Insúa returned to Argentina for the 2012 Clausura, joining Vélez Sársfield. With Vélez he obtained his fourth Argentine league title (with three different teams) after helping his team to win the 2012 Inicial, starting all 19 games and scoring once. He also won with Vélez the 2012–13 Superfinal and helped the team to a semi-finalist campaign in the 2013 Copa Sudamericana.

In January 2014, the attacking midfielder returned to Independiente when the team was playing in the Primera B Nacional. He signed an 18-month contract with the club. He played few matches in the tournament mostly as a substitute and the team was promoted back to the first division at the end of the season. He couldn't gain a single minute of play with new manager Jorge Almirón and in October 2014 he was fired by president Hugo Moyano.

=== Millonarios ===
At the end of 2014 Insúa was hired by Colombian team Millonarios to start playing in the 2015 Categoría Primera A season.

== International career ==
Insúa debuted for the Argentina national football team in January 2003 and played for them on a sporadic basis over the following years.

== National team statistics ==
Argentina national team
| Year | Apps | Goals |
|---|---|---|
| 2003 | 4 | 0 |
| 2004 | 1 | 0 |
| 2005 | 1 | 0 |
| 2006 | 2 | 0 |
| 2007 | 2 | 0 |
| 2008 | 0 | 0 |
| 2009 | 2 | 0 |
| 2010 | 2 | 0 |
| Total | 14 | 0 |

== Honours ==
Independiente

- Argentine Primera División (1): 2002 Apertura

Boca Juniors

- Argentine Primera División (2): 2005 Apertura, 2006 Clausura
- Copa Sudamericana (1): 2005
- Recopa Sudamericana (1): 2005

Vélez Sársfield

- Argentine Primera División (2): 2012 Inicial, 2012–13 Superfinal
