= Cristian Tula =

Argentine footballer

Personal information
- Full name: Cristian Alberto Tula
- Date of birth: January 28, 1978 (age 48)
- Place of birth: Rawson, Argentina
- Height: 1.76 m (5 ft 9 in)
- Positions: Centre back; right back

Youth career
- Ferro Carril Oeste

Senior career*
Years	Team	Apps	(Gls)
1999–2003	Ferro Carril Oeste	114	(12)
2003–2005	River Plate	12	(0)
2005	Arsenal de Sarandí	15	(0)
2006	River Plate	8	(1)
2006–2012	San Lorenzo	120	(13)
2009–2010	→ Arsenal de Sarandí (loan)	35	(1)
2012	Atlético Nacional	17	(1)
2012–2015	Independiente	69	(4)
- * Club domestic league appearances and goals as of 25 May 2015

Cristian Alberto Tula (born 28 January 1978) is an Argentine football defender who last played for Independiente in the Argentine Primera División.

== Career ==
Tula started his career with Ferro Carril Oeste in 1998 but in 2000 the club were relegated from the Primera, and the season after they were relegated again to the 3rd division. In 2003 they won the 3rd division title and Tula was signed by Argentine giants River Plate. In 2004, he was part of the River Plate squad that won the Clausura title.

In 2005 Tula had a loan spell with Arsenal de Sarandí before returning to River. In 2006 River sold Tula to San Lorenzo de Almagro where he has established himself as a first team regular. After a season on loan back at Arsenal, Tula returned to San Lorenzo for the 2010–11 season.

== Honours ==
Season	Club	Title
2002–2003	Ferro Carril Oeste	Primera B Metropolitana
Clausura 2004	River Plate	Primera Division Argentina
Clausura 2007	San Lorenzo	Primera Division Argentina
