= 2011–12 Club Atlético Independiente season =

Independiente
2011–12 season
- President: Julio Comparada (Until 31 December 2011); Javier Cantero
- Manager: Antonio Mohamed (Until 5 September 2011); Daniel Garnero(interimn) (Until 11 September 2011); Ramón Díaz (Until 4 March 2012); Cristian Díaz (interimn)
- Stadium: Estadio Libertadores de América
- Torneo Apertura: 8th
- Torneo Clausura: 13th
- Suruga Bank Championship: Runner up
- Recopa Sudamericana: Runner up
- Copa Sudamericana: Round of 16
- Copa Argentina: Round of 32
- Top goalscorer: League: Ernesto Farías; Parra (4 goals each); All: Facundo Parra (6 goals)
- Highest home attendance: 37,00 vs. Internacional (August 10, 2011)
- Lowest home attendance: 18,000 vs. Colón (September 16, 2011)
- Average home league attendance: 30,985
Home colours	Away colours

Club Atlético Independiente's 2011–12 season is the club's 106th year of existence. Independiente this season going to play the Torneo Apertura, the Torneo Clausura, the Surugua Bank Championship, the Recopa Sudamericana, the Copa Sudamericana and the Copa Argentina.

== Squad ==
As of March 4, 2012

No.	Name	Nationality	Position	Date of birth (age)	Signed from	Notes
1	Hilario Navarro	(Argentina)	GK	November 14, 1980 (age 45)	(Argentina) San Lorenzo	
2	Julián Velázquez	(Argentina)	DF	October 23, 1990 (age 36)	The Academy	
3	Lucas Kruspzky	(Argentina)	DF	April 6, 1992 (age 34)	The Academy	
4	Cristian Báez	(Paraguay)	DF	April 9, 1990 (age 36)	The Academy	
5	Roberto Battión	(Argentina)	MF	March 1, 1982 (age 44)	(Argentina) Banfield	
6	Eduardo Tuzzio	(Argentina)	DF	July 31, 1974 (age 52)	(Argentina) River Plate	
7	Cristian Pellerano	(Argentina)	MF	February 1, 1982 (age 44)	(Argentina) Colón	
8	Hernán Fredes	(Argentina)	MF	March 27, 1987 (age 39)	(Ukraine) Metalist Kharkiv	
9	Leonel Núñez	(Argentina)	FW	October 13, 1983 (age 43)	(Turkey) Bursaspor	
10	Patricio Rodríguez	(Argentina)	MF	May 4, 1990 (age 36)	The Academy	
11	Osmar Ferreyra	(Argentina)	MF	January 9, 1983 (age 43)	(Ukraine) Dnipro Dnipropetrovsk	
12	Adrián Gabbarini	(Argentina)	GK	October 10, 1985 (age 41)	(Argentina) Independiente Rivadavia	
13	Iván Vélez	(Colombia)	DF	August 16, 1984 (age 42)	(Colombia) Once Caldas	Out on January 17, 2012
14	Fabián Monserrat	(Argentina)	MF	June 25, 1992 (age 34)	The Academy	
15	Fernando Godoy	(Argentina)	MF	May 1, 1990 (age 36)	The Academy	
16	Patricio Vidal	(Argentina)	MF	April 8, 1992 (age 34)	(Chile) Santiago Morning	
17	Facundo Parra	(Argentina)	FW	June 15, 1985 (age 41)	(Argentina) Chacarita Juniors	
18	Gabriel Milito	(Argentina)	DF	September 7, 1980 (age 46)	(Spain) Barcelona	Captain
19	Ernesto Farías	(Argentina)	FW	May 29, 1980 (age 46)	(Brazil) Cruzeiro	In on January 17, 2012
20	Matías Defederico	(Argentina)	FW	August 23, 1989 (age 37)	(Brazil) Corinthians	
21	Fabián Assmann	(Argentina)	GK	March 23, 1986 (age 40)	(Spain) Las Palmas	
22	Iván Pérez	(Argentina)	MF	May 23, 1990 (age 36)	The Academy	
23	Adrián Argachá	(Uruguay)	DF	December 21, 1986 (age 39)	(Uruguay) Defensor Sporting	
24	Leonel Galeano	(Argentina)	DF	August 3, 1991 (age 35)	The Academy	
25	Carlos Matheu	(Argentina)	DF	May 13, 1985 (age 41)	(Italy) Cagliari	Vice-captain
26	Francisco Pizzini	(Argentina)	FW	September 19, 1993 (age 33)	The Academy	
28	Gabriel Vallés	(Argentina)	DF	May 3, 1986 (age 40)	(Argentina) Godoy Cruz	
29	Martín Benítez	(Argentina)	FW	June 17, 1994 (age 32)	The Academy	
30	Diego Rodríguez	(Argentina)	GK	June 25, 1989 (age 37)	The Academy	
31	Lucas Villafáñez	(Argentina)	MF	October 4, 1991 (age 35)	(Argentina) Comisión de Actividades Infantiles	
32	Walter Busse	(Argentina)	MF	March 3, 1987 (age 39)	(Argentina) Gimnasia y Esgrima de Jujuy	
34	Brian Nieva	(Argentina)	FW	April 18, 1990 (age 36)	The Academy	
35	Nicolás Delmonte	(Argentina)	MF	May 10, 1989 (age 37)	(Albania) Dinamo Tirana	
36	Samuel Cáceres	(Paraguay)	DF	March 20, 1989 (age 37)	The Academy	Out on January 29, 2012
37	Diego Churín	(Argentina)	FW	January 12, 1989 (age 37)	(Argentina) Comunicaciones	
—	Ignacio Bracia	(Argentina)	DF	June 15, 1989 (age 37)	The Academy	
—	Federico Gay	(Argentina)	DF	December 7, 1991 (age 34)	The Academy	
—	Maximiliano Velázquez	(Argentina)	DF	September 12, 1980 (age 46)	(Argentina) Lanús	Out on February 9, 2012
—	Nicolás Cabrera	(Argentina)	MF	June 6, 1984 (age 42)	(Argentina) Vélez Sársfield	Out on January 10, 2012
—	Gino Clara	(Argentina)	MF	May 26, 1988 (age 38)	(Chile) Rangers	
—	Marco Pérez	(Colombia)	FW	September 18, 1990 (age 36)	(Spain) Real Zaragoza	Out on January 24, 2012

=== Winter transfers ===
Players In
Name	Nat	Pos	Moving from
Marco Pérez	COL	FW	(Spain) Real Zaragoza
Adrián Argachá	URU	DF	(Uruguay) Defensor Sporting
Gino Clara	ARG	MF	(Chile) Rangers
Osmar Ferreyra	ARG	MF	(Ukraine) Dnipro Dnipropetrovsk
Gabriel Milito	ARG	DF	(Spain) Barcelona

Players Out
Name	Nat	Pos	Moving to
Lucas Mareque	ARG	DF	(France) Lorient
Andrés Silvera	ARG	FW	(Argentina) Belgrano
Leandro Gracián	ARG	MF	(Argentina) Boca Juniors
Federico Mancuello	ARG	MF	(Argentina) Belgrano
Nicolás Martínez	ARG	MF	(Chile) Santiago Wanderers
Jairo Castillo	COL	FW	(Colombia) América de Cali

=== Summer transfers ===
Players In
Name	Nat	Pos	Moving from
Ernesto Farías	ARG	FW	(Brazil) Cruzeiro

Players Out
Name	Nat	Pos	Moving to
Nicolás Cabrera	ARG	MF	(Argentina) Gimnasia (La Plata)
Iván Vélez	COL	DF	(Colombia) Junior
Marco Pérez	COL	FW	(Argentina) Belgrano
Samuel Cáceres	PAR	DF	(Argentina) Nueva Chicago
Maximiliano Velázquez	ARG	DF	(Argentina) Lanús

== Player statistics ==
=== Team stats ===
	Torneo Apertura	Torneo Clausura	Suruga Bank Championship	Recopa Sudamericana	Copa Sudamericana	Copa Argentina
Games played	19	8	1	2	2	2
Games won	7	3	0	1	1	1
Games drawn	6	0	1	0	0	0
Games lost	6	5	0	1	1	1
Goals for	18	10	2	3	1	4
Goals against	17	14	2	4	2	2
Players used	35	23	16	16	23	22
Yellow cards	36	20	1	6	5	5
Red cards	2	2	0	0	1	0

Last updated: 31 March
Source: Competitive matches

=== Squad stats ===
Updated on 31 March 2012

			Torneo Apertura				Torneo Clausura				Suruga Bank Championship				Recopa Sudamericana				Copa Sudamericana				Copa Argentina				Total			
Nation	No.	Name	GS	App.	Min.	Goal	GS	App.	Min.	Goal	GS	App.	Min.	Goal	GS	App.	Min.	Goal	GS	App.	Min.	Goal	GS	App.	Min.	Goal	GS	App.	Min.	Goal
Goalkeepers
(Argentina)	1	Hilario Navarro	4	4	492	−5	4	4	286	−2	1	1	93	−2	2	2	189	−4	1	1	96	−2	1	1	91		12	12	1247	–17
(Argentina)	12	Adrián Gabbarini	3	3	285	−2	1	1	95																		4	4	380	–2
(Argentina)	21	Fabián Assmann	12	12	1137	−13													1	1	95						13	13	1232	–11
(Argentina)	30	Diego Rodríguez					3	3	286	−7													1	1	95	−2	4	4	381	–9
Defenders
(Argentina)	2	Julián Velázquez	15	15	1326		7	7	667		1	1	93		2	2	189		1	2	130		1	1	91		27	28	2549	
(Argentina)	3	Lucas Kruspzky					3	3	269														1	1	73		4	4	342	
(Paraguay)	4	Cristian Báez	1	1	95							1	47		1	1	96						2	2	186		4	5	424	
(Argentina)	6	Eduardo Tuzzio	16	16	1517	1	8	8	779		1	1	93	1	2	2	189		1	1	95						28	28	2673	2
(Colombia)	13	Iván Vélez	5	5	425						1	1	71			1	49		1	1	96						7	8	641	
(Argentina)	18	Gabriel Milito	19	19	1737		7	7	611						2	2	189		1	1	95						29	29	2632	
(Uruguay)	23	Adrián Argachá	5	5	381							1	21						2	2	153			1	23		7	9	579	
(Argentina)	24	Leonel Galeano	1	4	167		2	3	256										1	1	96		2	3	210		6	11	729	
(Argentina)	25	Carlos Matheu	1	2	151														1	1	96		1	1	95		4	4	342	
(Argentina)	28	Gabriel Vallés	2	2	189		1	2	119														1	1	68		4	5	376	
(Argentina)	—	Maximiliano Velázquez	14	15	1291						1	1	72		2	2	189	2									17	18	1552	2
Midfielders
(Argentina)	5	Roberto Battión	3	4	263		3	3	304	1	1	1	46														7	8	613	1
(Argentina)	7	Cristian Pellerano	14	15	1226	1	1	3	111		1	1	93		2	2	189		1	1	95						20	22	1714	1
(Argentina)	8	Hernán Fredes	5	7	470	1	5	7	544		1	1	93		2	2	180						1	1	91		14	18	1378	1
(Argentina)	10	Patricio Rodríguez	2	4	244		6	7	546			1	47						1	1	95						9	13	932	
(Argentina)	11	Osmar Ferreyra	11	17	1050	1	4	5	354	1	1	1	46		1	2	105			1	38		1	1	91	1	18	27	1732	3
(Argentina)	14	Fabián Monserrat					4	4	381	2													1	-	95		5	5	476	2
(Argentina)	15	Fernando Godoy	13	15	1238		5	6	423										1	1	88	1	1	95			20	23	1847	
(Argentina)	16	Patricio Vidal					3	4	291	1														1	35		3	5	326	1
(Argentina)	22	Iván Pérez	6	9	489	2	1	4	152						2	2	110		1	1	67			1	40		10	17	858	2
(Argentina)	31	Lucas Villafáñez	2	2	130		1	1	83														1	1	60		4	4	273	
(Argentina)	32	Walter Busse		5	163		4	5	299										1	1	61		1	2	116		6	13	639	
(Argentina)	35	Nicolás Delmonte	2	5	240														1	1	96		1	1	91		4	7	427	
(Argentina)	—	Nicolas Cabrera	3	7	324							1	22			1	30										3	9	376	
(Argentina)	—	Gino Clara		1	34															1	17							2	51	
Forwards
(Argentina)	9	Leonel Núñez	9	13	664	2	1	2	89			1	4		1	2	84		1	2	87	1					12	20	924	3
(Argentina)	17	Facundo Parra	17	18	1552	3	2	6	286	1	1	1	93	1	1	1	95		1	1	95		2	2	166	1	24	29	2267	6
(Argentina)	19	Ernesto Farías					7	7	684	4																	7	7	684	4
(Argentina)	20	Matías Defederico	11	14	1031	1	2	3	193						1	2	73		2	2	171						18	21	1469	1
(Argentina)	26	Francisco Pizzini		1	41																		1	1	95		1	2	136	
(Argentina)	29	Martín Benítez	2	5	260	2	2	4	227																		4	9	487	2
(Argentina)	34	Brian Nieva	3	5	213	1										1	64		2	2	51		1	2	81	1	6	11	405	2
(Argentina)	37	Diego Churín	1	2	143			1	12														1	2	113	1	2	5	268	1
(Colombia)	—	Marco Pérez	7	12	793	2					1	1	89		2	2	189	1	1	1	86						11	16	1157	3

=== Disciplinary records ===
Last updated on 31 March 2012.

No.	Pos	Nat	Name	Torneo Apertura			Torneo Clausura			Suruga Bank Championship			Recopa Sudamericana			Copa Sudamericana			Copa Argentina			Total		
No.	Pos	Nat	Name	Yellow card	(yellow card) (yellow-red card)	Red card	Yellow card	(yellow card) (yellow-red card)	Red card	Yellow card	(yellow card) (yellow-red card)	Red card	Yellow card	(yellow card) (yellow-red card)	Red card	Yellow card	(yellow card) (yellow-red card)	Red card	Yellow card	(yellow card) (yellow-red card)	Red card	Yellow card	(yellow card) (yellow-red card)	Red card
2	DF	(Argentina)	Julián Velázquez	2		1	4						1			1			1			9		1
3	DF	(Argentina)	Lucas Kruspzky																			3		
6	DF	(Argentina)	Eduardo Tuzzio	6			3						1									10		
7	MF	(Argentina)	Cristian Pellerano	5					1				1			1						7		1
8	MF	(Argentina)	Hernán Fredes	3			2						1									6		
9	FW	(Argentina)	Leonel Núñez	2			1															3		
10	MF	(Argentina)	Patricio Rodríguez	1			1									1						3		
11	MF	(Argentina)	Osmar Ferreyra				2						1									3		
13	DF	(Colombia)	Iván Vélez	1																		1		
14	MF	(Argentina)	Fabián Monserrat				1																1	
15	MF	(Argentina)	Fernando Godoy														1			1			2	
17	FW	(Argentina)	Facundo Parra	1			1															2		
18	DF	(Argentina)	Gabriel Milito	1			4															5		
19	FW	(Argentina)	Ernesto Farías				1															1		
20	FW	(Argentina)	Matías Defederico	4				1														4	1	
23	DF	(Uruguay)	Adrián Argachá	1		1										1						2		1
24	DF	(Argentina)	Leonel Galeano	1															1			2		
25	DF	(Argentina)	Carlos Matheu	1															1			2		
28	DF	(Argentina)	Gabriel Vallés	1															1			2		
34	FW	(Argentina)	Brian Nieva	1																		1		
35	MF	(Argentina)	Nicolás Delmonte	2																		2		
—	DF	(Argentina)	Maximiliano Velázquez	1						1			1									3		
			TOTALS	33		2	19	1	1	1			6			4	1		5			68	2	3

== Club ==
=== Starting XI ===
No.	Pos.	Nat.	Name	MS	Notes
21	GK	(Argentina)	Assmann	14	Navarro has eleven starts. Rodríguez D. has four starts. Gabbarini has four starts.
2	CB	(Argentina)	Velázquez	26	Matheu has three starts.
6	CB	(Argentina)	Tuzzio	27	Also plays at RB. Vallés has four starts. Kruspzky has three starts.
18	CB	(Argentina)	Milito	28	Báez has four starts. Galeano has four starts.
8	CM	(Argentina)	Fredes	13	Pérez has ten starts.
15	CM	(Argentina)	Godoy	20	Battión has six starts. Busse has four starts.
11	RM	(Argentina)	Ferreyra	18	Monserrat has five starts.
7	LM	(Argentina)	Pellerano	18	Also plays at CM. Argachá has 7 starts. Delmonte has four start. Villafáñez has four starts.
20	AM	(Argentina)	Defederico	15	Also plays at CF and RM. Rodríguez P. has eight starts.
17	CF	(Argentina)	Parra	23	Farías has six starts. Pizzini has one start.
9	CF	(Argentina)	Núñez	12	Nieva has six starts. Churín has two starts. Benítez has three starts. Vidal has two starts.

=== Current technical staff ===
Position	Staff
First team head coach	(Argentina) Ramón Díaz
Assistant coach	(Argentina) Emiliano Díaz (Argentina) Sebastián Rambert
Physical fitness coach	(Argentina) Ezequiel Domínguez (Argentina) Jorge Pidal

Last updated: 17 September
Source: Independiente official site

== Competitions ==
=== Pre-season ===
17 July 2011 Jesús Arellano farewell	Monterrey (Mexico)	1–0	(Argentina) Independiente	Monterrey, Mexico
19:00 UTC−06:00	Zavala 60'	Report		Stadium: Estadio Tecnológico; Attendance: 32,000; Referee: Mauricio Morales (Mexico)

22 July 2011 United States tour	Ventura County Fusion (United States)	0–3	(Argentina) Independiente	Oxnard, United States
19:00 UTC−08:00		Report	Núñez 27'; Parra 34'; I. Pérez 79'	Stadium: Oxnard College; Attendance: 1,000; Referee: Mark Geiger (United States)

24 July 2011 Revival Cup	Ajax (Netherlands)	5–1	(Argentina) Independiente	Amsterdam, Netherlands
14:30 UTC+02:00	Eriksen 6'; Özbiliz 47', 50', 54'; Ebecilio 74'	Report	Benítez 70'	Stadium: Amsterdam Arena; Attendance: 19,149; Referee: Richard Liesveld (Netherlands)

26 July 2011 United States tour	Portland Timbers (United States)	2–0	(Argentina) Independiente	Portland, United States
19:00 UTC−08:00	Zizzo 36'; Umony 39'; Purdy (yellow card) 84'; López (yellow card) 86'; Dike (yellow card) 90+2'	Report	I. Pérez (yellow card) 31'; J. Velázquez (yellow card) 41'; Pellerano (yellow card) 59'	Stadium: Jeld-Wen Field; Attendance: 18,627; Referee: Yader Reyes (United States)

=== Copa de Oro ===
Team	Pld	W	D	L	GF	GA	GD	Pts
Independiente (C)	2	1	1	0	1	0	+1	4
San Lorenzo	2	0	2	0	0	0	0	2
Boca Juniors	2	0	1	1	0	1	−1	1

(C) Champions

12 January 2012 Round 1	Independiente	0–0	San Lorenzo	Mar del Plata, Argentina
22:10 UTC−03:00	Galeano (yellow card) 14'	Report	Ortigoza (yellow card) 17'; Diego Martínez (yellow card) 71'; Méndez (yellow card) 86'	Stadium: Estadio José María Minella; Attendance: 20,000; Referee: Patricio Loustau

21 January 2012 Round 3	Boca Juniors	0–1	Independiente	Mar del Plata, Argentina
22:10 UTC−03:00	F. Sosa (yellow card) 2'; Schaivi (yellow card) 39'; Insaurralde (yellow card) 41'; Cvitanich (red card) 83'	Report	Ferreyra (yellow card) 25'; M. Velázquez (yellow card) 52'; Schaivi 90' (o.g.); Núñez (red card) 90+1'	Stadium: Estadio José María Minella; Attendance: 25,000; Referee: Néstor Pitana

=== Copa Provincia de Buenos Aires ===
28 January 2012 Final	Independiente	0–1	Racing	Mar del Plata, Argentina
22:10 UTC−03:00	Fredes (yellow card) 18'; Godoy (yellow card) 25' (yellow-red card) 90'; P. Rodríguez (yellow card) 60'; Milito (red card) 64'; M. Velázquez (yellow card) 71'	Report	Castro (yellow card) 35'; Hauche 61' (yellow card) 63' (red card) 67'	Stadium: Estadio José María Minella; Attendance: 25,000; Referee: Sergio Pezzotta

=== Overall ===
Competition	Started round	Current position / round	Final position / round	First match	Last match
Torneo Apertura	—	—	8th	16 August 2011	12 December 2011
Suruga Bank Championship	Final	—	Runner Up	3 August 2011	
Recopa Sudamericana	Final	—	Runner Up	10 August 2011	24 August 2011
Copa Sudamericana	Round of 16	—	Round of 16	28 September 2011	12 October 2011
Copa Argentina	Round of 64	—	Round of 32	23 November 2011	6 March 2012
Torneo Clausura	—	13th		11 February 2012	

Updated to match played 31 March
Source: Competitions

=== Suruga Bank Championship ===
3 August 2011 Final	Júbilo Iwata (Japan)	2–2 (4–2 p)	(Argentina) Independiente	Fukuroi, Japan
19:30 UTC+09:00	Battión 9' (o.g.); Funatani (yellow card) 11'; Arata 58'	Report	Tuzzio 32'; M. Velázquez (yellow card) 39'; Parra 47'	Stadium: Shizuoka Stadium; Attendance: 19,034; Referee: Lee Probert (England)
	Penalties
	Kobayashi (penalty scored); Yamada (penalty scored); Nasu (penalty missed); Komano (penalty scored); Fujita (penalty scored)		Núñez (penalty scored); Pellerano (penalty missed); Báez (penalty missed); Parra (penalty scored)

=== Recopa Sudamericana ===
10 August 2011 First leg	Independiente (Argentina)	2–1	(Brazil) Internacional	Avellaneda, Argentina
21:50 UTC−03:00	M. Velázquez 41'; Pellerano (yellow card) 68'; M. Pérez 72'; J. Velázquez (yellow card) 78'	Report	Bolívar (yellow card) 4'; Leandro Damião 36'; D'Alessandro (yellow card) 54'	Stadium: Estadio Libertadores de América; Attendance: 37,000; Referee: Wilmar Roldán (Colombia)

24 August 2011 Second leg	Internacional (Brazil)	3–1 (4–3 agg.)	(Argentina) Independiente	Porto Alegre, Brazil
21:50 UTC−03:00	Leandro Damião 19', 24'; Kléber 82' (pen.)	Report	M. Velázquez (yellow card) 22' (goal) 48'; Tuzzio (yellow card) 35'; Ferreyra (yellow card) 77'; Fredes (yellow card) 86'	Stadium: Estádio Beira-Rio; Attendance: 56,000; Referee: Jorge Larrionda (Uruguay)

=== Copa Sudamericana ===
28 September 2011 Round of 16; First Leg	LDU Quito (Ecuador)	2–0	(Argentina) Independiente	Quito, Ecuador
17:15 UTC−05:00	Urrutia (yellow card) 37'; Ambrosi 42'; Bolaños 52'; Calderon (yellow card) 75'; Guagua (yellow card) 85'	Report	J. Velázquez (yellow card) 74'	Stadium: Estadio Casablanca; Attendance: 30,000; Referee: Martín Vázquez (Uruguay)

12 October 2011 Round of 16; Second Leg	Independiente (Argentina)	1–0 (1–2 agg.)	(Ecuador) LDU Quito	Avellaneda, Argentina
21:15 UTC−03:00	Pellerano (yellow card) 31'; Argachá (yellow card) 38'; Núñez 45'; P. Rodríguez (yellow card) 62'; Godoy (yellow card) 63' (yellow-red card) 86'	Report	De La Cruz (yellow card) 49'; Urrutia (yellow card) 53'	Stadium: Estadio Libertadores de América; Attendance: 26,000; Referee: José Buitrago (Colombia)

=== Copa Argentina ===
23 November 2011 Round of 64	Independiente	4–0	Colegiales	Salta, Argentina
22:00 UTC−03:00	J. Velázquez (yellow card) 33'; Parra 44'; Vallés (yellow card) 51'; Ferreyra 65' (pen.); Churín 70' (pen.); Nieva 75'	Report	Buzzi (yellow card) 23'; Leguizamón Arce (yellow card) 64'; Farina (red card) 68'	Stadium: Estadio Padre Ernesto Martearena; Attendance: 10,000; Referee: Ramón Guaymas

6 March 2012 Round of 32	Independiente	0–2	Belgrano	Salta, Argentina
21:10 UTC−03:00	Godoy (yellow card) 11'; Galeano (yellow card) 70'; Matheu (yellow card) 87'	Report	Maldonado 5'; Lollo 71'; Pittinari (yellow card) 74'	Stadium: Estadio Padre Ernesto Martearena; Attendance: 10,000; Referee: Mauro Vigliano

=== Argentine Primera División ===
==== Torneo Apertura ====
Pos	Team	Pld	W	D	L	GF	GA	GD	Pts
6	Lanús	19	7	8	4	20	14	+6	29
7	Tigre	19	7	6	6	22	19	+3	27
8	Independiente	19	7	6	6	18	17	+1	27
9	San Martín (SJ)	19	6	8	5	17	14	+3	26
10	Atlético de Rafaela	19	8	2	9	22	26	−4	26

===== Results summary =====
Overall								Home						Away					
Pld	W	D	L	GF	GA	GD	Pts	W	D	L	GF	GA	GD	W	D	L	GF	GA	GD
19	7	6	6	18	17	+1	27	5	2	3	11	7	+4	2	4	3	7	10	−3

Last updated: 12 December.
Source: Competitive Matches

===== Results by round =====
Round	1	2	3	4	5	6	7	8	9	10	11	12	13	14	15	16	17	18	19	20
Ground	H	A	H	A	H	H	A	H	A	H	A	H	A	H	A	H	A	H	A	H
Result	P	L	W	D	L	W	L	L	W	L	D	W	L	D	D	W	D	D	W	W
Position	16	19	12	14	17	9	14	14	10	13	13	10	13	13	12	12	12	13	11	8

Updated to match(es) played on 12 December. Source:
A = Away; H = Home; W = Win; D = Draw; L = Loss; P = Postponed

===== Matches =====
6 August 2011 Round 1	Independiente	Postponed	San Martín (San Juan)	Avellaneda, Argentina
--:-- UTC−03:00				Stadium: Estadio Libertadores de América
Note: The match was postponed for the Independiente's participation in the 2011 Suruga Bank Championship.

16 August 2011 Round 2	Lanús	1–0	Independiente	Lanús, Argentina
17:00 UTC−03:00	Izquierdoz (yellow card) 59'; Pavone 90+3'	Report	Núñez (yellow card) 63'; Tuzzio (yellow card) 82'; Fredes (yellow card) 90+2'	Stadium: Estadio Ciudad de Lanús; Attendance: 15,000; Referee: Néstor Pitana

21 August 2011 Round 3	Independiente	1–0	Estudiantes	Avellaneda, Argentina
21:00 UTC−03:00	Defederico (yellow card) 19'; Argachá (yellow card) 41' (red card) 43'; M. Pérez 46'	Report	Braña (yellow card) 3'; Benítez (yellow card) 22'; Cellay (yellow card) 58'; G. Fernández (yellow card) 87'	Stadium: Estadio Libertadores de América; Attendance: 35,000; Referee: Saúl Laverni

28 August 2011 Round 4	Argentinos Juniors	0–0	Independiente	Buenos Aires, Argentina
20:15 UTC−03:00	Berardo (yellow card) 49'; E. Hernández (yellow card) 59'; P. Hernández (yellow card) 75'; Laba (yellow card) 80'	Report	Pellerano (yellow card) 75'	Stadium: Estadio Diego Armando Maradona; Attendance: 20,000; Referee: Pablo Lunati

4 September 2011 Round 5	Independiente	0–1	Boca Juniors	Avellaneda, Argentina
18:10 UTC−03:00	Pellerano (yellow card) 69'	Report	Rivero (yellow card) 16'; Schiavi 49'; Viatri (yellow card) 62'; Somoza (yellow card) 79'	Stadium: Estadio Libertadores de América; Attendance: 36,000; Referee: Héctor Baldassi

7 September 2011 Round 1	Independiente	2–1	San Martín (San Juan)	Avellaneda, Argentina
21:10 UTC−03:00	Pellerano 21'; Milito (yellow card) 22'; Cantero 41' (o.g.)	Report	Grabinski (yellow card) 33'; Bustos (yellow card) 39'; García 53'; Cantero (yellow card) 84'; Pocrnjic (yellow card) 90+2'	Stadium: Estadio Libertadores de América; Attendance: 29,000; Referee: Pablo Díaz

11 September 2011 Round 6	Belgrano	2–0	Independiente	Córdoba, Argentina
16:00 UTC−03:00	R. Rodríguez (yellow card) 26'; Pereyra 37', 46' (yellow card) 49'; Turus (yellow card) 49'; Barrios (yellow card) 90+1'; Etevenaux (yellow card) 90+1'	Report	Pellerano (yellow card) 51'; Vélez (yellow card) 90'	Stadium: Estadio Mario Alberto Kempes; Attendance: 50,000; Referee: Gabriel Favale

16 September 2011 Round 7	Independiente	0–1	Colón	Avellaneda, Argentina
17:00 UTC−03:00		Report	Higuaín 16'; Costa 26'	Stadium: Estadio Libertadores de América; Attendance: 18,000; Referee: Saúl Laverni

21 September 2011 Round 8	Atlético de Rafaela	1–3	Independiente	Rafaela, Argentina
17:05 UTC−03:00	Castro 66'	Report	Matheu (yellow card) 12'; Núñez 22'; Nieva 24'; Delmonte (yellow card) 71'; Parra (yellow card) 88'; Ferreyra 90+3'	Stadium: Estadio Rafaela; Attendance: 16,000; Referee: Juan Pablo Pompei

25 September 2011 Round 9	Independiente	0–1	Vélez Sársfield	Avellaneda, Argentina
11:00 UTC−03:00		Report	J. Ramírez 34'	Stadium: Estadio Libertadores de América; Attendance: 34,000; Referee: Néstor Pitana

2 October 2011 Round 10	Racing	1–1	Independiente	Avellaneda, Argentina
16:10 UTC−03:00	Hauche 1'; Martínez (yellow card) 26'	Report	Parra 27'; Nieva (yellow card) 32'; M. Velázquez (yellow card) 83'	Stadium: Estadio Juan Domingo Perón; Attendance: 60,000; Referee: Sergio Pezzotta

15 October 2011 Round 11	Independiente	2–1	Godoy Cruz	Avellaneda, Argentina
14:00 UTC−03:00	Núñez 48' (yellow card) 90+2'; M. Pérez 89'	Report	Sigali (yellow card) 5'; Ramírez 63'; G. Cabrera (yellow card) 67'; Damonte (yellow card) 90+3'	Stadium: Estadio Libertadores de América; Attendance: 25,000; Referee: Silvio Trucco

24 October 2011 Round 12	Banfield	3–0	Independiente	Banfield, Argentina
22:05 UTC−03:00	Tagliafico (yellow card) 33'; F. Ferreyra 54', 58'; Acevedo 90'	Report	J. Velázquez (red card) 30'; Defederico (yellow card) 70'; Tuzzio (yellow card) 84'	Stadium: Estadio Florencio Solá; Attendance: 20,000; Referee: Mauro Vigliano

29 October 2011 Round 13	Independiente	0–0	Arsenal	Avellaneda, Argentina
22:15 UTC−03:00	Pellerano (yellow card) 69'; Tuzzio (yellow card) 89'	Report	López (yellow card) 34'; Aguirre (yellow card) 48'	Stadium: Estadio Libertadores de América; Attendance: 30,000; Referee: Sergio Pezzota

4 November 2011 Round 14	All Boys	2–2	Independiente	Buenos Aires, Argentina
17:05 UTC−03:00	Sánchez (yellow card) 4'; Soto (yellow card) 5'; Matos 18', 60'; Cambiasso (yellow card) 21'; Quiroga (yellow card) 25'; Stefanatto (yellow card) 68'	Report	Delmonte (yellow card) 4'; Defederico 9' (yellow card) 37'; Vallés (yellow card) 46'; I. Pérez 53'	Stadium: Estadio Islas Malvinas; Attendance: 20,000; Referee: Silvio Trucco

19 November 2011 Round 15	Independiente	3–0	Olimpo	Avellaneda, Argentina
19:10 UTC−03:00	Tuzzio 34' (yellow card) 72'; J. Velázquez (yellow card) 45+1'; I. Pérez 49'; Parra 72'; Defederico (yellow card) 79'	Report	Musto (yellow card) 30' (yellow-red card) 69'; Villanueva (yellow card) 67'; Faccioli (yellow card) 71'; Vizcarrondo (yellow card) 88'	Stadium: Estadio Libertadores de América; Attendance: 20,000; Referee: Mauro Vigliano

28 November 2011 Round 16	Unión	0–0	Independiente	Santa Fé, Argentina
21:10 UTC−03:00	Rosales (yellow card) 58'; Avendaño (yellow card) 70'; A. Fernández (yellow card) 86'	Report	Pellerano (yellow card) 57'; Tuzzio (yellow card) 58'	Stadium: Estadio 15 de Abril; Attendance: 22,300; Referee: Luis Álvarez

4 December 2011 Round 17	Independiente	1–1	Newell's Old Boys	Avellaneda, Argentina
17:00 UTC−03:00	J. Velázquez (yellow card) 34'; Benítez 51'; P. Rodríguez (yellow card) 75'	Report	P. Pérez 17' (yellow card) 34'	Stadium: Estadio Libertadores de América; Attendance: 36,000; Referee: Diego Abal

8 December 2011 Round 18	San Lorenzo	0–1	Independiente	Buenos Aires, Argentina
22:10 UTC−03:00	Martínez (yellow card) 76'	Report	Tuzzio (yellow card) 42'; Fredes (yellow card) 55'; Benítez 67'	Stadium: Estadio Pedro Bidegain; Attendance: 30,000; Referee: Pablo Lunati

12 December 2011 Round 19	Independiente	2–1	Tigre	Avellaneda, Argentina
21:15 UTC−03:00	Galeano (yellow card) 39'; Parra 56' (pen.); Fredes 66' (yellow card) 85'; P. Rodríguez (yellow card) 88'	Report	Morales 13' (pen.); Castaño (yellow card) 50'	Stadium: Estadio Libertadores de América; Attendance: 35,000; Referee: Sergio Pezzotta

==== Torneo Clausura ====
Pos	Team	Pld	W	D	L	GF	GA	GD	Pts
14	Belgrano	19	6	6	7	17	20	−3	24
15	San Martín (SJ)	19	6	4	9	21	29	−8	22
16	Independiente	19	5	5	9	22	28	−6	20
17	Racing	19	5	4	10	19	27	−8	19
18	Godoy Cruz	19	2	8	9	11	25	−14	14

===== Results summary =====
Overall								Home						Away					
Pld	W	D	L	GF	GA	GD	Pts	W	D	L	GF	GA	GD	W	D	L	GF	GA	GD
8	3	0	5	10	12	−2	9	3	0	2	9	5	+4	0	0	3	1	7	−6

Last updated: 25 March.
Source: Competitive Matches

===== Results by round =====
Round	1	2	3	4	5	6	7	8	9	10	11	12	13	14	15	16	17	18	19
Ground	A	H	A	H	A	H	A	H	A	H	A	H	A	H	A	H	H	H	A
Result	L	L	L	L	W	W	L	W	D	W									
Position	17	19	20	20	20	16	19	13	13	11									

Updated to match(es) played on 25 March. Source:
A = Away; H = Home; W = Win; D = Draw; L = Loss

===== Matches =====
11 February 2012 Round 1	San Martín (San Juan)	1–0	Independiente	San Juan, Argentina
21:15 UTC−03:00	Más (yellow card) 41'; Caprari 61'	Report	Velázquez (yellow card) 39'; Defederico (yellow card) 65' (yellow-red card) 90+1'; Núñez (yellow card) 67'; Milito (yellow card) 68'	Stadium: Estadio Ingeniero Hilario Sánchez; Attendance: 19,000; Referee: Saúl Laverni

19 February 2012 Round 2	Independiente	0–1	Lanús	Avellaneda, Argentina
17:00 UTC−03:00	Ferreyra (yellow card) 46'		Pizarro (yellow card) 64'; Valeri (yellow card) 72'; Pavone 88'	Stadium: Estadio Libertadores de América; Attendance: 30,000; Referee: Diego Abal

25 February 2012 Round 3	Estudiantes	2–0	Independiente	La Plata, Argentina
19:10 UTC−03:00	G. Fernández 21'; Desabato (yellow card) 24'; Braña (yellow card) 49'; Modón (yellow card) 61'; Carrillo 79'	Report	Velázquez (yellow card) 8'; Kruspzky (yellow card) 37'; Fredes (yellow card) 45'; Parra (yellow card) 82'	Stadium: Estadio Ciudad de La Plata; Attendance: 30,000; Referee: Juan Pablo Pompei

3 March 2012 Round 4	Independiente	1–3	Argentinos Juniors	Avellaneda, Argentina
19:10 UTC−03:00	Kruspzky (yellow card) 6'; Milito (yellow card) 51'; Fredes (yellow card) 52'; Battión 63'	Report	Batista 9'; Bordagaray 45+13' (yellow card) 60'; Barzola (yellow card) 61'	Stadium: Estadio Libertadores de América; Attendance: 32,000; Referee: Federico Beligoy

11 March 2012 Round 5	Boca Juniors	4–5	Independiente	Buenos Aires, Argentina
19:10 UTC−03:00	Roncaglia 12', 51'; Riquelme 45+1'; Ledesma 74'	Report	Vidal 1'; Ferreyra 7' (yellow card) 40'; Farías 32', 90+1', 90+5'; Tuzzio (yellow card) 51'; Milito (yellow card) 55'	Stadium: Estadio Alberto J. Armando; Attendance: 59,000; Referee: Saúl Laverni

17 March 2012 Round 6	Independiente	2–0	Belgrano	Avellaneda, Argentina
20:30 UTC−03:00	Farías 75'; P. Rodríguez (yellow card) 83'; Monserrat (yellow card) 85' (goal) 86'	Report	Lollo (yellow card) 21'; R. Rodríguez (yellow card) 80'; C. Pérez (yellow card) 82'	Stadium: Estadio Libertadores de América; Attendance: 35,000; Referee: Germán Delfino

25 March 2012 Round 7	Colón	3–0	Independiente	Santa Fé, Argentina
18:15 UTC−03:00	Chevantón 42'; Moreno y Fabianesi 54'; Mugni 60' (yellow card) 61'; Garcé (yellow card) 69'; Batista (yellow card) 73'; González (yellow card) 80'	Report	Tuzzio (yellow card) 18'; Farías (yellow card) 33'; Velázquez (yellow card) 66'; Pellerano (red card) 78'	Stadium: Estadio Brigadier Estanislao López; Attendance: 30,000; Referee: Diego Ceballos

31 March 2012 Round 8	Independiente	2–0	Atlético de Rafaela	Avellaneda, Argentina
20:30 UTC−03:00	Velázquez (yellow card) 44'; Parra 56'; Milito (yellow card) 63'; Tuzzio (yellow card) 73'; Monserrat 79'	Report	Zbrun (yellow card) 61'; Carignano (yellow card) 78'	Stadium: Estadio Libertadores de América; Attendance: 35,000; Referee: Pablo Díaz

6 April 2012 Round 9	Vélez Sársfield	1–1	Independiente	Buenos Aires, Argentina
21:15 UTC−03:00	Pratto 23'; Cubero (yellow card) 67'; Domínguez (yellow card) 77'		Parra 4'; Villafáñez (yellow card) 14'; Argachá (yellow card) 26'; Tuzzio (yellow card) 59'; Velázquez (yellow card) 74'; Parra (yellow card) 87'	Stadium: Estadio José Amalfitani; Attendance: 50,000; Referee: Alejandro Toia

14 April 2012 Round 10	Independiente	4–1	Racing Club	Avellaneda, Argentina
18:00 UTC−03:00	Godoy (yellow card) 11'; Galeano (yellow card) 29'; Parra 35', 57'; Velázquez (yellow card) 69'; Vidal 92'; Rodríguez 95'; Rodríguez (yellow card) 95'		Gutiérrez 29'; Aveldaño (yellow card) 34'; Martínez (yellow card) 55'; Zuculini (red card) 57'; Castro (yellow card) 64'; Gutiérrez (red card) 67'; Hauche (yellow card) 82'; Cáceres (yellow card) 88'	Stadium: Estadio Libertadores de América; Attendance: 40,000; Referee: Sergio Pezzotta

22 April 2012 Round 11	Godoy Cruz	0–0	Independiente	Mendoza, Argentina
20:10 UTC−03:00	Ramírez (yellow card) 24'; Cabrera (red card) 73'; Cooper (yellow card) 88'		Argachá (yellow card) 14'; Milito (yellow card) 34'; Ferreyra (yellow card) 53'; Argachá (red card) 83'	Stadium: Estadio Malvinas Argentinas; Referee: Silvio Trucco

28 April 2012 Round 12	Independiente	2–0	Banfield	Avellaneda, Argentina
--:-- UTC−03:00				Stadium: Estadio Libertadores de América

5 May 2012 Round 13	Arsenal	3–1	Independiente	Sarandí, Argentina
--:-- UTC−03:00				Stadium: Estadio Julio Humberto Grondona

12 May 2012 Round 14	Independiente	0–3	All Boys	Avellaneda, Argentina
--:-- UTC−03:00				Stadium: Estadio Libertadores de América

20 May 2012 Round 15	Olimpo	2–1	Independiente	Bahía Blanca, Argentina
--:-- UTC−03:00				Stadium: Estadio Roberto Natalio Carminatti

27 May 2012 Round 16	Independiente	0–0	Unión	Avellaneda, Argentina
--:-- UTC−03:00				Stadium: Estadio Libertadores de América

9 June 2012 Round 17	Newell's Old Boys	2–1	Independiente	Rosario, Argentina
--:-- UTC−03:00				Stadium: Estadio Marcelo Bielsa

17 June 2012 Round 18	Independiente	0–0	San Lorenzo	Avellaneda, Argentina
--:-- UTC−03:00				Stadium: Estadio Libertadores de América

24 June 2012 Round 19	Tigre	2-2	Independiente	Victoria, Argentina
--:-- UTC−03:00				Stadium: Estadio Monumental de Victoria

==== International cups qualification ====
Pos	Team	Pld	W	D	L	GF	GA	GD	Pts	Qualification
3	Lanús	38	17	13	8	49	30	+19	64	2012 Copa Libertadores Second Stage
4	Godoy Cruz	38	16	10	12	61	52	+9	58	2012 Copa Libertadores Second Stage
5	Independiente	38	14	14	10	48	37	+11	56	2012 Copa Sudamericana Second Stage
6	Racing	38	14	12	12	41	34	+7	54	2012 Copa Sudamericana Second Stage
7	Tigre	38	13	13	12	47	45	+2	52	2012 Copa Sudamericana Second Stage

Rules for classification: 1st points; 2nd goal difference; 3rd goals scored; 4th head-to-head points; 5th head-to-head goal difference; 6th head-to-head goals scored.

==== Relegation ====
Pos	Team	2009–10 Pts	2010–11 Pts	2011–12 Pts	Total Pts	Total Pld	Avg	Relegation
5	Argentinos Juniors	73	54	33	160	103	1.553	
6	Lanús	60	63	36	159	103	1.544	
7	Independiente	68	43	36	147	103	1.427	
8	Godoy Cruz	53	63	31	147	103	1.427	
9	Colón	55	47	41	143	103	1.388	

Updated as of games played on March 31, 2012.
