= 2011 Recopa Sudamericana =

- Event: Recopa Sudamericana
Independiente	Internacional
(Argentina)	(Brazil)
3	4
- (on aggregate; tied on points 3–3, Internacional won on goal difference)

First leg
Independiente	Internacional
2	1
- Date: August 10, 2011
- Venue: Estadio Libertadores de América, Avellaneda
- Referee: Wilmar Roldán (Colombia)

Second leg
Internacional	Independiente
3	1
- Date: August 24, 2011
- Venue: Estádio Beira-Rio, Porto Alegre
- Referee: Jorge Larrionda (Uruguay)

The 2011 Recopa Sudamericana was the 19th edition of the Recopa Sudamericana, the football competition organized by CONMEBOL between the winners of the previous season's two major South American club tournaments, the Copa Libertadores and the Copa Sudamericana. It was contested between Brazilian club Internacional, the 2010 Copa Libertadores champion, and Argentine club Independiente, the 2010 Copa Sudamericana champion.

Internacional lost the first leg 2–1, but won the second leg 3–1, claiming their second Recopa Sudamericana title.

== Qualified teams ==
Team	Qualification	Previous app.
(Brazil) Internacional	2010 Copa Libertadores champion	**2007**, 2009
(Argentina) Independiente	2010 Copa Sudamericana champion	**1995**, 1996

Bold indicates winning years

== Rules ==
The Recopa Sudamericana is played over two legs; home and away. The team that qualified via the Copa Libertadores plays the second leg at home. The team that accumulates the most points —three for a win, one for a draw, zero for a loss— after the two legs is crowned the champion. Should the two teams be tied on points after the second leg, the team with the best goal difference wins. If the two teams have equal goal difference, the away goals rule is not applied. Extra time is played, which consists of two 15-minute halves. If the tie is still not broken, a penalty shootout ensues according to the Laws of the Game.

== Venues ==
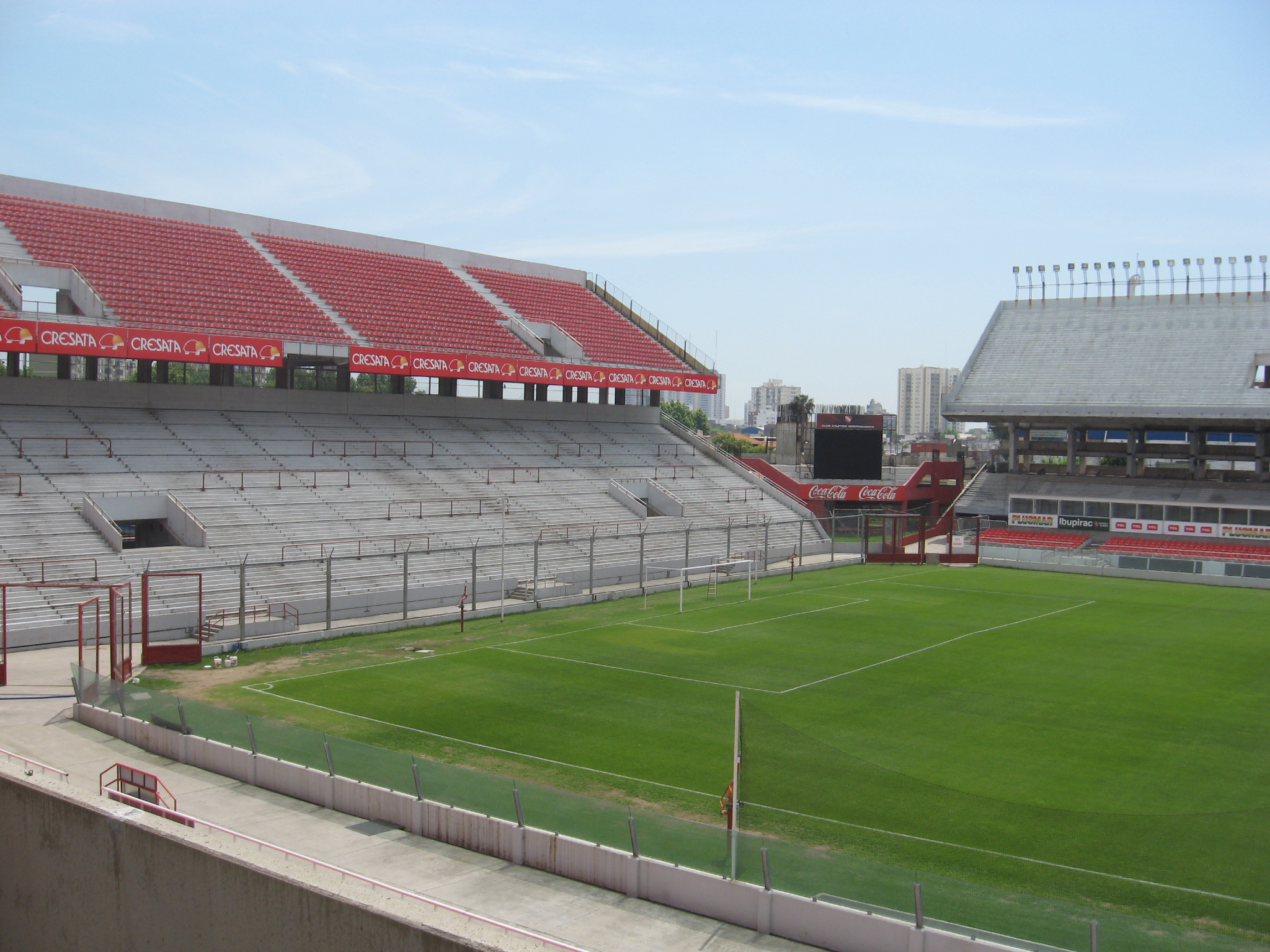
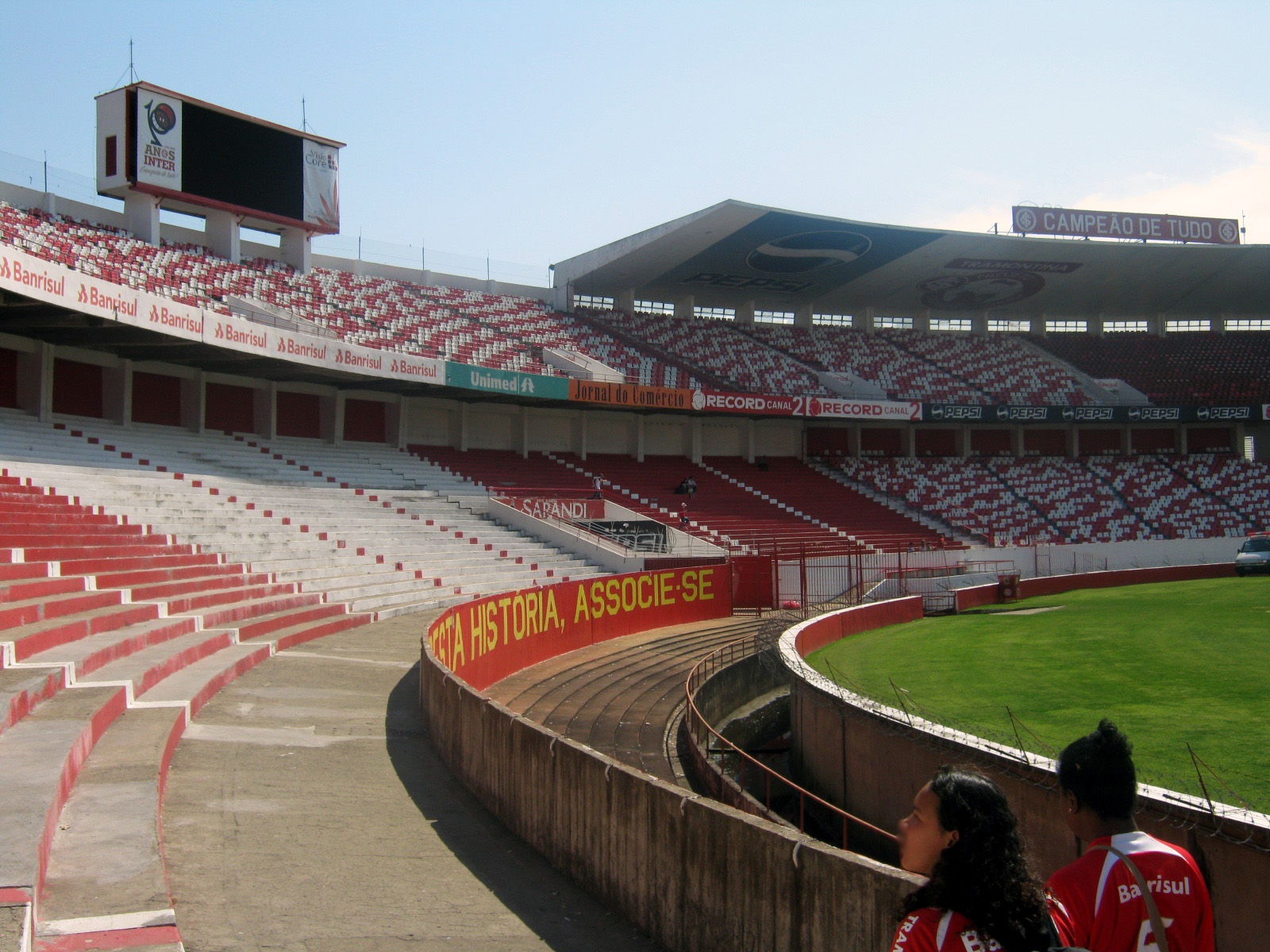
Estadio Libertadores de América (left) and Estádio Beira-Rio, venues of the series

== Match details ==
=== First leg ===
2011 Recopa Sudamericana
August 10, 2011
21:50 UTC−03:00
First leg

Independiente (Argentina)	2–1	(Brazil) Internacional
M. Velázquez 41'; Pérez 72'	Report	Leandro Damião 36'

Estadio Libertadores de América, Avellaneda
Attendance: 40,000
Referee: Wilmar Roldán (Colombia)

**Independiente**	**Internacional**

GK	1	(Argentina) Hilario Navarro
DF	6	(Argentina) Eduardo Tuzzio (c)
DF	2	(Argentina) Julián Velázquez	(yellow card) 78'
DF	18	(Argentina) Gabriel Milito
DF	3	(Argentina) Maximiliano Velázquez
MF	7	(Argentina) Cristian Pellerano	(yellow card) 69'
MF	8	(Argentina) Hernán Fredes
MF	22	(Argentina) Iván Pérez		(substituted off) 63'
FW	20	(Argentina) Matías Defederico		(substituted off) 63'
FW	19	(Colombia) Marco Pérez
FW	9	(Argentina) Leonel Núñez		(substituted off) 74'
Substitutes:
GK	12	(Argentina) Adrián Gabbarini
DF	23	(Uruguay) Adrián Argachá
DF	4	(Paraguay) Cristian Báez
MF	16	(Argentina) Nicolás Cabrera		(substituted on) 63'
MF	11	(Argentina) Osmar Ferreyra		(substituted on) 74'
MF	5	(Argentina) Roberto Battión
FW	24	(Argentina) Brian Nieva		(substituted on) 63'
Manager:
(Argentina) Antonio Mohamed

GK	1	(Brazil) Muriel
DF	4	(Brazil) Nei
DF	2	(Brazil) Bolívar (c)	(yellow card) 6'
DF	3	(Brazil) Índio
DF	6	(Brazil) Kléber		(substituted off) 21'
MF	8	(Brazil) Wilson Mathías
MF	20	(Brazil) Elton
MF	7	(Brazil) Tinga
MF	10	(Argentina) Andrés D'Alessandro	(yellow card) 55'	(substituted off) 76'
FW	18	(Brazil) Jô		(substituted off) 76'
FW	9	(Brazil) Leandro Damião
Substitutes:
GK	12	(Brazil) Renan
DF	13	(Brazil) Rodrigo Moledo
DF	14	(Brazil) Fabrício		(substituted on) 21'
MF	19	(Brazil) Glaydson
MF	17	(Brazil) Andrezinho		(substituted on) 76'
MF	21	(Brazil) João Paulo
FW	24	(Brazil) Marquinhos		(substituted on) 76'
Manager:
(Brazil) Osmar Loss

Assistant referees:
Abraham González (Colombia)
Humberto Clavijo (Colombia)
Fourth official:
Albert Duarte (Colombia)

=== Second leg ===
August 24, 2011
21:50 UTC−03:00
Second leg

Internacional (Brazil)	3–1	(Argentina) Independiente
Leandro Damião 19', 24'; Kléber 82' (pen.)	Report	M. Velázquez 48'

Estádio Beira-Rio, Porto Alegre
Attendance: 39,000
Referee: Jorge Larrionda (Uruguay)

**Internacional**	**Independiente**

GK	1	(Brazil) Muriel
DF	4	(Brazil) Nei
DF	3	(Brazil) Índio
DF	2	(Brazil) Bolívar (c)
DF	6	(Brazil) Kléber
MF	10	(Argentina) Andrés D'Alessandro	(substituted off) 69'
MF	5	(Argentina) Pablo Guiñazú
MF	20	(Brazil) Elton
MF	16	(Brazil) Oscar
FW	11	(Brazil) Dellatorre	(substituted off) 71'
FW	9	(Brazil) Leandro Damião
Substitutes:
GK	12	(Brazil) Renan
DF	15	(Brazil) Juan
MF	19	(Brazil) Glaydson
MF	7	(Brazil) Tinga
MF	17	(Brazil) Andrezinho	(substituted on) 69'
MF	21	(Brazil) João Paulo
FW	18	(Brazil) Jô	(substituted on) 71'
Manager:
(Brazil) Dorival Júnior

GK	1	(Argentina) Hilario Navarro
DF	6	(Argentina) Eduardo Tuzzio (c)	(yellow card) 35'
DF	2	(Argentina) Julián Velázquez
DF	18	(Argentina) Gabriel Milito
DF	3	(Argentina) Maximiliano Velázquez	(yellow card) 23'
MF	8	(Argentina) Hernán Fredes	(yellow card) 86'	(substituted off) 86'
MF	7	(Argentina) Cristian Pellerano
MF	22	(Argentina) Iván Pérez		(substituted off) 46'
MF	11	(Argentina) Osmar Ferreyra	(yellow card) 78'	(substituted off) 86'
FW	19	(Colombia) Marco Pérez
FW	17	(Argentina) Facundo Parra
Substitutes:
GK	21	(Argentina) Fabián Assmann
DF	13	(Colombia) Iván Vélez		(substituted on) 46'
DF	23	(Uruguay) Adrián Argachá
MF	16	(Argentina) Nicolás Cabrera
MF	5	(Argentina) Roberto Battión
FW	9	(Argentina) Leonel Núñez		(substituted on) 86'
FW	20	(Argentina) Matías Defederico		(substituted on) 86'
Manager:
(Argentina) Antonio Mohamed

Assistant referees:
Pablo Fandiño (Uruguay)
Mauricio Espinosa (Uruguay)
Fourth official:
Liber Prudente (Uruguay)
