= 2011 Suruga Bank Championship =

Júbilo Iwata	Independiente
(Japan)	(Argentina)
2	2
- Júbilo Iwata won 4–2 in penalty shootout
- Date: 3 August 2011
- Venue: Shizuoka Stadium, Fukuroi
- Referee: Lee Probert (England)
- Attendance: 19,034

The 2011 Suruga Bank Championship (Japanese: スルガ銀行チャンピオンシップ2011; Spanish: Copa Suruga Bank 2011) was the fourth edition of the Suruga Bank Championship, the club football match co-organized by the Japan Football Association, the football governing body of Japan, and CONMEBOL, the football governing body of South America, between the winners of the previous season's J. League Cup and Copa Sudamericana. It was contested by Japanese club Júbilo Iwata, the 2010 J. League Cup champion, and Argentine club Independiente, the 2010 Copa Sudamericana champion.

Júbilo Iwata won 4–2 in penalty shootout, after drawing 2–2 in the ninety minutes of play.

== Qualified teams ==
Team	Qualification	Previous appearances
(Japan) Júbilo Iwata	2010 J. League Cup champion	None
(Argentina) Independiente	2010 Copa Sudamericana champion	None

== Rules ==
The Suruga Bank Championship is played over one match, hosted by the winner of the J. League Cup. If the score is tied at the end of regulation, the winner is determined by a penalty shootout (no extra time is played). A maximum of seven substitutions may be made during the match.

== Match details ==
3 August 2011
19:00 UTC+09:00

Júbilo Iwata (Japan)	2–2	(Argentina) Independiente
Battión 10' (o.g.); Arata 57'	Report	Tuzzio 32'; Parra 47'
Penalties
Kobayashi (penalty scored); Yamada (penalty scored); Nasu (penalty missed); Komano (penalty scored); Fujita (penalty scored)	4–2	(penalty scored) Núñez; (penalty missed) Pellerano; (penalty missed) Báez; (penalty scored) Parra

Shizuoka Stadium, Fukuroi
Attendance: 19,034
Referee: Lee Probert (England)

Júbilo Iwata	Independiente

JÚBILO IWATA:
GK	1	(Japan) Yoshikatsu Kawaguchi
DF	2	(Japan) Kenichi Kaga
DF	33	(Japan) Yoshiaki Fujita
DF	3	(Japan) Ryu Okada		(substituted off) 61'
MF	5	(Japan) Yuichi Komano
MF	20	(Japan) Shuto Yamamoto
MF	28	(Japan) Keisuke Funatani	(yellow card) 11'	(substituted off) 46'
MF	23	(Japan) Kosuke Yamamoto		(substituted off) 67'
MF	6	(Japan) Daisuke Nasu (c)
MF	10	(Japan) Hiroki Yamada
FW	8	(Brazil) Gilsinho		(substituted off) 75'
Substitutes:
GK	21	(Japan) Naoki Hatta
DF	22	(Japan) Hiroyuki Kobayashi		(substituted in) 61'
DF	16	(Japan) Jo Kanazawa
DF	30	(Japan) Shinnosuke Honda
MF	15	(Japan) Minoru Suganuma		(substituted in) 75'
FW	17	(Japan) Hidetaka Kanazono		(substituted in) 67'
FW	19	(Japan) Tomoyuki Arata		(substituted in) 46'
Manager:
(Japan) Masaaki Yanagishita

INDEPENDIENTE:
GK	1	(Argentina) Hilario Navarro
DF	13	(Colombia) Iván Vélez		(substituted off) 70'
DF	6	(Argentina) Eduardo Tuzzio (c)
DF	2	(Argentina) Julián Velázquez
DF	3	(Argentina) Maximiliano Velázquez	(yellow card) 39'	(substituted off) 71'
MF	8	(Argentina) Hernán Fredes
MF	5	(Argentina) Roberto Battión		(substituted off) 46'
MF	7	(Argentina) Cristian Pellerano
MF	11	(Argentina) Osmar Ferreyra		(substituted off) 46'
FW	17	(Argentina) Facundo Parra
FW	19	(Colombia) Marco Pérez		(substituted off) 88'
Substitutes:
GK	21	(Argentina) Fabián Assmann
DF	23	(Uruguay) Adrián Argachá		(substituted in) 71'
DF	33	(Paraguay) Cristian Báez		(substituted in) 46'
MF	16	(Argentina) Nicolás Cabrera		(substituted in) 70'
MF	10	(Argentina) Patricio Rodríguez		(substituted in) 46'
FW	9	(Argentina) Leonel Núñez		(substituted in) 88'
FW	14	(Argentina) Matías Defederico
Manager:
(Argentina) Antonio Mohamed

Assistant referees:
Mu Yuxin (China P.R.)
Han Wei (China P.R.)
Fourth official:
Yudai Yamamoto (Japan)

Suruga Bank Championship
2011 Champion

Júbilo Iwata
First Title
