= 2010 Copa Sudamericana finals =

- Event: 2010 Copa Sudamericana
Goiás	Independiente
(Brazil)	(Argentina)
3	3
- On aggregate; Independiente won 5–3 on penalties

First leg
Goiás	Independiente
2	0
- Date: 1 December 2010
- Venue: Estádio Serra Dourada, Goiânia
- Referee: Carlos Torres (Paraguay)
- Attendance: 35,000

Second Leg
Independiente	Goiás
3	1
- After extra time
- Date: 8 December 2010
- Venue: Estadio Libertadores de América, Avellaneda
- Referee: Óscar Ruiz (Colombia)
- Attendance: 38,000

The 2010 Copa Sudamericana finals was the final two-legged tie that determined the 2010 Copa Sudamericana champion. It was played on 1 and 8 December 2010 between Brazilian club Goiás and Argentine club Independiente. The first leg, held in Estádio Serra Dourada in Goiánia, was won by Goiás 2–0 while the second leg, held in Estadio Libertadores de América in Avellaneda, Independiente was the winner 3–1.

As both teams were equaled on points and goal difference after 30 minutes of extra time, a penalty shoot-out was carried out to decide a winner. Independiente won 5–3 on penalties, therefore the club won their first Copa Sudamericana trophy.

== Qualified teams ==
Team	Previous finals app.
(Brazil) Goiás	None
(Argentina) Independiente	None

== Rules ==
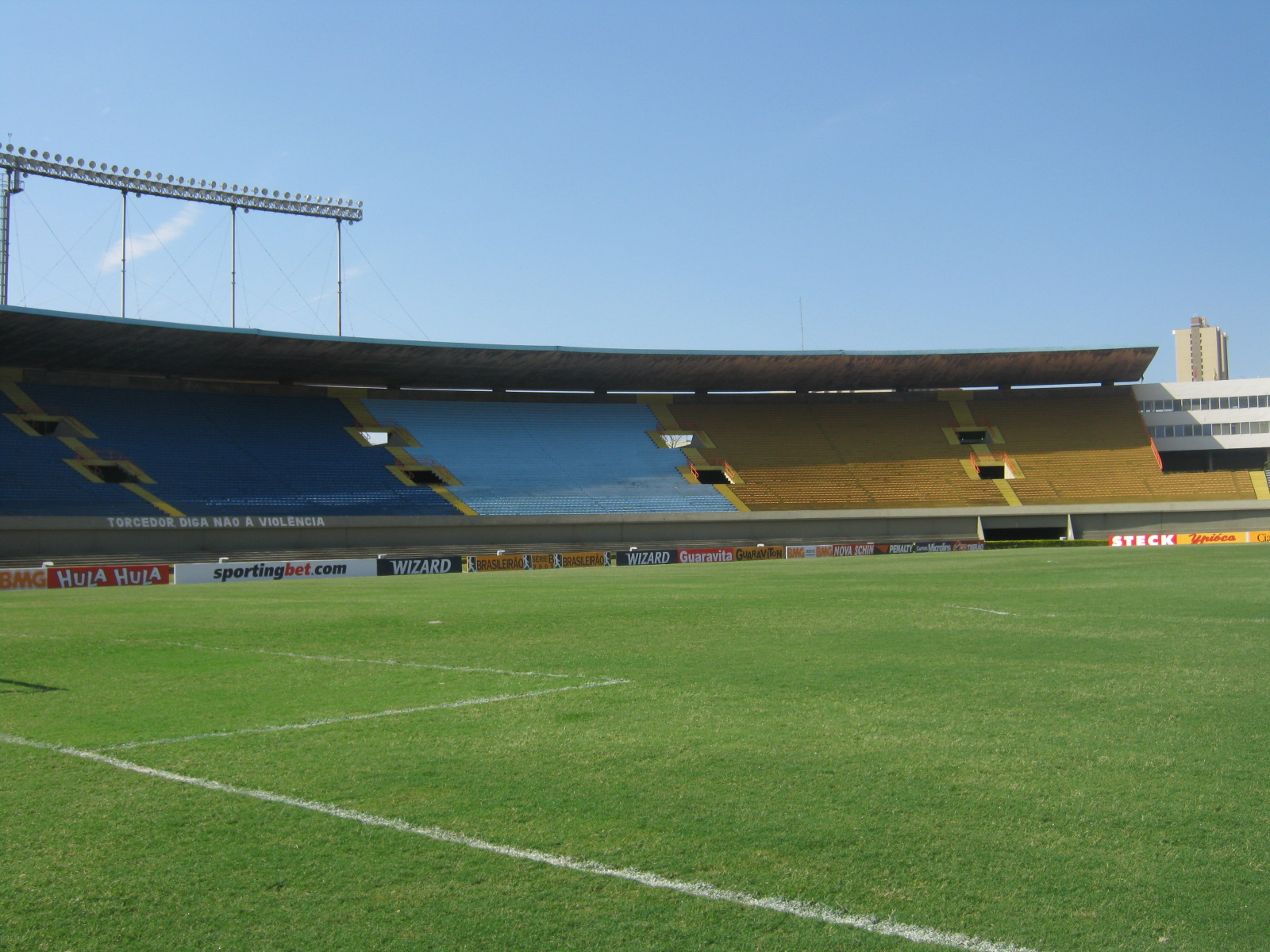
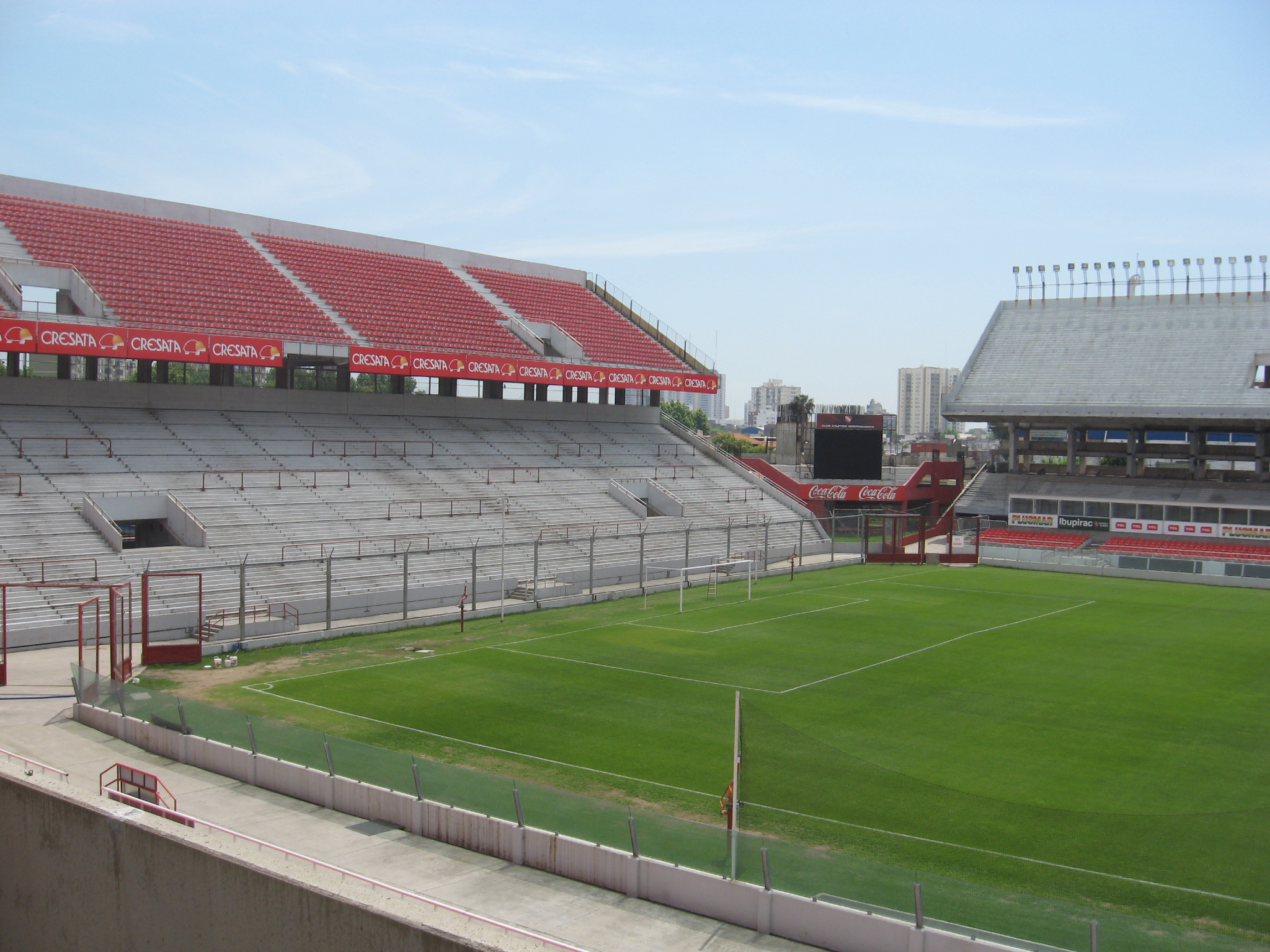
Estádio Serra Dourada (left) and Estadio Libertadores de América, venues for the series

The final was played over two legs; home and away. The higher seeded team played the second leg at home. The team that accumulated the most points —three for a win, one for a draw, zero for a loss— after the two legs was crowned the champion.

The away goals rule was not used on this occasion. After the two teams were tied on points after the second leg, the team with the best goal difference had won. If the two teams had equaled on goal difference, an extra time would have used. The extra time consisted of two 15-minute halves. In case the tie had not been broken, a penalty shoot-out would have ensued according to the Laws of the Game.

== Match details ==
=== First leg ===
2010 Copa Sudamericana finals
1 December 2010
22:00 UTC−02:00
First leg

Goiás (Brazil)	2–0	(Argentina) Independiente
Rafael Moura 14'; Otacílio Neto 22'	Report

Estádio Serra Dourada, Goiânia
Attendance: 35,000
Referee: Carlos Torres (Paraguay)

Goiás	Independiente

GK	1	(Brazil) Harlei
DF	20	(Brazil) Douglas
DF	4	(Brazil) Ernando
DF	3	(Brazil) Rafael Toloi
DF	19	(Brazil) Marcão
DF	6	(Brazil) Wellington Saci (c)
MF	8	(Brazil) Amaral
MF	17	(Brazil) Marcelo Costa		(substituted off) 88'
MF	2	(Brazil) Carlos Alberto	(yellow card) 87'
FW	9	(Brazil) Rafael Moura
FW	22	(Brazil) Otacílio Neto	(yellow card) 44'	(substituted off) 70'
Substitutes:
GK	24	(Brazil) Fábio
DF	5	(Brazil) Jadílson
DF	13	(Brazil) Valmir Lucas
DF	14	(Brazil) Wendel
MF	25	(Brazil) Lenon
FW	7	(Brazil) Éverton Santos		(substituted on) 70'
FW	11	(Brazil) Felipe		(substituted on) 88'
Manager:
(Brazil) Artur Neto

GK	1	(Argentina) Hilario Navarro
DF	2	(Argentina) Julián Velázquez	(yellow card) 10'
DF	6	(Argentina) Eduardo Tuzzio (c)
DF	24	(Argentina) Leonel Galeano	(yellow card) 12'
MF	16	(Argentina) Nicolás Cabrera		(substituted off) 80'
MF	5	(Argentina) Roberto Battión
MF	15	(Argentina) Fernando Godoy		(substituted off) 46'
MF	8	(Argentina) Hernán Fredes		(substituted off) 87'
MF	3	(Argentina) Lucas Mareque
FW	11	(Argentina) Andrés Silvera	(red card) 58'
FW	17	(Argentina) Facundo Parra
Substitutes:
GK	12	(Argentina) Adrián Gabbarini
DF	25	(Argentina) Carlos Matheu		(substituted on) 80'
DF	4	(Argentina) Maximiliano Velázquez		(substituted on) 87'
MF	7	(Argentina) Cristian Pellerano
MF	10	(Argentina) Patricio Rodríguez		(substituted on) 46'
MF	19	(Argentina) Leandro Gracián
MF	18	(Argentina) Nicolás Martínez
Manager:
(Argentina) Antonio Mohamed

=== Second leg ===
8 December 2010
21:10 UTC−03:00
Second leg

Independiente (Argentina)	3–1 (a.e.t.)	(Brazil) Goiás
J. Velázquez 19'; Parra 27', 35'	Report	Rafael Moura 22'
Penalties
M. Velázquez (penalty scored); Parra (penalty scored); Gracián (penalty scored); Matheu (penalty scored); Tuzzio (penalty scored)	5–3	(penalty scored) Toloi; (penalty scored) Éverton Santos; (penalty missed) Felipe; (penalty scored) Rafael Moura

Estadio Libertadores de América, Avellaneda
Referee: Óscar Ruiz (Colombia)

Independiente	Goiás

GK	1	(Argentina) Hilario Navarro	(yellow card) 114'
DF	25	(Argentina) Carlos Matheu	(yellow card) 25'
DF	3	(Argentina) Lucas Mareque
DF	6	(Argentina) Eduardo Tuzzio (c)	(yellow card) 12'
DF	2	(Argentina) Julián Velázquez	(yellow card) 43'
MF	5	(Argentina) Roberto Battión
MF	8	(Argentina) Hernán Fredes		(substituted off) 107'
MF	10	(Argentina) Patricio Rodríguez		(substituted off) 71'
MF	16	(Argentina) Nicolás Cabrera
FW	18	(Argentina) Nicolás Martínez		(substituted off) 65'
FW	17	(Argentina) Facundo Parra
Substitutes:
GK	12	(Argentina) Adrián Gabbarini
DF	4	(Argentina) Maximiliano Velázquez		(substituted on) 107'
DF	24	(Argentina) Leonel Galeano
MF	15	(Argentina) Fernando Godoy
MF	19	(Argentina) Leandro Gracián		(substituted on) 71'
FW	9	(Argentina) Germán Pacheco
FW	20	(Argentina) Martín Gómez		(substituted on) 65'
Manager:
(Argentina) Antonio Mohamed

GK	1	(Brazil) Harlei
DF	19	(Brazil) Marcão
DF	4	(Brazil) Ernando
DF	6	(Brazil) Wellington Saci (c)
DF	20	(Brazil) Douglas		(substituted off) 64'
DF	3	(Brazil) Rafael Toloi
MF	8	(Brazil) Amaral
MF	17	(Brazil) Marcelo Costa
MF	2	(Brazil) Carlos Alberto
FW	9	(Brazil) Rafael Moura	(yellow card) 114'
FW	22	(Brazil) Otacílio Neto	(yellow card) 11'	(substituted off) 75'
Substitutes:
GK	24	(Brazil) Fábio
DF	5	(Brazil) Jadílson
DF	13	(Brazil) Valmir Lucas
DF	14	(Brazil) Wendel
MF	25	(Brazil) Lenon
FW	7	(Brazil) Éverton Santos		(substituted on) 64'
FW	11	(Brazil) Felipe		(substituted on) 75'
Manager:
(Brazil) Artur Neto
