= Nicolás Cabrera =

Nicolas Cabrera may refer to:

- Nicolás Cabrera (physicist) (1913–1989), Spanish physicist
- Nicolás Cabrera (footballer) (born 1984), Argentine footballer
