= Glaydson =

Brazilian footballer (born 1979)

Personal information
- Full name: Glaydson Marcelino Freire
- Date of birth: 20 June 1979 (age 47)
- Place of birth: Contagem, Brazil
- Height: 1.78 m (5 ft 10 in)
- Position: Defensive midfielder

Youth career
- 1997–1999: Cruzeiro

Senior career*
Years	Team	Apps	(Gls)
1999	Cruzeiro		
2000	Athletico Paranaense		
2001	Francana		
2002	Vasco da Gama		
2003	Bragantino		
2004	Ipatinga		
2005	São Bento		
2005–2006	Paulista		
2007	Atlético Mineiro		
2007–2009	São Caetano		
2009–2012	Internacional	69	(2)
2012	→ Náutico (loan)	4	(0)
- * Club domestic league appearances and goals

Glaydson Marcelino Freire or simply Glaydson (born 20 June 1979), is a Brazilian former football defensive midfielder. He also played as a right back.

== Honours ==
Internacional

- Copa Libertadores: 2010
- Campeonato Gaúcho: 2011
- Recopa Sudamericana: 2011
