= Martín Zbrun =

Argentine footballer

Personal information
- Full name: Martín Juan Zbrun
- Date of birth: January 27, 1985 (age 41)
- Place of birth: Rafaela, Santa Fe, Argentina
- Height: 1.79 m (5 ft 10 in)
- Position: Left-back

Team information
- Current team: Ferrocarril del Estado

Youth career
- Ferrocarril del Estado
- Atlético Rafaela

Senior career*
| Years | Team | Apps | (Gls) |
| 2005–2014 | Atlético Rafaela | 232 | (6) |
| 2013 | → Instituto (loan) | 19 | (1) |
| 2014 | Santamarina | 15 | (1) |
| 2015 | Cobreloa | 5 | (0) |
| 2016 | Chacarita Juniors | 14 | (0) |
| 2016–2018 | Sportivo Belgrano | 48 | (1) |
| 2018–2020 | Cipolletti | 22 | (2) |
| 2020–2021 | Ben Hur | 7 | (0) |
| 2022– | Ferrocarril del Estado | 13 | (2) |
- * Club domestic league appearances and goals as of 11 December 2024

Martín Juan Zbrun (born January 27, 1985) is an Argentine football defender who plays for Ferrocarril del Estado.

== Teams ==
- (Argentina) Atlético Rafaela 2005–2012
- (Argentina) Instituto 2013
- (Argentina) Atlético Rafaela 2013–2014
- (Argentina) Santamarina 2014
- (Chile) Cobreloa 2015
- (Argentina) Chacarita Juniors 2016
- (Argentina) Sportivo Belgrano 2016–2018
- (Argentina) Cipolletti 2018–2020
- (Argentina) Ben Hur 2020–2021
- (Argentina) Ferrocarril del Estado 2022–Present

== Personal life ==
His twin brother, Matías, also was a footballer. They coincided in Ferrocarril del Estado.

== Honours ==
Atlético Rafaela

- Primera B Nacional (1): 2010–11
