= Fábio (footballer, born 1978) =

Brazilian footballer

Personal information
- Full name: Fábio Gonçalves dos Santos
- Date of birth: 19 September 1978 (age 48)
- Place of birth: ARIRANHA S/P, Brazil
- Height: 2.00 m (6 ft 6 1/2 in)
- Position: Goalkeeper

Youth career
- 2003: Osasco
- 2003: Inter Limeira
- 2004: Mogi Mirim
- 2005: ADAP
- 2005: Mogi Mirim

Senior career*
Years	Team	Apps	(Gls)
2006	ADAP	29	(0)
2006–2008	Marítimo	2	(0)
2008–2010	Americana Futebol	7	(0)
2008	→ Ponte Preta (loan)		
2009–2010	→ Portuguesa (loan)	18	(0)
2010	→ Goiás (loan)	3	(0)
2011	Oeste	0	(0)
2011	Criciúma	0	(0)
2011–	São Caetano	3	(0)
2013	→ Botafogo-SP (loan)		
- * Club domestic league appearances and goals

Fábio Gonçalves dos Santos, commonly known as Fábio (born 19 September 1978 in São José dos Campos, Brazil) is a Brazilian football goalkeeper, who last played for Botafogo-SP.

== Career ==
He was second choice behind fellow Brazilian Marcos after signing for Marítimo in 2006 from ADAP. Goiás officially signed the former Portuguesa's goalkeeper on 12 May 2010.
