= Matías Martínez =

Argentine footballer

Personal information
- Full name: Matías Alfredo Martínez
- Date of birth: March 24, 1988 (age 38)
- Place of birth: Resistencia, Argentina
- Height: 1.83 m (6 ft 0 in)
- Position: Centre back

Team information
- Current team: Atlético de Rafaela

Senior career*
Years	Team	Apps	(Gls)
2007–2013	Racing Club	113	(10)
2012–2013	→ Siena (loan)	0	(0)
2013	→ Argentinos (loan)	13	(3)
2013–2016	Lanús	12	(1)
2015–2016	→ Sporting Cristal (loan)	24	(0)
2016	Argentinos	5	(1)
2016–	Atlético de Rafaela	0	(0)
- * Club domestic league appearances and goals as of 30 June 2016

Matías Alfredo Martínez (born 24 March 1988 in Resistencia) is an Argentine football defender who plays for Atlético de Rafaela.

== Career ==
Martínez began his professional playing career with Racing Club de Avellaneda in 2007. He made his first league appearance on 8 December 2007 in a 1–0 home win against Colón in the Primera División.

During the Clausura 2009 tournament he scored 4 goals in 15 games, an impressive return for a defender.

During the summer of 2012, Martinez joined Serie A club Siena on a season-long loan.

During the summer of 2013 joined club Argentinos Juniors on a season-long loan.

== Honours ==
Lanús

- Copa Sudamericana: 2013
