= Fabián Monserrat =

Argentine footballer

Fabián Ariel Monserrat (born 25 June 1992 in Santa Fe, Argentina) is an Argentine professional footballer who plays as a midfielder for Talleres de Remedios de Escalada.
