= Leonel Galeano =

Argentine footballer (born 1991)

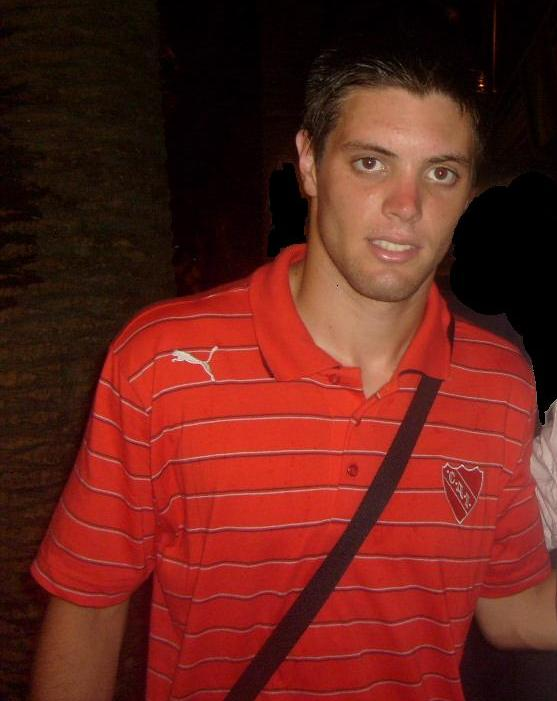

Personal information
- Date of birth: 2 August 1991 (age 35)
- Place of birth: Miramar, Argentina
- Height: 1.83 m (6 ft 0 in)
- Position: Centre back

Team information
- Current team: Atlanta

Senior career*
Years	Team	Apps	(Gls)
2009–2013	Independiente	96	(7)
2013–2014	Rayo Vallecano	7	(0)
2015–2019	Godoy Cruz	48	(0)
2019–2020	Aldosivi	44	(1)
2020	Aucas	0	(0)
2020–2021	Curicó Unido	25	(1)
2022–2024	Melgar	92	(7)
2025–2026	Cienciano	23	(0)
2026–	Atlanta	8	(2)

International career
2011	Argentina U-20	9	(0)
2010	Argentina	1	(0)
- * Club domestic league appearances and goals as of 16:24, 24 April 2026 (UTC)

Leonel Galeano (born 2 August 1991) is an Argentine footballer who plays as a central defender for Atlanta.

== Club career ==
Born in Miramar, Buenos Aires Province, Galeano graduated from Independiente's youth setup, and played his first match as a professional on 21 August 2009, starting in a 0–1 home loss against Newell's Old Boys. He scored his first goal for the club on 18 October, netting his side's only in a 1–1 draw with Chacarita Juniors.

Galeano appeared in 34 matches during his debut campaign, overtaking veterans Carlos Matheu and Gabriel Vallés. He also featured regularly during the Copa Sudamericana's winning campaign, appearing in nine matches and scoring once.

Galeano fell through the pecking order in the following campaigns, after the arrivals of Gabriel Milito and Claudio Morel. He appeared in 23 matches in 2012–13, as the Diablos were relegated.

On 31 July 2013, Galeano signed a one-year deal with La Liga side Rayo Vallecano. However, after a campaign marred by injuries, he was released by the Madrid side.

== International career ==
Galeano made his debut for the Argentina national team on 10 February 2010, in a 2–1 victory over Jamaica. The Argentina squad was formed exclusively by players of the Argentine league.

In 2011, Galeano was selected to play for the Argentina under-20 national football team the South American Youth Championship and, subsequently, the FIFA U-20 World Cup.

== Honours ==
Independiente

- Copa Sudamericana (1): 2010

Melgar

- Torneo Apertura (1): 2022
