= Harlei =

Brazilian footballer (born 1972)

Personal information
- Full name: Harlei de Menezes Silva
- Date of birth: March 30, 1972 (age 54)
- Place of birth: Belo Horizonte, Brazil
- Height: 1.82 m (6 ft 0 in)
- Position: Goalkeeper

Youth career
- 1990–1991: Cruzeiro

Senior career*
Years	Team	Apps	(Gls)
1992–1997	Cruzeiro		
1998	Comercial		
1998–1999	Vila Nova		
1999–2014	Goiás	347	(0)
- * Club domestic league appearances and goals

Harlei de Menezes Silva or simply Harlei (born March 30, 1972), is a Brazilian former professional who played as a goalkeeper. He spent most of his career with Goiás.

Harlei has also reached the milestone of 600 games for Goiás and has helped them avoid relegation in the 2007 season by just one point after defeating Internacional 2–1 on the final day.

On 11 December 2014, Harlei retired, becoming Goiás' new director of football.

== Honours ==
Cruzeiro

- Copa Libertadores: 1997

Goiás

- Brazilian League (2nd division): 1999, 2012
- Brazilian Center-West Cup: 2000, 2001, 2002
- Goiás State League: 2000, 2002, 2003, 2006, 2009, 2012, 2013
