= Nicolás Delmonte =

Argentine footballer (born 1989)

Nico Delmonte
Personal information
- Full name: Nicolás Delmonte
- Date of birth: 10 May 1989 (age 37)
- Place of birth: Oliva, Argentina
- Height: 1.80 m (5 ft 11 in)
- Position: Centre back

Team information
- Current team: Juventud Torremolinos
- Number: 18

Youth career
- –2009: Independiente

Senior career*
Years	Team	Apps	(Gls)
2009–2013	Independiente	15	(0)
2009–2010	→ Dinamo Tirana (loan)	24	(0)
2012–2013	→ Instituto (loan)	11	(0)
2014–2015	Johor Darul Ta'zim II	49	(10)
2016	Estudiantes San Luis	14	(1)
2016–2017	Marbella	33	(3)
2018–2019	Extremadura	13	(0)
2018–2019	→ Sabadell (loan)	32	(0)
2019–2020	Bashundhara Kings	5	(1)
2021	Zamora	12	(0)
2021	Melilla	10	(1)
2022–2023	Linense	53	(1)
2023	Fasano	4	(0)
2024	Zamora	21	(0)
2024–2025	Juventud Torremolinos	13	(0)
2025–2026	Kannur Warriors	10	(0)
2026–	Juventud Torremolinos	1	(0)
- * Club domestic league appearances and goals as of 1 February 2026

Nicolás "Nico" Delmonte (born 10 May 1989) is an Argentine footballer who plays as a central defender for Spanish Primera Federación club Juventud Torremolinos.

== Career ==
Delmonte was loaned to Albanian club Dinamo Tirana in 2009.
