= Valmir Lucas =

Brazilian footballer

Personal information
- Full name: Valmir Lucas de Oliveira
- Date of birth: 12 January 1989 (age 37)
- Place of birth: Edéia, Brazil
- Height: 1.85 m (6 ft 1 in)
- Position: Centre back

Team information
- Current team: Goiás

Youth career
- –2009: Goiás

Senior career*
Years	Team	Apps	(Gls)
2009–2016	Goiás	156	(3)
- * Club domestic league appearances and goals

Valmir Lucas de Oliveira (born 12 January 1989), known as Valmir Lucas is a Brazilian former football centre back.

== Career ==
Revealed in the basic categories of Goiás, in the first team currently plays in the club, plays in the Goiás.

=== Career statistics ===
(Correct as of October 16, 2010)

Club	Season	State League		Brazilian Série A		Copa do Brasil		Copa Sudamericana		Total	
Club	Season	Apps	Goals	Apps	Goals	Apps	Goals	Apps	Goals	Apps	Goals
Goiás	2009	-	-	14	0	-	-	?	?	?	?
Goiás	2010	?	?	20	0	?	?	2	0	?	?
Total		?	?	34	0	?	?	?	?	?	?

== Contract ==
- Goiás.
