= Jorge Iván Pérez =

Argentine footballer

Iván Pérez
Personal information
- Full name: Jorge Pérez
- Date of birth: 23 May 1990 (age 36)
- Place of birth: Tandil, Argentina
- Height: 1.75 m (5 ft 9 in)
- Position: Midfielder

Youth career
- Independiente

Senior career*
Years	Team	Apps	(Gls)
2008–2014	Independiente	23	(3)
2012–2013	→ Banfield (loan)	33	(3)
2013–2014	→ San Martín SJ (loan)	24	(1)
2015–2017	Freamunde	55	(5)
2017–2018	Aldosivi	11	(0)
2018–2019	Santamarina	23	(0)
2020–2021	Cibao	15	(2)
2022	Jarabacoa		
- * Club domestic league appearances and goals as of 00:05, 4 July 2019 (UTC)

Jorge Iván Pérez (born 23 May 1990 in Tandil, Buenos Aires) is an Argentine footballer who played as a midfielder. His career finished in June 2022 after an ACL injury.

== Career ==
Pérez did all his training at Independiente's youth academy. His first professional game was a 2–0 loss against Rosario Central in 2008 when he was only 17 years old of age. He was part of the winning squad that won the Copa Sudamericana 2010.

On April 8, 2011, he scored his first career goal in a 3–0 win against Godoy Cruz Antonio Tomba. In the 2011 Apertura he scored 2 great goals, one was against All Boys, hitting the ball from outside the box and another goal to Olimpo de Bahia Blanca on a 3 -0 win.

== Honours ==
Title	Club	Country	Year
Copa Sudamericana	Club Atlético Independiente	Argentina	2011
