= Fernando Godoy =

Argentine footballer

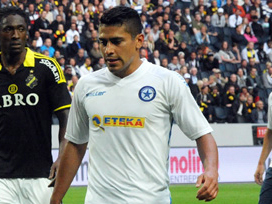
- Godoy during a match with Atromitos in 2015.

Personal information
- Full name: Fernando Gabriel Godoy
- Date of birth: 1 May 1990 (age 36)
- Place of birth: Buenos Aires, Argentina
- Height: 1.72 m (5 ft 8 in)
- Position: Midfielder

Team information
- Current team: Güemes

Youth career
- Independiente

Senior career*
| Years | Team | Apps | (Gls) |
| 2009–2013 | Independiente | 72 | (2) |
| 2013–2015 | Panetolikos | 59 | (0) |
| 2015–2016 | Atromitos | 14 | (0) |
| 2016–2017 | Godoy Cruz | 14 | (0) |
| 2016–2018 | Talleres de Córdoba | 36 | (0) |
| 2018–2019 | Aldosivi | 14 | (0) |
| 2020–2021 | Curicó Unido | 33 | (0) |
| 2021–2022 | Sol de América | 23 | (0) |
| 2022–2023 | Huracán | 15 | (0) |
| 2024–2025 | Sarmiento | 16 | (1) |
| 2025–2026 | Carlos Mannucci | 18 | (0) |
| 2026– | Güemes | 8 | (0) |
- * Club domestic league appearances and goals as of 17:02, 29 April 2026 (UTC)

Fernando Gabriel Godoy (born 1 May 1990) is an Argentine professional footballer who as a midfielder for Güemes.

== Career ==
Fernando Godoy came having graduated through the youth academy of Independiente and making his first-team debut in 2009. In 2010, he gradually began to earn a spot as a starter in the team. He ended the season with Independiente positively by winning the 2010 Copa Sudamericana, starting in six games. During the 2012 Torneo Clausura he remained continuously as a reserve under the instructions of coach Christian Díaz. On 19 May 2013, in a match against San Martín de San Juan, he scored his first goal in professional football.

From 2013 to 2015, he played as a midfielder for Panetolikos of the Super League Greece, having 63 appearances in all competitions with the club. He joined another Super League team, Atromitos, in 2015.
