= Brian Nieva =

Argentine footballer

Personal information
- Full name: Brian Emanuel Nieva
- Date of birth: 18 April 1990 (age 36)
- Place of birth: Avellaneda, Argentina
- Height: 1.77 m (5 ft 10 in)
- Position: Forward

Senior career*
Years	Team	Apps	(Gls)
2010–2014	Independiente	13	(1)
2012–2013	→ Los Andes (loan)	20	(2)
2013–2014	→ Santiago Morning (loan)	11	(3)
2014	Comunicaciones	9	(1)
2014	JJ Urquiza	14	(4)
2015	Huracán de Goya	5	(3)
2016	Pacífico	8	(1)
2017–2018	El Porvenir	9	(0)
- * Club domestic league appearances and goals as of 3 April 2020

Brian Emanuel Nieva (born 18 April 1990) was an Argentine footballer.

He played for J.J. de Urquiza in the Primera C in Argentine.
