= Facundo Parra =

Argentine footballer

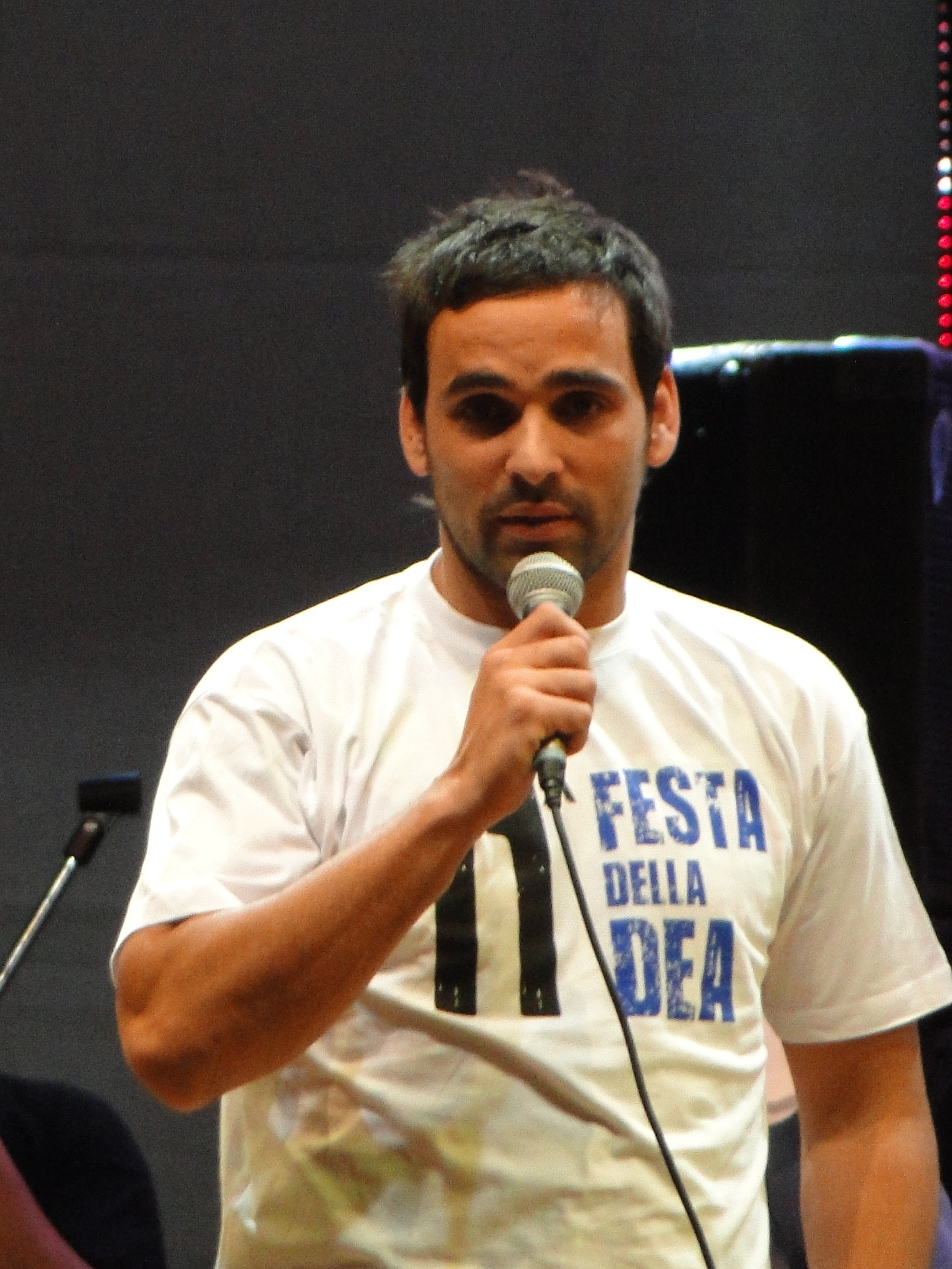

Personal information
- Full name: Facundo Manuel Carlos Parra
- Date of birth: June 15, 1985 (age 41)
- Place of birth: Buenos Aires, Argentina
- Height: 1.84 m (6 ft 0 in)
- Position: Centre forward

Team information
- Current team: Chacarita Juniors

Youth career
- Chacarita Juniors

Senior career*
Years	Team	Apps	(Gls)
2004–2012	Chacarita Juniors	128	(37)
2007–2009	→ AEL (loan)	58	(11)
2010–2012	→ Independiente (loan)	64	(16)
2012–2013	Atalanta	14	(0)
2013–2014	Independiente	29	(9)
2014–2015	Asteras Tripolis	25	(5)
2015–2016	Atlético de Rafaela	17	(2)
2016–2017	Santa Cruz	2	(0)
2017–2018	Agropecuario	19	(2)
2018	3 de Febrero	21	(7)
2019	Nacional Asunción	14	(3)
2019–2020	All Boys	19	(6)
2020	Carlos Stein	19	(4)
2021	Guaireña	24	(3)
2022–	Chacarita Juniors	11	(2)

International career
2005	Argentina U20	10	(3)
- * Club domestic league appearances and goals as of 16:35, 11 July 2022 (UTC)

Facundo Manuel Carlos Parra (born 15 June 1985) is an Argentine football striker who plays for Chacarita Juniors in the Argentinian Primera B Nacional.

== Club career ==
Parra started his career in Chacarita Juniors where he played for four years. But he started to become known by playing to Independiente. For the 2010–11 season, Parra joined Independiente on loan. He scored his first goal with the club in a 1–3 defeat to All Boys for the 11th fixture of the Apertura. He scored his second goal for the team in the Copa Sudamericana semifinals victory over LDU Quito, and dedicated it to his dog Max. He then scored two more goals in the competition's final return leg against Goiás (3–1), leading his team to the penalty shootout in which they defeated their rival to win the trophy. During 2010-2012 he played 81 games with Independiente scoring 19 goals and giving 8 assists.

In summer 2014, searching team after a modest season in the ranks of the Independiente (29 games played, 9 goals) Argentine forward Facundo Parra is packing direction to Greek Super League to defend the colors of Asteras Tripolis, making the third step in Europe after playing between 2007 and 2009 for AEL (64 games played, 13 goals) on a loan from Chacarita Juniors and Atalanta in 2012-2013 (16 games played, 2 goals), playing along Maximiliano Moralez, Germán Denis, Ezequiel Schelotto and Carlos Matheu. However, his arrival at the Greek club left a trail of controversy, as a few hours ago everything was ready to sign with Club Atlético Belgrano, a club where Parra negotiating for days. But this never happened, as the player did not respond during the last hours to either call from the president of the Argentine club or his agent Daniel dos Reis, who was conducting the negotiations and showed his discomfort by the way the player and his environment acted in this deal.

== Honours ==
- 2010 Copa Sudamericana: Independiente
