= Fabián Assmann =

Argentine footballer (born 1986)

Personal information
- Full name: Walter Fabián Assmann
- Date of birth: March 23, 1986 (age 40)
- Place of birth: Zárate, Argentina
- Height: 1.87 m (6 ft 2 in)
- Position: Goalkeeper

Youth career
- Independiente

Senior career*
Years	Team	Apps	(Gls)
2007–2014	Independiente	107	(0)
2009–2010	→ Las Palmas (loan)	22	(0)
2014–2015	Venados F.C.	11	(0)
2015–2016	Quilmes	10	(0)
2016–2017	Vélez Sarsfield	16	(0)
2017–2018	Agropecuario	5	(0)
2018–2021	Aldosivi	6	(0)
2022	Defensores Belgrano	4	(0)
- * Club domestic league appearances and goals as of 21:04 28 June 2023 (UTC)

Walter Fabián Assmann (born 23 March 1986) is an Argentine professional footballer who plays as a goalkeeper.

== Career ==
Born in Zárate, Assmann made his debut on 21 April 2007, and played two more games in the 2007 Clasura competition. For the 2007 Apertura competition he wears the number 1 shirt, inheriting the starting goalkeeper position from Oscar Ustari, who left Independiente for Spanish La Liga side Getafe CF at the start of the 2007–08 season.

In August 2009, he was loaned to Spanish club UD Las Palmas. The Argentine goalkeeper returned to Independiente in July 2010.

Assmann later joined Mexican club Venados F.C. after six years in total with Independiente. The Argentine only stayed in Mexico for six months however, making 12 appearances with Venados.

In January 2015 Assmann joined Argentine club Quilmes, staying at the club for one year, racking up 10 appearances.

After his one-year stint in Quilmes, Assmann joined Vélez Sarsfield. He stayed at the José Amalfitani Stadium for 18 months before transferring to fellow Buenos Aires club, Agropecuario where he stayed for just under a year, only making five appearances.

In 2018 Assmann joined Aldosivi, staying at the club for three years but only making a total of five appearances for the Buenos Aires club.

Staying in Buenos Aires, Assmann joined Defensores de Belgrano in January 2022 where he made four appearances for Defe before retiring from the sport later on in the year.

== Honours ==
Independiente

- Copa Sudamericana: 2010
