= Leonel Núñez =

Argentine footballer (born 1984)

Personal information
- Full name: Leonel Jorge Núñez
- Date of birth: 13 October 1984 (age 42)
- Place of birth: Buenos Aires, Argentina
- Height: 1.85 m (6 ft 1 in)
- Position: Forward

Youth career
- 2002–2003: Argentinos Juniors

Senior career*
Years	Team	Apps	(Gls)
2004–2007	Argentinos Juniors	63	(17)
2007–2008	Olympiacos	18	(2)
2008–2010	Independiente	55	(18)
2010	Bursaspor	13	(6)
2011–2012	Independiente	22	(4)
2012–2013	Argentinos Juniors	18	(2)
2013–2014	Johor Darul Ta'zim	17	(11)
2014	OFI	15	(7)
2015	Mushuc Runa	4	(0)
2017	PS TNI	10	(10)
2018	Nueva Chicago	5	(0)
Total		240	(77)
- * Club domestic league appearances and goals

Leonel Jorge Núñez (born 13 October 1984) is an Argentine former footballer who last played as a forward for Nueva Chicago.

== Career ==
=== Argentinos Juniors ===
From 2004 to 2007, Núñez played for Argentinos Juniors in the Argentine Primera División. He finished the 2006 Apertura tournament with 8 goals, and was in the top ten goalscorers. During the Clausura tournament 2007, he scored one of the goals of the season from his own half against Belgrano de Córdoba. His goals helped Argentinos Juniors move away from the bottom four in the Primera División relegation table for the first time in nearly three years. The young striker attracted a lot of attention from many big European clubs during his time in Argentina due to his prolific goal-scoring ratio.

=== Olympiacos ===
In June 2007, Núñez signed with Greek club Olympiacos for €3 million, as reported. He agreed personal terms for a four-year contract worth €500,000 a season.

Núñez scored his first goal for Olympiacos in a pre-season friendly against Turkish club Ankaragücü. On 16 January 2008, Núñez scored his first official goal for Olympiacos. It was a brilliant scissor kick to make it 4–0 in the Greek cup derby match against Panathinaikos. Núñez recorded his first league goal, essentially a decider, shortly afterwards in the game against OFI. With Olympiacos, he won the Greek Super League, the Greek Cup as well as the Greek Super Cup.

=== Club Atlético Independiente ===
In 2008, Núñez was signed by Independiente. His terrific displays and his contribution of seven goals in his first tournament were not enough to prevent Independiente from finishing in 18th place, however. On 9 May 2010, Nuñez scored a goal directly from the corner against his former team Argentinos Juniors.

=== Bursaspor ===
On 1 August 2010, he signed with Turkish champions Bursaspor on a 2+1 one-year deal for an undisclosed fee.

=== Johor Darul Takzim ===
He made his debut against Selangor FA by replacing Nurul Azwan Roya when Johor Darul Takzim trailed by 1–0 in the second leg of Malaysia FA Cup quarter-final and subsequently helped Johor DT by scoring 2 goals to complete the comeback to bring the match to a penalty shootout. He was one of the penalty kickers and succeeded, which brought Johor DT to the Malaysia FA Cup semi-final against Pahang FA with a 4–2 win against Selangor FA through the penalty shootout. His third goal for Johor Darul Takzim was scored when Johor Darul Takzim won against Pahang 1–0 in a subsequent league match.

=== OFI ===
On 12 February 2014, he signed a contract with OFI.

=== PS TNI ===
On 1 March 2017. Núñez signed a contract with PS TNI. He has scored 5 goals for the club.
