= Osmar Ferreyra =

Argentine footballer (born 1983)

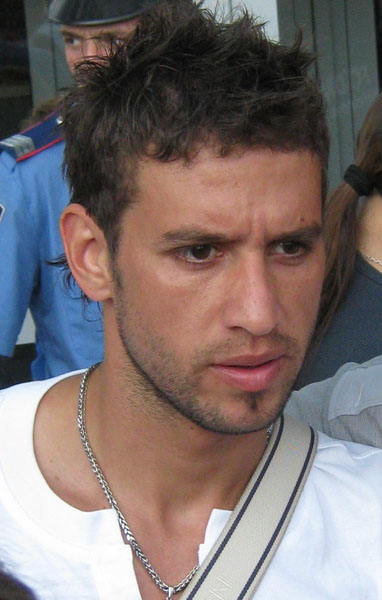
- Ferreyra with Dnipro Dnipropetrovsk in July 2009

Personal information
- Full name: Osmar Daniel Ferreyra
- Date of birth: 9 January 1983 (age 43)
- Place of birth: Basavilbaso, Entre Ríos, Argentina
- Height: 1.76 m (5 ft 9 in)
- Position: Left winger

Senior career*
Years	Team	Apps	(Gls)
2003	River Plate	11	(2)
2004–2005	CSKA Moscow	15	(2)
2005	→ PSV Eindhoven (loan)	1	(0)
2005–2007	San Lorenzo	61	(9)
2008–2011	Dnipro Dnipropetrovsk	62	(5)
2011–2013	Independiente	65	(6)
2013–2015	River Plate	30	(0)
2015	Atlético Rafaela	23	(8)
2016	Panetolikos	20	(1)
2017–2018	Boca Unidos	39	(8)
Total		327	(41)

International career
2003	Argentina U20		
2004	Argentina U23	6	(3)
- * Club domestic league appearances and goals

Osmar Daniel ''Malevo'' Ferreyra (born 9 January 1983) is an Argentine former professional footballer who played as a midfielder.

== Club career ==
Ferreyra started his career with River Plate. He was signed by PFC CSKA Moscow in January 2004 and was part of the team that won the 2004–05 UEFA Cup, being on the bench for the final. In June 2005, he joined PSV Eindhoven on loan, but he returned to CSKA in December 2005. In 2006, he joined San Lorenzo, where he helped the team to win the 2007 Clausura.

In January 2008, he moved to Dnipro Dnipropetrovsk.

In July 2011, he signed a three-year deal with Independiente, back in his native country.

On 2 July 2013, Ferreyra was confirmed as a new River Plate player, club where he made his debut under the same coach who called him again, Ramón Díaz. He signed for two years.

In March 2015, he joined Atlético Rafaela on loan for six months.

In January 2016, he signed an 18-month contract with Panetolikos F.C. On 24 December 2016, Panetolikos and Ferreyra parted ways.

== International career ==
Ferreyra was capped for the Argentina Under-20 team during the 2003 FIFA World Youth Championship. He also played for the Argentina Olympic team.

== Honours ==
CSKA Moscow

- Russian Premier League: 2005
- UEFA Cup: 2005

PSV Eindhoven

- Eredivisie: 2004–05

San Lorenzo

- Argentine Primera División: 2007 Clausura

River Plate

- Argentine Primera División: Torneo Final 2014
- Copa Sudamericana: 2014

Argentina

- Pan American Games: 2003
- CONMEBOL Pre-Olympic Tournament: 2004
