= Iván Vélez =

Colombian footballer (born 1984)

Personal information
- Full name: José Iván Vélez Castillo
- Date of birth: August 16, 1984 (age 42)
- Place of birth: Palmira, Valle del Cauca, Colombia
- Height: 1.73 m (5 ft 8 in)
- Position: Full back

Team information
- Current team: América de Cali
- Number: 13

Youth career
- América de Cali

Senior career*
Years	Team	Apps	(Gls)
2004–2007	Deportes Quindío	118	(9)
2007–2009	América de Cali	88	(2)
2010	Once Caldas	34	(3)
2011	→ Independiente (loan)	15	(0)
2012–2016	Junior	95	(6)
2017–	América de Cali	4	(0)

International career
2009–2010	Colombia	3	(0)
- * Club domestic league appearances and goals as of 20 February 2017

José Iván Vélez Castillo (born August 16, 1984) is a Colombian footballer who plays as a full back for Categoría Primera A club América de Cali.

== International career ==
Vélez debuted with the Colombia national team in 2009.
