= Cristian Báez =

Paraguayan football player (born 1990)

Personal information
- Full name: Cristian Javier Báez
- Date of birth: 9 April 1990 (age 36)
- Place of birth: San Lorenzo, Paraguay
- Height: 1.80 m (5 ft 11 in)
- Position: Centre-back

Team information
- Current team: Junior de Barranquilla
- Number: 66

Youth career
- Independiente

Senior career*
Years	Team	Apps	(Gls)
2010–2015	Independiente	10	(1)
2012–2013	→ Instituto (loan)	25	(0)
2013–2014	→ Defensa y Justicia (loan)	38	(1)
2014–2015	→ Deportes Iquique (loan)	19	(0)
2016	Universidad San Martín	24	(0)
2017	Dorados de Sinaloa	17	(0)
2017–2018	Godoy Cruz	14	(0)
2018–2019	Dorados de Sinaloa	36	(4)
2019–2020	Guaraní	51	(6)
2021	Libertad	25	(4)
2022	Rosario Central	30	(2)
2023	Independiente	36	(1)
2024	Cerro Porteño	27	(2)
2025–	Atlético Junior	20	(1)
- * Club domestic league appearances and goals as of 14 September 2024

Cristian Javier Báez (born 9 April 1990) is a Paraguayan professional footballer who plays as a centre-back for Atlético Junior.

== Titles ==
- Independiente 2010 (Copa Sudamericana)
