= Patito Rodríguez =

Argentine footballer (born 1990)

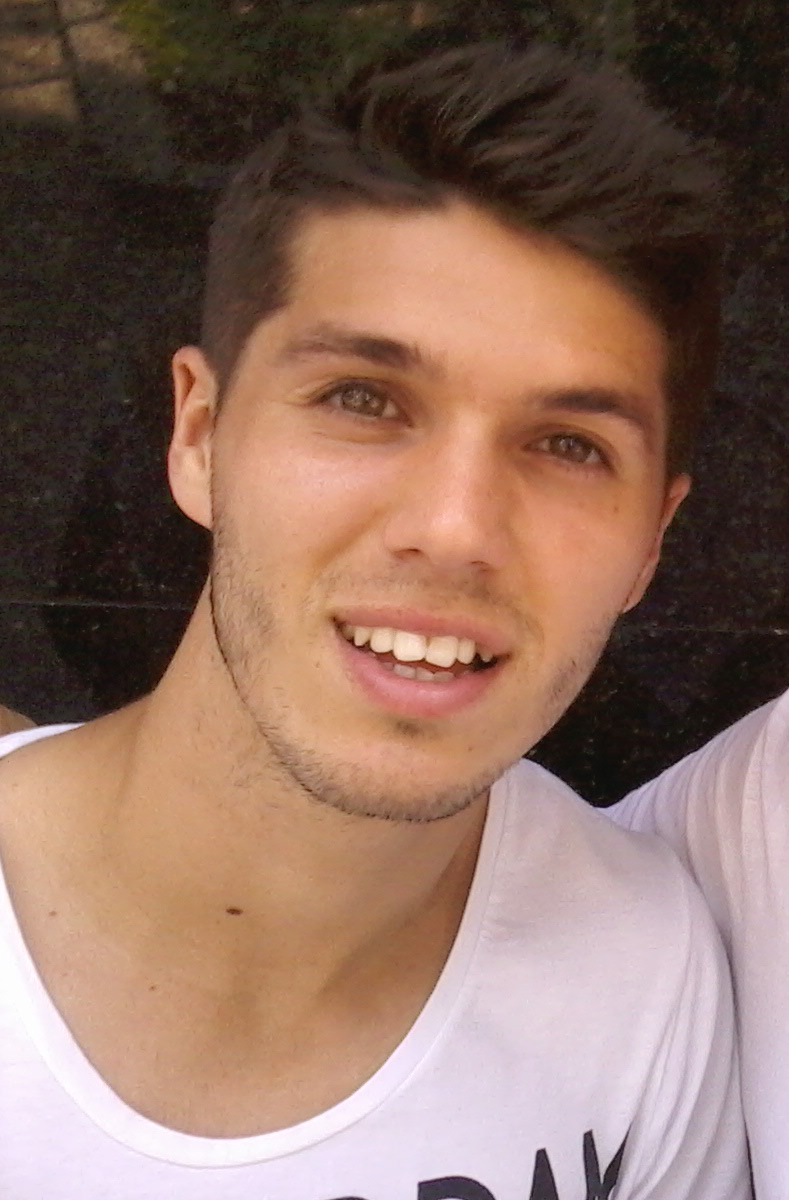
- Rodríguez in 2012

Personal information
- Full name: Patricio Julián Rodríguez
- Date of birth: 4 May 1990 (age 36)
- Place of birth: Quilmes, Argentina
- Height: 1.72 m (5 ft 8 in)
- Positions: Left winger; forward

Team information
- Current team: Bolívar
- Number: 17

Youth career
- 2000–2007: Independiente

Senior career*
Years	Team	Apps	(Gls)
2008–2012	Independiente	95	(9)
2012–2016	Santos	28	(2)
2013–2014	→ Estudiantes (loan)	27	(2)
2015	→ Johor Darul Ta'zim (loan)	7	(1)
2016–2018	AEK Athens	26	(3)
2018	Newcastle Jets	12	(1)
2018–2019	Moreirense	12	(0)
2020–2021	Wilstermann	26	(11)
2022–	Bolívar	107	(25)
- * Club domestic league appearances and goals as of 30 December 2025

Patricio Julián Rodríguez (Latin American Spanish: [paˈtɾisjo xuˈljan roˈðɾiɣes]; born 4 May 1990), sometimes referred as Pato Rodríguez [ˈpato-] or Patito [paˈtito], is an Argentine professional footballer who plays for Bolivian Primera División club Bolívar.

== Career ==
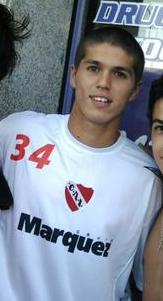
Rodríguez with Independiente in 2008.

=== Independiente ===
Born in Quilmes, Rodríguez began his career on Independiente, joining the club's youth categories in 2000, aged 10. On 10 February 2008, he made his first team debut, in a 0–1 loss against Lanús. On 15 March, he provided an assist for Germán Denis' goal in a 3–1 win against Gimnasia La Plata. On 5 April, he was handed his first start, in a 1–3 loss against Colón.

On 30 August 2009, Rodríguez scored his first and second professional goals, against Atlético Tucumán.

=== Santos ===
On 20 July 2012, Rodríguez signed a four-year contract with Brazilian Série A club Santos. On 11 August, he made his debut for Peixe, scoring the first goal in a 2–2 draw against Atlético-GO.

On 31 July 2013, Rodríguez signed with Estudiantes de La Plata, in a season-long loan deal. He returned to Santos in the 2014 summer, but was sparingly used.

On 19 February 2015, Rodríguez was loaned to Johor Darul Ta'zim until November.

=== AEK Athens ===
On 20 July 2016, Rodríguez signed a two-year contract with Greek side AEK Athens, with an annual salary of €500,000. He made his official debut against Xanthi, providing his teammates with 2 assists and helping his team secure a comfortable 4–1 win.

On 14 October 2016, AEK's winger was suspended with a three-match ban for his unprofessional behavior against Diogo Figueiras in a 3–0 away loss in the derby clash against Olympiakos. On 5 November 2016, he scored his first goal in a 2–2 home draw against Atromitos. On 10 December 2016, he scored in a 4–0 win against Levadiakos. On 13 April 2017 Patito scored the winning goal in a 2–1 Greek Cup semifinals first leg away win against champions Olympiacos. Despite the rumours from the beginning of 2017–18 season, it was reported Rodríguez would remain a member of AEK until the end of the season, when his current contract with the historic club expires. Eventually on 8 December 2017, he released from the club by mutual consent.

=== Newcastle Jets ===
On 22 December 2017, Newcastle Jets announced signing Rodríguez as an injury replacement in the January transfer window, replacing their injured marquee Ronald Vargas. He scored on his debut for Newcastle Jets in a 2–0 win over rivals Central Coast Mariners. Following Vargas's recovery from injury and re-signing with Newcastle Jets, the club announced Rodríguez's release on 16 May 2018.

== Career statistics ==
As of 25 May 2018

Appearances and goals by club, season and competition
Club	Season	League			Cup		Continental		Other		Total	
Club	Season	Division	Apps	Goals	Apps	Goals	Apps	Goals	Apps	Goals	Apps	Goals
Independiente	2007–08	Primera División	8	0	—		—		—		8	5
Independiente	2008–09	Primera División	10	0	—		—		—		10	5
Independiente	2009–10	Primera División	28	2	—		—		—		28	2
Independiente	2010–11	Primera División	28	4	—		16 (Note: Eight appearances in the Copa Sudamericana, eight in the Copa Libertadores)	1	—		44	5
Independiente	2011–12	Primera División	21	3	—		1 (Note: Appearance in the Copa Sudamericana)	0	1 (Note: Appearance in the Suruga Bank Championship)	0	23	3
Independiente	Subtotal		95	9	0	0	17	1	1	0	113	10
Santos	2012	Série A	20	2	—		2 (Note: Appearances in the Recopa Sudamericana)	0	—		22	2
Santos	2013	Série A	2	0	3	0	0	0	11 (Note: Appearances in the Campeonato Paulista)	0	16	0
Santos	2014	Série A	6	0	1	0	0	0	0	0	7	0
Santos	2015	Série A	0	0	0	0	0	0	0	0	0	0
Santos	2016	Série A	0	0	0	0	0	0	6	0	6	0
Santos	Subtotal		28	2	4	0	2	0	17	0	51	2
Estudiantes (loan)	2012–13	Primera División	—		1	0	—		—		1	0
Estudiantes (loan)	2013–14	Primera División	27	2	—		—		—		27	2
Johor (loan)	2015	Malaysia Super League	7	1	—		0	0	0	0	7	1
AEK Athens	2016–17	Super League Greece	24	3	6	1	0	0	—		30	4
AEK Athens	2017–18	Super League Greece	2	0	1	0	2 (Note: One appearance in the Champions League, one appearance in Europa League)	0	—		5	0
AEK Athens	AEK total		26	3	7	1	2	0	0	0	35	4
Newcastle Jets	2017–18	A-League	12	1	—		–		—		12	1
Moreirense	2018–19	Primeira Liga	1	0	—		–		—		1	0
Career total			196	18	12	1	21	1	18	0	247	20

== Honours ==
Independiente

- Copa Sudamericana: 2010

Santos

- Recopa Sudamericana: 2012
- Campeonato Paulista: 2016
