= Matías Defederico =

Argentine footballer (born 1989)

Personal information
- Full name: Matías Adrián Defederico
- Date of birth: 23 August 1989 (age 37)
- Place of birth: Buenos Aires, Argentina
- Height: 1.69 m (5 ft 7 in)
- Positions: Winger; forward

Team information
- Current team: Agropecuario

Youth career
- 2005–2007: Huracán

Senior career*
Years	Team	Apps	(Gls)
2007–2009	Huracán	35	(6)
2009–2013	Corinthians	30	(3)
2011–2012	→ Independiente (loan)	22	(1)
2012–2013	→ Huracán (loan)	14	(3)
2013–2014	Huracán	28	(4)
2014	Al Dhafra	3	(0)
2015	Nueva Chicago	11	(0)
2015	Eskişehirspor	11	(0)
2016	San Marcos de Arica	11	(1)
2016–2017	Mumbai City	14	(3)
2017–2018	Universidad Católica	32	(3)
2018	Lorca	0	(0)
2018–2019	Apollon Smyrnis	14	(0)
2019–	Agropecuario	0	(0)

International career
2009–2011	Argentina	2	(1)
- * Club domestic league appearances and goals

Matías Adrián Defederico (born 23 August 1989 in Buenos Aires) is an Argentine football winger who currently plays for Club Agropecuario Argentino. Defederico is a fast, left-footed player with very good dribbling ability.

His surname was usually spelt as "De Federico". He declared to FourFourTwo Brasil that it must not be written separated.

== Playing career ==
=== Huracán ===
His professional debut for Huracán was on 18 August 2007 in a 0–0 home draw with Tigre. From then on he played alternately between the reserve and first team until the arrival of Angel Cappa who gave him confidence and on the last date of the Apertura 2008, Defederico scored his first goal to open the scoring against Velez Sarsfield in Huracan's 3–0 victory at home. In the Clausura 2009 championship De Federico established himself as a regular first team player for the club under the management of Ángel Cappa. Defederico and teammate Javier Pastore formed part of an attacking formation that was described as fantastic by the Argentine press.

=== Corinthians ===
He was subsequently linked to Corinthians for $4 (US) million and was signed by them. Defederico had a weak performance with Corinthians, more specifically the directors of the club considering him physically weak. After many rumours, Andrés Sanchez, the Corinthians president, offered him to Independiente on loan for one year.

=== Independiente ===
Finally on 30 December 2010 he signed for Club Atletico Independiente arriving on loan for one year without purchase option. After 6 months full of individual glory, despite multiple injuries which did not allow him to play many minutes, Independiente decided to rescind his loan 6 months ahead of schedule, if any club was interested. Colo-Colo was interested in hiring, but negotiations then cooled since Defederico once again came in the plans of Independiente coach Antonio Mohamed for the second half of the season.

On 20 March 2012 coach Christian Diaz decided to demote 6 players to the reserve team, including Defederico.

=== Back to Huracán ===
On 11 July 2012 Defederico decided to terminate his contract with Independiente, and went to recover in the facilities of Huracán. On 26 November 2012 he scored his first goal since his return to Huracan against Crucero del Norte.

He renewed his contract with Hurricane for the 2013/2014 season, and was part of the team that was very close to achieving promotion to the First Division after losing the tiebreaker against Independiente .He played 28 games and scored 4 goals to regain continuity after his injury.

Since 2012, in Hurricane, Defederico scored 7 goals in 42 games but then decided to emigrate because of the economic proposals that emerged.

=== Al-Dhafra ===
In August 2014 he went to Al-Dhafra of Dubai for £9,000,000. He failed to adapt in football or socially as Eastern culture is totally different from the western, and the forward and his family were never able to acclimatize. He and his girlfriend suffered different problematic episodes for being not married in a country where it is frowned upon to have children without being married. In November the same year he rescinded his contract with the club.

=== Nueva Chicago ===
In early 2015, after terminating the contract with the club in Dubai, he signed for Club Atlético Nueva Chicago of the First Division of Argentina to strengthen the team for 2015 Argentine Primera División. He had the chance of returning to play in the top flight of Argentine football since playing for Independiente in 2012 .He debuted on February 16 in a 3–1 defeat against Belgrano de Cordoba.

=== Eskişehirspor ===
After rescinding the contract with Nueva Chicago he signed for Eskişehirspor Süper Lig of Turkey. After not getting many opportunities in the starting 11 he terminated the contract midseason with the team in the relegation zone.

=== San Marcos de Arica ===
On 21 January 2016 he signed a contract with Campeonato Nacional (Chile) side San Marcos de Arica.

=== Mumbai City FC ===
On 15 June 2016 it was announced that Defederico has signed for Mumbai City FC in the Indian Super League. On his signing Alexandre Guimaraes, head coach of Mumbai City FC, said, "Defederico possesses immense skill and talent, and has played at some of the most challenging leagues in the world. He brings a lot to the team, and we are confident that he will be a huge asset for Mumbai City FC in the upcoming season. he scored the winning Goal in his debut for MCFC against their state Rivals FC Pune City in MAHA DERBY. his pace & skills quickly made him up Fan favorite in Mumbai. after his heroics in Group Stages of ISL, Mumbai first time qualified for the Play-offs in Three Seasons. "

== International ==
Defederico was part of a national team formed by Diego Maradona on the basis of local players based in the Primera División Argentina. He made his international debut on 20 May 2009 against Panama. He scored the opening goal and assisted in the second goal in a 3–1 win for the Argentina team.

On 3 February 2011 Sergio Batista summoned him for a friendly match in March of that year. Argentina won 4–1 against Venezuela in the match at the Estadio San Juan del Bicentenario .

=== International goals ===
No.	Date	Venue	Opponent	Score	Result	Competition	Ref.
1	May 20, 2009	Estadio Brigadier General Estanislao López, Santa Fe, Argentina	Panama	1 – 0	3 – 1	Friendly	

== Personal life ==
Matias Defederico was also known by the tabloids for his relationship with model and actress Cinthia Fernandez. They were married and have three daughters together, called Charis, Bella and Francesca.
