= Marco Pérez (Colombian footballer) =

Colombian footballer (born 1990)

Personal information
- Full name: Marco Jhonnier Pérez Murillo
- Date of birth: September 18, 1990 (age 36)
- Place of birth: Quibdó, Colombia
- Height: 1.82 m (6 ft 0 in)
- Position: Striker

Team information
- Current team: Deportivo Pereira
- Number: 18

Youth career
- Bocayá Chicó

Senior career*
Years	Team	Apps	(Gls)
2006–2012	Boyacá Chicó	41	(11)
2009–2010	→ Gimnasia (loan)	25	(9)
2010–2011	→ Zaragoza (loan)	16	(1)
2011	→ Independiente (loan)	12	(2)
2012	→ Belgrano (loan)	16	(0)
2012	→ O'Higgins (loan)	13	(2)
2013–2014	Independiente Medellín	35	(6)
2014–2019	Deportes Tolima	168	(56)
2019–2020	Al-Raed	27	(4)
2020–2021	Deportivo Cali	18	(4)
2021	Once Caldas	7	(0)
2022–2023	Águilas Doradas	58	(27)
2024–2025	Junior	34	(3)
2025–	Deportivo Pereira	12	(1)

International career
2006–2009	Colombia U20	14	(4)
- * Club domestic league appearances and goals as of 12 December 2025

Marco Jhonnier Pérez Murillo (born September 18, 1990) is a Colombian footballer who plays as a striker for Categoría Primera A club Deportivo Pereira.

== Career ==
Pérez debuted for Boyacá Chicó in 2006 at the age of 17 and became a starter ahead of more experienced strikers. He played the 2009–10 Argentine Primera División season on loan with Gimnasia y Esgrima La Plata, and helped the team avoid relegation from the first division. On 14 July 2010, Pérez signed a two-year loan deal with La Liga club Real Zaragoza. However, in July 2011 the Colombian forward left Zaragoza after poor performances, and returned to Argentina, joining Independiente.

In January 2012, he joined Belgrano, but had a very poor spell, making 18 appearances without scoring a single goal. In July 2012, he joined Chilean club O'Higgins. In January 2013, he joined Independiente Medellín, leaving after the 2014 Apertura. He joined Deportes Tolima for the 2014 Finalizacion, and was part of the squad that won the 2018 Apertura title against Atlético Nacional. In 2020, he joined Deportivo Cali on a one-year contract, and left when it expired in 2021.

Perez has been capped internationally with Colombia at the u-20 level, playing from 2006 to 2009.

== Career statistics ==
As of match played 28 March 2019

Club statistics
Club	Season	League			Cup		Continental		Total	
Club	Season	Division	Apps	Goals	Apps	Goals	Apps	Goals	Apps	Goals
Boyacá Chicó	2009	Categoría Primera A	16	3	0	0	5	1	21	4
Gimnasia y Esgrima (LP) (loan)	2009–10	Argentine Primera División	25	9	0	0	—		25	9
Real Zaragoza (loan)	2010–11	La Liga	16	1	2	0	—		18	1
Independiente (loan)	2011–12	Argentine Primera División	12	2	0	0	4	1	16	3
Belgrano (loan)	2011–12	Argentine Primera División	16	0	2	0	—		18	0
O'Higgins (loan)	2012	Primera División of Chile	13	2	7	3	2	0	22	5
Independiente Medellín	2013	Categoría Primera A	25	6	5	1	—		30	7
Independiente Medellín	2014	Categoría Primera A	10	0	0	0	—		10	0
Independiente Medellín	Total		35	6	5	1	0	0	40	7
Deportes Tolima	2014	Categoría Primera A	17	3	6	2	—		23	5
Deportes Tolima	2015	Categoría Primera A	41	13	6	1	5	0	52	14
Deportes Tolima	2016	Categoría Primera A	20	4	4	0	—		24	4
Deportes Tolima	2017	Categoría Primera A	41	13	5	4	2	1	48	18
Deportes Tolima	2018	Categoría Primera A	39	19	0	0	—		39	19
Deportes Tolima	2019	Categoría Primera A	9	4	2	2	2	0	13	6
Deportes Tolima	Total		168	56	23	9	9	1	200	66
Career totals			300	79	39	13	20	3	359	95

== International career ==
After a great first season with his club, Pérez won a place in the Colombia national under-20 football team that played the 2009 South American Youth Championship. After helping Boyacá Chicó F.C. lift the Copa Mustang, he received a call up to the full Colombia national football team.

== Honours ==
Club

Boyacá Chicó

- Categoría Primera A (1): 2008-I

Deportes Tolima

- Categoría Primera A (1): 2018-I
- Copa Colombia (1): 2014

Individual

- All-time top scorer in Deportes Tolima (77 goals).
- 2023 Categoría Primera A Apertura top scorer (13 goals) .
