= Adrián Argachá =

Uruguayan footballer (born 1986)

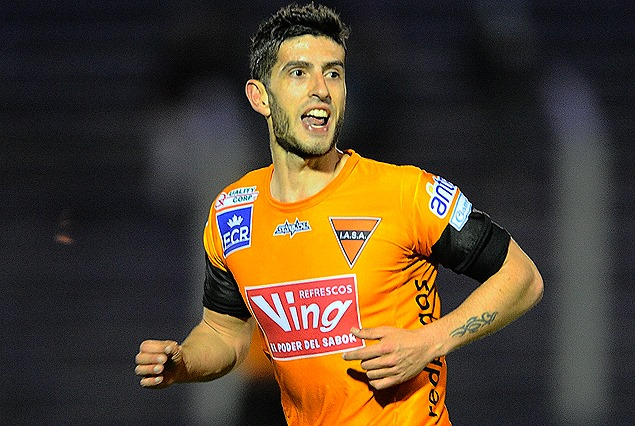

Personal information
- Full name: Adrián Argachá González
- Date of birth: 21 December 1986 (age 39)
- Place of birth: Sarandí del Yí, Uruguay
- Height: 1.78 m (5 ft 10 in)
- Position: Left midfielder

Team information
- Current team: Fénix
- Number: 23

Senior career*
| Years | Team | Apps | (Gls) |
| 2007–2008 | Tacuarembó | 12 | (1) |
| 2008–2010 | Montevideo Wanderers | 13 | (2) |
| 2010–2011 | Defensor Sporting | 12 | (1) |
| 2011–2012 | Independiente | 12 | (0) |
| 2012–2013 | Racing Montevideo | 10 | (0) |
| 2013 | River Plate Montevideo | 0 | (0) |
| 2013–2016 | Sud América | 64 | (7) |
| 2016 | Belgrano | 4 | (0) |
| 2016–2017 | Central Córdoba | 29 | (0) |
| 2017–2019 | Lorca Deportiva | 61 | (4) |
| 2019– | Fénix | 14 | (0) |
- * Club domestic league appearances and goals as of 21:19, 1 May 2020 (UTC)

Adrián Argachá González (born 21 December 1986) is an Uruguayan footballer who plays for Spanish club Centro Atlético Fénix as a left midfielder.
