= Maximiliano Velázquez =

Argentine footballer (born 1980)

Personal information
- Full name: Maximiliano Nicolás Velázquez
- Date of birth: September 12, 1980 (age 46)
- Place of birth: Concepción del Uruguay, Argentina
- Height: 1.76 m (5 ft 9 in)
- Position: Left-back

Youth career
- Ferro Carril Oeste

Senior career*
Years	Team	Apps	(Gls)
1998–2003	Ferro Carril Oeste	79	(12)
2003–2004	Talleres	37	(2)
2004–2010	Lanús	184	(10)
2010–2012	Independiente	40	(2)
2012–2018	Lanús	150	(6)
2018	Aldosivi	13	(1)
2018	Ferro Carril Oeste	11	(0)
Total		514	(33)

Managerial career
- 2022: Elche (assistant)
- 2023: Boca Juniors (assistant)
- 2024–2025: Colo-Colo (assistant)
- 2025–2026: UANL (assistant)
- * Club domestic league appearances and goals

Maximiliano Nicolás Velázquez (born 12 September 1980 in Concepción del Uruguay, Entre Ríos) is a former Argentine football left-back. He is a current assistant coach of Jorge Almirón in Chilean club Colo-Colo.

== Playing career ==
Velázquez started his professional career in 1998 with Ferro Carril Oeste in the Argentine Primera División. Although the club were relegated at the end of the 1999–2000 season, Velázquez opted to stay with them. In 2002 the club suffered a further relegation into the Regionalised 3rd division. Velázquez again opted to stay with the club and helped them to secure promotion back to the 2nd level by winning the 2002-03 Primera B Metropolitana championship.

In 2003 Velázquez returned to the Argentine primera after his transfer to Talleres de Córdoba, but despite finishing 3rd in the Clausura 2004 the club were relegated due to their poor points average and a playoff defeat to Argentinos Juniors.

Velázquez then joined Lanús, where he has established himself as an important member of the first team squad. In 2007, he was part of the squad that won the Apertura 2007 tournament, Lanús' first ever top flight league title.

In 2010, Velázquez joined Independiente.

In February 2012, Velázquez cancelled his contract on Independiente and rejoined Lanús.

He retired after playing for Aldosivi and Ferro Carril Oeste in 2018.

== Coaching career ==
In October 2022, Velázquez joined the technical staff of Jorge Almirón in Spanish club Elche as an assistant coach. He continued alongside him in Boca Juniors and the Chilean club Colo-Colo.

== Honours ==
Lanús

- Primera División: 2007 Apertura, 2016
- Copa del Bicentenario: 2016
- Supercopa Argentina: 2016
- Copa Sudamericana: 2013

Independiente

- Copa Sudamericana: 2010

Aldosivi

- Primera B Nacional: 2017–18
