= Hernán Fredes =

Argentine footballer

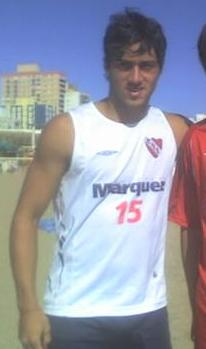

Personal information
- Full name: Hernán Daniel Fredes
- Date of birth: 27 March 1987 (age 39)
- Place of birth: Avellaneda, Argentina
- Height: 1.72 m (5 ft 8 in)
- Position: Midfielder

Youth career
- Independiente

Senior career*
Years	Team	Apps	(Gls)
2006–2014	Independiente	184	(5)
2009–2010	→ Metalist Kharkiv (loan)	4	(0)
2014–2016	Arsenal de Sarandi	35	(0)
2016–2017	Defensa y Justicia	33	(1)
2018	3 de Febrero	39	(5)
2019	Sol de América	25	(2)
2020–2021	Unión San Felipe	14	(1)
2022	Chacarita Juniors	21	(0)
2023	Juventud Unida Universitario	20	(1)
Total		375	(15)
- * Club domestic league appearances and goals

Hernán Fredes (born 27 March 1987) is an Argentine former professional footballer who played as a midfielder.

== Career ==
Fredes made his professional debut in February 2006 and quickly established himself as an important member of the first team squad, playing in various positions including central and left midfielder and second striker.

On 7 July 2009, Fredes signed for Ukrainian side Metalist Kharkiv on loan from Independiente. He returned to Independiente in January 2010.

From the 2010–11 season onwards, he became a determined player on the Independiente squad, winning the Copa Nissan Sudamericana 2010 for first time in club history. On 9 April 2011, he made a goal against Godoy Cruz at Independiente's stadium.

In June 2013, Fredes injured his knee. He was considered out of action for at least six months.

In 2014, he signed with Arsenal de Sarandí.

== Honours ==
Independiente

- Copa Sudamericana: 2010
