= Eduardo Tuzzio =

Argentine footballer (born 1974)

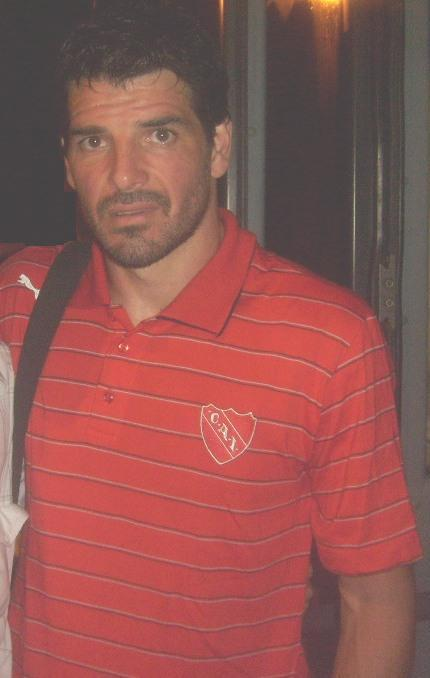

Personal information
- Full name: Eduardo Nicolás Tuzzio
- Date of birth: July 31, 1974 (age 52)
- Place of birth: Buenos Aires, Argentina
- Height: 1.83 m (6 ft 0 in)
- Position: Centre back

Senior career*
Years	Team	Apps	(Gls)
1993–2001	San Lorenzo	174	(6)
1995–1996	→ Quilmes (loan)	40	(1)
2001–2003	Olympique de Marseille	22	(0)
2003–2008	River Plate	119	(6)
2005–2006	→ RCD Mallorca (loan)	10	(0)
2009–2013	Independiente	105	(4)
2013–2014	Ferro Carril Oeste	49	(5)

International career
2005–2007	Argentina	2	(0)
- * Club domestic league appearances and goals

Eduardo Nicolás Tuzzio (born 31 July 1974) is an Argentinian former footballer.

== Career ==
Tuzzio began his professional career in 1993 with San Lorenzo de Almagro. In 1995, he was loaned to Quilmes, staying there just one season before returning to San Lorenzo. In 2001, he was transferred to Olympique Marseille in France's Ligue 1, where he played for two seasons. He returned to Argentina joining River Plate in 2003. He played one season on loan for RCD Mallorca in Spain's La Liga, before returning to River in 2006.

Tuzzio transferred to Independiente following the 2008 Apertura.

== Honours ==
San Lorenzo

- Argentine Primera División (1): 2001 Clausura

River Plate

- Argentine Primera División (3): 2003 Clausura, 2004 Clausura, 2008 Clausura

Independiente

- Copa Sudamericana (1): 2010

== Personal life ==
Tuzzio holds both Argentine and Italian nationality.

== International career ==
Tuzzio was called up to training with the Argentina national football team in preparation for the 2007 Copa América. However, he was not part of the final squad. He earned his second cap against Chile on 18 April 2007.
