= Hilario Navarro =

Argentine footballer (born 1980)

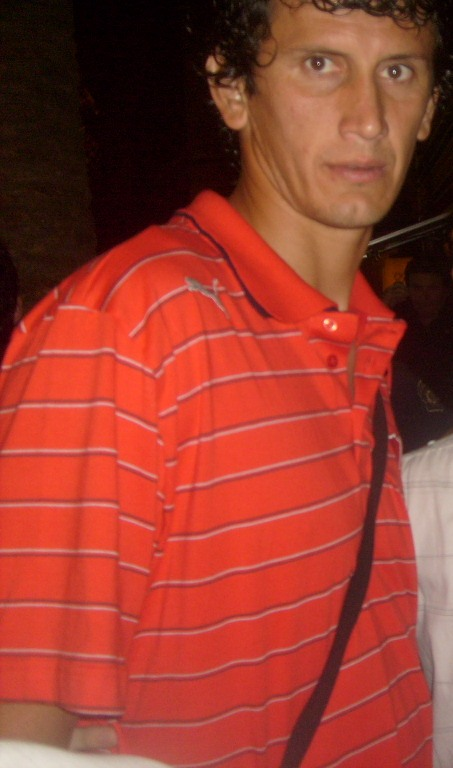

Personal information
- Full name: Hilario Bernardo Navarro Ruiz
- Date of birth: 14 November 1980 (age 45)
- Place of birth: Corrientes, Argentina
- Height: 1.92 m (6 ft 4 in)
- Position: Goalkeeper

Team information
- Current team: Resistencia

Youth career
- Huracán

Senior career*
| Years | Team | Apps | (Gls) |
| 2001–2005 | Guaraní | 111 | (0) |
| 2006–2007 | Cerro Porteño | 21 | (0) |
| 2007–2008 | Racing Club | 28 | (0) |
| 2008–2014 | Independiente | 26 | (0) |
| 2009 | → San Lorenzo (loan) | 14 | (0) |
| 2014–2016 | Estudiantes | 34 | (0) |
| 2016–2017 | Banfield | 44 | (0) |
| 2017–2018 | Boca Unidos | 20 | (0) |
| 2019– | Resistencia | | |
- * Club domestic league appearances and goals as of 02:31, 2 November 2019 (UTC)

Hilario Bernardo Navarro Ruiz (born 14 November 1980) is an Argentine professional footballer who plays as a goalkeeper for Resistencia in Paraguay.

== Career ==
Navarro started in the youth divisions of Huracán Corrientes. In 2001, he was signed by Paraguayan side Club Guaraní, staying at the team until 2005. Subsequently, in 2006, Navarro joined Cerro Porteño, also of Paraguay. One year later, he returned to Argentina to join Racing Club, in the first division. He established himself as the club's first choice goalkeeper after Gustavo Campagnuolo suffered a one-game suspension and a subsequent injury.

On August 7, 2008, Navarro signed with Independiente, Racing's biggest rivals. On March 11, 2009, San Lorenzo negotiated a loan agreement with Independiente for 4 months of Navarro's services as their primary goalkeeper, to stand in for the injured Agustín Orión.

In March 2019, Navarro joined Resistencia in Paraguay.

== Honours ==
Independiente

- Copa Sudamericana (1): 2010
