= Carlos Matheu =

Argentine footballer

Personal information
- Full name: Carlos Javier Matheu
- Date of birth: 13 May 1985 (age 41)
- Place of birth: Quilmes, Argentina
- Height: 1.83 m (6 ft 0 in)
- Position: Centre back

Team information
- Current team: Quilmes

Senior career*
Years	Team	Apps	(Gls)
2004–2008	Independiente	58	(5)
2008–2009	Cagliari	15	(0)
2009–2012	Independiente	40	(3)
2012–2013	Atalanta	4	(0)
2013	→ Siena (loan)	0	(0)
2013–2014	Siena	8	(0)
2014–2016	Defensa y Justicia	29	(1)
2016–2017	Banfield	41	(1)
2017–2018	Huracán	6	(0)
2018	Peñarol	4	(0)
2019	Unión Española	5	(0)
2019–	Quilmes	0	(0)

International career
2010	Argentina	1	(0)
- * Club domestic league appearances and goals as of 15:31, 14 October 2019 (UTC)

Carlos Javier Matheu (born 13 May 1985) is an Argentine former professional footballer who played as a centre back for Quilmes Atlético Club.

== Career ==
=== Club career ===
Matheu made his professional debut in 2004 in Club Atletico Independiente, and soon established himself as a member of the first team squad. In the Apertura 2007 he chipped in with 4 goals in 15 games, a useful return for a defender.

He nearly moved to Lokomotiv Moscow for $3.3million (£1.6million) in July 2008 but chose to play for Cagliari instead. He was now repurchased by Independiente for 1.5 million dollars for the 50% of his rights (Independiente already owned 50%). After one season in Italy, he returned to Independiente.

At the end of the 2011–12 season, Matheu's contract expired and he returned to Italy, signing a contract with Atalanta.

On 30 August 2013, the Siena board announced the loan signing of Matheu until the end of the season.

On 1 January 2016, Matheu signed for Argentine club CA Banfield.

=== International career ===
Matheu received his first call-up to the Argentina squad for the friendly against Costa Rica on 26 January 2010.

== Honours ==
Independiente

- Copa Sudamericana (1): 2010

Peñarol

- Uruguayan Primera División: 2018
