= Julián Velázquez =

Argentine footballer

Personal information
- Full name: Julián Alberto Velázquez
- Date of birth: 23 October 1990 (age 36)
- Place of birth: Corrientes, Argentina
- Height: 1.84 m (6 ft 0 in)
- Position: Centre-back

Team information
- Current team: Chacarita Juniors

Youth career
- 2004–2005: Boca Unidos
- 2005–2009: Independiente

Senior career*
Years	Team	Apps	(Gls)
2009–2014	Independiente	106	(1)
2015–2016	Palermo	0	(0)
2015	→ Gaz Metan Mediaș (loan)	14	(0)
2015–2016	→ Hajduk Split (loan)	17	(0)
2016–2018	Cruz Azul	49	(1)
2018–2022	Tijuana	52	(1)
2020	→ Querétaro (loan)	21	(1)
2021	→ Talleres (loan)	1	(0)
2022	→ Rosario Central (loan)	2	(1)
2023–2024	Wilstermann	29	(3)
2024–2025	PSBS Biak	28	(3)
2026–	Chacarita Juniors	6	(0)

International career
2011	Argentina	1	(0)
- * Club domestic league appearances and goals as of 17:45, 1 April 2026 (UTC)

Julián Alberto Velázquez (born 23 October 1990) is an Argentine professional footballer who plays as a centre-back for Chacarita Juniors.

== Career ==
Velázquez debuted with Independiente aged 19 in a 1–0 home win over Gimnasia y Esgrima La Plata, for the 13th fixture of the 2009 Apertura. Under Américo Gallego's coaching, he started the game as a left back replacing Lucas Mareque (who was suspended).

In 2010, he was a regular for Independiente in their Copa Sudamericana winning campaign, scoring two goals in the competition (one in the final against Goiás).

In July 2012 he was about to join Italian club Genoa. However, as the club had spent a non-EU signing quota from abroad on Anselmo de Moraes, the deal collapsed.

In January 2015, Velázquez signed with Italian Serie A club Palermo. He immediately went out on loan to Romanian club Gaz Metan Mediaș.

On the 12th of August 2015, Julian Velazquez was confirmed to be the newest signing of 1. HNL giants HNK Hajduk Split, signing a one-year deal. He was the first Argentinian to play for the Croatian club. He proved to be a great player for Hajduk and became instantly a first team regular but injuries prevented him from playing even more. On 7 June 2016, his loan at Hajduk Split ended.

On 21 May 2024, PSBS Biak has officially reached an agreement with Julián Velázquez to join the team for the next 2 seasons.

== International career ==
He made his debut with the national team on April 20, 2011, on the occasion of the friendly match against Ecuador equalized 2-2.

== Honours ==
=== Club ===
Independiente

- Copa Sudamericana (1): 2010
