= Nicolás Cabrera (footballer) =

Argentine footballer (born 1984)

Personal information
- Full name: Nicolás Alejandro Cabrera
- Date of birth: June 15, 1984 (age 42)
- Place of birth: La Plata, Argentina
- Height: 1.74 m (5 ft 9 in)
- Position: Right winger

Youth career
- Gimnasia

Senior career*
Years	Team	Apps	(Gls)
2003–2006	Gimnasia	71	(2)
2007	Racing Club	24	(1)
2008	Newell's Old Boys	15	(0)
2008–2010	Vélez Sársfield	45	(3)
2010–2012	Independiente	41	(3)
2012	→ Gimnasia (loan)	19	(6)
2013	Gimnasia	16	(0)
2013–2014	All Boys	29	(1)
2014–2016	Quilmes	13	(0)
2017	San Carlos		
2017	Kuala Lumpur FA		
- * Club domestic league appearances and goals as of 26 March 2015

Nicolás Alejandro Cabrera (born 5 June 1984) is an Argentine former football right winger who last played for Quilmes.

== Club career ==
Cabrera made his professional debut in 2003 for Gimnasia y Esgrima La Plata, while coached by Mario Gómez. He played for the club until 2006, making 71 appearances and scoring 3 goals and playing both Copa Libertadores and Copa Sudamericana. His best season with Gimnasia was the second place obtained in the 2005 Apertura, coached by Pedro Troglio.

In 2007, he was transferred to Racing where he could not establish himself as a regular first team player. For the 2008 Clausura he went to play for Newell's Old Boys and had mostly good performances. However, due to personal problems with Newell's manager, Ricardo Caruso Lombardi, he was left out of the squad.

For the 2008-09 season he was bought by Vélez Sársfield. He played mostly as a starter in the right wing during Hugo Tocalli and Ricardo Gareca's coaching eras, until he suffered a knee injury in the fifth game of the 2009 Clausura (1–0 away victory over Estudiantes de La Plata). Vélez won the tournament, but Cabrera's participation was limited to the first 5 games. He returned the following season, and scored his first post-injury goal in the 4–2 home victory over Racing.

== Honours ==
Vélez Sársfield

- Argentine Primera División (1): 2009 Clausura

Independiente

- Copa Sudamericana (1): 2010
