= 2011 Argentine Primera División relegation playoffs =

2011 River Plate v Belgrano promotion and relegation playoffs
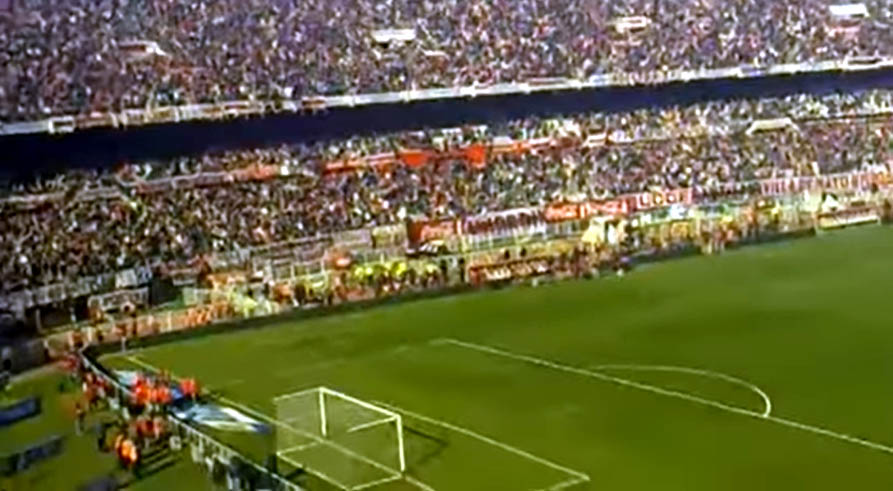
- River Plate supporters at Estadio Monumental prior to the 2nd match
- Event: 2010–11 Primera División
Belgrano (C)	River Plate
3	1
- on aggregate

First leg
Belgrano (C)	River Plate
2	0
- Date: 22 June 2011
- Venue: El Gigante de Alberdi, Córdoba
- Referee: Néstor Pitana

Second leg
River Plate	Belgrano (C)
1	1
- Date: 26 June 2011
- Venue: Estadio Monumental, Buenos Aires
- Referee: Sergio Pezzotta

The 2011 River Plate relegation was a promotion playoff series contested by River Plate and Belgrano (Córdoba) to determine which team would be promoted to the Primera División or relegated to the Primera B Nacional, according to the promotion and relegation system in force at the time.

It was the first promotion and relegation series contested by River Plate, and the fourth by Belgrano (with previous appearances in 2006 (won to Olimpo), 2008, and 2009, all of them while playing in Primera B Nacional).

Belgrano won the series 3–1 on aggregate promoting to Primera División, while River Plate was relegated for the first time in their history to the second division of Argentina. During the second leg match, River Plate supporters reacted violently, vandalising the club facilities and facing the police in confrontation. The riot left 68 people injured, and 50 supporters detained.

River Plate's relegation generated an unprecedented impact in the country's sports and social spheres, being named "the saddest day in the history of the club".

== Participant teams ==
Team	Position in championship	Previous app.
River Plate	17th. of 2010–11 Primera División	(none)
Belgrano (C)	4th. of 2010–11 Primera B Nacional	**2006**, 2008, 2009

Bold indicates winners.

== Format ==
The playoffs were part of the 2010–11 Primera División and the 2010–11 Primera B Nacional seasons, where the 17th and 18th placed teams in the Primera División relegation table (River Plate and Gimnasia y Esgrima (LP), respectively) played the 3rd and 4th-place finishers of the Primera B Nacional (San Martín (SJ) and Belgrano (C), respectively) in a two-legged tie series.

The winner of each would claim a spot in the following Primera División season. The Primera División team (Team 1) played the second leg at home due to being the team in the upper division. In case of the series finished tied on goal difference, River Plate would remain in Primera also for being the team from the upper division.

== Background ==
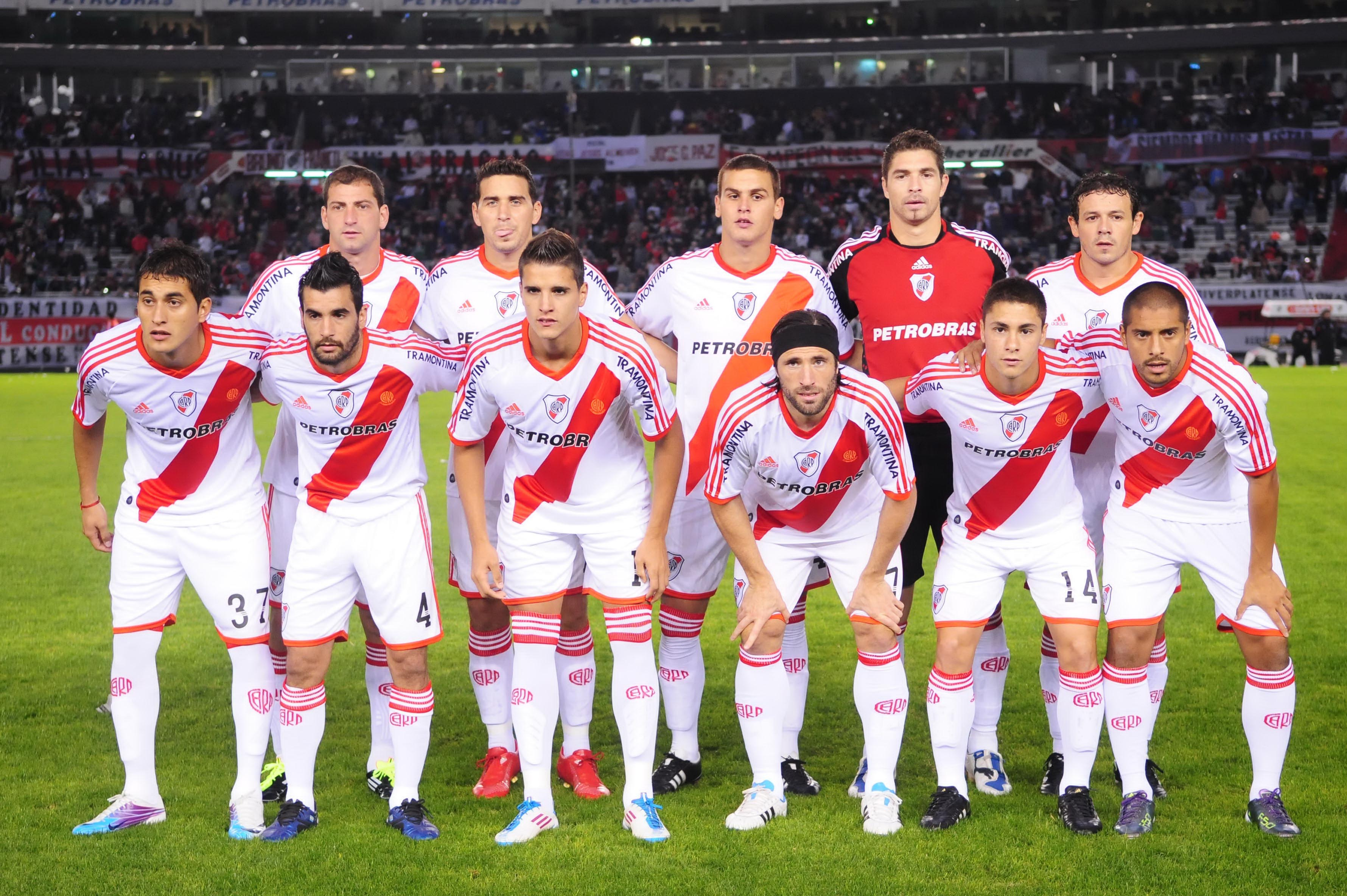
A team of River Plate in 2011 Clausura

River Plate had won the 2008 Clausura managed by Diego Simeone (after his successful run on Estudiantes de La Plata), in the following season the team finished in the last position. (which did not happen since 1912) That disastrous campaign was highlighted as a first step to the team's relegation three years later.

Due to the poor campaigns made in the aforementioned seasons that put the team in the relegation zone, River Plate executives decided to hire some players in order to earn points during the 2010–11 season. Some of the footballers that came to the club included Juan Pablo Carrizo (returned to the club), Mariano Pavone, Leandro Caruso, Jonatan Maidana, and Paraguayan Adalberto Román. In the 2010 Apertura and after some bad results, manager Angel Cappa was dismissed, being replaced by Juan José López as interim manager. Under his coaching, River Plate finished 4th.

For the 2011 Clausura, president of the club Daniel Passarella (elected in December 2009) officialised López as manager after the good performance in the previous season. Due to the poor economic situation of the club, River Plate gave Ariel Ortega (who had a personal conflict with Passarella since 2007, when Passarella was manager of the team) on loan to All Boys, which had recently promoted to Primera División.

Despite a good beginning in the Clausura, River Plate only could earn 4 points out of 21, finishing 17th. (out of 20) in the relegation table so the team had to play a series to avoid being relegated to the second division.

== Venues ==
Córdoba	Buenos Aires
El Gigante de Alberdi	Estadio Monumental
Capacity: **38,000**	Capacity: **59,109**

== Matches ==
=== First leg ===
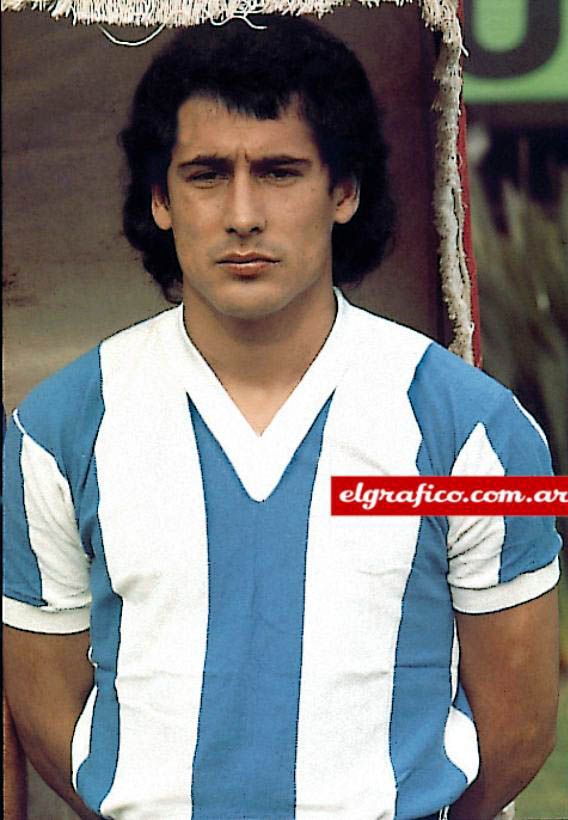
Juan José López was the River Plate manager

The first leg was held in El Gigante de Alberdi, home venue of Belgrano. River Plate's manager surprised everyone by fielding a team made up of many young players, leaving experienced players such as Mariano Pavone, Leandro Caruso and Jonatan Maidana on the bench. The match ended with a score of 2–0 in favor of the home team. The first goal was scored by midfielder César Mansanelli in the 25th minute; it came from a penalty awarded by referee Néstor Pitana after Paraguayan defender Adalberto Román touched the ball with his hand. The foul was judged as intentional by linesman Yamil Bonfá, as Pitana had initially ignored it.

The second goal came in the 4th minute of the second half. Mansanelli crossed from the right, Luciano Lollo headed it in and César Pereyra sent the ball to the goal to increase the score to 2–0 for the Cordobese team.

The violence came when more than ten River Plate fans, some of them hooded, invaded the pitch to heckle and attack their players (one heckled and pushed Román and another kicked Arano in the boot), causing the match to be stopped for 20 minutes. Adding to River's already complicated situation was the fact that three of the team's undisputed starters received their fifth yellow card of the tournament and were unable to play in the second leg: Almeyda, Román, and Ferrari.

=== Second leg ===
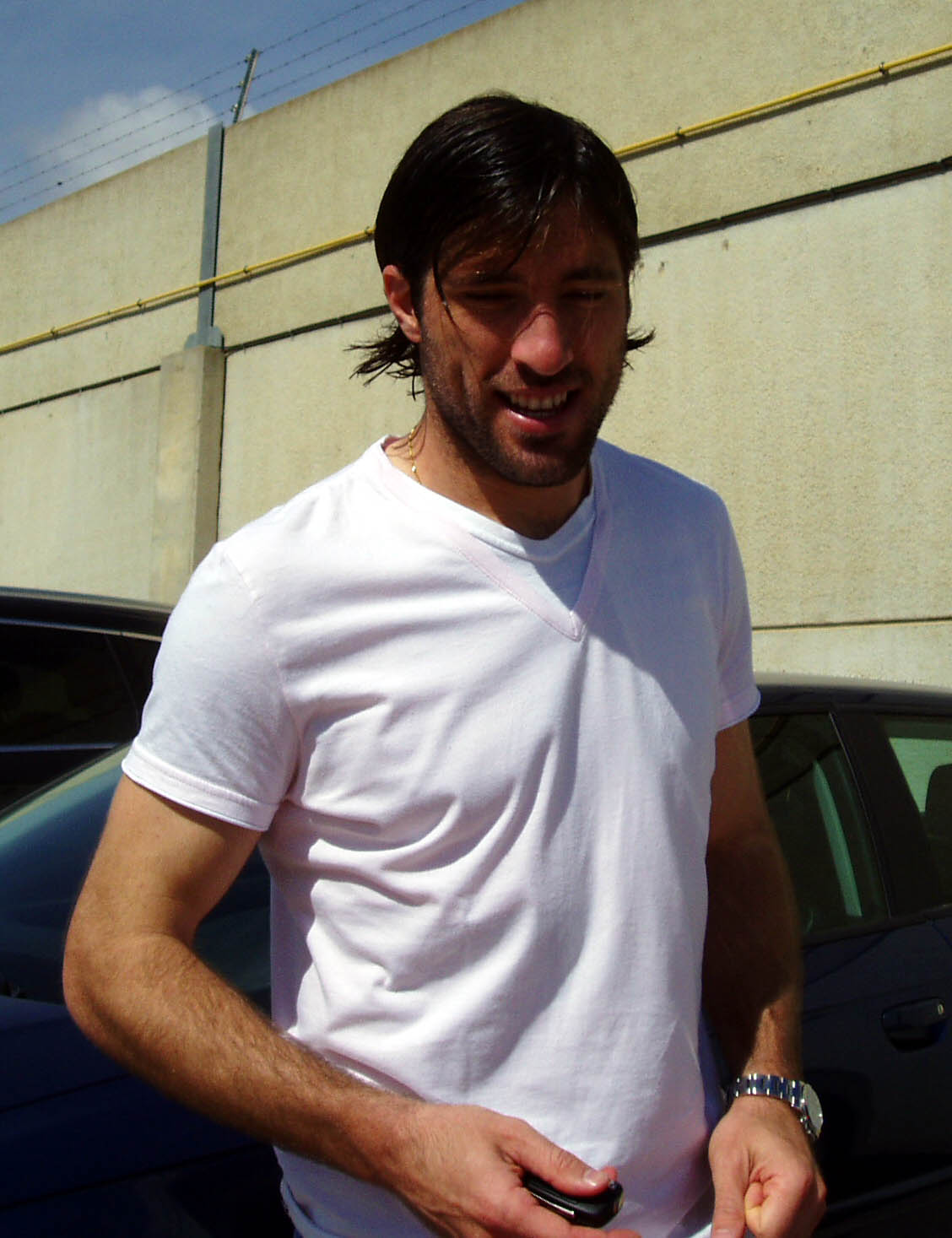
Forward Mariano Pavone missed a penalty shot that could have tied the series

The second leg kicked off at River Plate's Estadio Monumental. Just three minutes into the match, Belgrano's César Mansanelli temporarily gave his team the lead; however, Pezzotta ruled out the goal, citing offside. Mariano Pavone, who scored River Plate's only goal in the second leg of the qualifying round, also missed a penalty in that same match. Two minutes later, River Plate's forward Mariano Pavone gave his team the lead, putting them on the verge of a draw and safety. Because River Plate was the team defending its First Division spot, it had a sporting advantage that would allow it to remain in the First Division in the event of a tie.

In the second half, the game was far from over, until the 16th minute when Belgrano midfielder Guillermo Farré took advantage of a defensive error from River; after a running finish, he scored a goal to tie the game, which eventually became the final score. Despite this, the excitement continued when, 24 minutes into the second half, Leandro Caruso was fouled by Cristian Tavio and referee Pezzotta awarded a penalty kick to River Plate. Nevertheless, Mariano Pavone lose the chance when his shot was saved by goalkeeper Juan Carlos Olave.

The final score relegated River Plate to the second division for the first time in their history, ending 102 uninterrupted years in the top division of Argentine football since 1909.

=== Details ===
2010–11 Primera División
Promotion and relegation playoffs
22 June 2011
21:00
First leg

Belgrano (C)	2–0	River Plate
Mansanelli 25' (pen.); Pereyra 49'	Report

El Gigante de Alberdi, Córdoba
Attendance: 20,000
Referee: Néstor Pitana

**Belgrano (C)**
**River Plate**

GK	1	(Argentina) Juan Carlos Olave
DF	2	(Argentina) Gastón Turus (c)
DF	4	(Argentina) Claudio Pérez
DF	6	(Argentina) Luciano Lollo
DF	3	(Argentina) Cristian Tavio
MF	11	(Argentina) César Mansanelli
MF	5	(Argentina) Guillermo Farré	Yellow card
MF	9	(Uruguay) Ribair Rodríguez	Yellow card
MF	8	(Argentina) Juan C. Maldonado	Yellow card	(substituted off) 46'
MF	10	(Argentina) Franco Vázquez		(substituted off) 64'
FW	7	(Argentina) César Pereyra	Yellow card	(substituted off) 58'
Substitutions:
MF	16	(Argentina) Martín Andrizzi		(substituted on) 46'
FW	18	(Argentina) Mariano Campodónico		(substituted on) 58'
MF	15	(Argentina) Lucas Parodi		(substituted on) 64'
Manager:
(Argentina) Ricardo Zielinski

GK	1	(Argentina) Juan Pablo Carrizo
DF	4	(Argentina) Paulo Ferrari	Yellow card
DF	2	(Argentina) Alexis Ferrero
DF	19	(Paraguay) Adalberto Román	Yellow card
DF	3	(Argentina) Carlos Arano
MF	29	(Argentina) Mauro Díaz		(substituted off) 45'
MF	14	(Argentina) Ezequiel Cirigliano
MF	25	(Argentina) Matías Almeyda (c)	Yellow card
MF	10	(Argentina) Erik Lamela	Yellow card
MF	37	(Argentina) Roberto Pereyra		(substituted off) 72'
FW	9	(Argentina) Rogelio Funes Mori		(substituted off) 89'
Substitutions:
FW	11	(Argentina) Leandro Caruso		(substituted on) 45'
DF	6	(Argentina) Jonatan Maidana		(substituted on) 72'
FW	7	(Argentina) Mariano Pavone		(substituted on) 89'	Yellow card
Manager:
(Argentina) Juan José López

26 June 2011
15:00
Second Leg

River Plate	1–1 Suspended on 89'	Belgrano (C)
Pavone 5'	Report	Farré 61'

Estadio Monumental, Buenos Aires
Referee: Sergio Pezzotta

**River Plate**
**Belgrano (C)**

GK	1	(Argentina) Juan Pablo Carrizo (c)
DF	6	(Argentina) Jonatan Maidana	Yellow card
DF	2	(Argentina) Alexis Ferrero
DF	13	(Uruguay) Juan Manuel Díaz
MF	15	(Argentina) Facundo Affranchino		(substituted off) 70'
MF	5	(Argentina) Walter Acevedo		(substituted off) 64'
MF	3	(Argentina) Carlos Arano	Yellow card
MF	37	(Argentina) Roberto Pereyra
MF	10	(Argentina) Erik Lamela	Yellow card
MF	11	(Argentina) Leandro Caruso
FW	7	(Argentina) Mariano Pavone	Yellow card
Substitutions:
FW	34	(Argentina) Daniel Villalva		(substituted on) 64'
MF	8	(Argentina) Fabián Bordagaray		(substituted on) 70'
Manager:
(Argentina) Juan José López

GK	1	(Argentina) Juan Carlos Olave
DF	2	(Argentina) Gastón Turus (c)
DF	4	(Argentina) Claudio Pérez	Yellow card
DF	6	(Argentina) Luciano Lollo	Yellow card
DF	3	(Argentina) Cristian Tavio	Yellow card
MF	11	(Argentina) César Mansanelli		(substituted off) 86'
MF	5	(Argentina) Guillermo Farré	Yellow card
MF	9	(Uruguay) Ribair Rodríguez	Yellow card
MF	8	(Argentina) Juan C. Maldonado		(substituted off) 46'
MF	10	(Argentina) Franco Vázquez		(substituted off) 64'
FW	7	(Argentina) César Pereyra	Yellow card	(substituted off) 58'
Substitutions:
MF	16	(Argentina) Martín Andrizzi		(substituted on) 46'
MF	15	(Argentina) Lucas Parodi		(substituted on) 86'
Manager:
(Argentina) Ricardo Zielinski

Note: Belgrano won 3–1 on aggregate, promoting to Primera División, while River Plate was relegated.

== Aftermath ==
=== Immediate consequences ===
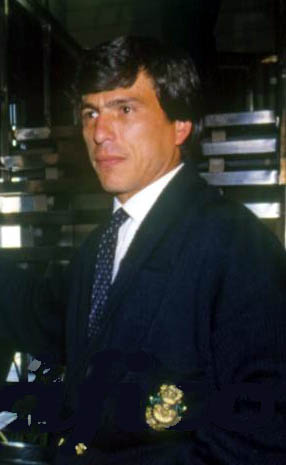
Daniel Passarella was president of the club when the team was relegated. His management was largely criticized, even blaming him for the relegation

The following day, June 27, Juan José López resigned as manager. Matías Almeyda, now a former club player, took over as his successor.

A 23-year-old fan slit his wrists, while another young man of the same age committed suicide by throwing himself onto the Urquiza Line tracks in Tres de Febrero Partido.

Daniel Passarella, the club's president, announced that he would not resign and would remain in office until the end of the season. He also denied having been victim of multiple threats.

In the vicinity of Estadio Monumental, especially along Avenida del Libertador between Montañeses and Monroe streets, 60 businesses were looted and damaged, as well as 150 vehicles and the fronts of dozens of houses and apartment buildings. It was estimated that at least $ 4 million in damages were caused to private individuals. It was also stated that River Plate, the national government, and the city government would be responsible for compensating the victims for such damages.

=== Impact on media ===
Front page of Clarín covering the relegation and the riot after the match

As River Plate was one of the most important football clubs of Argentina, its relegation caused a strong commotion in the sports media, not only in Argentina but worldwide. In Spain, the sports newspaper As headlined: "River Plate consummates its disaster and is relegated"; while the newspaper Marca titled "River Plate goes to hell"

The relegation was also covered by La Gazzetta dello Sport of Italy ("River Plate goes to hell") and Brazilian Lance! ("Tragedy: River Plate is relegated"). Also in Brazil, the newspaper Folha reported that: "River Plate misses a penalty, draws at home and is relegated, in Argentina". In the United Kingdom, The Telegraph chose a more formal tone to describe the situation, only stating "River Plate was relegated for the first time in its history".

=== Repercusion on players ===
Some notable former players of River Plate expressed their sorrow after the relegation, among them were Alfredo Di Stéfano, who stated "it's simply enough to make you cry. I'm so sorry. It hurts all of us who carry this feeling for the glorious River Plate in our hearts. So many doubts were evident, so many changes of direction, a lack of serenity, while Norberto Alonso said: "I haven't realised yet, I haven't had my work cut out for me, even though I was aware of the things that were happening. In fact, I had to go to a clinic to have my blood pressure checked because I was experiencing chest pains. I'm going through a terrible time".

=== Passarella's role ===
Most of River Plate fans blamed president Daniel Passarella for the relegation to the second division, making him responsible for the downfall. Nevertheless, Passarella has always denied such accusations. In 2023, he attended Estadio Monumental for the first time since River Plate was relegated to participate in a celebration to honor players of the club that had won a FIFA World Cup with Argentina.
