= Ubaldo Fillol Award =

Argentine football award

- Country: Argentina
- First award: 2008
- Final award: 2014

Highlights
- Most awards: Marcelo Barovero (4)
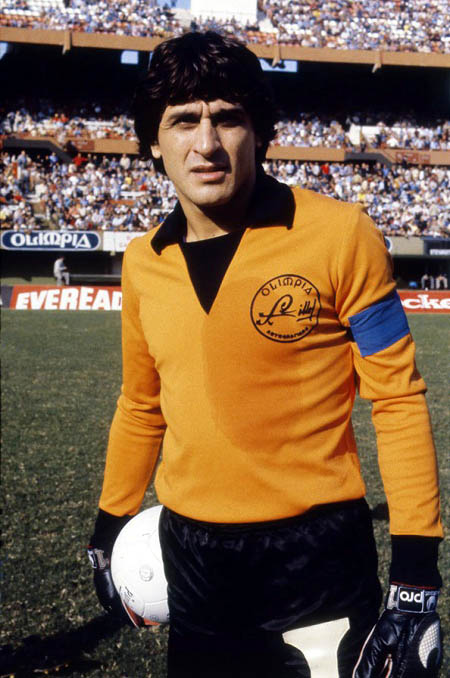
- Goalkeeper Ubaldo Fillol

The Ubaldo Fillol Award (from the Spanish: Premio Ubaldo Fillol), was a football award that went to the goalkeeper with the lowest goals-to-games ratio of each tournament of the Argentine Primera División. The award was created by Argentine World Cup winning goalkeeper Ubaldo Fillol (considered by some journalists as the best Argentine goalkeeper ever) in 2008, and was named after him. Since the 2009 Clausura tournament, the Argentine Football Association recognized the award as official.

== Rules ==
To win the award, a goalkeeper had to play at least 14 games in the tournament (over the 19 possible). Only matches in which the goalkeeper played at least 60 minutes were accounted. The result obtained from dividing the total goals conceded by the total games played by the keeper determined the standings, with the lowest average winning the award. In case more than one goalkeeper shared the lowest average, the winner was the one who had played more games. If that did not break the tie, it would be defined via an online opinion poll in Ubaldo Fillol's official website.

== Winners ==
Keys

- GP: games played
- GC: Goal conceded
- Av: Average

Ed.	Tournament	Player	Nation.	Club	GP	GC	Av.	Ref.
1	2008 Apertura	Gastón Sessa	ARG	Gimnasia y Esgrima LP	17	14	0.82	
2	2009 Clausura	Germán Montoya	ARG	Vélez Sársfield	19	13	0.68	
3	2009 Apertura	Cristian Lucchetti	ARG	Banfield	17	9	0.53	
4	2010 Clausura	Nelson Ibáñez	ARG	Godoy Cruz	19	14	0.74	
5	2010 Apertura	Marcelo Barovero	ARG	Vélez Sársfield	16	6	0.38	
6	2011 Clausura	Marcelo Barovero	ARG	Vélez Sársfield	19	17	0.89	
7	2011 Apertura	Agustín Orión	ARG	Boca Juniors	19	6	0.31	
8	2012 Clausura	Nicolás Cambiasso	ARG	All Boys	18	11	0.61	
9	2012 Inicial	Agustín Marchesín	ARG	Lanús	19	10	0.49	
10	2013 Final	Juan Carlos Olave	ARG	Belgrano (C)	18	13	0.72	
11	2013 Inicial	Marcelo Barovero	ARG	River Plate	17	11	0.65	
12	2014 Final	Gerónimo Rulli	ARG	Estudiantes LP	19	11	0.57	
13	2014	Marcelo Barovero	ARG	River Plate	18	12	0.67	
