= Danon (surname) =

Danon or Danón (Hebrew: דנון) is the surname of the following notable people:

- Abraham Danon (1857–1925), Turkish rabbi, Hebraist, writer, and poet
- Ambra Danon (died 2023), Italian costume designer
- Danny Danon (born 1971), Israeli politician and former diplomat
- David Danon (1921–2015), Israeli physician and scientist
- Éric Danon (born 1957), French diplomat
- Joseph ibn Danon, 17th-century Hebraist and Talmudist
- Laurence Danon (born 1956), French businesswoman
- Meir Benjamin Menahem Danon (1770–1854), rabbinical writer
- Nisan Danon, Israeli football player
- Oskar Danon (1913–2009), Yugoslav composer and conductor
- Pierre Danon (born 1956), French entrepreneur
- Raymond Danon (1930–2018), French film producer
- Vitalis Danon (1897–1969), Jewish-Tunisian writer
- Yaco Danón, Argentine football player
- Yael Danon (born 2006), Israeli-Panamanian singer
- Yehuda Danon (born 1940), Surgeon General of the Israel Defense Forces
- Yom-Tov Danon, Jewish rabbi and author
