= Lucca Sesano =

Argentine professional footballer

Personal information
- Date of birth: 29 September 2002 (age 24)
- Place of birth: Argentina
- Height: 1.82 m (6 ft 0 in)
- Position: Midfielder

Team information
- Current team: All Boys

Youth career
- 2012–2020: All Boys

Senior career*
Years	Team	Apps	(Gls)
2020–	All Boys	6	(0)
- * Club domestic league appearances and goals as of 15:08, 6 June 2022 (UTC)

Lucca Sesano (born 29 September 2002) is an Argentine professional footballer who plays as a central midfielder for All Boys.

== Career ==
Sesano came through the youth ranks at All Boys, having joined in 2012. He was promoted into the first-team squad under manager José Santos Romero in late-2020, with the central midfielder initially featuring in the club's pre-season friendlies ahead of the 2020 Primera B Nacional campaign; notably scoring against Lanús Reserves on 16 October. In the following month, on 28 November, Sesano made his senior debut in a goalless draw away to Brown in Primera B Nacional; appearing for the full duration.

== Career statistics ==
As of 7 January 2021.

Appearances and goals by club, season and competition
Club	Season	League			Cup		League Cup		Continental		Other		Total	
Club	Season	Division	Apps	Goals	Apps	Goals	Apps	Goals	Apps	Goals	Apps	Goals	Apps	Goals
All Boys	2020	Primera B Nacional	1	0	0	0	—		—		0	0	1	0
Career total			1	0	0	0	—		—		0	0	1	0
