= Danon =

Danon may refer to:

== Japanese Thoroughbred racehorses ==
- Danon Fantasy
- Danon Kingly
- Danon Platina
- Danon Premium
- Danon Scorpion
- Danon Smash
- Danon The Kid

== Other uses ==
- Danon (surname)
- Danon disease
