= 2012–13 Argentine Primera División season =

122nd season of top-tier football league in Argentina

Primera División
- Season: 2012–13
- Champions: Torneo Inicial: Vélez Sarsfield (9th title); Torneo Final: Newell's Old Boys (6th title); Super Champions: Vélez Sarsfield (10th title)
- Relegated: San Martín (SJ); Independiente; Unión
- 2013 Copa Libertadores: Vélez Sarsfield; Newell's Old Boys; Boca Juniors; Tigre (via 2012 Copa Sudamericana)
- 2013 Copa Sudamericana: Lanús; River Plate; Racing; Belgrano; San Lorenzo; Vélez Sarsfield
- 2014 Copa Libertadores: Newell's Old Boys; Vélez Sarsfield
- Matches: 381
- Goals: 854 (2.24 per match)
- Top goalscorer: Torneo Inicial: Facundo Ferreyra; Ignacio Scocco (13 goals each); Torneo Final: Emanuel Gigliotti; Ignacio Scocco (11 goals each)
- Biggest home win: San Martín (SJ) 6–1 Boca Juniors (Apr. 13, 2013); River Plate 5–0 Godoy Cruz (Oct. 7, 2012); Newell's Old Boys 5–0 Unión (Jun. 10, 2013)
- Biggest away win: Arsenal 1–5 Vélez Sarsfield (Nov. 3, 2012); Arsenal 0–4 River Plate (Sep. 30, 2012)
- Highest scoring: Atlético de Rafaela 5–3 Argentinos Juniors (Sep. 29, 2012) (8 goals)
- Longest winning run: Lanús -7 matches- (Oct. 5 - Nov. 19, 2012)
- Longest unbeaten run: Newell's Old Boys - 15 matches- (Aug. 4 - Nov. 15, 2012); Lanús -15 matches- (Dec. 8, 2012 - May 20, 2013)
- Longest losing run: Argentinos Juniors -6 matches- (Nov. 24, 2012 - Feb. 22, 2013)

The 2012–13 Primera División season was the 122nd season of top-flight professional football in Argentina. It started on August 3, 2012 and ended on June 29, 2013. Twenty teams competed in the league, eighteen returning from the 2011–12 season and two promoted from the Primera B Nacional Championship (Championship winners River Plate and runners-up Quilmes). The two promoted clubs avoided relegation.

In the first half of the season Vélez Sarsfield became champion of the 2012 Torneo Inicial "Eva Perón", winning the “Evita Capitana” League Cup. In the second one Newell's Old Boys clinched the 2013 Torneo Final "Eva Perón", winning the “Juana Azurduy” League Cup.

In the Superfinal Vélez Sarsfield were crowned Argentina's Super champions after a 1–0 victory over Newell's Old Boys in Mendoza. This was the first overall league championship play-off in Argentina since 1991 when Newell's defeated Boca Juniors on penalties.

Independiente was relegated, for first time, to the Primera B Nacional Championship. The other relegated teams were San Martín (SJ) and Unión.

== Format changes ==
The champion of the Torneo Inicial and Torneo Final met in a season ending championship final to determine the super champion. The format for each tournament remained the same as in previous seasons.

Relegation was also changed for the season. Instead of two teams facing direct relegation to the Primera B Nacional, three teams were directly relegated. The promotion/relegation playoffs were eliminated.

== Teams ==
The teams ending the 2011–12 season in the bottom two places of the relegation table were Banfield and Olimpo. They played in the 2012–13 Primera B Nacional Championship. At the same time the 2011–12 Primera B Nacional Championship winners River Plate and runners-up Quilmes were directly promoted at the end of the season. San Lorenzo and San Martín (SJ) remained in the Primera División winning their Relegation/promotion playoffs to Instituto and Rosario Central.

=== Stadia and locations ===
Locations of the 2012−13 Primera División teams outside Greater Buenos Aires.
Locations of the 2012−13 Primera División teams within Greater Buenos Aires.

Club	City	Stadium	Capacity
All Boys	Buenos Aires	Islas Malvinas	21,000
Argentinos Juniors	Buenos Aires	Diego Armando Maradona	24,800
Arsenal	Sarandí	Julio H. Grondona	16,300
Atlético de Rafaela	Rafaela	Nuevo Monumental	16,000
Belgrano	Córdoba	Mario Alberto Kempes	57,000
Boca Juniors	Buenos Aires	Alberto J. Armando	49,000
Colón	Santa Fe	Brigadier General Estanislao López	32,500
Estudiantes (LP)	La Plata	Estadio Ciudad de La Plata	53,000
Godoy Cruz	Godoy Cruz	Malvinas Argentinas	40,268
Independiente	Avellaneda	Libertadores de América	30,000
Lanús	Lanús	Ciudad de Lanús - Néstor Díaz Pérez	46,619
Newell's Old Boys	Rosario	Marcelo Bielsa	38,095
Quilmes	Quilmes	Centenario	30,200
Racing	Avellaneda	Presidente Juan Domingo Perón	55,389
River Plate	Buenos Aires	Monumental Antonio Vespucio Liberti	64,624
San Lorenzo	Buenos Aires	Pedro Bidegain	39,494
San Martín (SJ)	San Juan	Ingeniero Hilario Sánchez	25,286
Tigre	Victoria	José Dellagiovanna	26,282
Unión	Santa Fe	15 de Abril	22,852
Vélez Sarsfield	Buenos Aires	José Amalfitani	45,540

=== Personnel and kits ===
Club	Manager	Kit manufacturer	Main sponsor
All Boys	(Argentina) José Romero	Balonpie	Lácteos Barraza
Argentinos Juniors	(Argentina) Ricardo Caruso Lombardi	Olympikus	Liderar Seguros
Arsenal	(Argentina) Gustavo Alfaro	Lotto	La Nueva Seguros
Atlético de Rafaela	(Argentina) Jorge Burruchaga	Reusch	SanCor
Belgrano	(Argentina) Ricardo Zielinski	Lotto	Tersuave
Boca Juniors	(Argentina) Carlos Bianchi	Nike	BBVA
Colón	(Argentina) Pablo Morant	Umbro	Flecha Bus
Estudiantes (LP)	(Argentina) Mauricio Pellegrino	Adidas	DirecTV
Godoy Cruz	(Argentina) Martín Palermo	Lotto	Mendoza
Independiente	(Argentina) Miguel Ángel Brindisi	Puma	Motomel
Lanús	(Argentina) Guillermo Barros Schelotto	Olympikus	Herbalife/ESCO
Newell's Old Boys	(Argentina) Gerardo Martino	Topper	Motomel
Quilmes	(Argentina) Omar De Felippe	Lotto	Quilmes
Racing	(Argentina) Luis Zubeldía	Olympikus	Banco Hipotecario
River Plate	(Argentina) Ramón Díaz	Adidas	BBVA
San Lorenzo	(Spain) Juan Antonio Pizzi	Lotto	La Nueva Seguros/Banco Ciudad
San Martín (SJ)	(Argentina) Rubén Forestello	Mitre	San Juan
Tigre	(Argentina) Néstor Gorosito	Kappa	Banco Macro
Unión	(Argentina) Facundo Sava	TBS	Flecha Bus
Vélez Sarsfield	(Argentina) Ricardo Gareca	Topper	Samsung

=== Statistics ===
Club	Most goals scored	Goals	Most minutes played ^{1}	Minutes (Matches)
All Boys	(Argentina) Iván Borghello	9	(Argentina) Nicolás Cambiasso	3420 (38)
Argentinos Juniors	(Ecuador) Juan Luis Anangonó	5	(Argentina) Ariel Garcé	2764 (31)
Arsenal	(Argentina) Darío Benedetto	7	(Argentina) Cristian Campestrini	3330 (37)
Arsenal	(Argentina) Lisandro López	7	(Argentina) Cristian Campestrini	3330 (37)
Atlético de Rafaela	(Argentina) César Carignano	5	(Argentina) Guillermo Sara	3240 (36)
Atlético de Rafaela	(Argentina) Federico González	5	(Argentina) Guillermo Sara	3240 (36)
Atlético de Rafaela	(Argentina) Jonathan López	5	(Argentina) Guillermo Sara	3240 (36)
Belgrano	(Argentina) Lucas Melano	5	(Argentina) Guillermo Farré	3310 (37)
Belgrano	(Argentina) Jorge Velázquez	5	(Argentina) Guillermo Farré	3310 (37)
Boca Juniors	(Uruguay) Santiago Silva	11	(Uruguay) Santiago Silva	2441 (28)
Colón	(Argentina) Emanuel Gigliotti	21	(Argentina) Diego Pozo	3016 (34)
Estudiantes (LP)	(Colombia) Duván Zapata	13	(Argentina) Leandro Desábato	3003 (34)
Godoy Cruz	(Argentina) Mauro Obolo	10	(Argentina) Mauro Obolo	3319 (38)
Independiente	(Argentina) Ernesto Farías	5	(Paraguay) Claudio Morel Rodríguez	2483 (29)
Lanús	(Argentina) Silvio Romero	13	(Argentina) Agustín Marchesín	3330 (37)
Newell's Old Boys	(Argentina) Ignacio Scocco	24	(Argentina) Nahuel Guzmán	2970 (33)
Newell's Old Boys	(Argentina) Ignacio Scocco	24	(Argentina) Santiago Vergini	2970 (33)
Quilmes	(Uruguay) Martín Cauteruccio	14	(Argentina) Emanuel Trípodi	3330 (37)
Racing	(Argentina) Luciano Vietto	13	(Argentina) Matías Cahais	3314 (37)
River Plate	(Argentina) Manuel Lanzini	8	(Argentina) Marcelo Barovero	3033 (34)
San Lorenzo	(Argentina) Denis Stracqualursi	8	(Argentina) Pablo Alvarado	3143 (35)
San Martín (SJ)	(Colombia) Humberto Osorio Botello	11	(Argentina) Emmanuel Más	3330 (37)
Tigre	(Argentina) Rubén Botta	5	(Argentina) Mariano Echeverría	3060 (34)
Tigre	(Argentina) Matías Pérez García	5	(Argentina) Mariano Echeverría	3060 (34)
Unión	(Argentina) Andrés Franzoia	8	(Uruguay) Nicolás Correa	3330 (37)
Vélez Sarsfield	(Argentina) Facundo Ferreyra	16	(Argentina) Sebastián Domínguez	2880 (32)

1. Superfinal is not included

=== Managerial changes ===
Team	Outgoing manager	Manner of departure	Date of vacancy	Replaced by	Date of appointment	Position in table
Pre-season changes
Lanús	(Argentina) Gabriel Schürrer	Sacked	June 18, 2012	(Argentina) Guillermo Barros Schelotto	June 20, 2012	N/A
Estudiantes (LP)	(Argentina) Martín Zuccarelli ^{1}	Replaced	June 24, 2012	(Argentina) Diego Cagna	June 29, 2012	N/A
Torneo Inicial changes
Independiente	(Argentina) Cristian Díaz	Resigned	August 25, 2012	(Argentina) Américo Gallego	August 27, 2012	17th
Unión	(Argentina) Frank Kudelka	Resigned	August 31, 2012	(Argentina) Nery Pumpido	September 4, 2012	19th
San Martín (SJ)	(Argentina) Facundo Sava	Sacked	September 3, 2012	(Argentina) Gabriel Perrone ^{2}	September 7, 2012	20th
San Lorenzo	(Argentina) Ricardo Caruso Lombardi	Mutual agreement	October 9, 2012	(Spain) Juan Antonio Pizzi	October 13, 2012	18th
Tigre	(Argentina) Rodolfo Arruabarrena	Resigned	October 21, 2012	(Argentina) Néstor Gorosito	October 22, 2012	19th
Argentinos Juniors	(Argentina) Leonardo Astrada	Resigned	November 4, 2012	(Argentina) Gabriel Schürrer ^{3}	November 15, 2012	17th
Atlético de Rafaela	(Argentina) Rubén Forestello	Sacked	November 18, 2012	(Argentina) Jorge Burruchaga ^{4}	December 5, 2012	15th
Godoy Cruz	(Argentina) Omar Asad	Resigned	November 19, 2012	(Argentina) Martín Palermo ^{5}	November 26, 2012	14th
River Plate	(Argentina) Matías Almeyda	Sacked	November 27, 2012	(Argentina) Ramón Díaz ^{6}	November 29, 2012	9th
Inter-tournament changes
Unión	(Argentina) Nery Pumpido	Resigned	December 8, 2012	(Argentina) Facundo Sava	December 16, 2012	N/A
Boca Juniors	(Argentina) Julio César Falcioni	End of contract	December 10, 2012	(Argentina) Carlos Bianchi	December 17, 2012	N/A
Torneo Final changes
Argentinos Juniors	(Argentina) Gabriel Schürrer	Resigned	February 22, 2013	(Argentina) Ricardo Caruso Lombardi ^{7}	March 14, 2013	20th
San Martín (SJ)	(Argentina) Gabriel Perrone	Resigned	March 10, 2013	(Argentina) Rubén Forestello ^{8}	March 17, 2013	17th
Colón	(Argentina) Roberto Sensini	Resigned	March 16, 2013	(Argentina) Pablo Morant ^{9}	March 17, 2013	20th
Estudiantes (LP)	(Argentina) Diego Cagna	Resigned	March 30, 2013	(Argentina) Mauricio Pellegrino ^{10}	April 5, 2013	19th
Independiente	(Argentina) Américo Gallego	Mutual agreement	April 14, 2013	(Argentina) Miguel Ángel Brindisi	April 16, 2013	16th

- Pre-season changes

1. Interim manager.

- Torneo Inicial

2. (Argentina) Marcelo Vivas was interim manager in the 6th match.
3. (Argentina) Carlos Mayor was interim manager in the 14th and 15th matches.
4. (Argentina) Víctor Bottaniz was interim manager in the 17th and 18th matches.
5. (Argentina) Daniel Oldrá was interim manager in the 17th match.
6. (Argentina) Gustavo Zapata was interim manager in the 18th match.

- Torneo Final

7. (Argentina) Fabián De Sarasqueta was interim manager in the 4th and 5th matches.
8. (Argentina) Marcelo Vivas was interim manager in the 6th match.
9. Interim manager.
10. (Argentina) Martín Zuccarelli was interim manager in the 8th and 9th matches.

== Torneo Inicial ==
The Torneo Inicial was the first tournament of the season. It began on August 3, 2012 and ended on February 13, 2013.

=== Standings ===
Pos	Team	Pld	W	D	L	GF	GA	GD	Pts	Qualification
1	Vélez Sarsfield (C)	19	13	2	4	31	12	+19	41	2013 Copa Libertadores Second Stage
2	Newell's Old Boys	19	9	9	1	23	11	+12	36	
3	Belgrano	19	10	6	3	22	13	+9	36	
4	Lanús	19	10	4	5	23	10	+13	34	
5	Racing	19	9	6	4	26	12	+14	33	
6	Boca Juniors	19	9	6	4	25	20	+5	33	
7	Arsenal	19	9	4	6	19	22	−3	31	
8	River Plate	19	7	8	4	28	16	+12	29	
9	Estudiantes (LP)	19	8	4	7	19	16	+3	28	
10	Colón	19	6	8	5	26	24	+2	26	
11	San Lorenzo	19	6	8	5	20	20	0	26	
12	All Boys	19	5	6	8	19	27	−8	21	
13	Atlético de Rafaela	19	5	5	9	20	28	−8	20	
14	Godoy Cruz	19	5	5	9	13	24	−11	20	
15	Quilmes	19	3	10	6	16	23	−7	19	
16	Argentinos Juniors	19	4	7	8	19	29	−10	19	
17	San Martín (SJ)	19	4	5	10	21	27	−6	17	
18	Independiente	19	3	8	8	16	24	−8	17	
19	Tigre	19	1	10	8	16	27	−11	13	
20	Unión	19	0	7	12	16	33	−17	7	

(C) Champions

Primera División
2012 Torneo Inicial champion

9th title

=== Results ===
Home \ Away	ALL	ARJ	ARS	ATR	BEL	BOC	COL	EST	GCR	IND	LAN	NOB	QUI	RAC	RIV	SLO	SMJ	TIG	USF	VEL
All Boys		0–1	0–1		1–0		1–1				2–1		1–1		0–0			2–2	3–1	0–2
Argentinos Juniors						1–1		2–1	2–1	0–1		1–3		0–2		1–2	1–1	0–0	3–3	
Arsenal		2–2			0–2	1–0	2–0		3–0		1–0				0–4				1–0	1–5
Atlético de Rafaela	2–1	5–3	0–0		1–3		2–0				1–2		1–1		0–0			3–0		0–3
Belgrano		0–0				3–1		1–0	1–0		0–2	0–0		1–0		0–0		1–0	1–0	
Boca Juniors	3–1			2–1				0–0	2–1	2–1		0–0		3–1		3–1	1–1	2–0		
Colón		3–1			2–2	0–0			1–1		1–0	1–2		0–1	1–1				2–0	
Estudiantes (LP)	0–1		2–1	3–1			1–2			2–0			2–1		0–2		2–0			0–0
Godoy Cruz	1–1			2–0				1–0		2–1		1–1	0–0	0–1		0–0	1–0			
Independiente	1–1		0–2	2–0	1–2		2–2				0–2		1–1		2–2			1–1		0–0
Lanús		1–0				2–0		0–0	2–0			0–1		1–1		0–0	2–1	4–1	2–0	
Newell's Old Boys	1–2		2–1	3–0				1–0		0–0			0–0			1–0	2–0			1–0
Quilmes		0–1	1–2		1–1	3–0	2–2				0–0				1–0			0–0	2–1	0–1
Racing	3–1		0–0	1–1				0–1		2–0		0–0	4–0			4–0	3–1			
River Plate		0–0			1–2	2–2			5–0		1–0	3–3		0–1		0–0			2–0	
San Lorenzo	4–0		0–0	1–0			2–1	0–1		2–1			2–2				2–1			1–2
San Martín (SJ)	2–1		4–0	1–2	1–1		0–1			0–0			4–0		0–2			2–2		0–3
Tigre			0–1				2–2	1–2	2–0			0–0		1–1	2–3	1–1				0–1
Unión				0–0		1–2		2–2	0–1	1–2		2–2		1–1		2–2	1–2	1–1		
Vélez Sarsfield		3–0			2–1	0–1	2–4		2–1		0–2			1–0	2–0				2–0	

Source: Programación de Primera División Torneo Inicial 2012/2013
Legend: Blue = home team win; Yellow = draw; Red = away team win.

=== Top goalscorers ===
Rank	Name	Nationality	Club	Goals
1	Facundo Ferreyra	Argentine	Vélez Sársfield	13
1	Ignacio Scocco	Argentine	Newell's Old Boys	13
3	Emanuel Gigliotti	Argentine	Colón	10
4	Martín Cauteruccio	Uruguayan	Quilmes	7
4	Lucas Pratto	Argentine	Vélez Sársfield	7
4	Denis Stracqualursi	Argentine	San Lorenzo	7
7	Iván Borghello	Argentine	All Boys	6
7	Rodrigo Mora	Uruguayan	River Plate	6
7	Humberto Osorio Botello	Colombian	San Martín (SJ)	6
7	Santiago Silva	Uruguayan	Boca Juniors	6
7	Duván Zapata	Colombian	Estudiantes (LP)	6

== Torneo Final ==
The Torneo Final was the second and final tournament of the season. It began on February 8 and ended on June 23, 2013.

=== Standings ===
Pos	Team	Pld	W	D	L	GF	GA	GD	Pts	Qualification
1	Newell's Old Boys (C)	19	12	2	5	40	21	+19	38	2014 Copa Libertadores Second Stage
2	River Plate	19	10	5	4	28	22	+6	35	
3	Lanús	19	8	9	2	26	14	+12	33	
4	San Lorenzo	19	8	8	3	26	16	+10	32	
5	Quilmes	19	8	7	4	28	22	+6	31	
6	Racing	19	8	5	6	24	17	+7	29	
7	Godoy Cruz	19	7	8	4	23	16	+7	29	
8	Arsenal	19	8	5	6	25	22	+3	29	
9	San Martín (SJ)	19	7	5	7	31	28	+3	26	
10	Belgrano	19	4	11	4	14	13	+1	23	
11	Atlético de Rafaela	19	5	8	6	21	23	−2	23	
12	Independiente	19	5	7	7	16	17	−1	22	
13	Tigre	19	6	3	10	22	30	−8	21	
14	Vélez Sarsfield	19	4	8	7	18	20	−2	20	
15	Estudiantes (LP)	19	4	8	7	15	19	−4	20	
16	All Boys	19	5	5	9	15	24	−9	20	
17	Colón	19	5	5	9	20	30	−10	20	
18	Argentinos Juniors	19	4	6	9	13	21	−8	18	
19	Boca Juniors	19	3	9	7	13	29	−16	18	
20	Unión	19	3	8	8	17	31	−14	17	

(C) Champions

Primera División
2013 Torneo Final champion

6th title

=== Results ===
Home \ Away	ALL	ARJ	ARS	ATR	BEL	BOC	COL	EST	GCR	IND	LAN	NOB	QUI	RAC	RIV	SLO	SMJ	TIG	USF	VEL
All Boys				2–1		2–0		0–0	1–1	2–0		2–1		0–1		0–3	1–1			
Argentinos Juniors	1–0		1–2	0–0	1–3		1–0				1–2		1–3		2–0					0–1
Arsenal	4–0			0–0				1–0		1–0		2–0	1–2	1–0		1–3	3–2	3–2		
Atlético de Rafaela						1–1		0–2	1–2	2–0		0–3		3–0		0–0	2–1		1–0	
Belgrano	0–1		1–1	0–0			2–1			0–0			3–0		1–2		0–2			1–0
Boca Juniors		1–1	1–0		0–0		1–0				0–0		3–2		1–1				1–3	1–1
Colón	2–0		1–0	2–2				3–3		1–1			0–3			0–1	1–1	3–2		2–1
Estudiantes (LP)		0–0			1–1	1–0			0–0		2–0	2–4		0–1		1–1		1–3	1–0	
Godoy Cruz		0–0	3–0		0–0	1–1	3–0				0–1				1–2			0–1	2–1	3–1
Independiente		3–1				1–1		0–0	0–1			1–3		2–0		0–1	3–1		1–1	
Lanús	2–1		2–1	1–1	0–0		4–0			0–0			2–2		5–1					1–0
Newell's Old Boys		0–1			2–0	4–0	1–2		3–1		0–3			4–3	1–0			3–1	5–0	
Quilmes	2–1			3–3				1–0	0–0	0–0		1–1		1–0		1–2	0–0			
Racing		2–0			1–1	2–0	1–1		1–1		0–0				0–2			2–0	3–0	0–0
River Plate	2–0		1–1	3–0			2–1	1–0		2–1			1–1				3–1	3–2		0–0
San Lorenzo		1–1			0–0	3–0			1–1		2–2	0–1		1–4	2–0			0–1	4–2	
San Martín (SJ)		2–1				6–1		2–0	2–3		3–1	1–1		0–3		0–0			3–1	
Tigre	2–1	1–0		1–3	0–0	0–0				0–2	0–0		2–3				1–3		1–2	
Unión	1–1	0–0	1–1		1–1		1–0				0–0		0–3		2–2					1–1
Vélez Sarsfield	0–0		2–2	2–1				1–1		0–1		1–3	2–0			1–1	3–0	1–2		

Legend: Blue = home team win; Yellow = draw; Red = away team win.

=== Top goalscorers ===
Rank	Name	Nationality	Club	Goals
1	Emanuel Gigliotti	Argentine	Colón	11
1	Ignacio Scocco	Argentine	Newell's Old Boys	11
3	Silvio Romero	Argentine	Lanús	9
4	Luciano Vietto	Argentine	Racing	8
5	Martín Cauteruccio	Uruguayan	Quilmes	7
5	Ezequiel Rescaldani	Argentine	Vélez Sarsfield	7
5	Duván Zapata	Colombian	Estudiantes (LP)	7
8	Andrés Franzoia	Argentine	Unión	6
8	Mauro Obolo	Argentine	Godoy Cruz	6
8	Claudio Riaño	Argentine	San Martín (SJ)	6

== Superfinal ==
The 2012-13 Superfinal was played on 29 June 2013 between Vélez Sarsfield, winners of the 2012 Torneo Inicial, and Newell's Old Boys, winners of the 2013 Torneo Final. The match was played at the neutral venue of the Estadio Malvinas Argentinas in Mendoza.

Vélez Sarsfield were crowned Super champions after a 1–0 victory over Newell's Old Boys. The Association recognised that title as a Primera División (league) championship.

As super champions of the 2012–13 season Vélez Sarsfield was qualified for the 2013 Supercopa Argentina, 2013 Copa Sudamericana and 2014 Copa Libertadores.

=== Details ===
2012–13 Primera División Superfinal
June 29, 2013
18:00 UTC−3

Vélez Sarsfield	1–0	Newell's Old Boys
Pratto 8'	Report

Estadio Malvinas Argentinas, Mendoza
Referee: Néstor Pitana

Vélez Sarsfield	Newell's Old Boys

GK	13	(Uruguay) Sebastián Sosa	(yellow card) 70'
DF	5	(Argentina) Fabián Cubero (c)	(yellow card) 9' (yellow-red card) 27'
DF	2	(Argentina) Fernando Tobio
DF	6	(Argentina) Sebastián Domínguez (c)
DF	3	(Argentina) Emiliano Papa	(yellow card) 45'
MF	24	(Argentina) Iván Bella		(substituted off) 29'
MF	17	(Argentina) Franco Razzotti	(yellow card) 90+1'
MF	8	(Argentina) Fernando Gago		(substituted off) 71'
MF	10	(Argentina) Federico Insúa	(yellow card) 76'
FW	12	(Argentina) Lucas Pratto		(substituted off) 67'
FW	14	(Argentina) Facundo Ferreyra
Substitutes:
GK	1	(Argentina) Germán Montoya
DF	30	(Argentina) Juan Sabia
DF	4	(Argentina) Gino Peruzzi		(substituted on) 29'
MF	18	(Argentina) Francisco Cerro		(substituted on) 71'
MF	21	(Argentina) Agustín Allione
MF	29	(Argentina) Lucas Romero		(substituted on) 67'
FW	9	(Argentina) Ezequiel Rescaldani
Manager:
(Argentina) Ricardo Gareca

GK	1	(Argentina) Nahuel Guzmán
DF	4	(Paraguay) Marcos Cáceres
DF	27	(Argentina) Santiago Vergini	(yellow card) 5'
DF	20	(Argentina) Gabriel Heinze
DF	15	(Argentina) Milton Casco
MF	8	(Argentina) Pablo Pérez	(yellow card) 9'	(substituted off) 71'
MF	7	(Argentina) Lucas Bernardi (c)
MF	14	(Peru) Rinaldo Cruzado	(yellow card) 63'	(substituted off) 63'
FW	11	(Argentina) Maxi Rodríguez
FW	32	(Argentina) Ignacio Scocco
FW	16	(Argentina) Víctor Figueroa
Substitutes:
GK	22	(Argentina) Sebastián Peratta
DF	6	(Argentina) Víctor López
MF	5	(Argentina) Diego Mateo
MF	28	(Argentina) Martín Tonso		(substituted on) 63'
MF	18	(Argentina) Horacio Orzán
FW	37	(Argentina) Maximiliano Urruti		(substituted on) 71'
FW	39	(Argentina) Fabián Muñoz
Manager:
(Argentina) Gerardo Martino

Assistant referees:
Diego Bonfá
Iván Núñez
Fourth official:
Mauro Vigliano

Match rules

- 90 minutes.
- 30 minutes of extra time if necessary.
- Penalty shoot-out if scores still level.
- Seven named substitutes.
- Maximum of three substitutions.

- Sebastián Sosa (Vélez Sarsfield) saved a penalty kick from Scocco in the 30th.

Primera División
2012–13 Superfinal champion

10th title

== Relegation ==
Pos	Team	2010–11 Pts	2011–12 Pts	2012–13 Pts	Total Pts	Total Pld	Avg	Relegation
1	Vélez Sarsfield	82	64	61	207	114	1.816	
2	River Plate	—	—	64	64	38	1.684	
3	Lanús	63	55	67	185	114	1.623	
4	Boca Juniors	53	76	51	180	114	1.579	
5	Arsenal	57	62	60	179	114	1.57	
6	Belgrano	—	55	59	114	76	1.5	
7	Estudiantes (LP)	69	50	48	167	114	1.465	
8	Newell's Old Boys	42	48	74	164	114	1.439	
9	Racing	52	50	62	164	114	1.439	
10	Colón	47	60	46	153	114	1.342	
11	Godoy Cruz	63	38	49	150	114	1.316	
12	Quilmes	—	—	50	50	38	1.316	
13	San Lorenzo	47	44	58	149	114	1.307	
14	Tigre	50	63	34	147	114	1.289	
15	All Boys	51	54	41	146	114	1.281	
16	Argentinos Juniors	54	49	37	140	114	1.228	
17	Atlético de Rafaela	—	50	43	93	76	1.224	
18	San Martín (SJ) (R)	—	48	43	91	76	1.197	Primera B Nacional
19	Independiente (R)	43	47	39	129	114	1.132	Primera B Nacional
20	Unión (R)	—	50	24	74	76	0.974	Primera B Nacional

== International qualification ==
=== 2013 Copa Libertadores ===
Qualification for the 2013 Copa Libertadores tournament was awarded to the winners of the 2011/12 Clausura and 2012/13 Torneo Inicial tournaments. A third place was awarded to the Argentine side that proceeded furthest in the 2012 Copa Sudamericana tournament. Two more places were available to the teams who gain most points in the 2012 Argentine tournaments, and a league table showing those combined points is given below.

Pos	Team	Pld	W	D	L	GF	GA	GD	Pts	Qualification
1	Vélez Sarsfield	38	22	8	8	57	27	+30	74	2013 Copa Libertadores Second Stage (Note: Arsenal and Vélez Sársfield are qualified for the 2013 Copa Libertadores as the 2011/12 Clausura and 2012/13 Torneo Inicial champions respectively.)
2	Arsenal	38	20	9	9	49	37	+12	69	2013 Copa Libertadores Second Stage
3	Newell's Old Boys	38	18	14	6	49	30	+19	68	2013 Copa Libertadores Second Stage
4	Boca Juniors	38	18	12	8	55	40	+15	66	2013 Copa Libertadores Second Stage
5	Lanús	38	17	9	12	42	28	+14	60	
6	Belgrano	38	16	12	10	39	33	+6	60	
7	Colón	38	13	16	9	50	42	+8	55	
8	Estudiantes (LP)	38	15	10	13	42	40	+2	55	
9	All Boys	38	14	12	12	40	40	0	54	
10	Racing	38	14	10	14	45	39	+6	52	
11	San Lorenzo	38	12	15	11	42	42	0	51	
12	Tigre	38	11	16	11	45	42	+3	49	2013 Copa Libertadores First Stage (Note: Tigre is qualified for the 2013 Copa Libertadores as the best Argentine team in the 2012 Copa Sudamericana.)
13	Argentinos Juniors	38	11	13	14	36	44	−8	46	
14	Atlético de Rafaela	38	11	11	16	46	55	−9	44	
15	San Martín (SJ)	38	10	9	19	42	56	−14	39	
16	Independiente	38	8	13	17	38	52	−14	37	
17	Godoy Cruz	38	7	13	18	24	49	−25	34	
18	Unión	38	5	17	16	37	52	−15	32	
19	River Plate	19	7	8	4	28	16	+12	29	
20	Quilmes	19	3	10	6	16	23	−7	19	

=== 2013 Copa Sudamericana ===
Qualification for the 2013 Copa Sudamericana tournament was awarded to the winners of the 2012–13 Argentine Primera División and the 5 best non-finalists (if not qualified for 2013 Copa Libertadores second stage or relegated) according to the aggregate table of the 2012–13 Torneo Inicial and Torneo Final.

This aggregate table could also be used for award places for the 2014 Copa Libertadores.

Pos	Team	Pld	W	D	L	GF	GA	GD	Pts	Qualification
1	Newell's Old Boys	38	21	11	6	63	32	+31	74	2013 Copa Libertadores Second Stage
2	Lanús (Q)	38	18	13	7	49	24	+25	67	2013 Copa Sudamericana Second Stage
3	River Plate (Q)	38	17	13	8	56	38	+18	64	2013 Copa Sudamericana Second Stage
4	Racing (Q)	38	17	11	10	50	29	+21	62	2013 Copa Sudamericana Second Stage
5	Vélez Sarsfield (Q)	38	17	10	11	49	32	+17	61	2013 Copa Libertadores Second Stage and 2013 Copa Sudamericana Second Stage (Note: Vélez Sarsfield is qualified for the 2013 Copa Sudamericana as the 2012–13 Primera División super champion.)
6	Arsenal	38	17	9	12	44	44	0	60	2013 Copa Libertadores Second Stage
7	Belgrano (Q)	38	14	17	7	36	26	+10	59	2013 Copa Sudamericana Second Stage
8	San Lorenzo (Q)	38	14	16	8	46	36	+10	58	2013 Copa Sudamericana Second Stage
9	Boca Juniors	38	12	15	11	38	49	−11	51	2013 Copa Libertadores Second Stage
10	Quilmes	38	11	17	10	44	45	−1	50	
11	Godoy Cruz	38	12	13	13	36	40	−4	49	
12	Estudiantes (LP)	38	12	12	14	34	35	−1	48	
13	Colón	38	11	13	14	46	54	−8	46	
14	San Martín (SJ)	38	11	10	17	52	55	−3	43	
15	Atlético de Rafaela	38	10	13	15	41	51	−10	43	
16	All Boys	38	10	11	17	34	51	−17	41	
17	Independiente	38	8	15	15	32	41	−9	39	
18	Argentinos Juniors	38	8	13	17	32	50	−18	37	
19	Tigre	38	7	13	18	38	57	−19	34	2013 Copa Libertadores Second Stage
20	Unión	38	3	15	20	33	64	−31	24	

Rules for classification: Rules for classification: 1st points; 2nd goal difference; 3rd goals scored; 4th head-to-head points; 5th head-to-head goal difference; 6th head-to-head goals scored.
(Q) Qualified for the phase indicated
