= Germán Montoya =

Argentine footballer

Personal information
- Full name: Marcelo Germán Montoya
- Date of birth: 23 January 1983 (age 43)
- Place of birth: Córdoba, Argentina
- Height: 1.85 m (6 ft 1 in)
- Position: Goalkeeper

Team information
- Current team: Club Atlético Argentino Peñarol

Youth career
- Belgrano

Senior career*
Years	Team	Apps	(Gls)
2000–2007	Belgrano	76	(0)
2007–2013	Vélez Sársfield	106	(0)
2013–2014	Colón	37	(0)
2014–2016	Independiente	0	(0)
2016	Atletico Rafaela	8	(0)
2016–2018	Belgrano	1	(0)
2018-2021	Estudiantes de San Luis	51	(0)
2021-2022	Club Aurora	23	(0)
2022	Villa Dálmine	10	(0)
2022-2022	Agropecuario	0	(0)
2022-2024	FADEP (Mendoza)	16	(0)
2024-2025	CS Estudiantes (San Luis)	0	(0)
2025-	Club Atlético Argentino Peñarol	5	(0)
- * Club domestic league appearances and goals as of 21:00, 15 December 2025

Marcelo Germán Montoya (born 23 January 1983) is an Argentine professional footballer who plays as a goalkeeper for Agropecuario.

== Club career ==
Montoya started his professional career with Belgrano in the 2000 Apertura of the Primera División. He became a starter for Belgrano during the 2006 Clausura of the Primera B Nacional (second division), relegating Colombian international Róbinson Zapata to the bench. Belgrano was promoted at the end of the season and Montoya played his first full season in the first division in the 2006–07. However, his team was relegated at the end of the season.

After Belgrano's relegation, Montoya stayed in the first division, being transferred to Vélez Sársfield. At first, he was a substitute for Sebastián Peratta, but became a starter from the 12th fixture onwards due to a knee injury suffered by Peratta. During the 2008 Apertura, Montoya was originally a starter, but was relegated by Marcelo Barovero by the end of the tournament. Subsequently, when Ricardo Gareca replaced Hugo Tocalli as the team's coach for the 2009 Clausura, Montoya regained his position as a starter. Vélez won the tournament and Montoya had the lowest goals-to-games ratio, therefore being awarded the Ubaldo Fillol Award.

During the 2010 Apertura, Montoya lost his place again to Barovero, and played only when the new starter was injured. He was later an un-used substitute in Vélez' 2011 Clausura winning campaign.

In 2016, Montoya signed for Atletico Rafaela. Six months later, he rejoined former club Belgrano.

== Honours ==
Vélez Sársfield

- Argentine Primera División (4): 2009 Clausura, 2011 Clausura, 2012 Inicial, 2012–13 Superfinal

Individual

- Ubaldo Fillol Award (1): 2009 Clausura (with Vélez Sársfield)
