= Jorge Bianco =

Argentine footballer

Personal information
- Full name: Jorge Eduardo Bianco
- Date of birth: April 28, 1956 (age 70)
- Place of birth: Villa Constitución, Santa Fe, Argentina

Senior career*
Years	Team	Apps	(Gls)
1976–1977	River Plate	13	(0)
1976	→ All Boys (loan)	4	(1)
1978	Universidad Católica		
1979–1980	San Marcos de Arica		
1981–1982	Talleres de Córdoba	15	(3)
1982	Rosario Central	23	(3)
1983	San Marcos de Arica		
1984	Cúcuta Deportivo		
1985	Central Norte	2	(0)
1986	Ferro Carril Oeste	30	(4)
1988–1992	Alianza		
1993	Meteor		
- * Club domestic league appearances and goals

Jorge Eduardo Bianco (born April 28, 1956, in Villa Constitución) is an Argentine former professional footballer who played as a midfielder for clubs in Argentina, Chile, Colombia, El Salvador and Peru.

== Teams ==
- River Plate 1976
- All Boys 1976
- River Plate 1977
- Universidad Católica 1978
- San Marcos de Arica 1979–1980
- Talleres de Córdoba 1981–1982
- Rosario Central 1982
- San Marcos de Arica 1983
- Cúcuta Deportivo 1984
- Central Norte 1985
- Ferro Carril Oeste 1986–1987
- Alianza 1988–1992
- Meteor 1993
