= Diego Mateo =

Argentine footballer

Personal information
- Full name: Diego Mateo Alustiza
- Date of birth: 7 August 1978 (age 48)
- Place of birth: Roldán, Argentina
- Height: 1.78 m (5 ft 10 in)
- Position: Defensive midfielder

Senior career*
Years	Team	Apps	(Gls)
1996–2000	Newell's Old Boys	92	(4)
2000–2001	Lecce	8	(0)
2001–2004	Racing Santander	90	(4)
2005	Valladolid	18	(0)
2005–2006	San Lorenzo	26	(0)
2006–2007	Hércules	27	(0)
2007–2009	Gimnasia Jujuy	58	(1)
2009–2017	Newell's Old Boys	172	(3)
- * Club domestic league appearances and goals

Diego Mateo Alustiza (born 7 August 1978) is an Argentine former professional footballer who played as a defensive midfielder.

== Football career ==
Born in Roldán, Santa Fe, Mateo started his professional career in 1996 with Newell's Old Boys, where he made over 100 overall appearances, scoring four goals in the top division. In 2000, he joined U.S. Lecce in Italy, but left the club after appearing in only one fourth of the Serie A games during the season, with the Apulia side narrowly avoiding relegation.

In 2001 Mateo moved to Spain, where he would spend a great portion of his career: first, he was instrumental in helping Racing de Santander return to La Liga by scoring four times in 32 matches, and was relatively used in the following two top flight campaigns. In January 2005 he returned to the second division, playing for Real Valladolid.

Mateo returned to Argentina for a spell at San Lorenzo de Almagro, then went again to Spain and its second level after signing with Hércules CF. He then played two years in his country with Gimnasia y Esgrima de Jujuy but, after the team's relegation in 2009, the 31-year-old returned to his first club Newell's.

== Honours ==
Newell's Old Boys

- Primera División: 2013 Final
