= Carlos Kletnicki =

Argentine footballer

Personal information
- Full name: Carlos José Kletnicki
- Date of birth: 13 April 1983 (age 43)
- Place of birth: Azul, Argentina
- Height: 1.83 m (6 ft 0 in)
- Position: Goalkeeper

Youth career
- 1994–2001: Gimnasia LP

Senior career*
Years	Team	Apps	(Gls)
2002–2009	Gimnasia LP	44	(0)
2006	→ Villa Dálmine (loan)	9	(0)
2009	Unión Santa Fe	3	(0)
2009–2011	Boston River	22	(0)
2011–2014	Deportes Concepción	71	(0)
2014–2016	Villa Dálmine	83	(0)
2017	Murciélagos	6	(0)
2018–2019	Acassuso	40	(0)
2019–2020	Fénix	23	(0)
2020	Argentino de Merlo	7	(0)
2021	Excursionistas	20	(0)
2022	Sportivo Italiano	5	(0)
2023	Villa Dálmine	13	(0)
- * Club domestic league appearances and goals

Carlos José Kletnicki (Spanish pronunciation: [ˈkaɾlos xoˈse kleðˈniki], born 13 April 1983) is an Argentine former football player who played as a goalkeeper.

== Club career ==
With little chance of playing as first goalkeeper at Gimnasia y Esgrima de La Plata, where he started in the youth division, he was transferred on loan to Villa Dálmine (Primera C Metropolitana) for six months. In the second half of 2006, thanks to a good performance in a turbulent moment in Gimnasia in the 2006 Apertura Tournament, he earned the goalkeeper position displacing Juan Carlos Olave. Kletnicki was subsequently relegated to backup keeper to first Sebastián Cejas and later Gaston Sessa.

Abroad, Kletnicki played for Uruguayan club Boston River, the Chilean club Deportes Concepción and the Mexican club Murciélagos.

He retired in October 2023.

== Personal life ==
Carlos is the son of the dentist, politician and former football goalkeeper Luis Alberto Kletnicki.
