= Leandro Caruso =

Argentine association football player

Personal information
- Full name: Leandro Rubén Caruso
- Date of birth: 14 July 1981 (age 45)
- Place of birth: Avellaneda, Argentina
- Height: 1.84 m (6 ft 0 in)
- Position: Striker

Youth career
- Independiente
- Dock Sud
- Racing Club (futsal)

Senior career*
Years	Team	Apps	(Gls)
2001–2005	Arsenal de Sarandí	56	(6)
2004–2005	→ Pioneros de Obregón (loan)	40	(15)
2006	El Porvenir	9	(1)
2006	Tijuana	12	(3)
2007	Real Colima	11	(3)
2008–2009	Godoy Cruz	47	(19)
2009–2012	Udinese	0	(0)
2009–2010	→ Vélez Sársfield (loan)	21	(3)
2010–2011	→ River Plate (loan)	25	(4)
2011–2012	→ Godoy Cruz (loan)	27	(5)
2012–2013	Argentinos Juniors	21	(0)
2013–2014	Huracán	37	(9)
2014–2015	All Boys	11	(1)
2015	Godoy Cruz	6	(0)
2016	Juventud Unida Universitario	18	(4)
2018–2022	Dock Sud		
- * Club domestic league appearances and goals

Leandro Rubén Caruso (born 14 July 1982) is an Argentine former football striker.

== Career ==
Caruso started playing for Independiente's youth divisions, in his native city of Avellaneda. Later, following his brother Hernán's footsteps, he played futsal in Racing. After seeing some success, he returned to the big field training with Racing's reserves.

In 2001, he started his professional career with Arsenal de Sarandí. He was part of the squad that won promotion to the Argentine Primera in 2002. He then played for several lower league teams in Mexico, including Pioneros de Ciudad Obregón, Tijuana and Real Colima; as well as El Porvenir in the Primera B Nacional (Argentine second division).

In 2008, he returned to Argentina to join Godoy Cruz of the 2nd division, where he helped the club to secure promotion to the Primera. He maintained his good form when playing in the first division, scoring 14 goals in the 2008–09 season.

On 9 June 2009, Udinese Calcio signed the Argentine forward from Godoy Cruz on a 5-year deal, to officially join the club after the season. The deal was made in €4,000,000. Caruso played the last game for Godoy Cruz on 21 June 2009.

On 19 August 2009, Vélez Sársfield signed the Argentine forward on loan from Udinese for one season, with an option to buy. Caruso had his first great game with Vélez in the 2–2 away draw against Unión Española on the 2009 Copa Sudamericana, where he scored twice to secure Vélez' comeback from a 0–2. The team qualified for the next stage with a 5–4 global victory. On 19 June 2010, River Plate loaned the Argentine forward from Udinese until 30 June 2011. On 12 August 2011, Caruso joined Godoy Cruz, where he spent the 2008–2009 season, on a season-long loan deal.
