= Juan Carlos Olave =

Argentine footballer

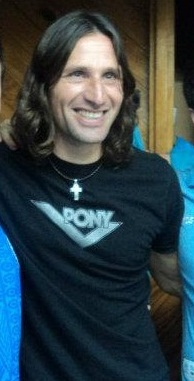
- Olave in 2013

Personal information
- Full name: Juan Carlos Olave
- Date of birth: 21 February 1976 (age 50)
- Place of birth: Córdoba, Argentina
- Height: 1.86 m (6 ft 1 in)
- Position: Goalkeeper

Senior career*
Years	Team	Apps	(Gls)
1997–2002	Belgrano	38	(0)
1998	→ Bolívar (loan)	8	(0)
2002–2004	Gimnasia LP	73	(0)
2004–2007	Murcia	12	(0)
2006	→ River Plate (loan)	0	(0)
2006–2007	→ Gimnasia LP (loan)	12	(0)
2007–2016	Belgrano	331	(0)
Total		474	(0)
- * Club domestic league appearances and goals

Juan Carlos Olave (born 21 February 1976) is an Argentine retired footballer who played as a goalkeeper.

He spent most of his professional career with Belgrano.

== Club career ==
Born in Córdoba in the namesake province, Olave started playing professionally with hometown's Club Atlético Belgrano, also having a brief loan spell in Bolivia with Club Bolívar. After the former was relegated to the second division in 2002 he moved to Club de Gimnasia y Esgrima La Plata, where he first established as a Primera División player.

In 2004, Olave joined Real Murcia in the Spanish second level, where he served as backup. Upon returning to Gimnasia he continued as a starter, but was relegated to the bench after several off-key performances; his replacement, Carlos Kletnicki, did not convince new manager Francisco Maturana, who required that a new goalkeeper be acquired in the next transfer window, and Sebastián Cejas was brought in from Colo-Colo.

Olave then returned for another spell at Belgrano, in the winter of 2007 – previously, he had been transfer listed by the club which had the player's rights, Murcia, with Club Atlético Vélez Sarsfield being the main contender for his services. He moved to Belgrano, however, and on 13 March 2009 reached league the 100-game mark with the side, who still competed in division two.

Belgrano eventually returned to the top flight. On 26 June 2011, in the relegation playoffs against Club Atlético River Plate, he saved a penalty from Mariano Pavone in an eventual 1–1 away draw, with his team winning 3–1 on aggregate and sending the opposition to the second division for the first time in their history.

In November 2012, during a game against Club Atlético Independiente, Olave was hit by a firecracker thrown onto the field by a fan. The match was suspended. On 18 December 2016, after a further five top flight seasons with his main club, the 40-year-old retired from the game; from 30 April 2017 until 7 March 2019, he was Belgrano's sporting director.

== Personal life ==
Olave was a cousin to musician Rodrigo.

== Honours ==
=== Individual ===
- Ubaldo Fillol Award (lowest "goals-to-games" ratio): Final 2013
