= Marcelo Barovero =

Argentine footballer (born 1984)

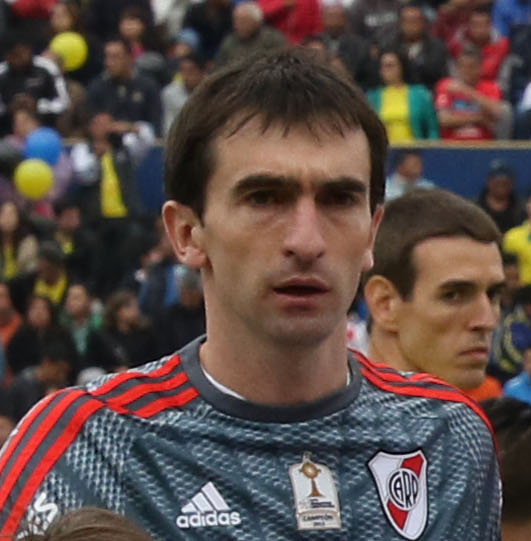
- Barovero lining up for River Plate in 2016

Personal information
- Full name: Marcelo Alberto Barovero
- Date of birth: 18 February 1984 (age 42)
- Place of birth: Porteña, Córdoba, Argentina
- Height: 1.82 m (6 ft 0 in)
- Position: Goalkeeper

Senior career*
Years	Team	Apps	(Gls)
2003–2007	Atlético de Rafaela	117	(0)
2007–2008	Huracán	38	(0)
2008–2012	Vélez Sarsfield	90	(0)
2012–2016	River Plate	118	(0)
2016–2018	Necaxa	72	(0)
2018–2020	Monterrey	74	(0)
2020–2021	Burgos	25	(0)
2021–2023	Atlético San Luis	67	(0)
2023–2024	Banfield	16	(0)
Total		617	(0)
- * Club domestic league appearances and goals

Marcelo Alberto Barovero (born 18 February 1984) is an Argentine former professional footballer who played as a goalkeeper. He often goes by the nickname of "Trapito" (Spanish for "Little Rag").

== Career ==
=== Early years ===
His first steps in the practice of football were at the club of his hometown, Porteña Asociación Cultural y Deportiva, then he played at the youth academy of Atlético de Rafaela until his professional debut.

=== Atlético Rafaela ===
Barovero started his professional career in 2003 playing for Atlético de Rafaela in the Primera B Nacional (Argentine second division). In his first season, the club won the championship and promotion to the Primera División. Barovero was used as the club's third choice goalkeeper in the first division, behind Ángel David Comizzo and Ezequiel Medrán. Rafaela was relegated at the end of the 2003–04 season, but Barovero stayed with the club and established himself as the first choice goalkeeper back in the B Nacional. He totalled 113 appearances for Atlético de Rafaela, before his move to Huracán (of the first division) in 2007.

=== Huracán ===
In the 2007–08 season, he played all the 38 matches that his team disputed. At the end of this season, he was bought by Vélez Sársfield.

=== Velez Sarsfield ===
In 2008, after one season as a starter in Huracán, Barovero was bought by Vélez Sársfield to compete with Germán Montoya for the position of first choice goalkeeper. During the 2009 Clausura he was part of the Vélez team that won the championship, being an unused substitute during the tournament.

He eventually caught his break during the 2010 Apertura, during which he started in all but three games of his team's runner-up campaign. He finished the tournament with only 6 goals conceded in 16 games, and kept a clean sheet in 12 of the games. At the end of the tournament, he was awarded the Ubaldo Matildo Fillol Award for being the goalkeeper with the lowest goals-to-games ratio. The following semester, Barovero started in all 19 games of Vélez 2011 Clausura winning campaign, and all 12 of the team's Copa Libertadores semifinalist campaign.

=== River Plate ===
After his successful spell in Velez, in the 2012 Argentine winter transfer window giant River Plate picked him up for a US$250,000 season-long loan. He soon became the undisputed starting goalkeeper during his first semester at the club, and upon completion of the loan, River made his move permanent for a reported fee of US$950,000. Since then he's been one of the stars of the Argentine side and was named Man of the Match in more than one occasion, but most notably on an intense fixture in the 2013 Copa Sudamericana against Buenos Aires rivals San Lorenzo to advance to the Round of Sixteen. He won multiple titles with the squad, most notably the 2015 Copa Libertadores. The fans consider him an idol of the team.

=== Later career ===
In 2016, Barovero moved abroad for the first time in his career and joined Mexican club Necaxa. He went on to play for Monterrey, Burgos and Atlético San Luis before returning to Argentina to join Banfield.

On 19 July 2024, Barovero announced his retirement from professional football.

== Career statistics ==
As of match played 14 February 2021

Appearances and goals by club, season and competition
Club	Season	League			Cup		Continental		Other		Total	
Club	Season	Division	Apps	Goals	Apps	Goals	Apps	Goals	Apps	Goals	Apps	Goals
Atlético de Rafaela	2003–04	Argentine Primera División	0	0	—		—		—		0	0
Atlético de Rafaela	2004–05	Primera B Nacional	37	0	—		—		2 (Note: Appearance(s) in Primera División Promotion)	0	39	0
Atlético de Rafaela	2005–06	Primera B Nacional	38	0	—		—		—		38	0
Atlético de Rafaela	2006–07	Primera B Nacional	42	0	—		—		—		42	0
Atlético de Rafaela	Total		117	0	0	0	0	0	2	0	119	0
Huracán	2007–08	Argentine Primera División	38	0	—		—		—		38	0
Vélez Sarsfield	2008–09	Argentine Primera División	9	0	—		—		—		9	0
Vélez Sarsfield	2009–10	Argentine Primera División	11	0	—		2 (Note: One appearance in Copa Sudamericana and one appearance in Copa Libertadores)	0	—		13	0
Vélez Sarsfield	2010–11	Argentine Primera División	35	0	—		20 (Note: Eight appearances in Copa Sudamericana and twelve appearances in Copa Libertadores)	0	—		55	0
Vélez Sarsfield	2011–12	Argentine Primera División	35	0	0	0	9 (Note: Appearance(s) in Copa Libertadores)	0	—		44	0
Vélez Sarsfield	Total		90	0	0	0	31	0	0	0	121	0
River Plate	2012–13	Argentine Primera División	34	0	0	0	5 (Note: Appearance(s) in Copa Sudamericana)	0	—		39	0
River Plate	2013–14	Argentine Primera División	34	0	1	0	0	0	—		35	0
River Plate	2014	Argentine Primera División	18	0	1	0	10	0	1 (Note: Appearance in Supercopa Argentina)	0	30	0
River Plate	2015	Argentine Primera División	19	0	0	0	18 (Note: Six appearances in Copa Sudamericana and twelve appearances in Copa Libertadores)	0	5 (Note: Two appearances in Recopa Sudamericana, one appearance in J.League Cup / Copa Sudamericana Championship and two appearances in FIFA Club World Cup)	0	42	0
River Plate	2016	Argentine Primera División	13	0	0	0	8	0	—		21	0
River Plate	Total		118	0	2	0	41	0	6	0	167	0
Necaxa	2016–17	Liga MX	38	0	0	0	—		—		38	0
Necaxa	2017–18	Liga MX	34	0	1	0	—		—		35	0
Necaxa	Total		72	0	1	0	0	0	0	0	73	0
Monterrey	2018–19	Liga MX	40	0	1	0	8 (Note: Appearance(s) in CONCACAF Champions League)	0	2 (Note: Appearance(s) in FIFA Club World Cup)	0	51	0
Monterrey	2019–20	Liga MX	34	0	0	0	—		—		34	0
Monterrey	Total		74	0	1	0	8	0	2	0	85	0
Burgos	2020–21	Segunda División B	14	0	1	0	—		—		15	0
Career total			523	0	5	0	80	0	10	0	618	0

== Honours ==
Atlético Rafaela

- Primera B Nacional: 2002–03

Vélez Sársfield

- Argentine Primera División: 2009 Clausura, 2011 Clausura

River Plate

- Argentine Primera División: 2014 Final
- Copa Campeonato: 2013–14
- Copa Libertadores: 2015
- Copa Sudamericana: 2014
- Recopa Sudamericana: 2015
- Suruga Bank Championship: 2015
- FIFA Club World Cup runner-up: 2015

Necaxa

- Copa MX: Clausura 2018

Monterrey

- Liga MX: Apertura 2019
- CONCACAF Champions League: 2019

Individual

- Ubaldo Fillol Award : 2010 Apertura, 2011 Clausura, 2013 Inicial, 2014 Primera División
- Copa Sudamericana Best Player: 2014
- Liga MX Golden Glove: 2017–18
- CONCACAF Champions League Golden Glove: 2019
- CONCACAF Champions League Team of the Tournament: 2019
