= Cristian Lucchetti =

Argentine footballer

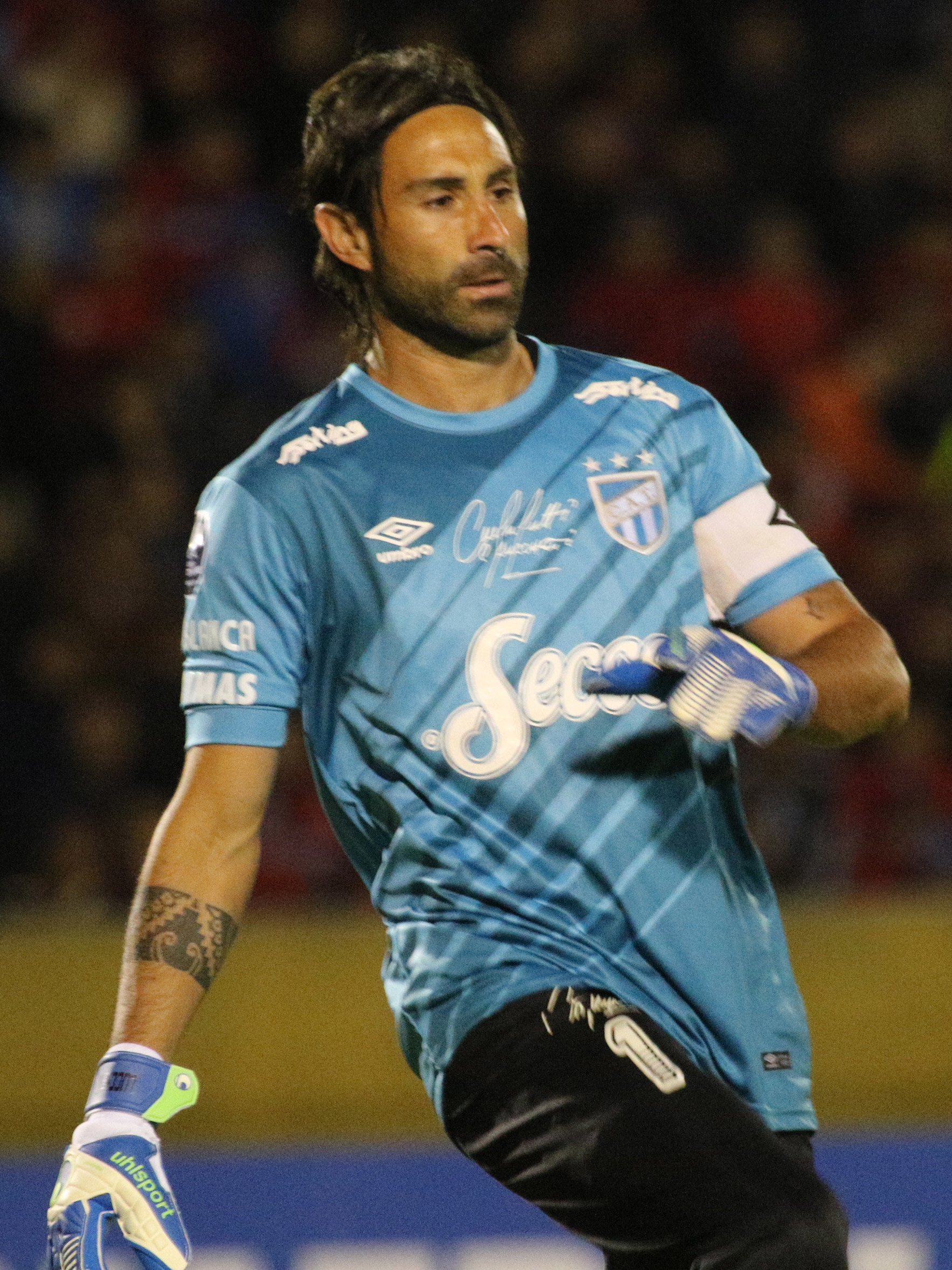
- Lucchetti with Atlético Tucumán in 2017

Personal information
- Full name: Cristian David Lucchetti
- Date of birth: June 26, 1978 (age 48)
- Place of birth: Luján de Cuyo, Argentina
- Height: 1.80 m (5 ft 11 in)
- Position: Goalkeeper

Senior career*
Years	Team	Apps	(Gls)
1995–1996	Luján de Cuyo	30	(0)
1996–2002	Banfield	93	(5)
2003–2004	Santos Laguna	30	(1)
2004–2005	Racing	36	(2)
2005–2012	Banfield	208	(16)
2010–2011	→ Boca Juniors (loan)	26	(0)
2012–2021	Atlético Tucumán	256	(1)
2022–2023	Gimnasia Jujuy	22	(0)
Total		701	(25)
- * Club domestic league appearances and goals

Cristian David Lucchetti (born 26 June 1978) is an Argentine professional footballer who played as a goalkeeper.

== Career ==
Lucchetti started his professional career in 1995 playing for his hometown team Luján de Cuyo, who at the time played in Argentine regional tournaments. In 1996, he moved to Banfield and made his debut in the Primera División the same year. After two years in Banfield, he was transferred to Santos Laguna in Mexico where he played in the Mexican Primera División and in the 2004 Copa Libertadores.

In 2004, he returned to Argentina to play for Racing Club. In 2005, Lucchetti returned to his former club Banfield, where he became one of the club's goalscorers by taking penalties. In 2009, he was the first team goalkeeper of the first Banfield team ever to win an Argentine championship, keeping goal in every game of the Apertura 2009 championship.

On 11 June 2010, the 31-year-old goalkeeper left Banfield and joined on loan with a selling option to Boca Juniors.

In July 2011, he returns to Banfield for playing the 2011–2012 season, finishing last over 20 teams and being relegated to 2nd Division after 11 seasons and winning the Apertura 2009.

In July 2012, Lucchetti signed with Atlético Tucumán where he played for 9 years, until December 2021. On 11 January, Lucchetti was signed to play in the Primera Nacional for Gimnasia Jujuy.

According to IFFHS, Lucchetti was the second-oldest player in the world to play a match in the top tier of a national championship in 2021, aged 43 years and 169 days in his last Argentine Primera División game in 2021 against Atlético Tucumán on 12 December, only behind fellow goalkeeper Mohamed Abdel Monsef, who played in the Egyptian Premier League at the age of 44. In June 2023, it was announced that he will be leaving the team.

== Honours ==
Banfield

- Primera División: 2009 Apertura

Individual

- Ubaldo Fillol Award: 2009 Apertura
