= Nelson Ibáñez =

Argentine footballer

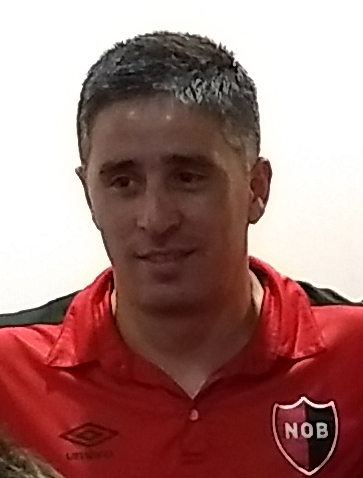
- Ibáñez with Newell's Old Boys in 2018

Personal information
- Full name: Nelson Martín Ibáñez
- Date of birth: November 13, 1981 (age 44)
- Place of birth: Mendoza, Argentina
- Height: 1.85 m (6 ft 1 in)
- Position: Goalkeeper

Youth career
- 2001–2004: Godoy Cruz

Senior career*
| Years | Team | Apps | (Gls) |
| 2004–2005 | Alumni | 16 | (0) |
| 2005–2013 | Godoy Cruz | 175 | (0) |
| 2013–2016 | Racing Club | 8 | (0) |
| 2016–2017 | Tigre | 19 | (0) |
| 2017–2020 | Newell's Old Boys | 15 | (0) |
| 2020–2022 | Godoy Cruz | 7 | (0) |

International career
| 2010 | Argentina | 1 | (0) |
- * Club domestic league appearances and goals

Nelson Martín Ibáñez (born 13 November 1981) is an Argentine former professional footballer who played as a goalkeeper.

== Career ==
=== Club career ===
Ibáñez joined Godoy Cruz in 2001 and played for their reserve side. In 2004, he was loaned to Alumni de Villa María of the regionalised 4th division of Argentine football.

Ibáñez returned to Godoy Cruz in 2005 and gradually established himself as the first choice goalkeeper. He played for the club in the 2nd division and was part of the team that won the Apertura 2005 championship. Following the club's promotion to the Primera División, he made his top flight debut on 28 August 2006 in a 0–0 draw against Gimnasia y Esgrima de Jujuy.

Godoy Cruz went down to the First National B after Closing 2007, but Ibáñez remained in the club. He returned to the top flight a year later, after finishing second in the championship behind San Martin de Tucuman.

On 14 April 2012, Ibáñez broke the streak of 19 penalty goals scored consecutively by Néstor Ortigoza, in a match in which Godoy Cruz fell 3–0 to San Lorenzo at La Bombonera, on the tenth day of Clausura 2012.

On 22 July 2013, Ibáñez became the new keeper of Racing Club, coming with the ball in his possession. He played his first game against Gimnasia de La Plata, which ended with 1–0. His second was to Argentinos Juniors, 1–0 victory, where he had a good performance; and his third game was a 2–0 loss to Atletico Rafaela. On December 14, Racing was named the champion of First Division Championship 2014 (Argentina), where Ibáñez played 2 games.

In 2015 they won the summer tournament, at the city of Mar del Plata Cup (where he played one game against Velez Sarsfield in the 1–0 victory) and the City of Avellaneda Cup. In the championship they tied their first game against River Plate with a score of 0-0.

On 28 May, he reached the quarterfinals of the Copa Libertadores, with Racing playing against Guarani, Ibáñez saved the match for the academy because their starting goalkeeper had just been expelled. Thus giving his team a chance to score 0–1 in Paraguay, unfortunately, despite the enormous sacrifice of the players, the team of Diego Cocca did not reach the finals.

=== International career ===
Ibáñez made his debut for the Argentina national team after being called up to join Diego Maradona's squad of Argentina-based players who beat Jamaica 2–1 on 10 February 2010.

== Honors ==
=== Godoy Cruz ===
- Primera B Nacional: 2005 Apertura

=== Individual ===
- Ubaldo Fillol Award: 2010 Clausura
