= Meir Benjamin Menahem Danon =

Personal life
- Born: c. 1770
- Died: November 22, 1854 Jerusalem, Damascus Eyalet, Ottoman Empire
- Buried: Mount of Olives, Jerusalem

Religious life
- Religion: Judaism
- Main work: Be'er ba-sadeh (1846)

Meir Benjamin Menahem Danon (Hebrew: מאיר בנימין מנחם דאנון, romanized: Me'ir Binyamin Menaḥem Danon; c. 1770 – 22 November 1854) was a rabbinical writer, and chief rabbi of Sarajevo in Bosnia, who lived in the first half of the nineteenth century. He wrote Be'er ba-sadeh ('A Well in the Field'; Jerusalem, 1846), a supercommentary on Rashi's commentary to the Torah, and on its supercommentator, Elijah Mizraḥi.

== Publications ==
- Be'er ba-sadeh [A Well in the Field] (in Hebrew). Jerusalem. 1846.
