= Lucas Parodi =

Argentine footballer

Personal information
- Full name: Lucas Joaquín Parodi Cuello
- Date of birth: November 30, 1990 (age 35)
- Place of birth: Villa Allende, Córdoba, Argentina
- Height: 1.85 m (6 ft 1 in)
- Position: Defensive midfielder

Team information
- Current team: Deportivo Rivera
- Number: 10

Senior career*
Years	Team	Apps	(Gls)
2011–2016	Belgrano	65	(3)
2013–2014	→ Cobresal (loan)	24	(2)
2016	→ Temperley (loan)	4	(0)
2018	Racing de Córdoba	–	(–)
2018–2019	General Paz Juniors	3	(0)
2020–2021	Juventud de Pergamino	1	(0)
2021	Alvear FBC	6	(0)
2021	Ferro General Pico	11	(0)
2022–2023	Costa Brava	6	(0)
2023	Alger FC	–	(–)
2023	Deportivo Colón	–	(–)
2024–	Deportivo Rivera	–	(–)
- * Club domestic league appearances and goals as of 12 October 2024

Lucas Joaquín Parodi Cuello (born 30 November 1990) is an Argentine football midfielder who plays for Deportivo Rivera in the Argentine Liga Regional Coronel Suárez.

== Teams ==
- (Argentina) Belgrano 2011–2012
- (Chile) Cobresal 2013–2014
- (Argentina) Belgrano 2014–2016
- (Argentina) Temperley 2016
- (Argentina) Racing de Córdoba 2018
- (Argentina) General Paz Juniors 2018–2019
- (Argentina) Juventud de Pergamino 2020–2021
- (Argentina) Alvear FBC 2021
- (Argentina) Ferro General Pico 2021
- (Argentina) Costa Brava 2022–2023
- (Argentina) Alger FC 2023
- (Argentina) Deportivo Colón 2023
- (Argentina) Deportivo Rivera 2024–Present
