= César Pereyra =

Argentine footballer

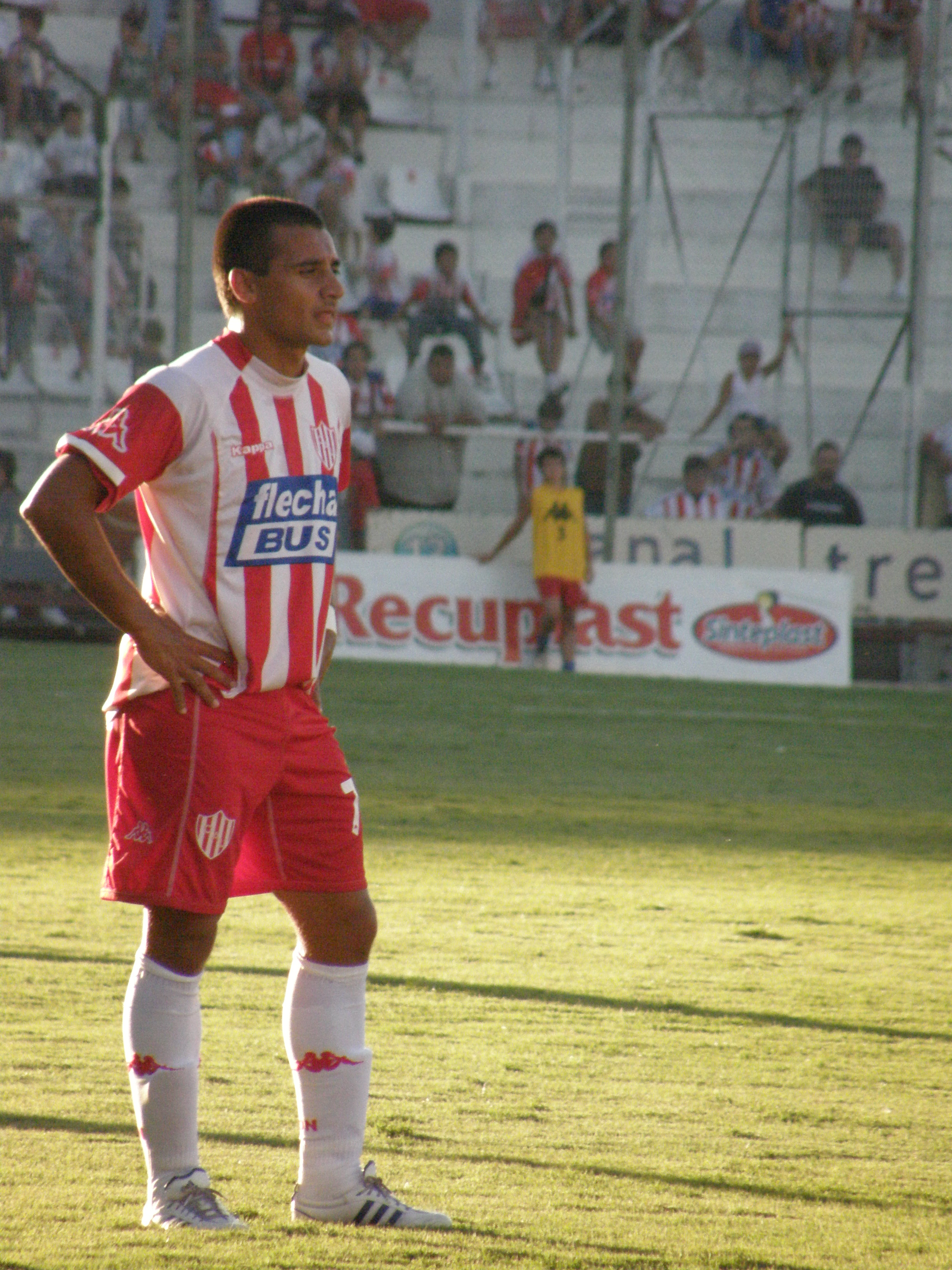
- César Pereyra

Personal information
- Full name: César Emanuel Pereyra
- Date of birth: 23 November 1981 (age 44)
- Place of birth: Villa Ocampo, Santa Fe, Argentina
- Height: 1.68 m (5 ft 6 in)
- Position: Forward

Team information
- Current team: Rocha

Youth career
- Unión

Senior career*
Years	Team	Apps	(Gls)
2002–2005	Unión	118	(32)
2005–2006	Independiente	11	(0)
2006	Atlas	12	(2)
2007–2009	Unión	37	(15)
2009–2016	Belgrano	158	(52)
2015	→ Sporting Cristal (loan)	26	(7)
2017–2018	Blooming	66	(24)
2019–2020	Deportivo Maldonado	38	(13)
2021–	Rocha	16	(2)
- * Club domestic league appearances and goals as of 20:22, 26 December 2021 (UTC)

César Emanuel Pereyra (born November 23, 1981), nicknamed "El Picante", is an Argentine footballer who currently plays for Rocha in the Uruguayan Segunda División.

== Teams ==
- Unión de Santa Fe 2002–2005
- Independiente 2005–2006
- Atlas 2006
- Unión de Santa Fe 2007–2009
- Belgrano de Córdoba 2009-
- Sporting Cristal 2015–2016
- Blooming 2017–2023
- Club Atletico Douglas Haig 2023-
