= Nicolás Cambiasso =

Argentine footballer

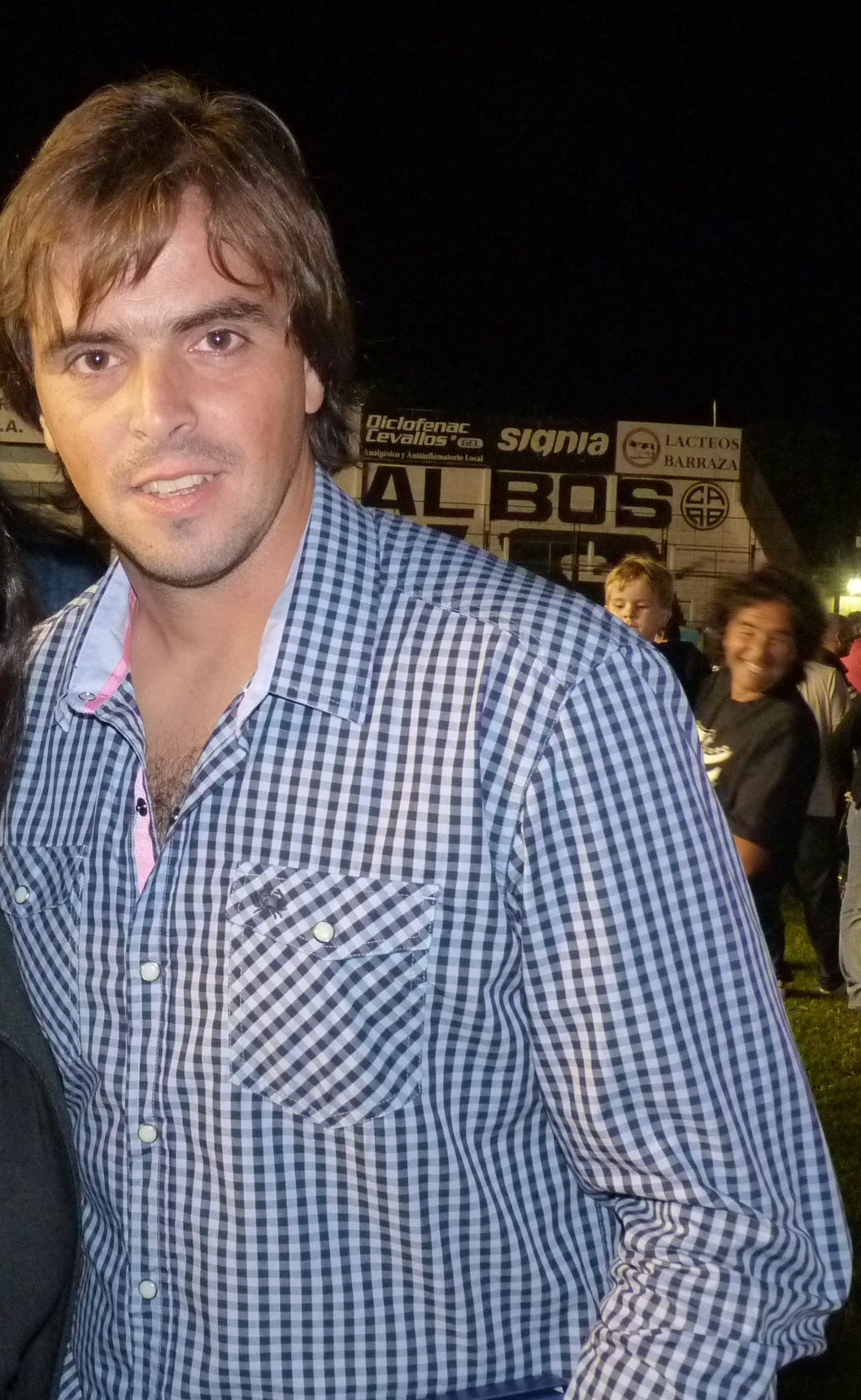
- Nicolás Cambiasso in 2012

Personal information
- Full name: Nicolás Carlos Cambiasso Deleau
- Date of birth: March 2, 1978 (age 48)
- Place of birth: Buenos Aires, Argentina
- Height: 1.83 m (6 ft 0 in)
- Position: Goalkeeper

Youth career
- Argentinos Juniors

Senior career*
Years	Team	Apps	(Gls)
1995–1999	Real Madrid B	8	(0)
1999–2002	El Porvenir	33	(0)
2002–2003	Defensores de Belgrano	13	(0)
2003–2006	Olimpo	24	(0)
2007–2014	All Boys	211	(0)
- * Club domestic league appearances and goals as of 18:56, 30 May 2012 (UTC)

Nicolás Carlos Cambiasso Deleau (born March 2, 1978) is an Argentine retired football goalkeeper who last played for All Boys in the Argentine Primera División. He is elder brother of Esteban Cambiasso.

Prior to All Boys he played in the Primera with Olimpo Bahia Blanca.

== Honours ==
Individual

- Ubaldo Fillol Award: Clausura 2012
