= Laurence Danon =

French businesswoman

Laurence Danon Arnaud
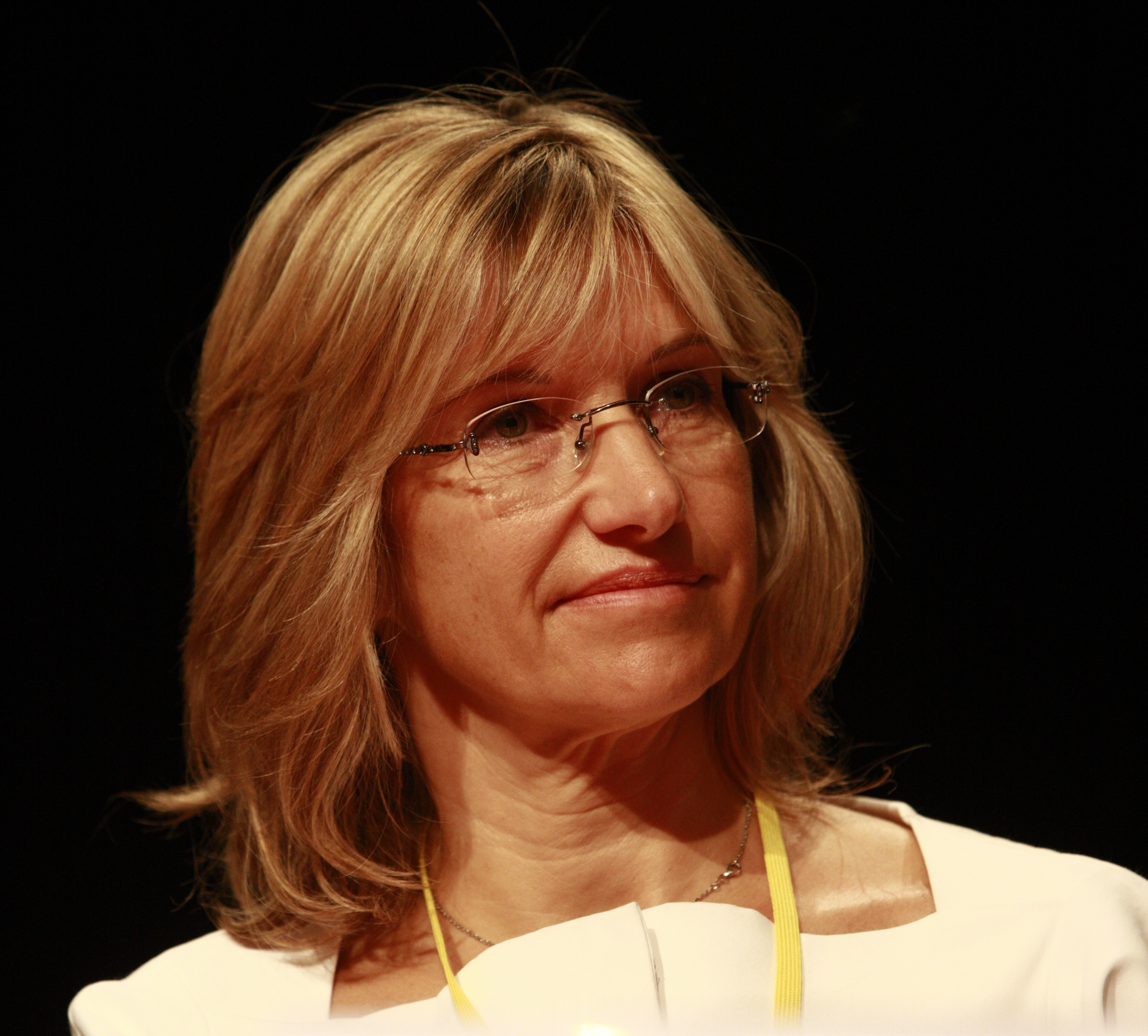
- Born: 6 January 1956 (age 70); Bordeaux, France
- Occupations: Chairman Primerose, non-executive Director of Amundi and chairman of strategic committee since 2015, non-executive Director and Chairman of Audit Committee of media group TF1 since 2010
- Children: David, Felix

Laurence Danon Arnaud (born 6 January 1956) is a French businesswoman. She is chairman of her family office Primerose SAS.

== Early life and education ==
Danon is a graduate of the École normale supérieure (Paris) (1977-1981) and graduate of France's elite Corps des Mines (1981-1984), with a postgraduate diploma in Organic Chemistry and agrégée with a senior postgraduate teaching qualification in Physics.

== Career ==
=== Career in the public sector ===
Danon began her career in 1984 at the Ministry of Industry. First head of the Industrial Development division for the Region of Picardy, she moved to the Energy and Oil Direction of the Ministry in Paris as Head of Exploration - Production.

=== Career in the private sector ===
In 1989, Danon joined the Elf Group where she was in charge of sales and marketing in the Polymer Division. Two years later, she was appointed Director at the Industrial Specialties Division, and in 1994 was nominated chief executive officer, World Functional Polymers Division. In 1996, she was appointed CEO of Ato-Findley which became Bostik after the takeover of Elf by Total in 1999, and the merger of Ato-Findley and Bostik which was led by her. With sales above 1 billion euros, Bostik became the number two in adhesives worldwide in 2000.

In 2001, Danon was nominated chairman and CEO of Printemps, the French department store chain and Member of the executive committee of PPR (Pinault Printemps Redoute - now KERING). Danon managed the group's repositioning into fashion and luxury goods. In the wake of Printemps sale in October 2006 for a record price of 1.1 Billion euros, she resigned her post in early 2007.

In 2007, Danon joined the world of Corporate Finance and became CEO of the Edmond de Rothschild Group's Corporate Finance division. In 2013, she joined Leonardo & Co. SAS, a subsidiary of the Italian bank Banca Leonardo as chairman of the board.

Following on the disposal of Leonardo & Co. SAS to Natixis in 2015, Danon joined her family office.

== Other activities ==
=== Corporate boards ===
- Groupe Bruxelles Lambert (GBL), Independent Member of the Board of Directors (since 2017)
- Gecina, Independent Member of the Board of Directors (since 2017)
- Amundi, Non-Executive Independent Member of the Board of Directors (since 2015)
- TF1, Non-Executive Independent Member of the Board of Directors (since 2010)
- Diageo, Non-Executive Independent Member of the Board of Directors (2006-2015)
- Plastic Omnium, Member of the Board of Directors (2003-2010)
- Experian, Member of the Board of Directors (2007-2010)
- Rhodia, Member of the Board of Directors (2008-2011)
- Groupe BPCE, Member of the Board of Directors (2009-2013)

=== Non-profit organizations ===
- Medef, chair of the Prospectives Commission (2005-2013)
- École des Mines de Nantes, chairman of the board (2000-2003)
- Ecole Normale Supérieure Foundation, chairman (2004–2006)

== Recognition ==
- Member of the French Academy of Technologies
- Officer of the French Legion of Honour
