= Gastón Turus =

Argentine footballer

Personal information
- Full name: Gastón Alejandro Turus
- Date of birth: 27 May 1980 (age 46)
- Place of birth: Colonia Caroya, Argentina
- Height: 1.75 m (5 ft 9 in)
- Position: Right-back

Senior career*
Years	Team	Apps	(Gls)
2000–2015	Belgrano	156	(6)
- * Club domestic league appearances and goals

Gastón Alejandro Turus (born 27 May 1980) is an Argentine former professional footballer who played as a right-back, spending all of his career with Club Atlético Belgrano of the Argentine Primera División.

== Career ==
- Belgrano de Córdoba 2000–2015
