= César Mansanelli =

Argentine footballer

Personal information
- Full name: Osvaldo César Mansanelli
- Date of birth: 29 August 1980 (age 46)
- Place of birth: Córdoba, Argentina
- Height: 1.76 m (5 ft 9 in)
- Position: Right midfielder

Youth career
- Racing de Córdoba

Senior career*
Years	Team	Apps	(Gls)
2000–2005	Racing de Córdoba		
2005–2013	Belgrano	139	(12)
2013–2014	Atlético de Rafaela	25	(0)
2014–2015	Belgrano	19	(0)
2016	Racing de Córdoba		
- * Club domestic league appearances and goals

Osvaldo César Mansanelli (born 29 August 1980) is an Argentine former footballer.
