= Cristian Tavio =

Argentine footballer

Personal information
- Full name: Cristian Sebastián Tavio
- Date of birth: September 22, 1979 (age 47)
- Place of birth: Buenos Aires, Argentina
- Height: 1.85 m (6 ft 1 in)
- Position: Left back

Team information
- Current team: Platense

Youth career
- Deportivo Paraguayo

Senior career*
Years	Team	Apps	(Gls)
1996–1999	Deportivo Paraguayo	45	(1)
2000–2001	Huracán	1	(0)
2001–2002	Estudiantes (BA)	38	(9)
2002–2003	Olimpo	26	(2)
2003	Independiente	5	(0)
2004–2005	Banfield	24	(2)
2005–2006	Colón	11	(0)
2006	Arsenal de Sarandí	3	(0)
2007–2008	Olimpo	38	(1)
2008–2009	San Martín (SJ)	25	(3)
2009–2010	Racing Club	3	(0)
2010	Atlético Tucumán	11	(0)
2011	Belgrano	17	(0)
2011–2014	Huracán	19	(1)
2014	Platense	16	(0)
- * Club domestic league appearances and goals

Cristian Sebastián Tavio (born 22 September 1979, in Buenos Aires) is an Argentine football left back who plays for Platense in the Primera B Metropolitana.

== Career ==
Tavio started his career in 1996 at Deportivo Paraguayo of the 4th division. In 1999, he earned a transfer to Huracán of the Argentine Primera División. His one-season spell with Huracán was the beginning of a sequence of one-season spells, the other clubs in the sequence were Estudiantes (BA), Olimpo, Independiente, Club Atlético Banfield, Colón, Arsenal de Sarandí, again Olimpo, San Martín de San Juan and Racing Club.

In December 2010, Tavio joined Belgrano.
