= Yaco Danón =

Turkish footballer

Personal information
- Full name: Jacobo Danón
- Place of birth: İzmir, Turkey
- Position: Striker

Senior career*
Years	Team	Apps	(Gls)
1948–1949	Chacarita Juniors	6	(2)
1949–1957	All Boys	237	(125)
1958	Chacarita Juniors	10	(6)
- * Club domestic league appearances and goals

Jacobo Danón was a Turkish footballer who most of his career played as a striker for Argentine side All Boys.

== Life ==
Danón was born in İzmir, Turkey, and moved to Argentina at a young age. He was nicknamed "the Turk".

== Career ==
In 1949, Danón signed for Argentine side All Boys, where he was regarded as one of the club's most important players.

== Style of play ==
Danón mainly operated as a striker and was described as "very skilled... not a nine from the area like now, but rather he came to look for the ball behind."
