= Pepe Romero (footballer) =

Argentine footballer and manager

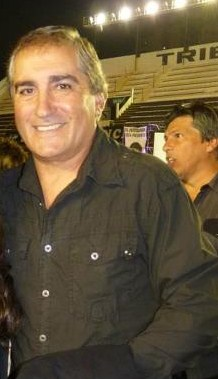
- Romero celebrating the centennial of All Boys (2013)

Personal information
- Full name: José Santos Romero
- Date of birth: 3 November 1951 (age 74)
- Place of birth: Buenos Aires, Argentina
- Height: 1.74 m (5 ft 8 1/2 in)
- Position: Midfielder

Team information
- Current team: All Boys

Youth career
- 1964–1967: All Boys

Senior career*
Years	Team	Apps	(Gls)
1967–1976	All Boys	125	(34)
1976–1981	Temperley	?	(?)
1981	All Boys	6	(0)

Managerial career
- 1986: All Boys (interim)
- 1988–1989: All Boys (interim)
- 1992–1993: Estudiantes (Bs. As.)
- 2004–2005: All Boys
- 2007–2013: All Boys
- 2014: Ferro
- 2015–2017: All Boys
- * Club domestic league appearances and goals

José Santos "Pepe" Romero (born 3 November 1951, in Buenos Aires) is an Argentine football manager and former midfielder.

== Playing career ==
=== Club career ===
Romero started his career at All Boys in the Primera B in 1967 when he was 16 years old. In 1972, they won 11 consecutive games (which remains a record for lower categories), obtaining 29/30 points. Therefore, on 14 October 1972, All Boys became Primera B champion defeating Excursionistas 1–0. He played the Primera División tournament with All Boys until 1976. In 1976, he moved to Temperley. In 1981, Romero returned to All Boys where he retired as a player.

=== Managerial career ===
Romero embarked on his managerial career in 1981 at the lower divisions in All Boys. He had a stint as coach of Estudiantes de Buenos Aires.

In 2004, he took over as coach of All Boys with Jose Paladino. In that year, he left the institution by problems with some players and returned to it in 2007 when the team was still in Primera B Metropolitana.

On 2 April 2007, following the resignation of Nestor Ferraresi coaching for poor performance and bad football moment, Roberto Bugallo bet on Pepe Romero.

With the arrival of Aníbal Biggeri as Assistant Coach for the 2007/08 season, he manages to put together a strong team in defense and strong in attack. So much so that in the final three dates, he gets his first title as coach, defeating Atlanta 2–0.

In the 2009/10 season, his team finished fourth in the last date, defeating 2-0 Independiente Rivadavia. That way, he qualified to play for promotion to the first division, where he had to face Rosario Central. The first match, played at the Estadio Islas Malvinas, finished tied 1-1. Although everything seemed to be lost and would dispute the return visitor, Pepe Romero got his team give great blow that evening in Rosario, when All Boys defeated 3–0 at the Estadio Gigante de Arroyito, achieving promotion to the Primera División after 30 years of absence in that category.

== Honours ==
=== Club ===
All Boys

- Primera B: 1972

=== Managerial ===
All Boys

- Primera B Metropolitana: 2007/08
- Primera B Nacional: Promotion to the Primera División 2009/10
