= All Boys =

- Full name: Club Atlético All Boys
- Nickname: Albo
- Founded: 15 March 1913; 113 years ago
- Ground: Estadio Islas Malvinas, Floresta, Buenos Aires, Argentina
- Capacity: 21,500
- Chairman: Nicolás Cambiasso
- Coach: Aníbal Biggeri
- League: Primera Nacional
- 2025: Primera Nacional Zone A, 10th of 18
- Website: caallboys.com.ar
| Home colours | Away colours | Third colours |

Club Atlético All Boys (Spanish pronunciation: [ˈkluβ aˈtletiko ˈol ˈβojs]) is an Argentine sports club based in Floresta, Buenos Aires. The institution is mostly known for its football team, which currently plays in the Primera B Nacional, the second division of the Argentine football league system.

Other sports and activities practiced at the club are basketball, chess, futsal, handball, kick boxing, roller skating, taekwondo, freestyle wrestling, jiu-jitsu and sipalki.

== History ==
On 15 March 1913, the club was founded by a group of friends. The name "All Boys" reflected the youthfulness of its founders, and followed the Argentine tradition of naming football clubs in English, such as Newell's Old Boys, Boca Juniors, River Plate and Racing Club had done before.

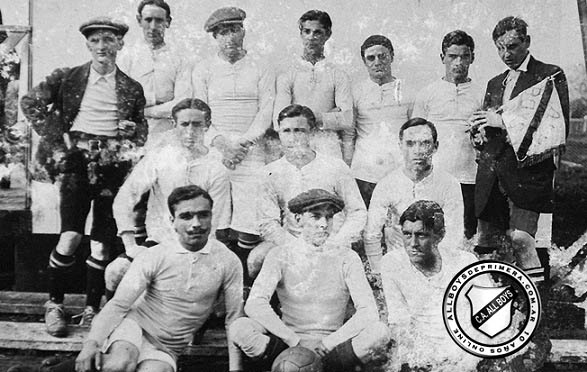
All Boys team of 1914, the year the club started to play officially

In 1914 All Boys registered to Argentine Football Association and began to play at "División Intermedia" (current Second Division), where they earned qualification to play the Copa Competencia. The team promoted to Primera División in 1922, making its debut in the top division on 11 March 1923 with a 1–0 loss against Temperley. The first official goal in Primera was scored in a 1–1 draw against Porteño. The "Albo" won its first game in Primera in the 3rd fixture, with a 3–1 victory against Progresista.

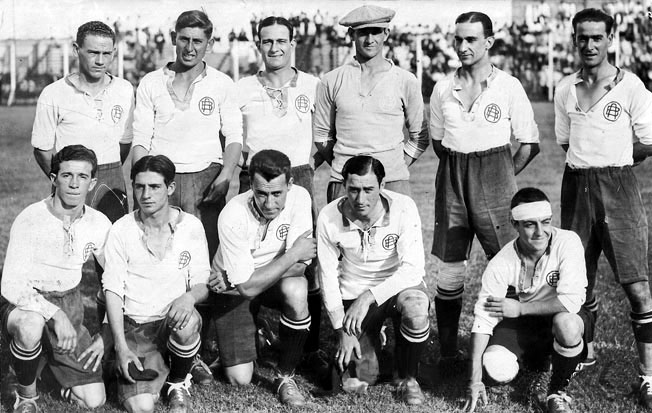
In 1931 All Boys returned to Primera División

All Boys disaffiliated from the Association in 1926 but the team returned to Segunda División one year later when both associations merged into one. In 1931, All Boys was promoted a second time, remaining in Primera until 1934 when the Amateur Association joined Professional league and all its teams were relegated.

In 1945 the team went down to the second division for the first time, but in the following year All Boys won the Tercera de Ascenso championship after defeating Justo José de Urquiza 2–1. That season All Boys played 24 matches and scored 91 goals.

In 1950 there was a restructuring in Argentine football that sent many teams to the lower division, alleging that those institutions had their stadiums in poor conditions to host the Primera División matches. One of those teams relegated was All Boys. The following year All Boys won its second championship with a victory over Tiro Federal which brought the "Albo" back to Primera.

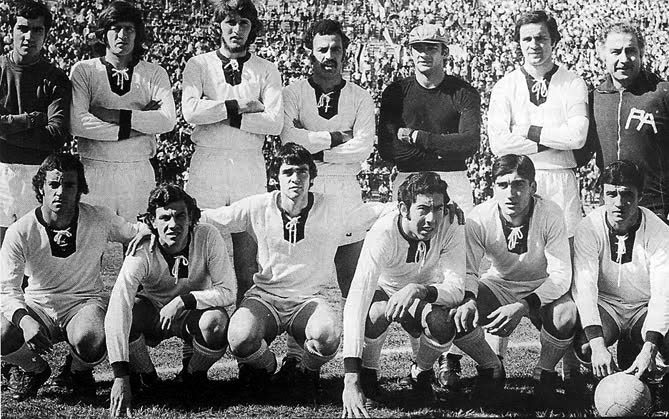
All Boys team of 1972, that won the second division championship and got promotion to Primera

In 1972 All Boys hired José Paladino as coach. Under his command, the squad won 11 consecutive games (which remains a record for lower categories), obtaining 29/30 points. Therefore, on 14 October 1972, All Boys became Primera B champion by defeating Excursionistas 1–0 with a goal scored by Benítez.

Some notable players of that team were Valentín Sánchez (top scorer), José Romero (proclaimed as "the best player of the team") and Ángel Mamberto. After promotion to the Primera, All Boys remained eight years in that division, until 1980 when the club was relegated to Primera B.

In the 1982 season, the club was almost relegated to the third division, the Primera C Metropolitana (fourth div. today), after finishing last in the league table, but won the relegation playoff on penalties against Talleres (RE). When the Argentine football system was restructured in 1986 with the addition of the Primera B Nacional, which would become the new second division, All Boys could not qualify amongst the top 8 teams to play the new second division, and as a result was relegated to the Primera B Metropolitana, which became the third division.

In the 1989–90 season, All Boys was very close to achieving promotion back into the second division, but lost the playoff final against Deportivo Laferrere.

For the 1992–93 season Mario Rizzi was hired as the team coach, and he incorporated some players such as Marcelo Blanco, Marcelo Yanino, and Rubén Urquiza. With the help of these transfers, the team made a great campaign and earned promotion to Primera B Nacional. The decisive match was a 2–1 away victory against Defensores de Belgrano, where 25,000 All Boys' supporters attended, which set a new spectator record for the lower categories in Argentine football. This victory gave the club the league title, which also directly promoted it into Primera B Nacional without having to go through the play-offs.

At the end of the 2000–01 season the team was relegated to Primera B Metropolitana again. For the 2002–03 season the club hired Ricardo Caruso Lombardi as coach. The team won 8 consecutive games and qualified to play the Torneo Reducido, which was won by the club, but then lost promotion at the hands of El Porvenir due to a sporting advantage, after having drawn on aggregate. For the 2007–08 season the club incorporated Ariel Zárate, Hernán Grana and Gustavo Bartelt, among other players from different clubs. Former player José Romero was designated as coach. On 6 May 2008, All Boys won another league championship after the 2–0 victory vs Atlanta, which returned "El Albo" to Primera B Nacional.

All Boys Anthem
Composed by Guillermo Meres and Carlos Acuña.

At the end of the 2009–10 Primera B Nacional season, All Boys finished 4th and qualified to play the promotion playoff in order to gain a place in Primera División. After a 1–1 tie in Floresta, All Boys surprised everyone by beating Rosario Central 3–0 in the second leg played at Estadio Gigante de Arroyito. With this victory, the club returned to the top division of Argentine football after a 30 year absence. In the 2010 Apertura, All Boys had a decent season and finished 8th in the league table, while achieving victories over "big clubs" like Independiente, Estudiantes de La Plata, River Plate, amongst others.

All Boys had their best first division campaign in the 2012 Clausura, when it finished third in the league table, 5 points behind champion Arsenal de Sarandí. The club had the best defensive record as well, only conceding 13 goals. Notable victories included beating Independiente 3–0 at Estadio Libertadores de América and Boca Juniors 3–1 at home with a hat-trick from Emmanuel Perea.

In May 2014 the club was relegated to the Primera B Nacional. In 2018, it was relegated to Primera B Metropolitana, the third division. It gained promotion back into the B Nacional a year later.

== Rivalries ==
All Boys' most well-known rivalry is with Nueva Chicago, called the "Superclasico del Ascenso". This rivalry is considered by many to be one of the most attractive outside of the First Division rivalries. It was born in 1919 when these two teams played their first match, which ended in a victory for Nueva Chicago. All Boys won the first match against their rival in 1924, with a 2–1 victory. The next game had to wait until 1941, because the Torito (Nueva Chicago's nickname) had fallen to Primera C in 1937 and returned only after three years. "Albo" won that match 3–1 in Nueva Chicago's home, Mataderos. From that time forward All Boys maintains the advantage in wins over Nueva Chicago, an advantage they have never lost. This rivalry has seen more than 90 official matches.

All Boys' original rival is Argentinos Juniors, due to the proximity of their respective neighborhoods. However, since most of the time the two clubs have played in different categories, the rivalry isn't as intense as with Nueva Chicago. These two institutions have clashed officially on more than 60 occasions.

All Boys also has a fierce rivalry with Atlanta. Both neighborhoods are relatively close to each other and matches between the two clubs have occurred frequently, as both would find themselves in the same league for many years. The first official match between the two took place in 1914, with All Boys winning 2–1. It is commonly said that the rivalry was also born because of Atlanta's neighborhood, Villa Crespo, having a substantial Jewish population (many Atlanta fans belong to this collectivity, even to this day); while Floresta, in turn, had more people of Arab ethnicity, and even though the latter doesn't seem to be true nowadays, All Boys fans do display flags with a crescent moon and star.

A relatively new rivalry is that with Vélez Sarsfield. While both clubs are relatively close in distance to each other, they have rarely faced each other, as Vélez has played mostly in Primera División while All Boys have played in lower tiers for most of their history, making it a distant and minor rivalry for many years. It wasn't until All Boys won promotion to the Primera División in 2010 that the rivalry was finally ignited, and in subsequent years violence between fans of the two clubs has been a common occurrence at matches.

== Crests ==
The first crest was used from 1913 to 1919 and had "AB" overlapping each other inside a circle. The second crest was used numerous times: first from 1922 to 1930, then from 1937 to 1947, 1958–60, and for the last time in 1973. In this crest, the letters were made larger to fit a circular margin, and were placed side-by-side instead of overlapping.

The club's third crest had four letters in it, "C.A.A.B", referencing to its new Spanish prefix, "Club Atletico" instead of suffix "Athletic Club". It was used from 1944 to 1960, and again from 1982 to 1989, and for a last time from 1994 to 2002.

In 1967, the club began to use the crest it has today. The club used this crest for that year and didn't reuse it until 1989. It was used for the second time from 1989 to 1994, and then from 2002 until today.

== Stadium ==
The construction of the first stadium of the club began when Leopoldo Rigoli gave the property located between Gaona, Segurola, Morón, and Sanabria streets to All Boys. The club built a roofed podium and five rooms for the players. In 1924 they settled in at Segurola Avenue and opened its new stadium to play a friendly match against Temperley.

In 1937, when professionalism started, All Boys had their new stadium in the city block formed by the streets, Segurola, Indio (current Elpidio Gonzalez), Sanabria and Miranda, where they played until 1959.

In 1959, the national government donated the land, located on Av. Alvarez Jonte between the streets Chivilcoy and Mercedes, to the club. Construction on the new stadium began that year, and on 28 September 1963 the stadium was officially inaugurated, in a match against Deportivo Riestra, which All Boys won convincingly.

Originally the stadium had only two stands on the side, but now there are stands on all sides. The stadium has a capacity of 21,500.

== Current squad ==
Note: Flags indicate national team as defined under FIFA eligibility rules; some limited exceptions apply. Players may hold more than one non-FIFA nationality.

| No. | Pos. | Nation | Player |
|---|---|---|---|
| — | GK | ARG | Tiago Libares |
| — | GK | ARG | Lukas Ramil Sauer |
| — | GK | ARG | Roberto Ramírezo |
| — | DF | ARG | Tobías Bovone |
| — | DF | ARG | Maximiliano Coronel |
| — | DF | ARG | Yago De Vito (C)(L.L) |
| — | DF | ARG | Juan Salas |
| — | DF | ARG | Hernán Grana |
| — | DF | ARG | Alejo Rodríguez |
| — | DF | ARG | Facundo Butti |
| — | DF | ARG | Julián Veinticinco |
| — | MF | ARG | Tomás Assennato |
| — | MF | ARG | Santiago Cáceres |
| — | MF | ARG | Thiago Calone |
| — | MF | ARG | Julián Ceballos |

| No. | Pos. | Nation | Player |
|---|---|---|---|
| — | MF | ARG | Leandro Desábato |
| — | MF | ARG | Nicolás Díaz García |
| — | MF | ARG | Alexis Vega |
| — | MF | ARG | Gustavo Turraca |
| — | MF | ARG | Tomás Assennato |
| — | MF | ARG | Axel Abet |
| — | MF | ARG | Juan Pablo Passaglia |
| — | MF | ARG | Lionel Jara |
| — | FW | ARG | Claudio Campostrini |
| — | FW | ARG | Agustín Gallo |
| — | FW | ARG | Benjamín González |
| — | FW | ARG | Matías Nouet |
| — | FW | ARG | Ricardo Ramírez |
| — | FW | ARG | Ignacio Palacio |

== Notable former players ==
- (German Empire) (Argentina) Marius Hiller
- (Argentina) Yaco Danón
- (Argentina) Martín Romagnoli (1994–98)
- (Argentina) Sergio Batista (1997–99)
- (Argentina) Nicolás Cambiasso (2007–14)
- (Argentina) Ariel Zárate (2007–11)
- (Argentina) Ariel Ortega (2011)
- (Argentina) Jorge Bianco (1976)
- (Argentina) Gabriel Cella Ruggeri (1999-2000)
- (Colombia) Santiago Montoya Muñoz (2012–13)
- (Argentina) Oscar Ahumada (2012–14)
- (Argentina) Carlos Tevez (Youth career, 1992–96)
- (Argentina) Néstor Fabbri (1984–85), (2004–05)
- (Argentina) Jonathan Calleri (2012–14)

== Former managers ==
- (Argentina) José Manuel Moreno
- (Argentina) Adolfo Pedernera
- (Argentina) José Ramos Delgado
- (Argentina) Silvio Marzolini (1975–76)
- (Uruguay) Ricardo Pavoni (1982)
- (Argentina) José Santos Romero (interim) (1986)
- (Argentina) Juan Carlos Cárdenas (1986)
- (Argentina) José Santos Romero (interim) (1988–89)
- (Argentina) Francisco Sá (1991)
- (Argentina) Mario Rizzi (1 July 1992 – 30 June 1993)
- (Argentina) Ricardo Rodríguez (1 July 1997 – 30 June 1998)
- (Argentina) Sergio Batista (1 Jan 1999 – 30 June 1999)
- (Argentina) Alberto Pascutti (1 Jan 2001 – 30 June 2001)
- (Argentina) Ricardo Caruso Lombardi (1 July 2002 – 30 June 2003)
- (Argentina) Ricardo Zielinski (2004)
- (Argentina) José Santos Romero (1 Jan 2005 – 30 June 2005)
- (Argentina) Néstor Ferraresi (1 July 2006 – 1 April 2007)
- (Argentina) José Santos Romero (2 April 2007 – 23 June 2013)
- (Argentina) Julio César Falcioni (24 June 2013 – 16 November 2013)
- (Argentina) Ricardo Rodríguez (19 Nov 2013 – 14 June 2014)
- (Argentina) Ángel Bernuncio (2014)
- (Argentina) Gabriel Perrone (2015)
- (Argentina) José Santos Romero (26 May 2015 – present)

== Statistics in Primera División ==
| Season | Final Pos. | Teams | Format |
|---|---|---|---|
| 1923 AAF | 10 | 23 | League |
| 1924 AAF | 4 | 22 | League |
| 1925 AAF | 16 | 23 | League |
| 1926 AAF | – | 18 | League (Note: All matches played by the team were annulled. All Boys was relegated to the second division.) |
| 1932 | 5 | 17 | League (Note: Remaining amateur league after the football became professional in Argentina. This league lasted until 1934 when it merged with professional league and all its teams were relegated.) |
| 1933 | 7 | 20 | League |
| 1934 | 16 | 23 | League |
| 1973 Met | 16 | 17 | League |
| 1973 Nac | 14 | 15 | Group |
| 1974 Met | 5 | 9 | Group |

| Season | Final Pos. | Teams | Format |
|---|---|---|---|
| 1974 Nac | 8 | 9 | Group |
| 1975 Met | 18 | 20 | League |
| 1975 Nac | 5 | 8 | Group |
| 1976 Met | 11 | 11 | Group |
| 1976 Nac | 9 | 9 | Group |
| 1977 Met | 19 | 23 | League |
| 1977 Nac | 8 | 8 | Group |
| 1978 Met | 17 | 21 | League |
| 1978 Nac | 7 | 8 | Group |
| 1979 Met | 8 | 10 | Group |

| Season | Final Pos. | Teams | Format |
|---|---|---|---|
| 1979 Nac | 5 | 7 | Group |
| 1980 Met | 18 | 19 | League (Note: Relegated at the end of the season.) |
| 2010 Ap | 8 | 20 | League |
| 2011 Cl | 12 | 20 | League |
| 2011 Ap | 16 | 20 | League |
| 2012 Cl | 5 | 20 | League |
| 2012 I | 12 | 20 | League |
| 2013 F | 16 | 20 | League |
| 2013 I | 16 | 22 | League |
| 2014 F | 20 | 15 | League |

== Titles ==
=== National ===
- Primera B Metropolitana (3): 1972, 1992–93, 2007–08
- Primera C (2): 1946, 1950
