= 2019–20 Club y Biblioteca Ramón Santamarina season =

Association football season

Santamarina
2019–20 season
- President: Pablo Bossio
- Manager: Fernando Quiroz
- Stadium: Estadio Municipal General San Martín
- Top goalscorer: League: Fernando Telechea; Valentín Depietri; Martín Michel; All: Fernando Telechea; Valentín Depietri; Martín Michel

The 2019–20 season is Santamarina's 7th consecutive season in the second division of Argentine football, Primera B Nacional.

The season generally covers the period from 1 July 2019 to 30 June 2020.

== Review ==
=== Pre-season ===
Leonel Pierce's departure was revealed on 11 June 2019, as the defensive midfielder moved to Romania with Botoșani. 18 June saw Deportivo Morón sign Francisco Oliver, six days prior to Patricio Boolsen arriving from Racing Club to become Santamarina's first reinforcement. Román Strada followed him in on 30 June from Mitre. Three transactions were announced on 1 July, with Lucas Kruspzky (Aldosivi) and Fernando Piñero (Central Córdoba) signing while Leonardo Morales headed to Gimnasia y Esgrima (LP). Agustín Guiffrey was loaned from Patronato on 4 July, a day before Lautaro Arregui penned terms from Racing Club. Gustavo Iturra (Racing Club) and Joaquín Papaleo (Unión Santa Fe) loans were communicated on 7 July, as the latter joined for a third stint.

In the week leading up to their first exhibition, Adrián Scifo and Marcelo Guzmán joined the club while Agustín Politano left. Santamarina's first pre-season opponents were Círculo Deportivo, who they fought and beat by two goals in Comandante Nicanor Otamendi on 17 July. On 24 July, Santamarina met Almirante Brown in friendlies. Luca Orozco came from Olimpo on 25 July. Federico Paulucci was signed by Ferro Carril Oeste (GP) on 26 July. Alvarado visited Santamarina twice on 27 July, as they left the Estadio Municipal General San Martín undefeated. Guido Rancez, on 7 August, became a new player of Torneo Federal A's Chaco For Ever. Santamarina had a second match with Círculo Deportivo on 9 August, as a scoreless draw concluded their pre-season.

A fourth loan incoming, Jonás Acevedo from San Lorenzo, was confirmed on 14 August.

=== August ===
Santamarina opened their Primera B Nacional season with no goals as they drew away to Sarmiento on 17 August. They suffered defeat on matchday two, as Deportivo Riestra took all the points after a goal from Esteban Pipino. Santamarina secured their first competitive victory of the campaign on 31 August, defeating Chacarita Juniors 0–3.

== Squad ==
Squad No.	Nationality	Name	Position(s)	Date of birth (age)	Signed from
Goalkeepers
	Argentina	Tomás Casas	GK	27 September 1996 (age 30)	Academy
	Argentina	Juan Pablo Mazza	GK	28 February 1997 (age 29)	Academy
	Argentina	Joaquín Papaleo	GK	23 March 1994 (age 32)	Unión Santa Fe (loan)
Defenders
	Argentina	Lautaro Arregui	DF	13 March 1998 (age 28)	Racing Club
	Argentina	Osvaldo Barsottini	CB	25 August 1981 (age 45)	Ferro Carril Oeste
	Argentina	Patricio Boolsen	DF	28 January 1998 (age 28)	Racing Club
	Argentina	Lucas Kruspzky	LB	6 April 1992 (age 34)	Aldosivi
	Argentina	Agustín Mazzola	DF	16 July 1998 (age 28)	Academy
	Argentina	Luca Orozco	DF	15 April 1995 (age 31)	Olimpo
	Argentina	Fernando Piñero	CB	16 February 1993 (age 33)	Central Córdoba
	Argentina	Lucas Sánchez	DF	12 December 1997 (age 28)	Academy
	Argentina	Adrián Scifo	RB	10 October 1987 (age 39)	Nueva Chicago
Midfielders
	Argentina	Jonás Acevedo	AM	6 February 1997 (age 29)	San Lorenzo (loan)
	Argentina	Valentín Depietri	AM	31 October 2000 (age 26)	Academy
	Argentina	Mariano González	RM	5 May 1981 (age 45)	Colón
	Argentina	Agustín Guiffrey	LW	3 November 1997 (age 29)	Patronato (loan)
	Argentina	Matías Gutiérrez	MF	4 March 1994 (age 32)	Ferrocarril Sud de Tandil
	Argentina	Marcelo Guzmán	CM	16 February 1985 (age 41)	Atlético de Rafaela
	Argentina	Gustavo Iturra	MF	6 April 1999 (age 27)	Racing Club (loan)
	Argentina	Matías Kabalin	MF	26 October 1998 (age 28)	Academy
	Argentina	Facundo Leiva	MF	10 September 2000 (age 26)	Academy
	Argentina	Mateo Maná	MF	26 April 1999 (age 27)	Academy
	Argentina	Román Strada	MF	16 August 1987 (age 39)	Mitre
	Argentina	Nicolás Valerio	MF	18 August 1992 (age 34)	Academy
Forwards
	Argentina	Marcos Alzueta	FW	16 August 1996 (age 30)	Academy
	Argentina	Enzo Lamarche	FW	18 September 1997 (age 29)	Academy
	Argentina	Martín Michel	FW	4 October 1983 (age 43)	Gimnasia y Esgrima (J)
	Argentina	Maximiliano Osurak	FW	23 October 1991 (age 35)	Atlético Paraná
	Argentina	Fernando Telechea	CF	6 October 1981 (age 45)	Aldosivi

== Transfers ==
Domestic transfer windows:
3 July 2019 to 24 September 2019
20 January 2020 to 19 February 2020.

=== Transfers in ===
Date from	Position	Nationality	Name	From	Ref.
3 July 2019 (Note: Deal agreed on 24 June 2019)	DF	Argentina	Patricio Boolsen	Racing Club	
3 July 2019 (Note: Deal agreed on 30 June 2019)	MF	Argentina	Román Strada	Mitre	
3 July 2019 (Note: Deal agreed on 1 July 2019)	LB	Argentina	Lucas Kruspzky	Aldosivi	
3 July 2019 (Note: Deal agreed on 1 July 2019)	CB	Argentina	Fernando Piñero	Central Córdoba	
5 July 2019	DF	Argentina	Lautaro Arregui	Racing Club	
11 July 2019	RB	Argentina	Adrián Scifo	Nueva Chicago	
16 July 2019	CM	Argentina	Marcelo Guzmán	Atlético de Rafaela	
25 July 2019	DF	Argentina	Luca Orozco	Olimpo	

=== Transfers out ===
Date from	Position	Nationality	Name	To	Ref.
11 June 2019	DM	Argentina	Leonel Pierce	Botoșani	
3 July 2019 (Note: Deal agreed on 18 June 2019)	CB	Argentina	Francisco Oliver	Deportivo Morón	
3 July 2019 (Note: Deal agreed on 1 July 2019)	RB	Argentina	Leonardo Morales	Gimnasia y Esgrima (LP)	
14 July 2019	RB	Argentina	Agustín Politano	Güemes	
26 July 2019	CB	Argentina	Federico Paulucci	Ferro Carril Oeste (GP)	
7 August 2019	MF	Argentina	Guido Rancez	Chaco For Ever	

=== Loans in ===
Start date	Position	Nationality	Name	From	End date	Ref.
4 July 2019	LW	Argentina	Agustín Guiffrey	Patronato	30 June 2020	
7 July 2019	MF	Argentina	Gustavo Iturra	Racing Club	30 June 2020	
7 July 2019	GK	Argentina	Joaquín Papaleo	Unión Santa Fe	30 June 2020	
14 August 2019	AM	Argentina	Jonás Acevedo	San Lorenzo	30 June 2020	

== Friendlies ==
=== Pre-season ===
Santamarina opened their pre-season campaign against Círculo Deportivo on 17 July, before facing Almirante Brown on 24 July and Alvarado on 27 July. Another encounter with Círculo Deportivo closed their preparation period on 9 August.

Win Draw Loss

17 July 2019 Friendly	Círculo Deportivo	0–2	Santamarina	Comandante Nicanor Otamendi, Argentina
		La Voz de Tandil	M. González; R. Strada

24 July 2019 Friendly	Almirante Brown	1–0	Santamarina	Buenos Aires, Argentina
	J. Velázquez	El Eco		Stadium: La Candela

24 July 2019 Friendly	Almirante Brown	1–1	Santamarina	Buenos Aires, Argentina
	N. Luján	El Eco	J. Didío	Stadium: La Candela

27 July 2019 Friendly	Santamarina	0–0	Alvarado	Tandil, Argentina
		La Capital MdP; 70 min. match		Stadium: Estadio Municipal General San Martín

27 July 2019 Friendly	Santamarina	2–4	Alvarado	Tandil, Argentina
	Goal	La Capital MdP; 70 min. match	G. Lucero; R. Giacomini (pen.); G. Gentile	Stadium: Estadio Municipal General San Martín

9 August 2019 Friendly	Santamarina	0–0	Círculo Deportivo	Tandil, Argentina
19:00 GMT-3		Grupo La Provincia		Stadium: Estadio Municipal General San Martín

== Competitions ==
=== Primera B Nacional ===
==== Results summary ====
Overall								Home						Away					
Pld	W	D	L	GF	GA	GD	Pts	W	D	L	GF	GA	GD	W	D	L	GF	GA	GD
3	1	1	1	3	1	+2	4	0	0	1	0	1	−1	1	1	0	3	0	+3

Last updated: 3 September 2019.
Source: Soccerway

==== Matches ====
The fixtures for the 2019–20 league season were announced on 1 August 2019, with a new format of split zones being introduced. Santamarina were drawn in Zone B.

Win Draw Loss

17 August 2019 1	Sarmiento	0–0	Santamarina	Junín, Argentina
15:30 GMT-3		Diario Democracia; Soccerway		Stadium: Estadio Eva Perón; Referee: Carlos Gareano (Argentina)

26 August 2019 2	Santamarina	0–1	Deportivo Riestra	Tandil, Argentina
20:30 GMT-3		El Eco; Soccerway	E. Pipino 74'	Stadium: Estadio Municipal General San Martín; Referee: Mario Ejarque (Argentina)

31 August 2019 3	Chacarita Juniors	0–3	Santamarina	Buenos Aires, Argentina
11:35 GMT-3		El Eco; Soccerway	F. Telechea 37'; V. Depietri 54'; M. Michel 73'	Stadium: Estadio Chacarita Juniors; Referee: Lucas Comesaña (Argentina)

9 September 2019 4	Santamarina	–	Brown	Tandil, Argentina
20:30 GMT-3				Stadium: Estadio Municipal General San Martín

== Squad statistics ==
=== Appearances and goals ===
No.	Pos.	Nationality	Name	League		Cup		League Cup		Continental		Other		Total		Discipline		Ref
No.	Pos.	Nationality	Name	Apps	Goals	Apps	Goals	Apps	Goals	Apps	Goals	Apps	Goals	Apps	Goals	Yellow card	Red card	Ref
–	GK	Argentina	Tomás Casas	0	0	—		—		—		0	0	0	0	0	0	
–	GK	Argentina	Juan Pablo Mazza	0	0	—		—		—		0	0	0	0	0	0	
–	GK	Argentina	Joaquín Papaleo	3	0	—		—		—		0	0	3	0	0	0	
–	DF	Argentina	Lautaro Arregui	0	0	—		—		—		0	0	0	0	0	0	
–	CB	Argentina	Osvaldo Barsottini	3	0	—		—		—		0	0	3	0	0	0	
–	DF	Argentina	Patricio Boolsen	0	0	—		—		—		0	0	0	0	0	0	
–	LB	Argentina	Lucas Kruspzky	3	0	—		—		—		0	0	3	0	2	0	
–	DF	Argentina	Agustín Mazzola	0	0	—		—		—		0	0	0	0	0	0	
–	DF	Argentina	Luca Orozco	0	0	—		—		—		0	0	0	0	0	0	
–	CB	Argentina	Fernando Piñero	3	0	—		—		—		0	0	3	0	0	0	
–	DF	Argentina	Lucas Sánchez	0	0	—		—		—		0	0	0	0	0	0	
–	RB	Argentina	Adrián Scifo	3	0	—		—		—		0	0	3	0	0	0	
–	AM	Argentina	Jonás Acevedo	2	0	—		—		—		0	0	2	0	0	0	
–	AM	Argentina	Valentín Depietri	1(2)	1	—		—		—		0	0	1(2)	1	0	0	
–	RM	Argentina	Mariano González	2	0	—		—		—		0	0	2	0	0	0	
–	LW	Argentina	Agustín Guiffrey	0(2)	0	—		—		—		0	0	0(2)	0	0	0	
–	MF	Argentina	Matías Gutiérrez	0	0	—		—		—		0	0	0	0	0	0	
–	CM	Argentina	Marcelo Guzmán	0(3)	0	—		—		—		0	0	0(3)	0	0	0	
–	MF	Argentina	Gustavo Iturra	2	0	—		—		—		0	0	2	0	1	0	
–	MF	Argentina	Matías Kabalin	3	0	—		—		—		0	0	3	0	1	0	
–	MF	Argentina	Facundo Leiva	0	0	—		—		—		0	0	0	0	0	0	
–	MF	Argentina	Mateo Maná	0	0	—		—		—		0	0	0	0	0	0	
–	MF	Argentina	Román Strada	2(1)	0	—		—		—		0	0	2(1)	0	1	0	
–	MF	Argentina	Nicolás Valerio	0	0	—		—		—		0	0	0	0	0	0	
–	FW	Argentina	Marcos Alzueta	0	0	—		—		—		0	0	0	0	0	0	
–	FW	Argentina	Enzo Lamarche	0	0	—		—		—		0	0	0	0	0	0	
–	FW	Argentina	Martín Michel	3	1	—		—		—		0	0	3	1	1	0	
–	FW	Argentina	Maximiliano Osurak	0	0	—		—		—		0	0	0	0	0	0	
–	CF	Argentina	Fernando Telechea	3	1	—		—		—		0	0	3	1	1	0	
Own goals				—	0	—		—		—		—	0	—	0	—	—	—

Statistics accurate as of 3 September 2019.

=== Goalscorers ===
Rank	Pos	No.	Nat	Name	League	Cup	League Cup	Continental	Other	Total	Ref
1	CF	–	Argentina	Fernando Telechea	1	—	—	—	0	1	
1	AM	–	Argentina	Valentín Depietri	1	—	—	—	0	1	
1	FW	–	Argentina	Martín Michel	1	—	—	—	0	1	
Own goals					0	—	—	—	0	0	
Totals					3	—	—	—	0	3	—
