= Marcos Alzueta =

Argentine professional footballer

Personal information
- Full name: Marcos Alzueta
- Date of birth: 16 August 1996 (age 30)
- Place of birth: Tandil, Argentina
- Height: 1.77 m (5 ft 9 1/2 in)
- Position: Forward

Youth career
- Santamarina

Senior career*
Years	Team	Apps	(Gls)
2014–2019	Santamarina	13	(0)
- * Club domestic league appearances and goals as of 16:58, 27 December 2018 (UTC)

Marcos Alzueta (born 16 August 1996) is an Argentine professional footballer who plays as a forward.

== Career ==
Alzueta started his career with Santamarina. He was selected for his debut by manager Duilio Botella, who substituted the forward on for the last two minutes of a 3–1 loss against Estudiantes on 7 March 2014. After the club won the title in 2013–14, they were promoted to Primera B Nacional which allowed Alzueta to make his professional bow on 4 July 2015 versus Unión Mar del Plata.

== Career statistics ==
As of 27 December 2018.

Club statistics
Club	Season	League			Cup (Note: Includes the Copa Argentina)		League Cup		Continental		Other		Total	
Club	Season	Division	Apps	Goals	Apps	Goals	Apps	Goals	Apps	Goals	Apps	Goals	Apps	Goals
Santamarina	2013–14	Torneo Argentino A	1	0	0	0	—		—		0	0	1	0
Santamarina	2014	Primera B Nacional	0	0	0	0	—		—		0	0	0	0
Santamarina	2015	Primera B Nacional	3	0	0	0	—		—		0	0	3	0
Santamarina	2016	Primera B Nacional	1	0	0	0	—		—		0	0	1	0
Santamarina	2016–17	Primera B Nacional	6	0	1	0	—		—		0	0	7	0
Santamarina	2017–18	Primera B Nacional	2	0	0	0	—		—		0	0	2	0
Santamarina	2018–19	Primera B Nacional	0	0	0	0	—		—		0	0	0	0
Career total			13	0	1	0	—		—		0	0	14	0

== Honours ==
Santamarina

- Torneo Argentino A: 2013–14
