= Diego Galeano (footballer) =

Argentine footballer (born 1986)

Personal information
- Full name: Diego Alejandro Galeano
- Date of birth: 24 February 1986 (age 40)
- Place of birth: Mar del Plata, Argentina
- Height: 1.66 m (5 ft 5 in)
- Position: Winger

Team information
- Current team: Los Andes

Senior career*
| Years | Team | Apps | (Gls) |
| 2004–2006 | Banfield (MdP) | 3 | (3) |
| 2007–2010 | Banfield (BA) | 3 | (0) |
| 2010–2011 | Doxa Katokopias | 21 | (3) |
| 2011 | Sportivo Patria | 3 | (1) |
| 2012 | Alvarado | 19 | (5) |
| 2012–2013 | Unión Mar del Plata | 25 | (4) |
| 2013–2014 | Santamarina | 20 | (2) |
| 2014–2015 | Los Andes | 52 | (7) |
| 2016 | Boca Unidos | 19 | (0) |
| 2017–2019 | Barracas Central | 47 | (8) |
| 2019– | Los Andes | 28 | (2) |
- * Club domestic league appearances and goals as of 16:24, 7 August 2022 (UTC)

Diego Alejandro Galeano (born 24 February 1986) is an Argentine professional footballer who plays as a winger for Club Atlético Los Andes.

== Career ==
Galeano started his career in Mar del Plata with Banfield, netting three goals in as many games which secured a move to Primera División side Banfield of Buenos Aires. He featured three times in the top-flight, before departing in June 2010 to Cypriot First Division side Doxa Katokopias. He made his debut on 29 August as Doxa lost 4–0 to Apollon Limassol, which was the first of twenty-one league matches for them. He also scored four goals in Cyprus' top division, scoring against Anorthosis Famagusta on 13 February before notching a brace over APOP Kinyras Peyias; he had also scored in the Cypriot Cup versus AEK Larnaca in January.

Midway through 2011, Galeano returned to Argentina with Torneo Argentino B's Sportivo Patria. One goal in three fixtures followed. Months later, Galeano sealed a move across the league to Alvarado. He left ahead of 2012–13, subsequently signing for Torneo Argentino A team Unión Mar del Plata. He netted four goals in one season with the club, two of which came against Guillermo Brown while one came versus ex-club Alvarado. After spending 2013–14 with Santamarina, where he won the league title, Galeano went to Primera B Metropolitana's Los Andes. He again won promotion, as Los Andes rose to Primera B Nacional.

An eleventh-place finish occurred in tier two with Los Andes, which preceded Galeano signing for Boca Unidos on 3 February 2016. He remained for two seasons, with nineteen appearances arriving. Barracas Central became Galeano's tenth senior team in January 2017. He scored eight goals in the 2017–18 Primera B Metropolitana as they reached the play-offs, though would miss out after losing in the first round to Defensores de Belgrano. However, in 2018–19, Barracas Central would win promotion as they won tier three's league title for the first time.

== Career statistics ==
As of 3 May 2019.

Appearances and goals by club, season and competition
| Club | Season | League | | | Cup | | League Cup | | Continental | | Other | | Total | |
| Club | Season | Division | Apps | Goals | Apps | Goals | Apps | Goals | Apps | Goals | Apps | Goals | Apps | Goals |
|---|---|---|---|---|---|---|---|---|---|---|---|---|---|---|
| Doxa Katokopias | 2010–11 | First Division | 21 | 3 | 0 | 0 | — | | — | | 0 | 0 | 21 | 3 |
| Sportivo Patria | 2011–12 | Torneo Argentino B | 3 | 1 | 0 | 0 | — | | — | | 0 | 0 | 3 | 1 |
| Alvarado | 2011–12 | Torneo Argentino B | 19 | 5 | 0 | 0 | — | | — | | 0 | 0 | 19 | 5 |
| Unión Mar del Plata | 2012–13 | Torneo Argentino A | 25 | 4 | 1 | 0 | — | | — | | 0 | 0 | 26 | 4 |
| Santamarina | 2013–14 | Torneo Argentino A | 20 | 2 | 5 | 0 | — | | — | | 0 | 0 | 25 | 2 |
| Los Andes | 2014 | Primera B Metropolitana | 18 | 2 | 0 | 0 | — | | — | | 0 | 0 | 18 | 2 |
| Los Andes | 2015 | Primera B Nacional | 34 | 5 | 1 | 1 | — | | — | | 0 | 0 | 35 | 6 |
| Los Andes | Total | | 52 | 7 | 1 | 1 | — | | — | | 0 | 0 | 53 | 8 |
| Boca Unidos | 2016 | Primera B Nacional | 10 | 0 | 0 | 0 | — | | — | | 0 | 0 | 10 | 0 |
| Boca Unidos | 2016–17 | Primera B Nacional | 9 | 0 | 0 | 0 | — | | — | | 0 | 0 | 9 | 0 |
| Boca Unidos | Total | | 19 | 0 | 0 | 0 | — | | — | | 0 | 0 | 19 | 0 |
| Barracas Central | 2016–17 | Primera B Metropolitana | 6 | 0 | 0 | 0 | — | | — | | 1 (Note: Appearance(s) in the Primera B Metropolitana play-offs) | 0 | 7 | 0 |
| Barracas Central | 2017–18 | Primera B Metropolitana | 22 | 8 | 0 | 0 | — | | — | | 0 | 0 | 22 | 8 |
| Barracas Central | 2018–19 | Primera B Metropolitana | 16 | 0 | 0 | 0 | — | | — | | 0 | 0 | 16 | 0 |
| Barracas Central | Total | | 44 | 8 | 0 | 0 | — | | — | | 1 | 0 | 45 | 8 |
| Career total | | | 203 | 30 | 7 | 1 | — | | — | | 1 | 0 | 211 | 31 |

== Honours ==
Banfield

- Primera División: 2009–10 Apertura

Santamarina

- Torneo Argentino A: 2013–14

Barracas Central

- Primera B Metropolitana: 2018–19
