= Agustín Politano =

Argentine footballer

Personal information
- Full name: Agustín Politano de Pradal
- Date of birth: 24 November 1992 (age 33)
- Place of birth: Tandil, Argentina
- Height: 1.68 m (5 ft 6 in)
- Position: Defender

Team information
- Current team: Güemes

Senior career*
Years	Team	Apps	(Gls)
2013–2019	Santamarina	85	(0)
2019–	Güemes	1	(0)
- * Club domestic league appearances and goals as of 00:06, 23 November 2019 (UTC)

Agustín Politano de Pradal (born 24 November 1992) is an Argentine professional footballer who plays as a defender for Güemes.

== Career ==
Politano began his career with Santamarina. He was selected for his professional debut in March 2013 by Gustavo Coleoni, who substituted the defender on after fifty minutes of a goalless draw with Sportivo Desamparados in Torneo Argentino A. Politano didn't appear in either of the next two seasons, though featured in fixtures with Estudiantes and Sportivo Belgrano in the 2015 Primera B Nacional campaign; with the match at home to Estudiantes being his professional bow. He featured more regularly in 2016, 2016–17 and 2017–18 when he made sixty-three appearances.

== Career statistics ==
As of 23 December 2018.

Club statistics
Club	Season	League			Cup (Note: Includes the Copa Argentina)		League Cup		Continental		Other		Total	
Club	Season	Division	Apps	Goals	Apps	Goals	Apps	Goals	Apps	Goals	Apps	Goals	Apps	Goals
Santamarina	2012–13	Torneo Argentino A	1	0	0	0	—		—		0	0	1	0
Santamarina	2013–14	Torneo Argentino A	0	0	0	0	—		—		0	0	0	0
Santamarina	2014	Primera B Nacional	0	0	0	0	—		—		0	0	0	0
Santamarina	2015	Primera B Nacional	2	0	0	0	—		—		0	0	2	0
Santamarina	2016	Primera B Nacional	21	0	0	0	—		—		0	0	21	0
Santamarina	2016–17	Primera B Nacional	19	0	2	0	—		—		0	0	21	0
Santamarina	2017–18	Primera B Nacional	23	0	0	0	—		—		0	0	23	0
Santamarina	2018–19	Primera B Nacional	10	0	0	0	—		—		0	0	10	0
Career total			76	0	2	0	—		—		0	0	78	0
