= Marcos Quiroga (footballer, born 1990) =

Argentine footballer

Personal information
- Full name: Marcos Daniel Quiroga
- Date of birth: 28 November 1990 (age 35)
- Place of birth: Sunchales, Argentina
- Height: 1.76 m (5 ft 9 1/2 in)
- Position: Midfielder

Team information
- Current team: Ben Hur

Senior career*
Years	Team	Apps	(Gls)
2007–2011	Libertad		
2011	Boca Unidos	0	(0)
2012–2014	Libertad		
2014	Sportivo Patria	12	(1)
2015–2016	Patronato	41	(2)
2016–2017	Instituto	14	(1)
2017–2018	Juventud Unida	15	(0)
2018–2019	Los Andes	12	(1)
2019	Ferrocarril del Estado		
2020–	Ben Hur	3	(0)
- * Club domestic league appearances and goals as of 13:28, 8 October 2020 (UTC)

Marcos Daniel Quiroga (born 28 November 1990) is an Argentine professional footballer who plays as a midfielder for Ben Hur.

== Career ==
Libertad were Quiroga's opening club. After four years in Sunchales, he moved to Boca Unidos in 2011 prior to the Torneo Argentino A side Libertad resigning Quiroga midway through the 2011–12 season. Fifty-eight appearances followed, along with five goals which includes two goals against both Central Norte and Central Córdoba. After a six-month stint with Sportivo Patria in the third tier, Quiroga joined Patronato of Primera B Nacional. His first campaign ended with promotion to the Primera División. His top-flight debut arrived on 17 February 2016 versus Arsenal de Sarandí, an appearance against Quilmes followed.

Quiroga returned to Primera B Nacional in June 2016 with Instituto, before Juventud Unida became the midfielder's sixth senior team just over a year later. On 30 May 2018, after relegation with Juventud Unida, Quiroga signed for Los Andes. His first appearance came in a defeat at the Estadio Centenario to Quilmes on 3 September. He scored one goal, versus Defensores de Belgrano, in twelve games as they suffered relegation. Having left Los Andes in June 2019, Quiroga signed for Ferrocarril del Estado of Liga Rafaelina in July. Ahead of January 2020, Quiroga agreed a move to Ben Hur in Torneo Regional Federal Amateur.

== Career statistics ==
As of 8 October 2020.

Appearances and goals by club, season and competition
Club	Season	League			Cup		League Cup		Continental		Other		Total	
Club	Season	Division	Apps	Goals	Apps	Goals	Apps	Goals	Apps	Goals	Apps	Goals	Apps	Goals
Boca Unidos	2011–12	Primera B Nacional	0	0	0	0	—		—		0	0	0	0
Libertad	2012–13	Torneo Argentino A	26	2	1	0	—		—		6 (Note: Appearance(s) in the Torneo Argentino A play-offs)	0	33	2
Libertad	2013–14	Torneo Argentino A	24	3	2	0	—		—		2	0	28	3
Libertad	Total		50	5	3	0	—		—		8	0	61	5
Sportivo Patria	2014	Torneo Federal A	12	1	0	0	—		—		6 (Note: Appearance(s) in the Torneo Federal A play-offs)	0	18	1
Patronato	2015	Primera B Nacional	39	2	0	0	—		—		4 (Note: Appearance(s) in the Primera B Nacional play-offs)	0	43	2
Patronato	2016	Primera División	2	0	0	0	—		—		0	0	2	0
Patronato	Total		41	2	0	0	—		—		4	0	45	2
Instituto	2016–17	Primera B Nacional	14	1	1	0	—		—		0	0	15	1
Juventud Unida	2017–18	Primera B Nacional	15	0	0	0	—		—		0	0	15	0
Los Andes	2018–19	Primera B Nacional	12	1	0	0	—		—		0	0	12	1
Ben Hur	2020	Torneo Amateur	3	0	0	0	—		—		0	0	3	0
Career total			147	10	4	0	—		—		18	0	169	10
