= Nicolás Valerio =

Argentine footballer

Personal information
- Full name: Nicolás Antonio Valerio
- Date of birth: 18 August 1992 (age 34)
- Place of birth: Tandil, Argentina
- Height: 1.75 m (5 ft 9 in)
- Position: Midfielder

Team information
- Current team: Santamarina

Youth career
- Santamarina

Senior career*
Years	Team	Apps	(Gls)
2012–	Santamarina	79	(4)
- * Club domestic league appearances and goals as of 21:01, 1 August 2022 (UTC)

Nicolás Antonio Valerio (born 18 August 1992) is an Argentine professional footballer who plays as a midfielder for Santamarina.

== Career ==
Valerio's career began with Santamarina. He made his senior bow on 21 November 2012 during a Copa Argentina match with Grupo Universitario, prior to scoring on his league debut in the following February against Rivadavia in Torneo Argentino A. Further goals against San Jorge and Talleres followed in the 2012–13 campaign. Valerio featured twice in the following season, which concluded with promotion to Primera B Nacional as champions. He netted his first goal in the second tier on 13 April 2015 during a 1–0 victory over Instituto.

== Personal life ==
Valerio is the brother of fellow footballer Rodolfo Valerio.

== Career statistics ==
As of 27 December 2018.

Club statistics
Club	Season	League			Cup (Note: Includes the Copa Argentina)		League Cup		Continental		Other		Total	
Club	Season	Division	Apps	Goals	Apps	Goals	Apps	Goals	Apps	Goals	Apps	Goals	Apps	Goals
Santamarina	2012–13	Torneo Argentino A	6	3	1	0	—		—		6 (Note: Six appearances in the 2012–13 Torneo Argentino A play-offs)	0	13	3
Santamarina	2013–14	Torneo Argentino A	2	0	2	0	—		—		0	0	4	0
Santamarina	2014	Primera B Nacional	0	0	0	0	—		—		0	0	0	0
Santamarina	2015	Primera B Nacional	12	1	0	0	—		—		0	0	12	1
Santamarina	2016	Primera B Nacional	9	0	0	0	—		—		0	0	9	0
Santamarina	2016–17	Primera B Nacional	6	0	0	0	—		—		0	0	6	0
Santamarina	2017–18	Primera B Nacional	8	0	0	0	—		—		0	0	8	0
Santamarina	2018–19	Primera B Nacional	0	0	0	0	—		—		0	0	0	0
Career total			43	4	3	0	—		—		6	0	52	4

== Honours ==
Santamarina

- Torneo Argentino A: 2013–14
