= Román Strada =

Argentine footballer

Personal information
- Full name: Román Alex Strada
- Date of birth: 16 August 1987 (age 39)
- Place of birth: Monte Buey, Argentina
- Height: 1.80 m (5 ft 11 in)
- Position: Midfielder

Youth career
- Chacarita Juniors

Senior career*
| Years | Team | Apps | (Gls) |
- Matienzo de Monte Buey
| 2009–2012 | Alumni | 64 | (9) |
| 2011–2012 | → Talleres (loan) | 22 | (5) |
| 2012–2015 | Santamarina | 87 | (9) |
| 2015–2016 | Douglas Haig | 31 | (3) |
| 2016–2017 | Guillermo Brown | 40 | (7) |
| 2017–2018 | Quilmes | 13 | (1) |
| 2018–2019 | Mitre | 14 | (0) |
| 2019 | Santamarina | 13 | (0) |
| 2020–2021 | Sportivo Belgrano | 25 | (2) |
- * Club domestic league appearances and goals

Román Alex Strada (born 16 August 1987) is a retired Argentine professional footballer who played as a midfielder.

== Career ==
Strada played for Chacarita Juniors' youth, before featuring at senior level with Matienzo de Monte Buey. Then came a move to Torneo Argentino A's Alumni. He netted nine goals in two seasons with them, most notably notching a brace against Estudiantes on 2 December 2010. Fellow tier three side Talleres loaned Strada in June 2011. Five goals in twenty-three matches followed, prior to the midfielder joining Santamarina on 31 July 2012. He scored two goals in his first three starts, which were the first of twelve for the club over three years. His last strike came versus Douglas Haig, who then signed Strada in 2015.

He departed Douglas Haig at the conclusion of the 2016 Primera B Nacional. After stints with Guillermo Brown (2016–17) and Quilmes (2017–18), Strada joined fellow Primera B Nacional side Mitre in June 2018. He made his club debut on 26 August against Platense, a match Mitre won 0–1. After a spell at Sportivo Belgrano, Strada retired in September 2021.

== Career statistics ==
As of 11 December 2018.

Club statistics
| Club | Season | League | | | Cup (Note: Includes the Copa Argentina) | | League Cup | | Continental | | Other | | Total | |
| Club | Season | Division | Apps | Goals | Apps | Goals | Apps | Goals | Apps | Goals | Apps | Goals | Apps | Goals |
|---|---|---|---|---|---|---|---|---|---|---|---|---|---|---|
| Talleres (loan) | 2011–12 | Torneo Argentino A | 22 | 5 | 1 | 0 | — | | — | | 0 | 0 | 23 | 5 |
| Santamarina | 2012–13 | Torneo Argentino A | 26 | 3 | 2 | 0 | — | | — | | 6 (Note: Six appearances in the 2012–13 Torneo Argentino A play-offs) | 2 (Note: Two goals in the 2012–13 Torneo Argentino A play-offs) | 34 | 5 |
| Santamarina | 2013–14 | Torneo Argentino A | 26 | 2 | 3 | 1 | — | | — | | 0 | 0 | 29 | 3 |
| Santamarina | 2014 | Primera B Nacional | 17 | 3 | 0 | 0 | — | | — | | 0 | 0 | 17 | 3 |
| Santamarina | 2015 | Primera B Nacional | 18 | 1 | 1 | 0 | — | | — | | 0 | 0 | 19 | 1 |
| Santamarina | Total | | 87 | 9 | 7 | 1 | — | | — | | 6 | 2 | 100 | 12 |
| Douglas Haig | 2015 | Primera B Nacional | 15 | 0 | 0 | 0 | — | | — | | 0 | 0 | 15 | 0 |
| Douglas Haig | 2016 | Primera B Nacional | 16 | 3 | 1 | 0 | — | | — | | 0 | 0 | 17 | 3 |
| Douglas Haig | Total | | 31 | 3 | 1 | 0 | — | | — | | 0 | 0 | 32 | 3 |
| Guillermo Brown | 2016–17 | Primera B Nacional | 40 | 7 | 0 | 0 | — | | — | | 0 | 0 | 40 | 7 |
| Quilmes | 2017–18 | Primera B Nacional | 13 | 1 | 0 | 0 | — | | — | | 0 | 0 | 13 | 1 |
| Mitre | 2018–19 | Primera B Nacional | 9 | 0 | 0 | 0 | — | | — | | 0 | 0 | 9 | 0 |
| Career total | | | 202 | 25 | 8 | 1 | — | | — | | 6 | 2 | 216 | 28 |

== Honours ==
Santamarina

- Torneo Argentino A: 2013–14
