= Matías Gutiérrez =

Matías Gutiérrez may refer to:

- Matías Gutiérrez (Argentine footballer) (born 1994), Argentine midfielder
- Matías Gutiérrez (Chilean footballer) (born 1994), Chilean defender
