= Joaquín Papaleo =

Argentine footballer

Personal information
- Full name: Joaquín Matías Papaleo
- Date of birth: 23 March 1994 (age 32)
- Place of birth: Santo Tomé, Argentina
- Height: 1.88 m (6 ft 2 in)
- Position: Goalkeeper

Team information
- Current team: Gimnasia y Tiro

Youth career
- Unión Santa Fe

Senior career*
Years	Team	Apps	(Gls)
2014–2021	Unión Santa Fe	1	(0)
2016–2017	→ Santamarina (loan)	42	(0)
2017–2018	→ Santamarina (loan)	24	(0)
2019–2020	→ Santamarina (loan)	20	(0)
2020	→ Temperley (loan)	8	(0)
2021–2022	Temperley	24	(0)
2022–2023	Güemes	34	(0)
2023–2024	Sportivo Ameliano	39	(0)
2024	Deportivo Cali	4	(0)
2024–2026	Instituto	1	(0)
2026–	Gimnasia y Tiro	4	(0)
- * Club domestic league appearances and goals as of 18:25, 16 March 2026 (UTC)

Joaquín Matías Papaleo (born 23 March 1994) is an Argentine professional footballer who plays as a goalkeeper for Gimnasia y Tiro.

== Career ==
Papaleo started his career with Unión Santa Fe. He was part of the club's squad for the 2014, 2015 and 2016 seasons, appearing on the substitutes bench twenty-six times but failing to make an appearance. In July 2016, Papaleo joined Primera B Nacional side Santamarina on loan. He made forty-five appearances in 2016–17, which preceded Santamarina resigning Papaleo for the 2017–18 Primera B Nacional after he had returned to Unión. Papaleo was selected in a further twenty-four fixtures. He returned to Unión in July 2018, subsequently making his club debut on 2 September in the Santa Fe derby against Colón.

A third loan move to Santamarina was completed in July 2019. Twenty appearances followed. In September 2020, Papaleo was unveiled as a new loan signing for Temperley for the rest of 2020. On 10 February 2021, Papaleo terminated his contract with Union and signed a permanent one-year deal with Temperley. On 3 January 2022, 27-year old Papaleo joined fellow league club Club Atlético Güemes on a one-year deal.

At the end of December 2022, Papaleo joined Paraguayan club Sportivo Ameliano.

== Career statistics ==
As of 6 September 2020.

Club statistics
Club	Season	League			Cup		League Cup		Continental		Other		Total	
Club	Season	Division	Apps	Goals	Apps	Goals	Apps	Goals	Apps	Goals	Apps	Goals	Apps	Goals
Unión Santa Fe	2014	Primera B Nacional	0	0	0	0	—		—		0	0	0	0
Unión Santa Fe	2015	Primera División	0	0	0	0	—		—		0	0	0	0
Unión Santa Fe	2016	Primera División	0	0	0	0	—		—		0	0	0	0
Unión Santa Fe	2016–17	Primera División	0	0	0	0	—		—		0	0	0	0
Unión Santa Fe	2017–18	Primera División	0	0	0	0	—		—		0	0	0	0
Unión Santa Fe	2018–19	Primera División	1	0	0	0	0	0	0	0	0	0	1	0
Unión Santa Fe	2019–20	Primera División	0	0	0	0	0	0	0	0	0	0	0	0
Unión Santa Fe	2020–21	Primera División	0	0	0	0	0	0	—		0	0	0	0
Unión Santa Fe	Total		1	0	0	0	0	0	0	0	0	0	1	0
Santamarina (loan)	2016–17	Primera B Nacional	42	0	3	0	—		—		0	0	45	0
Santamarina (loan)	2017–18	Primera B Nacional	24	0	0	0	—		—		0	0	24	0
Santamarina (loan)	2019–20	Primera B Nacional	20	0	0	0	—		—		0	0	20	0
Santamarina (loan)	Total		86	0	3	0	—		—		0	0	89	0
Temperley (loan)	2020–21	Primera B Nacional	0	0	0	0	—		—		0	0	0	0
Career total			87	0	3	0	—		—		0	0	90	0
