= Tomás Pérez (disambiguation) =

Tomás Pérez (born 1973) is a Venezuelan former baseball player.

Tomás Pérez may also refer to:

- Tomás Pérez Guerra (1766–1846), Puerto Rican politician
- Tomás Pérez Serra (born 1998), Argentine footballer
- Tomás Pérez (footballer) (born 2005), Argentine footballer

== See also ==
- Tom Perez
