= Leonel Pierce =

Argentine footballer

Personal information
- Full name: Michael Leonel Pierce
- Date of birth: 28 July 1993 (age 33)
- Place of birth: Chacabuco, Argentina
- Height: 1.77 m (5 ft 9 1/2 in)
- Position: Defensive midfielder

Team information
- Current team: Gravina

Youth career
- Racing Club

Senior career*
Years	Team	Apps	(Gls)
2013–2017	Racing Club	1	(0)
2015	→ All Boys (loan)	15	(0)
2016–2017	→ Santamarina (loan)	53	(2)
2017–2019	Santamarina	42	(3)
2019	Botoșani	6	(0)
2020	Petrolul Ploiești	7	(0)
2020	Estudiantes de Buenos Aires	8	(0)
2021	Santamarina	24	(0)
2022	Deportivo Maipú	33	(0)
2023	General Caballero JLM	4	(0)
2023	San Martín de Tucumán	10	(1)
2024	Lanzarote	18	(0)
2024–	Gravina	12	(0)
- * Club domestic league appearances and goals as of 17 November 2024

Michael Leonel Pierce (born 28 July 1993) is an Argentine professional footballer who plays as a defensive midfielder for Italian Serie D club Gravina.

== Career ==
=== Racing Club ===
Racing Club were Pierce's first senior club. He appeared on their substitutes bench under Carlos Ischia in September 2013 for a 3–0 loss to Belgrano, before making his pro debut seven months later for Reinaldo Merlo's team against Quilmes on 26 April 2014.

=== All Boys (loan) ===
In 2015, Pierce was loaned to All Boys of Primera B Nacional. Sixteen appearances in all competitions followed as they finished fourteenth.

=== Santamarina (loan) ===
January 2016 saw the midfielder join Santamarina on loan. He remained for two seasons, notably scoring his first two goals versus Brown on 25 March 2017.

=== Santamarina ===
In September, Santamarina completed the permanent signing of Pierce.

=== Botoșani ===
On 11 June 2019, Pierce joined Romania's Botoșani of Liga I. His competitive bow arrived in a 2–2 draw away to Astra Giurgiu on 13 July.

=== Petrolul Ploiești ===
On 20 January 2020, Petrolul Ploiești announced that it signed a contract with Leonel Pierce.

== Career statistics ==
As of 13 August 2019.

Club statistics
Club	Season	League			Cup		League Cup		Continental		Other		Total	
Club	Season	Division	Apps	Goals	Apps	Goals	Apps	Goals	Apps	Goals	Apps	Goals	Apps	Goals
Racing Club	2013–14	Primera División	1	0	0	0	—		0	0	0	0	1	0
Racing Club	2014	Primera División	0	0	0	0	—		—		0	0	0	0
Racing Club	2015	Primera División	0	0	0	0	—		0	0	0	0	0	0
Racing Club	2016	Primera División	0	0	0	0	—		0	0	0	0	0	0
Racing Club	2016–17	Primera División	0	0	0	0	—		0	0	0	0	0	0
Racing Club	Total		1	0	0	0	—		0	0	0	0	1	0
All Boys (loan)	2015	Primera B Nacional	15	0	1	0	—		—		0	0	16	0
Santamarina (loan)	2016	Primera B Nacional	18	0	0	0	—		—		0	0	18	0
Santamarina (loan)	2016–17	Primera B Nacional	35	2	3	0	—		—		0	0	38	2
Santamarina	2017–18	Primera B Nacional	22	3	0	0	—		—		0	0	22	3
Santamarina	2018–19	Primera B Nacional	20	0	0	0	—		—		0	0	20	0
Santamarina	Total		95	5	3	0	—		—		0	0	98	5
Botoșani	2019–20	Liga I	1	0	0	0	—		—		0	0	1	0
Career total			112	5	4	0	—		0	0	0	0	116	5
