= Guido Rancez =

Argentine footballer

Personal information
- Full name: Guido Rancez
- Date of birth: 30 April 1990 (age 36)
- Place of birth: San Justo, Argentina
- Position: Midfielder

Team information
- Current team: Colón San Justo

Youth career
- Unión Santa Fe

Senior career*
Years	Team	Apps	(Gls)
- Colón San Justo
- Santa Fe Fútbol Club
2012–2014	Villa San Carlos	55	(2)
2014	Alianza Coronel Moldes	13	(3)
2015–2017	Atlético Paraná	43	(2)
2017–2018	Ferro General Pico	22	(0)
2018–2019	Santamarina	9	(2)
2019–2020	Chaco For Ever	10	(1)
2021–2023	US Ghilarza		
2023	Hamar	15	(12)
2023–	Colón San Justo	11	(1)
- * Club domestic league appearances and goals as of 21:02, 14 February 2024 (UTC)

Guido Rancez (born 30 April 1990) is an Argentine professional footballer who plays as a midfielder for Italian club US Ghilarza Calcio.

== Career ==
Rancez played for Unión Santa Fe's youth, before appearing at senior level with Colón de San Justo and Santa Fe Fútbol Club. He joined Villa San Carlos in 2012, making his professional debut in a Primera B Metropolitana draw with Brown on 5 August. Towards the end of the 2012–13 Primera B Metropolitana season, which ended with promotion as champions to Primera B Nacional, Rancez scored the first two goals of his career in games against Almagro and Central Córdoba. He then featured seventeen more times for Villa San Carlos. On 30 June 2014, Rancez was signed by Torneo Federal B's Alianza Coronel Moldes.

After three goals in thirteen fixtures in the fourth tier, Rancez joined Atlético Paraná of Primera B Nacional. He netted his first goal for them in his first appearance, scoring in a 3–2 loss away to Estudinates on 29 March 2015. In total, Rancez remained with the club for three seasons; featuring in forty-three fixtures whilst getting two goals, the last of which came against Santamarina in 2016–17 which saw relegation to Primera B Metropolitana confirmed. Rancez spent the entirety of 2017–18 in Torneo Federal A with Ferro Carril Oeste. Twenty-four appearances followed. A move to Santamarina was completed on 30 June 2018.

In August 2021, Rancez moved abroad and joined Italian Eccellenza side US Ghilarza Calcio. On April 27, 2023, Rancez moved to Icelandic fifth and second-lowest division club Hamar, which was playing in the Icelandic 4. deild karla. In October 2023, he returned to his former club, Colón San Justo.

== Career statistics ==
As of 26 December 2018.

Club statistics
Club	Season	League			Cup (Note: Includes the Copa Argentina)		League Cup		Continental		Other		Total	
Club	Season	Division	Apps	Goals	Apps	Goals	Apps	Goals	Apps	Goals	Apps	Goals	Apps	Goals
Villa San Carlos	2012–13	Primera B Metropolitana	38	2	0	0	—		—		0	0	38	2
Villa San Carlos	2013–14	Primera B Nacional	17	0	1	0	—		—		0	0	18	0
Villa San Carlos	Total		55	2	1	0	—		—		0	0	56	2
Alianza Coronel Moldes	2014	Torneo Federal B	13	3	3	0	—		—		0	0	16	3
Atlético Paraná	2015	Primera B Nacional	16	1	0	0	—		—		0	0	16	1
Atlético Paraná	2016	Primera B Nacional	6	0	0	0	—		—		0	0	6	0
Atlético Paraná	2016–17	Primera B Nacional	21	1	0	0	—		—		0	0	21	1
Atlético Paraná	Total		43	2	0	0	—		—		0	0	43	2
Ferro Carril Oeste	2017–18	Torneo Federal A	22	0	2	0	—		—		2 (Note: Two appearances in the 2017–18 Torneo Federal A play-offs)	0	26	0
Santamarina	2018–19	Primera B Nacional	4	0	0	0	—		—		0	0	4	0
Career total			137	7	6	0	—		—		2	0	145	7

== Honours ==
Villa San Carlos

- Primera B Metropolitana: 2012–13
