= Martín Michel (footballer) =

Argentine footballer

Personal information
- Full name: Martín Esteban Michel
- Date of birth: 4 October 1983 (age 43)
- Place of birth: Tandil, Argentina
- Height: 1.74 m (5 ft 8 1/2 in)
- Position: Forward

Team information
- Current team: Santamarina

Youth career
- Grupo Universitario

Senior career*
Years	Team	Apps	(Gls)
2001–2002	Grupo Universitario		
2002	Ateneo Estrada		
2003–2004	Atlético Ayacucho		
2004	Ferroviario de Coronel Dorrego		
2004–2008	Grupo Universitario		
2008–2009	Quilmes	2	(0)
2009–2010	Grupo Universitario		
2010–2011	Universitario de Sucre	22	(3)
2011–2015	Santamarina	101	(24)
2016	Gimnasia Jujuy	14	(1)
2016–	Santamarina	140	(32)
- * Club domestic league appearances and goals as of 20:00, 2 August 2022 (UTC)

Martín Esteban Michel (born 4 October 1983) is an Argentine professional footballer who plays as a forward for Santamarina.

== Career ==
Grupo Universitario were Michel's first team. After playing for them in the 2001–02 Torneo Argentino B, he had stints with Ateneo Estrada, Atlético Ayacucho and Ferroviario de Coronel Dorrego. Michel rejoined Grupo Universitario in 2004, remaining for a total of four years. Ahead of the 2008–09 Primera B Nacional campaign, Michel joined Quilmes. His professional debut came on 16 August 2008 against San Martín. Michel played just twice for Quilmes, departing in 2009 for a third spell back with Grupo Universitario. In total, he scored thirty-three times in one hundred and nine appearances for them.

On 31 July 2010, Michel completed a move to Bolivian Primera División side Universitario de Sucre. He scored against Guabirá, Nacional Potosí and La Paz across the 2010 and 2011 campaigns in Bolivia. 2011 saw Michel return to his homeland with Santamarina. Nineteen goals followed across sixty-one appearances in Torneo Argentino A, some of which came in 2013–14 which Santamarina ended as champions. He spent two more years there, prior to spending a season with Gimnasia y Esgrima in 2016. Having scored one in fourteen games, Michel sealed a return to Santamarina on 30 June 2016.

== Career statistics ==
As of 28 December 2018.

Club statistics
Club	Season	League			Cup		Continental		Other		Total	
Club	Season	Division	Apps	Goals	Apps	Goals	Apps	Goals	Apps	Goals	Apps	Goals
Quilmes	2008–09	Primera B Nacional	2	0	0	0	—		0	0	2	0
Universitario de Sucre	2010	Primera División	4	0	—		3 (Note: Appearance(s) in the Copa Sudamericana)	0	0	0	7	0
Universitario de Sucre	2011	Primera División	18	3	—		—		0	0	18	3
Universitario de Sucre	Total		22	3	—		3	0	0	0	25	3
Santamarina	2011–12	Torneo Argentino A	18	5	1	1	—		0	0	19	6
Santamarina	2012–13	Torneo Argentino A	21	7	0	0	—		5 (Note: Appearance(s) in the Torneo Argentino A play-offs)	4	26	11
Santamarina	2013–14	Torneo Argentino A	17	3	1	0	—		0	0	18	3
Santamarina	2014	Primera B Nacional	13	4	0	0	—		0	0	13	4
Santamarina	2015	Primera B Nacional	32	5	1	1	—		4 (Note: Appearance(s) in the Primera B Nacional play-offs)	1	37	7
Santamarina	Total		101	24	3	2	—		9	5	113	31
Gimnasia y Esgrima	2016	Primera B Nacional	14	1	0	0	—		0	0	14	1
Santamarina	2016–17	Primera B Nacional	32	12	2	2	—		0	0	34	14
Santamarina	2017–18	Primera B Nacional	13	7	0	0	—		0	0	13	7
Santamarina	2018–19	Primera B Nacional	9	0	0	0	—		0	0	9	0
Santamarina	Total		54	19	2	2	—		0	0	56	21
Career total			193	47	5	4	3	0	9	5	210	56

== Honours ==
Santamarina

- Torneo Argentino A: 2013–14
