= Diego Galeano =

Diego Galeano may refer to:

- Diego Galeano (footballer) (born 1986), Argentine professional footballer
- Diego Galeano (tennis) (born 1992), Paraguayan professional tennis player
