= Fernando Telechea =

Argentine footballer (born 1981)

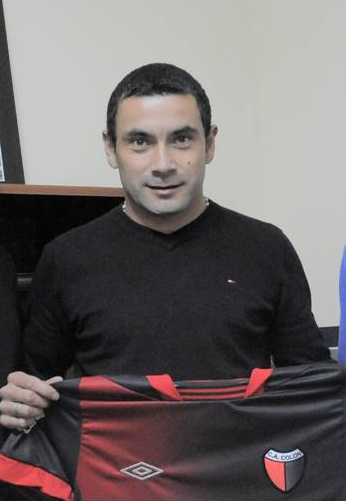
- Fernando Telechea in 2014.

Personal information
- Full name: Fernando Daniel Telechea
- Date of birth: 6 October 1981 (age 45)
- Place of birth: Balcarce, Argentina
- Height: 1.80 m (5 ft 11 in)
- Position: Forward

Youth career
- Pinta
- Boca Juniors
- Racing de Balcarce

Senior career*
Years	Team	Apps	(Gls)
- Union de Balcarce
- Racing de Balcarce
- Almagro Florida
2006	Deportivo Norte		
2006–2007	Villa del Parque	26	(16)
2007–2009	Alvarado	55	(23)
2009–2010	Santamarina	33	(8)
2010–2011	Tigre	20	(1)
2011–2014	Quilmes	70	(13)
2014	Colón	16	(1)
2015	Santamarina	36	(20)
2016–2017	Patronato	39	(7)
2017–2018	Aldosivi	30	(12)
2018–2020	Santamarina	26	(5)
- * Club domestic league appearances and goals

Fernando Daniel Telechea (born 6 October 1981) is an Argentine retired professional footballer who played as a forward.

== Career ==
Telechea had youth periods with Pinta, Boca Juniors and Racing de Balcarce. He started his senior career with time in Union de Balcarce, Racing de Balcarce and Almagro Florida, prior to joining Deportivo Norte of Torneo Argentino C in 2006. Months later, he made the move to Torneo Argentino B side Villa del Parque and subsequently scored sixteen goals in twenty-six matches. In 2007, Alvarado signed Telechea. He remained for two years, featuring in fifty-five games and netting twenty-three times as the club won promotion in 2007–08 to Torneo Argentino A. June 2009 saw Telechea join Torneo Argentino A's Santamarina.

He scored eight goals in his debut season, including his first against Cipolletti on 22 November. In July 2010, Tigre in the Argentine Primera División added Telechea to their squad. He scored on his first start for Tigre, grabbing the second goal in a 2–0 victory versus Gimnasia y Esgrima. He departed Tigre at the end of the 2010–11 season following twenty appearances. He subsequently joined Primera B Nacional team Quilmes and scored eleven goals, notably four in one match against Guillermo Brown, in his opening campaign as Quilmes won promotion to the top-flight. Forty-nine apps and four goals followed over the next two seasons.

Telechea ended 2014 with a short spell with Colón in Primera B Nacional, playing a total of sixteen matches and scoring once. Telechea rejoined Santamarina, now in the second tier, for the 2015 season. On 25 April 2015, Telechea scored a hat-trick versus Chacarita Juniors. Those were three of twenty-two strikes in 2015, which led the club to the promotion play-off finals; where they were beat by Patronato. Subsequently, in January 2016, Patronato completed the signing of Telechea. His first Patronato goal arrived on his debut over San Lorenzo on 6 February. In July 2017, Telechea mutually terminated his Patronato contract.

Soon after, on 20 July, Telechea agreed to join recently relegated Primera División club Aldosivi in Primera B Nacional for 2017–18. He netted his 100th career goal in November 2017 against Brown. On 11 December 2018, Telechea rescinded his contract with Aldosivi. Ten days later, he secured a move to ex-club Santamarina; rejoining for a third time.

== Career statistics ==
As of 26 December 2018.

Club statistics
Club	Season	League			Cup (Note: Includes the Copa Argentina)		League Cup		Continental		Other		Total	
Club	Season	Division	Apps	Goals	Apps	Goals	Apps	Goals	Apps	Goals	Apps	Goals	Apps	Goals
Villa del Parque	2006–07	Torneo Argentino B	26	16	0	0	—		—		0	0	26	16
Alvarado	2007–08	Torneo Argentino B	31	17	0	0	—		—		0	0	31	17
Alvarado	2008–09	Torneo Argentino A	24	6	0	0	—		—		0	0	24	6
Alvarado	Total		55	23	0	0	—		—		0	0	55	23
Santamarina	2009–10	Torneo Argentino A	33	8	0	0	—		—		0	0	33	8
Tigre	2010–11	Primera División	20	1	0	0	—		—		0	0	20	1
Quilmes	2011–12	Primera B Nacional	23	11	0	0	—		—		0	0	23	11
Quilmes	2012–13	Primera División	20	0	1	1	—		—		0	0	21	1
Quilmes	2013–14	Primera División	27	2	1	1	—		—		0	0	28	3
Quilmes	Total		70	13	2	2	—		—		0	0	72	15
Colón	2014	Primera B Nacional	16	1	1	0	—		—		0	0	17	1
Santamarina	2015	Primera B Nacional	36	20	1	0	—		—		3 (Note: Three appearances in 2015 Primera B Nacional play-offs)	2 (Note: Two goals in 2015 Primera B Nacional play-offs)	40	22
Patronato	2016	Primera División	16	3	0	0	—		—		0	0	16	3
Patronato	2016–17	Primera División	23	4	3	0	—		—		0	0	26	4
Patronato	Total		39	7	3	0	—		—		0	0	42	7
Aldosivi	2017–18	Primera B Nacional	23	12	1	0	—		—		0	0	24	12
Aldosivi	2018–19	Primera División	7	0	1	0	—		—		0	0	8	0
Aldosivi	Total		30	12	2	0	—		—		0	0	32	12
Santamarina	2018–19	Primera B Nacional	0	0	0	0	—		—		0	0	0	0
Career total			325	101	9	2	—		—		3	2	337	105

== Honours ==
Aldosivi

- Primera B Nacional: 2017–18
