= Facundo Leiva =

Argentine footballer

Personal information
- Full name: Facundo Leiva
- Date of birth: 9 September 1997 (age 29)
- Place of birth: Argentina
- Position: Midfielder

Team information
- Current team: Atlas

Youth career
- Santamarina

Senior career*
Years	Team	Apps	(Gls)
2016–2018	Santamarina	49	(0)
2019-2024	Ituzaingó		
2025-	Atlas	1	(1)
- * Club domestic league appearances and goals as of 21:00, 1 August 2022 (UTC)

Facundo Leiva (born 10 September 1997) is an Argentine professional footballer who plays as a midfielder for Atlas.

== Career ==
Leiva was formed in Santamarina's youth system. In 2016, Leiva was loaned to Torneo Federal C's Unicen. Two years later, on 4 January 2018, he returned to the fifth tier of Argentine football by signing for Centro Social Velense on loan. However, on 12 January, Leiva was recalled by Santamarina manager Héctor Arzubialde to feature in the 2017–18 Primera B Nacional. He was firstly on the bench for a fixture with Juventud Unida on 18 March, before making his professional bow a week later during a draw with Agropecuario. He made five subsequent appearances as they finished bottom of the table.

== Career statistics ==
As of 26 December 2018.

Club statistics
Club	Season	League			Cup (Note: Includes the Copa Argentina)		League Cup		Continental		Other		Total	
Club	Season	Division	Apps	Goals	Apps	Goals	Apps	Goals	Apps	Goals	Apps	Goals	Apps	Goals
Santamarina	2016	Primera B Nacional	0	0	0	0	—		—		0	0	0	0
Santamarina	2016–17	Primera B Nacional	0	0	0	0	—		—		0	0	0	0
Santamarina	2017–18	Primera B Nacional	6	0	0	0	—		—		0	0	6	0
Santamarina	2018–19	Primera B Nacional	1	0	0	0	—		—		0	0	1	0
Santamarina	Total		7	0	0	0	—		—		0	0	7	0
Centro Social Velense (loan)	2018	Torneo Federal C	0	0	0	0	—		—		0	0	0	0
Career total			7	0	0	0	—		—		0	0	7	0
