= Gustavo Iturra =

Argentine footballer

Personal information
- Full name: Gustavo Javier Iturra Matus
- Date of birth: 6 April 1999 (age 27)
- Place of birth: Bariloche, Argentina
- Height: 1.69 m (5 ft 7 in)
- Position: Central midfielder

Youth career
- Rivadavia
- UTHGRA
- 2017–2019: Racing Club

Senior career*
Years	Team	Apps	(Gls)
2016	UTHGRA	–	(–)
2019–2023	Racing Club	0	(0)
2019–2021	→ Santamarina (loan)	22	(0)
2021	→ Unión La Calera (loan)	9	(0)
2022	→ FADEP (loan)	–	(–)
2023–2024	Deportes Rengo	30	(0)
2024	Estudiantes Unidos	7	(0)
- * Club domestic league appearances and goals as of 7 July 2025

Gustavo Javier Iturra Matus (born 6 April 1999) is an Argentine football player who plays as a central midfielder.

== Career ==
As a youth player, Iturra was with both Club Rivadavia and UTHGRA before joining the Racing youth system in 2017. He signed his first professional contract in 2019.

In 2019, Iturra was loaned to Santamarina, playing for them until 2021.

In 2021, he joined the Chilean Primera División club Unión La Calera on loan with an option to buy, thanks to the coach Luca Marcogiuseppe who coached him in Racing. He came along with Bruno Liuzzi, another Argentine footballer of Chilean descent, and took part in the Copa Chile and the Copa Libertadores.

Back to Racing, he was loaned to club FADEP (Fundación Amigos por el Deporte) in the 2022 Liga Mendocina. He ended his contract with Racing in March 2023.

In the second half of 2023, Iturra returned to Chile and signed with Deportes Rengo in the Segunda División Profesional.

Back to his homeland, Iturra joined Estudiantes Unidos in October 2024.

== Personal life ==
Both his father, Miguel or Patón as he is known, and his brothers have played for Club Rivadavia in his hometown. He is the uncle of his former teammate at the Racing Club reserves, Alexis Villarroel.

Iturra is of Chilean descent.
