= Matías Kabalin =

Argentine footballer

Personal information
- Full name: Matías Kabalin
- Date of birth: 26 October 1998 (age 28)
- Place of birth: Tandil, Argentina
- Height: 1.77 m (5 ft 10 in)
- Position: Midfielder

Team information
- Current team: Ferro Carril Oeste

Youth career
- Santamarina

Senior career*
Years	Team	Apps	(Gls)
2017–2021	Santamarina	69	(0)
2021–2022	Atenas	34	(0)
2023–2024	San Martín Tucumán	1	(0)
2024–2026	Mitre	50	(2)
2026–	Ferro Carril Oeste	7	(1)
- * Club domestic league appearances and goals as of 17:30, 11 April 2026 (UTC)

Matías Kabalin (born 26 October 1998) is an Argentine professional footballer who plays as a midfielder for Ferro Carril Oeste.

== Career ==
Kabalin's career began with Primera B Nacional's Santamarina. He was selected for his senior debut on 13 June 2017 for a Copa Argentina tie with Godoy Cruz, coming off the substitutes bench in a 3–0 defeat to the Argentine Primera División club. His league bow followed on 26 June against Chacarita Juniors, which was the first of six appearances in the 2016–17 campaign.

== Personal life ==
Kabalin is the son of former professional footballer Mario Kabalín.

== Career statistics ==
As of 25 December 2018.

Club statistics
Club	Season	League			Cup (Note: Includes the Copa Argentina)		League Cup		Continental		Other		Total	
Club	Season	Division	Apps	Goals	Apps	Goals	Apps	Goals	Apps	Goals	Apps	Goals	Apps	Goals
Santamarina	2016–17	Primera B Nacional	6	0	1	0	—		—		0	0	7	0
Santamarina	2017–18	Primera B Nacional	10	0	0	0	—		—		0	0	10	0
Santamarina	2018–19	Primera B Nacional	6	0	0	0	—		—		0	0	6	0
Career total			22	0	1	0	—		—		0	0	23	0
