= Marcelo Guzmán =

Argentine footballer

Personal information
- Full name: Marcelo Enrique Guzmán
- Date of birth: 16 January 1985 (age 41)
- Place of birth: Córdoba, Argentina
- Height: 1.76 m (5 ft 9 1/2 in)
- Position: Midfielder

Senior career*
Years	Team	Apps	(Gls)
2004–2006	Racing de Córdoba	56	(1)
2006–2010	Quilmes	56	(1)
2010–2012	Patronato	65	(1)
2012–2013	Gimnasia y Esgrima	28	(0)
2013–2018	Patronato	121	(2)
2018–2019	Instituto	2	(0)
2019	Atlético de Rafaela	9	(0)
2019–2020	Santamarina	8	(0)
- * Club domestic league appearances and goals as of 22:17, 19 December 2019 (UTC)

Marcelo Enrique Guzmán (born 16 January 1985) is an Argentine professional footballer who plays as a midfielder.

== Career ==
Guzmán started his career with Racing de Córdoba. His professional debut was one of thirty-one appearances during the 2004–05 Primera B Nacional season, which ended with relegation to Torneo Argentino A. Twenty-five more appearances followed for Racing in 2005–06, before Guzmán was signed by Quilmes of the Argentine Primera División. However, he failed to feature in the 2006–07 season as Quilmes were relegated to Primera B Nacional. In June 2009, Guzmán scored his first Quilmes goal in a 0–2 win versus Aldosivi. June 2010 saw Guzmán completed a move to fellow Primera B Nacional team Patronato.

He remained with Patronato for two seasons, scoring once in sixty-seven matches, prior to having a spell with Gimnasia y Esgrima for the 2012–13 campaign. He made twenty-nine appearances for Gimnasia y Esgrima, receiving two red cards in the process as the club finished tenth. On 30 June 2013, Guzmán rejoined Patronato of Primera B Nacional. He made seventy-one appearances and scored two goals in his first three seasons back with Patronato, before making his Primera División debut for the club in February 2016 following promotion in December 2015. On 17 June 2018, Guzmán joined Instituto of the second tier.

Guzmán signed with Atlético de Rafaela in January 2019. His opening appearance came in a home loss to Villa Dálmine on 1 February.

== Career statistics ==
As of 3 February 2019.

Club statistics
Club	Season	League			Cup		Continental		Other		Total	
Club	Season	Division	Apps	Goals	Apps	Goals	Apps	Goals	Apps	Goals	Apps	Goals
Racing de Córdoba	2004–05	Primera B Nacional	31	1	0	0	—		0	0	31	1
Racing de Córdoba	2005–06	Torneo Argentino A	25	0	0	0	—		0	0	25	0
Racing de Córdoba	Total		56	1	0	0	—		0	0	56	1
Quilmes	2006–07	Primera División	0	0	0	0	—		0	0	0	0
Quilmes	2007–08	Primera B Nacional	19	0	0	0	—		0	0	19	0
Quilmes	2008–09	Primera B Nacional	22	1	0	0	—		0	0	22	1
Quilmes	2009–10	Primera B Nacional	15	0	0	0	—		0	0	15	0
Quilmes	Total		56	1	0	0	—		0	0	56	1
Patronato	2010–11	Primera B Nacional	33	1	0	0	—		0	0	33	1
Patronato	2011–12	Primera B Nacional	32	0	2	0	—		0	0	34	0
Patronato	Total		65	1	2	0	—		0	0	67	1
Gimnasia y Esgrima	2012–13	Primera B Nacional	28	0	1	0	—		0	0	29	0
Patronato	2013–14	Primera B Nacional	25	0	1	0	—		0	0	26	0
Patronato	2014	Primera B Nacional	16	1	0	0	—		0	0	16	1
Patronato	2015	Primera B Nacional	26	1	0	0	—		3 (Note: Appearance(s) in the Primera B Nacional play-offs)	0	29	1
Patronato	2016	Primera División	14	0	0	0	—		0	0	14	0
Patronato	2016–17	Primera División	23	0	2	0	—		0	0	25	0
Patronato	2017–18	Primera División	17	0	0	0	—		0	0	17	0
Patronato	Total		121	2	3	0	—		3	0	127	2
Instituto	2018–19	Primera B Nacional	2	0	0	0	—		0	0	2	0
Atlético de Rafaela	2018–19	Primera B Nacional	1	0	0	0	—		0	0	1	0
Career total			329	5	6	0	—		3	0	338	5
