= Roberto Tucker =

Argentine footballer

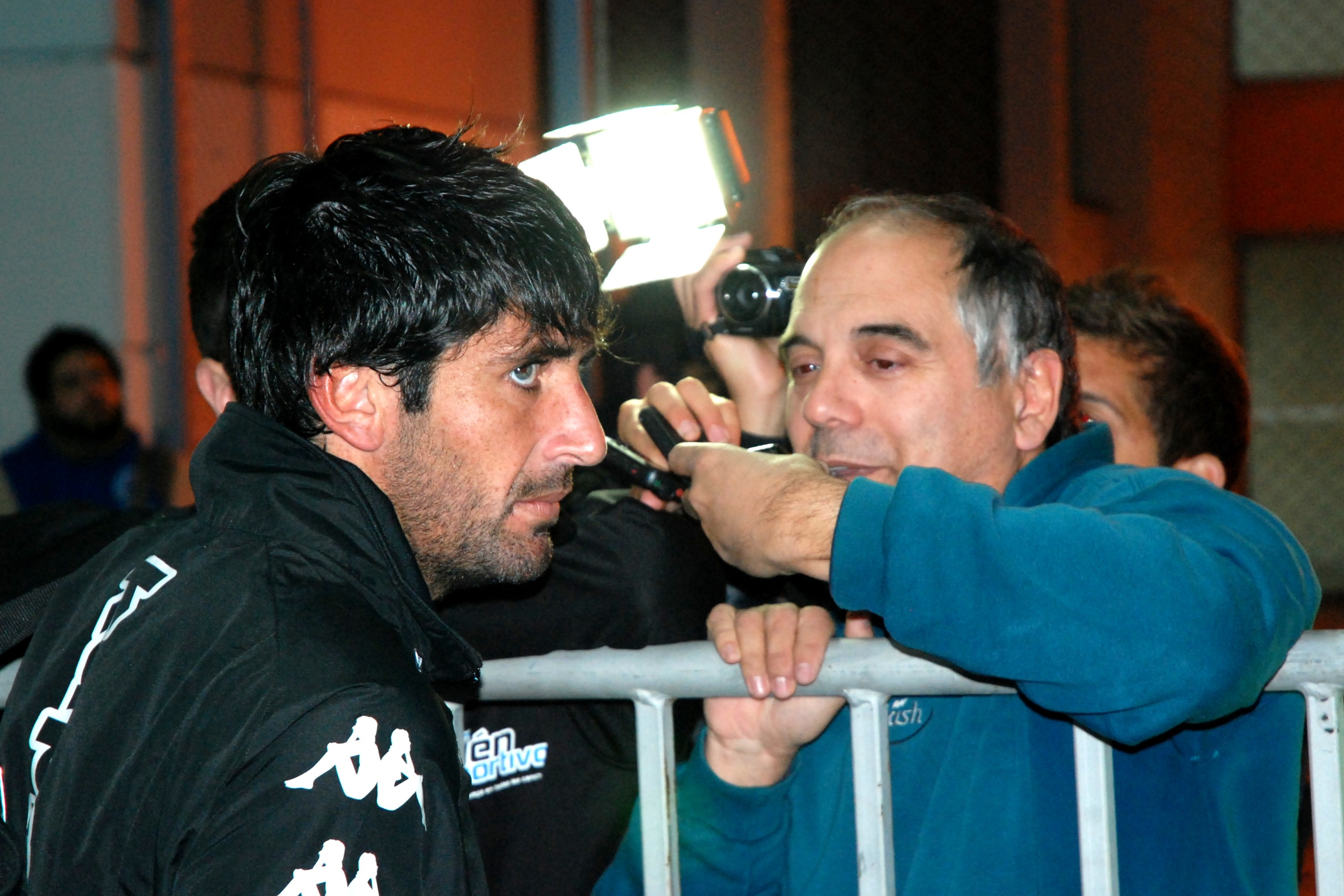

Personal information
- Full name: Roberto Tucker
- Date of birth: June 27, 1983 (age 43)
- Place of birth: Olavarría, Argentina
- Height: 1.83 m (6 ft 0 in)
- Position: Defender

Team information
- Current team: Racing de Olavarría

Youth career
- 2001–2003: El Fortín de Olavarría

Senior career*
Years	Team	Apps	(Gls)
2004–2008	Racing Club de Olavarría	-	(-)
2008–2009	Quilmes	31	(2)
2009–2010	Leixões	21	(0)
2010–2011	Deportivo Merlo	31	(1)
2011–2013	Sarmiento de Junín		
2013–2015	Caracas	48	(11)
2015	Santamarina	44	(3)
2016	Central Córdoba	20	(1)
2017	Deportivo La Guaira	20	(0)
2017–2018	Crucero del Norte	27	(4)
2018	Deportivo Madryn	14	(0)
2018–	Racing de Olavarría		
- * Club domestic league appearances and goals as of 23:45, 3 July 2019 (UTC)

Roberto Tucker (born June 27, 1983, in Olavarría) is an Argentine footballer who currently plays for Racing de Olavarría.

Tucker began his career playing for amateur side El Fortín de Olavarría in 2001. In 2004, he joined semi-professional side Racing Club de Olavarría of the regionalised 4th division. The club were promoted to the regionalised 3rd division in 2005 but descended again the following season.

In 2008, he turned fully pro, joining Quilmes of the 2nd division. In 2009, he joined Portuguese side Leixões S.C.
