= Adrián Scifo =

Argentine footballer

Personal information
- Full name: Adrián Miguel Scifo
- Date of birth: 10 October 1987 (age 39)
- Place of birth: Monte Caseros, Argentina
- Height: 1.80 m (5 ft 11 in)
- Position: Right-back

Senior career*
Years	Team	Apps	(Gls)
2008–2014	Nueva Chicago	183	(7)
2014–2015	Quilmes	34	(1)
2016	Unión Española	24	(1)
2017	Sarmiento	10	(1)
2017–2019	Temperley	17	(0)
2018–2019	Nueva Chicago	11	(0)
2019–2020	Santamarina	19	(0)
2020–2021	Fénix de Pilar	21	(2)
2021	Villa San Carlos	15	(0)
- * Club domestic league appearances and goals as of 20:15, 1 August 2022 (UTC)

Adrián Miguel Scifo (born 10 October 1987) is an Argentine footballer.
