= Mariano González =

Argentine footballer

Personal information
- Full name: Mariano Nicolás González
- Date of birth: 5 May 1981 (age 45)
- Place of birth: Tandil, Argentina
- Height: 1.74 m (5 ft 9 in)
- Positions: Midfielder; winger

Youth career
- Bambinos
- Independiente
- 1998–2001: Racing Club

Senior career*
Years	Team	Apps	(Gls)
2001–2004	Racing Club	64	(14)
2004–2008	Palermo	51	(4)
2006–2007	→ Inter Milan (loan)	14	(0)
2007–2008	→ Porto (loan)	21	(2)
2008–2011	Porto	52	(5)
2011–2014	Estudiantes	48	(2)
2013	→ Arsenal Sarandí (loan)	13	(0)
2014–2015	Santamarina	55	(8)
2016–2017	Huracán	44	(8)
2018–2019	Colón	18	(0)
2019–2022	Santamarina	73	(7)
Total		453	(50)

International career
2003–2008	Argentina	9	(1)

Managerial career
- 2022: Santamarina
Medal record
Representing Argentina
Men's Football
Gold medal – first place	2004 Athens	Team competition
- * Club domestic league appearances and goals

Mariano Nicolás González (born 5 May 1981) is an Argentine former professional footballer who played as an attacking midfielder or as a winger.

== Club career ==
Born in Tandil, Buenos Aires Province, González started his career at Racing Club de Avellaneda, arriving at 17 from neighbouring Club Atlético Independiente. He made his professional debut at 21 under legendary Osvaldo Ardiles, and went on to appear in 64 Primera División matches, notably scoring the 4–3 winner against Boca Juniors.

In 2004, González left for Italy, signing with Serie A side U.S. Città di Palermo and going on to feature regularly during two seasons, especially the second. For the 2006–07 campaign he was loaned to Inter Milan, where he failed to break into the starting lineup, barred by the likes of Luís Figo and Dejan Stanković. Later, Inter opted not to renew the loan deal, and Palermo subsequently accepted a similar request by FC Porto on 17 July 2007.

After Ricardo Quaresma's sale to precisely Inter, González was acquired on a permanent basis by the Portuguese, for €3.25 million, rejoining former Palermo teammate (and countryman) Ernesto Farías, and began to feature more prominently, notabling scoring in the last minute to level it 2–2 at Manchester United, for the 2008–09 UEFA Champions League quarter-finals, while also being an important part of the northerners' back-to-back Primeira Liga conquests (he also won the competition while on loan).

After 2010–11 finished, González was released by Porto and joined Estudiantes de La Plata on a free transfer.

== International career ==
González won his first cap and scored his only goal for Argentina against Honduras in 2003, under Marcelo Bielsa. The following year he was summoned for the Copa América as the nation finished second, and also played olympic football at the 2004 Summer Olympics, winning gold.

== Managerial career ==
On 1 April 2022 it was confirmed, that González had been appointed interim manager of Santamarina; the club he - at the time - already was playing for. González was - alongside his long-term friend Osvaldo Barsottini as his assistant - in charge for 12 games (five draws and seven losses), before he was replaced in June 2022.

== Personal life ==
González's younger brother, Pablo, was also a footballer. A striker, he too started his career at Racing Club, and spent several seasons in Italy.

== Honours ==
=== Club ===
Racing Club

- Argentine Primera División: 2001 Apertura

Inter

- Serie A: 2006–07

Porto

- Primeira Liga: 2007–08, 2008–09, 2010–11
- Taça de Portugal: 2008–09, 2009–10, 2010–11
- Supertaça Cândido de Oliveira: 2009
- UEFA Europa League: 2010–11

=== International ===
Argentina

- Summer Olympics: 2004
- Copa América runner-up: 2004
