= Lucas Sánchez (footballer, born 1997) =

Argentine footballer

Personal information
- Full name: Lucas Sánchez
- Date of birth: 12 December 1997 (age 28)
- Place of birth: Argentina
- Height: 1.79 m (5 ft 10 in)
- Position: Left-back

Team information
- Current team: Unión de Sunchales

Youth career
- Santamarina

Senior career*
Years	Team	Apps	(Gls)
2017–2021	Santamarina	10	(1)
2021	Circulo Deportivo	20	(1)
2022–	Unión de Sunchales	17	(1)
- * Club domestic league appearances and goals as of 20:08, 1 August 2022 (UTC)

Lucas Sánchez (born 12 December 1997) is an Argentine professional footballer who plays as a left-back for Unión de Sunchales.

== Career ==
Sánchez's career started with Santamarina. Héctor Arzubialde awarded Sánchez his professional bow during the 2017–18 Primera B Nacional campaign, with the defender being subbed on with ten minutes remaining of a draw with Flandria on 1 April 2018. In the following season, 2018–19, Sánchez started in their first seven league games, which culminated with his first career goal coming on 5 November versus Chacarita Juniors.

== Career statistics ==
As of 23 December 2018.

Club statistics
Club	Season	League			Cup (Note: Includes the Copa Argentina)		League Cup		Continental		Other		Total	
Club	Season	Division	Apps	Goals	Apps	Goals	Apps	Goals	Apps	Goals	Apps	Goals	Apps	Goals
Santamarina	2017–18	Primera B Nacional	1	0	0	0	—		—		0	0	1	0
Santamarina	2018–19	Primera B Nacional	8	1	0	0	—		—		0	0	8	1
Career total			9	1	0	0	—		—		0	0	9	1
