= Enzo Lamarche =

Argentine footballer

Personal information
- Date of birth: 18 September 1997 (age 29)
- Place of birth: Rauch, Argentina
- Position: Forward

Team information
- Current team: Defensores Ayacucho
- Number: 17

Youth career
- Tigre

Senior career*
Years	Team	Apps	(Gls)
2017–2018	Santamarina	6	(0)
2019	Botafogo Rauch		
2020–2022	Deportivo Rauch		
2023–	Defensores Ayacucho		
- * Club domestic league appearances and goals

Enzo Lamarche (born 18 September 1997) is an Argentine professional footballer who plays as a forward for Defensores Ayacucho.

== Career ==
Lamarche began in Santamarina's youth. He was moved into their first-team during the 2017–18 Primera B Nacional campaign, making his professional debut on 11 December 2017 during a defeat to Deportivo Riestra at the Estadio Eduardo Gallardón. He subsequently featured five more times for them in 2017–18 as they finished twenty-fifth. Lamarche left Santamarina in 2018, subsequently having spells with hometown clubs Botafogo Rauch and Deportivo Rauch in Liga Rauchense.

Ahead of the 2023 season, Lamarche joined Defensores de Ayacucho. As of August 2024, he was still playing for the club.

== Career statistics ==
As of 14 July 2020.

Club statistics
Club	Season	League			Cup		League Cup		Continental		Other		Total	
Club	Season	Division	Apps	Goals	Apps	Goals	Apps	Goals	Apps	Goals	Apps	Goals	Apps	Goals
Santamarina	2017–18	Primera B Nacional	6	0	0	0	—		—		0	0	6	0
Career total			6	0	0	0	—		—		0	0	6	0
