= Maximiliano Osurak =

Argentine footballer (born 1991)

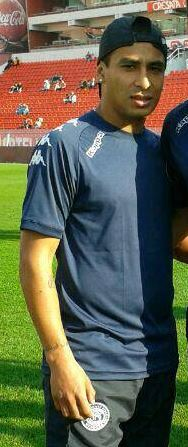

Personal information
- Full name: Maximiliano José Osurak
- Date of birth: 23 October 1991 (age 35)
- Place of birth: Santa Fe, Argentina
- Position: Forward

Team information
- Current team: Boca Unidos

Youth career
- Colón de San Justo

Senior career*
Years	Team	Apps	(Gls)
2013–2014	Independiente Rivadavia	4	(0)
2014	Deportivo Guaymallén	12	(1)
2015	Colón de San Justo		
2015	9 de Julio	22	(5)
2016	Belgrano		
2016	San Jorge	12	(2)
2017	Platense	14	(3)
2017	Belgrano	23	(12)
2018	Atlético Paraná	17	(8)
2018–2020	Santamarina	22	(3)
2020	Pannafpliakos		
2021	Chaco For Ever	8	(0)
2022	Sportivo Peñarol	11	(2)
2022	Sol de Mayo	19	(5)
2023	Sol de América Formosa	29	(11)
2024	Olimpo	20	(2)
2024	Zacapa	10	(1)
2025–	Boca Unidos	24	(7)
- * Club domestic league appearances and goals as of 17:23, 30 March 2026 (UTC)

Maximiliano José Osurak (born 23 October 1991) is an Argentine professional footballer who plays as a forward for Boca Unidos.

== Career ==
Independiente Rivadavia signed Osurak from Colón de San Justo. He featured four times throughout the 2013–14 Primera B Nacional campaign, including for his professional debut on 4 August 2013 against Sportivo Belgrano. January 2015 saw the forward join Deportivo Guaymallén, with twelve appearances and one goal following in Torneo Federal B. Moves to Colón de San Justo, an ex-club, and 9 de Julio followed in 2015, before Osurak joined Belgrano in early 2016. On 30 June 2016, Osurak was signed by Torneo Federal A's San Jorge. He netted goals against Juventud Antoniana and Concepción during 2016.

In January 2017, Osurak switched Argentina for Honduras by joining Liga Nacional side Platense. He made his bow for the club on 29 January versus Social Sol, scoring his first goal in the process as Platense won 2–1. In total, Osurak participated in fourteen fixtures and scored three for the Honduran club. He subsequently rejoined Belgrano in mid-2017, prior to moving to Atlético Paraná on 1 January 2018. After four goals in nine games for them, Santamarina of Primera B Nacional signed Osurak.

== Career statistics ==
As of 28 December 2018.

Club statistics
Club	Season	League			Cup		Continental		Other		Total	
Club	Season	Division	Apps	Goals	Apps	Goals	Apps	Goals	Apps	Goals	Apps	Goals
Independiente Rivadavia	2013–14	Primera B Nacional	4	0	0	0	—		0	0	4	0
Deportivo Guaymallén	2014	Torneo Federal B	12	1	0	0	—		0	0	12	1
9 de Julio	2015	Torneo Federal B	22	5	0	0	—		0	0	22	5
San Jorge	2016	Torneo Federal A	12	2	0	0	—		0	0	12	2
Platense	2016–17	Liga Nacional	14	3	0	0	—		0	0	14	3
Belgrano	2017	Torneo Federal B	23	12	0	0	—		0	0	23	12
Atlético Paraná	2017–18	Torneo Federal A	8	4	0	0	—		1 (Note: Appearance(s) in the Torneo Federal A play-offs)	0	9	4
Santamarina	2018–19	Primera B Nacional	11	1	0	0	—		0	0	11	1
Career total			106	28	0	0	—		1	0	107	28
