= Agustín Guiffrey =

Argentine association football player

Personal information
- Date of birth: 3 November 1997 (age 29)
- Place of birth: San Cipriano, Argentina
- Height: 1.76 m (5 ft 9 in)
- Position: Midfielder

Team information
- Current team: Gimnasia Concepción

Youth career
- DEPRO
- Las Achiras
- 2016–2018: Patronato

Senior career*
Years	Team	Apps	(Gls)
2018–2021	Patronato	8	(0)
2019–2020	→ Santamarina (loan)	7	(0)
2021	DEPRO	21	(3)
2022	Deportivo Camioneros	7	(1)
2022	Los Andes	6	(0)
2022	Belgrano Rosario		
2023–	Gimnasia Concepción	10	(1)
- * Club domestic league appearances and goals as of 18:44, 28 May 2023 (UTC)

Agustín Guiffrey (born 3 November 1997) is an Argentine professional footballer who plays as a midfielder for Gimnasia Concepción.

== Career ==
Guiffrey played for Defensores de Pronunciamiento and Las Achiras at youth level, prior to joining Patronato in 2016. He was moved into the senior squad of Patronato midway through the 2017–18 campaign, with the midfielder making his debut for the Argentine Primera División side on 19 February 2018 during a 3–0 victory over Chacarita Juniors; having been an unused substitute a week before against Vélez Sarsfield. Guiffrey appeared five further times for Patronato in his maiden season, as Patronato finished in nineteenth place. He was loaned to Santamarina in July 2019.

== Career statistics ==
As of 23 June 2020.

Club statistics
Club	Season	League			Cup		League Cup		Continental		Other		Total	
Club	Season	Division	Apps	Goals	Apps	Goals	Apps	Goals	Apps	Goals	Apps	Goals	Apps	Goals
Patronato	2017–18	Primera División	6	0	0	0	—		—		0	0	6	0
Patronato	2018–19	Primera División	1	0	0	0	0	0	—		0	0	1	0
Patronato	2019–20	Primera División	0	0	0	0	0	0	—		0	0	0	0
Patronato	Total		7	0	0	0	0	0	—		0	0	7	0
Santamarina (loan)	2019–20	Primera B Nacional	7	0	0	0	—		—		0	0	7	0
Career total			14	0	0	0	0	0	—		0	0	14	0
