= Luca Orozco =

Argentine footballer

Personal information
- Full name: Luca Ezequiel Orozco
- Date of birth: 15 April 1995 (age 31)
- Place of birth: Bahía Blanca, Argentina
- Height: 1.88 m (6 ft 2 in)
- Position: Centre-back

Team information
- Current team: Isidro Metapán
- Number: 4

Senior career*
Years	Team	Apps	(Gls)
2014–2019	Olimpo	18	(1)
2016–2017	→ Guillermo Brown (loan)	0	(0)
2019–2020	Santamarina	1	(0)
2020–2021	Quebracho		
2021	Deportivo Villalonga	6	(0)
2022–	Isidro Metapán	2	(0)
- * Club domestic league appearances and goals as of 20:05, 1 August 2022 (UTC)

Luca Ezequiel Orozco (born 15 April 1995) is an Argentine professional footballer who plays as a centre-back for Salvadorian club Isidro Metapán.

== Career ==
Orozco began with Olimpo. He started featuring in the first-team squad set-up from the 2014 Primera División campaign, but didn't make a competitive appearance in any of the next two seasons; though was an unused substitute six times in all competitions. On 7 July 2016, Orozco was loaned to Guillermo Brown of Primera B Nacional. Despite remaining for the entirety of 2016–17, he wasn't selected and appeared on the bench just once; versus Flandria on 11 September. Back with Olimpo in 2017, Orozco's professional debut eventually came in 2018 against Atlético Tucumán. He played once more as they were relegated.

Orozco saw more regular action in 2018–19 in Primera B Nacional, participating in ten of the club's twelve league matches in the first half of the season. Orozco scored his first senior goal during a 1–0 victory over Agropecuario on 3 February 2019.

== Career statistics ==
As of 2 March 2019.

Appearances and goals by club, season and competition
Club	Season	League			Cup		Continental		Other		Total	
Club	Season	Division	Apps	Goals	Apps	Goals	Apps	Goals	Apps	Goals	Apps	Goals
Olimpo	2014	Primera División	0	0	0	0	—		0	0	0	0
Olimpo	2015	Primera División	0	0	0	0	—		0	0	0	0
Olimpo	2016	Primera División	0	0	0	0	—		0	0	0	0
Olimpo	2016–17	Primera División	0	0	0	0	—		0	0	0	0
Olimpo	2017–18	Primera División	2	0	0	0	—		0	0	2	0
Olimpo	2018–19	Primera B Nacional	14	1	2	0	—		0	0	16	1
Olimpo	Total		16	1	2	0	—		0	0	18	1
Guillermo Brown (loan)	2016–17	Primera B Nacional	0	0	0	0	—		0	0	0	0
Career total			16	1	2	0	—		0	0	18	1
