= Braian Maidana =

Argentine professional footballer

Personal information
- Full name: Braian Ezequiel Maidana Talavera
- Date of birth: 22 July 1999 (age 27)
- Place of birth: Isidro Casanova, Argentina
- Height: 1.65 m (5 ft 5 in)
- Position: Winger

Team information
- Current team: Juventud Unida (San Miguel)

Youth career
- 2018–2020: Huracán

Senior career*
Years	Team	Apps	(Gls)
2020–2023	Huracán		
2021–2022	→ Santamarina (loan)		
2023	→ Tristán Suárez (loan)		
2024–	Juventud Unida (San Miguel)		
- * Club domestic league appearances and goals as of 20:34, 23 April 2024 (UTC)

Braian Ezequiel Maidana Talavera (born 22 July 1999) is an Argentine professional footballer who plays as a winger for Juventud Unida of San Miguel, Argentina.

== Career ==
Maidana is a product of the Huracán youth system. He signed his first professional contract in November 2017. Maidana was promoted into interim manager Néstor Apuzzo's first-team squad in December 2019 for a Primera División encounter with Arsenal de Sarandí, with the winger subsequently making his senior debut during a 2–0 home defeat; he replaced Agustín Curruhinca with nine minutes remaining at the Estadio Tomás Adolfo Ducó. In February 2020, he renewed his contract until June 2023. His second appearance arrived in the Copa de la Liga Profesional on 10 January 2021, again against Arsenal; in an away loss.

At the end of July 2021, Maidana joined Primera Nacional club Deportivo Santamarina on loan until the end of 2022.

== Career statistics ==
As of 11 January 2021.

Appearances and goals by club, season and competition
Club	Season	League			Cup		League Cup		Continental		Other		Total	
Club	Season	Division	Apps	Goals	Apps	Goals	Apps	Goals	Apps	Goals	Apps	Goals	Apps	Goals
Huracán	2019–20	Primera División	1	0	0	0	0	0	0	0	0	0	1	0
Huracán	2020–21 (Note: Soccerway counts Copa de la Liga Profesional appearances as league appearances.)	Primera División	3	0	0	0	0	0	—		0	0	1	0
Career total			4	0	0	0	0	0	0	0	0	0	2	0
