= Federico Paulucci =

Argentine footballer

Personal information
- Full name: Federico Paulucci Tinnirello
- Date of birth: 11 January 1990 (age 36)
- Place of birth: Firmat, Argentina
- Height: 1.92 m (6 ft 4 in)
- Position: Defender

Youth career
- 2008–2009: Udinese

Senior career*
Years	Team	Apps	(Gls)
2007	Firmat FBC	–	(–)
2008–2009	Udinese	0	(0)
2010–2011	Universidad de Concepción	0	(0)
2011	San Luis	12	(2)
2012–2014	Santiago Morning	35	(2)
2014–2015	Ferro General Pico	35	(1)
2016–2017	Atlético Paraná	29	(0)
2017–2018	Alvarado	27	(1)
2018–2019	Santamarina	10	(0)
2019–2020	Ferro General Pico	11	(0)
- * Club domestic league appearances and goals

Federico Paulucci Tinnirello (born 11 January 1990) is an Argentine former professional footballer who played as a defender.

== Teams ==
- (Argentina) Firmat FBC 2007
- (Italy) Udinese 2008–2009
- (Chile) Universidad de Concepción 2010–2011
- (Chile) San Luis de Quillota 2011
- (Chile) Santiago Morning 2011–2014
- (Argentina) Ferro Carril Oeste (General Pico) 2014–2015
- (Argentina) Atlético Paraná 2016–2017
- (Argentina) Alvarado 2017–2018
- (Argentina) Santamarina 2018–2019
- (Argentina) Ferro Carril Oeste (General Pico) 2019–2020
