= Tomás Casas =

Argentine footballer

Personal information
- Full name: Tomás Agustín Casas
- Date of birth: 27 September 1996 (age 30)
- Place of birth: Tandil, Argentina
- Height: 1.83 m (6 ft 0 in)
- Position: Goalkeeper

Team information
- Current team: Circulo Deportivo

Youth career
- Santamarina
- → Defensa y Justicia (loan)

Senior career*
| Years | Team | Apps | (Gls) |
| 2016–2021 | Santamarina | 14 | (0) |
| 2021–2022 | Los Andes | 7 | (0) |
| 2022– | Santamarina | 7 | (0) |
- * Club domestic league appearances and goals as of 19:45, 1 August 2022 (UTC)

Tomás Agustín Casas (born 27 September 1996) is an Argentine professional footballer who plays as a goalkeeper for Circulo Deportivo.

== Career ==
Casas spent the majority of his youth career with Santamarina, though he did also have a loan spell with Defensa y Justicia. He was an unused substitute ten times for Santamarina in 2016, making his professional debut on the tenth occasion after coming off the bench following Emiliano Olivero's red card in a draw away to Atlético Paraná on 16 April. He featured once more that season, with Santamarina ending the campaign thirteenth.

== Career statistics ==
As of 22 December 2018.

Club statistics
| Club | Season | League | | | Cup (Note: Includes the Copa Argentina) | | League Cup | | Continental | | Other | | Total | |
| Club | Season | Division | Apps | Goals | Apps | Goals | Apps | Goals | Apps | Goals | Apps | Goals | Apps | Goals |
|---|---|---|---|---|---|---|---|---|---|---|---|---|---|---|
| Santamarina | 2016 | Primera B Nacional | 2 | 0 | 0 | 0 | — | | — | | 0 | 0 | 2 | 0 |
| Santamarina | 2016–17 | Primera B Nacional | 3 | 0 | 0 | 0 | — | | — | | 0 | 0 | 3 | 0 |
| Santamarina | 2017–18 | Primera B Nacional | 0 | 0 | 0 | 0 | — | | — | | 0 | 0 | 0 | 0 |
| Santamarina | 2018–19 | Primera B Nacional | 2 | 0 | 0 | 0 | — | | — | | 0 | 0 | 0 | 0 |
| Career total | | | 7 | 0 | 0 | 0 | — | | — | | 0 | 0 | 5 | 0 |
