= Osvaldo Barsottini =

Argentine footballer

Personal information
- Full name: Osvaldo Rubén Barsottini
- Date of birth: 28 August 1979 (age 47)
- Place of birth: Tandil, Argentina
- Height: 1.85 m (6 ft 1 in)
- Position: Centre-back

Youth career
- Racing Club

Senior career*
Years	Team	Apps	(Gls)
2000–2003	Racing Club	1	(0)
2003–2004	Godoy Cruz	29	(0)
2004–2005	Defensores Belgrano	30	(1)
2005	El Porvenir	9	(0)
2004–2005	San Martín de Mendoza	23	(2)
2006–2007	Platense	52	(2)
2008	Unión Española	12	(0)
2008–2009	Indep. Rivadavia	31	(0)
2009–2012	Instituto de Córdoba	79	(6)
2012–2016	Gimnasia LP	110	(12)
2016	Colón	4	(1)
2017–2018	Ferro Carril Oeste	35	(1)
2018–2022	Santamarina	78	(5)

Managerial career
- 2022: Santamarina (assistant)
- * Club domestic league appearances and goals

Osvaldo Barsottini (born 28 August 1979) is an Argentine footballer, who plays as a centre-back.

He has formerly played for clubs like Unión Española, Gimnasia de La Plata and CA Colón.

== Teams ==
=== Player ===
Racing Club

- Argentine Primera División (1): 2001 Clausura
