= Esteban Pipino =

Argentine footballer

Personal information
- Full name: Esteban Javier Pipino
- Date of birth: 19 April 1990 (age 36)
- Place of birth: Tigre, Argentina
- Height: 1.80 m (5 ft 11 in)
- Position: Midfielder

Team information
- Current team: Deportes Copiapó
- Number: 19

Youth career
- Tigre

Senior career*
Years	Team	Apps	(Gls)
2011–2013	Fénix	32	(3)
2013–2014	SV Eltendorf	37	(16)
2015	Atlético Pilar Obrero	19	(2)
2016–2019	Acassuso	115	(23)
2019	Deportivo Riestra	10	(1)
2020–	Deportes Copiapó	7	(0)
- * Club domestic league appearances and goals as of 00:36, 30 October 2020 (UTC)

Esteban Javier Pipino (born 19 April 1990) is an Argentine professional footballer who plays as a midfielder for Deportes Copiapó.

== Career ==
Pipino began with Tigre's youth, before joining Fénix. He featured in thirteen fixtures and netted three goals in 2011–12, as the club won promotion from Primera D Metropolitana to Primera C Metropolitana. A further nineteen appearances came in 2012–13 as they secured a second successive promotion to Primera B Metropolitana. In 2013, Pipino moved to Austrian football with fifth tier SV Eltendorf. He'd score sixteen goals in thirty-seven fixtures in 2. Liga Süd; whilst netting nine in five for their reserves. His final goal came on 14 June 2014 versus USV Rudersdorf, which preceded a departure in November after contract issues.

Pipino, in 2015, played for Torneo Federal B outfit Atlético Pilar Obrero. 2016 saw Pipino completed a move to Acassuso. His opening goal came in a win away to Deportivo Español in May, before he scored sixteen times in three seasons; which included a hat-trick over Platense on 17 February 2018. On 9 June 2019, Pipino agreed terms with newly promoted Primera B Nacional team Deportivo Riestra. Six months later, Pipino headed to Chile with Deportes Copiapó.

== Career statistics ==
As of 16 July 2020.

Appearances and goals by club, season and competition
Club	Season	League			Cup		League Cup		Continental		Other		Total	
Club	Season	Division	Apps	Goals	Apps	Goals	Apps	Goals	Apps	Goals	Apps	Goals	Apps	Goals
Fénix	2011–12	Primera D Metropolitana	13	3	0	0	—		—		0	0	13	3
Fénix	2012–13	Primera C Metropolitana	19	0	0	0	—		—		0	0	19	0
Fénix	Total		32	3	0	0	—		—		0	0	32	3
Atlético Pilar Obrero	2015	Torneo Federal B	19	2	0	0	—		—		0	0	19	2
Acassuso	2016	Primera B Metropolitana	11	2	0	0	—		—		0	0	11	2
Acassuso	2016–17	Primera B Metropolitana	32	5	0	0	—		—		0	0	32	5
Acassuso	2017–18	Primera B Metropolitana	33	9	0	0	—		—		1 (Note: Appearance(s) in the Primera B Metropolitana play-offs)	0	34	9
Acassuso	2018–19	Primera B Metropolitana	39	7	0	0	—		—		0	0	39	7
Acassuso	Total		115	23	0	0	—		—		1	0	116	23
Deportivo Riestra	2019–20	Primera B Nacional	10	1	0	0	—		—		0	0	10	1
Deportes Copiapó	2019	Primera B	0	0	0	0	—		—		2 (Note: Appearance(s) in the Primera B play-offs)	0	2	0
Deportes Copiapó	2020	Primera B	3	0	0	0	—		—		0	0	3	0
Deportes Copiapó	Total		3	0	0	0	—		—		2	0	5	0
Career total			179	29	0	0	—		—		3	0	182	29
