= Tomás Pérez Serra =

Argentine footballer (born 1998)

Personal information
- Date of birth: 13 November 1998 (age 27)
- Place of birth: Argentina
- Position: Defender

Team information
- Current team: Chacarita Juniors

Senior career*
Years	Team	Apps	(Gls)
2018–2022	Deportivo Español	80	(6)
2022	Santamarina	14	(0)
2023–2026	Tristán Suárez	58	(1)
2024	→ Tilikratis (loan)	7	(0)
2026–	Chacarita Juniors	4	(0)
- * Club domestic league appearances and goals as of 17:59, 1 April 2026 (UTC)

Tomás Pérez Serra (born 13 November 1998) is an Argentine professional footballer who plays as a defender for Chacarita Juniors.

== Career ==
Pérez Serra's senior career got underway with Deportivo Español. He scored on his professional debut on 18 April 2018, netting in a 1–0 win over UAI Urquiza in Primera B Metropolitana. One further appearance followed in 2017–18, prior to another twenty-four arriving in 2018–19 as Deportivo Español were relegated. In June 2022, Pérez Serra joined Primera Nacional side Santamarina.

== Career statistics ==
As of 24 May 2019.

Appearances and goals by club, season and competition
Club	Season	League			Cup		League Cup		Continental		Other		Total	
Club	Season	Division	Apps	Goals	Apps	Goals	Apps	Goals	Apps	Goals	Apps	Goals	Apps	Goals
Deportivo Español	2017–18	Primera B Metropolitana	2	1	0	0	—		—		0	0	2	1
Deportivo Español	2018–19	Primera B Metropolitana	24	0	0	0	—		—		0	0	24	0
Career total			26	1	0	0	—		—		0	0	26	1
