= Matías Gutiérrez (Argentine footballer) =

Argentine footballer

Personal information
- Full name: Matías Ramón Gutiérrez Raffault
- Date of birth: 4 March 1994 (age 32)
- Place of birth: Buenos Aires, Argentina
- Position: Midfielder

Youth career
- Boca Unidos

Senior career*
Years	Team	Apps	(Gls)
- Independiente (T)
2017	Independiente (SC)	19	(0)
2018	Ferrocarril Sud		
2018–2019	Santamarina	1	(0)
- * Club domestic league appearances and goals as of 21:38, 9 June 2020 (UTC)

Matías Ramón Gutiérrez Raffault (born 4 March 1994) is an Argentine professional footballer who plays as a midfielder.

== Career ==
Gutiérrez played for Boca Unidos at youth level, prior to beginning his senior career with local team Independiente (T). In 2017, he joined San Cayetano namesakes Independiente of Torneo Federal B. Nineteen appearances followed across that year's campaign. On 7 March 2018, Gutiérrez signed for Ferrocarril Sud. Five months later, in August, Gutiérrez joined Primera B Nacional side Santamarina after a successful trial. His professional debut subsequently came on 26 November during a 0–0 draw with Independiente Rivadavia.

== Career statistics ==
As of 25 December 2018.

Club statistics
Club	Season	League			Cup (Note: Includes the Copa Argentina)		League Cup		Continental		Other		Total	
Club	Season	Division	Apps	Goals	Apps	Goals	Apps	Goals	Apps	Goals	Apps	Goals	Apps	Goals
Independiente (SC)	2017	Torneo Federal B	19	0	0	0	—		—		0	0	19	0
Santamarina	2018–19	Primera B Nacional	1	0	0	0	—		—		0	0	1	0
Career total			20	0	0	0	—		—		0	0	20	0
