= 2013–14 in Argentine football =

Football in Argentina
- Season: 2013–14

Men's football
- Primera División: San Lorenzo (Torneo inícial)
- Supercopa Argentina: Vélez Sarsfield

2013–14 season of Argentine football is the 123rd season of competitive football in Argentina.

== National teams ==
=== Men's ===
This section covers Argentina men's matches from August 1, 2013, to July 31, 2014.

==== Friendlies ====
Win Draw Loss

August 14, 2013	Italy	1 – 2	Argentina	Rome, Italy
19:45 CEST	Insigne 75'	Report	Higuaín 21'; Banega 49'; Campagnaro (yellow card) 74'	Stadium: Stadio Olimpico; Attendance: 35,000; Referee: W. Stark (German)

November 15, 2013	Ecuador	0 – 0	Argentina	East Rutherford, United States
	J. Ayoví (yellow card) 81'; W. Ayoví (yellow card) 85'; Gaibor (yellow card) 90'	Report	Roncaglia (yellow card) 32'	Stadium: MetLife Stadium; Referee: Silviu Petrescu (Canada)

November 18, 2013	Argentina	2 – 0	Bosnia and Herzegovina	St. Louis, United States
	Agüero 39', 65'	Report		Stadium: Busch Stadium; Referee: Edvin Jurisevic (United States)

March 5, 2014	Romania	0 – 0	Argentina	Bucharest, Romania
		Report		Stadium: Arena Națională; Referee: Gianluca Rocchi (Italy)

June 4, 2014	Argentina	3 – 0	Trinidad and Tobago	Buenos Aires, Argentina
	Palacio 45'; Mascherano 51'; M. Rodríguez 64'	Report		Stadium: Estadio Monumental Antonio Vespucio Liberti; Attendance: 40,000; Referee: Daniel Fedorczuk (Uruguay)

June 7, 2014	Argentina	2 – 0	Slovenia	La Plata, Argentina
	Álvarez 12'; Messi 76'	Report		Stadium: Estadio Ciudad de La Plata; Attendance: 53,000; Referee: Martín Vázquez (Uruguay)

==== 2014 World Cup qualifiers ====
Win Draw Loss

September 10, 2013 Round 16	Paraguay	2 – 5	Argentina	Asunción, Paraguay
	Núñez 17'; Santa Cruz 86'	Report	Messi 12' (pen.), 53' (pen.); Agüero 32'; Di María 50'; M. Rodríguez 90'	Stadium: Asunción, Estadio Defensores del Chaco; Referee: Enrique Osses (Chile)

October 11, 2013 Round 17	Argentina	3 – 1	Peru	Buenos Aires, Argentina
	Lavezzi 23', 35'; Palacio 47'	Report	Pizarro 21'	Stadium: Buenos Aires, Estadio Monumental Antonio Vespucio Liberti; Referee: Carlos Vera (Ecuador)

October 15, 2013 Round 18	Uruguay	3 – 2	Argentina	Montevideo, Uruguay
01:30	C. Rodríguez 6'; Suárez 34' (pen.); Cavani 49'		M. Rodríguez 14', 41'	Stadium: Montevideo, Estadio Centenario; Referee: Marcelo Henrique (Brazil)

==== 2014 FIFA World Cup ====
June 15, 2014 Group Stage	Argentina	2 – 1	Bosnia and Herzegovina	Rio de Janeiro, Brazil
19:00 UTC-3	Kolašinac 3' (o.g.); Messi 65'	Report	Ibišević 85'	Stadium: Estádio do Maracanã; Attendance: 74,738; Referee: Joel Aguilar (El Salvador)

June 21, 2014 Group Stage	Argentina	1 − 0	Iran	Belo Horizonte, Brazil
13:00 UTC-3	Messi 90+1'	Report		Stadium: Estádio Mineirão; Attendance: 57,698; Referee: Milorad Mažić (Serbia)

June 25, 2014 Group Stage	Nigeria	2 − 3	Argentina	Porto Alegre, Brazil
13:00 UTC-3	Musa 4', 47'	Report	Messi 3', 45+1'; Rojo 50'	Stadium: Estádio Beira-Rio; Attendance: 43,285; Referee: Nicola Rizzoli (Italy)

July 1, 2014 Round of 16	Argentina	1 − 0	Switzerland	São Paulo, Brazil
13:00 UTC-3	Di María 118'	Report		Stadium: Arena de São Paulo; Attendance: 63,255; Referee: Jonas Eriksson (Sweden)

July 5, 2014 Quarterfinals	Argentina	1 – 0	Belgium	Brasília, Brazil
13:00 UTC-3	Higuaín 8'	Report		Stadium: Estádio Nacional Mané Garrincha; Attendance: 68,551; Referee: Nicola Rizzoli (Italy)

July 9, 2014 Semifinals	Netherlands	0 – 0 (a.e.t.) (2 – 4 p)	Argentina	São Paulo, Brazil
17:00 UTC-3		Report		Stadium: Arena de São Paulo; Attendance: 61,606; Referee: Cüneyt Çakır (Turkey)
	Penalties
	Vlaar (penalty missed); Robben (penalty scored); Sneijder (penalty missed); Kuyt (penalty scored)		(penalty scored) Messi; (penalty scored) Garay; (penalty scored) Agüero; (penalty scored) M. Rodríguez

July 13, 2014 Final	Germany	1 – 0	Argentina	Rio de Janeiro, Brazil
16:00 UTC-3	Götze 113'	Report		Stadium: Estádio do Maracanã; Attendance: 74,738; Referee: Nicola Rizzoli (Italy)
