= Grupo Universitario de Tandil =

Argentine football club

Grupo Universitario
- Full name: Grupo Universitario de Tandil
- Nickname(s): El Grupo
- Founded: February 26, 1984
- Ground: Estadio Municipal General San Martín, Tandil; Buenos Aires Province, Argentina
- League: Torneo Argentino B
- 2010–11: 32nd
| Home colours | Away colours |

Grupo Universitario is an Argentine football club from the city of Tandil, Buenos Aires Province. The team currently plays in the torneo Argentino B, the regionalised 4th level of the Argentine football league system

== See also ==
- List of football clubs in Argentina
- Argentine football league system
