= 2015 Primera B Nacional =

30th season of the second-tier football league in Argentina

Primera B Nacional
- Season: 2015
- Champions: Atlético Tucumán
- Promoted: Atlético Tucumán; Patronato
- Relegated: Gimnasia y Esgrima (M); Guaraní Antonio Franco; Sportivo Belgrano; Unión (MdP)
- Matches: 462
- Goals: 974 (2.11 per match)
- Top goalscorer: Fernando Zampedri (25 goals)
- Biggest home win: Juventud Unida (G) 5-0 Gimnasia y Esgrima (M) (29 March); Atletico Tucumán (G) 5-0 Los Andes (M) (8 November)
- Biggest away win: Gimnasia y Esgrima (J) 1-4 Juventud Unida (G) (8 July); Ramón Santamarina 1-4 Guillermo Brown (22 August); Douglas Haig 1-4 Atlético Tucumán (27 September)
- Highest scoring: Patronato 6-2 Chacarita Juniors (11 November)
- All statistics correct as of 18 November 2015.

The 2015 Argentine Primera B Nacional season was the 30th season of Argentine second division, with a total of 22 competing teams. It began 14 February and ended 14 November 2015. Although there was some use of a different name earlier in the year, the AFA has consistently used the Primera B Nacional moniker in releases of late.

== Competition format ==
The league's format has changed from last season. This year there will be twenty-two teams which will play each other twice for a total of forty-two matches.

In November 2014, the AFA announced two teams from this season will be promoted to the Primera División. It was later reported that the champion will be promoted directly and positions 2-5 will compete in the "Torneo Reducido" for the second place after the regular season. At the end of the season, four teams will be relegated.

== Club information ==
Club	City	Stadium
All Boys	Buenos Aires	Islas Malvinas
Atlético Paraná	Paraná	Pedro Mutio
Atlético Tucumán	Tucumán	Monumental José Fierro
Boca Unidos	Corrientes	José Antonio Romero Feris
Central Córdoba	Santiago del Estero	Alfredo Terrera
Chacarita Juniors	Villa Maipú	Chacarita Juniors Stadium
Douglas Haig	Pergamino	Miguel Morales
Estudiantes	San Luis	Héctor Odicino-Pedro Benoza
Ferro Carril Oeste	Buenos Aires	Arquitecto Ricardo Etcheverry
Guillermo Brown	Puerto Madryn	Raúl Conti
Gimnasia y Esgrima	Mendoza	Víctor Legrotaglie
Gimnasia y Esgrima	Jujuy	23 de Agosto
Guaraní Antonio Franco	Posadas	Clemente Fernandez de Oliveira
Independiente Rivadavia	Mendoza	Bautista Gargantini
Instituto	Córdoba	Presidente Perón
Juventud Unida	Gualeguaychú	Estadio Luis Delfino
Los Andes	Lomas de Zamora	Estadio Eduardo Gallardón
Patronato	Paraná	Presbítero Bartolomé Grella
Santamarina	Tandil	Municipal Gral. San Martín
Sportivo Belgrano	San Francisco	Oscar Boero
Unión	Mar del Plata	José María Minella
Villa Dálmine	Campana	Villa Dálmine

== League table ==
Pos	Team	Pld	W	D	L	GF	GA	GD	Pts	Promotion or Qualification
1	Atlético Tucumán (C, P)	42	24	13	5	69	31	+38	85	Promotion to Primera División and Qualification to 2015–16 Copa Argentina
2	Patronato (O, P)	42	23	13	6	60	24	+36	82	Qualification for Torneo Reducido and Qualification to 2015–16 Copa Argentina
3	Ferro Carril Oeste	42	18	13	11	44	37	+7	67	Qualification for Torneo Reducido and Qualification to 2015–16 Copa Argentina
4	Santamarina	42	18	12	12	54	40	+14	66	Qualification for Torneo Reducido and Qualification to 2015–16 Copa Argentina
5	Instituto	42	15	17	10	48	38	+10	62	Qualification for Torneo Reducido and Qualification to 2015–16 Copa Argentina
6	Villa Dálmine	42	15	15	12	44	42	+2	60	Qualification for 2015–16 Copa Argentina
7	Atlético Paraná	42	16	10	16	50	46	+4	58	Qualification for 2015–16 Copa Argentina
8	Douglas Haig	42	14	16	12	45	46	−1	58	Qualification for 2015–16 Copa Argentina
9	Estudiantes (SL)	42	13	17	12	47	44	+3	56	Qualification for 2015–16 Copa Argentina
10	Gimnasia y Esgrima (J)	42	14	13	15	35	43	−8	55	Qualification for 2015–16 Copa Argentina
11	Los Andes	42	12	18	12	46	49	−3	54	Qualification for 2015–16 Copa Argentina
12	Juventud Unida (G)	42	14	12	16	43	47	−4	54	Qualification for 2015–16 Copa Argentina
13	Boca Unidos	42	14	12	16	37	42	−5	54	
14	All Boys	42	13	14	15	38	37	+1	53	
15	Central Córdoba (SdE)	42	12	15	15	37	44	−7	51	
16	Independiente Rivadavia	42	13	12	17	38	46	−8	51	
17	Guaraní Antonio Franco	42	13	11	18	38	43	−5	50	
18	Chacarita Juniors	42	13	11	18	49	62	−13	50	
19	Guillermo Brown	42	11	15	16	43	50	−7	48	
20	Gimnasia y Esgrima (M)	42	14	6	22	37	53	−16	48	
21	Sportivo Belgrano	42	9	13	20	36	50	−14	40	
22	Unión (MdP)	42	7	16	19	36	60	−24	37	

Source: AFA
Rules for classification: 1) points; 2) play-off (only for deciding promotion or relegation); 3) goal difference; 4) goals scored; 5) head-to-head points; 6) head-to-head goal difference; 7) head-to-head goals scored.
(C) Champions; (O) Play-off winners; (P) Promoted

== Results ==
Home \ Away	ALL	APA	ATU	BOC	CCO	CHA	DOU	ESL	FCO	GBR	GEM	GEJ	GUA	IND	INS	JUG	LAN	PAT	SAN	SPO	UNI	VDA
All Boys		1–1	0–0	2–0	2–0	4–1	2–2	0–2	0–0	0–1	2–0	0–0	2–0	2–0	0–2	0–1	1–0	1–1	2–1	0–1	0–0	1–0
Atlético Paraná	0–1		1–1	1–1	1–1	3–1	1–2	1–1	3–2	2–0	1–0	3–0	2–0	2–1	2–0	1–1	2–1	0–2	0–1	2–1	3–0	0–2
Atlético Tucumán	2–1	2–0		3–1	1–1	2–1	2–1	1–0	3–0	0–0	1–0	1–0	3–0	2–0	3–1	2–0	5–0	1–1	2–1	2–0	1–1	3–1
Boca Unidos	1–1	3–1	0–0		2–0	4–1	0–0	1–0	0–0	1–0	1–1	1–0	0–0	0–0	0–1	1–2	0–0	0–0	2–1	1–0	3–0	0–1
C. Córdoba (SdE)	2–0	1–2	3–2	1–0		0–1	0–2	0–1	1–0	1–2	1–0	2–0	1–2	1–3	1–1	0–0	2–0	0–0	2–2	1–0	2–0	1–3
Chacarita Juniors	3–1	1–0	1–3	2–1	2–0		0–0	1–1	2–0	2–0	1–0	0–2	3–1	0–0	1–0	2–1	1–2	1–1	1–3	0–0	3–1	1–0
Douglas Haig	2–2	3–1	1–4	1–2	0–0	2–1		0–0	0–2	1–1	2–0	1–0	0–1	3–1	1–1	0–1	0–0	2–1	1–1	1–0	5–0	2–2
Estudiantes (SL)	0–0	3–2	1–1	0–0	2–2	3–2	1–2		2–0	2–2	2–0	1–0	2–0	1–0	1–3	3–1	3–1	0–1	1–3	1–1	0–0	1–1
Ferro Carril Oeste	2–1	1–0	1–1	2–1	1–0	1–1	0–1	0–3		1–1	1–0	2–0	1–0	1–0	1–0	3–1	1–1	0–1	2–0	3–2	2–0	1–1
Guillermo Brown	1–0	0–3	2–2	2–0	2–2	1–0	0–0	0–2	2–2		0–1	0–1	2–0	0–2	1–2	2–1	3–3	1–1	0–2	1–0	2–0	0–1
Gimnasia y Esgrima (M)	1–2	1–0	0–1	3–1	0–1	2–1	2–0	2–0	0–1	2–1		4–1	1–0	1–3	2–2	1–1	1–1	1–0	0–0	2–1	1–0	1–0
Gimnasia y Esgrima (J)	0–0	2–3	2–1	2–0	0–0	3–2	3–0	0–0	1–1	1–0	2–1		1–0	1–0	1–1	1–4	0–0	1–1	1–1	1–0	0–0	1–0
Guaraní A. Franco	0–0	2–0	2–2	2–0	0–1	2–2	4–0	1–1	1–0	2–1	5–1	0–2		2–0	1–1	3–1	1–1	1–1	2–0	0–0	1–0	1–1
Independiente Rivadavia	0–0	0–0	1–3	0–0	2–0	1–1	1–0	3–2	0–2	3–1	4–2	0–0	0–0		0–1	2–1	1–0	0–2	1–2	1–1	1–1	1–0
Instituto	1–1	0–0	1–0	1–0	0–0	2–2	3–2	2–0	0–0	1–1	2–0	3–1	0–1	0–1		2–1	3–0	0–1	3–2	1–1	1–1	1–1
Juventud Unida (G)	0–1	0–1	0–1	2–0	0–0	2–1	0–0	1–1	2–1	1–0	2–0	0–0	1–0	2–1	0–2		0–1	1–1	0–1	2–0	2–1	0–0
Los Andes	1–0	2–1	1–0	1–2	1–1	1–0	5–2	1–1	1–2	2–2	1–1	1–0	2–0	4–1	0–0	2–2		2–1	0–0	2–1	2–3	0–1
Patronato	1–0	2–1	0–0	4–1	2–0	6–2	0–1	2–0	0–0	0–0	1–0	2–0	1–0	1–0	3–1	1–2	2–1		2–0	3–0	4–0	2–0
Santamarina	2–1	1–1	1–0	2–0	2–2	2–0	0–0	1–0	0–0	1–4	2–0	3–0	2–0	4–2	1–0	3–0	0–0	0–1		0–0	0–1	4–1
Sportivo Belgrano	1–2	0–0	1–1	1–2	1–2	0–0	1–2	1–1	3–1	0–2	3–0	2–1	1–0	0–1	0–0	1–0	1–1	1–3	2–0		1–0	3–3
Unión (MdP)	2–1	0–1	1–2	0–2	1–0	4–1	0–0	1–1	0–0	1–1	0–1	2–3	2–0	0–0	2–2	2–2	1–1	1–1	2–2	4–0		1–3
Villa Dálmine	2–1	2–1	1–2	1–2	1–1	0–0	0–0	3–0	1–3	1–1	2–1	0–0	1–0	0–0	1–0	2–2	0–0	1–0	1–0	0–3	2–0	

Updated to match(es) played on 15 November 2015. Source: AFA
Legend: Blue = home team win; Yellow = draw; Red = away team win.

== Torneo Reducido ==
At the end of the regular season, the four teams placed 2-5 will advance to compete for one place next season in the 2016 Primera División. If a team finishes in 2-5 place but will be relegated, the next highest placed team will advance to the playoff. Teams will play each other over two legs in each round. Matches were played between 19 November – 5 December.

=== Semifinals ===
Team 1	Agg.	Team 2	1st leg	2nd leg
Instituto	2–4	Patronato	1–1	1–3
Santamarina	4–2	Ferro Carril Oeste	2–2	2–0

=== Finals ===
Torneo Reducido Final
(2nd. promotion playoff)
29 November 2015
First leg

Santamarina	3–1	Patronato
Bordón 21'; Michel 70'; Tucker 84'	Report	Quiroga 39'

Estadio Municipal San Martín, Tandil
Referee: Mauro Vigliano

6 December 2015
15:15
Second leg

Patronato	2–0	Santamarina
Garrido 56'; Minetti 73'	Report
Penalties
	6–5

Estadio Bartolomé Grella, Paraná
Referee: Fernando Espinoza

Team details

Patronato
Santamarina

GK	1	Sebastián Bertoli
DF	4	Lautaro Geminiani	Yellow card	(substituted off) a'
DF	2	Walter Andrade
DF	6	Carlos Quintana
DF	3	Diego Martínez
MF	10	Matías Garrido
MF	5	Marcos Minetti	Yellow card
MF	8	Marcos Quiroga		(substituted off) b'
MF	7	Esteban Orfano		(substituted off) c'
FW	11	Diego Jara
FW	9	Matías Quiroga
Substitutions:
MF	15	Marcelo Guzmán		(substituted on) a'
MF	16	Leandro Becerra		(substituted on) c'
FW	18	Lautaro Comas		(substituted on) c'
Manager:
(Argentina) Iván Delfino

GK	1	Leandro Requena
DF	4	Alfredo G. Bordón
DF	2	Roberto Tucker
DF	6	Emiliano Capella
DF	3	Federico Azcárate	Yellow card
MF	11	Juan Gáspari
MF	5	Federico Scoppa	Yellow card
MF	10	Mariano González	Yellow card
MF	8	Arnaldo González		(substituted off) a'
FW	9	Fernando Telechea		(substituted off) b'
FW	7	Martín Michel
Substitutions:
MF	16	Nicolás Fassino		(substituted on) a'
FW	17	Facundo Curuchet		(substituted on) b'
Manager:
(Argentina) Gustavo Coleoni

Note: After the series ended 3–3 on aggregate, Patronato won 6–5 on penalties, promoting to Primera División.

== Relegation ==
The bottom four teams of this table face relegation. Clubs with an indirect affiliation with Argentine Football Association are relegated to the Torneo Federal A, while clubs directly affiliated face relegation to Primera B Metropolitana.

Pos	Team	2012–13 Pts	2013–14 Pts	2014 Pts	2015 Pts	Total Pts	Total Pld	Avg	Relegation
1	Atlético Tucumán	51	64	29	85	229	142	1.613	
2	Patronato	56	49	22	82	209	142	1.472	
3	Santamarina	–	–	24	66	90	62	1.452	
4	Villa Dálmine	—	—	—	60	60	42	1.429	
5	Atlético Paraná	—	—	—	58	58	42	1.381	
6	Gimnasia y Esgrima (J)	50	61	30	55	196	142	1.38	
7	Estudiantes (SL)	—	—	—	56	56	42	1.333	
8	Instituto	39	62	25	62	188	142	1.324	
9	Los Andes	—	—	—	54	54	42	1.286	
10	Douglas Haig	49	51	25	58	183	142	1.289	
11	Juventud Unida (G)	—	—	—	54	54	42	1.286	
12	Ferro Carril Oeste	43	55	16	67	181	142	1.275	
13	Boca Unidos	45	54	27	54	180	142	1.268	
14	Independiente Rivadavia	48	55	22	51	176	142	1.239	
15	Central Córdoba (SdE)	—	—	—	51	51	42	1.214	
16	All Boys	–	–	22	53	75	62	1.21	
17	Chacarita Juniors	—	—	—	50	50	42	1.19	
18	Guillermo Brown	–	–	–	48	48	42	1.143	Relegation Playoff
19	Gimnasia y Esgrima (M) (R)	—	—	—	48	48	42	1.143	Relegation Playoff
20	Guaraní Antonio Franco (R)	—	—	18	50	68	62	1.097	Torneo Federal A
21	Sportivo Belgrano (R)	—	53	17	40	110	104	1.058	Torneo Federal A
22	Unión (MdP) (R)	—	—	—	37	37	42	0.881	Torneo Federal A

Source: AFA

As of 18 November 2015

=== Relegation playoff ===
A single play-off match was played on 25 November 2015 to determine the fourth team to be relegated. Gimnasia y Esgrima de Mendoza lost the play-off match on penalties and were relegated.

25 November 2015
17:00

Gimnasia y Esgrima (M)	1–1	Guillermo Brown
Montiveros (red card) 102'; Marín 105+1'	Report	Sánchez (yellow card) 48' (yellow-red card) 90'; Mosca (red card) 98'; Rivadero 105+4'
Penalties
Albornoz (penalty scored); Carranza (penalty scored); Farías (penalty scored); Carrizo (penalty missed); Corvalán (penalty scored); Espinosa (penalty missed)	4–5	(penalty scored) Bottino; (penalty scored) Barone; (penalty scored) Susvielles; (penalty scored) Marinucci; (penalty missed) Rivadero; (penalty scored) Ciampichetti

Diego A. Maradona

== See also ==
- 2015 Argentine Primera División
- 2014–15 Copa Argentina
