= Juventud Unida de Gualeguaychú =

Argentine sports club

Juventud Unida
- Full name: Club Deportivo Juventud Unida de Gualeguaychú
- Nickname(s): Decano; León; Juve
- Founded: May 1, 1907; 118 years ago
- Ground: Estadio De Los Eucaliptos; Gualeguaychú, Entre Ríos
- Capacity: 10,000
- Chairman: Blas Fiorovic
- Manager: Javier Osella
- League: Torneo Federal A
- 2017-18: 15° (Relegated from Primera B Nacional)
Home colours	Away colours

Club Deportivo Juventud Unida is an Argentine sports club. The football team currently plays in the Torneo Federal A, the third level of the Argentine football league system.

The club is located in Gualeguaychú, a city of Entre Ríos Province. Other sports played in the club are basketball, with a senior team competing in the Provincial League of Entre Ríos, and tennis.

== History ==
In 2014, the team played the Torneo Federal A (former Torneo Argentino A), where it earned promotion to the Nacional B after beating 2–1 to Gimnasia y Esgrima (CdU) in the Concepción del Uruguay stadium.

== Stadium ==
Club's stadium is named De Los Eucaliptos, located on the corner of Padred Schachtel and Luis Palma streets of Gualeguaychú. It was remodeled in 2012, while the senior team played the 2011–12 Torneo Argentino B season. Previous to that, Juventud Unida played its home games at Estadio Municipal.

On May 15, 2012, the club reopened its stadium with an attendance of 5,500 people, before the match against Sportivo Las Parejas.
