= 2013–14 Torneo Argentino A =

2013-2014 Argentine football league season

XIX Torneo Argentino A
- Season: 2013–14
- Champions: Santamarina (1st divisional title)
- Promoted: Santamarina; Guaraní Antonio Franco
- Relegated: Rivadavia; Racing (O); Central Norte
- Matches: 387
- Goals: 929 (2.4 per match)
- Top goalscorer: Fernando Zampedri (22 Goals)

The 2013–14 season, was the nineteenth Torneo Argentino A season since it became part of the third tier of the Argentine football league system. The tournament is reserved for teams indirectly affiliated to the Asociación del Fútbol Argentino (AFA), while teams affiliated to AFA have to play the Primera B Metropolitana, which is the other third-tier competition. The champion will be promoted to Primera B Nacional.

The regular season began on August 16, 2013, and was scheduled to end on June 7, 2014. A total of 24 teams competed with 20 of them remaining from the 2012–13 season. They were joined by four teams promoted from 2012–13 Torneo Argentino B.

== Club information ==
=== North Zone ===
Team	City	Stadium
Central Córdoba	Santiago del Estero	Alfredo Terrara
Central Norte	Salta	Dr. Luis Güemes
Chaco For Ever	Resistencia	Juan Alberto García
Gimnasia y Esgrima	Concepción del Uruguay	Manuel y Ramón Núñez
Gimnasia y Tiro	Salta	Gigante del Norte
Guaraní Antonio Franco	Posadas	Clemente F. de Oliveira
Juventud Antoniana	Salta	Fray Honorato Pistoia
Juventud Unida	Gualeguaychú	Luis Delfino
Libertad	Sunchales	Hogar de Los Tigres
San Jorge	San Miguel de Tucumán	Senador Luis Cruz
San Martín	San Miguel de Tucumán	La Ciudadela
Tiro Federal	Rosario	Fortín de Ludueña

=== South Zone ===
Club	City	Stadium
Alvarado	Mar del Plata	(None) ^{1}
CAI	Comodoro Rivadavia	Estadio Municipal
Cipolletti	Cipolletti	La Visera de Cemento
Defensores de Belgrano	Villa Ramallo	Salomón Boeseldín
Deportivo Maipú	Maipú	Higinio Sperdutti
Estudiantes	San Luis	Héctor Odicino – Pedro Benoza
Guillermo Brown	Puerto Madryn	Raul Conti
Juventud Unida Universitario	San Luis	Mario Diez
Racing	Olavarría	José Buglione
Rivadavia	Lincoln	El Coliseo
Santamarina	Tandil	Municipal Gral. San Martín
Unión	Mar del Plata	(None) ^{1}

^{1} Play their home games at Estadio José María Minella.

=== Geographical distribution ===
Province	Amount	Teams
(Buenos Aires Province) Interior of Buenos Aires	6	Alvarado, Defensores de Belgrano (VR), Racing (O), Rivadavia (L), Santamarina, Unión (MdP)
(Salta Province) Salta	3	Central Norte, Gimnasia y Tiro, Juventud Antoniana
(Chubut Province) Chubut	2	CAI, Guillermo Brown
(Entre Ríos Province) Entre Ríos	2	Gimnasia y Esgrima (CdU), Juventud Unida (G)
(San Luis Province) San Luis	2	Estudiantes (SL), Juventud Unida Universitario
(Santa Fe Province) Santa Fe	2	Libertad (S), Tiro Federal
(Tucumán Province) Tucumán	2	San Jorge (T), San Martín (T)
(Chaco Province) Chaco	1	Chaco For Ever
(Mendoza Province) Mendoza	1	Deportivo Maipú
(Misiones Province) Misiones	1	Guaraní Antonio Franco
(Río Negro Province) Río Negro	1	Cipolletti
(Santiago del Estero Province) Santiago del Estero	1	Central Córdoba (SdE)
Total	24	

== First stage ==
The teams were divided into two zones, North and South, all of which went to the Second Stage: the first four of each zone and the fifth best team of both zones qualified to the "Nonagonal Final", and the other teams qualified to Revalida Stage.

=== North Zone ===
Pos	Team	Pld	W	D	L	GF	GA	GD	Pts	Qualification
1	Tiro Federal	22	9	8	5	30	20	+10	35	Qualified for the Nonagonal Final
2	Guaraní Antonio Franco	22	10	5	7	19	20	−1	35	Qualified for the Nonagonal Final
3	San Martín (T)	22	8	10	4	21	16	+5	34	Qualified for the Nonagonal Final
4	Juventud Unida (G)	22	10	4	8	22	19	+3	34	Qualified for the Nonagonal Final
5	Central Córdoba (SdE)	22	8	7	7	23	23	0	31	Qualified for the Revalida Stage
6	San Jorge (T)	22	9	4	9	22	23	−1	31	Qualified for the Revalida Stage
7	Juventud Antoniana	22	7	9	6	21	17	+4	30	Qualified for the Revalida Stage
8	Libertad (S)	22	7	9	6	22	19	+3	30	Qualified for the Revalida Stage
9	Central Norte	22	6	8	8	26	27	−1	26	Qualified for the Revalida Stage
10	Gimnasia y Esgrima (CdU)	22	7	4	11	25	36	−11	25	Qualified for the Revalida Stage
11	Gimnasia y Tiro	22	5	6	11	26	30	−4	21	Qualified for the Revalida Stage
12	Chaco For Ever	22	3	12	7	24	31	−7	21	Qualified for the Revalida Stage

==== Results ====
Home \ Away	CCO	CNO	CFE	GYE	GYT	GAF	JUA	JUG	LIB	SJT	SMT	TIF
Central Córdoba (SdE)		1–0	2–2	1–0	1–0	4–0	2–0	1–0	1–3	1–1	0–0	0–0
Central Norte	0–1		3–3	3–0	1–0	0–0	2–0	2–0	2–1	2–0	2–2	1–1
Chaco For Ever	1–0	1–1		4–4	2–2	0–0	0–0	1–2	0–0	1–1	0–2	1–2
Gimnasia y Esgrima (CdU)	1–0	2–1	1–2		4–3	0–1	0–0	0–2	0–0	4–2	1–2	3–2
Gimnasia y Tiro	3–0	2–2	1–0	0–1		0–0	2–3	3–1	1–2	4–2	0–1	2–1
Guaraní Antonio Franco	4–1	3–1	0–0	1–0	1–0		1–0	0–0	1–0	2–1	0–1	0–1
Juventud Antoniana	0–0	0–0	2–2	4–1	0–0	3–0		2–1	0–0	2–0	1–0	2–1
Juventud Unida (G)	2–1	2–1	1–0	0–1	3–0	0–1	1–0		2–1	1–0	1–2	1–0
Libertad (S)	0–1	3–1	2–0	2–0	1–1	2–0	2–2	1–1		1–0	1–1	0–0
San Jorge (T)	3–2	1–0	0–1	2–0	2–1	2–0	1–0	0–0	2–0		0–0	1–0
San Martín (T)	1–1	1–1	3–1	0–0	1–0	1–3	1–0	1–1	0–0	0–1		1–1
Tiro Federal	2–2	3–0	2–2	4–2	1–1	2–1	0–0	1–0	3–0	1–0	1–0	

Updated to match(es) played on March 9, 2014. Source: AFA
Legend: Blue = home team win; Yellow = draw; Red = away team win.

=== South Zone ===
Pos	Team	Pld	W	D	L	GF	GA	GD	Pts	Qualification
1	Santamarina	22	13	6	3	33	21	+12	45	Qualified for the Nonagonal Final
2	Juventud Unida Universitario	22	11	5	6	35	20	+15	38	Qualified for the Nonagonal Final
3	Defensores de Belgrano (VR)	22	11	4	7	34	23	+11	37	Qualified for the Nonagonal Final
4	Guillermo Brown	22	9	6	7	31	24	+7	33	Qualified for the Nonagonal Final
5	CAI	22	10	3	9	37	33	+4	33	Qualified for the Nonagonal Final
6	Cipolletti	22	9	5	8	29	25	+4	32	Qualified for the Revalida Stage
7	Deportivo Maipú	22	7	8	7	24	32	−8	29	Qualified for the Revalida Stage
8	Unión (MdP)	22	7	7	8	26	27	−1	28	Qualified for the Revalida Stage
9	Alvarado	22	6	9	7	13	16	−3	27	Qualified for the Revalida Stage
10	Estudiantes (SL)	22	7	6	9	28	32	−4	27	Qualified for the Revalida Stage
11	Racing (O)	22	4	6	12	22	37	−15	18	Qualified for the Revalida Stage
12	Rivadavia (L)	22	4	3	15	18	40	−22	15	Qualified for the Revalida Stage

==== Results ====
Home \ Away	ALV	CAI	CIP	DVR	DMA	ESL	GBR	JUU	RAC	RIV	SAN	UNI
Alvarado		0–3	1–1	1–0	2–0	1–1	0–0	0–0	1–3	0–0	0–0	4–0
CAI	0–1		2–0	2–3	1–2	5–4	0–0	0–2	2–0	3–1	2–0	1–0
Cipolletti	2–0	1–2		1–0	5–0	2–1	2–2	2–1	0–0	3–2	2–2	0–1
Defensores de Belgrano (VR)	1–0	1–0	2–0		2–1	0–2	1–0	0–1	5–2	3–1	2–2	2–0
Deportivo Maipú	0–0	2–1	1–2	1–0		2–2	2–0	1–1	3–2	1–2	0–0	2–0
Estudiantes (SL)	0–1	0–2	1–1	1–3	0–0		2–1	0–1	1–0	2–0	3–1	3–2
Guillermo Brown	3–0	1–1	1–0	4–2	5–1	3–0		2–1	3–0	2–0	2–0	0–2
Juventud Unida Universitario	1–0	5–2	1–0	2–2	3–3	0–1	5–0		1–0	2–0	0–1	2–0
Racing (O)	0–0	1–2	0–1	0–0	1–0	1–1	2–0	1–4		2–1	1–2	2–2
Rivadavia (L)	0–1	3–2	1–2	0–4	0–1	3–1	1–0	1–1	1–2		0–1	1–1
Santamarina	1–0	2–2	2–1	1–0	3–0	1–0	2–2	2–1	4–2	2–0		2–1
Unión (MdP)	0–0	4–2	2–1	1–1	0–0	2–2	0–0	2–0	2–0	4–0	0–2	

Updated to match(es) played on March 9, 2014. Source: AFA
Legend: Blue = home team win; Yellow = draw; Red = away team win.

== Second stage ==
=== Nonagonal Final ===
It consisted of nine teams that qualified from the First Stage (4 from the North Zone and 5 from the South Zone). The winner was promoted to the Primera B Nacional. It was played in a round-robin system. The 2 and 3 team advanced directly to the Fourth Stage, while the 4th to the 9th advanced to the Third Stage.

Pos	Team	Pld	W	D	L	GF	GA	GD	Pts	Qualification
1	Santamarina (C, P)	8	6	1	1	15	6	+9	19	Champion, promoted to Primera B Nacional
2	CAI	8	5	2	1	19	9	+10	17	Qualified for the Fourth Stage
3	Guaraní Antonio Franco	8	4	1	3	15	16	−1	13	Qualified for the Fourth Stage
4	Defensores de Belgrano (VR)	8	4	0	4	10	15	−5	12	Qualified for the Third Stage
5	San Martín (T)	8	3	2	3	14	10	+4	11	Qualified for the Third Stage
6	Guillermo Brown	8	2	3	3	8	13	−5	9	Qualified for the Third Stage
7	Tiro Federal	8	2	2	4	9	12	−3	8	Qualified for the Third Stage
8	Juventud Unida Universitario	8	2	1	5	11	15	−4	7	Qualified for the Third Stage
9	Juventud Unida (G)	8	1	2	5	7	12	−5	5	Qualified for the Third Stage

(C) Champions; (P) Promoted

==== Results ====
Home \ Away	CAI	DVR	GAF	GBR	JUG	JUU	SAN	SMT	TIF
CAI			5–1	1–1		3–1			2–0
Defensores de Belgrano (VR)	1–4		3–1			2–1			2–0
Guaraní Antonio Franco				3–0	2–0		2–2	3–2	
Guillermo Brown		3–0			1–0		0–4	0–0	
Juventud Unida (G)	2–2	1–2					1–3	1–2	
Juventud Unida Universitario			1–2	4–2	0–2				2–1
Santamarina	2–0	1–0				1–0		1–0	
San Martín (T)	1–2	4–0				2–2			3–1
Tiro Federal			3–1	1–1	0–0		3–1		

Updated to match(es) played on April 29, 2014. Source: AFA
Legend: Blue = home team win; Yellow = draw; Red = away team win.

=== Reválida Stage ===
The fifteen clubs that did not qualify for the Nonagonal Final were grouped into three zones of five teams each. To integrate the zones a table was drawn with the fifteen clubs and its overall standings with points obtained in the First Stage. Teams in position 1,6,7,12,15 went to Zone A; teams in position 2,5,8,11,14 went to Zone B and teams in position 3,4,9,10,13 went to Zone C.

Pos	Team	Pld	W	D	L	GF	GA	GD	Pts	Qualification
1	Cipolletti	22	9	5	8	29	25	+4	32	Zone A
2	Central Córdoba (SdE)	22	8	7	7	23	23	0	31	Zone B
3	San Jorge (T)	22	9	4	9	22	23	−1	31	Zone C
4	Juventud Antoniana	22	7	9	6	21	17	+4	30	Zone C
5	Libertad (S)	22	7	9	6	22	19	+3	30	Zone B
6	Deportivo Maipú	22	7	8	7	24	32	−8	29	Zone A
7	Unión (MdP)	22	7	7	8	26	27	−1	28	Zone A
8	Alvarado	22	6	9	7	13	16	−3	27	Zone B
9	Estudiantes (SL)	22	7	6	9	28	32	−4	27	Zone C
10	Central Norte	22	6	8	8	26	27	−1	26	Zone C
11	Gimnasia y Esgrima (CdU)	22	7	4	11	25	36	−11	25	Zone B
12	Gimnasia y Tiro	22	5	6	11	26	30	−4	21	Zone A
13	Chaco For Ever	22	3	12	7	24	31	−7	21	Zone C
14	Racing (O)	22	4	6	12	22	37	−15	18	Zone B
15	Rivadavia (L)	22	4	3	15	18	40	−22	15	Zone A

==== Zone A ====
Pos	Team	Pld	W	D	L	GF	GA	GD	Pts	Qualification
1	Cipolletti	8	4	2	2	7	8	−1	14	Qualified for the Third Stage
2	Gimnasia y Tiro	8	3	3	2	11	7	+4	12	Qualified for the Third Stage
3	Unión (MdP)	8	2	4	2	11	9	+2	10	
4	Rivadavia (L)	8	2	3	3	11	14	−3	9	
5	Deportivo Maipú	8	1	4	3	13	15	−2	7	

===== Results =====
Home \ Away	CIP	DMA	GYT	RIV	UNI
Cipolletti		1–1	1–0	1–1	2–1
Deportivo Maipú	1–0		2–2	4–5	1–1
Gimnasia y Tiro	4–0	3–2		1–0	0–0
Rivadavia (L)	0–1	2–1	0–0		2–2
Unión (MdP)	0–1	1–1	2–1	4–1	

Updated to match(es) played on April 27, 2014. Source: AFA
Legend: Blue = home team win; Yellow = draw; Red = away team win.

===== Overall standings =====
Addition of points of First Stage and Reválida Stage.

Pos	Team	Pld	W	D	L	GF	GA	GD	Pts	Relegation
1	Cipolletti	30	13	7	10	36	33	+3	46	
2	Unión (MdP)	30	9	11	10	37	36	+1	38	
3	Deportivo Maipú	30	8	12	10	37	47	−10	36	
4	Gimnasia y Tiro	30	8	9	13	37	37	0	33	
5	Rivadavia (L)	30	6	6	18	29	54	−25	24	Relegated to the Torneo Argentino B

==== Zone B ====
Pos	Team	Pld	W	D	L	GF	GA	GD	Pts	Qualification
1	Central Córdoba	8	4	3	1	12	6	+6	15	Qualified for the Third Stage
2	Libertad (S)	8	2	6	0	10	6	+4	12	Qualified for the Third Stage
3	Alvarado	8	3	3	2	11	9	+2	12	
4	Gimnasia y Esgrima (CdU)	8	2	4	2	7	5	+2	10	
5	Racing (O)	8	0	2	6	3	17	−14	2	

===== Results =====
Home \ Away	ALV	CCO	GYE	LIB	RAC
Alvarado		2–2	1–0	1–1	2–0
Central Córdoba	2–0		1–0	1–1	5–1
Gimnasia y Esgrima (CdU)	2–2	2–0		0–0	2–0
Libertad (S)	2–1	0–0	1–1		2–2
Racing (O)	0–2	0–1	0–0	0–3	

Updated to match(es) played on April 27, 2014. Source: AFA
Legend: Blue = home team win; Yellow = draw; Red = away team win.

===== Overall standings =====
Addition of points of First Stage and Reválida Stage.

Pos	Team	Pld	W	D	L	GF	GA	GD	Pts	Relegation
1	Central Córdoba	30	12	10	8	35	29	+6	46	
2	Libertad (S)	30	9	15	6	32	25	+7	42	
3	Alvarado	30	9	12	9	24	25	−1	39	
4	Gimnasia y Esgrima (CdU)	30	9	8	13	32	41	−9	35	
5	Racing (O)	30	4	8	18	25	54	−29	20	Relegated to the Torneo Argentino B

==== Zone C ====
Pos	Team	Pld	W	D	L	GF	GA	GD	Pts	Qualification
1	Chaco For Ever	8	6	0	2	13	5	+8	18	Qualified for the Third Stage
2	Estudiantes (SL)	8	3	3	2	8	7	+1	12	Qualified for the Third Stage
3	Central Norte	8	3	2	3	8	9	−1	11	
4	San Jorge (T)	8	2	2	4	6	9	−3	8	
5	Juventud Antoniana	8	2	1	5	7	12	−5	7	

===== Results =====
Home \ Away	CNO	CFE	ESL	JUA	SJT
Central Norte		1–0	1–1	0–2	2–0
Chaco For Ever	2–0		2–0	3–0	2–1
Estudiantes (SL)	1–2	2–0		3–2	0–0
Juventud Antoniana	0–0	1–3	0–1		2–1
San Jorge (T)	3–2	0–1	0–0	1–0	

Updated to match(es) played on April 27, 2014. Source: AFA
Legend: Blue = home team win; Yellow = draw; Red = away team win.

===== Overall standings =====
Addition of points of First Stage and Reválida Stage.

Pos	Team	Pld	W	D	L	GF	GA	GD	Pts	Relegation
1	Chaco For Ever	30	9	12	9	37	36	+1	39	
2	San Jorge (T)	30	11	6	13	28	32	−4	39	
3	Estudiantes (SL)	30	10	9	11	36	39	−3	39	
4	Juventud Antoniana	30	9	10	11	28	29	−1	37	
5	Central Norte	30	9	10	11	34	36	−2	37	Relegated to the Torneo Argentino B

===== Tiebreaker =====
Team 1	Score	Team 2
Juventud Antoniana	0–0(5–3 p)	Central Norte

== Third to Sixth stage ==
Was played by the teams ranked 2nd to 9th in the Nonagonal Final and the teams that qualified from Revalida Stage. To order the matches a table was drawn which contained the teams from the Nonagonal Final and the teams from the Revalida numbering them from 2º to 15º (teams from Nonagonal Final were 2º to 9º and teams from Revalida were 10º to º15).

=== From Nonagonal Final ===
Pos	Team	Pld	W	D	L	GF	GA	GD	Pts
2	CAI	8	5	2	1	19	9	+10	17
3	Guaraní Antonio Franco	8	4	1	3	15	16	−1	13
4	Defensores de Belgrano (VR)	8	4	0	4	10	15	−5	12
5	San Martín (T)	8	3	2	3	14	10	+4	11
6	Guillermo Brown	8	2	3	3	8	13	−5	9
7	Tiro Federal	8	2	2	4	9	12	−3	8
8	Juventud Unida Universitario	8	2	1	5	11	15	−4	7
9	Juventud Unida (G)	8	1	2	5	7	12	−5	5

=== From Revalida ===
Pos	Team	Pld	W	D	L	GF	GA	GD	Pts
10	Chaco For Ever	8	6	0	2	13	5	+8	18
11	Central Córdoba	8	4	3	1	12	6	+6	15
12	Cipolletti	8	4	2	2	7	8	−1	14
13	Gimnasia y Tiro	8	3	3	2	14	10	+4	12
14	Libertad (S)	8	2	6	0	10	6	+4	12
15	Estudiantes (SL)	8	3	3	2	8	7	+1	12

=== Third stage ===
This Stage was played by the teams in position 4º to 9º from the Nonagonal Final and the teams from the Revalida. The winning teams qualify for Fourth Stage. In case of a tie the teams from position 4º to 9º qualified for the next stage (teams of the left column).

Team 1	Agg.	Team 2	1st leg	2nd leg
Defensores de Belgrano (VR)	4–5	Estudiantes (SL)	2–1	2–4
San Martín (T)	4–2	Libertad (S)	2–1	2–1
Guillermo Brown^{1}	3–3	Gimnasia y Tiro	1–2	2–1
Tiro Federal	3–2	Cipolletti	0–2	3–0
Juventud Unida Universitario	3–0	Central Córdoba (SdE)	2–0	1–0
Juventud Unida (G)	5–2	Chaco For Ever	1–1	4–1

1: Qualified because of sport advantage.

=== Bracket ===
Fourth Stage
2	CAI	1	3	4
15	Estudiantes (SL)	2	2	4
5	San Martín (T)	0	1	1
8	Juventud Unida Univ.	1	1	2
3	Guaraní Antonio Franco	1	4	5
9	Juventud Unida (G)	3	0	3
6	Guillermo Brown	0	1	1
7	Tiro Federal	1	1	2

Fifth Stage
2	CAI	1	1	2
8	Juventud Unida Univ.	2	1	3
3	Guaraní Antonio Franco	2	1	3
7	Tiro Federal	1	2	3

Sixth Stage
3	Guaraní Antonio Franco	1	1	2
8	Juventud Unida Univ.	2	0	2

- Note: The team in the first line plays at home the second leg.

=== Fourth stage ===
This Stage was played by the teams ranked 2º and 3º Nonagonal Final and the teams that qualified from the Third Stage. In case of a tie the teams from position 2º, 3º, W1 and W2 qualified for the next stage (teams of the left column).

Team 1	Agg.	Team 2	1st leg	2nd leg
CAI^{1}	4–4	Estudiantes (SL)	1–2	3–2
Guaraní Antonio Franco	5–3	Juventud Unida (G)	1–3	4–0
Guillermo Brown	1–2	Tiro Federal	0–1	1–1
San Martín (T)	1–2	Juventud Unida Universitario	0–1	1–1

1: Qualified because of sport advantage.

=== Fifth stage ===
This Stage was played by the teams that qualified from the Fourth Stage. The matches will be W1 vs W4 and W2 vs W3. In case of a tie, W1 and W2 qualified for the next stage (teams of the left column).

Team 1	Agg.	Team 2	1st leg	2nd leg
CAI	2–3	Juventud Unida Universitario	1–2	1–1
Guaraní Antonio Franco^{1}	3–3	Tiro Federal	2–1	1–2

1: Qualified because of sport advantage.

=== Sixth stage ===
This Stage was played by the teams that qualified from the Fifth Stage, W1 vs W2. The winning team will be promoted to Primera B Nacional. In case of a tie, W1 was promoted (team of the left column).

Team 1	Agg.	Team 2	1st leg	2nd leg
Guaraní Antonio Franco	2–2	Juventud Unida Universitario	1–2	1–0

1: Promoted because of sport advantage.

== Season statistics ==
=== Top scorers ===
Rank	Player	Club	Goals
1	(Argentina) Fernando Zampedri	Guillermo Brown	22
2	(Argentina) Mauro Villegas	CAI	21
3	(Argentina) Pablo Vilchez	Santamarina	17
3	(Argentina) Aldo Visconti	Chaco For Ever	17
3	(Argentina) Jorge Piñero da Silva	CAI	17
6	(Argentina) Oscar Altamirano	Central Norte	16

== See also ==
- 2013–14 in Argentine football
