= Club y Biblioteca Ramón Santamarina =

Argentine football club

Santamarina
- Full name: Club y Biblioteca Ramón Santamarina
- Nicknames: Aurinegro; Santa
- Founded: 20 December 1913; 112 years ago
- Ground: Estadio Municipal General San Martín, Tandil; Buenos Aires Province, Argentina
- Capacity: 8,762
- Chairman: Pablo Bossio
- Manager: Jorge Sotelo
- League: Primera Nacional
- 2022: Primera Nacional, 36th (Relegated)
- Website: https://web.archive.org/web/20101123165811/http://www.csydsantamarina.com.ar/
Home colours	Away colours

Club y Biblioteca Ramón Santamarina, also known simply as Santamarina, is an Argentine football club from the city of Tandil, Buenos Aires Province. The team currently plays in Torneo Federal A, the tournament of third division of the Argentine Football Association. The club is named after Joaquin Ramón Cesareo Manuel Santamarina (1827–1904), an Argentine businessman.

The club has played one season in the Argentine Primera. In 1985, it competed in the National championships, where it finished second in their group to qualify for the 2nd round where it was eliminated by Independiente 6–3 on aggregate.

== Players ==
=== Current squad ===
As of 2 August 2022.

Note: Flags indicate national team as defined under FIFA eligibility rules; some limited exceptions apply. Players may hold more than one non-FIFA nationality.

No.	Pos.	Nation	Player
—	GK	ARG	Juan Pablo Mazza
—	GK	ARG	Nicolás Temperini
—	GK	ARG	Santiago Casal
—	DF	ARG	Mateo Palmieri
—	DF	URU	Emilio MacEachen
—	DF	ARG	Tobías Coppo
—	DF	ARG	Agustín Osinaga
—	DF	ARG	Facundo Fernández
—	DF	ARG	Facundo Leiva
—	DF	ARG	Agustin Jara
—	DF	ARG	Enzo Espinoza
—	DF	ARG	Lucas Vallejos
—	DF	ARG	Federico Rotela
—	DF	ARG	Juan Cruz Ridao
—	MF	ARG	Alexis Vega

No.	Pos.	Nation	Player
—	MF	ARG	Guillermo Santillán
—	MF	ARG	Tomás Pérez Serra
—	MF	ARG	Santiago Sayago
—	MF	ARG	Nicolás Valerio
—	MF	ARG	Agustín Rojas (loan from Racing Club)
—	MF	ARG	Guillermo Vernetti
—	FW	ARG	Enzo Gelabert
—	FW	ARG	Braian Maidana (loan from Huracán)
—	FW	ARG	Alan Bonansea
—	FW	ARG	Guillermo Villalba
—	FW	ARG	Ezequiel Saporiti
—	FW	ARG	Elián Tus
—	FW	ARG	Matías Alustiza
—	FW	ARG	Alejandro Gagliardi
—	FW	ARG	Martín Michel

== Honours ==
- Torneo Argentino A (1): 2013–14
- Torneo Argentino B (1): 2005–06
- Liga Tandilense: 31
