= 2015–16 Copa Argentina =

Tournament details
- Country: Argentina
- Teams: 75

Final positions
- Champions: River Plate
- Runners-up: Rosario Central
- 2017 Copa Libertadores: River Plate

Tournament statistics
- Matches played: 85
- Goals scored: 204 (2.4 per match)
- Top goal scorer: Lucas Alario (7 goals)

The 2015–16 Copa Argentina was the seventh edition of the Copa Argentina, and the fifth since the relaunch of the tournament in 2011. The competition began on January 29, 2016. Defending champions Boca Juniors were eliminated by Rosario Central in the quarterfinals. By winning the competition, River Plate won the right to play in the 2017 Copa Libertadores and the 2016 Supercopa Argentina.

== Teams ==
The 75 teams that took part in the competition included: all teams from the Primera División (30); twelve teams of the Primera B Nacional; five from the Primera B Metropolitana, four from the Primera C; two from the Primera D; ten teams from Federal A and twelve (12) from Torneo Federal B.

=== First Level ===
==== Primera División ====
All thirty teams qualified.

- Aldosivi
- Argentinos Juniors
- Arsenal
- Atlético de Rafaela
- Banfield
- Belgrano
- Boca Juniors^{TH}
- Colón
- Crucero del Norte
- Defensa y Justicia
- Estudiantes (LP)
- Gimnasia y Esgrima (LP)
- Godoy Cruz
- Huracán
- Independiente
- Lanús
- Newell's Old Boys
- Nueva Chicago
- Olimpo
- Quilmes
- Racing Club
- River Plate
- Rosario Central
- San Lorenzo
- San Martín (SJ)
- Sarmiento
- Temperley
- Tigre
- Unión
- Vélez Sársfield

=== Second Level ===
The first twelve teams from 2015 tournament qualified.

==== Primera B Nacional ====
- Atlético Tucumán
- Patronato
- Ferro Carril Oeste
- Santamarina
- Instituto
- Villa Dálmine
- Atlético Paraná
- Douglas Haig
- Estudiantes (SL)
- Gimnasia y Esgrima (J)
- Los Andes
- Juventud Unida (G)

=== Third Level ===
==== Primera B Metropolitana ====
The champion and the four teams that reached the semifinals of the Torneo Reducido qualified.

- Brown
- Estudiantes (BA)
- Defensores de Belgrano
- Deportivo Morón
- Almagro

==== Torneo Federal A ====
The two teams promoted, the losing team of the seventh stage, two losing teams of the sixth stage, four losing teams of the fifth stage, and the best losing team of the fourth stage of the 2015 tournament qualified.

- Talleres (C)
- Juventud Unida Universitario
- Unión (S)
- Defensores de Belgrano (VR)
- Unión Aconquija
- Gimnasia y Tiro
- Cipolletti
- Deportivo Madryn
- San Lorenzo (A)
- Juventud Antoniana

=== Fourth Level ===
==== Primera C Metropolitana ====
The first 4 teams from 2015 tournament qualified.

- San Telmo
- Laferrere
- Talleres (RdE)
- Central Córdoba (R)

==== Torneo Federal B ====
The three teams promoted, the three losing teams of the fifth stage, and six losing teams of the fourth stage of the 2015 tournament qualified.

- Villa Mitre
- Defensores (P)
- Güemes
- Sportivo Rivadavia
- San Martín (M)
- San Martín (F)
- Germinal
- Sansinena
- La Emilia
- Unión Santiago
- Sportivo Guzmán
- Central Norte

=== Fifth Level ===
==== Primera D Metropolitana ====
The champion and the runners-up of the 2015 tournament qualified.

- Sportivo Barracas
- Atlas

== Round and draw dates ==
Stage	Round	Draw date	First leg	Second leg
Qualifying stage	Regional Round	29 January 2016	January 29 – February 17, 2016	February 5–20, 2016
Final stage	Round of 64	7 April 2016	May 4 – July 31, 2016	
Final stage	Round of 32	7 April 2016	August 2–31, 2016	
Final stage	Round of 16	7 April 2016	September 3 – October 19, 2016	
Final stage	Quarterfinals	7 April 2016	October 5 – November 17, 2016	
Final stage	Semifinals	7 April 2016	November 30, 2016 – December 1, 2016	
Final stage	Final	7 April 2016	December 15, 2016	

== Regional Round ==
This round is organized by the Consejo Federal.

=== Group A ===
In this first round, 7 teams from the Torneo Federal A and 9 teams from the Torneo Federal B participated. The round was played between January 31 and February 20, on a home-and-away two-legged tie. The 8 winning teams advanced to the Final Round.

Team 1	Agg.	Team 2	1st leg	2nd leg
Gimnasia y Tiro	2–1	Central Norte	2–0	0–1
Unión Aconquija	5–1	San Lorenzo (A)	2–1	3–0
Defensores de Belgrano (VR)	5–3	La Emilia	4–1	1–2
Unión (S)	3–1	Unión Santiago	1–0	2–1
San Martín (F)	3–1	Sportivo Guzmán	0–1	3–0
San Martín (M)	2–2 (a)	Sportivo Rivadavia	0–1	2–1
Deportivo Madryn	5–0	Germinal	1–0	4–0
Cipolletti	1–2	Sansinena	1–1	0–1

==== First leg ====
January 31, 2016	Central Norte	0–2	Gimnasia y Tiro	Salta, Pcia. de Salta
18:00		Report	Amieva 56', 73'	Stadium: Estadio Padre Ernesto Martearena; Referee: Gustavo Fabián

January 31, 2016	San Lorenzo (A)	1–2	Unión Aconquija	San Fernando del Valle de Catamarca, Pcia. de Catamarca
19:00	Girard 22' (pen.)	Report	Vega 19'; Guardo 50'	Stadium: Bicentenario Ciudad de Catamarca; Referee: Francisco Acosta

January 31, 2016	La Emilia	1–4	Defensores de Belgrano (VR)	La Emilia, Pcia. de Buenos Aires
20:00	Garavano 21'	Report	Mantia 31', 53'; Merello 46' (o.g.); Fernández 62'	Stadium: Jacinto López; Referee: Fernando Marconi

January 31, 2016	Unión Santiago	0–1	Unión (S)	Santiago del Estero, Pcia. de Santiago del Estero
21:00		Report	Gaitán 43'	Stadium: Unión Santiago; Referee: Ariel Montero

February 6, 2016	Sportivo Guzmán	1–0	San Martín (F)	San Miguel de Tucumán, Pcia. de Tucumán
17:15	Merello 89' (o.g.)	Report		Stadium: Humberto Rizza; Referee: Francisco Acosta

February 7, 2016	Sportivo Rivadavia	1–0	San Martín (M)	Venado Tuerto, Pcia. de Santa Fe
20:00	Canelo 59'	Report		Stadium: El Coloso; Referee: Carlos Córdoba

February 17, 2016	Germinal	0–1	Deportivo Madryn	Rawson, Pcia. de Chubut
17:00		Report	Aillapán 90+2' (pen.)	Stadium: El Fortín; Referee: Sergio Testa

January 31, 2016	Sansinena	1–1	Cipolletti	General Daniel Cerri, Pcia. de Buenos Aires
17:30	Linares 22'	Report	Rinaudo 61'	Stadium: Luis Molina; Referee: Lucas Novelli Sanz

==== Second leg ====
February 11, 2016	Gimnasia y Tiro	0–1	Central Norte	Salta, Pcia. de Salta
22:00		Report	Reyes 3'	Stadium: Estadio Padre Ernesto Martearena; Referee: Ariel Montero

Gimnasia y Tiro won 2–1 on aggregate.

February 10, 2016	Unión Aconquija	3–0	San Lorenzo (A)	Aconquija, Pcia. de Catamarca
17:00	Moreno 4' (pen.); Martínez 52', 85'	Report		Stadium: Municipal de Aconquija; Referee: Hernán Paz

Unión Aconquija won 5–1 on aggregate.

February 5, 2016	Defensores de Belgrano (VR)	1–2	La Emilia	Villa Ramallo, Pcia. de Buenos Aires
21:00	Coronel 54'	Report	Rodríguez 6'; Garavano 88'	Stadium: Salomón Boeseldín; Referee: Santiago Ascenzi

Defensores de Belgrano (VR) won 5–3 on aggregate.

February 5, 2016	Unión (S)	2–1	Unión Santiago	Sunchales, Pcia. de Santa Fe
21:15	Weissen 49'; Salvatierra 56'	Report	Avellaneda 90+1'	Stadium: La Fortaleza; Referee: José Sandoval

Unión (S) won 3–1 on aggregate.

February 14, 2016	San Martín (F)	3–0	Sportivo Guzmán	Formosa, Pcia. de Formosa
17:00	Jaime 21'; Gómez 68'; Gutiérrez 88'	Report		Stadium: Estadio 17 de Octubre; Referee: Guillermo González

San Martín (F) won 3–1 on aggregate.

February 14, 2016	San Martín (M)	2–1	Sportivo Rivadavia	San Martín, Pcia. de Mendoza
19:00	Villaseca 7'; Chiocarello 68' (pen.)	Report	Pierani 54'	Stadium: Gral. San Martín; Referee: Jonathan Correa

2–2 on aggregate. Sportivo Rivadavia won on away goals.

February 20, 2016	Deportivo Madryn	4–0	Germinal	Puerto Madryn, Pcia. de Chubut
17:00	Michelena 10', 23', 63'; Piñero Da Silva 21'	Report		Stadium: Coliseo del Golfo; Referee: Bruno Bocca

Deportivo Madryn won 5–0 on aggregate.

February 7, 2016	Cipolletti	0–1	Sansinena	Cipolletti, Pcia. de Río Negro
20:30		Report	Scalco 28'	Stadium: La Visera de Cemento; Referee: Esteban Nasier

Sansiena won 2–1 on aggregate.

=== Group B ===
In this round, 3 teams from the Torneo Federal A and 3 teams from the Torneo Federal B participated. The round was played between January 29 and February 17, on a home-and-away two-legged tie. The 3 winning teams advanced to the Final Round.

Team 1	Agg.	Team 2	1st leg	2nd leg
Güemes	5–3	Juventud Antoniana	4–1	1–2
Talleres (C)	4–2	Defensores (P)	1–0	3–2
Juventud Unida Universitario	2–2 (4–5 p)	Villa Mitre	0–2	2–0

==== First leg ====
January 29, 2016	Juventud Antoniana	1–4	Güemes	Salta, Pcia. de Salta
22:00	Balvorín 10'	Report	Díaz 15', 57'; Detona 28'; Castaño 43'	Stadium: Padre Ernesto Martearena; Referee: Nelson Sosa

February 3, 2016	Defensores (P)	0–1	Talleres (C)	Concepción del Uruguay, Pcia. de Entre Ríos
21:00		Report	Velázquez 85'	Stadium: Manuel y Ramón Núñez; Referee: David Ranciglio

February 10, 2016	Villa Mitre	2–0	Juventud Unida Universitario	Bahía Blanca, Pcia. de Buenos Aires
21:00	Dauwalder 57'; De Hoyos 90+1'	Report		Stadium: El Fortín; Referee: Federico Presa

==== Second leg ====
February 10, 2016	Güemes	1–2	Juventud Antoniana	Santiago del Estero, Pcia. de Santiago del Estero
22:00	Jara 31' (pen.)	Report	Cáceres 34'; Allende 49'	Stadium: Arturo Miranda; Referee: Fabricio Llobet

Güemes won 5–3 on aggregate.

February 16, 2016	Talleres (C)	3–2	Defensores (P)	Córdoba, Pcia. de Córdoba
21:00	Reynoso 13'; Solís 50'; Araujo 90+7'	Report	Robles 8', 22'	Stadium: Mario Alberto Kempes; Referee: Sebastián Mastrángelo

Talleres (C) won 4–2 on aggregate.

February 17, 2016	Juventud Unida Universitario	2–0 (4–5 p)	Villa Mitre	San Luis, Pcia. de San Luis
17:00	Córdoba 49'; Ciaccheri 90+1'	Report		Stadium: Mario Sebastián Diez; Referee: Alejandro Arco
	Penalties
	Ruiz (penalty missed); Fernández (penalty scored); Sainz (penalty scored); Ciaccheri (penalty missed); Córdoba (penalty scored); Passaglia (penalty scored); Cardozo (penalty missed)		(penalty scored) Zárate; (penalty missed) Sánchez; (penalty scored) Romero; (penalty missed) Formigo; (penalty scored) Cantoni; (penalty scored) Barez; (penalty scored) González

2–2 on aggregate. Villa Mitre won 5–4 on penalties.

== Final Round ==
=== Bracket ===
==== Upper bracket ====
Round of 64
River Plate	3
Sportivo Rivadavia	0
Temperley	1
Estudiantes (SL)	2
Atlético Tucumán	0
Defensores de Belgrano	1
Arsenal	2
Talleres (RdE)	1
Quilmes	2 (2)
Unión Aconquija (p)	2 (4)
Unión (p)	1 (4)
Atlético Paraná	1 (3)
Sarmiento	1
Los Andes	2
Estudiantes (LP)	3
Atlas	0
Racing Club	2
Gimnasia y Tiro	0
Olimpo	1 (3)
Gimnasia y Esgrima (J)	1 (1)
San Martín (SJ)	0
Instituto	1
Gimnasia y Esgrima (LP)	2
Deportivo Madryn	1
Banfield	1
Defensores de Belgrano (VR)	0
Godoy Cruz	2
Estudiantes (BA)	0
Tigre	0 (2)
Douglas Haig (p)	0 (4)
San Lorenzo	3
Unión (S)	1

Round of 32
River Plate	2
Estudiantes (SL)	1
Defensores de Belgrano	1
Arsenal	2
Unión Aconquija	1
Unión	3
Los Andes	0
Estudiantes (LP)	2
Racing Club	2
Olimpo	1
Instituto	0
Gimnasia y Esgrima (LP)	2
Banfield	0
Godoy Cruz	1
Douglas Haig	1
San Lorenzo	3

Round of 16
River Plate	1
Arsenal	0
Unión (p)	0 (5)
Estudiantes (LP)	0 (4)
Racing Club	0
Gimnasia y Esgrima (LP)	1
Godoy Cruz	1
San Lorenzo	3

Quarterfinals
River Plate	3
Unión	0
Gimnasia y Esgrima (LP)	2 (4)
San Lorenzo	2 (2)

Semifinals
River Plate	2
Gimnasia y Esgrima (LP)	0

==== Lower bracket ====
Round of 64
Independiente	2
San Telmo	1
Defensa y Justicia	2
Talleres (C)	0
Belgrano	1
Brown	0
Huracán	2
Central Córdoba (R)	1
Argentinos Juniors	1 (3)
Laferrere (p)	1 (4)
Colón	0
Almagro	1
Crucero del Norte	0 (1)
Juventud Unida (G) (p)	0 (3)
Vélez Sársfield	1
Sportivo Barracas	0
Newell's Old Boys	5
Sansinena	2
Aldosivi	0 (3)
Deportivo Morón (p)	0 (5)
Atlético de Rafaela	2 (3)
Ferro Carril Oeste	2 (2)
Rosario Central	1
Villa Mitre	0
Lanús (p)	1 (6)
San Martín (F)	1 (5)
Patronato (p)	0 (4)
Villa Dálmine	0 (2)
Nueva Chicago	0
Santamarina	2
Boca Juniors	4
Güemes	0

Round of 32
Independiente	0
Defensa y Justicia	1
Belgrano (p)	1 (5)
Huracán	1 (3)
Laferrere	1 (3)
Almagro (p)	1 (4)
Juventud Unida (G) (p)	1 (4)
Vélez Sársfield	1 (3)
Newell's Old Boys	0
Deportivo Morón	1
Atlético de Rafaela	2 (1)
Rosario Central (p)	2 (3)
Lanús	2
Patronato	0
Santamarina	1
Boca Juniors	2

Round of 16
Defensa y Justicia	1
Belgrano	2
Almagro	0
Juventud Unida (G)	2
Deportivo Morón	0
Rosario Central	2
Lanús	2 (2)
Boca Juniors (p)	2 (4)

Quarterfinals
Belgrano	2
Juventud Unida (G)	0
Rosario Central	2
Boca Juniors	1

Semifinals
Belgrano	0
Rosario Central	2

=== Round of 64 ===
This round had 11 qualified teams from the Regional Round, 11 qualified teams from the Metropolitan Zone (5 teams from Primera B Metro; 4 teams from Primera C and 2 teams from Primera D), 12 teams from Primera B Nacional and 30 teams from Primera División. The round was played between May 4 and July 31, in a single knock-out match format. The 32 winning teams advanced to the Round of 32. The draw took place on April 7, 2016.

July 31, 2016	River Plate	3–0	Sportivo Rivadavia	Formosa, Pcia. de Formosa
18:00	Alario 10'; Fernández 39'; Mercado 90' (pen.)	Report		Stadium: Estadio Antonio Romero; Referee: Pedro Argañaraz

June 29, 2016	Boca Juniors	4–0	Güemes	San Juan, Pcia. de San Juan
21:10	Pavón 0', 13'; Insaurralde 23'; Pérez 88'	Report		Stadium: Estadio del Bicentenario; Referee: Federico Beligoy

May 4, 2016	Independiente	2–1	San Telmo	Formosa, Pcia. de Formosa
22:00	Fernández 36'; Aquino 48'	Report	Oviedo 49'	Stadium: Estadio Antonio Romero; Referee: Pedro Argañaraz

July 30, 2016	San Lorenzo	3–1	Unión (S)	Salta, Pcia. de Salta
17:10	Blandi 34', 59'; Cauteruccio 56'	Report	Bauman 74'	Stadium: Estadio Padre Ernesto Martearena; Referee: Mariano González

May 25, 2016	Racing Club	2–0	Gimnasia y Tiro	Formosa, Pcia. de Formosa
18:40	Acuña 84'; López 90+2'	Report		Stadium: Estadio Antonio Romero; Referee: Alejandro Castro

May 11, 2016	Vélez Sársfield	1–0	Sportivo Barracas	Formosa, Pcia. de Formosa
21:10	Pavone 5'	Report		Stadium: Estadio Antonio Romero; Referee: Ramón Guaymas

May 12, 2016	Newell's Old Boys	5–2	Sansinena	Junín, Pcia. de Buenos Aires
19:30	Rodríguez 5', 14', 59'; Scocco 61'; Fértoli 66'	Report	Scalco 7'; Linares 87'	Stadium: Estadio Eva Perón; Referee: Fernando Echenique

July 16, 2016	Estudiantes (LP)	3–0	Atlas	Salta, Pcia. de Salta
17:10	Marchioni 4'; Sánchez 61'; Graciani 83'	Report		Stadium: Estadio Padre Ernesto Martearena; Referee: Ramón Guaymas

July 22, 2016	Quilmes	2–2 (2–4 p)	Unión Aconquija	San Juan, Pcia. de San Juan
20:00	Orihuela 27'; García 47'	Report	Villalba Fretes 78' (pen.); Ledesma 81'	Stadium: Estadio del Bicentenario; Referee: Saúl Laverni
	Penalties
	Bottino (penalty scored); Marinucci (penalty scored); Ramírez (penalty missed); Da Campo (penalty missed)		(penalty scored) Villalba Fretes; (penalty scored) Cabral; (penalty missed) Farías; (penalty scored) Marcolini; (penalty scored) Ledesma

July 15, 2016	Rosario Central	1–0	Villa Mitre	Junín, Pcia. de Buenos Aires
17:30	Burgos 75'	Report		Stadium: Estadio Eva Perón; Referee: Fernando Echenique

July 27, 2016	Argentinos Juniors	1–1 (3–4 p)	Laferrere	Turdera, Pcia. de Buenos Aires
18:00	Romero 0'	Report	Bustos 43'	Stadium: Estadio Alfredo Beranger; Referee: Héctor Paletta
	Penalties
	Lenci (penalty missed); Piovi (penalty scored); Torrén (penalty scored); Freire (penalty scored); Romero (penalty missed)		(penalty scored) Martínez; (penalty scored) Bustos; (penalty scored) Fernández; (penalty scored) Randulfe

May 18, 2016	Gimnasia y Esgrima (LP)	2–1	Deportivo Madryn	Sarandí, Pcia. de Buenos Aires
19:10	Mansilla 37' (o.g.); Contín 51'	Report	Michelena 14'	Stadium: Estadio Julio Humberto Grondona; Referee: Diego Ceballos

May 26, 2016	Banfield	1–0	Defensores de Belgrano (VR)	Sarandí, Pcia. de Buenos Aires
21:10	Bettini 90'	Report		Stadium: Estadio Julio Humberto Grondona; Referee: Juan Pablo Pompei

July 18, 2016	Huracán	2–1	Central Córdoba (R)	Banfield, Pcia. de Buenos Aires
21:10	Kaku 23'; Bogado 70' (pen.)	Report	Figueroa 34'	Stadium: Estadio Florencio Sola; Referee: Luis Alvarez

July 19, 2016	Lanús	1–1 (6–5 p)	San Martín (F)	Formosa, Pcia. de Formosa
21:10	Ayala 75'	Report	Velázquez 90'	Stadium: Estadio Antonio Romero; Referee: Sergio Pezzotta
	Penalties
	Sand (penalty scored); Pasquini (penalty scored); Martínez (penalty scored); Ayala (penalty scored); Acosta (penalty missed); Braghieri (penalty scored); Marcone (penalty missed); Almirón (penalty scored)		(penalty scored) Gutiérrez; (penalty scored) Giménez; (penalty scored) Asatt; (penalty missed) Salazar; (penalty scored) Larrosa; (penalty scored) Álvarez; (penalty missed) Torales; (penalty missed) Velázquez

May 26, 2016	Arsenal	2–1	Talleres (RdE)	Turdera, Pcia. de Buenos Aires
15:40	Bellocq 9'; Carrera 90+2'	Report	Ortiz 5'	Stadium: Estadio Alfredo Beranger; Referee: Ariel Penel

July 10, 2016	Atlético Tucumán	0–1	Defensores de Belgrano	Salta, Pcia. de Salta
17:10		Report	Sbuttoni 36' (o.g.)	Stadium: Estadio Padre Ernesto Martearena; Referee: Andrés Merlos

July 21, 2016	Patronato	0–0 (4–2 p)	Villa Dálmine	Junín, Pcia. de Buenos Aires
21:10		Report		Stadium: Estadio Eva Perón; Referee: Facundo Tello
	Penalties
	Quiroga (penalty scored); Telechea (penalty scored); Bértoli (penalty scored); González (penalty scored)		(penalty scored) Alonso; (penalty missed) Cérica; (penalty missed) Luna; (penalty scored) De Maio

July 27, 2016	Belgrano	1–0	Brown	Córdoba, Pcia. de Córdoba
21:10	Velázquez 90+2'	Report		Stadium: Estadio Mario Alberto Kempes; Referee: Federico Beligoy

July 19, 2016	Godoy Cruz	2–0	Estudiantes (BA)	Sarandí, Pcia. de Buenos Aires
17:10	Alvarado 5'; Henriquez 71'	Report		Stadium: Estadio Julio Humberto Grondona; Referee: Ramiro López

May 18, 2016	San Martín (SJ)	0–1	Instituto	San Juan, Pcia. de San Juan
22:00		Report	Panichelli 23'	Stadium: Estadio del Bicentenario; Referee: Pablo Díaz

May 4, 2016	Colón	0–1	Almagro	Sarandí, Pcia. de Buenos Aires
15:30		Report	Altamirano 51'	Stadium: Estadio Julio Humberto Grondona; Referee: Héctor Paletta

June 2, 2016	Atlético de Rafaela	2–2 (3–2 p)	Ferro Carril Oeste	Turdera, Pcia. de Buenos Aires
19:00	Anselmo 85'; Colombo 90'	Report	Vizcarra 43', 64'	Stadium: Estadio Alfredo Beranger; Referee: Ariel Suárez
	Penalties
	Anselmo (penalty scored); Borgnino (penalty scored); Serrano (penalty missed); Colombo (penalty scored)		(penalty missed) Vera; (penalty scored) Izco; (penalty missed) Vizcarra; (penalty scored) Navarro; (penalty missed) Alderete

May 17, 2016	Unión	1–1 (4–3 p)	Atlético Paraná	Rafaela, Pcia. de Santa Fe
21:10	Malcorra 24' (pen.)	Report	Alzugaray 54'	Stadium: Estadio Nuevo Monumental; Referee: Ariel Penel
	Penalties
	Malcorra (penalty scored); Martínez (penalty scored); Nagüel (penalty scored); Rodríguez (penalty scored)		(penalty scored) Cadenazzi; (penalty scored) Lencioni; (penalty missed) Galli; (penalty scored) Alzugaray; (penalty missed) Machado

July 25, 2016	Sarmiento (J)	1–2	Los Andes	Sarandí, Pcia. de Buenos Aires
18:00	Fornari 64'	Report	Linas 8'; García 88'	Stadium: Estadio Julio Humberto Grondona; Referee: Ariel Penel

May 5, 2016	Aldosivi	0–0 (3–5 p)	Deportivo Morón	Turdera, Pcia. de Buenos Aires
15:30		Report		Stadium: Estadio Alfredo Beranger; Referee: Héctor Paletta
	Penalties
	Díaz (penalty scored); Lamberti (penalty missed); Llama (penalty scored); Galván (penalty scored)		(penalty scored) Giménez; (penalty scored) Martínez; (penalty scored) Toledo; (penalty scored) Mendieta; (penalty scored) Yassogna

June 23, 2016	Crucero del Norte	0–0 (1–3 p)	Juventud Unida (G)	Sarandí, Pcia. de Buenos Aires
19:10		Report		Stadium: Estadio Julio Humberto Grondona; Referee: Mariano González
	Penalties
	Castro (penalty missed); Olivares (penalty missed); Coria (penalty scored); Pedrozo (penalty missed)		(penalty missed) Menseguez; (penalty scored) Barrado; (penalty scored) Lenci; (penalty scored) Castellano

June 1, 2016	Olimpo	1–1 (3–1 p)	Gimnasia y Esgrima (J)	Sarandí, Pcia. de Buenos Aires
15:40	Pizzini 36'	Report	Vila 50'	Stadium: Estadio Julio Humberto Grondona; Referee: Saúl Laverni
	Penalties
	Moiraghi (penalty missed); Blanco (penalty scored); Vega (penalty scored); Figal (penalty scored)		(penalty missed) Correa; (penalty missed) Noriega; (penalty scored) Ferreyra; (penalty missed) Maldonado

May 25, 2016	Tigre	0–0 (2–4 p)	Douglas Haig	Banfield, Pcia. de Buenos Aires
15:40		Report		Stadium: Estadio Florencio Sola; Referee: Pablo Díaz
	Penalties
	Rodríguez (penalty missed); Luna (penalty scored); García (penalty missed); Godoy (penalty scored)		(penalty scored) Grazzini; (penalty scored) Martín; (penalty scored) Cabral; (penalty scored) Boló

June 1, 2016	Defensa y Justicia	2–0	Talleres (C)	Banfield, Pcia. de Buenos Aires
20:00	Isnaldo 17', 22'	Report		Stadium: Estadio Florencio Sola; Referee: Facundo Tello

July 29, 2016	Nueva Chicago	0–2	Santamarina	Banfield, Pcia. de Buenos Aires
17:00		Report	Michel 31'; Aguirre Schmidt 51'	Stadium: Estadio Florencio Sola; Referee: Nicolás Lamolina

May 10, 2016	Temperley	1–2	Estudiantes (SL)	San Juan, Pcia. de San Juan
21:10	Cólzera 59'	Report	Moreira Aldana 84', 88'	Stadium: Estadio del Bicentenario; Referee: Mario Ejarque

=== Round of 32 ===
This round had the 32 qualified teams from the Round of 64. The round was played between August 2 and August 31, in a single knock-out match format. The 16 winning teams advanced to the Round of 16.

August 7, 2016	River Plate	2–1	Estudiantes (SL)	Salta, Pcia. de Salta
20:10	Fernández 34'; Martínez 89'	Report	Mosset 87'	Stadium: Estadio Padre Ernesto Martearena; Referee: Fernando Rapallini

August 11, 2016	Defensores de Belgrano	1–2	Arsenal	Turdera, Pcia. de Buenos Aires
20:10	Buono 51'	Report	Corvalán 34'; Fragapane 76'	Stadium: Estadio Alfredo Beranger; Referee: Ariel Suárez

August 12, 2016	Unión Aconquija	1–3	Unión	Paraná, Pcia. de Entre Ríos
19:30	Martínez 45'	Report	Brítez 63'; Gamba 66'; Acevedo 90+2'	Stadium: Estadio Presbítero Bartolomé Grella; Referee: Pablo Díaz

August 13, 2016	Los Andes	0–2	Estudiantes (LP)	Lanús, Pcia. de Buenos Aires
16:10		Report	Viatri 42'; Rodríguez 89'	Stadium: Estadio Ciudad de Lanús; Referee: Ariel Penel

August 23, 2016	Racing Club	2–1	Olimpo	Salta, Pcia. de Salta
21:10	López 7' (pen.); Insúa 39'	Report	Coniglio 90+3'	Stadium: Estadio Padre Ernesto Martearena; Referee: Fernando Echenique

August 17, 2016	Instituto	0–2	Gimnasia y Esgrima (LP)	San Juan, Pcia. de San Juan
21:10		Report	Vegetti 21'; Carrera 70'	Stadium: Estadio del Bicentenario; Referee: Andrés Merlos

August 7, 2016	Banfield	0–1	Godoy Cruz	Sarandí, Pcia. de Buenos Aires
13:45		Report	Silva 86'	Stadium: Estadio Julio Humberto Grondona; Referee: Nicolás Lamolina

August 7, 2016	Douglas Haig	1–3	San Lorenzo	Formosa, Pcia. de Formosa
16:00	Bazán 32'	Report	Blandi 26'; Caruzzo 64'; Angeleri 78'	Stadium: Estadio Antonio Romero; Referee: Juan Pablo Pompei

August 8, 2016	Independiente	0–1	Defensa y Justicia	Banfield, Pcia. de Buenos Aires
20:10		Report	Ríos 55'	Stadium: Estadio Florencio Sola; Referee: Darío Herrera

August 12, 2016	Belgrano	1–1 (5–3 p)	Huracán	San Juan, Pcia. de San Juan
22:10	Aveldaño 19'	Report	Bogado 22' (pen.)	Stadium: Estadio del Bicentenario; Referee: Fernando Espinoza
	Penalties
	Suárez (penalty scored); Pereyra (penalty scored); Álvarez Suárez (penalty scored); Lema (penalty scored); Álvarez (penalty scored)		(penalty missed) Nervo; (penalty scored) Mancinelli; (penalty scored) Mendoza; (penalty scored) Pusetto

August 31, 2016	Laferrere	1–1 (3–4 p)	Almagro	Sarandí, Pcia. de Buenos Aires
15:30	Lezcano 67'	Report	Altamirano 78'	Stadium: Estadio Julio Humberto Grondona; Referee: Diego Ceballos
	Penalties
	Martínez (penalty missed); Bustos (penalty missed); Fernández (penalty scored); Mallemaci (penalty scored); Tello (penalty scored); Mazacotte (penalty missed)		(penalty scored) Barbosa; (penalty missed) Grahl; (penalty scored) Ronconi; (penalty missed) Martínez; (penalty scored) Altamirano; (penalty scored) Luciatti

August 16, 2016	Juventud Unida (G)	1–1 (4–3 p)	Vélez Sársfield	Sarandí, Pcia. de Buenos Aires
18:10	Villalba 88'	Report	Pavone 82'	Stadium: Estadio Julio Humberto Grondona; Referee: Héctor Paletta
	Penalties
	Villalba (penalty scored); Barrado (penalty scored); Blanco (penalty scored); Menseguez (penalty missed); Ramírez (penalty scored)		(penalty missed) Aguerre; (penalty scored) Somoza; (penalty scored) Caire; (penalty scored) Nasuti; (penalty missed) Pavone

August 10, 2016	Newell's Old Boys	0–1	Deportivo Morón	Lanús, Pcia. de Buenos Aires
20:10		Report	Minici 71'	Stadium: Estadio Ciudad de Lanús; Referee: Mario Ejarque

August 31, 2016	Atlético de Rafaela	2–2 (1–3 p)	Rosario Central	Santa Fe, Pcia. de Santa Fe
19:30	Ramírez 10'; Abero 36'	Report	Bordagaray 1'; Herrera 52'	Stadium: Estadio 15 de Abril; Referee: Andrés Merlos
	Penalties
	Borgnino (penalty scored); Morales (penalty missed); Abero (penalty missed); Paredes (penalty missed)		(penalty scored) Musto; (penalty scored) Herrera; (penalty missed) Lo Celso; (penalty scored) Burgos

August 2, 2016	Lanús	2–0	Patronato	Sarandí, Pcia. de Buenos Aires
18:10	Aguirre 82'; Sand 90+2'	Report		Stadium: Estadio Julio Humberto Grondona; Referee: Fernando Echenique

August 22, 2016	Santamarina	1–2	Boca Juniors	Formosa, Pcia. de Formosa
	Michel 71'	Report	Benedetto 17'; Pavón 77'	Stadium: Estadio Antonio Romero; Referee: Silvio Trucco

=== Round of 16 ===
This round had the 16 qualified teams from the Round of 32. The round was played between September 3 and October 19, in a single knock-out match format. The 8 winning teams advanced to the Quarterfinals.

September 22, 2016	River Plate	1–0	Arsenal	San Juan, Pcia. de San Juan
20:30	Alario 52'	Report		Stadium: Estadio del Bicentenario; Referee: Patricio Loustau

September 3, 2016	Unión	0–0 (5–4 p)	Estudiantes (LP)	Sarandí, Pcia. de Buenos Aires
16:10		Report		Stadium: Estadio Julio Humberto Grondona; Referee: Juan Pablo Pompei
	Penalties
	Acevedo (penalty scored); Carando (penalty scored); Godoy (penalty missed); Vadalá (penalty scored); Brítez (penalty scored); Gamba (penalty scored)		(penalty scored) Schunke; (penalty scored) Aguirregaray; (penalty scored) Damonte; (penalty missed) Bailone; (penalty scored) Vargas; (penalty missed) Graciani

October 19, 2016	Racing Club	0–1	Gimnasia y Esgrima (LP)	Lanús, Pcia. de Buenos Aires
21:10		Report	Imperiale 49'	Stadium: Estadio Ciudad de Lanús; Referee: Diego Abal

October 12, 2016	Godoy Cruz	1–3	San Lorenzo	Lanús, Pcia. de Buenos Aires
21:10	González 23'	Report	Cauteruccio 12'; Blanco 22'; Belluschi 56'	Stadium: Estadio Ciudad de Lanús; Referee: Juan Pablo Pompei

September 3, 2016	Defensa y Justicia	1–2	Belgrano	San Juan, Pcia. de San Juan
20:10	Kaprof 31'	Report	Bieler 6' (pen.); Álvarez Suárez 77'	Stadium: Estadio del Bicentenario; Referee: Fernando Echenique

September 14, 2016	Almagro	0–2	Juventud Unida (G)	Formosa, Pcia. de Formosa
21:10		Report	Blanco 53'; Pereyra 84'	Stadium: Estadio Antonio Romero; Referee: Nicolás Lamolina

September 20, 2016	Deportivo Morón	0–2	Rosario Central	Salta, Pcia. de Salta
21:10		Report	Montoya 53'; Ruben 90+3'	Stadium: Estadio Padre Ernesto Martearena; Referee: Silvio Trucco

September 28, 2016	Lanús	2–2 (2–4 p)	Boca Juniors	Mar del Plata, Pcia. de Buenos Aires
21:10	Martínez 4'; Braghieri 59'	Report	Tevez 50', 64'	Stadium: José María Minella; Referee: Darío Herrera
	Penalties
	Martínez (penalty scored); Pasquini (penalty missed); Braghieri (penalty missed); Marcone (penalty scored)		(penalty scored) Tevez; (penalty scored) Pavón; (penalty scored) Benedetto; (penalty scored) Vergini

=== Quarterfinals ===
This round had the 8 qualified teams from the Round of 16. The round was played between October 5 and November 17, in a single knock-out match format. The 4 winning teams advanced to the Semifinals.

October 27, 2016	River Plate	3–0	Unión	Mar del Plata, Pcia. de Buenos Aires
21:10	Driussi 5'; Arzura 73'; Alario 90+3'	Report		Stadium: José María Minella; Referee: Federico Beligoy

November 17, 2016	Gimnasia y Esgrima (LP)	2–2 (4–2 p)	San Lorenzo	Salta, Pcia. de Salta
21:10	Ibáñez 2'; Carrera 52'	Report	Blanco 54'; Díaz 60'	Stadium: Estadio Padre Ernesto Martearena; Referee: Néstor Pitana
	Penalties
	Licht (penalty scored); Lobos (penalty scored); Carrera (penalty scored); Guanini (penalty scored)		(penalty missed) Angeleri; (penalty scored) Belluschi; (penalty missed) Cauteruccio; (penalty scored) Caruzzo

October 5, 2016	Belgrano	2–0	Juventud Unida (G)	Lanús, Pcia. de Buenos Aires
21:10	Bieler 68' (pen.); Bolatti 74'	Report		Stadium: Estadio Ciudad de Lanús; Referee: Juan Pablo Pompei

November 2, 2016	Rosario Central	2–1	Boca Juniors	Córdoba, Pcia. de Córdoba
21:10	Fernández 37'; Herrera 41'	Report	Benedetto 90+5'	Stadium: Estadio Mario Alberto Kempes; Referee: Patricio Loustau

=== Semifinals ===
This round had the 4 qualified teams from the Quarterfinals. The round was played between November 30 and December 1, in a single knock-out match format. The 2 winning teams advanced to the Final.

December 1, 2016	River Plate	2–0	Gimnasia y Esgrima (LP)	San Juan, Pcia. de San Juan
21:10	Driussi 40'; Alario 44'	Report		Stadium: Estadio del Bicentenario; Referee: Darío Herrera

November 30, 2016	Belgrano	0–2	Rosario Central	Formosa, Pcia. de Formosa
21:10		Report	Ruben 72'; Montoya 90+2'	Stadium: Estadio Antonio Romero; Referee: Jorge Baliño

== Final ==
December 15, 2016
21:10

River Plate	4–3	Rosario Central
Alario 11' (pen.), 40' (pen.), 72'; Alonso 75'	Report	Musto 26'; Ruben 30', 63'

Estadio Mario Alberto Kempes, Córdoba
Referee: Patricio Loustau

== Top goalscorers ==
Rank	Player	Club	Goals
1	(Argentina) Lucas Alario	River Plate	7
2	(Argentina) José Antonio Michelena	Deportivo Madryn	4
2	(Argentina) Marco Ruben	Rosario Central	4
2	(Argentina) Maxi Rodríguez	Newell's Old Boys	3
2	(Argentina) Nicolás Blandi	San Lorenzo	3
2	(Argentina) Cristian Pavón	Boca Juniors	3
2	(Argentina) Diego Martínez	Unión Aconquija	3
2	(Argentina) Ramiro Carrera	Gimnasia y Esgrima (LP)	3
