= 2019–20 Unión de Santa Fe season =

Unión Santa Fe
2019–20 season
- President: Luis Spahn
- Manager: Leonardo Madelón
- Stadium: Estadio 15 de Abril
- Top goalscorer: League: Yeimar Gómez Andrade (2); All: Yeimar Gómez (2)

The 2019–20 season was Unión Santa Fe's 6th consecutive season in the top division of Argentine football. In addition to the Primera División, the club competed in the Copa Argentina, Copa de la Superliga and Copa Sudamericana.

The season generally covers the period from 1 July 2019 to 30 June 2020.

== Review ==
=== Pre-season ===
On 20 June 2019, Unión Santa Fe announced that a deal, subject to personal terms and medicals, had been agreed for the transfers of Emanuel Brítez and Diego Zabala to Rosario Central. A day later, a similar agreement was reached with San Lorenzo for the sales of Bruno and Mauro Pittón. The departures of Brítez and Zabala were completed on 21 June, with the previously mentioned brothers following suit on 22 June. After four outgoings, Unión revealed their first incoming on 25 June in goalkeeper Sebastián Moyano from La Plata's Gimnasia y Esgrima. Jonatan Fleita's loan deal with Nueva Chicago was extended for a further season on 25 June. On 28 June, Unión communicated that they had earned $6.125m from the sales of Brítez, Zabala and the Pittón brothers.

Ezequiel Bonifacio joined the club on 29 June, signing from Gimnasia y Esgrima; à la Moyano. A fifth player left on 30 June, as Franco Fragapane went to Talleres. Numerous loans from the previous campaign officially expired on and around 30 June. Franco Troyansky converted a penalty as Unión beat Godoy Cruz in a pre-season friendly on 3 July, though lost the secondary encounter by two goals. Damián Martínez, who spent the last two campaigns on loan from Independiente, was signed permanently on 3 July. A transaction with Patronato for Gabriel Carabajal was confirmed on 4 July, with the right midfielder penning a three-year contract. Joaquín Papaleo was loaned, for a career third time, to Santamarina. Unión beat Cosmos FC in friendlies on 10 July.

Right midfielder Santiago Lebus headed off to All Boys on 10 July, a day prior to Federico Andrada's exit to Aldosivi. No goals were scored in two exhibition matches between Unión and Rosario Central on 13 July. Veteran goalkeeper Nereo Fernández switched Unión for Atlético de Rafaela on 16 July. Jalil Elías arrived on loan from Newell's Old Boys on 17 July. Federico Milo became their sixth reinforcement for the new campaign, as he was loaned from Arsenal de Sarandí. Boca Juniors's Walter Bou penned a loan contract with Unión on 23 July.

=== July ===
Unión Santa Fe travelled to reigning champions Racing Club on matchday one of their league campaign, subsequently securing a goalless draw on 26 July. Juan Cavallaro made a move from recently relegated Tigre on 30 July.

=== August ===
On 2 August, Matías García signed for Chacarita Juniors. Goals from Walter Bou and Yeimar Gómez Andrade secured Unión victory in game two, on 4 August, in the Primera División over Defensa y Justicia. Unión played Sarmiento in friendlies on 9 August, with a 1–1 draw preceding a 0–1 loss. Facundo Britos became a new player of Atlético de Rafaela on 12 August. After a draw and a win in the Primera División, Unión experienced their first league loss on 17 August to Newell's Old Boys. Another defeat arrived a week later, as Lanús condemned them to a 1–2 scoreline. Unión lost again on 31 August, this time to San Lorenzo after a winning goal from ex-player Bruno Pittón.

== Squad ==
Squad No.	Nationality	Name	Position(s)	Date of birth (age)	Signed from
Goalkeepers
1	Argentina	Marcos Peano	GK	15 October 1998 (age 28)	Academy
13	Argentina	Alan Sosa	GK	27 April 1996 (age 30)	Academy
25	Argentina	Sebastián Moyano	GK	26 August 1990 (age 36)	Gimnasia y Esgrima
	Argentina	Ignacio Arce	GK	8 April 1992 (age 34)	Academy
	Uruguay	Matías Castro	GK	24 October 1987 (age 39)	Liverpool
Defenders
2	Argentina	Franco Calderón	CB	13 May 1998 (age 28)	Academy
3	Argentina	Claudio Corvalán	LB	23 March 1989 (age 37)	Arsenal de Sarandí
4	Argentina	Damián Martínez	RB	31 January 1990 (age 36)	Independiente
6	Argentina	Jonathan Bottinelli	CB	14 September 1984 (age 42)	Arsenal de Sarandí
14	Argentina	Federico Milo	LB	10 January 1992 (age 34)	Arsenal de Sarandí (loan)
17	Argentina	Brian Blasi	CB	8 February 1996 (age 30)	Academy
19	Argentina	Ezequiel Bonifacio	RB	9 May 1994 (age 32)	Gimnasia y Esgrima
26	Argentina	Federico Vera	LB	24 March 1998 (age 28)	Academy
28	Colombia	Yeimar Gómez Andrade	CB	30 June 1992 (age 34)	Independiente Rivadavia
Midfielders
5	Argentina	Nelson Acevedo	LM	11 July 1988 (age 38)	Racing Club (loan)
8	Argentina	Lucas Ríos	RM	8 March 1998 (age 28)	Academy
10	Argentina	Gabriel Carabajal	RM	9 December 1991 (age 34)	Patronato
11	Argentina	Jalil Elías	CM	25 April 1996 (age 30)	Newell's Old Boys (loan)
15	Argentina	Juan Cavallaro	AM	28 June 1994 (age 32)	Tigre
18	Argentina	Darío Bottinelli	AM	26 December 1986 (age 39)	Audax Italiano
20	Argentina	Gastón González	MF	27 June 2001 (age 25)	Academy
21	Argentina	Gastón Comas	MF	13 June 1998 (age 28)	Academy
23	Argentina	Manuel de Iriondo	CM	6 May 1993 (age 33)	Atlético de Rafaela
24	Argentina	Franco Godoy	MF	28 June 2000 (age 26)	Academy
27	Uruguay	Javier Méndez	DM	5 December 1994 (age 31)	Racing Club
29	Argentina	Braian Álvarez	LM	22 August 1997 (age 29)	Racing Club (loan)
30	Argentina	Juan Ignacio Nardoni	MF	14 July 2002 (age 24)	Academy
	Argentina	Claudio Aquino	AM	24 July 1991 (age 35)	Independiente
	Argentina	Imanol Machuca	MF	15 January 2000 (age 26)	Academy
Forwards
7	Argentina	Pablo Cuadra	CF	6 June 1995 (age 31)	Racing Club (loan)
9	Argentina	Walter Bou	CF	25 August 1993 (age 33)	Boca Juniors (loan)
12	Argentina	Nicolás Mazzola	CF	28 January 1990 (age 36)	Gimnasia y Esgrima
22	Argentina	Franco Troyansky	CF	6 March 1997 (age 29)	Olimpo
	Argentina	Nicolás Andereggen	CF	22 February 1999 (age 27)	Academy
	Argentina	Federico Anselmo	CF	17 April 1994 (age 32)	Estudiantes
	Argentina	Rodrigo Cabalucci	LW	22 July 1992 (age 34)	Olimpo
	Argentina	Matías Gallegos	CF	15 May 1997 (age 29)	Academy
Out on loan					Loaned to
	Argentina	Jonatan Fleita	CB	20 January 1995 (age 31)	Nueva Chicago
	Argentina	Mariano Gómez	CB	5 February 1999 (age 27)	Ibiza
	Argentina	Joaquín Papaleo	GK	23 March 1994 (age 32)	Santamarina

== Transfers ==
Domestic transfer windows:
3 July 2019 to 24 September 2019
20 January 2020 to 19 February 2020.

=== Transfers in ===
Date from	Position	Nationality	Name	From	Ref.
3 July 2019 (Note: Deal agreed on 25 June 2019)	GK	Argentina	Sebastián Moyano	Gimnasia y Esgrima	
3 July 2019 (Note: Deal agreed on 29 June 2019)	RB	Argentina	Ezequiel Bonifacio	Gimnasia y Esgrima	
3 July 2019	RB	Argentina	Damián Martínez	Independiente	
4 July 2019	RM	Argentina	Gabriel Carabajal	Patronato	
30 July 2019	AM	Argentina	Juan Cavallaro	Tigre	

=== Transfers out ===
Date from	Position	Nationality	Name	To	Ref.
3 July 2019 (Note: Deal agreed on 21 June 2019)	RB	Argentina	Emanuel Brítez	Rosario Central	
3 July 2019 (Note: Deal agreed on 21 June 2019)	RW	Uruguay	Diego Zabala	Rosario Central	
3 July 2019 (Note: Deal agreed on 22 June 2019)	LB	Argentina	Bruno Pittón	San Lorenzo	
3 July 2019 (Note: Deal agreed on 22 June 2019)	DM	Argentina	Mauro Pittón	San Lorenzo	
3 July 2019 (Note: Deal agreed on 30 June 2019)	CF	Argentina	Franco Fragapane	Talleres	
10 July 2019	RM	Argentina	Santiago Lebus	All Boys	
11 July 2019	CF	Argentina	Federico Andrada	Aldosivi	
16 July 2019	GK	Argentina	Nereo Fernández	Atlético de Rafaela	
2 August 2019	GK	Argentina	Matías García	Chacarita Juniors	
2 August 2019	CM	Argentina	Facundo Britos	Atlético de Rafaela	

=== Loans in ===
Start date	Position	Nationality	Name	From	End date	Ref.
17 July 2019	CM	Argentina	Jalil Elías	Newell's Old Boys	30 June 2020	
19 July 2019	LB	Argentina	Federico Milo	Arsenal de Sarandí	30 June 2020	
23 July 2019	CF	Argentina	Walter Bou	Boca Juniors	30 June 2020	

=== Loans out ===
Start date	Position	Nationality	Name	To	End date	Ref.
7 July 2019	GK	Argentina	Joaquín Papaleo	Santamarina	30 June 2020	

== Friendlies ==
=== Pre-season ===
Unión Santa Fe, on 14 June 2019, revealed friendly matches with Godoy Cruz and Rosario Central that were set for 3 July and 13 July respectively. They'd also meet local Santa Fe team Cosmos FC on 10 July.

Win Draw Loss

3 July 2019 Friendly	Unión Santa Fe	1–0	Godoy Cruz	Santa Fe, Argentina
	F. Troyansky (pen.)	Unión Santa Fe; 70 min. match		Stadium: Estadio 15 de Abril

3 July 2019 Friendly	Unión Santa Fe	0–2	Godoy Cruz	Santa Fe, Argentina
		Unión Santa Fe; 70 min. match	M. Merentiel; J. Mateo	Stadium: Estadio 15 de Abril

10 July 2019 Friendly	Unión Santa Fe	1–0	Cosmos FC	Santa Fe, Argentina
	C. Peralta	Unión Santa Fe; Aire de Santa Fe		Stadium: Casasol

10 July 2019 Friendly	Unión Santa Fe	2–0	Cosmos FC	Santa Fe, Argentina
	L. Bucca; I. Machuca	Aire de Santa Fe		Stadium: Casasol

13 July 2019 Friendly	Rosario Central	0–0	Unión Santa Fe	Rosario, Argentina
		Unión Santa Fe; Olé; 70 min. match		Stadium: Estadio Gigante de Arroyito; Referee: Nazareno Arasa (Argentina)

13 July 2019 Friendly	Rosario Central	0–0	Unión Santa Fe	Rosario, Argentina
		Rosario Central; Olé; 60 min. match		Stadium: Estadio Gigante de Arroyito

=== Mid-season ===
Unión Santa Fe held exhibition games with Sarmiento on 9 August.

Win Draw Loss

9 August 2019 Friendly	Unión Santa Fe	1–1	Sarmiento	Santa Fe, Argentina
10:00 GMT-3	W. Bou (pen.)	Unión Santa Fe; Vía País	P. Magnín	Stadium: Estadio 15 de Abril

9 August 2019 Friendly	Unión Santa Fe	0–1	Sarmiento	Santa Fe, Argentina
		Unión Santa Fe; Vía País	F. Núñez	Stadium: Estadio 15 de Abril

== Competitions ==
=== Primera División ===
==== League table ====
Pos	Team	Pld	W	D	L	GF	GA	GD	Pts
14	Independiente	23	8	5	10	27	25	+2	29
15	Atlético Tucumán	23	7	8	8	22	25	−3	29
16	Unión	23	7	6	10	21	30	−9	27
17	Banfield	23	6	8	9	19	23	−4	26
18	Central Córdoba (SdE)	23	6	8	9	21	29	−8	26

Source: AFA
Rules for classification: 1) points; 2) play-off (only if needed to decide championship); 3) goal difference; 4) goals scored; 5) head-to-head points; 6) head-to-head goal difference; 7) head-to-head goals scored.

==== Relegation table ====
Pos	Team	2017–18 Pts	2018–19 Pts	2019–20 Pts	Total Pts	Total Pld	Avg	Relegation
11	Vélez Sarsfield	38	40	7	85	57	1.491	
12	Atlético Tucumán	36	42	6	84	57	1.474	
13	Unión	43	36	4	83	57	1.456	
14	Lanús	29	34	10	73	57	1.281	
15	Argentinos Juniors	41	22	9	72	57	1.263	

Source: AFA

==== Results summary ====
Overall								Home						Away					
Pld	W	D	L	GF	GA	GD	Pts	W	D	L	GF	GA	GD	W	D	L	GF	GA	GD
5	1	1	3	4	7	−3	4	1	0	1	3	3	0	0	1	2	1	4	−3

Last updated: 31 August 2019.
Source: Soccerway

==== Matches ====
The fixtures for the 2019–20 campaign were released on 10 July.

Win Draw Loss

26 July 2019 1	Racing Club	0–0	Unión Santa Fe	Avellaneda, Argentina
21:00 GMT-3		Unión Santa Fe; Infobae; Soccerway		Stadium: El Cilindro; Referee: Nicolás Lamolina (Argentina)

4 August 2019 2	Unión Santa Fe	2–1	Defensa y Justicia	Santa Fe, Argentina
11:00 GMT-3	W. Bou 33'; Y. Gómez 56'	Unión Santa Fe; Infobae; Soccerway	F. Márquez 47'	Stadium: Estadio 15 de Abril; Referee: Darío Herrera (Argentina)

17 August 2019 3	Newell's Old Boys	2–0	Unión Santa Fe	Rosario, Argentina
15:30 GMT-3	F. Nadalín 57'; L. Albertengo 83'	Unión Santa Fe; Infobae; Soccerway		Stadium: Estadio Marcelo Bielsa; Referee: Ariel Penel (Argentina)

25 August 2019 4	Unión Santa Fe	1–2	Lanús	Santa Fe, Argentina
13:15 GMT-3	Y. Gómez 74'	Unión Santa Fe; Infobae; Soccerway	C. Auzqui 28'; L. Acosta 58'	Stadium: Estadio 15 de Abril; Referee: Fernando Espinoza (Argentina)

31 August 2019 5	San Lorenzo	2–1	Unión Santa Fe	Buenos Aires, Argentina
15:30 GMT-3	Á. Romero 3'; B. Pittón 20'	Unión Santa Fe; Infobae; Soccerway	E. Bonifacio 38'	Stadium: Estadio Pedro Bidegain; Referee: Nicolás Lamolina (Argentina)

6	Arsenal de Sarandí	–	Unión Santa Fe	Sarandí, Argentina
				Stadium: Estadio Julio Humberto Grondona

=== Copa Argentina ===
Win Draw Loss

	–
00:00 GMT-3

=== Copa de la Superliga ===
Win Draw Loss

	–
00:00 GMT-3

=== Copa Sudamericana ===
Win Draw Loss

	–
00:00 GMT-3

== Squad statistics ==
=== Appearances and goals ===
No.	Pos.	Nationality	Name	League		Cup		League Cup		Continental		Total		Discipline		Ref
No.	Pos.	Nationality	Name	Apps	Goals	Apps	Goals	Apps	Goals	Apps	Goals	Apps	Goals	Yellow card	Red card	Ref
1	GK	Argentina	Marcos Peano	0	0	0	0	0	0	0	0	0	0	0	0	
2	CB	Argentina	Franco Calderón	0	0	0	0	0	0	0	0	0	0	0	0	
3	LB	Argentina	Claudio Corvalán	5	0	0	0	0	0	0	0	5	0	2	0	
4	RB	Argentina	Damián Martínez	4	0	0	0	0	0	0	0	4	0	4	1	
5	LM	Argentina	Nelson Acevedo	2(3)	0	0	0	0	0	0	0	2(3)	0	1	0	
6	CB	Argentina	Jonathan Bottinelli	5	0	0	0	0	0	0	0	5	0	3	1	
7	CF	Argentina	Pablo Cuadra	2(3)	0	0	0	0	0	0	0	2(3)	0	0	0	
8	RM	Argentina	Lucas Ríos	1(1)	0	0	0	0	0	0	0	1(1)	0	0	0	
9	CF	Argentina	Walter Bou	4	1	0	0	0	0	0	0	4	1	0	0	
10	RM	Argentina	Gabriel Carabajal	2	0	0	0	0	0	0	0	2	0	0	0	
11	CM	Argentina	Jalil Elías	5	0	0	0	0	0	0	0	5	0	1	0	
12	CF	Argentina	Nicolás Mazzola	1	0	0	0	0	0	0	0	1	0	0	0	
13	GK	Argentina	Alan Sosa	0	0	0	0	0	0	0	0	0	0	0	0	
14	LB	Argentina	Federico Milo	2(2)	0	0	0	0	0	0	0	2(2)	0	1	0	
15	AM	Argentina	Juan Cavallaro	0(1)	0	0	0	0	0	0	0	0(1)	0	0	0	
17	CB	Argentina	Brian Blasi	2	0	0	0	0	0	0	0	2	0	0	0	
18	AM	Argentina	Darío Bottinelli	0	0	0	0	0	0	0	0	0	0	0	0	
19	RB	Argentina	Ezequiel Bonifacio	5	1	0	0	0	0	0	0	5	1	2	0	
20	MF	Argentina	Gastón González	0	0	0	0	0	0	0	0	0	0	0	0	
22	CF	Argentina	Franco Troyansky	1(4)	0	0	0	0	0	0	0	1(4)	0	0	0	
21	MF	Argentina	Gastón Comas	1	0	0	0	0	0	0	0	1	0	0	0	
23	CF	Argentina	Manuel de Iriondo	0	0	0	0	0	0	0	0	0	0	0	0	
24	MF	Argentina	Franco Godoy	0	0	0	0	0	0	0	0	0	0	0	0	
25	GK	Argentina	Sebastián Moyano	5	0	0	0	0	0	0	0	5	0	0	0	
26	LB	Argentina	Federico Vera	0	0	0	0	0	0	0	0	0	0	0	0	
27	DM	Uruguay	Javier Méndez	3	0	0	0	0	0	0	0	3	0	0	0	
28	CB	Colombia	Yeimar Gómez Andrade	5	2	0	0	0	0	0	0	5	2	1	0	
29	LM	Argentina	Braian Álvarez	0	0	0	0	0	0	0	0	0	0	0	0	
30	MF	Argentina	Juan Ignacio Nardoni	0(1)	0	0	0	0	0	0	0	0(1)	0	0	0	
–	CM	Argentina	Nicolás Andereggen	0	0	0	0	0	0	0	0	0	0	0	0	
–	CF	Argentina	Federico Anselmo	0	0	0	0	0	0	0	0	0	0	0	0	
–	GK	Argentina	Ignacio Arce	0	0	0	0	0	0	0	0	0	0	0	0	
–	AM	Argentina	Claudio Aquino	0	0	0	0	0	0	0	0	0	0	0	0	
–	LW	Argentina	Rodrigo Cabalucci	0	0	0	0	0	0	0	0	0	0	0	0	
–	GK	Uruguay	Matías Castro	0	0	0	0	0	0	0	0	0	0	0	0	
–	CF	Argentina	Matías Gallegos	0	0	0	0	0	0	0	0	0	0	0	0	
–	CB	Argentina	Mariano Gómez	0	0	0	0	0	0	0	0	0	0	0	0	
–	MF	Argentina	Imanol Machuca	0	0	0	0	0	0	0	0	0	0	0	0	
–	GK	Argentina	Joaquín Papaleo	0	0	0	0	0	0	0	0	0	0	0	0	
Own goals				—	0	—	0	—	0	0	—	—	0	—	—	—
Players who left during the season
16	MF	Argentina	Matías García	0	0	0	0	0	0	0	0	0	0	0	0	
–	CM	Argentina	Facundo Britos	0	0	0	0	0	0	0	0	0	0	0	0	

Statistics accurate as of 31 August 2019.

=== Goalscorers ===
Rank	Pos	No.	Nat	Name	League	Cup	League Cup	Continental	Total	Ref
1	CB	28	Colombia	Yeimar Gómez Andrade	2	0	0	0	2	
2	CF	9	Argentina	Walter Bou	1	0	0	0	1	
2	RB	19	Argentina	Ezequiel Bonifacio	1	0	0	0	1	
Own goals					0	0	0	0	0	
Totals					4	0	0	0	4	—
