= 2017–18 Unión de Santa Fe season =

Unión de Santa Fe
2017–18 season
- President: Luis Spahn
- Manager: Leonardo Madelón (from 10 July 2017)
- Stadium: Estadio 15 de Abril
- Primera División: 3rd
- 2016–17 Copa Argentina: Round of 16
- 2017–18 Copa Argentina: Round of 64
- Top goalscorer: League: Franco Soldano (6); All: Two players (6)

The 2017–18 season is Unión de Santa Fe's 4th consecutive season in the top-flight of Argentine football. The season covers the period from 1 July 2017 to 30 June 2018.

== Current squad ==
As of 22 August 2017.

Note: Flags indicate national team as defined under FIFA eligibility rules; some limited exceptions apply. Players may hold more than one non-FIFA nationality.

| No. | Pos. | Nation | Player |
|---|---|---|---|
| 1 | GK | ARG | Nereo Fernández |
| 3 | DF | ARG | Lucas Pruzzo |
| 4 | DF | ARG | Jonatan Fleita |
| 5 | MF | ARG | Nelson Acevedo (on loan from Racing Club) |
| 6 | DF | ARG | Leonardo Sánchez |
| 9 | FW | ARG | Federico Anselmo |
| 10 | MF | ARG | Mauro Cejas |
| 12 | FW | ARG | Nicolás Andereggen |
| 13 | GK | ARG | Marcos Peano |
| 14 | DF | ARG | Bruno Pittón |
| 15 | FW | ARG | Walter Bracamonte |
| 16 | MF | ARG | Santiago Lebus |
| 18 | FW | ARG | Lucas Gamba |
| 20 | MF | ARG | Facundo Britos |
| 22 | DF | ARG | Emanuel Brítez |
| 23 | MF | ARG | Manuel de Iriondo |

| No. | Pos. | Nation | Player |
|---|---|---|---|
| 24 | MF | ARG | Lucas Algozino |
| 25 | MF | URU | Guillermo Méndez |
| 26 | DF | ARG | Agustín Sandona |
| 27 | FW | ARG | Franco Soldano |
| 29 | GK | URU | Matías Castro |
| 30 | MF | ARG | Mauro Pittón |
| 32 | MF | ARG | Robertino Insúa |
| 34 | DF | ARG | Brian Blasi |
| 35 | GK | ARG | Alan Sosa |
| 36 | FW | ARG | Jonatan Tarquini |
| 37 | MF | ARG | Franco Godoy |
| — | MF | ARG | Claudio Aquino |
| — | MF | ARG | Damián Arce |
| — | DF | ARG | Damián Martínez (on loan from Independiente) |
| — | MF | URU | Diego Zabala |
| — | MF | ARG | Julián Vitale (on loan from Independiente) |

=== Out on loan ===
Note: Flags indicate national team as defined under FIFA eligibility rules; some limited exceptions apply. Players may hold more than one non-FIFA nationality.

| No. | Pos. | Nation | Player |
|---|---|---|---|
| 2 | DF | ARG | Rodrigo Erramuspe (at Independiente Medellín until 30 June 2018) |
| — | MF | ARG | Mariano Mauri (at Unión de Sunchales until 30 June 2018) |

== Transfers ==
=== In ===
| Date | Pos. | Name | From | Fee |
|---|---|---|---|---|
| 16 July 2017 | MF | (Argentina) Damián Arce | (Argentina) Patronato | Undisclosed |
| 20 July 2017 | MF | (Uruguay) Diego Zabala | (Uruguay) Racing de Montevideo | Undisclosed |
| 22 July 2017 | MF | (Argentina) Claudio Aquino | (Argentina) Independiente | Undisclosed |

=== Out ===
| Date | Pos. | Name | To | Fee |
|---|---|---|---|---|
| 13 July 2017 | MF | (Argentina) Diego Villar | (Argentina) Aldosivi | Undisclosed |
| 16 July 2017 | MF | (Argentina) Martín Rivero | (Argentina) Patronato | Undisclosed |
| 16 July 2017 | MF | (Argentina) Santiago Magallán | (Spain) Cultural Leonesa | Undisclosed |
| 18 July 2017 | DF | (Argentina) Nahuel Zárate | (Argentina) Atlético Tucumán | Undisclosed |
| 31 July 2017 | GK | (Argentina) Ignacio Arce | (Argentina) San Martín de Tucumán | Undisclosed |

=== Loan in ===
| Date from | Date to | Pos. | Name | From |
|---|---|---|---|---|
| 2 August 2017 | 30 June 2018 | MF | (Argentina) Julián Vitale | (Argentina) Independiente |
| 2 August 2017 | 30 June 2018 | DF | (Argentina) Damián Martínez | (Argentina) Independiente |

=== Loan out ===
| Date from | Date to | Pos. | Name | To |
|---|---|---|---|---|
| 27 July 2017 | 30 June 2018 | MF | (Argentina) Mariano Mauri | (Argentina) Unión Sunchales |
| 31 July 2017 | 30 June 2018 | DF | (Argentina) Rodrigo Erramuspe | (Colombia) Independiente Medellín |

== Friendlies ==
=== Pre-season ===
Win Draw Loss

| – |

== Primera División ==
=== League table ===
| Pos | Team | Pld | W | D | L | GF | GA | GD | Pts | Qualification |
|---|---|---|---|---|---|---|---|---|---|---|
| 8 | River Plate | 27 | 13 | 6 | 8 | 39 | 26 | +13 | 45 | Qualification for Copa Libertadores group stage (Note: River Plate qualified for the Copa Libertadores group stage by winning the 2018 Copa Libertadores.) |
| 9 | Defensa y Justicia | 27 | 13 | 5 | 9 | 41 | 34 | +7 | 44 | Qualification for Copa Sudamericana first stage |
| 10 | Unión | 27 | 11 | 10 | 6 | 33 | 23 | +10 | 43 | Qualification for Copa Sudamericana first stage |
| 11 | Colón | 27 | 11 | 8 | 8 | 32 | 22 | +10 | 41 | Qualification for Copa Sudamericana first stage |
| 12 | Argentinos Juniors | 27 | 12 | 5 | 10 | 36 | 30 | +6 | 41 | Qualification for Copa Sudamericana first stage |

Source: AFA
Rules for classification: 1) points; 2) play-off (only if needed to decide championship); 3) goal difference; 4) goals scored; 5) head-to-head points; 6) head-to-head goal difference; 7) head-to-head goals scored.

=== Results by matchday ===
| Matchday | 1 | 2 | 3 | 4 | 5 | 6 | 7 | 8 | 9 | 10 | 11 | 12 | 13 | 14 | 15 | 16 | 17 | 18 | 19 | 20 | 21 | 22 | 23 | 24 | 25 | 26 | 27 |
|---|---|---|---|---|---|---|---|---|---|---|---|---|---|---|---|---|---|---|---|---|---|---|---|---|---|---|---|
| Ground | A | H | A | A | H | A | H | A | H | A | A | H | H | | | | | | | | | | | | | | |
| Result | D | W | W | D | W | L | W | W | D | L | W | D | | | | | | | | | | | | | | | |
| Position | 17 | 8 | 4 | 7 | 3 | 7 | 5 | 2 | 3 | 5 | 3 | 3 | | | | | | | | | | | | | | | |

Updated to match(es) played on 12 December 2017. Source: Soccerway
A = Away; H = Home; W = Win; D = Draw; L = Loss

| 28 August 2017 1 | Newell's Old Boys (Argentina) | 1–1 | (Argentina) Unión Santa Fe | Rosario, Argentina |
| 19:05 | M. Guevgeozián 74' (pen.) | Report | D. Zabala 52' | Stadium: Estadio Marcelo Bielsa; Referee: Fernando Espinoza (Argentina) |

| 11 September 2017 2 | Unión Santa Fe (Argentina) | 1–0 | (Argentina) Gimnasia y Esgrima | Santa Fe, Argentina |
| 19:05 | F. Soldano 21' | Report | | Stadium: Estadio 15 de Abril; Referee: Nicolás Lamolina (Argentina) |

| 16 September 2017 3 | Defensa y Justicia (Argentina) | 1–3 | (Argentina) Unión Santa Fe | Buenos Aires, Argentina |
| 14:05 | C. Rius 28' | Report | F. Soldano 18', 58'; L. Gamba 23' | Stadium: Estadio Norberto "Tito" Tomaghello; Referee: Andrés Merlos (Argentina) |

| 23 September 2017 4 | Huracán (Argentina) | 0–0 | (Argentina) Unión Santa Fe | Buenos Aires, Argentina |
| 14:05 | | Report | | Stadium: Estadio Tomás Adolfo Ducó; Referee: Facundo Tello (Argentina) |

| 29 September 2017 5 | Unión Santa Fe (Argentina) | 2–0 | (Argentina) Olimpo | Santa Fe, Argentina |
| 19:05 | F. Soldano 46'; L. Gamba 53' | Report | | Stadium: Estadio 15 de Abril; Referee: Pedro Argañaraz (Argentina) |

| 13 October 2017 6 | Lanús (Argentina) | 2–1 | (Argentina) Unión Santa Fe | Lanús, Argentina |
| 19:05 | J. Sand 61', 66' | Report | J. Bottinelli 36' | Stadium: Estadio Ciudad de Lanús – Néstor Díaz Pérez; Referee: Juan Pompei (Argentina) |

| 28 October 2017 7 | Unión Santa Fe (Argentina) | 2–0 | (Argentina) Godoy Cruz | Santa Fe, Argentina |
| 14:00 | L. Gamba 52' (pen.); D. Zabala 77' | Report | | Stadium: Estadio 15 de Abril; Referee: Pablo Echavarría (Argentina) |

| 6 November 2017 8 | Vélez Sarsfield (Argentina) | 0–2 | (Argentina) Unión Santa Fe | Buenos Aires, Argentina |
| 21:05 | | Report | F. Soldano 28'; L. Gamba 68' | Stadium: José Amalfitani Stadium; Referee: Federico Beligoy (Argentina) |

| 19 November 2017 9 | Unión Santa Fe (Argentina) | 0–0 | (Argentina) Chacarita Juniors | Santa Fe, Argentina |
| 17:00 | | Report | | Stadium: Estadio 15 de Abril; Referee: Mauro Vigliano (Argentina) |

| 22 November 2017 10 | River Plate (Argentina) | 2–0 | (Argentina) Unión Santa Fe | Buenos Aires, Argentina |
| 19:15 | R. Borré 67'; G. Martínez 74' (pen.) | Report | | Stadium: Estadio Monumental Antonio Vespucio Liberti; Referee: Patricio Loustau (Argentina) |

| 25 November 2017 11 | Patronato (Argentina) | 2–3 | (Argentina) Unión Santa Fe | Paraná, Argentina |
| 17:00 | S. Ribas 7', 60' | Report | D. Zabala 13'; F. Soldano 21'; L. Gamba 79' (pen.) | Stadium: Estadio Presbítero Bartolomé Grella; Referee: Jorge Baliño (Argentina) |

| 1 December 2017 12 | Unión Santa Fe (Argentina) | 1–1 | (Argentina) Belgrano | Santa Fe, Argentina |
| 17:00 | F. Fragapane 27' | Report | E. Godoy 59' | Stadium: Estadio 15 de Abril; Referee: Germán Delfino (Argentina) |

| January 2017 13 | Unión Santa Fe (Argentina) | – | (Argentina) Racing Club | Santa Fe, Argentina |
| | | Report | | Stadium: Estadio 15 de Abril |

== Copa Argentina ==
Win Draw Loss

| 16 August 2017 R32 | Lanús (Argentina) | 1–2 | (Argentina) Unión Santa Fe | Avellaneda, Argentina |
| 21:10 | A. Silva 34' | Report | M. de Iriondo 40'; L. Gamba 64' | Stadium: Estadio Julio Humberto Grondona; Referee: Federico Beligoy (Argentina) |

| 4 October 2017 R16 | Unión Santa Fe (Argentina) | 0–0 (4–5 p) | (Argentina) Deportivo Morón | Avellaneda, Argentina |
| 18:00 | | Report | | Stadium: Estadio Presidente Juan Domingo Perón; Referee: Andrés Merlos (Argentina) |
| | Penalties |
| | F. Fragapane (penalty missed); L. Gamba (penalty scored); G. Méndez (penalty scored); J. Rivas (penalty scored); J. Bottinelli (penalty scored); D. Martínez (penalty missed) | | E. Giménez (penalty missed); G. Martínez (penalty scored); D. Akerman (penalty scored); E. Méndez (penalty scored); N. Martínez (penalty scored); F. Racca (penalty scored) |
