= Damián Martínez =

Damián Martínez may refer to:

- Damián Martínez (footballer, born January 1990), Argentine defender
- Damián Martínez (footballer, born June 1990), Argentine forward
- Emiliano Martínez, Argentine goalkeeper
- Punishment Martinez, American professional wrestler
