= Damián Martínez (footballer, born 1990) =

Damián Martínez (footballer, born 1990) may refer to:

- Damián Martínez (footballer, born January 1990), Argentine defender for Unión Santa Fe
- Damián Martínez (footballer, born June 1990), Argentine forward for CRIBA
