= Sebastián Moyano =

Sebastián Moyano may refer to:

- Sebastián Moyano (footballer), Argentine footballer
- Sebastián de Belalcázar, Spanish conquistador
