= Tarquini =

Tarquini is an Italian surname. Notable people with this surname include:

- Camillo Tarquini (1810–1874), Italian Jesuit and Cardinal of the Roman Catholic Church
- Gabriele Tarquini (born 1962), Italian racing driver
- Gregorio Tarquini (died 1145), Italian cardinal of the Roman Catholic Church
- Jonatan Tarquini (born 1994), Argentine footballer
- Tarquinia Tarquini (1882–1976), Italian dramatic soprano and wife of Riccardo Zandonai
- Vittoria Tarquini (1670–1746), Italian opera soprano
