= Gabriel Carabajal =

Argentine professional footballer

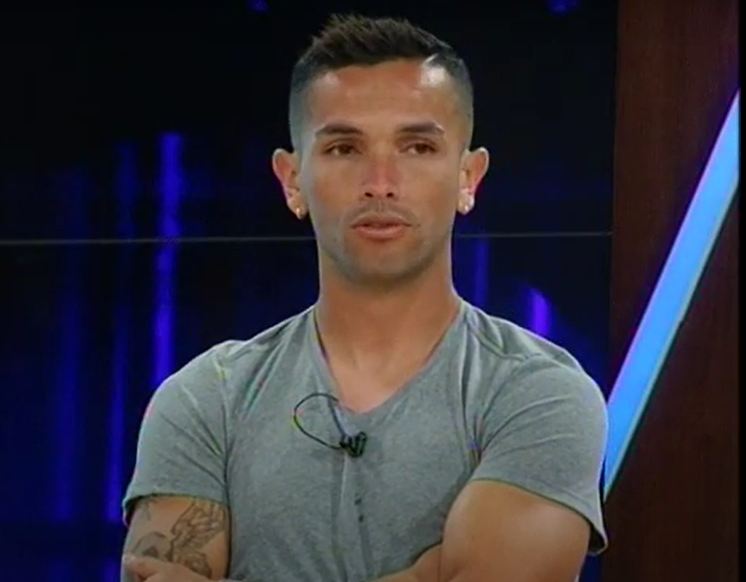
- Carabajal in 2019

Personal information
- Full name: Horacio Gabriel Carabajal
- Date of birth: 9 December 1990 (age 35)
- Place of birth: Lozada, Argentina
- Height: 1.78 m (5 ft 10 in)
- Position: Attacking midfielder

Team information
- Current team: Cusco FC
- Number: 27

Youth career
- Central Río Segundo
- Mitre de Pérez

Senior career*
Years	Team	Apps	(Gls)
2009	Patriotas	16	(1)
2010–2016	Talleres	84	(9)
2015	→ Univ. San Martín (loan)	20	(0)
2016	→ Godoy Cruz (loan)	7	(2)
2016–2018	Godoy Cruz	7	(0)
2017–2018	→ San Martín-SJ (loan)	21	(2)
2018–2019	Patronato	24	(6)
2019–2021	Unión Santa Fe	21	(2)
2021	→ Argentinos Juniors (loan)	32	(4)
2022	Argentinos Juniors	27	(3)
2022–2024	Santos	11	(1)
2023	→ Vasco (loan)	6	(0)
2023–2024	→ Puebla (loan)	15	(0)
2024	Newell's Old Boys	12	(0)
2025	Sarmiento	14	(2)
2025	Quilmes AC	11	(2)
2026-	Cusco FC	0	(0)
- * Club domestic league appearances and goals as of 18:15, 14 July 2025 (UTC)

Horacio Gabriel Carabajal (born 9 December 1990) is an Argentine professional footballer who plays as a midfielder for Cusco FC.

== Career ==
=== Early career ===
Born in Lozada, Province of Córdoba, Carabajal played youth and amateur football for local side Club Atlético Central Río Segundo and Club Mitre de Pérez before receiving an offer from Colombian Categoría Primera B side Patriotas in 2009. He made his senior debut for the club during the season, and scored his first senior goal on 25 March of that year, netting through a penalty in a 3–2 away loss against Atlético Bucaramanga.

=== Talleres ===
Upon returning to Argentina, Carabajal remained four months without a club before going on a trial period at Talleres. He was unable to play for a period, after having troubles with his documentation, and only made his debut for the side on 4 September 2011, in a 3–1 home win over Sportivo Belgrano. He scored his first goal for the side three days later, in a Copa Argentina 4–1 home success over General Paz Juniors.

Carabajal scored his first league goal for Talleres on 11 March 2012, netting his team's second in a 4–1 home routing of Douglas Haig. He was a regular starter in the club's promotion campaign to the Primera B Nacional, being close to a move to Godoy Cruz in July 2013.

==== Loan to Universidad San Martín ====
On 23 January 2015, Carabajal joined Universidad San Martín of the Peruvian Primera División on loan. His debut for Universidad San Martín occurred on 7 February, in a Torneo del Inca win against Juan Aurich, while his league debut came on 2 May, in a 1–1 away draw against Melgar.

Carabajal left the club in December 2015, after one goal in 30 appearances.

=== Godoy Cruz ===
On 3 January 2016, Carabajal moved to Godoy Cruz in the Argentine Primera División on loan for 18 months. He started his career at the club by scoring twice in seven appearances, before being sidelined for two months due to an injury.

On 4 August 2016, Carabajal signed for the club permanently after Fernando Godoy moved in the opposite direction.

==== Loan to San Martín de San Juan ====
On 23 July 2017, after losing his starting spot at Godoy Cruz, Carabajal joined fellow top-tier club San Martín de San Juan on loan.

=== Patronato ===
On 22 June 2018, Carabajal signed for Patronato, also in the first division. He scored a career-best six goals for the side during the season, as the club avoided relegation.

=== Unión Santa Fe ===
On 4 July 2019, Carabajal agreed to a three-year contract with Unión de Santa Fe, with the club acquiring 50% of his economic rights.

=== Argentinos Juniors ===
On 17 February 2021, after just five matches in the previous campaign, Carabajal joined Argentinos Juniors on loan until December. A regular starter, he was bought outright by the club on 19 December, for a US$ 500,000 fee.

=== Santos ===
On 12 August 2022, Carabajal was announced at Campeonato Brasileiro Série A side Santos, signing a four-year contract, for a rumoured fee of US$1.5 million. He made his debut for the club ten days later, starting in a 1–0 home win over São Paulo.

Carabajal scored his first goal for the club on 25 October 2022, netting his side's second in a 3–2 away loss against Flamengo.

==== Loans to Vasco da Gama and Puebla ====
On 20 April 2023, Carabajal was loaned to Vasco da Gama until the end of the year, with a buyout clause. On 25 August, after just six appearances for the club, his loan was cut short and he moved to Liga MX side Puebla also in a temporary deal.

=== Newell's Old Boys ===
Carabajal rescinded his contract with Santos on 4 July 2024, and signed a 18-month deal with Newell's Old Boys the following day.

== Personal life ==
A declared fan of Lionel Messi, Carabajal has two tattoos of the player on his left leg.

== Career statistics ==
As of 6 July 2024.

Club statistics
Club	Season	League			Cup (Note: Includes the Copa Colombia, Copa Argentina and Torneo del Inca)		League Cup		Continental (Note: Includes the Copa Libertadores and Copa Sudamericana)		State League (Note: Includes the Campeonato Paulista)		Other		Total	
Club	Season	Division	Apps	Goals	Apps	Goals	Apps	Goals	Apps	Goals	Apps	Goals	Apps	Goals	Apps	Goals
Patriotas	2009	Categoría Primera B	16	1	0	0	—		—		—		—		16	1
Talleres	2010–11	Torneo Argentino A	0	0	0	0	—		—		—		—		0	0
Talleres	2011–12	Torneo Argentino A	21	3	2	1	—		—		—		4 (Note: Appearance(s) in 2011–12 Torneo Argentino A play-offs)	0	27	4
Talleres	2012–13	Torneo Argentino A	22	4	4	1	—		—		—		—		26	5
Talleres	2013–14	Primera B Nacional	27	1	1	1	—		—		—		—		28	2
Talleres	2014	Torneo Federal A	14	1	0	0	—		—		—		—		14	1
Talleres	Total		84	9	7	3	—		—		—		4	0	95	12
Universidad San Martín	2015	Peruvian Primera División	20	0	11	1	—		—		—		—		31	1
Godoy Cruz	2016	Argentine Primera División	7	2	0	0	—		—		—		1 (Note: Appearance(s) in 2016 Argentine Primera División play-offs)	0	8	2
Godoy Cruz	2016–17	Argentine Primera División	7	0	1	0	—		1 (Note: Appearance(s) in Copa Libertadores)	0	—		0	0	9	0
Godoy Cruz	Total		14	2	1	0	—		1	0	—		1	0	17	2
San Martín SJ	2017–18	Argentine Primera División	21	2	0	0	—		—		—		—		21	2
Patronato	2018–19	Argentine Primera División	24	6	1	0	1 (Note: Appearance(s) in Copa de la Superliga)	0	—		—		—		26	6
Unión Santa Fe	2019–20	Argentine Primera División	16	1	0	0	1	0	2 (Note: Appearance(s) in Copa Sudamericana)	1	—		—		19	2
Unión Santa Fe	2020–21	Argentine Primera División	5	1	0	0	—		4	0	—		—		9	1
Unión Santa Fe	Total		21	2	0	0	1	0	6	1	—		—		28	3
Argentinos Juniors	2021	Argentine Primera División	32	4	3	1	—		6	0	—		—		41	5
Argentinos Juniors	2022	Argentine Primera División	27	3	2	0	—		—		—		—		29	3
Argentinos Juniors	Total		59	7	5	1	—		6	0	—		—		70	8
Santos	2022	Série A	8	1	—		—		—		—		—		8	1
Santos	2023	Série A	0	0	1	0	—		0	0	3 (Note: Appearance(s) in Campeonato Paulista)	0	—		4	0
Santos	Total		8	1	1	0	—		0	0	3	0	—		12	1
Vasco da Gama (loan)	2023	Série A	6	0	—		—		—		—		—		6	0
Puebla (loan)	2023–24	Liga MX	15	0	0	0	—		—		—		—		15	0
Career total			288	30	26	5	2	0	13	1	3	0	5	0	337	36

== Honours ==
Talleres

- Torneo Argentino A: 2012–13
