= Guillermo Pereira =

Argentine footballer

Personal information
- Full name: Guillermo Fabián Pereira
- Date of birth: 16 January 1994 (age 32)
- Place of birth: Pergamino, Argentina
- Height: 1.78 m (5 ft 10 in)
- Position: Midfielder

Team information
- Current team: Douglas Haig

Youth career
- Douglas Haig
- 2008–2014: Independiente

Senior career*
Years	Team	Apps	(Gls)
2014–2016	Independiente	0	(0)
2015	→ Athletic Club Morelos (loan)	11	(2)
2016–2018	Douglas Haig	61	(9)
2018–2020	Los Andes	44	(6)
2020–2021	Deportivo Riestra	24	(3)
2021–2022	Godoy Cruz	9	(0)
2022–2024	Belgrano	30	(2)
2024–2025	Deportivo Riestra	24	(1)
2025–2026	Los Andes	32	(4)
2026–	Douglas Haig	2	(1)
- * Club domestic league appearances and goals as of 18:12, 2 April 2026 (UTC)

Guillermo Fabián Pereira (born 16 January 1994) is an Argentine professional footballer who plays as a midfielder for Douglas Haig.

== Club career ==
Pereira is a product of the Douglas Haig youth system, though he left in order to join Independiente in 2008. He made his senior bow in April 2014 against Santamarina in the Copa Argentina, which was his sole appearance for the club. 2015 saw Pereira move to Mexico to play on loan for Athletic Club Morelos of Liga Premier. His first appearance came in a goalless draw with Albinegros de Orizaba on 5 September, which preceded his opening senior goal versus Puebla Premier coming in his second match. A further goal against Pioneros de Cancún across ten more games followed in the Mexican third tier.

A return to Douglas Haig was completed on 15 July 2016 after Pereira terminated his contract with Independiente. He was selected thirty-seven times in his first campaign, which concluded with relegation to Torneo Federal A; where he would score nine goals. June 2018 saw Pereira sign for Primera B Nacional's Los Andes. He made his debut in a home defeat to Independiente Rivadavia on 25 August, which was the first of forty-four appearances across two campaigns with Los Andes. In August 2020, Pereira joined Deportivo Riestra.

On 27 July 2021, Pereira joined Godoy Cruz on a deal until the end of 2022. He later extended his stay at the club into the 2022 season. On 15 June 2022, Pereira moved to Primera Nacional club Belgrano on a deal until the end of 2023.

== International career ==
In 2010, Pereira was selected by José Luis Brown for the Argentina U17s.

== Career statistics ==
As of 2 September 2020.

Appearances and goals by club, season and competition
Club	Season	League			Cup		Continental		Other		Total	
Club	Season	Division	Apps	Goals	Apps	Goals	Apps	Goals	Apps	Goals	Apps	Goals
Independiente	2013–14	Primera B Nacional	0	0	1	0	—		0	0	1	0
Independiente	2014	Primera División	0	0	0	0	—		0	0	0	0
Independiente	2015	Primera División	0	0	0	0	—		0	0	0	0
Independiente	2016	Primera División	0	0	0	0	—		0	0	0	0
Independiente	Total		0	0	1	0	—		0	0	1	0
Athletic Club Morelos (loan)	2015–16	Liga Premier	11	2	0	0	—		0	0	11	2
Douglas Haig	2016–17	Primera B Nacional	37	0	1	0	—		0	0	38	0
Douglas Haig	2017–18	Torneo Federal A	24	9	4	0	—		0	0	28	9
Douglas Haig	Total		61	9	5	0	—		0	0	66	9
Los Andes	2018–19	Primera B Nacional	21	1	0	0	—		0	0	21	1
Los Andes	2019–20	Primera B Metropolitana	23	5	0	0	—		0	0	23	5
Los Andes	Total		44	6	0	0	—		0	0	44	6
Deportivo Riestra	2020–21	Primera B Nacional	0	0	0	0	—		0	0	0	0
Career total			116	17	6	0	—		0	0	122	17

== Honours ==
Belgrano

- Primera Nacional: 2022
