= Lucas López (footballer, born 1994) =

Argentine footballer

Personal information
- Full name: Lucas Emanuel López Dessypris
- Date of birth: 3 January 1994 (age 32)
- Place of birth: Buenos Aires, Argentina
- Height: 1.89 m (6 ft 2 in)
- Position: Defender

Team information
- Current team: Douglas Haig

Senior career*
| Years | Team | Apps | (Gls) |
| 2012–2013 | Platense | 5 | (0) |
| 2013 | Rangers | 1 | (0) |
| 2014–2015 | Magallanes | 16 | (0) |
| 2016 | Sportivo Las Parejas | 7 | (1) |
| 2017–2018 | Unión de Totoras | 14 | (0) |
| 2019–2020 | Studebaker | – | (–) |
| 2020–2021 | San Martín Mendoza | 8 | (3) |
| 2021–2022 | Deportivo Maipú | 27 | (1) |
| 2022 | → Douglas Haig (loan) | 31 | (3) |
| 2023–2024 | Douglas Haig | 40 | (7) |
| 2024–2025 | Marsaxlokk | 26 | (4) |
| 2025–2026 | Floriana | 13 | (0) |
| 2026– | Douglas Haig | 2 | (2) |
- * Club domestic league appearances and goals as of 6 October 2025

Lucas Emanuel López Dessypris (born 3 January 1994) is an Argentine footballer who plays as a centre-back for Douglas Haig.

== Career ==
Besides Argentina, López has played in Chile for Deportes Magallanes and Rangers.

In 2024, López moved abroad again and signed with Maltese club Marsaxlokk.
