= Diego Martínez (footballer, born August 1984) =

Argentine footballer

Personal information
- Full name: Diego Leonardo Martínez
- Date of birth: 9 August 1984 (age 42)
- Place of birth: Comandante Nicanor Otamendi, Buenos Aires, Argentina
- Height: 1.83 m (6 ft 0 in)
- Position: Forward

Team information
- Current team: Kimberley
- Number: 20

Youth career
- Aldosivi

Senior career*
Years	Team	Apps	(Gls)
2005–2011	Aldosivi	149	(35)
2007	→ Alumni (loan)	14	(4)
2011–2012	San Lorenzo	1	(0)
2012	Patronato	5	(0)
2013	Rangers	14	(4)
2013–2014	Defensa y Justicia	15	(2)
2014	Talleres	18	(6)
2015	Atlanta	26	(3)
2016	Unión Aconquija	35	(14)
2017	Deportivo Laferrere	4	(0)
2017–2018	Cañuelas	15	(4)
2018–2019	Gimnasia y Tiro	15	(2)
2019	Círculo Deportivo	6	(0)
2020–2021	Liniers	9	(4)
2021–2023	Círculo Deportivo	65	(8)
2021–2022	→ La Amistad (loan)	9	(7)
2022–2023	→ Kimberley (loan)	24	(12)
2024–	Kimberley	5	(1)
- * Club domestic league appearances and goals as of 24 April 2024

Diego Leonardo Martínez (born 9 August 1984) is an Argentine footballer who plays as a forward for Kimberley of the Torneo Federal A.

== Career ==
In February 2024, Martínez rejoined Kimberley de Mar del Plata in the Torneo Federal A.

=== Teams ===
- (Argentina) Aldosivi de Mar del Plata 2005–2007
- (Argentina) Alumni de Villa María 2007
- (Argentina) Aldosivi de Mar del Plata 2008–2011
- (Argentina) San Lorenzo 2011–2012
- (Argentina) Patronato de Paraná 2012
- (Chile) Rangers 2013
- (Argentina) Defensa y Justicia 2013–2014
- (Argentina) Talleres Córdoba 2014–2015
- (Argentina) Atlanta 2015
