= Juan Ignacio Carrera =

Argentine footballer (born 1981)

Personal information
- Full name: Juan Ignacio Carrera
- Date of birth: May 10, 1981 (age 45)
- Place of birth: Pergamino, Argentina
- Height: 1.91 m (6 ft 3 in)
- Position: Goalkeeper

Team information
- Current team: Douglas Haig

Senior career*
Years	Team	Apps	(Gls)
2001–2011	Argentinos Juniors	1	(0)
2009–2010	→ I. Rivadavia (loan)	20	(0)
2011–2012	Sarmiento Resistencia		
2012–2014	San Martín Tucumán	13	(0)
2016	San Jorge Tucumán	11	(0)
2016–2021	Sarmiento Resistencia	136	(0)
2022–	Douglas Haig	79	(0)
- * Club domestic league appearances and goals as of 17:14, 15 June 2025 (UTC)

Juan Ignacio Carrera (born 10 May 1981 in Pergamino, Buenos Aires) is an Argentine football goalkeeper currently playing for Douglas Haig.
