= Juan Nardoni =

Argentine footballer

Personal information
- Full name: Juan Ignacio Martín Nardoni
- Date of birth: 14 July 2002 (age 24)
- Place of birth: Nelson, Argentina
- Height: 1.79 m (5 ft 10 in)
- Position: Central midfielder

Team information
- Current team: Grêmio
- Number: 5

Youth career
- Boca de Nelson
- FBC Libertad
- –2015: Corinthians Santa Fe
- 2015–2019: Unión Santa Fe

Senior career*
Years	Team	Apps	(Gls)
2019–2023	Unión Santa Fe	65	(1)
2023–2026	Racing	90	(3)
2026–	Grêmio	7	(1)
- * Club domestic league appearances and goals as of 7 April 2026

Juan Ignacio Martín Nardoni (born 14 July 2002) is an Argentine professional footballer who plays as a central midfielder for Campeonato Brasileiro Série A club Grêmio.

== Club career ==
Nardoni's youth career started with stints in local clubs Boca de Nelson and FBC Libertad, prior to his arrival in Santa Fe which saw him join Corinthians. Soon after, Nardoni joined the ranks of Unión Santa Fe; where his breakthrough into senior football would arrive at the beginning of 2019–20. Manager Leonardo Madelón selected him for his professional debut on 31 August 2019, as the midfielder replaced Gastón Comas after seventy-three minutes of a 2–1 defeat to San Lorenzo in the Primera División.

== International career ==
In July and August 2017, Nardoni was selected to train with the Argentina U15s; under the management of Diego Placente and Pablo Aimar.

== Career statistics ==
As of 9 February 2026.

Appearances and goals by club, season and competition
Club	Season	League			Cup		League Cup		Continental		Other		Total	
Club	Season	Division	Apps	Goals	Apps	Goals	Apps	Goals	Apps	Goals	Apps	Goals	Apps	Goals
Unión Santa Fe	2019–20	Primera División	1	0	0	0	1	0	3 (Note: Appearances in Copa Sudamericana)	0	10 (Note: Appearances in Copa de la Liga)	0	15	0
Unión Santa Fe	2021	Primera División	19	0	—		1	0	—		—		20	0
Unión Santa Fe	2022	Primera División	21	1	2	0	13	0	8	0	—		44	1
Unión Santa Fe	Total		41	1	2	0	15	0	11	0	10	0	79	1
Racing	2023	Primera División	26	1	2	0	12	0	7 (Note: Appearances in Copa Libertadores)	1	1 (Note: Appearances in Supercopa Internacional)	0	48	2
Racing	2024	Primera División	22	1	0	0	5	0	9	1	—		36	2
Racing	2025	Primera División	25	1	3	0	—		12 (Note: 2 appearances in Recopa Sudamericana and 10 appearances in Copa Libertadores)	0	—		40	1
Racing	2026	Primera División	2	0	0	0	—		0	0	—		2	0
Racing	Total		75	3	5	0	15	0	28	2	1	0	126	5
Grêmio	2026	Série A	0	0	0	0	—		—		—		0	0
Career total			116	4	7	0	30	0	39	2	11	0	205	6
