= Damián Arce =

Argentine footballer

Personal information
- Full name: Gerardo Damián Arce
- Date of birth: 6 July 1991 (age 35)
- Place of birth: Ezeiza, Argentina
- Height: 1.79 m (5 ft 10 1/2 in)
- Position: Midfielder

Youth career
- Boca Juniors

Senior career*
Years	Team	Apps	(Gls)
2012–2013	Riestra	34	(18)
2013–2015	Almagro	82	(10)
2016	Quilmes	4	(0)
2016–2017	Patronato	18	(5)
2017	Unión-SF	0	(0)
2018	San Martín (T)	10	(0)
2018–2019	Almagro	28	(3)
2019–2021	Instituto	41	(10)
2021–2022	Santiago Wanderers	22	(2)
- * Club domestic league appearances and goals as of 20:14, 15 January 2021 (UTC)

Gerardo Damián Arce (born 6 July 1991) is an Argentine professional footballer who last played for Santiago Wanderers in the Primera B de Chile as a midfielder.

== Career ==
Arce played for Boca Juniors' youth team. Deportivo Riestra of Primera D became Arce's first senior club in 2012. He remained for one year, 2012–13, and scored eighteen goals in thirty-four matches as the club missed out on promotion in the final versus Ituzaingó. In July 2013, Arce joined Primera B Metropolitana's Almagro. He made his professional debut on 19 August during a home loss to Atlanta, prior to scoring his opening Almagro goal against Barracas Central on 14 October. In total, Arce scored twelve times in eighty-eight games in three seasons with Almagro. January 2016 saw Arce join Argentine Primera División side Quilmes.

Four appearances followed before he left Quilmes. Arce subsequently joined Patronato. He scored on his second start, in a 4–2 victory over Arsenal de Sarandí. Arce scored four further goals in eighteen matches for Patronato in 2016–17. On 16 July 2017, Unión Santa Fe signed Arce. However, he departed six months later following zero first-team appearances for the club; appearing as an unused substitute in the Primera División twice in September. San Martín of Primera B Nacional became Arce's sixth senior career club in January 2018. He sealed a return to Almagro on 30 June 2018; a team now in Primera B Nacional.

== Career statistics ==
As of 12 September 2018.

Club statistics
Club	Season	League			Cup (Note: Includes the Copa Argentina)		League Cup		Continental		Other		Total	
Club	Season	Division	Apps	Goals	Apps	Goals	Apps	Goals	Apps	Goals	Apps	Goals	Apps	Goals
Deportivo Riestra	2012–13	Primera D	34	18	3	0	—		—		0	0	37	18
Deportivo Riestra	Total		34	18	3	0	—		—		0	0	37	18
Almagro	2013–14	Primera B Metropolitana	33	4	1	1	—		—		0	0	34	5
Almagro	2014	Primera B Metropolitana	13	0	0	0	—		—		0	0	13	0
Almagro	2015	Primera B Metropolitana	36	6	1	0	—		—		4 (Note: Four appearances in 2015 Primera B Metropolitana play-offs)	1 (Note: One goal in 2015 Primera B Metropolitana play-offs)	41	7
Almagro	Total		82	10	2	1	—		—		4	1	88	12
Quilmes	2016	Primera División	4	0	0	0	—		—		0	0	4	0
Patronato	2016–17	Primera División	18	5	1	0	—		—		0	0	19	5
Unión Santa Fe	2017–18	Primera División	0	0	0	0	—		—		0	0	0	0
San Martín	2017–18	Primera B Nacional	10	0	0	0	—		—		2 (Note: Two appearances in 2017–18 Primera B Nacional play-offs)	0	12	0
Almagro	2018–19	Primera B Nacional	2	0	2	0	—		—		0	0	4	0
Career total			150	33	8	1	—		—		6	1	164	35
