= Gastón Comas =

Argentine professional footballer

Personal information
- Full name: Jorge Gastón Comas
- Date of birth: 13 June 1998 (age 28)
- Place of birth: Paraná, Argentina
- Height: 1.74 m (5 ft 9 in)
- Position: Midfielder

Team information
- Current team: Salcedo FC

Youth career
- Unión de Santa Fe

Senior career*
Years	Team	Apps	(Gls)
2019–2023	Unión de Santa Fe	21	(0)
2022	→ Güemes (loan)	15	(1)
2023	Ben Hur		
2024	Círculo Deportivo	12	(2)
2024–2025	San José	6	(0)
2025-	Salcedo FC	7	(2)
- * Club domestic league appearances and goals as of 11 November 2025

Jorge Gastón Comas (born 13 June 1998) is an Argentine professional footballer who plays as a midfielder for Dominican club Salcedo FC.

== Career ==
Comas began his career with Unión de Santa Fe, having advanced through their youth set-up. Leonardo Madelón promoted him into the club's senior side in 2019, with his first taste of competitive action coming in April as he was an unused substitute for a Copa de la Superliga encounter with San Martín. Comas was on the bench two further times in the Primera División to start 2019–20, prior to making his professional bow on 31 August 2019 during a defeat away to San Lorenzo; playing all but the last seventeen minutes, when he was substituted for fellow debutant Juan Ignacio Nardoni. In February 2022, Comas joined Primera Nacional club Güemes on a loan deal for the rest of 2022.

On 14 June 2024, Comas signed with San José in Bolivia.

== Career statistics ==
As of 31 August 2019.

Appearances and goals by club, season and competition
Club	Season	League			Cup		League Cup		Continental		Other		Total	
Club	Season	Division	Apps	Goals	Apps	Goals	Apps	Goals	Apps	Goals	Apps	Goals	Apps	Goals
Unión de Santa Fe	2018–19	Primera División	0	0	0	0	0	0	0	0	0	0	0	0
Unión de Santa Fe	2019–20	Primera División	1	0	0	0	0	0	0	0	0	0	1	0
Career total			1	0	0	0	0	0	0	0	0	0	1	0
