= Mariano Mauri =

Argentine footballer

Personal information
- Full name: Mariano Augusto Mauri
- Date of birth: 4 August 1994 (age 32)
- Place of birth: Santa Fe, Argentina
- Height: 1.82 m (6 ft 0 in)
- Position: Left-back

Team information
- Current team: Douglas Haig

Senior career*
Years	Team	Apps	(Gls)
2014–2017	Unión Santa Fe	7	(0)
2015	→ Cipolletti (loan)	26	(2)
2016–2017	→ Sportivo Belgrano (loan)	26	(0)
2017	→ Unión Sunchales (loan)	0	(0)
2018	Sanjustino		
2018–2019	Atlético Paraná	20	(4)
2019	Chaco For Ever	0	(0)
2020	Americano de Carlos Pellegrini		
2021	Defensores	22	(0)
2022–2024	Douglas Haig	51	(2)
2024–2025	Sportivo Belgrano	23	(1)
2025	Defensores Unidos	7	(0)
2025–	Douglas Haig	18	(0)
- * Club domestic league appearances and goals as of 18:11, 2 April 2026 (UTC)

Mariano Augusto Mauri (born 4 August 1994) is an Argentine footballer who plays as a left-back for Club Atlético Douglas Haig.

== Career ==
Mauri's first career club was Unión Santa Fe, who he started appearing for professionally in 2014. He made two appearances during the 2013–14 Primera B Nacional campaign, though made his debut on 30 April in a Copa Argentina game with Juventud Unida Universitario. He made five subsequent appearances in 2014, a season which ended with promotion to the Argentine Primera División. On 15 May 2015, Cipolletti loaned Mauri. He scored his first career goal in his fourth match, on 7 June against General Belgrano. In total, Cipolletti selected Mauri in twenty-six fixtures and he netted two goals.

After returning to Unión Santa Fe, Mauri was loaned out once more in August 2016; to Sportivo Belgrano until June 2017. Twenty-six appearances followed throughout 2016–17. Fellow Torneo Federal A club Unión Sunchales temporarily signed Mauri upon his arrival back in Santa Fe. However, he left months later without featuring for their first-team. In early 2018, Mauri left Unión Santa Fe permanently to play in Torneo Federal C for Sanjustino. On 31 August, Mauri was signed by Atlético Paraná of Torneo Federal A. He scored four goals in one season, including one against ex-club Unión Sunchales.

A move to Chaco For Ever was completed in July 2019. However, Mauri left midway through the following season after not appearing competitively. He subsequently joined Americano de Carlos Pellegrini of Liga San Martín in January 2020.

== Personal life ==
Mauri's father is Jorge Mauri, a former professional footballer.

== Career statistics ==
As of 9 October 2020.

Club statistics
Club	Season	League			Cup		League Cup		Continental		Other		Total	
Club	Season	Division	Apps	Goals	Apps	Goals	Apps	Goals	Apps	Goals	Apps	Goals	Apps	Goals
Unión Santa Fe	2013–14	Primera B Nacional	2	0	1	0	—		—		0	0	3	0
Unión Santa Fe	2014	Primera B Nacional	5	0	0	0	—		—		0	0	5	0
Unión Santa Fe	2015	Primera División	0	0	0	0	—		—		0	0	0	0
Unión Santa Fe	2016	Primera División	0	0	0	0	—		—		0	0	0	0
Unión Santa Fe	2016–17	Primera División	0	0	0	0	—		—		0	0	0	0
Unión Santa Fe	2017–18	Primera División	0	0	0	0	—		—		0	0	0	0
Unión Santa Fe	Total		7	0	1	0	—		—		0	0	8	0
Cipolletti (loan)	2015	Torneo Federal A	20	2	0	0	—		—		6 (Note: Appearance(s) in the Torneo Federal A play-offs)	0	26	2
Sportivo Belgrano (loan)	2016–17	Torneo Federal A	22	0	0	0	—		—		4	0	26	0
Unión Sunchales (loan)	2017–18	Torneo Federal A	0	0	0	0	—		—		0	0	0	0
Atlético Paraná	2018–19	Torneo Federal A	20	4	3	0	—		—		0	0	23	4
Chaco For Ever	2019–20	Torneo Federal A	0	0	0	0	—		—		0	0	0	0
Career total			69	6	4	0	—		—		10	0	83	6
