= Rodrigo Cabalucci =

Argentine footballer

Personal information
- Full name: Rodrigo Martín Cabalucci
- Date of birth: 22 July 1992 (age 34)
- Place of birth: Lomas de Zamora, Argentina
- Height: 1.73 m (5 ft 8 in)
- Position: Forward

Team information
- Current team: Douglas Haig

Youth career
- Douglas Haig

Senior career*
Years	Team	Apps	(Gls)
2011–2016	Douglas Haig	132	(15)
2016–2018	Olimpo	17	(6)
2018–2019	Unión Santa Fe	0	(0)
2018–2019	→ Agropecuario (loan)	4	(0)
2019–2021	Olimpo	15	(0)
2021–	Douglas Haig	107	(19)
- * Club domestic league appearances and goals as of 16:14, 3 April 2026 (UTC)

Rodrigo Martín Cabalucci (born 22 July 1992) is an Argentine professional footballer who plays as a forward for Douglas Haig.

== Career ==
Cabalucci's first club were Douglas Haig, he played for the club between 2011 and 2016; making one hundred and thirty-two appearances and scoring fifteen goals. His first league goal for Douglas Haig arrived in April 2011 during a 1–1 Torneo Argentino A tie with Rivadavia. After two seasons in Torneo Argentino A, Douglas Haig were promoted to Primera B Nacional after winning the 2011–12 Torneo Argentino A title. He scored on his professional career debut on 12 August, netting the winning goal in a 2–1 victory over Patronato. He remained with the club in Primera B Nacional for five campaigns.

In July 2016, Cabalucci joined Argentine Primera División side Olimpo. He subsequently scored six goals in seventeen matches in his debut season in the Primera División. Cabalucci didn't feature during 2017–18 due to injury, with Olimpo suffering relegation. In August 2018, Cabalucci joined Unión Santa Fe. Two months later, after not playing for Unión, Cabalucci was loaned to Primera B Nacional's Agropecuario.

== Career statistics ==
As of 4 November 2018.

Club statistics
Club	Season	League			Cup (Note: Includes the Copa Argentina)		League Cup		Continental (Note: Includes the Copa Sudamericana)		Other		Total	
Club	Season	Division	Apps	Goals	Apps	Goals	Apps	Goals	Apps	Goals	Apps	Goals	Apps	Goals
Olimpo	2016–17	Primera División	17	6	1	0	—		—		0	0	18	6
Olimpo	2017–18	Primera División	0	0	0	0	—		—		0	0	0	0
Olimpo	Total		17	6	1	0	—		—		0	0	18	6
Unión Santa Fe	2018–19	Primera División	0	0	0	0	—		0	0	0	0	0	0
Agropecuario (loan)	2018–19	Primera B Nacional	0	0	0	0	—		—		0	0	0	0
Career total			17	6	1	0	—		0	0	0	0	18	6

== Honours ==
Douglas Haig

- Torneo Argentino A: 2011–12
