= Lucas Gamba =

Argentine footballer

Personal information
- Full name: Lucas Emanuel Gamba
- Date of birth: 24 June 1987 (age 39)
- Place of birth: Mendoza, Argentina
- Position: Forward

Team information
- Current team: Barracas Central
- Number: 21

Youth career
- Argentino de Mendoza

Senior career*
Years	Team	Apps	(Gls)
2006–2007	Gimnasia y Tiro	1	(0)
2008–2014	Maipú	132	(32)
2009–2010	→ Rivadavia (loan)	13	(0)
2013–2014	→ Rivadavia (loan)	19	(7)
2014–2018	Unión Santa Fe	97	(19)
2018–2019	Huracán	24	(6)
2019–2022	Rosario Central	78	(11)
2022–2023	LDU Quito	12	(0)
2023–2024	Central Córdoba	40	(7)
2024–2026	Unión Santa Fe	66	(7)
2026–	Barracas Central	5	(1)
- * Club domestic league appearances and goals as of 17:06, 3 June 2026 (UTC)

Lucas Emanuel Gamba (born 24 June 1987) is an Argentine footballer who plays for Barracas Central.

== Career statistics ==
As of match played on 3 March 2018

Appearances and goals by club, season and competition
Club	Season	League			Cup		League Cup		Other		Total	
Club	Season	Division	Apps	Goals	Apps	Goals	Apps	Goals	Apps	Goals	Apps	Goals
Deportivo Maipú	2008–09	Torneo Argentino A	?	12	0	0	—		0	0	0	12
Independiente Rivadavia	2009–10	Primera B Nacional	13	0	0	0	—		0	0	13	0
Deportivo Maipú	2010–11	Torneo Argentino A	?	4	0	0	—		0	0	0	4
Deportivo Maipú	2011–12	Torneo Argentino A	?	1	0	0	—		0	0	0	1
Deportivo Maipú	2012–13	Torneo Argentino A	34	9	1	0	—		0	0	35	9
Deportivo Maipú	2013–14	Torneo Argentino A	16	5	1	0	—		0	0	17	5
Deportivo Maipú	Total		50	19	2	0	0	0	0	0	52	19
Independiente Rivadavia (loan)	2013–14	Primera B Nacional	19	7	0	0	—		0	0	19	7
Unión Santa Fe	2014	Primera B Nacional	19	5	0	0	—		0	0	19	5
Unión Santa Fe	2015	Argentine Primera División	30	6	1	0	—		0	0	31	6
Unión Santa Fe	2016	Argentine Primera División	14	2	1	0	—		0	0	15	2
Unión Santa Fe	2016–17	Argentine Primera División	30	4	3	1	—		0	0	33	5
Unión Santa Fe	2017–18	Argentine Primera División	16	5	3	1	—		0	0	19	6
Unión Santa Fe	Total		109	22	8	2	0	0	0	0	117	24
Career totals			191	60	10	2	0	0	0	0	201	62
