= Lucas Algozino =

Argentine footballer

Personal information
- Full name: Lucas Algozino
- Date of birth: 29 September 1995 (age 31)
- Place of birth: Santa Fe, Argentina
- Position: Midfielder

Team information
- Current team: Sportivo Belgrano

Youth career
- Unión Santa Fe

Senior career*
Years	Team	Apps	(Gls)
2015–2021	Unión Santa Fe	22	(0)
2018	→ Brown (PM) (loan)	11	(0)
2018–2019	→ Sportivo Belgrano (loan)	16	(0)
2019–2020	→ Alvarado (loan)	15	(1)
2021	Güemes	29	(1)
2022	Independiente Rivadavia	4	(0)
2022–2023	Brown (A)	20	(0)
2023–	Sportivo Belgrano	13	(0)
- * Club domestic league appearances and goals as of 19:52, 3 October 2023 (UTC)

Lucas Algozino (born 29 September 1995) is an Argentine footballer who plays for Sportivo Belgrano.
