= Comandante Nicanor Otamendi =

Comandante Nicanor Otamendi Dionisia
- City
- Location within Buenos Aires Province
- Coordinates: 38°07′S 57°51′W
- Country: Argentina
- Province: Buenos Aires
- Partido: General Alvarado
- Founded: May 29, 1911

Government
  - Mayor: Sebastián Ianantuony
- Elevation: 55 m (180 ft)

Population (2010 census [INDEC])
  - Total: 6,623
- Time zone: UTC−3 (ART)
- CPA Base: B 7603
- Area code: +54 02291
- Climate: Cfa

Comandante Nicanor Otamendi, popularly known as Otamendi, is a city in General Alvarado Partido in the province of Buenos Aires, Argentina, located 36 km from Mar del Plata and 20 km from Miramar, the partido's seat of government. It is the second most important city in General Alvarado Partido.

== History ==
The city takes its name from Argentine Army Commander Nicanor Otamendi, who was killed by indigenous raiders during a malón (raid) led by chief Yanquetruz, comprising more than 200 lancers, along with nearly all 125 soldiers of the national militia that Lieutenant Colonel Otamendi himself commanded, intending to block the raiders' path. The battle took place at San Antonio de Iraola (in what is now Benito Juárez Partido) on 13 September 1855. Only one soldier survived, gravely wounded and left for dead.

In 1908, the Buenos Aires Great Southern Railway was authorized to construct two new branch lines departing from Mar del Plata: one heading to Miramar and another to San Agustín in Balcarce Partido, with the lines bifurcating at a station that would be called Dionisia. The land through which the tracks were laid had belonged to Balbina Josefina Otamendi de Iñurrigarro, as part of her estate known as El Infierno. In 1910, she donated the land for the railway station and named it "Dionisia" in honour of her mother, Dionisia Byrón de Otamendi. The station opened in February 1911, simultaneously with that of Miramar.

Once the railway was operational, Balbina authorized the subdivision of the surrounding land to found a new town, which would bear the name of her great-uncle: Comandante Nicanor Otamendi. Engineer Gustavo Otamendi drew up the plans for the future city and presented them to the provincial government of General José Tomás Sojo. On 29 May 1911, the founding decree was promulgated by the Buenos Aires Province government under Governor General José Inocencio Áreas. The land auction for lots, smallholdings, and farms was held at the Teatro Municipal Colón in Mar del Plata, and the fertility of the soil attracted both immigrants and native Argentines, who soon began cultivating the land.

Dionisia station served as the social and economic hub around which Otamendi grew. For many years, the station retained the name "Dionisia" while the town itself bore the military commander's name; older residents still refer to the place by that name. In 1952, the national Executive Power resolved to eliminate the name "Dionisia" from the railway station, post office, and state telephone service, unifying all under the name "Comandante Nicanor Otamendi". In its early years the station was a significant railway junction, connecting lines across the southeastern Buenos Aires region and handling very active rural freight traffic. This continued until the mid-1970s, when the closure of branch lines and services brought a decline that permanently altered the character of the town, which had once supported travellers' hotels, large warehouses, and general stores.

In October 1975, by provincial decree 6682/75, Comandante Nicanor Otamendi was elevated to the rank of city.

== Geography ==
Comandante Nicanor Otamendi sits in the heart of the southeastern Buenos Aires Province, on gently rolling terrain of recognised agricultural fertility. It lies 36 km from Mar del Plata, 20 km from Miramar, 60 km from Balcarce, 100 km from Necochea, and approximately 440 km from the Autonomous City of Buenos Aires.

The urban area covers 958 hectares, divided into two by the railway line. The streets are oriented according to the four cardinal points, which is unusual for towns in Buenos Aires Province, where streets are typically aligned to the four winds. The city has two symmetrical plazas, one to the north and one to the south, and each block was originally subdivided into twenty-four lots.

== Economy ==
The local economy is predominantly agricultural. The area produces around 30% of all potatoes harvested in the country, making it one of the most significant potato-growing zones in Argentina. The high crop yields have a considerable impact on the provincial economy.

The city hosts the Fiesta Provincial de la Papa (Provincial Potato Festival), organised by Club Círculo Deportivo, which brings together the leading producers from Buenos Aires Province. The festival features machinery exhibitions, stands of cultural interest, and promotion of the potato sector. Free outdoor live music performances of various genres are also offered, and a formal gala ceremony is held during which the provincial potato queen is elected. The festival takes place annually during the first half of March.

== Demographics ==
According to the 2010 census [INDEC], the city had a population of 6,623, representing a 10% increase from the 5,977 recorded in the 2001 census [INDEC].

Historical population
Year	Pop.	±%
1960	4,046	—
1970	5,129	+26.8%
1980	5,080	−1.0%
1991	5,616	+10.6%
2001	5,977	+6.4%
2010	6,623	+10.8%
Sources: INDEC

== Sports ==
Football is the dominant sport in Comandante Nicanor Otamendi. The city's clubs compete in the Liga de Fútbol de General Alvarado (LFGA), the regional competition that brings together sides from across the partido, including teams from Miramar, parts of Mar del Plata, Batán, and other neighbouring localities.

The most prominent club is Círculo Deportivo, founded on 23 December 1921, and the largest sporting institution in General Alvarado Partido. After establishing dominance in the regional league, the club joined the Liga Marplatense de Fútbol in 1950, becoming the only team from Otamendi to compete at that level, and the only team outside of Mar del Plata to have won said league. It is also the only club from General Alvarado Partido to have appeared in the Argentine First Division, participating in the Primera División in 1977 and 1985. The club currently competes in the Torneo Federal A, the third tier of Argentine football. Its home ground, the Estadio Guillermo Trama, is named after the city's most celebrated sportsman, who won three national titles as a professional and was designated Sports Ambassador of General Alvarado Partido by municipal decree in 2021.

Within the LFGA, Círculo Deportivo's traditional local rival is Club Atlético Juventud Unida, also based in Comandante Nicanor Otamendi. Juventud Unida holds the most LFGA titles among the city's clubs and ranks second in the league's all-time standings, behind only Defensores de Miramar.

== Religion ==
Catholic Church
Diocese	Mar del Plata
Parish	Santa Teresita del Niño Jesús
