= Pablo Villalba =

Paraguayan footballer (born 1987)

Personal information
- Full name: Pablo Alcides Villalba Fretes
- Date of birth: 16 March 1989 (age 37)
- Place of birth: Paraguay
- Position: Forward

Senior career*
Years	Team	Apps	(Gls)
2009–2010	Arsenal de Sarandí	1	(0)
2010–2011	Los Andes		
2012–2014	Comunicaciones	59	(6)
2014–2015	Deportivo Español	51	(14)
2016–2017	Unión Aconquija	38	(14)
2017–2018	Chaco For Ever	20	(3)
2018	Estudiantes Caseros	1	(0)
2019–2020	Comunicaciones	10	(0)
- * Club domestic league appearances and goals

Pablo Alcides Villalba Fretes (born 17 March 1987) is a Paraguayan former footballer.
