= Marcos Peano =

Argentine footballer

Personal information
- Full name: Marcos Hernán Peano
- Date of birth: 15 October 1998 (age 28)
- Place of birth: Freyre, Argentina
- Height: 1.85 m (6 ft 1 in)
- Position: Goalkeeper

Team information
- Current team: RAAL La Louvière
- Number: 21

Youth career
- 9 de Julio Freyre
- 2010–2016: Unión Santa Fe

Senior career*
Years	Team	Apps	(Gls)
2016–2022	Unión Santa Fe	4	(0)
2021	→ Defensores (loan)	6	(0)
2022	→ Defensa y Justicia (loan)	0	(0)
2023	Atlético Rafaela	37	(0)
2024	Instituto	0	(0)
2024–	RAAL La Louvière	62	(0)

International career
2015	Argentina U17	2	(0)
2016	Argentina U20		
- * Club domestic league appearances and goals as of 11 May 2026

Marcos Hernán Peano (born 15 October 1998) is an Argentine professional footballer who plays as a goalkeeper for RAAL La Louvière.

== Club career ==
Peano played for local club 9 de Julio Freyre in his youth career, which preceded a move to Unión Santa Fe in 2010. After six years in their system, he was promoted into their first-team during 2016 when he was an unused substitute for a Copa Argentina match with Unión Aconquija and an Primera División fixture versus Racing Club. Peano made his professional debut in September 2018, featuring for sixty-three minutes of a league draw with Colón. Seven more appearances, three in the domestic league and four in the cups, occurred across the next two years for the goalkeeper.

On 10 February 2021, Peano was sent out on loan to Defensores de Belgrano of Primera B Nacional. On 29 January 2022, he then moved to Defensa y Justicia on loan until the end of the year.

== International career ==
Peano was selected by the Argentina U17s for the 2015 FIFA U-17 World Cup in Chile. He featured in their opening two fixtures against Mexico and Germany, both ended in defeat which sealed Argentina's elimination. The U20s called up Peano for the 2016 COTIF Tournament.

== Career statistics ==
As of 10 August 2025.

Club	Division	League			Cup		Continental		Total	
Club	Division	Season	Apps	Goals	Apps	Goals	Apps	Goals	Apps	Goals
Unión Santa Fe	Primera División	2016–17	—		—		—		0	0
Unión Santa Fe	Primera División	2017–18	0	0	0	0	—		0	0
Unión Santa Fe	Primera División	2018–19	1	0	4	0	—		5	0
Unión Santa Fe	Primera División	2019–20	3	0	—		—		3	0
Unión Santa Fe	Primera División	2020	—		—		—		0	0
Unión Santa Fe	Total		4	0	4	0	0	0	8	0
Defensores	Primera B Nacional	2021	6	0	—		—		6	0
Defensa y Justicia	Primera División	2022	—		—		1	0	1	0
Atlético Rafaela	Primera B Nacional	2023	37	0	—		—		37	0
Instituto	Primera División	2024	0	0	0	0	—		0	0
RAAL La Louvière	Challenger Pro League	2024–25	28	0	2	0	—		30	0
RAAL La Louvière	Belgian First Division A	2025–26	3	0	0	0	—		3	0
RAAL La Louvière	Total		31	0	2	0	0	0	33	0
Career total			78	0	6	0	1	0	85	0
