= Pablo Ruiz (footballer, born 1987) =

Argentine footballer

Personal information
- Full name: Pablo Martín Ruiz
- Date of birth: 17 July 1987 (age 39)
- Place of birth: Buenos Aires, Argentina
- Height: 1.77 m (5 ft 10 in)
- Position: Left winger

Team information
- Current team: Comunicaciones

Youth career
- 1998–2004: Nueva Chicago

Senior career*
Years	Team	Apps	(Gls)
2007–2011	Nueva Chicago	113	(14)
2011	Godoy Cruz	0	(0)
2012–2013	Estudiantes	31	(4)
2013–2014	Platense	32	(2)
2014–2015	Nueva Chicago	32	(1)
2016	Juventud Unida	18	(0)
2016–2017	Villa Dálmine	29	(8)
2017–2018	Celaya	29	(3)
2018–2019	Mitre	21	(7)
2019	Oriente Petrolero	20	(5)
2020–2022	San Martín SJ	70	(5)
2023–2026	Tristán Suárez	97	(7)
2026–	Comunicaciones	2	(0)
- * Club domestic league appearances and goals as of 00:18, 9 March 2026 (UTC)

Pablo Martín Ruiz (born 17 July 1987) is an Argentine footballer who plays as a left winger for Primera B Metropolitana club Comunicaciones.

== Career ==
Ruiz came through the youth system of Nueva Chicago and debuted for the senior team in 2007. In August 2011, he joined Godoy Cruz of the Argentine Primera División. On 15 December 2016, it was reported that he signed for South Korean side Seoul E-Land FC, however, the transfer was never finalised.
