= Santiago Lebus =

Argentine footballer

Personal information
- Full name: Santiago Nicolás Lebus
- Date of birth: 18 July 1996 (age 30)
- Place of birth: Santo Tomé, Argentina
- Height: 1.80 m (5 ft 11 in)
- Position: Midfielder

Team information
- Current team: AB Argir
- Number: 8

Youth career
- Unión Santa Fe

Senior career*
| Years | Team | Apps | (Gls) |
| 2016–2019 | Unión Santa Fe | 4 | (0) |
| 2019 | → All Boys (loan) | 3 | (0) |
| 2020 | FATIC | | |
| 2020–2021 | Petrolero | | |
| 2021 | Real Pilar | 18 | (0) |
| 2022– | Argir | 37 | (0) |
| 2022 | → Fuglafjørður (loan) | 7 | (2) |
- * Club domestic league appearances and goals as of 10 November 2023

Santiago Nicolás Lebus (born 18 July 1996) is an Argentine professional footballer who plays as a midfielder for AB Argir.

== Career ==
Lebus became a first-team player with Unión Santa Fe during the 2017–18 Argentine Primera División campaign, making his professional bow on 3 February 2018 against Rosario Central; having previously been an unused substitute on five occasions in two previous seasons. After making his debut, he made three further league appearances in 2017–18. After a loan spell at All Boys in 2019, Lebus left Unión Santa Fe and moved to Bolivia in the beginning of 2020, where he signed with Deportivo FATIC. Later in 2020, he moved to fellow Bolivian club Club Independiente Petrolero.

In February 2021, Lebus returned to his homeland, when he signed with Primera C Metropolitana club Real Pilar. A year later, in February 2022, Lebus once again moved abroad, this time alongside his teammate from Real Pilar, Elvio Gelmini, to the Faroe Islands, where the duo signed a deal with Faroe Islands Premier League club AB Argir. But due to rules on registration of foreign players, both Lebus and Gelmini were loaned to 1. deild club ÍF Fuglafjørður until the end of the year.

== Career statistics ==
As of 26 May 2018.

Club statistics
| Club | Season | League | | | Cup (Note: Includes the Copa Argentina) | | League Cup | | Continental | | Other | | Total | |
| Club | Season | Division | Apps | Goals | Apps | Goals | Apps | Goals | Apps | Goals | Apps | Goals | Apps | Goals |
|---|---|---|---|---|---|---|---|---|---|---|---|---|---|---|
| Unión Santa Fe | 2016 | Primera División | 0 | 0 | 0 | 0 | — | | — | | 0 | 0 | 0 | 0 |
| Unión Santa Fe | 2016–17 | Primera División | 0 | 0 | 0 | 0 | — | | — | | 0 | 0 | 0 | 0 |
| Unión Santa Fe | 2017–18 | Primera División | 4 | 0 | 0 | 0 | — | | — | | 0 | 0 | 4 | 0 |
| Career total | | | 4 | 0 | 0 | 0 | — | | — | | 0 | 0 | 4 | 0 |
