= Mariano Martínez (footballer) =

Argentine footballer (born 1979)

Personal information
- Full name: Mariano Matías Martínez
- Date of birth: 29 January 1979 (age 47)
- Place of birth: Buenos Aires, Argentina
- Height: 1.80 m (5 ft 11 in)
- Position: Forward

Youth career
- Atlanta

Senior career*
Years	Team	Apps	(Gls)
1999–2000	Atlanta	31	(4)
2000–2001	General Belgrano	–	(–)
2001–2002	Los Andes	7	(0)
2002	Platense	12	(0)
2003	Brown de Arrecifes	13	(3)
2003	Rangers-CHI	16	(3)
2004	Maracaibo	18	(3)
2004	Aris	8	(0)
2005	Unión Santa Fe	12	(1)
2005–2006	Huracán-TA	31	(4)
2006	Chacarita Juniors	10	(0)
2007	Almagro	17	(5)
2007–2008	Olimpo	17	(1)
2008–2009	Argentinos Juniors	14	(0)
2009–2010	Arsenal de Sarandí	2	(0)
2010	Huracán	10	(1)
2011	Aldosivi	20	(7)
2011–2012	Tucumán	27	(2)
2012–2014	Morón	73	(16)
2015–2016	Comunicaciones	33	(4)
2016–2017	Laferrere	29	(5)
2017–2018	Argentino de Quilmes	16	(3)
Total		416	(72)
- * Club domestic league appearances and goals

Mariano Matías Martínez (born 29 January 1979) is an Argentine former footballer. He played as a forward.

== Teams ==
- (Argentina) Atlanta 1999-2001
- (Argentina) Los Andes 2001-2002
- (Argentina) Platense 2002-2003
- (Chile) Rangers 2003
- (Argentina) Almirante Brown 2003–2004
- (Venezuela) Unión Atlético Maracaibo 2004
- (Greece) Aris 2004-2005
- (Argentina) Unión de Santa Fe 2005
- (Argentina) Chacarita Juniors 2006–2007
- (Argentina) Almagro 2007
- (Argentina) Olimpo de Bahía Blanca 2007-2008
- (Argentina) Argentinos Juniors 2008-2009
- (Argentina) Arsenal de Sarandí 2009-2010
- (Argentina) Huracán 2010
- (Argentina) Aldosivi de Mar del Plata 2011
- (Argentina) Atlético Tucumán 2011-2012
- (Argentina) Deportivo Morón 2012-2015
- (Argentina) Club Comunicaciones 2015-2016
