= Jonatan Tarquini =

Argentine footballer (born 1994)

Personal information
- Full name: Jonatan Gabriel Tarquini
- Date of birth: 27 June 1994 (age 32)
- Place of birth: Santa Fe, Argentina
- Position: Forward

Senior career*
Years	Team	Apps	(Gls)
2014–2017	Unión Santa Fe	8	(0)
2016	→ Brown (loan)	2	(0)
2017	→ Sarmiento de Humboldt (loan)		
2018	Sanjustino		
2019	Unión Santo Domingo		
- * Club domestic league appearances and goals

Jonatan Gabriel Tarquini (born 27 June 1994) is an Argentine footballer who plays as a forward.

== Career ==
Tarquini became a senior player for Unión Santa Fe of Primera B Nacional in May 2014. Days after being an unused substitute versus Juventud Unida Universitario in the Copa Argentina, Tarquini made his professional debut in the league during an away draw to Atlético Tucumán. In his first two campaigns with the club, he made eight appearances. In January 2016, Primera B Nacional's Brown signed Tarquini on loan. He was sent off in his second match against Guillermo Brown, receiving a red card two minutes after being substituted on; it turned out to be his last fixture for Brown.

Tarquini was loaned by Sarmiento de Humboldt in late 2017. In the following year, 2018, he joined Sanjustino in Torneo Federal C. In February 2019, it was revealed that Tarquini had joined Unión Santo Domingo of Liga Esperancina. He left at the end of the year.

== Career statistics ==
As of 14 September 2020.

Club statistics
Club	Season	League			Cup		League Cup		Continental		Other		Total	
Club	Season	Division	Apps	Goals	Apps	Goals	Apps	Goals	Apps	Goals	Apps	Goals	Apps	Goals
Unión Santa Fe	2013–14	Primera B Nacional	4	0	0	0	—		—		0	0	4	0
Unión Santa Fe	2014	Primera B Nacional	4	0	0	0	—		—		0	0	4	0
Unión Santa Fe	2015	Primera División	0	0	0	0	—		—		0	0	0	0
Unión Santa Fe	2016	Primera División	0	0	0	0	—		—		0	0	0	0
Unión Santa Fe	2016–17	Primera División	0	0	1	0	—		—		0	0	1	0
Unión Santa Fe	2017–18	Primera División	0	0	0	0	—		—		0	0	0	0
Unión Santa Fe	Total		8	0	1	0	—		—		0	0	9	0
Brown (loan)	2016	Primera B Nacional	2	0	0	0	—		—		0	0	2	0
Career total			10	0	1	0	—		—		0	0	11	0
