= Leandro Ledesma =

Argentine footballer

Personal information
- Full name: Leandro Adrian Ledesma
- Date of birth: 15 March 1987 (age 39)
- Place of birth: Santa Fe, Argentina
- Height: 1.75 m (5 ft 9 in)
- Position: Forward

Team information
- Current team: Unión Aconquija

Senior career*
Years	Team	Apps	(Gls)
2007	Patronato Paraná		
2008–2010	Atlético Colón	3	(0)
2009–2010	→ Tiro Federal (loan)	10	(1)
2010–2011	Ben Hur		
2011–2012	Tiro Federal	10	(1)
2012	La Emilia		
2012–2013	Slovan Bratislava	3	(0)
2013	San Luis Quillota	9	(1)
2013–	Unión Aconquija	21	(8)
- * Club domestic league appearances and goals as of 23 April 2015

Leandro Adrian Ledesma (born 15 March 1987) is an Argentine football forward, who plays for Unión Aconquija.

== ŠK Slovan Bratislava ==
On 26 September 2012, Ledesma, also known as Coco signed half-year contract with Slovan Bratislava. In December 2012, he did not extend his contract.
