= Brian Blasi =

Argentine professional footballer

Personal information
- Full name: Brian Rolando Blasi
- Date of birth: 8 February 1996 (age 30)
- Place of birth: Monte Vera, Argentina
- Height: 1.80 m (5 ft 11 in)
- Positions: Right-back; centre-back

Team information
- Current team: Alvarado
- Number: 2

Youth career
- 2007–2015: Unión Santa Fe

Senior career*
Years	Team	Apps	(Gls)
2015–2022	Unión Santa Fe	54	(2)
2022	Barracas Central	8	(0)
2023	Central Córdoba SdE	27	(0)
2024	Nacional	18	(1)
2024	Gimnasia LP	0	(0)
2025–	Alvarado	13	(0)
- * Club domestic league appearances and goals as of 17:56, 21 May 2025 (UTC)

Brian Rolando Blasi (born 8 February 1996) is an Argentine professional footballer who plays as a right-back or centre-back for Primera Nacional side Alvarado.

== Career ==
Unión Santa Fe signed Blasi in 2007. His senior career began with them in 2015, first appearing in the squad in November when he was an unused substitute versus Estudiantes. His debut arrived on 20 May 2017, he played the full duration of a home defeat to Arsenal de Sarandí in the Argentine Primera División. He made five appearances during 2016–17, the last arriving on 25 June against Boca Juniors; he scored his first senior goal in the process.

In June 2022, Blasi joined Barracas Central.

== Career statistics ==
As of 26 May 2018.

Club statistics
Club	Season	League			Cup (Note: Includes the Copa Argentina)		League Cup		Continental		Other		Total	
Club	Season	Division	Apps	Goals	Apps	Goals	Apps	Goals	Apps	Goals	Apps	Goals	Apps	Goals
Unión Santa Fe	2015	Primera División	0	0	0	0	—		—		0	0	0	0
Unión Santa Fe	2016	Primera División	0	0	0	0	—		—		0	0	0	0
Unión Santa Fe	2016–17	Primera División	5	1	1	0	—		—		0	0	6	1
Unión Santa Fe	2017–18	Primera División	8	0	1	0	—		—		0	0	9	0
Career total			13	1	2	0	—		—		0	0	15	1
