= Oscar Altamirano =

Argentine footballer

Personal information
- Full name: Oscar Alberto Altamirano
- Date of birth: January 9, 1978 (age 48)
- Place of birth: Buenos Aires, Argentina
- Height: 1.87 m (6 ft 2 in)
- Position: Striker

Team information
- Current team: JJ Urquiza

Senior career*
Years	Team	Apps	(Gls)
2000–2004	Ferro Carril Oeste	0	(0)
2004–2006	Racing de Olavarría	52	(24)
2006–2007	Grupo Universitario	22	(14)
2007–2008	Rivadavia	29	(8)
2008–2009	Ferro Carril Oeste	32	(9)
2009	Deportivo Pasto	14	(4)
2010	Universidad de Concepción	4	(0)
2010–2011	Ferro Carril Oeste	32	(8)
2011	Racing de Olavarría	3	(2)
2012	Central Norte	24	(11)
2012–2013	Racing de Olavarría	16	(18)
2013–2014	Central Norte	24	(11)
2014	Chacarita Juniors	5	(1)
2015–2016	Almagro	3	(2)
2017	Talleres de Remedios	11	(1)
2017–2019	JJ Urquiza	56	(30)
2020	El Fortín de Olavarría	1	(0)
2024–	JJ Urquiza	0	(0)
- * Club domestic league appearances and goals as of 2 May 2024

Oscar Alberto Altamirano (born January 9, 1978, in Buenos Aires) is an Argentine footballer who plays as a striker for JJ Urquiza.

== Career ==
Besides Argentina, Altamirano played for Deportivo Pasto in Colombia and Universidad de Concepción in Chile.

His last team was JJ Urquiza from the Argentine Primera B Metropolitana and El Fortín de Olavarría.

In March 2024, Altamirano returned to play by signing with JJ Urquiza.
