= Damián Martínez (footballer, born June 1990) =

Argentine footballer

Personal information
- Date of birth: 20 June 1990 (age 36)
- Place of birth: Argentina
- Position: Forward

Youth career
- Gimnasia y Esgrima
- Estudiantes
- Cambaceres

Senior career*
Years	Team	Apps	(Gls)
- Villa Montor
- CRIBA
2016–2017	Villa San Carlos	1	(0)
2017	CRIBA	13	(0)
- * Club domestic league appearances and goals

Damián Martínez (born 20 June 1990) is an Argentine footballer who plays as a forward.

== Career ==
Martínez spent time in the youth systems of Gimnasia y Esgrima, Estudiantes and Cambaceres prior to beginning his senior career with Villa Montor in the Liga Amateur Platense. He subsequently joined CRIBA, before joining Primera B Metropolitana side Villa San Carlos on 26 July 2016. He made his professional debut on 17 October in a home defeat to Colegiales. In 2017, Martínez rejoined CRIBA; now of Torneo Federal B.

== Career statistics ==
As of 8 July 2020.

Club statistics
Club	Season	League			Cup		League Cup		Continental		Other		Total	
Club	Season	Division	Apps	Goals	Apps	Goals	Apps	Goals	Apps	Goals	Apps	Goals	Apps	Goals
Villa San Carlos	2016–17	Primera B Metropolitana	1	0	0	0	—		—		0	0	1	0
CRIBA	2017	Torneo Federal B	13	0	0	0	—		—		0	0	13	0
Career total			14	0	0	0	—		—		0	0	14	0
