= Sebastián Moyano (footballer) =

Argentine footballer

Personal information
- Full name: Sebastián Emanuel Moyano
- Date of birth: 26 August 1990 (age 36)
- Place of birth: Mendoza, Argentina
- Height: 1.88 m (6 ft 2 in)
- Position: Goalkeeper

Team information
- Current team: Aldosivi
- Number: 17

Youth career
- Centro Deportivo Rivadavia
- 2006–2011: Godoy Cruz

Senior career*
Years	Team	Apps	(Gls)
2011–2017	Godoy Cruz	31	(0)
2017–2018	Aldosivi	27	(0)
2018–2019	Gimnasia y Esgrima	3	(0)
2019–2023	Unión Santa Fe	101	(0)
2024	Barracas Central	24	(0)
2025–	Aldosivi	0	(0)
- * Club domestic league appearances and goals as of 17:04, 25 July 2025 (UTC)

Sebastián Emanuel Moyano (born 26 August 1990) is an Argentine professional footballer who plays as a goalkeeper for Aldosivi.

== Career ==
Moyano's youth was spent with Centro Deportivo Rivadavia and Godoy Cruz. He began featuring for Godoy Cruz in September 2011 when he was an unused substitute for league games against All Boys and Newell's Old Boys. After further unused sub appearances in 2012–13, Moyano made his senior debut on 17 June 2013 against Quilmes. Thirty more appearances followed for Moyano across the next three seasons. In July 2017, after not featuring for Godoy Cruz since 13 May 2015, Moyano left the club to join Aldosivi in Primera B Nacional. His first appearance came in a Copa Argentina loss to Vélez Sarsfield on 4 September.

After achieving promotion with Aldosivi in 2017–18, Moyano departed at the conclusion of the campaign to join subsequent league counterparts Gimnasia y Esgrima.

== Career statistics ==
As of 5 September 2018.

Club statistics
Club	Season	League			Cup (Note: Includes the Copa Argentina)		League Cup		Continental (Note: Includes the Copa Libertadores and Copa Sudamericana)		Other		Total	
Club	Season	Division	Apps	Goals	Apps	Goals	Apps	Goals	Apps	Goals	Apps	Goals	Apps	Goals
Godoy Cruz	2010–11	Primera División	0	0	0	0	—		0	0	0	0	0	0
Godoy Cruz	2011–12	Primera División	0	0	0	0	—		0	0	0	0	0	0
Godoy Cruz	2012–13	Primera División	1	0	0	0	—		—		0	0	1	0
Godoy Cruz	2013–14	Primera División	3	0	1	0	—		—		0	0	4	0
Godoy Cruz	2014	Primera División	19	0	1	0	—		2 (Note: Two appearances in 2014 Copa Sudamericana)	0	0	0	22	0
Godoy Cruz	2015	Primera División	8	0	1	0	—		—		0	0	9	0
Godoy Cruz	2016	Primera División	0	0	0	0	—		—		0	0	0	0
Godoy Cruz	2016–17	Primera División	0	0	0	0	—		0	0	0	0	0	0
Godoy Cruz	Total		31	0	3	0	—		2	0	0	0	36	0
Aldosivi	2017–18	Primera B Nacional	23	0	1	0	—		—		1 (Note: One appearance in 2017–18 Primera B Nacional play-offs)	0	25	0
Gimnasia y Esgrima	2018–19	Primera División	0	0	0	0	—		—		0	0	0	0
Career total			54	0	4	0	—		2	0	1	0	61	0

== Honours ==
Aldosivi

- Primera B Nacional: 2017–18
