= Club Atlético Douglas Haig =

Douglas Haig
- Full name: Club Atlético Douglas Haig
- Nicknames: Fogoneros; Carasucias; Rojinegros; El Milan de Pergamino
- Founded: 18 November 1918; 107 years ago
- Ground: Miguel Morales, Pergamino
- Capacity: 16,000
- Chairman: Javier Martínez
- Manager: Andrés Guglielminpietro
- League: Torneo Federal A
- 2024: Round of 32
- Website: https://douglashaig.com/
Home colours	Away colours	Third colours

Club Atlético Douglas Haig is an Argentine football club from Pergamino, Buenos Aires Province, which plays in Torneo Federal A, the third division of football in Argentina.

The club is named after Field Marshal Sir Douglas Haig, a victorious British general from World War I.

== History ==
In November 1918 a group of British workers on the Argentinian Central Railroad decided to set up a football team to take part in the local soccer championship. This required the consent and support of the Chief of the railway, Mr. Ronald Leslie, who, requested that the new club name itself in honour of Sir Douglas Haig, the Commander-in-Chief of the British Armies in Western Europe. Club Atlético Douglas Haig was thereby founded on 18 November 1918.

From 2000 to 2007 the club played in Torneo Argentino A, the country's third division, being relegated in 2007 to the fourth division, where they played for three seasons until returning to the third division in 2010.

On 14 May 2012, the club won the 2011–12 Torneo Argentino A championship and achieved promotion to the second division for the first time in 13 years. In their first season back, the 2012–13 season, Douglas Haid finished 11th out of 20. Douglas Haig played in this division until their relegation in the 2016–17 season.

== Players ==
=== Current squad ===
Current squad of Club Atlético Douglas Haig as of 2 April 2026 (edit)
Sources: BDFA

- Carrera
- Perrone
- Auil
- Pezzi
- López
- Canela
- Mauri
- Cuello
- Caballo
- Meza
- Gómez
- Ojeda
- Seratto
- Giménez
- Castellano
- Pereira
- Magnago
- Ponce de León
- Arriola
- Cabalucci
- Tus
- Orlando
- Palacio
- González
- Fiorito
- Rosciano
- Reta
- Manager: Bastianini

== Honours ==
=== National ===
- Torneo Argentino A (1): 2011–12
- Torneo Argentino B (1): 2009–10

=== Regional ===
- Liga de Pergamino (26): 1920, 1922, 1923, 1924, 1927, 1928, 1933, 1934, 1935, 1936, 1950, 1962, 1964,
  1966, 1979, 1980, 1981, 1982, 1983, 1984, 1985, 2000, 2001, 2002, 2003, 2010
- Torneo de la Provincia de Buenos Aires (1): 1986 (Note: Tournament created to promote one team from Buenos Aires Province to recently created Primera B Nacional. Douglas Haig won the championship defeating Olimpo de Bahía Blanca at the finals.)
