= Emmanuel Giménez =

Argentine footballer

Personal information
- Full name: Emmanuel Giménez
- Date of birth: 19 February 1984 (age 42)
- Place of birth: Córdoba, Argentina
- Height: 1.66 m (5 ft 5 in)
- Position: Midfielder

Team information
- Current team: Central Norte

Senior career*
| Years | Team | Apps | (Gls) |
| 2003–2007 | Talleres de Córdoba | 72 | (1) |
| 2005–2006 | → Atlético Rafaela (loan) | 30 | (0) |
| 2008 | Gimnasia de Jujuy | 3 | (0) |
| 2009–2010 | Santamarina | 61 | (6) |
| 2011 | Estudiantes BA | 27 | (6) |
| 2011 | Atlético Los Dorados | 31 | (3) |
| 2012 | Juventud Antoniana | 25 | (4) |
| 2012–2013 | Temperley | 35 | (4) |
| 2013–2014 | Santamarina | 24 | (4) |
| 2014–2015 | Deportes Antofagasta | 10 | (0) |
| 2015 | Unión de Mar del Plata | 34 | (5) |
| 2016–2018 | Deportivo Morón | 32 | (6) |
| 2018–2019 | Estudiantes de San Luis | 42 | (1) |
| 2020 | Agropecuario | 1 | (0) |
| 2020 | Chaco For Ever | 6 | (1) |
| 2021–2023 | Racing Córdoba | 75 | (2) |
| 2024– | Central Norte | 39 | (3) |
- * Club domestic league appearances and goals as of 16:59, 21 July 2025 (UTC)

Emmanuel Giménez (born 19 February 1984) is an Argentine footballer for Central Norte.
