= Nelson Acevedo =

Argentine footballer (born 1988)

Personal information
- Full name: Nelson Fernando Acevedo
- Date of birth: 11 July 1988 (age 38)
- Place of birth: Resistencia, Argentina
- Height: 1.71 m (5 ft 7 in)
- Position: Midfielder

Team information
- Current team: Sarmiento

Youth career
- Defensa y Justicia

Senior career*
Years	Team	Apps	(Gls)
2009–2014	Defensa y Justicia	101	(4)
2014–2018	Racing	24	(0)
2015–2017	→ Unión Santa Fe (loan)	57	(2)
2018–2021	Unión Santa Fe	50	(0)
2020	→ Defensa y Justicia (loan)	11	(0)
2021–2022	Godoy Cruz	32	(0)
2023	La Calera	8	(0)
2023–2024	Tacuary	35	(0)
2025–2026	Talleres RdE	21	(0)
2026–	Sarmiento	0	(0)
- * Club domestic league appearances and goals as of 09:35, 20 March 2026 (UTC)

Nelson Fernando Acevedo (born 11 July 1988) is an Argentine professional footballer who plays as a midfielder for Torneo Federal A club Sarmiento.

== Career ==
=== Club ===
Acevedo began his professional career in the Argentine second division, the Primera B Nacional, with Defensa y Justicia. He made his first-team debut for the team towards the end of the 2008–09 Primera B Nacional season, with his first match coming against Platense. He played three games in total in 2008–09. In the following season he played 18 times in the league before making just one Primera B Nacional appearance in 2010–11, against Almirante Brown in a game where he was sent off, and seven in 2011–12. He featured much more in his next two seasons (2012–13 and 2013–14) as he participated in 72 league matches and scored four goals. 2013–14 proved to be Acevedo's final season with Defensa y Justicia but it ended on a high as the club finished second to gain promotion into the 2014 Argentine Primera División.

As Defensa y Justicia moved up a division, Acevedo did too as he agreed to join Racing Club de Avellaneda in July 2014. His Racing debut actually came against his former club, Defensa y Justicia, on 9 August 2014 as his new side beat his old one 1–3. 13 appearances followed for him in 2014 before he played 10 times in 2015. Ahead of the 2016 season, Acevedo was loaned to Unión Santa Fe. Just like his debut for Racing, his Unión debut came against former club Defensa y Justicia; this time the match ended 2–2. He scored his first goal for Unión on 7 May 2016 versus Argentinos Juniors. In July 2018, he signed a two-year permanent contract with Union. On 20 January 2020, Acevedo was loaned out to his former club Defensa y Justicia for one year.

In the summer 2021, Acevedo signed a 1,5-year deal with Godoy Cruz.

== Career statistics ==
=== Club ===
As of 7 June 2025.

Club statistics
Club	Division	League			Cup		Continental		Total	
Club	Division	Season	Apps	Goals	Apps	Goals	Apps	Goals	Apps	Goals
Defensa y Justicia	Primera B Nacional	2008–09	3	0	—		—		3	0
Defensa y Justicia	Primera B Nacional	2009–10	17	0	—		—		17	0
Defensa y Justicia	Primera B Nacional	2010–11	1	0	—		—		1	0
Defensa y Justicia	Primera B Nacional	2011–12	7	0	1	0	—		8	0
Defensa y Justicia	Primera B Nacional	2012–13	32	1	1	0	—		33	1
Defensa y Justicia	Primera B Nacional	2013–14	40	3	1	0	—		41	3
Defensa y Justicia	Argentine Primera División	2019–20	6	0	—		1	0	7	0
Defensa y Justicia	Argentine Primera División	2020	—		5	0	9	0	14	0
Defensa y Justicia	Total		106	4	8	0	10	0	124	4
Racing	Argentine Primera División	2014	14	0	—		—		14	0
Racing	Argentine Primera División	2015	10	0	2	0	2	0	14	0
Racing	Total		24	0	2	0	2	0	28	0
Unión Santa Fe	Argentine Primera División	2016	13	1	1	0	—		14	1
Unión Santa Fe	Argentine Primera División	2016–17	17	1	3	1	—		20	2
Unión Santa Fe	Argentine Primera División	2017–18	27	0	3	0	—		30	0
Unión Santa Fe	Argentine Primera División	2018–19	23	0	1	0	2	0	26	0
Unión Santa Fe	Argentine Primera División	2019–20	15	0	—		—		15	0
Unión Santa Fe	Argentine Primera División	2021	—		12	0	—		12	0
Unión Santa Fe	Total		95	2	20	1	2	0	117	3
Godoy Cruz	Argentine Primera División	2021	23	0	2	0	—		25	0
Godoy Cruz	Argentine Primera División	2022	19	0	18	0	—		37	0
Godoy Cruz	Total		42	0	20	0	0	0	62	0
La Calera	Chilean Primera División	2023	8	0	1	0	—		9	0
Tacuary	Paraguayan Primera División	2023	18	0	0	0	—		18	0
Tacuary	Paraguayan Primera División	2024	17	0	0	0	—		17	0
Tacuary	Total		35	0	0	0	0	0	35	0
Talleres (RE)	Primera B Nacional	2025	8	0	—		—		8	0
Career total			318	6	51	1	14	0	383	7

== Honours ==
=== Club ===
Racing Club de Avellaneda

- Argentine Primera División (1): 2014
