= Damián Martínez (footballer, born January 1990) =

Argentine footballer

Personal information
- Full name: Damián Alberto Martínez
- Date of birth: 31 January 1990 (age 36)
- Place of birth: Buenos Aires, Argentina
- Height: 1.77 m (5 ft 9 1/2 in)
- Position: Right-back

Team information
- Current team: Barracas Central
- Number: 4

Youth career
- San Lorenzo

Senior career*
Years	Team	Apps	(Gls)
2009–2013	San Lorenzo	13	(0)
2011	→ Indep. Rivadavia (loan)	32	(1)
2013–2014	Aldosivi	33	(4)
2014–2016	Defensa y Justicia	55	(1)
2016–2019	Independiente	2	(0)
2017–2019	→ Unión Santa Fe (loan)	45	(2)
2019–2020	Unión Santa Fe	13	(0)
2020–2025	Rosario Central	133	(8)
2025–2026	Atlético Tucumán	27	(0)
2026–	Barracas Central	10	(1)

International career
2007	Argentina U17	12	(1)
- * Club domestic league appearances and goals as of 16:57, 3 June 2026 (UTC)

Damián Alberto Martínez is an Argentine professional footballer who plays as a right-back for Barracas Central in the Argentine Primera División.

== Career ==
=== Club ===
Martínez started his career with San Lorenzo in 2009, making his professional debut on 3 April in an Argentine Primera División match with Arsenal de Sarandí. That was one of nine appearances for San Lorenzo between 2009 and 2010. In 2011, Martínez was loaned out to Independiente Rivadavia of Primera B Nacional. He remained for two seasons, 2010–11 and 2011–12, and scored one goal (versus Boca Unidos) in thirty-two matches. He returned to San Lorenzo in 2012 and subsequently made two more appearances, prior to leaving permanently to sign for Primera B Nacional's Aldosivi in 2013.

He scored in his first start for Aldosivi, in a 2–2 tie with Independiente on 17 August 2013. In total, Martínez featured thirty-three times for Aldosivi throughout the 2013–14 campaign. In June 2014, Martínez joined Argentine Primera División side Defensa y Justicia. Three years later, after scoring once in fifty-five matches for the club, he left Defensa y Justicia to play for fellow top-flight team Independiente. His first appearance for Independiente came against Defensa y Justicia on 8 August 2016, in a home defeat in the Copa Argentina. On 2 August 2017, Unión Santa Fe loaned Martínez for 2017–18.

=== International ===
Martínez won twelve caps and scored one goal, versus Paraguay, for the Argentina U17 team in 2007. He was selected for the 2007 South American Under-17 Football Championship in Ecuador and the 2007 FIFA U-17 World Cup in South Korea.

== Career statistics ==
As of 8 May 2018.

Club statistics
Club	Season	League			Cup (Note: Includes the Copa Argentina)		League Cup		Continental (Note: Includes the Copa Libertadores and Copa Sudamericana)		Other (Note: Includes the Argentine Primera División play-offs)		Total	
Club	Season	Division	Apps	Goals	Apps	Goals	Apps	Goals	Apps	Goals	Apps	Goals	Apps	Goals
San Lorenzo	2008–09	Primera División	3	0	0	0	—		0	0	0	0	3	0
San Lorenzo	2009–10	Primera División	6	0	0	0	—		0	0	0	0	6	0
San Lorenzo	2010–11	Primera División	0	0	0	0	—		—		0	0	0	0
San Lorenzo	2011–12	Primera División	3	0	0	0	—		—		2 (Note: Two appearances in 2011–12 Argentine Primera División play-offs)	0	5	0
San Lorenzo	2012–13	Primera División	1	0	0	0	—		—		0	0	1	0
San Lorenzo	Total		13	0	0	0	—		0	0	2	0	15	0
Independiente Rivadavia (loan)	2010–11	Primera B Nacional	17	1	0	0	—		—		0	0	17	1
Independiente Rivadavia (loan)	2011–12	Primera B Nacional	15	0	3	0	—		—		0	0	18	0
Independiente Rivadavia (loan)	Total		32	1	3	0	—		—		0	0	35	1
Aldosivi	2013–14	Primera B Nacional	33	4	0	0	—		—		0	0	33	4
Defensa y Justicia	2014	Primera División	17	0	2	0	—		—		0	0	19	0
Defensa y Justicia	2015	Primera División	24	0	3	0	—		—		0	0	27	0
Defensa y Justicia	2016	Primera División	14	1	1	0	—		—		0	0	15	1
Defensa y Justicia	Total		55	1	6	0	—		—		0	0	61	1
Independiente	2016–17	Primera División	2	0	1	0	—		1 (Note: One appearance in 2016 Copa Sudamericana)	0	0	0	4	0
Independiente	2017–18	Primera División	0	0	0	0	—		0	0	0	0	0	0
Independiente	Total		2	0	0	0	—		1	0	0	0	3	0
Unión Santa Fe (loan)	2017–18	Primera División	23	0	2	0	—		—		0	0	25	0
Career total			158	6	12	0	—		1	0	2	0	173	6
