= 2019–20 Club Atlético Patronato season =

Patronato
2019–20 season
- President: José Gómez
- Manager: Mario Sciacqua
- Stadium: Estadio Presbítero Bartolomé Grella
- Copa Argentina: Round of 32
- Top goalscorer: League: Christian Chimino (1); Gabriel Ávalos; Hugo Silveira; Julián Chicco; Lautaro Comas; All: Christian Chimino (1); Gabriel Ávalos; Hugo Silveira; Julián Chicco; Lautaro Comas

The 2019–20 season is Patronato's 5th consecutive season in the top division of Argentine football. In addition to the Primera División, the club are competing in the Copa Argentina and Copa de la Superliga.

The season generally covers the period from 1 July 2019 to 30 June 2020.

== Review ==
=== Pre-season ===
Patronato announced their first two signings in early June 2019. Leandro Marín signed from Lausanne-Sport on 6 June, while Lucas Mancinelli made the move from Temperley on 12 June - with both players officially joining on 3 July. The club's first outgoing was revealed on 17 June, with Swiss centre-back Dylan Gissi signing for Atlético Tucumán. Mathías Abero did the opposite on 19 June, as the Uruguayan penned terms from the San Miguel de Tucumán outfit. Patronato completed the loan capture of central midfielder Julián Chicco from Boca Juniors on 21 June, he was followed in hours later by Christian Chimino from Huracán. Ezequiel Rescaldani left on the same day, joining Arsenal de Sarandí. Also on 21 June, Federico Mancinelli became signing number six.

Cristian Tarragona joined Patronato on 22 June, with the centre-forward coming from Platense in Primera B Nacional. They played their first pre-season friendly later that day, defeating Unión Santa Fe Reserves at home thanks to a Gabriel Ávalos goal. Ignacio Cacheiro and Federico Bravo departed on 24/25 June, penning contracts with Chacarita Juniors and Atlético Tucumán. They and Godoy Cruz drew in an exhibition fixture on 29 June, with a secondary encounter ending in a Godoy win. Matías Ibáñez was loaned from Lanús, while Gabriel Díaz was transferred from Ferro Carril Oeste on 29 June. However, Ferro later announced a deal was still being negotiated amid a new contract offer. Pablo Cortizo signed from Gimnasia y Esgrima (M) on 30 June.

Francisco Apaolaza's loan in from the previous season officially expired on 30 June. Lucas Ceballos moved to Mitre on 1 July, with Santiago Rosales coming into the team on loan from Racing Club later in the day. The incoming of Gabriel Díaz was made formal on 1 July, as Ferro communicated he had signed a new contract but would be loaned to Patronato. Gabriel Carabajal was sold to domestic rivals Unión Santa Fe on 4 July. Cristian Tarragona netted for the first time for Patronato on 4 July in a friendly with Colón. Agustín Guiffrey went on loan to Santamarina on 4 July. On 7 July, Renzo Vera headed off to Gimnasia y Esgrima (M). Banfield were defeated in pre-season on 9 July, in an encounter that followed a goalless draw between them earlier in the day.

Hugo Silveira, a Uruguayan centre-forward from Nacional, joined the club on 11 July. Patronato held Lanús to a friendly draw on 13 July, prior to beating them in a second fixture. Patronato made their thirteenth new signing on 16 July in Dardo Miloc from Aldosivi. Bruno Duarte went away on 17 July, deciding to sign for Tristán Suárez. Also on that date, Patronato had two goalless ties with Talleres in friendlies while Agustín Sandona left for Blooming in Bolivia. 25 July saw Jacobo Mansilla head to Gimnasia y Esgrima (M) in Primera B Nacional.

=== July ===
Patronato kicked off their 2019–20 Primera División campaign with a victory over Colón at the Estadio Brigadier General Estanislao López, as Christian Chimino scored on his debut for them on 27 July.

=== August ===
Agustín Sufi arrived on a free transfer from Gimnasia y Esgrima (J) on 1 August, with Nicolás Delgadillo coming in on loan from Vélez Sarsfield soon after. Patronato's Copa Argentina encounter with Independiente was postponed, due to their opponent's disagreements with CONMEBOL in regards to their Copa Sudamericana quarter-final tie. Patronato lost 2–0 to Boca Juniors on 4 August, after strikes from Eduardo Salvio and Carlos Tevez. Patronato beat Ateneo Inmaculada in a friendly on 7 August. Patronato, on 9 August, beat and lost to Colón Reserves in exhibitions. Lautaro Geminiani and Abel Peralta left for Independiente Rivadavia and Sarmiento on 13 August. Patronato made it two wins from three in the Primera División on 18 August, defeating Huracán.

Nicolás Pantaleone went to Uruguay with Danubio on 22 August. Patronato's first draw of the season came on 24 August, with the club taking a point off Rosario Central away from home. Patronato were eliminated from the Copa Argentina on 28 August, as Domingo Blanco netted for Independiente in Villa Mercedes. The two met again in the league days later, with Patronato managing to reverse the scoreline for three points.

== Squad ==
Squad No.	Nationality	Name	Position(s)	Date of Birth (age)	Signed from					
Goalkeepers
1	Argentina	Franco Rivasseau	GK	10 July 1997 (age 29)	Academy					
12	Argentina	Matías Ibáñez	GK	16 December 1986 (age 39)	Lanús (loan)					
21	Argentina	Federico Costa	GK	8 October 1988 (age 38)	Talleres					
	Argentina	Emanuel Alarcón	GK	11 November 1992 (age 34)	Academy					
Defenders
2	Argentina	Walter Andrade	CB	1 December 1984 (age 41)	Atletico Hernandarias					
4	Argentina	Christian Chimino	RB	9 February 1988 (age 38)	Huracán					
5	Argentina	Leandro Marín	RB	22 January 1992 (age 34)	Lausanne-Sport					
6	Argentina	Matías Escudero	CB	15 December 1988 (age 37)	San Martín					
15	Argentina	Martín Aruga	LB	4 October 1998 (age 28)	Academy					
16	Uruguay	Mathías Abero	LB	9 April 1990 (age 36)	Atlético Tucumán					
20	Argentina	Brian Negro	DF	8 September 1997 (age 29)	Academy					
22	Argentina	Federico Mancinelli	CB	8 May 1982 (age 44)	Huracán					
23	Argentina	Bruno Urribarri	LB	6 November 1986 (age 40)	Tigre					
34	Argentina	Gabriel Díaz	DF	17 October 1989 (age 37)	Ferro Carril Oeste (loan)					
42	Argentina	Mateo Komar	CB	7 April 1998 (age 28)	Academy					
	Argentina	Marcos Minetti	CB	17 April 1989 (age 37)	Academy					
Midfielders
7	Argentina	Lautaro Comas	AM	15 January 1995 (age 31)	Academy					
8	Argentina	Gabriel Compagnucci	AM	29 August 1991 (age 35)	Unión Santa Fe					
11	Argentina	Santiago Briñone	CM	28 December 1996 (age 29)	Academy					
13	Argentina	Brian Nievas	MF	28 April 1998 (age 28)	Academy					
17	Argentina	Pablo Cortizo	RM	1 September 1989 (age 37)	Gimnasia y Esgrima (M)					
19	Argentina	Agustín Pastorelli	MF	1999	Academy					
24	Argentina	Damián Lemos	DM	31 January 1989 (age 37)	Nueva Chicago					
27	Argentina	Pablo Ledesma	RM	4 February 1984 (age 42)	Colón					
30	Argentina	Santiago Rosales	AM	22 March 1995 (age 31)	Racing Club (loan)					
31	Argentina	Julián Chicco	CM	13 January 1998 (age 28)	Boca Juniors (loan)					
32	Argentina	Dardo Miloc	CM	16 October 1990 (age 36)	Aldosivi					
33	Argentina	Lucas Mancinelli	RM	6 July 1989 (age 37)	Temperley					
	Argentina	Enzo Quinteros	MF	25 April 1998 (age 28)	Academy					
	Argentina	Agustín Sufi	MF	26 January 1995 (age 31)	Gimnasia y Esgrima (J)					
Forwards
9	Argentina	Cristian Tarragona	CF	9 April 1991 (age 35)	Platense					
10	Uruguay	Hugo Silveira	CF	23 May 1993 (age 33)	Nacional					
18	Argentina	José Barreto	FW	22 February 2000 (age 26)	Academy					
37	Argentina	Faustino Dettler	AM	11 June 1998 (age 28)	Academy					
39	Paraguay	Gabriel Ávalos	CF	12 October 1990 (age 36)	Godoy Cruz (loan)					
41	Argentina	Luis Vásquez	FW	24 January 2001 (age 25)	Academy					
	Argentina	Nicolás Delgadillo	LW	2 October 1997 (age 29)	Vélez Sarsfield (loan)					
	Argentina	Juan Cruz Franzoni	CF	17 October 1999 (age 27)	Academy	Argentina	Joaquín Clavijo Gerlo	CF	14 January 1998 (age 28)	Academy
Out on loan					Loaned to					
40	Argentina	Agustín Guiffrey	LW	3 November 1997 (age 29)	Santamarina					

== Transfers ==
Domestic transfer windows:
3 July 2019 to 24 September 2019
20 January 2020 to 19 February 2020.

=== Transfers in ===
Date from	Position	Nationality	Name	From	Ref.
3 July 2019 (Note: Deal agreed on 6 June 2019)	RB	Argentina	Leandro Marín	Lausanne-Sport	
3 July 2019 (Note: Deal agreed on 12 June 2019)	RM	Argentina	Lucas Mancinelli	Temperley	
3 July 2019 (Note: Deal agreed on 19 June 2019)	LB	Uruguay	Mathías Abero	Atlético Tucumán	
3 July 2019 (Note: Deal agreed on 21 June 2019)	RB	Argentina	Christian Chimino	Huracán	
3 July 2019 (Note: Deal agreed on 21 June 2019)	CB	Argentina	Federico Mancinelli	Huracán	
3 July 2019 (Note: Deal agreed on 22 June 2019)	CF	Argentina	Cristian Tarragona	Platense	
3 July 2019 (Note: Deal agreed on 30 June 2019)	RM	Argentina	Pablo Cortizo	Gimnasia y Esgrima (M)	
11 July 2019	CF	Uruguay	Hugo Silveira	Nacional	
16 July 2019	CM	Argentina	Dardo Miloc	Aldosivi	
1 August 2019	MF	Argentina	Agustín Sufi	Gimnasia y Esgrima (J)	

=== Transfers out ===
Date from	Position	Nationality	Name	To	Ref.
3 July 2019 (Note: Deal agreed on 19 June 2019)	CB	Switzerland	Dylan Gissi	Atlético Tucumán	
3 July 2019 (Note: Deal agreed on 21 June 2019)	CF	Argentina	Ezequiel Rescaldani	Arsenal de Sarandí	
3 July 2019 (Note: Deal agreed on 24 June 2019)	RW	Argentina	Ignacio Cacheiro	Chacarita Juniors	
3 July 2019 (Note: Deal agreed on 25 June 2019)	CM	Argentina	Federico Bravo	Atlético Tucumán	
3 July 2019 (Note: Deal agreed on 1 July 2019)	RB	Argentina	Lucas Ceballos	Mitre	
4 July 2019	RM	Argentina	Gabriel Carabajal	Unión Santa Fe	
7 July 2019	RB	Argentina	Renzo Vera	Gimnasia y Esgrima (M)	
17 July 2019	DF	Argentina	Bruno Duarte	Tristán Suárez	
17 July 2019	CB	Argentina	Agustín Sandona	Blooming	
25 July 2019	LM	Argentina	Jacobo Mansilla	Gimnasia y Esgrima (M)	
13 August 2019	RB	Argentina	Lautaro Geminiani	Sarmiento	
13 August 2019	RM	Argentina	Abel Peralta	Independiente Rivadavia	
22 August 2019	LB	Argentina	Nicolás Pantaleone	Danubio	

=== Loans in ===
Start date	Position	Nationality	Name	From	End date	Ref.
3 July 2019 (Note: Deal agreed on 21 June 2019)	CM	Argentina	Julián Chicco	Boca Juniors	30 June 2020	
3 July 2019 (Note: Deal agreed on 29 June 2019)	GK	Argentina	Matías Ibáñez	Lanús	30 June 2020	
3 July 2019 (Note: Deal agreed on 1 July 2019)	DF	Argentina	Gabriel Díaz	Ferro Carril Oeste	30 June 2020	
3 July 2019 (Note: Deal agreed on 1 July 2019)	AM	Argentina	Santiago Rosales	Racing Club	30 June 2020	
1 August 2019	LW	Argentina	Nicolás Delgadillo	Vélez Sarsfield	30 June 2020	

=== Loans out ===
Start date	Position	Nationality	Name	To	End date	Ref.
4 July 2019	LW	Argentina	Agustín Guiffrey	Santamarina	30 June 2020	

== Friendlies ==
=== Pre-season ===
On 15 June 2019, Patronato announced friendlies with Unión Santa Fe Reserves, Godoy Cruz, Colón, Banfield and Lanús - with the first two taking place at the Estadio Presbítero Bartolomé Grella in Paraná, while the other three would see trips to Santa Fe and Buenos Aires. Exhibition encounters with Talleres were added to their schedule on 11 July.

Win Draw Loss

22 June 2019 Friendly	Patronato	1–0	Unión Santa Fe Reserves	Paraná, Argentina
10:00 GMT-3	G. Ávalos 10'	Patronato; SuperDeportivo; 70 min. match		Stadium: Estadio Presbítero Bartolomé Grella

29 June 2019 Friendly	Patronato	1–1	Godoy Cruz	Paraná, Argentina
10:00 GMT-3	J. Barreto	Patronato; 70 min. match	S. García	Stadium: Estadio Presbítero Bartolomé Grella

29 June 2019 Friendly	Patronato	0–1	Godoy Cruz	Paraná, Argentina
		Godoy Cruz; 70 min. match	A. Manzur	Stadium: Estadio Presbítero Bartolomé Grella

5 July 2019 Friendly	Colón	0–1	Patronato	Santa Fe, Argentina
		Patronato; Aire de Santa Fe; 60 min. match	C. Tarragona	Stadium: Estadio Brigadier General Estanislao López

9 July 2019 Friendly	Banfield	0–0	Patronato	Banfield, Argentina
		Banfield; TyC Sports		Stadium: Estadio Florencio Sola

9 July 2019 Friendly	Banfield	2–3	Patronato	Banfield, Argentina
	C. Villagra; J. Dátolo	Banfield; TyC Sports	C. Tarragona; P. Cortizo; A. Pastorelli	Stadium: Estadio Florencio Sola

13 July 2019 Friendly	Lanús	2–2	Patronato	Ezeiza, Argentina
	J. Sand (pen.)	Patronato; InfoRegión	S. Rosales; C. Tarragona	Stadium: Complejo Deportivo de Ezeiza

13 July 2019 Friendly	Lanús	1–2	Patronato	Ezeiza, Argentina
	P. Martínez	Patronato; InfoRegión	M. Komar; F. Dettler	Stadium: Complejo Deportivo de Ezeiza

17 July 2019 Friendly	Patronato	0–0	Talleres	Paraná, Argentina
10:00 GMT-3		Patronato; Vía País		Stadium: Estadio Presbítero Bartolomé Grella

17 July 2019 Friendly	Patronato	0–0	Talleres	Paraná, Argentina
		Patronato; Vía País		Stadium: Estadio Presbítero Bartolomé Grella

=== Mid-season ===
Friendlies with Ateneo Inmaculada and Colón Reserves were scheduled on 6 August.

Win Draw Loss

7 August 2019 Friendly	Patronato	2–0	Ateneo Inmaculada	Paraná, Argentina
16:30 GMT-3	J. Franzoni; J. Barreto	Patronato		Stadium: Estadio Presbítero Bartolomé Grella

9 August 2019 Friendly	Patronato	2–0	Colón Reserves	Paraná, Argentina
10:00 GMT-3	H. Silveira; J. Chicco	Patronato; Elonce		Stadium: Estadio Presbítero Bartolomé Grella

9 August 2019 Friendly	Patronato	0–1	Colón Reserves	Paraná, Argentina
		Patronato; Elonce	G. Díaz (o.g.)	Stadium: Estadio Presbítero Bartolomé Grella

== Competitions ==
=== Primera División ===
==== League table ====
Pos	Team	Pld	W	D	L	GF	GA	GD	Pts
18	Central Córdoba (SdE)	23	6	8	9	21	29	−8	26
19	Gimnasia y Esgrima (LP)	23	6	5	12	22	23	−1	23
20	Patronato	23	5	8	10	22	34	−12	23
21	Huracán	23	5	7	11	17	27	−10	22
22	Aldosivi	23	6	4	13	20	35	−15	22

Source: AFA
Rules for classification: 1) points; 2) play-off (only if needed to decide championship); 3) goal difference; 4) goals scored; 5) head-to-head points; 6) head-to-head goal difference; 7) head-to-head goals scored.

==== Relegation table ====
Pos	Team	2017–18 Pts	2018–19 Pts	2019–20 Pts	Total Pts	Total Pld	Avg	Relegation
16	Estudiantes (LP)	36	29	6	71	57	1.246	
17	Aldosivi	—	33	4	37	30	1.233	
18	Patronato	33	26	10	69	57	1.211	
19	Newell's Old Boys	29	29	9	67	56	1.196	
20	Banfield	35	29	4	68	57	1.193	

Source: AFA

==== Results summary ====
Overall								Home						Away					
Pld	W	D	L	GF	GA	GD	Pts	W	D	L	GF	GA	GD	W	D	L	GF	GA	GD
5	3	1	1	5	4	+1	10	2	0	1	3	3	0	1	1	0	2	1	+1

Last updated: 31 August 2019.
Source: Soccerway

==== Matches ====
The fixtures for the 2019–20 campaign were released on 10 July.

Win Draw Loss

27 July 2019 1	Colón	0–1	Patronato	Santa Fe, Argentina
13:15 GMT-3		Patronato; Infobae; Soccerway	C. Chimino 34'	Stadium: Estadio Brigadier General Estanislao López; Referee: Silvio Trucco (Argentina)

4 August 2019 2	Patronato	0–2	Boca Juniors	Paraná, Argentina
20:00 GMT-3		Patronato; Infobae; Soccerway	E. Salvio 6'; C. Tevez 15'	Stadium: Estadio Presbítero Bartolomé Grella; Referee: Fernando Rapallini (Argentina)

18 August 2019 3	Patronato	2–1	Huracán	Paraná, Argentina
11:00 GMT-3	G. Ávalos 2'; H. Silveira 59'	Patronato; Infobae; Soccerway	N. Briasco-Balekian 76'	Stadium: Estadio Presbítero Bartolomé Grella; Referee: Germán Delfino (Argentina)

24 August 2019 4	Rosario Central	1–1	Patronato	Rosario, Argentina
17:45 GMT-3	M. Lovera 33'	Patronato; Infobae; Soccerway	J. Chicco 65'	Stadium: Estadio Gigante de Arroyito; Referee: Hernán Mastrángelo (Argentina)

31 August 2019 5	Patronato	1–0	Independiente	Paraná, Argentina
17:45 GMT-3	L. Comas 35'	Patronato; Infobae; Soccerway		Stadium: Estadio Presbítero Bartolomé Grella; Referee: Silvio Trucco (Argentina)

6	Aldosivi	–	Patronato	Mar del Plata, Argentina
				Stadium: Estadio José María Minella

=== Copa Argentina ===
Independiente were drawn as Patronato's round of thirty-two opponents in the Copa Argentina.

Win Draw Loss

28 August 2019 (Note: Originally set for 14 August 2019.) R32	Patronato	0–1	Independiente	Villa Mercedes, Argentina
17:00 GMT-3		Patronato; Infobae; Soccerway	D. Blanco 57'	Stadium: Estadio Único de Villa Mercedes; Referee: Nicolás Lamolina (Argentina)

=== Copa de la Superliga ===
Win Draw Loss

	–
00:00 GMT-3

== Squad statistics ==
=== Appearances and goals ===
No.	Pos.	Nationality	Name	League		Cup		League Cup		Continental		Total		Discipline		Ref
No.	Pos.	Nationality	Name	Apps	Goals	Apps	Goals	Apps	Goals	Apps	Goals	Apps	Goals	Yellow card	Red card	Ref
1	GK	Argentina	Franco Rivasseau	0	0	0	0	0	0	—		0	0	0	0	
2	CB	Argentina	Walter Andrade	2	0	0	0	0	0	—		2	0	1	0	
4	RB	Argentina	Christian Chimino	5	1	0	0	0	0	—		5	1	1	0	
5	RB	Argentina	Leandro Marín	0	0	1	0	0	0	—		1	0	1	0	
6	CB	Argentina	Matías Escudero	3	0	1	0	0	0	—		4	0	1	0	
7	AM	Argentina	Lautaro Comas	2(1)	1	1	0	0	0	—		3(1)	1	1	1	
8	AM	Argentina	Gabriel Compagnucci	4	0	0	0	0	0	—		4	0	0	0	
9	CF	Argentina	Cristian Tarragona	3(2)	0	0	0	0	0	—		3(2)	0	2	0	
10	CF	Uruguay	Hugo Silveira	2(1)	1	0	0	0	0	—		2(1)	1	0	0	
11	CM	Argentina	Santiago Briñone	0(1)	0	1	0	0	0	—		1(1)	0	0	0	
12	GK	Argentina	Matías Ibáñez	5	0	0	0	0	0	—		5	0	0	0	
13	MF	Argentina	Brian Nievas	0	0	0	0	0	0	—		0	0	0	0	
15	LB	Argentina	Martín Aruga	0	0	0	0	0	0	—		0	0	0	0	
16	LB	Uruguay	Mathías Abero	5	0	0	0	0	0	—		5	0	2	0	
17	RM	Argentina	Pablo Cortizo	0(2)	0	0	0	0	0	—		0(2)	0	0	0	
18	FW	Argentina	José Barreto	0(2)	0	1	0	0	0	—		1(2)	0	1	0	
19	MF	Argentina	Agustín Pastorelli	0	0	0	0	0	0	—		0	0	0	0	
20	DF	Argentina	Brian Negro	0	0	0	0	0	0	—		0	0	0	0	
21	GK	Argentina	Federico Costa	0	0	1	0	0	0	—		1	0	0	0	
22	CB	Argentina	Federico Mancinelli	5	0	0	0	0	0	—		5	0	0	0	
23	LB	Argentina	Bruno Urribarri	0	0	1	0	0	0	—		1	0	0	0	
24	DM	Argentina	Damián Lemos	4	0	1	0	0	0	—		5	0	1	1	
27	RM	Argentina	Pablo Ledesma	0	0	0	0	0	0	—		0	0	0	0	
30	AM	Argentina	Santiago Rosales	4	0	1	0	0	0	—		5	0	2	0	
31	CM	Argentina	Julián Chicco	3(1)	1	0	0	0	0	—		3(1)	1	1	0	
32	RB	Argentina	Dardo Miloc	1(1)	0	1	0	0	0	—		2(1)	0	2	0	
33	RM	Argentina	Lucas Mancinelli	3(2)	0	0	0	0	0	—		3(2)	0	1	0	
34	DF	Argentina	Gabriel Díaz	0	0	1	0	0	0	—		1	0	0	0	
37	AM	Argentina	Faustino Dettler	0(1)	0	0(1)	0	0	0	—		0(2)	0	0	0	
39	CF	Paraguay	Gabriel Ávalos	4	1	0	0	0	0	—		4	1	1	0	
40	LW	Argentina	Agustín Guiffrey	0	0	0	0	0	0	—		0	0	0	0	
41	FW	Argentina	Luis Vásquez	0	0	0	0	0	0	—		0	0	0	0	
42	CB	Argentina	Mateo Komar	0	0	0	0	0	0	—		0	0	0	0	
–	GK	Argentina	Emanuel Alarcón	0	0	0	0	0	0	—		0	0	0	0	
–	LW	Argentina	Nicolás Delgadillo	0	0	0	0	0	0	—		0	0	0	0	
–	CF	Argentina	Juan Cruz Franzoni	0(1)	0	0(1)	0	0	0	—		0(2)	0	0	0	
–	CB	Argentina	Marcos Minetti	0	0	0	0	0	0	—		0	0	0	0	
–	MF	Argentina	Enzo Quinteros	0	0	0	0	0	0	—		0	0	0	0	
–	MF	Argentina	Agustín Sufi	0	0	0	0	0	0	—		0	0	0	0	
Own goals				—	0	—	0	—	0	—		—	0	—	—	—
Players who left during the season
25	LB	Argentina	Nicolás Pantaleone	0	0	0	0	0	0	—		0	0	0	0	

Statistics accurate as of 31 August 2019.

=== Goalscorers ===
Rank	Pos	No.	Nat	Name	League	Cup	League Cup	Continental	Total	Ref
1	RB	4	Argentina	Christian Chimino	1	0	0	–	1	
1	CF	39	Paraguay	Gabriel Ávalos	1	0	0	–	1	
1	CF	10	Uruguay	Hugo Silveira	1	0	0	–	1	
1	CM	31	Argentina	Julián Chicco	1	0	0	–	1	
1	AM	7	Argentina	Lautaro Comas	1	0	0	–	1	
Own goals					0	0	0	–	0	
Totals					5	0	0	–	5	—
