= Agustín Pastorelli =

Argentine professional footballer

Personal information
- Full name: Walter Agustín Pastorelli
- Date of birth: 9 September 1997 (age 29)
- Place of birth: Paraná, Argentina
- Height: 1.75 m (5 ft 9 in)
- Position: Winger

Team information
- Current team: Atlético Rafaela

Youth career
- Patronato

Senior career*
Years	Team	Apps	(Gls)
2020–2021	Patronato	5	(1)
2022–2023	DEPRO	56	(4)
2024	Nueva Chicago	26	(1)
2025–	Atlético Rafaela	9	(2)
- * Club domestic league appearances and goals as of 17:41, 6 June 2025 (UTC)

Walter Agustín Pastorelli (born 9 September 1997) is an Argentine professional footballer who plays as a winger for Atlético Rafaela.

== Career ==
Pastorelli is a product of the Patronato academy, having joined at the age of eight. In mid-2018, Pastorelli signed his first professional contract with the club. However, the winger's competitive debut wouldn't occur for more than two years. He was promoted into the first-team set-up under manager Gustavo Álvarez in mid-2020, with his senior debut arriving on 19 December in a Copa de la Liga Profesional home defeat to Aldosivi; he started and played seventy-three minutes, prior to being substituted off for Santiago Briñone. He scored his first goal on 27 December in an away loss against Defensa y Justicia.

In February 2022, Pastorelli moved to Torneo Argentino A side Club Defensores de Pronunciamiento.

== Career statistics ==
As of 27 December 2020.

Appearances and goals by club, season and competition
Club	Season	League			Cup		League Cup		Continental		Other		Total	
Club	Season	Division	Apps	Goals	Apps	Goals	Apps	Goals	Apps	Goals	Apps	Goals	Apps	Goals
Patronato	2020–21 (Note: Soccerway counts Copa de la Liga Profesional appearances as league appearances.)	Primera División	2	1	0	0	0	0	—		0	0	2	1
Career total			2	1	0	0	0	0	—		0	0	2	1
