= José Barreto =

José Barreto may refer to:

- José Barreto (Brazilian footballer) (born 1976), Brazilian football striker
- José Barreto (Argentine footballer) (born 2000), Argentine football forward
