= Osvaldo Ramírez =

Osvaldo Ramírez may refer to:

- Osvaldo Ramírez (footballer, born 1984), Argentine footballer
- Osvaldo Ramírez (footballer, born 1997), American soccer player

== See also ==
- Oswaldo Ramírez (born 1947), Peruvian footballer
- Osvaldo Ramírez García (1921–1962), Cuban revolutionary and dissident
