= Cortizo =

Cortizo is a Hispanic surname. Notable people with the surname include:

- Jordi Cortizo (born 1996), Mexican footballer
- Laurentino Cortizo (born 1953), Panamanian politician and businessman
- Pablo Cortizo (born 1989), Argentine footballer
