= Mateo García (disambiguation) =

Mateo García may refer to:

- Mateo García Pumacagua (1740–1815), Peruvian revolutionary
- Mateo García de los Reyes (1872–1936), Spanish naval officer and politician
- Mateo García Elizondo (born 1987), Mexican writer
- Mateo Ezequiel García (born 1996), Argentine footballer
- Mateo Garcia (born 2002), French rugby union player
- Mateo García Franzotti (born 2003), Argentine footballer
