= Agustín Sufi =

Argentine footballer

Personal information
- Full name: Agustín Emiliano Sufi
- Date of birth: 26 January 1995 (age 31)
- Place of birth: Monterrico, Argentina
- Height: 1.71 m (5 ft 7 in)
- Position: Left winger

Team information
- Current team: Central Norte

Youth career
- Gimnasia Jujuy

Senior career*
Years	Team	Apps	(Gls)
2013–2019	Gimnasia Jujuy	78	(9)
2013–2014	→ Monterrico (loan)	10	(0)
2019–2020	Patronato	0	(0)
2020	Santamarina	5	(0)
2021	Fénix de Pilar	15	(1)
2022–	Central Norte	9	(0)
- * Club domestic league appearances and goals as of 20:10, 2 August 2022 (UTC)

Agustín Emiliano Sufi (born 26 January 1995) is an Argentine professional footballer who plays as a left winger for Central Norte.

== Career ==
Sufi's career began in Gimnasia y Esgrima's system. He was loaned to Torneo Argentino B's Monterrico in 2013–14, subsequently appearing ten times before returning to his parent club. After eleven appearances for Gimnasia y Esgrima across the 2014 and 2015 campaigns, which included his professional bow against San Martín in August 2014, Sufi netted his opening senior goals on 6 March 2016 as he scored a brace in a 4–3 win over Boca Unidos. He scored four goals across seventeen appearances in the 2016 Primera B Nacional season. Sufi spent 2019–20 with Patronato, but wouldn't appear at first-team level.

Sufi returned to Primera B Nacional in August 2020, agreeing terms with Santamarina. After spending the 2021 season at Fénix de Pilar, Sufi moved to Central Norte in February 2022.

== Career statistics ==
As of 25 August 2020.

Club statistics
Club	Season	League			Cup		League Cup		Continental		Other		Total	
Club	Season	Division	Apps	Goals	Apps	Goals	Apps	Goals	Apps	Goals	Apps	Goals	Apps	Goals
Gimnasia y Esgrima	2013–14	Primera B Nacional	0	0	0	0	—		—		0	0	0	0
Gimnasia y Esgrima	2014	Primera B Nacional	3	0	0	0	—		—		0	0	3	0
Gimnasia y Esgrima	2015	Primera B Nacional	8	0	0	0	—		—		0	0	8	0
Gimnasia y Esgrima	2016	Primera B Nacional	17	6	1	0	—		—		0	0	18	6
Gimnasia y Esgrima	2016–17	Primera B Nacional	30	3	0	0	—		—		0	0	30	3
Gimnasia y Esgrima	2017–18	Primera B Nacional	6	0	0	0	—		—		0	0	6	0
Gimnasia y Esgrima	2018–19	Primera B Nacional	4	0	1	0	—		—		0	0	5	0
Gimnasia y Esgrima	Total		68	9	2	0	—		—		0	0	70	9
Monterrico (loan)	2013–14	Torneo Argentino B	10	0	0	0	—		—		0	0	10	0
Patronato	2019–20	Primera División	0	0	0	0	0	0	—		0	0	0	0
Santamarina	2020–21	Primera B Nacional	0	0	0	0	—		—		0	0	0	0
Career total			78	9	2	0	—		—		0	0	80	9
