= Giacoppo =

Giacoppo is an Italian surname. Notable people with the surname include:

- Anthony Giacoppo (born 1986), Australian cyclist
- Massimo Giacoppo (born 1983), Italian water polo player
- Silvia del Rosario Giacoppo (born 1959), Argentine politician
