= Lautaro Comas =

Argentine footballer

Personal information
- Full name: Lautaro Nicolás Comas
- Date of birth: January 15, 1995 (age 31)
- Place of birth: Paraná, Entre Ríos, Argentina
- Height: 1.72 m (5 ft 7 1/2 in)
- Position: Forward

Team information
- Current team: Sportivo Luqueño
- Number: 37

Youth career
- Patronato

Senior career*
Years	Team	Apps	(Gls)
2012–2023	Patronato	129	(9)
2017	→ O'Higgins (loan)	5	(0)
2022	→ Guaireña (loan)	26	(3)
2023	Guaireña	22	(4)
2024–	Sportivo Luqueño	30	(1)
- * Club domestic league appearances and goals as of 29 September 2024

Lautaro Nicolás Comas (born January 15, 1995) is an Argentine footballer who plays as a forward or attacking midfielder for Paraguayan club Sportivo Luqueño.

== Career ==
Comas came through the youth system of hometown club Patronato, and made his senior debut on October 6, 2013, replacing José Luis García after 55 minutes of a Primera B Nacional match at home to Villa San Carlos with his team 2–1 down. Within two minutes of entering the match, Comas crossed for Walter Andrade's equalising goal. He ended the season with 23 league appearances and 4 goals.

Comas played in 14 matches in the 2015 regular season and another 4 in the play-offs, as Patronato beat Santamarina on penalties to gain promotion to the top flight for the second time in their history – their only previous appearance was in 1978 under a very different system. He started Patronato's first match in the 2016 Primera División, at home to San Lorenzo on February 6, and supplied the assist for Patronato's second goal in a 2–2 draw. Comas appeared less than he might have hoped in the Primera, and towards the end of the 2016–17 season, speculation arose about a possible move abroad.

In July 2017, Comas extended his contract with Patronato to June 2020, and then joined Chilean Primera División club O'Higgins on loan, with an option to purchase at the end of the 2018 season. In January 2022, Comas joined Paraguayan club Guaireña on a one-year loan deal with a purchase option.

In 2024, Comas joined Sportivo Luqueño from Guaireña.

== Personal life ==
Comas was born in Paraná, in the Entre Ríos Province of Argentina. His brother, Román, is also a professional footballer.
