= Lucas Mancinelli =

Argentine footballer (born 1989)

Personal information
- Full name: Lucas Eduardo Mancinelli
- Date of birth: 6 July 1989 (age 37)
- Place of birth: La Plata, Argentina
- Height: 1.68 m (5 ft 6 in)
- Position: Midfielder

Team information
- Current team: Deportivo Cuenca
- Number: 7

Youth career
- Lanús

Senior career*
Years	Team	Apps	(Gls)
2010–2016	Lanús	4	(0)
2010–2011	→ Atlanta (loan)	32	(4)
2011–2013	→ Atlanta (loan)	37	(3)
2014	→ Ferro Carril Oeste (loan)	14	(0)
2015–2016	→ Atlanta (loan)	59	(10)
2016–2017	Temperley	28	(1)
2017–2018	Olimpo	15	(2)
2018–2019	Temperley	20	(0)
2019	Patronato	9	(0)
2020–	Deportivo Cuenca	137	(31)
- * Club domestic league appearances and goals as of 20 August 2025

Lucas Eduardo Mancinelli (born 6 July 1989) is an Argentine professional footballer who plays as a midfielder for Deportivo Cuenca.

== Career ==
Mancinelli started his career with Lanús. He joined Atlanta on loan in 2010 and made his debut during the 2010–11 Primera B Metropolitana season, he went on to score four goals in that season which ended with promotion to Primera B Nacional. In June 2011, Mancinelli returned to Argentine Primera División side Lanús. His first appearance for the club arrived on 20 August in a 0–0 draw with San Martín. On 30 September, Mancinelli departed on loan to rejoin Atlanta. He stayed for two seasons and scored three goals in thirty-nine matches. Mancinelli returned to Lanús in June 2013, featuring three times.

Mancinelli left on loan to Ferro Carril Oeste of Primera B Nacional on 30 June 2014. He was sent off in his first start for Ferro Carril Oeste, during a draw away to Instituto. On 5 January 2015, Atlanta signed Mancinelli on loan for a second time. He scored seven goals in forty-five games in 2015, before netting four in nineteen in 2016. July 2016 saw Mancinelli leave Lanús permanently to sign for fellow Primera División team Temperley. After twenty-nine matches and two goals, he left Temperley for Olimpo on 20 July 2017. In July 2018, Mancinelli rejoined Temperley; just relegated to Primera B Nacional.

On 12 June 2019, Mancinelli agreed terms with Primera División side Patronato. Nine appearances followed across the next five months. In January 2020, Mancinelli headed abroad for the first time as he signed with Ecuadorian Serie A side Deportivo Cuenca. He debuted in a home defeat to L.D.U. Quito on 14 February, with his first goals arriving on 1 September as he converted two penalties in a 2–2 draw with Técnico Universitario. He scored five further goals across October and November, which included a further brace against LDU Portoviejo.

== Career statistics ==
As of 19 December 2020.

Club statistics
Club	Season	League			Cup		League Cup		Continental		Other		Total	
Club	Season	Division	Apps	Goals	Apps	Goals	Apps	Goals	Apps	Goals	Apps	Goals	Apps	Goals
Lanús	2010–11	Primera División	0	0	0	0	—		—		0	0	0	0
Lanús	2011–12	Primera División	1	0	0	0	—		1 (Note: Appearance(s) in the Copa Sudamericana)	0	0	0	2	0
Lanús	2012–13	Primera División	0	0	0	0	—		—		0	0	0	0
Lanús	2013–14	Primera División	3	0	0	0	—		0	0	0	0	3	0
Lanús	2014	Primera División	0	0	0	0	—		0	0	0	0	0	0
Lanús	2015	Primera División	0	0	0	0	—		0	0	0	0	0	0
Lanús	2016	Primera División	0	0	0	0	—		—		0	0	0	0
Lanús	Total		4	0	0	0	—		1	0	0	0	5	0
Atlanta (loan)	2010–11	Primera B Metropolitana	32	4	0	0	—		—		0	0	32	4
Atlanta (loan)	2011–12	Primera B Nacional	20	1	0	0	—		—		0	0	20	1
Atlanta (loan)	2012–13	Primera B Metropolitana	17	2	0	0	—		—		2 (Note: Appearance(s) in the Primera B Metropolitana play-offs)	0	19	2
Atlanta (loan)	Total		69	7	0	0	—		—		2	0	71	7
Ferro Carril Oeste (loan)	2014	Primera B Nacional	14	0	1	0	—		—		0	0	15	0
Atlanta (loan)	2015	Primera B Metropolitana	40	6	4	0	—		—		1	1	45	7
Atlanta (loan)	2016	Primera B Metropolitana	19	4	0	0	—		—		0	0	19	4
Atlanta (loan)	Total		59	10	4	0	—		—		1	1	64	11
Temperley	2016–17	Primera División	28	1	1	1	—		—		0	0	29	2
Olimpo	2017–18	Primera División	15	2	3	0	—		—		0	0	18	2
Temperley	2018–19	Primera B Nacional	20	0	5	1	—		—		0	0	25	1
Patronato	2019–20	Primera División	9	0	0	0	—		—		0	0	9	0
Deportivo Cuenca	2020	Serie A	22	7	0	0	—		—		0	0	22	7
Career total			240	27	14	1	—		1	0	3	1	258	29

== Honours ==
Atlanta

- Primera B Metropolitana: 2010–11
