= Román Comas =

Argentine professional footballer

Personal information
- Full name: Matías Román Comas
- Date of birth: 19 July 1999 (age 27)
- Place of birth: Paraná, Argentina
- Position: Attacking midfielder

Team information
- Current team: Patronato
- Number: 80

Youth career
- Patronato

Senior career*
Years	Team	Apps	(Gls)
2020–	Patronato	1	(0)
- * Club domestic league appearances and goals as of 14:00, 15 December 2020 (UTC)

Matías Román Comas (born 19 July 1999) is an Argentine professional footballer who plays as an attacking midfielder for Patronato.

== Career ==
Comas is a product of the Patronato youth system. He made the breakthrough into the first-team of Gustavo Álvarez in 2020, initially appearing during pre-season. He chose the squad number 80, due to his admiration for Brazilian footballer Ronaldinho; who wore the same number during his time at Milan. Comas was an unused substitute for Copa de la Liga Profesional home matches with Huracán and Gimnasia y Esgrima in November, before appearing for his senior debut in the same competition on 14 December during a four-goal loss away to Rosario Central; replacing Mauro González after thirty-six minutes to play alongside brother Lautaro.

== Personal life ==
Comas' brother, Lautaro, is also a professional footballer; he too started at Patronato.

== Career statistics ==
As of 15 December 2020.

Appearances and goals by club, season and competition
Club	Season	League			Cup		League Cup		Continental		Other		Total	
Club	Season	Division	Apps	Goals	Apps	Goals	Apps	Goals	Apps	Goals	Apps	Goals	Apps	Goals
Patronato	2020–21 (Note: Soccerway counts Copa de la Liga Profesional appearances as league appearances.)	Primera División	1	0	0	0	0	0	—		0	0	1	0
Career total			1	0	0	0	0	0	—		0	0	1	0
