= Martín Aruga =

Argentine professional footballer

Personal information
- Full name: Jorge Martín Aruga Torales
- Date of birth: 4 October 1998 (age 28)
- Place of birth: Paraná, Argentina
- Height: 1.72 m (5 ft 8 in)
- Position: Left-back

Team information
- Current team: Patronato
- Number: 26

Youth career
- Universitario Paraná
- Belgrano Paraná
- Patronato

Senior career*
Years	Team	Apps	(Gls)
2019–	Patronato	1	(0)
2020–2021	→ San Martín SJ (loan)	8	(0)
2022	→ Gimnasia Mendoza (loan)	1	(0)
- * Club domestic league appearances and goals as of 17:54, 17 April 2022 (UTC)

Jorge Martín Aruga Torales (born 4 October 1998) is an Argentine professional footballer who plays as a left-back for Patronato.

== Career ==
Aruga had youth stints in Paraná with local clubs with Universitario and Belgrano, before progressing through the academy of Patronato. He was moved into the latter's first-team during the 2018–19 campaign, with his senior debut arriving in March 2019 as he played the full duration of a Copa Argentina penalty shoot-out victory over Primera C Metropolitana's Dock Sud. Aruga didn't appear in the Primera División in 2018–19, though would eventually make his league bow in 2019–20 on 6 October 2019 at the Estadio Monumental Antonio Vespucio Liberti against River Plate; again, playing the full ninety minutes.

== Career statistics ==
As of 7 October 2019.

Appearances and goals by club, season and competition
Club	Season	League			Cup		League Cup		Continental		Other		Total	
Club	Season	Division	Apps	Goals	Apps	Goals	Apps	Goals	Apps	Goals	Apps	Goals	Apps	Goals
Patronato	2018–19	Primera División	0	0	1	0	0	0	—		0	0	1	0
Patronato	2019–20	Primera División	1	0	0	0	0	0	—		0	0	1	0
Career total			1	0	1	0	0	0	—		0	0	2	0
