= Agustín Sandona =

Argentine footballer

Agustín Sandoná
Personal information
- Date of birth: 1 May 1993 (age 33)
- Place of birth: Paraná, Entre Ríos, Argentina
- Height: 1.84 m (6 ft 0 in)
- Position: Centre-back

Team information
- Current team: Virtus Francavilla
- Number: 5

Youth career
- Unión Santa Fe

Senior career*
Years	Team	Apps	(Gls)
2014–2017	Unión Santa Fe	22	(0)
2017–2019	Patronato	21	(1)
2019	Blooming	23	(2)
2020–2021	San Martín T.	10	(0)
2022–2023	Guillermo Brown	26	(1)
2023–2024	San Telmo	30	(0)
2024	Douglas Haig	16	(2)
2024–2025	Birkirkara	27	(2)
2025–2026	Sancataldese	12	(1)
2026–	Virtus Francavilla	2	(0)
- * Club domestic league appearances and goals as of 15 March 2026

Agustín Sandoná (born 1 May 1993) is an Argentine footballer who plays for Italian Serie D club Virtus Francavilla.
