= Faustino Dettler =

Argentine professional footballer

Personal information
- Date of birth: 11 June 1998 (age 28)
- Place of birth: Paraná, Argentina
- Height: 1.77 m (5 ft 10 in)
- Position: Forward

Team information
- Current team: Marko
- Number: 37

Youth career
- Patronato

Senior career*
Years	Team	Apps	(Gls)
2019–2021	Patronato	13	(1)
2022–2023	OF Ierapetra	37	(1)
2023–2024	Ilioupoli	21	(2)
2024–2025	Asteras Tripolis B	15	(0)
2025–	Marko	17	(0)
- * Club domestic league appearances and goals as of 15 February 2026

Faustino Dettler (born 11 June 1998) is an Argentine professional footballer who plays as a forward for Greek Super League 2 club GS Marko.

== Career ==
Dettler started off in the youth set-up of Patronato. He was moved into the club's senior squad in March 2019, initially appearing as an unused substitute for a Copa Argentina win over Dock Sud on 13 March. He made his professional bow on 30 March in the Primera División against Godoy Cruz, coming off the bench on sixty-two minutes before scoring one minute later with his first touch; though Patronato went on to lose 2–1.

In January 2022, Dettler moved to Super League Greece 2 club OF Ierapetra.

== Career statistics ==
As of 31 March 2019.

Appearances and goals by club, season and competition
Club	Season	League			Cup		Continental		Other		Total	
Club	Season	Division	Apps	Goals	Apps	Goals	Apps	Goals	Apps	Goals	Apps	Goals
Patronato	2018–19	Primera División	1	1	0	0	—		0	0	1	1
Career total			1	1	0	0	—		0	0	1	1
