= Federico Costa =

Argentine professional footballer

Personal information
- Full name: Federico Costa
- Date of birth: 8 October 1988 (age 38)
- Place of birth: Río Cuarto, Argentina
- Height: 1.88 m (6 ft 2 in)
- Position: Goalkeeper

Senior career*
Years	Team	Apps	(Gls)
- Recreativo Estrellas
- Estudiantes RC
2010–2015	Talleres	19	(0)
2016–2021	Patronato	10	(0)
2021	Ferro Carril Oeste	3	(0)
- * Club domestic league appearances and goals as of 20:27, 17 April 2022 (UTC)

Federico Costa (born 8 October 1988) is an Argentine professional footballer who plays as a goalkeeper.

== Career ==
Costa started his career with local clubs Recreativo Estrellas and Estudiantes. In 2010, Costa joined Talleres of Torneo Argentino A. He didn't appear in a Talleres first-team squad until he was an unused substitute for two Copa Argentina matches in late-2012. It was in the Copa Argentina that Costa made his debut for the club, he played the full ninety minutes of a 3–0 victory over Sarmiento on 16 April 2014. He made his professional league debut a month later during a defeat to Independiente Rivadavia in Primera B Nacional. Three further appearances followed in 2013–14 which ended with relegation to Torneo Federal A.

He subsequently made twenty-two appearances in two seasons in Torneo Federal A, prior to departing Talleres at the conclusion of 2015 to join Argentine Primera División side Patronato. He made his top-flight debut on 9 September 2016 versus Gimnasia y Esgrima. In 2021, Costa played for Ferro Carril Oeste.

== Career statistics ==
As of 10 May 2018.

Club statistics
Club	Season	League			Cup (Note: Includes the Copa Argentina)		League Cup		Continental		Other		Total	
Club	Season	Division	Apps	Goals	Apps	Goals	Apps	Goals	Apps	Goals	Apps	Goals	Apps	Goals
Patronato	2016	Primera División	0	0	0	0	—		—		0	0	0	0
Patronato	2016–17	Primera División	4	0	0	0	—		—		0	0	4	0
Patronato	2017–18	Primera División	1	0	0	0	—		—		0	0	1	0
Career total			5	0	0	0	—		—		0	0	5	0

== Honours ==
Talleres

- Torneo Federal A: 2015
