= Nicolás Pantaleone =

Argentine footballer

Personal information
- Date of birth: 18 February 1993 (age 33)
- Place of birth: Buenos Aires, Argentina
- Height: 1.80 m (5 ft 11 in)
- Position: Left-back

Team information
- Current team: Chacarita Juniors

Youth career
- River Plate

Senior career*
Years	Team	Apps	(Gls)
2013–2014	River Plate	0	(0)
2014–2016	Tigre	3	(0)
2016–2018	Olimpo	32	(1)
2018–2019	Patronato	14	(0)
2019–2020	Danubio	22	(2)
2021	Tristán Suárez	15	(3)
2022	Atlanta	3	(0)
2022–2024	Tristán Suárez	40	(2)
2024–2025	Portuguesa	23	(1)
2025–2026	Tristán Suárez	30	(0)
2026–	Chacarita Juniors	4	(0)
- * Club domestic league appearances and goals as of 17:47, 1 April 2026 (UTC)

Nicolás Pantaleone (born 18 February 1993) is an Argentine professional footballer who plays as a left-back for Chacarita Juniors.

== Career ==
Pantaleone began with River Plate. He featured once for the U20s at the 2012 U-20 Copa Libertadores, which River Plate won, against Corinthians. For the first-team, he was an unused substitute for a Copa Argentina defeat to Estudiantes of Primera B Metropolitana in April 2013. On 2 August 2014, Pantaleone departed River Plate to join Tigre. He made his professional debut in an Argentine Primera División match with Belgrano on 23 November. After three seasons and just three appearances in total for the club, Pantaleone left and subsequently joined Olimpo in 2016. He scored his first goal on 27 May 2017 versus Newell's Old Boys.

He left Olimpo on 16 May 2018. In the succeeding June, Pantaleone signed for Patronato. A total of fifteen appearances followed in 2018–19 for them, prior to Pantaleone leaving to go abroad for the first time after agreeing terms with Uruguayan Primera División side Danubio. His bow arrived on 1 August, as he appeared for the full duration of a home loss to Montevideo-based River Plate.

== Career statistics ==
As of 3 September 2019.

Club statistics
Club	Season	League			Cup		League Cup		Continental		Other		Total	
Club	Season	Division	Apps	Goals	Apps	Goals	Apps	Goals	Apps	Goals	Apps	Goals	Apps	Goals
River Plate	2013–14	Argentine Primera División	0	0	0	0	—		0	0	0	0	0	0
Tigre	2014	Argentine Primera División	1	0	0	0	—		—		0	0	1	0
Tigre	2015	Argentine Primera División	2	0	0	0	—		0	0	0	0	2	0
Tigre	2016	Argentine Primera División	0	0	0	0	—		—		0	0	0	0
Tigre	Total		3	0	0	0	—		0	0	0	0	3	0
Olimpo	2016–17	Argentine Primera División	15	1	1	0	—		—		0	0	16	1
Olimpo	2017–18	Argentine Primera División	17	0	1	0	—		—		0	0	18	0
Olimpo	Total		32	1	2	0	—		—		0	0	34	1
Patronato	2018–19	Argentine Primera División	14	0	1	0	0	0	—		0	0	15	0
Danubio	2019	Uruguayan Primera División	1	0	—		—		0	0	0	0	1	0
Career total			50	1	3	0	0	0	0	0	0	0	53	1

== Honours ==
River Plate

- U-20 Copa Libertadores: 2012
