= Monterrico =

Coordinates: 24°27′05″S 65°10′00″W

- Municipality and town
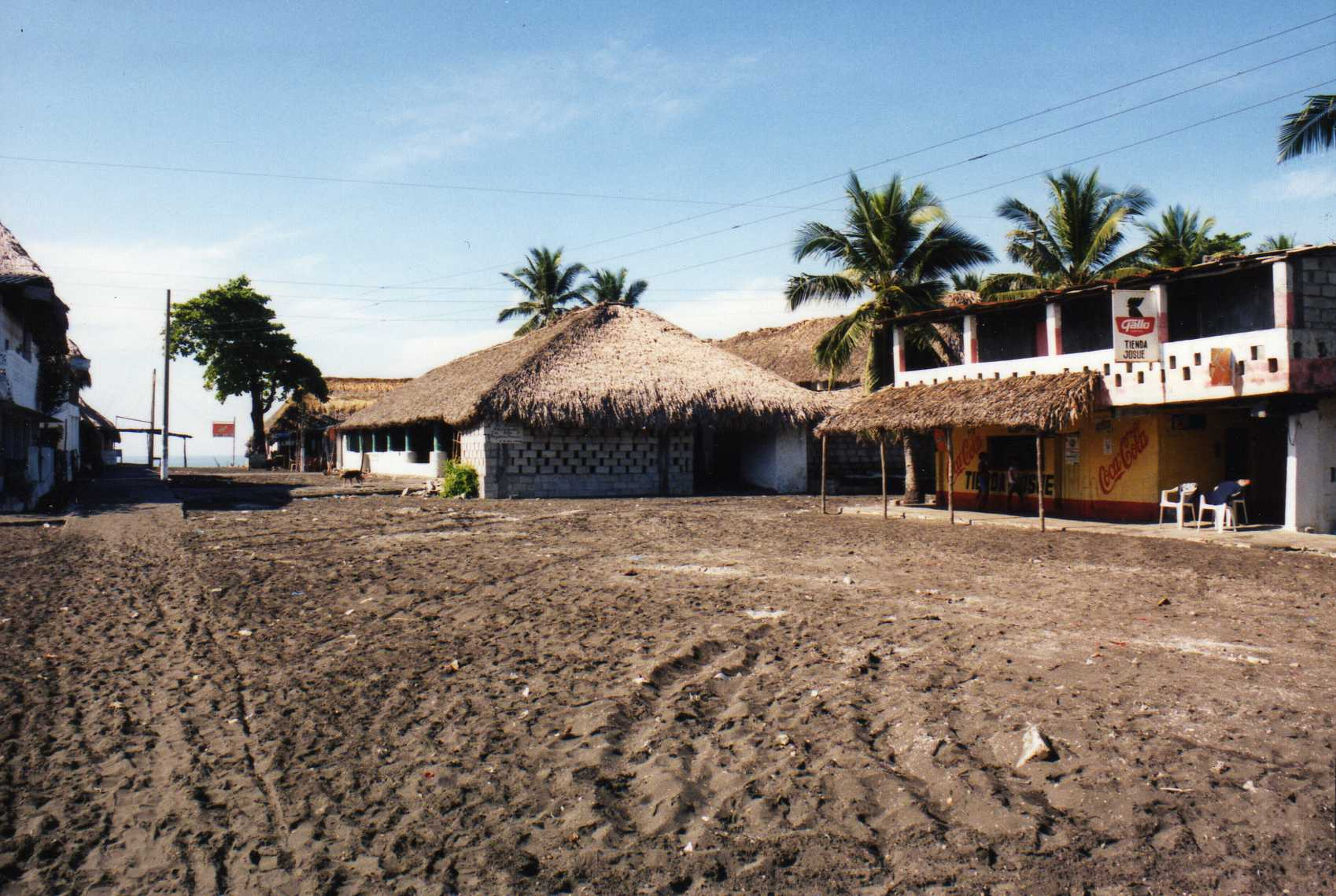
- Interactive map of Monterrico
- Country: Argentina
- Province: Jujuy
- Department: El Carmen

Government
  - Intendant: Juan Carlos Ibarra
- Elevation: 3,068 ft (935 m)

Population (2001)
  - Total: 9,167
- Time zone: UTC−3 (ART)

Monterrico is a town and municipality in Jujuy Province in Argentina.
