= Gabriel Díaz (footballer) =

Argentine footballer

Personal information
- Full name: Gabriel Adrián Díaz
- Date of birth: 17 October 1989 (age 37)
- Place of birth: Buenos Aires, Argentina
- Height: 1.86 m (6 ft 1 in)
- Position: Centre-back

Team information
- Current team: Gimnasia y Tiro

Senior career*
| Years | Team | Apps | (Gls) |
| 2008–2011 | Comunicaciones | 65 | (2) |
| 2011–2012 | Gimnasia Jujuy | 13 | (0) |
| 2012–2013 | Defensores de Belgrano | 30 | (2) |
| 2013–2014 | Tristán Suárez | 29 | (0) |
| 2014–2015 | Palestino | 5 | (0) |
| 2015 | San Luis | 9 | (0) |
| 2015–2016 | Everton | 29 | (4) |
| 2016–2017 | Flandria | 23 | (0) |
| 2017 | San Luis | 12 | (1) |
| 2018–2019 | Ferro Carril Oeste | 33 | (9) |
| 2019–2020 | Patronato | 7 | (2) |
| 2020–2023 | Ferro Carril Oeste | 61 | (2) |
| 2023–2024 | Quilmes | 33 | (1) |
| 2024–2025 | Ferro Carril Oeste | 21 | (2) |
| 2025– | Gimnasia y Tiro | 32 | (1) |
- * Club domestic league appearances and goals as of 18:00, 28 April 2026 (UTC)

Gabriel Adrián Díaz (born 17 October 1989) is an Argentinian football player, who plays for Gimnasia y Tiro.
