= Marcos Minetti =

Argentine footballer

Personal information
- Full name: Marcos Javier Minetti
- Date of birth: 17 April 1989 (age 37)
- Place of birth: Paraná, Argentina
- Height: 1.85 m (6 ft 1 in)
- Position: Midfielder

Team information
- Current team: Atlético Paraná

Senior career*
Years	Team	Apps	(Gls)
2011–2019	Patronato	48	(2)
2019	Gimnasia y Esgrima	10	(0)
2020–	Atlético Paraná	3	(0)
- * Club domestic league appearances and goals as of 13:05, 8 October 2020 (UTC)

Marcos Javier Minetti (born 17 April 1989) is an Argentine professional footballer who plays as a midfielder for Atlético Paraná.

== Career ==
Minetti was promoted into Patronato's first-team in 2011, making his professional debut in a Copa Argentina match with Newell's Old Boys on 29 November. In Primera B Nacional, he was an unused substitute five times during 2011–12, prior to making his league debut on 24 February 2012 versus Gimnasia y Esgrima (LP). He was subbed on with eighteen minutes remaining for Marcelo Guzmán, but left the match in stoppage time after receiving a red card. In April 2014, Minetti scored his first career goal during a Copa Argentina loss to Instituto. In 2015, Minetti scored three goals in twenty-five matches as they won promotion.

In the Primera División, he was sent off twice in his first nine appearances. Minetti left Patronato midway through 2019, having not appeared competitively since March 2017 due to a series of injuries. July 2019 saw Minetti join Gimnasia y Esgrima of Torneo Federal A. Ten appearances followed. In January 2020, Minetti agreed a move to Torneo Regional Federal Amateur with Atlético Paraná.

== Career statistics ==
As of 8 October 2020.

Club statistics
Club	Season	League			Cup		League Cup		Continental		Other		Total	
Club	Season	Division	Apps	Goals	Apps	Goals	Apps	Goals	Apps	Goals	Apps	Goals	Apps	Goals
Patronato	2011–12	Primera B Nacional	8	0	1	0	—		—		0	0	9	0
Patronato	2012–13	Primera B Nacional	1	0	1	0	—		—		0	0	2	0
Patronato	2013–14	Primera B Nacional	5	0	1	1	—		—		0	0	6	1
Patronato	2014	Primera B Nacional	0	0	0	0	—		—		0	0	0	0
Patronato	2015	Primera B Nacional	20	2	1	0	—		—		4 (Note: Appearance(s) in the Primera B Nacional play-offs)	1	25	3
Patronato	2016	Primera División	7	0	0	0	—		—		0	0	7	0
Patronato	2016–17	Primera División	7	0	1	0	—		—		0	0	8	0
Patronato	2017–18	Primera División	0	0	0	0	—		—		0	0	0	0
Patronato	2018–19	Primera División	0	0	0	0	—		—		0	0	0	0
Patronato	Total		48	2	5	1	—		—		4	1	57	4
Gimnasia y Esgrima	2019–20	Torneo Federal A	10	0	0	0	—		—		0	0	10	0
Atlético Paraná	2020	Torneo Amateur	3	0	0	0	—		—		0	0	3	0
Career total			61	2	5	1	—		—		4	1	70	4
