= Damián Lemos =

Argentine footballer (born 1989)

Personal information
- Full name: Damián Oscar Lemos
- Date of birth: 31 January 1989 (age 37)
- Place of birth: González Catán, Argentina
- Height: 1.78 m (5 ft 10 in)
- Position: Midfielder

Team information
- Current team: Agropecuario

Youth career
- 1994–2004: Deportivo de González Catán
- 2004–2007: Nueva Chicago

Senior career*
Years	Team	Apps	(Gls)
2007–2016	Nueva Chicago	174	(1)
2010–2011	→ Deportivo Merlo (loan)	31	(0)
2013–2014	→ Ferro Carril Oeste (loan)	31	(0)
2016–2022	Patronato	107	(0)
2022–2023	San Martín SJ	27	(0)
2023–2024	Agropecuario	35	(1)
2024	Universidad de Concepción	15	(0)
2024–	Agropecuario	42	(0)
- * Club domestic league appearances and goals as of 17:37, 21 April 2026 (UTC)

Damián Oscar Lemos (born 31 January 1989) is an Argentine professional footballer who plays as a midfielder for Agropecuario.

== Career ==
Lemos started in the youth system of Deportivo de González Catán in 1994, leaving in 2004 to join Nueva Chicago. His senior career started in 2007 with Nueva Chicago. He remained with the club for nine years, making one hundred and eighty appearances and scoring once in all competitions across various seasons in Primera B Nacional, Primera B Metropolitana and the Argentine Primera División; he made his top-flight debut for Nueva Chicago in February 2015 against Belgrano. Ahead of 2010–11, Lemos was loaned to Primera B Nacional team Deportivo Merlo. Thirty-one appearances followed.

Three seasons later, after nineteen more appearances for Nueva Chicago, Lemos left on loan again to join Ferro Carril Oeste in July 2013. His first appearance for Ferro Carril Oeste came during a 2–2 draw with Boca Unidos on 3 August. In his eighteenth appearance, Lemos was sent off in a goalless tie versus Huracán. In total, he featured thirty-two times in all competitions for Ferro Carril Oeste. He remained with Nueva Chicago for two more seasons, prior to departing in January 2016 to play for Primera División side Patronato. On 6 February, Lemos made his debut versus San Lorenzo.

Ahead of the 2022 season, Lemos joined Primera Nacional side San Martín de San Juan.

In 2024, he moved to Chile and joined Universidad de Concepción.

== Career statistics ==
As of 8 May 2018.

Club statistics
Club	Season	League			Cup (Note: Includes the Copa Argentina)		League Cup		Continental		Other		Total	
Club	Season	Division	Apps	Goals	Apps	Goals	Apps	Goals	Apps	Goals	Apps	Goals	Apps	Goals
Patronato	2016	Argentine Primera División	12	0	0	0	—		—		0	0	12	0
Patronato	2016–17	Argentine Primera División	24	0	3	0	—		—		0	0	27	0
Patronato	2017–18	Argentine Primera División	19	0	0	0	—		—		0	0	19	0
Career total			55	0	3	0	—		—		0	0	58	0
