= Paraná, Entre Ríos =

Paraná
- City
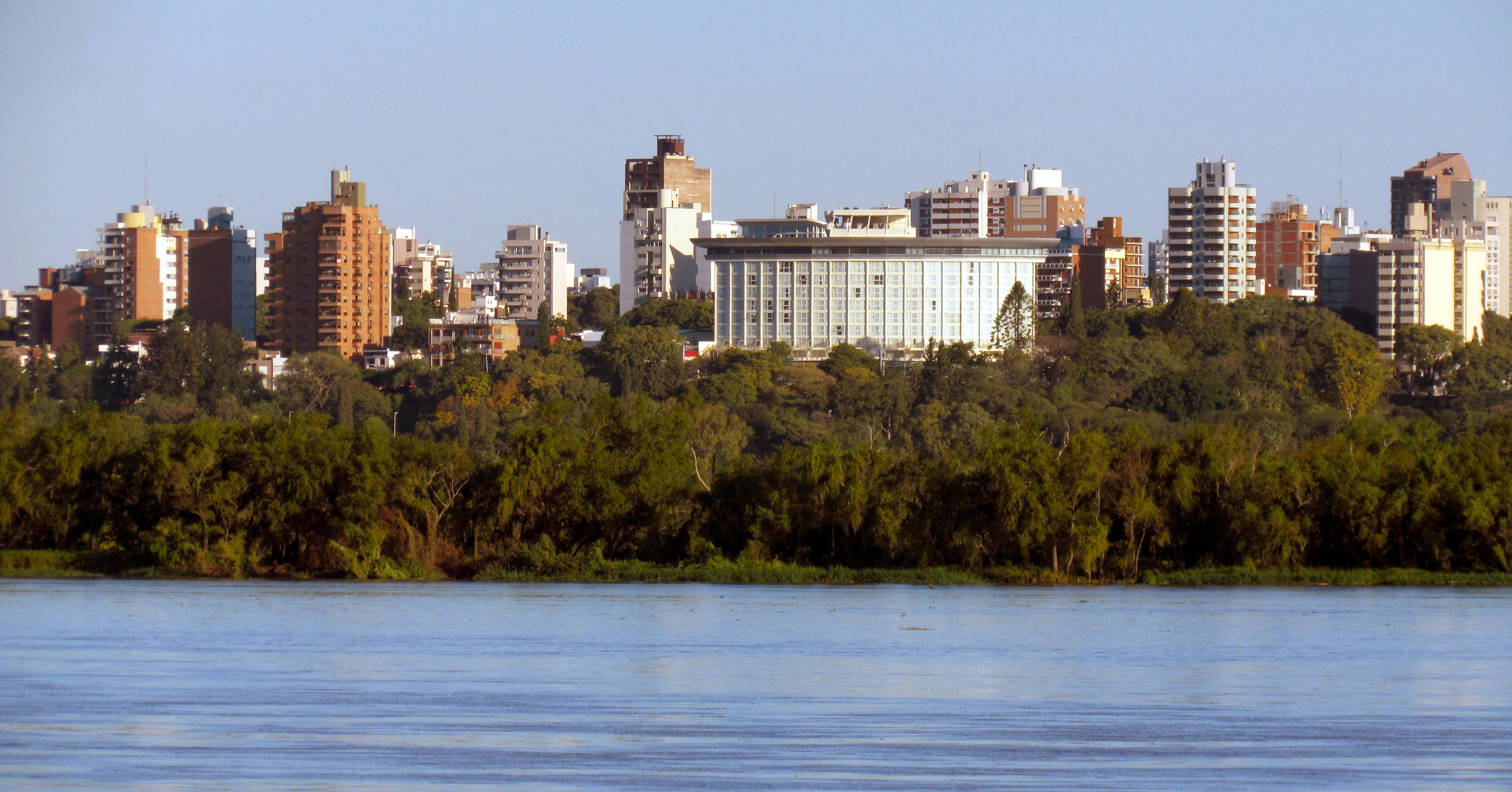
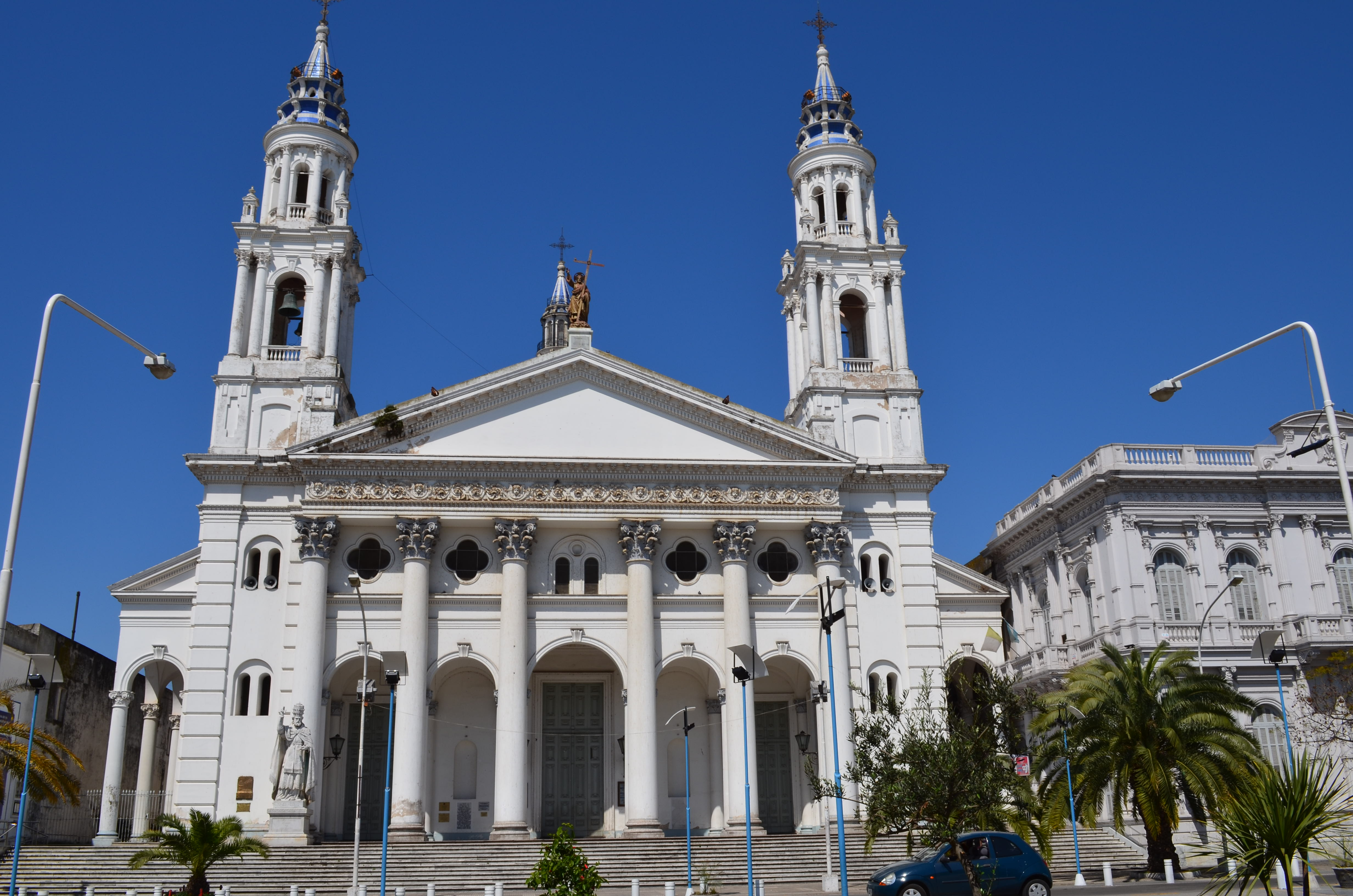
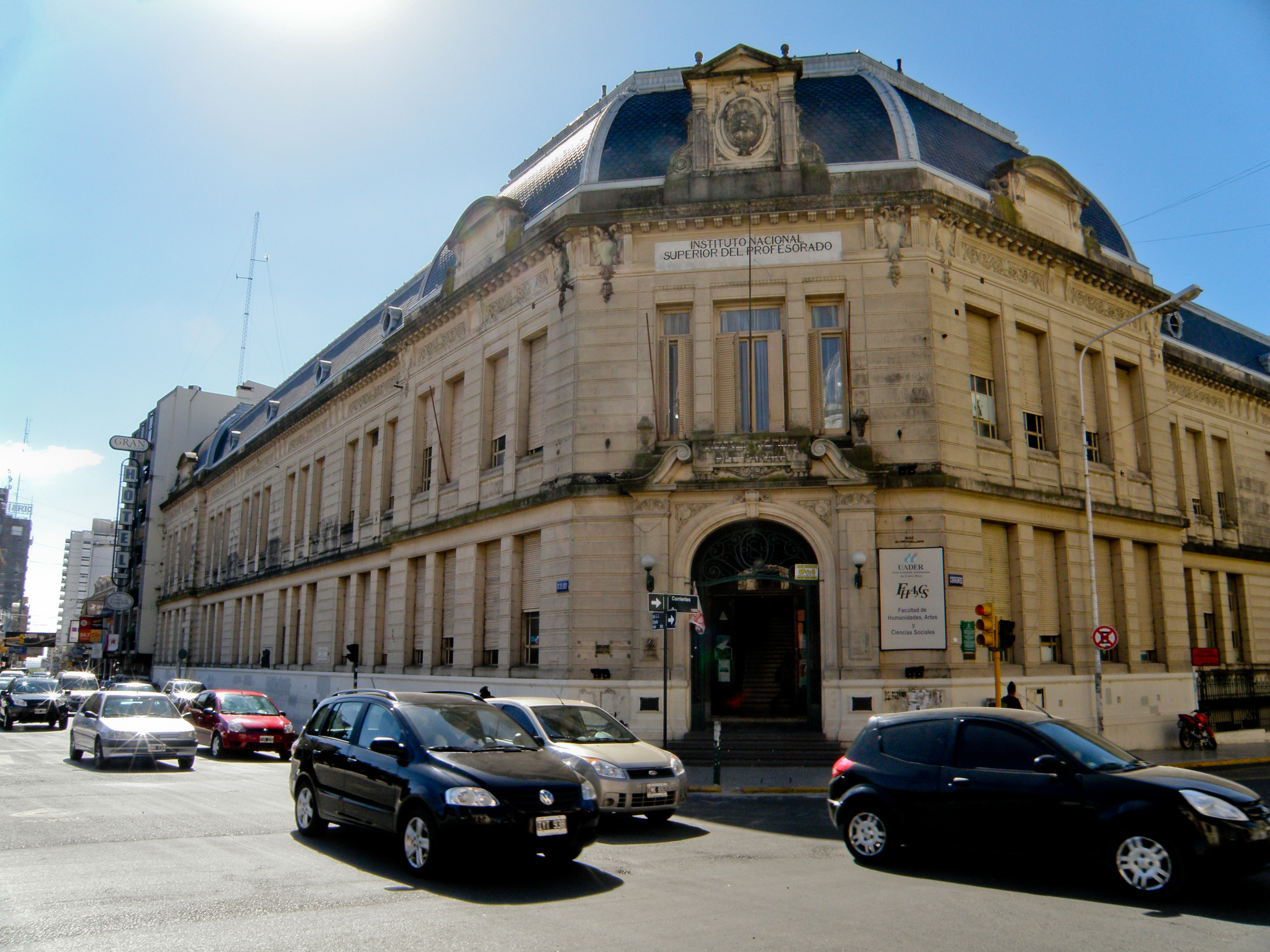
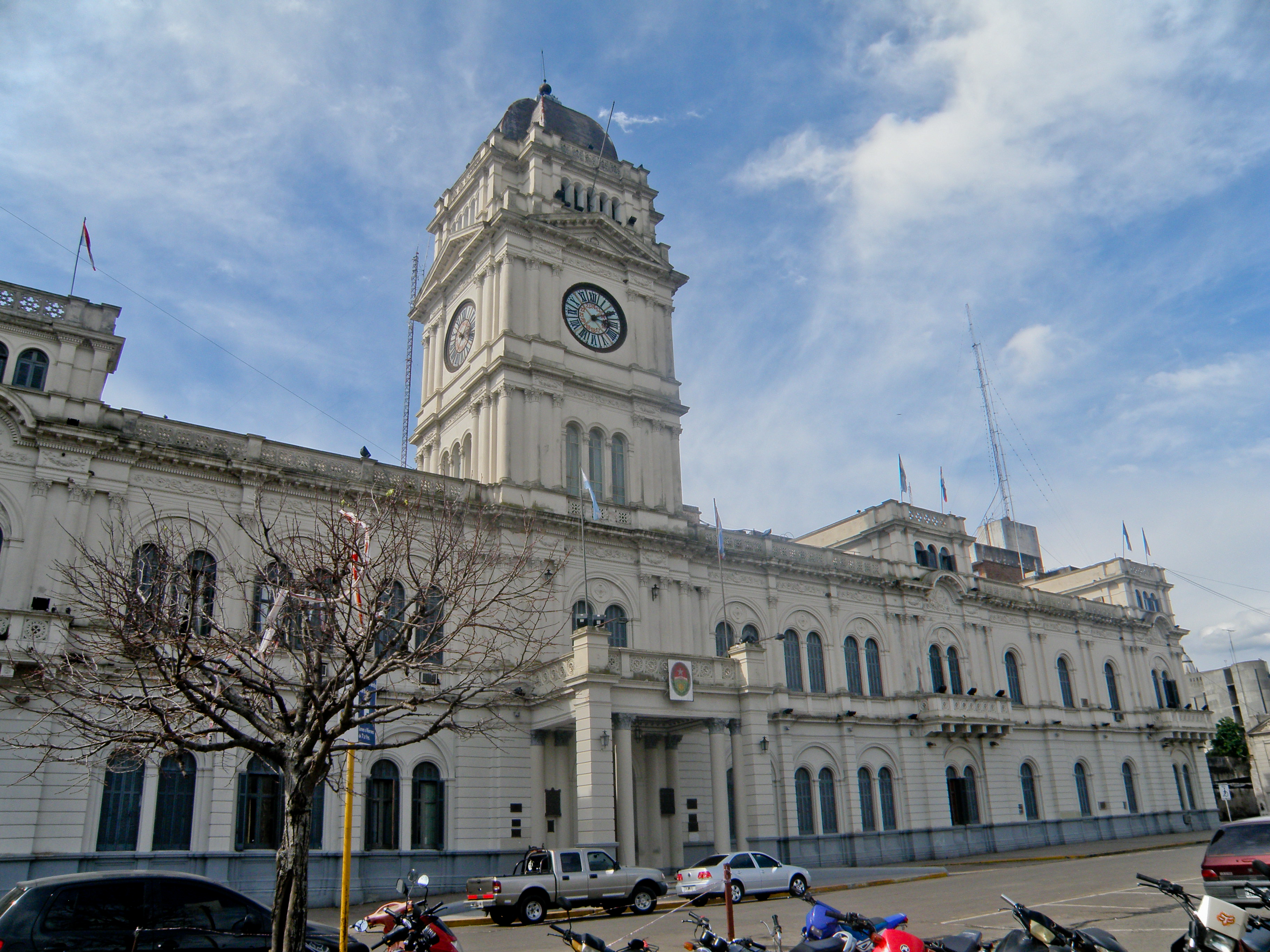
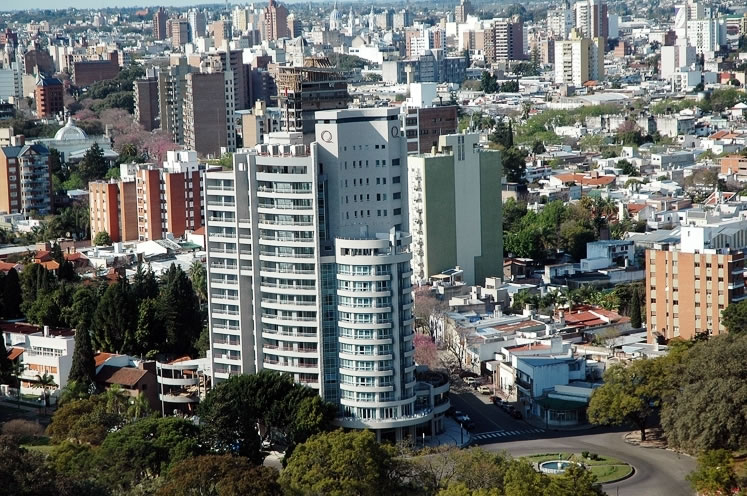
- Skyline of Paraná Paraná Cathedral Higher national institute Entre Ríos Government House Downtown area

- Flag Coat of arms

- Location within Entre Ríos Province Location within Argentina Location within South America
- Coordinates: 31°43′59″S 60°31′47″W
- Country: Argentina
- Province: Entre Ríos
- Department: Paraná
- Founded: 23 October 1730

Government
  - Intendant: Rosario Romero (Justicialist Party)

Area
  - City: 137 km^{2} (53 sq mi)
- Elevation: 77 m (253 ft)

Population (2022 census)
  - Urban: 268,889
  - Urban density: 5,000/km^{2} (13,000/sq mi)
  - Metro: 312,713
- Demonym(s): Paranarian, Paranaense(Spanish)
- Time zone: UTC−3 (ART)
- CPA base: E3100
- Dialing code: +54 343
- Website: Official website

Paraná (Spanish pronunciation: [paɾaˈna]) is the capital city of the Argentine province Entre Ríos, located on the eastern shore of the Paraná River, opposite the city of Santa Fe, capital of the neighbouring Santa Fe Province. The city has a population of 268,889 inhabitants within its urban area. Greater Paraná has a population of 312,713 inhabitants. (2022 census [INDEC]) Its original name was Bajada (landing).

== History ==
In 1730, inhabitants of the city of Santa Fe settled at the other shore of the Paraná river. The first settlers called it “Baxada del Paraná”. The original settlers came to Paraná after being forced out of Santa Fe by marauding Payaguá and Muños Indians. The settlers established themselves in the modern plaza primerdo de mayo "The Square of the first of May, where they built a fort, other defenses, and a series of huts. Eventually the numbers of the settlers were stable enough to where they could move on from defense to offense and almost wiped out both the Payaguá and Muños.

Between 1854 and 1861, it was the capital city of the Argentine Confederation.

== Economy ==
Paraná is not only the head of the provincial government, but also an important river port for the transshipment of cereals, cattle, fish, and lumber from the surrounding region. The principal industries installed are the manufacture of cement, furniture, and ceramics.

== Cityscape ==
The city center brings together colonial churches, European styles seen in structures like the 3 de Febrero Theatre or the Government House, the blended architectural styles of the city's Cathedral, and modern towers, such as those found near Parque Urquiza park. The city is connected to the city of Santa Fe on the other side of the Entre Ríos by the Hernandarias Subfluvial Tunnel inaugurated in 1969.

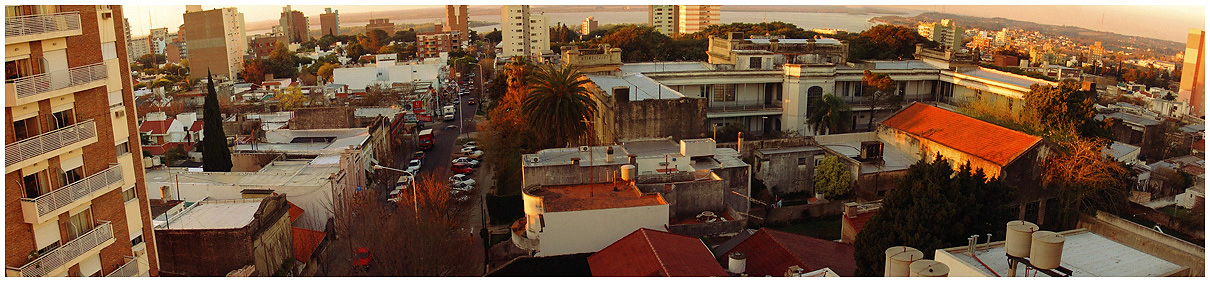
Panoramic view of the city of Paraná

== Transport ==
Paraná is served by General Justo José de Urquiza Airport (IATA PRA), at coordinates 31°47′07″S 60°28′09″W, 7.5 km (4.7 miles) from the city, with regular flights to Buenos Aires (Aeroparque Jorge Newbery). Another option is Sauce Viejo Airport in nearby Santa Fe.

Paraná is also connected to regional and national road networks via National Routes 12, 18, and 168, as well as Provincial Route 11. The city is directly linked to Santa Fe across the Paraná River by the Raúl Uranga–Carlos Sylvestre Begnis Subfluvial Tunnel.

== Climate ==
Paraná has a Pampean climate, which under the Köppen climate classification, would be classified as a humid subtropical climate (Cfa). The average annual temperature is 18 °C (64.4 °F). Winters are characterized with mild temperatures during the day and very cold nights. The average high is 18 °C (64.4 °F) while the average low is 5 °C (41.0 °F). Temperatures occasionally fall below 1 °C (33.8 °F), leading to frosts.

Spring and Fall are transitional seasons with warm temperatures during the day with cool temperatures during the night. Normally, the last frost occurs on August 4, although frosts can occur as late as October 9. The first frost occurs on June 22 though frosts as early as May has occurred.

Summers are characterized by hot weather during the day with mild to warm nights. The average temperature during summer is around 23 °C (73.4 °F); however, heat waves can push temperatures above 37 °C (98.6 °F) and cool Pampero winds can push temperatures below 10 °C (50.0 °F). Most of the precipitation occurs during the summer, receiving an average precipitation of 400 mm (16 in). The city, along with the entire province, is located in an area of high risk of tornadoes in the country, particularly during spring and summer.

Paraná receives 1,069.1 mm (42.09 in) of precipitation per year, most of it concentrated in the summer months and there are 87 days with measurable precipitation. The average relative humidity is 73%. Wind speeds are moderate throughout the year, ranging from a low of 10.1 km/h (6.3 mph) in April to a high of 16.0 km/h (9.9 mph) in September. Paraná receives an average of 2713.3 hours (or 61% of possible sunshine) of bright sunshine per year, ranging from a low of 51% in June to a high of 67% in January and February. The highest temperature ever recorded was 42.8 °C (109.0 °F) on January 2, 1963, while the lowest temperature ever recorded was −7.0 °C (19.4 °F) on July 10, 1976.

Climate data for Paraná, Entre Ríos (General Justo José de Urquiza Airport) 1991–2020, extremes 1961–present
Month	Jan	Feb	Mar	Apr	May	Jun	Jul	Aug	Sep	Oct	Nov	Dec	Year
Record high °C (°F)	42.8 (109.0)	39.7 (103.5)	38.4 (101.1)	34.7 (94.5)	32.8 (91.0)	30.0 (86.0)	31.6 (88.9)	36.0 (96.8)	39.0 (102.2)	38.5 (101.3)	39.7 (103.5)	42.0 (107.6)	42.8 (109.0)
Mean daily maximum °C (°F)	31.2 (88.2)	29.7 (85.5)	27.9 (82.2)	24.0 (75.2)	20.3 (68.5)	17.3 (63.1)	16.9 (62.4)	19.6 (67.3)	21.8 (71.2)	24.6 (76.3)	27.6 (81.7)	29.8 (85.6)	24.2 (75.6)
Daily mean °C (°F)	25.0 (77.0)	23.6 (74.5)	21.8 (71.2)	18.3 (64.9)	15.0 (59.0)	12.2 (54.0)	11.4 (52.5)	13.3 (55.9)	15.5 (59.9)	18.6 (65.5)	21.5 (70.7)	23.8 (74.8)	18.3 (64.9)
Mean daily minimum °C (°F)	19.4 (66.9)	18.6 (65.5)	16.9 (62.4)	13.8 (56.8)	11.0 (51.8)	8.3 (46.9)	7.2 (45.0)	8.4 (47.1)	10.2 (50.4)	13.3 (55.9)	15.7 (60.3)	18.0 (64.4)	13.4 (56.1)
Record low °C (°F)	7.5 (45.5)	6.9 (44.4)	3.5 (38.3)	0.5 (32.9)	−2.4 (27.7)	−6.2 (20.8)	−7.0 (19.4)	−5.3 (22.5)	−3.9 (25.0)	0.0 (32.0)	2.3 (36.1)	4.0 (39.2)	−7.0 (19.4)
Average precipitation mm (inches)	112.2 (4.42)	128.3 (5.05)	147.6 (5.81)	136.6 (5.38)	63.5 (2.50)	36.7 (1.44)	30.8 (1.21)	38.4 (1.51)	54.0 (2.13)	131.1 (5.16)	123.6 (4.87)	152.0 (5.98)	1,154.8 (45.46)
Average precipitation days (≥ 0.1 mm)	7.6	7.9	7.3	8.4	5.8	4.4	4.1	4.2	5.6	9.3	8.0	8.9	81.6
Average relative humidity (%)	66.3	71.5	73.9	77.1	79.5	79.6	75.4	70.2	67.7	69.5	65.3	64.9	71.7
Mean monthly sunshine hours	285.2	243.0	238.7	198.0	176.7	147.0	176.7	207.7	210.0	232.5	264.0	254.2	2,633.7
Mean daily sunshine hours	9.2	8.6	7.7	6.6	5.7	4.9	5.7	6.7	7.0	7.5	8.8	8.2	7.2
Percentage possible sunshine	67	67	62	63	58	51	53	59	58	62	66	62	61
Source 1: Servicio Meteorológico Nacional
Source 2: NOAA (percent sun 1961–1990)

Climate data for Paraná INTA (1934–2014)
Month	Jan	Feb	Mar	Apr	May	Jun	Jul	Aug	Sep	Oct	Nov	Dec	Year
Record high °C (°F)	42.0 (107.6)	40.8 (105.4)	39.5 (103.1)	35.2 (95.4)	35.8 (96.4)	29.9 (85.8)	31.4 (88.5)	36.4 (97.5)	40.0 (104.0)	39.2 (102.6)	41.5 (106.7)	41.5 (106.7)	42.0 (107.6)
Mean daily maximum °C (°F)	30.9 (87.6)	29.6 (85.3)	27.3 (81.1)	23.4 (74.1)	20.4 (68.7)	17.1 (62.8)	16.9 (62.4)	18.9 (66.0)	21.0 (69.8)	23.9 (75.0)	27.0 (80.6)	29.5 (85.1)	23.8 (74.8)
Daily mean °C (°F)	24.9 (76.8)	23.8 (74.8)	21.8 (71.2)	18.2 (64.8)	15.4 (59.7)	12.5 (54.5)	12.0 (53.6)	13.4 (56.1)	15.3 (59.5)	18.2 (64.8)	20.9 (69.6)	23.5 (74.3)	18.3 (64.9)
Mean daily minimum °C (°F)	18.8 (65.8)	18.1 (64.6)	16.5 (61.7)	12.8 (55.0)	10.6 (51.1)	8.0 (46.4)	7.0 (44.6)	7.9 (46.2)	9.6 (49.3)	12.5 (54.5)	14.9 (58.8)	17.4 (63.3)	12.8 (55.0)
Record low °C (°F)	5.6 (42.1)	5.0 (41.0)	4.0 (39.2)	1.1 (34.0)	−1.6 (29.1)	−3.4 (25.9)	−5.5 (22.1)	−3.0 (26.6)	−1.9 (28.6)	2.2 (36.0)	3.6 (38.5)	6.5 (43.7)	−5.5 (22.1)
Average precipitation mm (inches)	116 (4.6)	110 (4.3)	156 (6.1)	105 (4.1)	52 (2.0)	39 (1.5)	29 (1.1)	32 (1.3)	54 (2.1)	106 (4.2)	111 (4.4)	117 (4.6)	1,027 (40.4)
Average relative humidity (%)	67	71	73	75	77	78	75	71	68	69	67	65	71
Mean monthly sunshine hours	285.2	237.3	238.7	198.0	179.8	147.0	173.6	195.3	210.0	235.6	261.0	279.0	2,640.5
Mean daily sunshine hours	9.2	8.4	7.7	6.5	5.8	4.9	5.6	6.3	7.0	7.6	8.7	9.0	7.2
Source: Instituto Nacional de Tecnología Agropecuaria

== Sports ==
The city is home to the basketball team Atlético Echagüe. As of 2017, it competes in the Liga Nacional de Básquet, Argentina's top professional basketball division. It plays its home games at the Estadio Luis Butta. The main football teams are: Club Atlético Patronato and Club Atlético Paraná.

Paraná was the host to the inaugural U-23 Men's Softball World Cup in 2023.

== Gallery ==
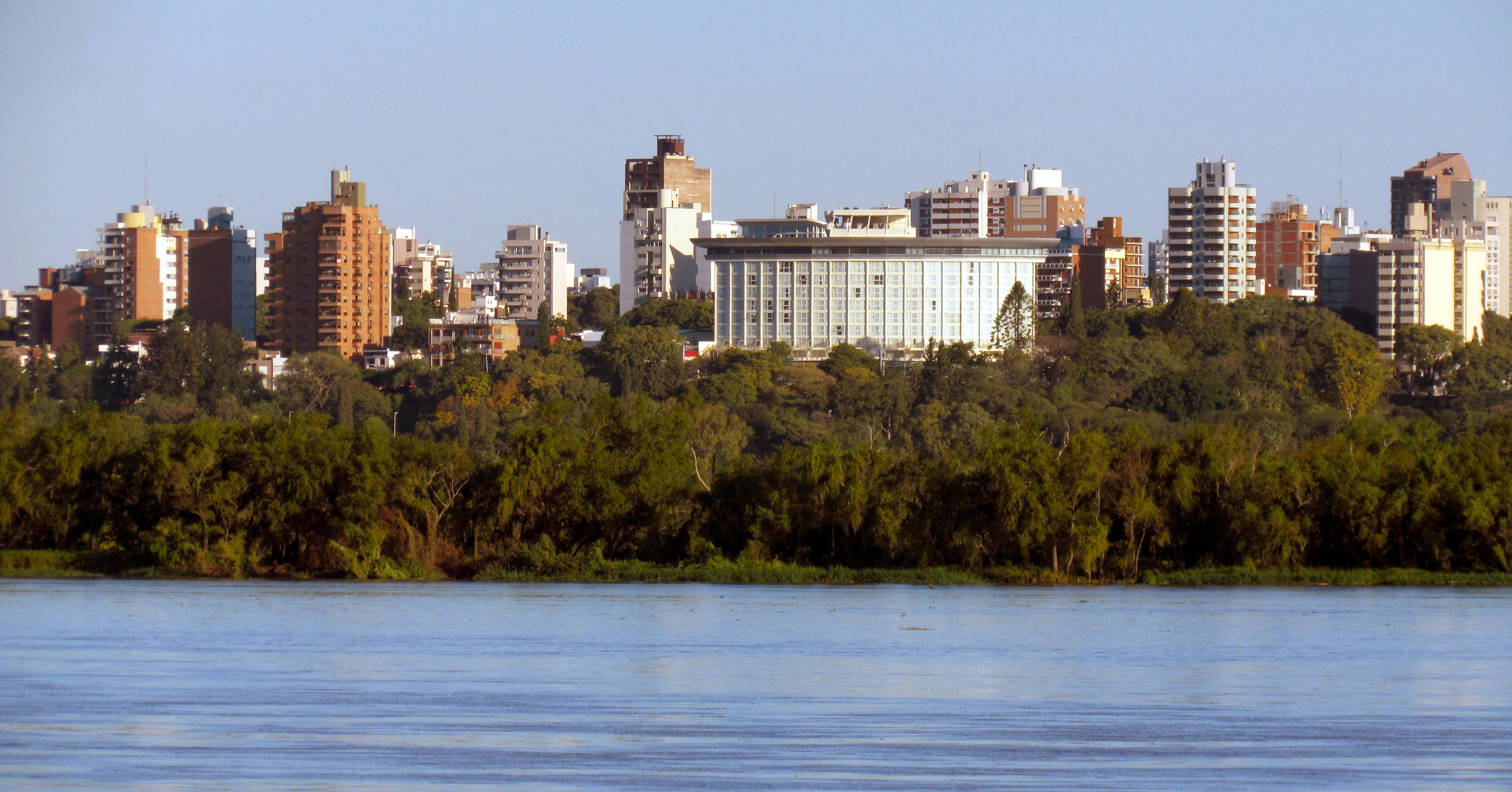

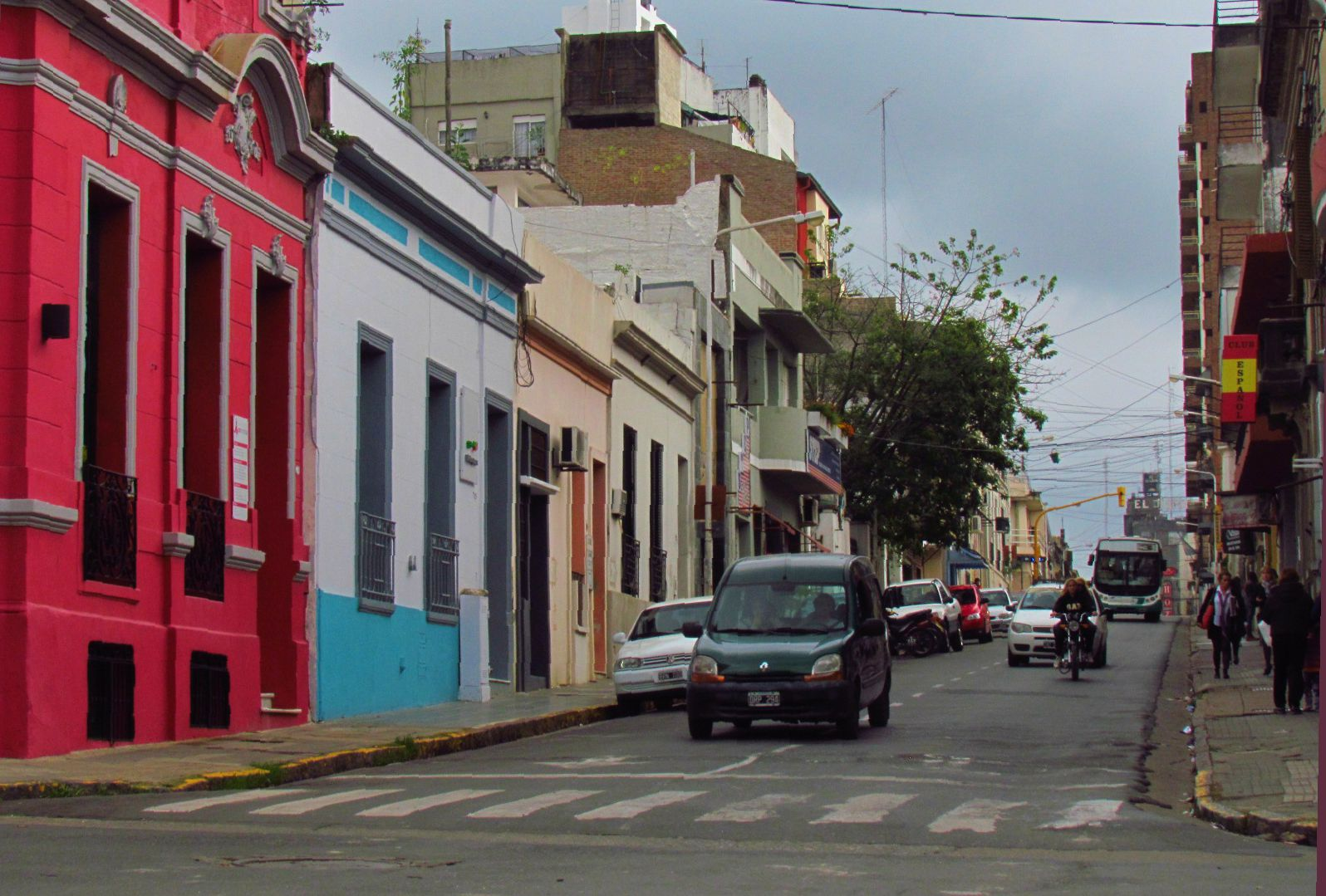

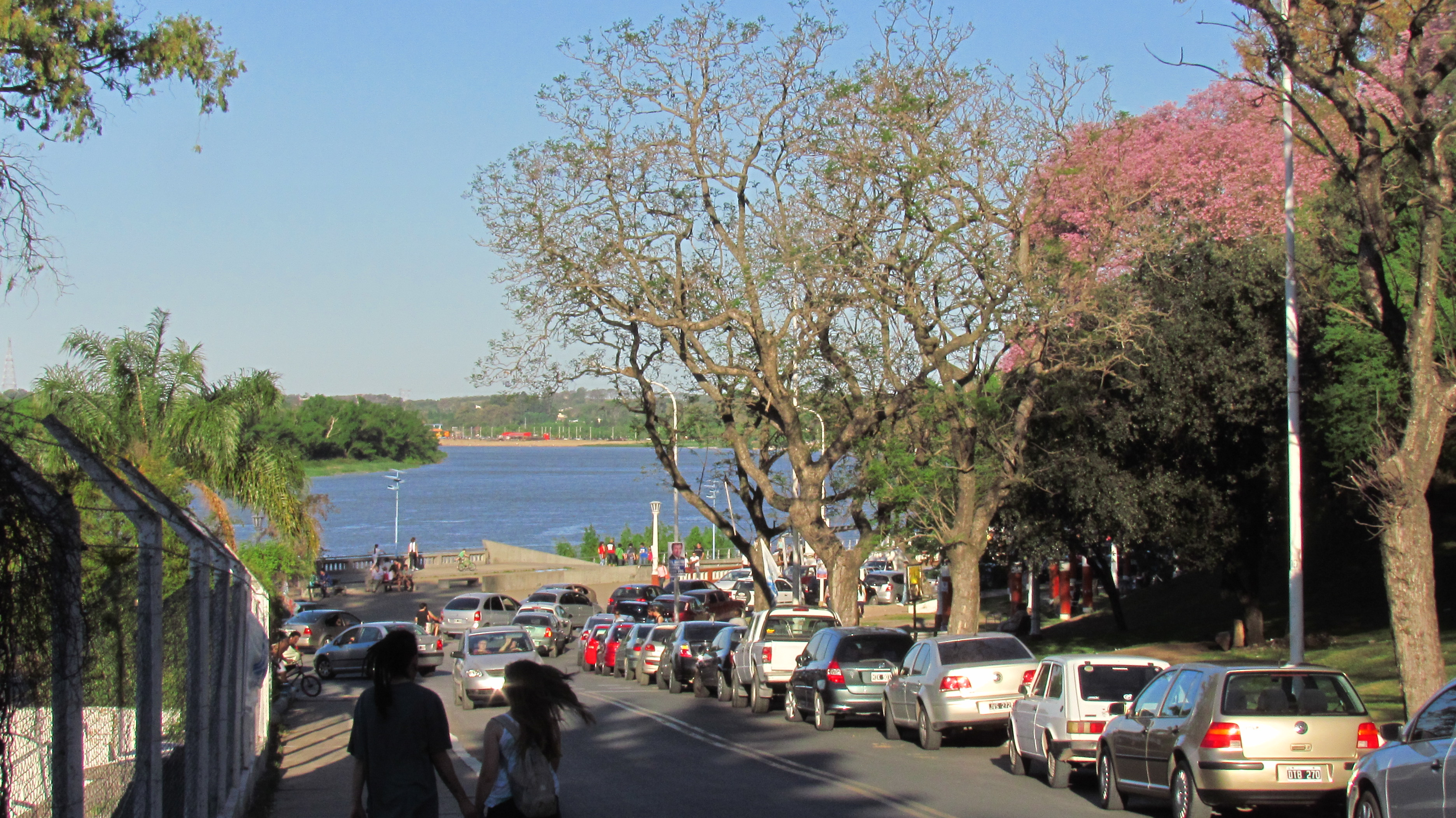

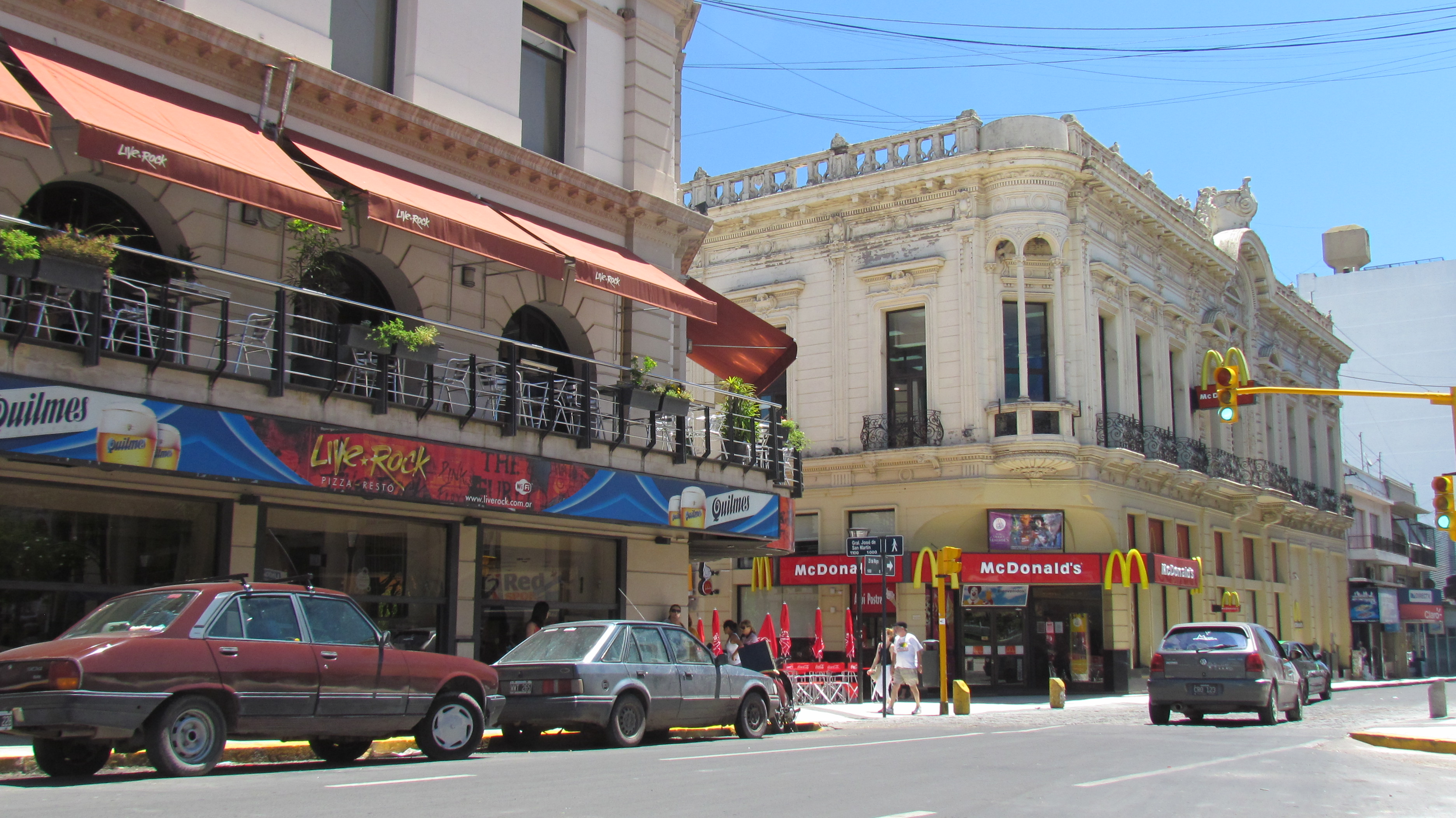

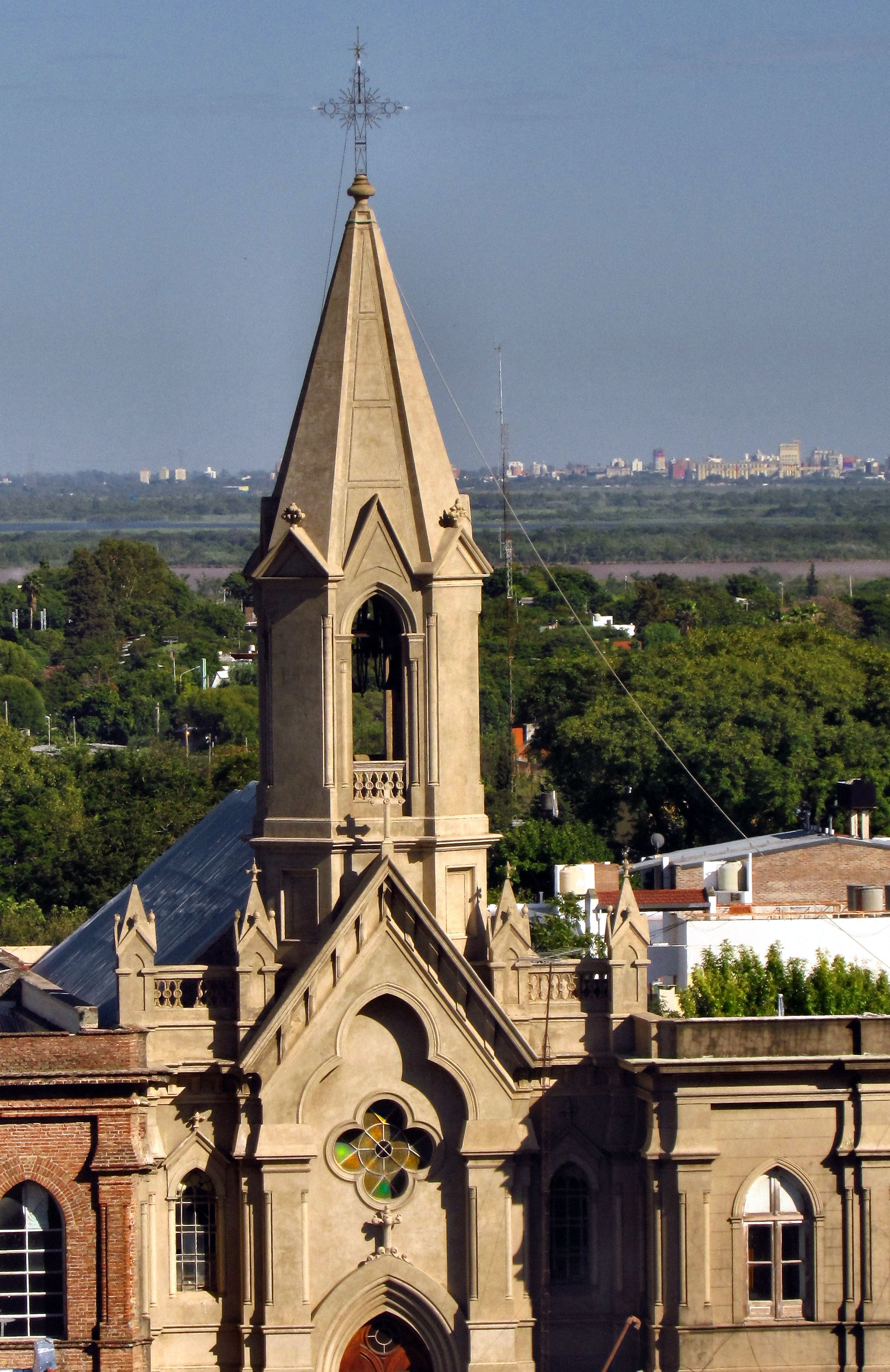

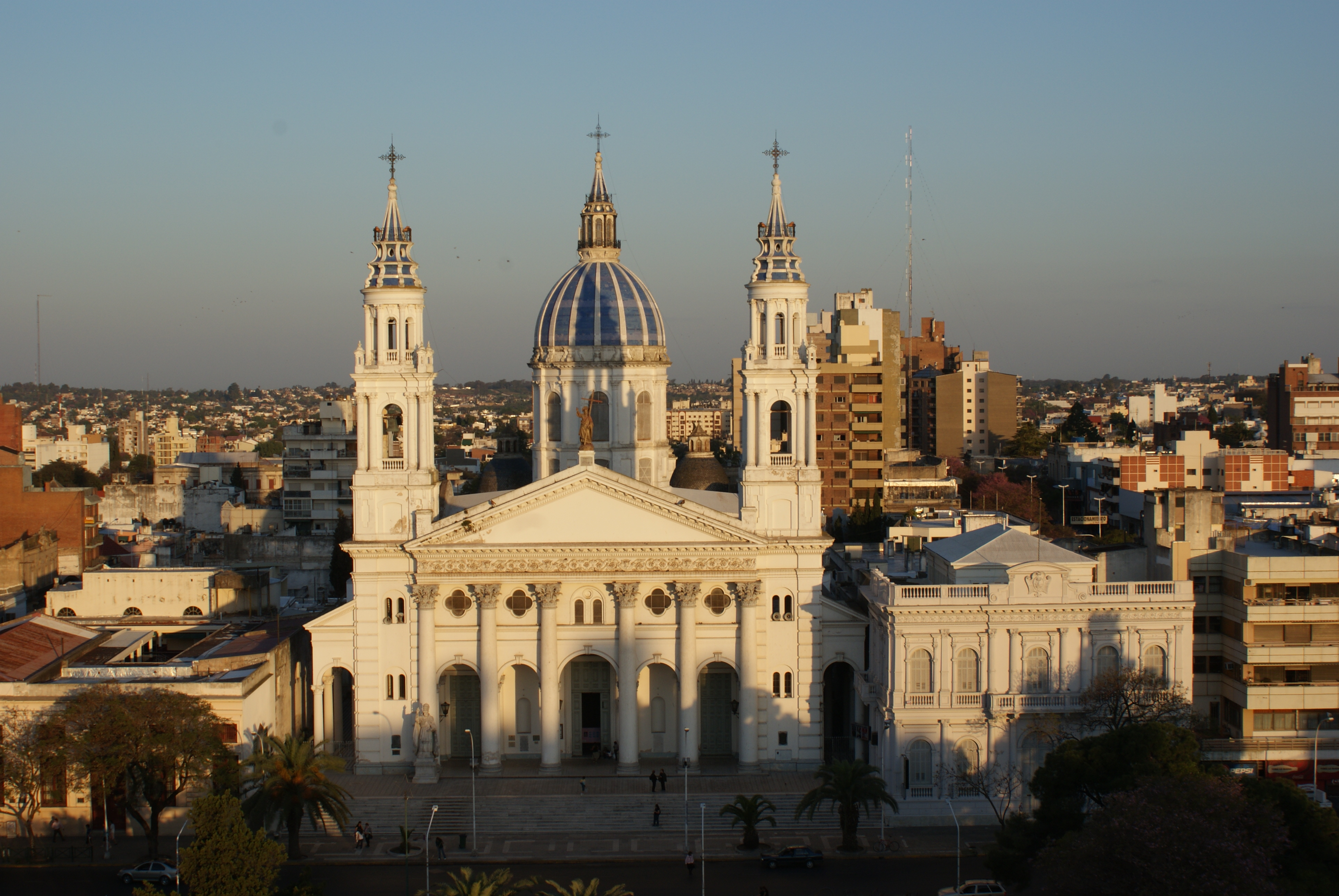

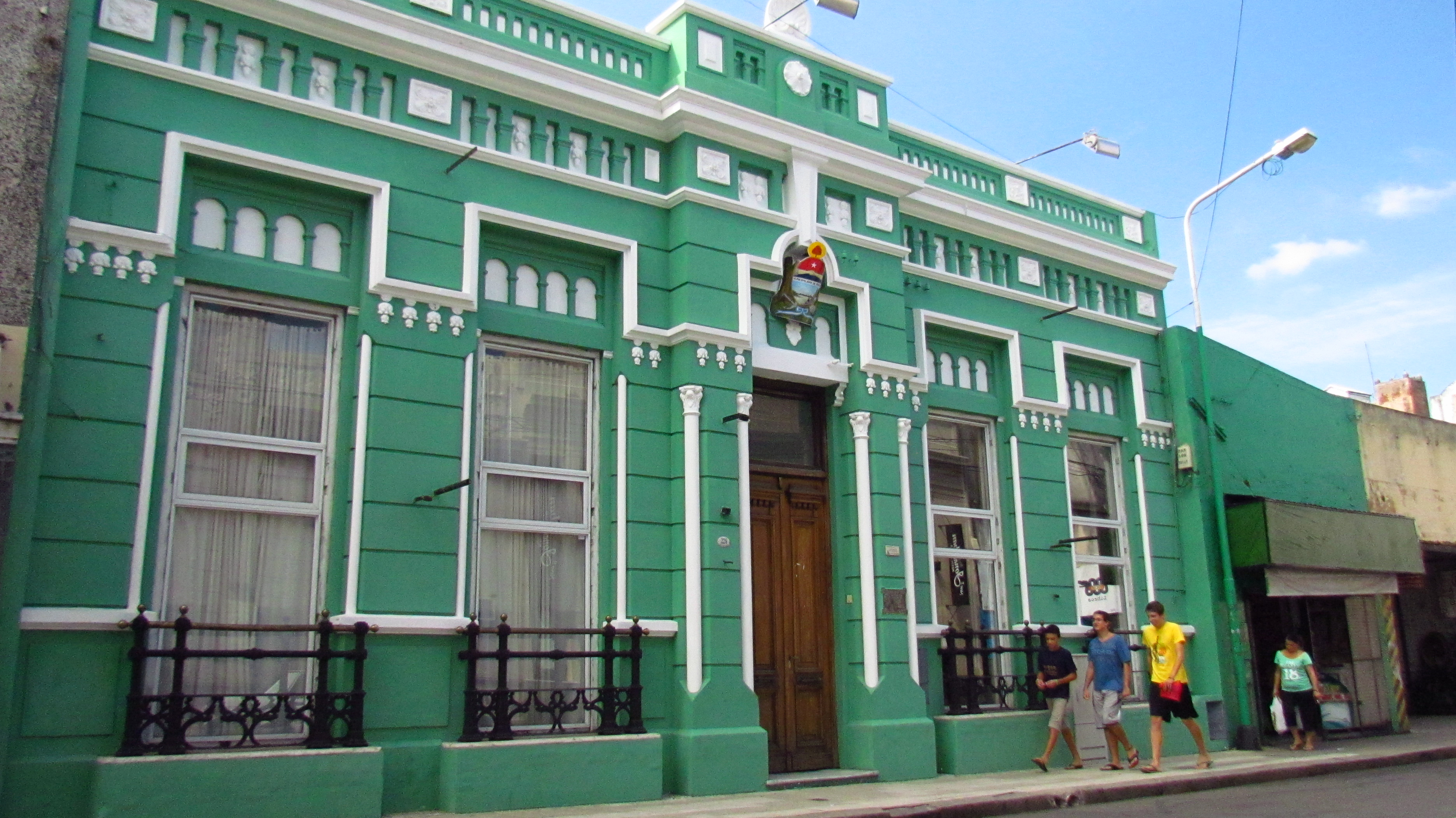

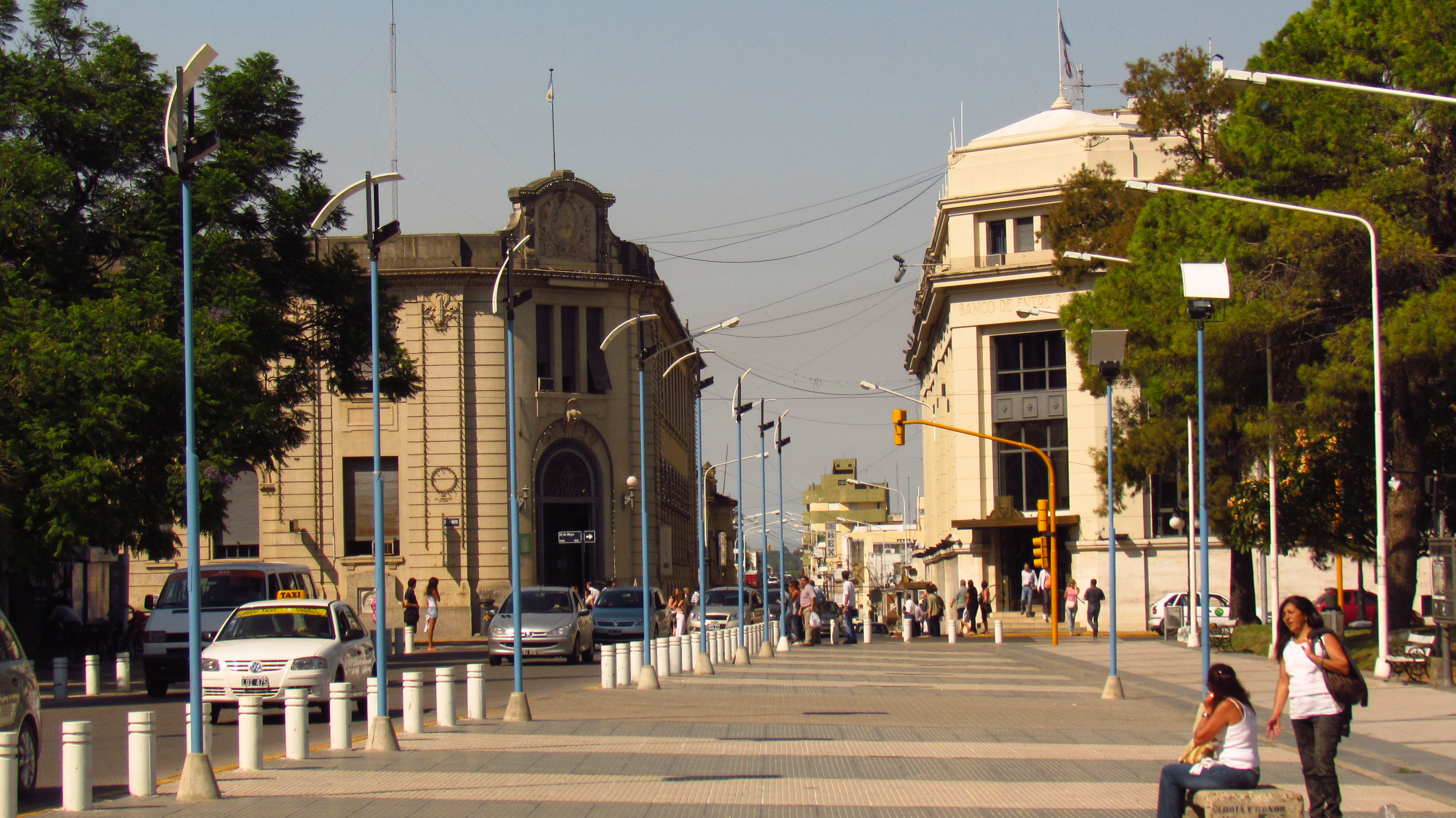

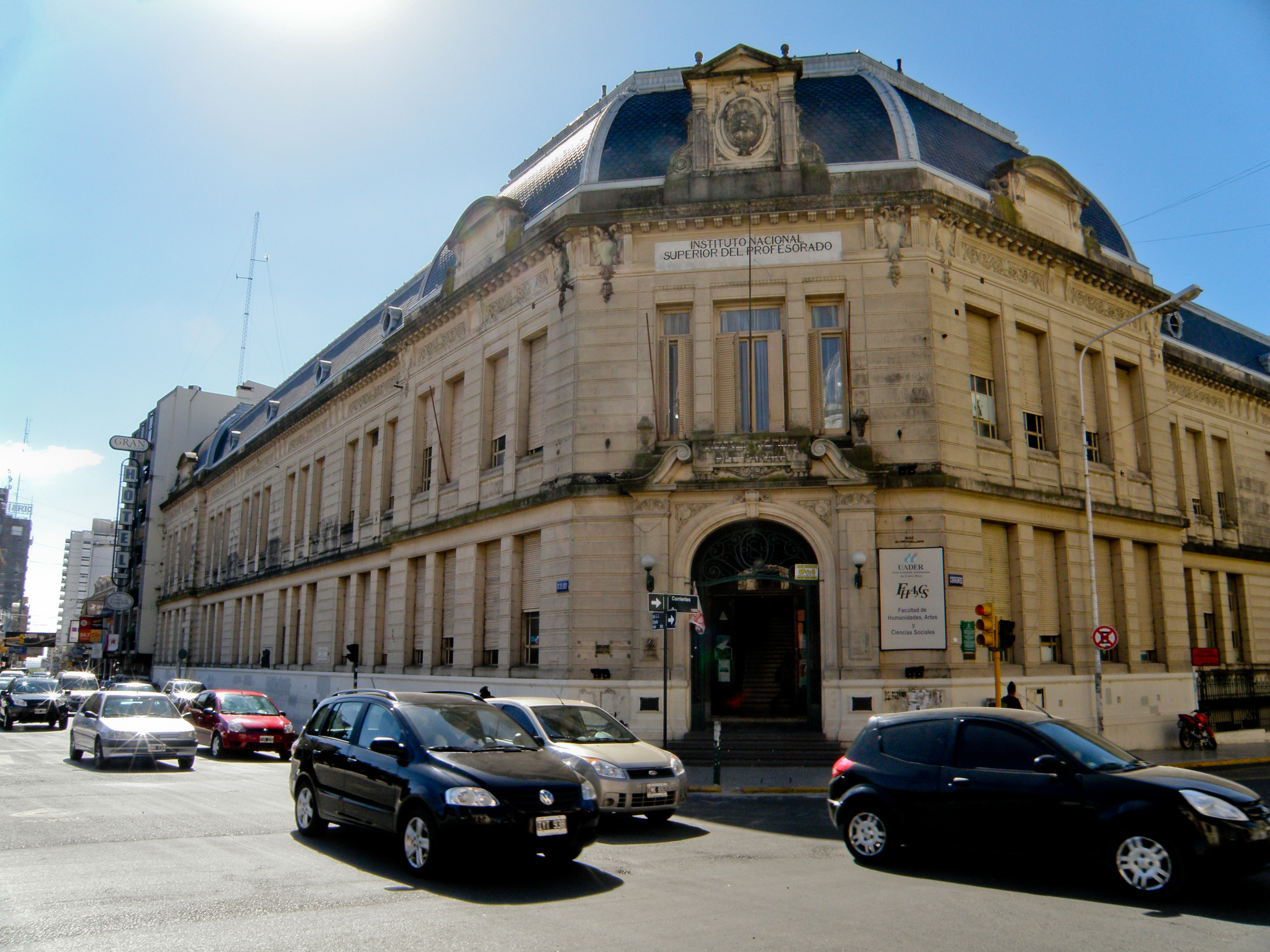

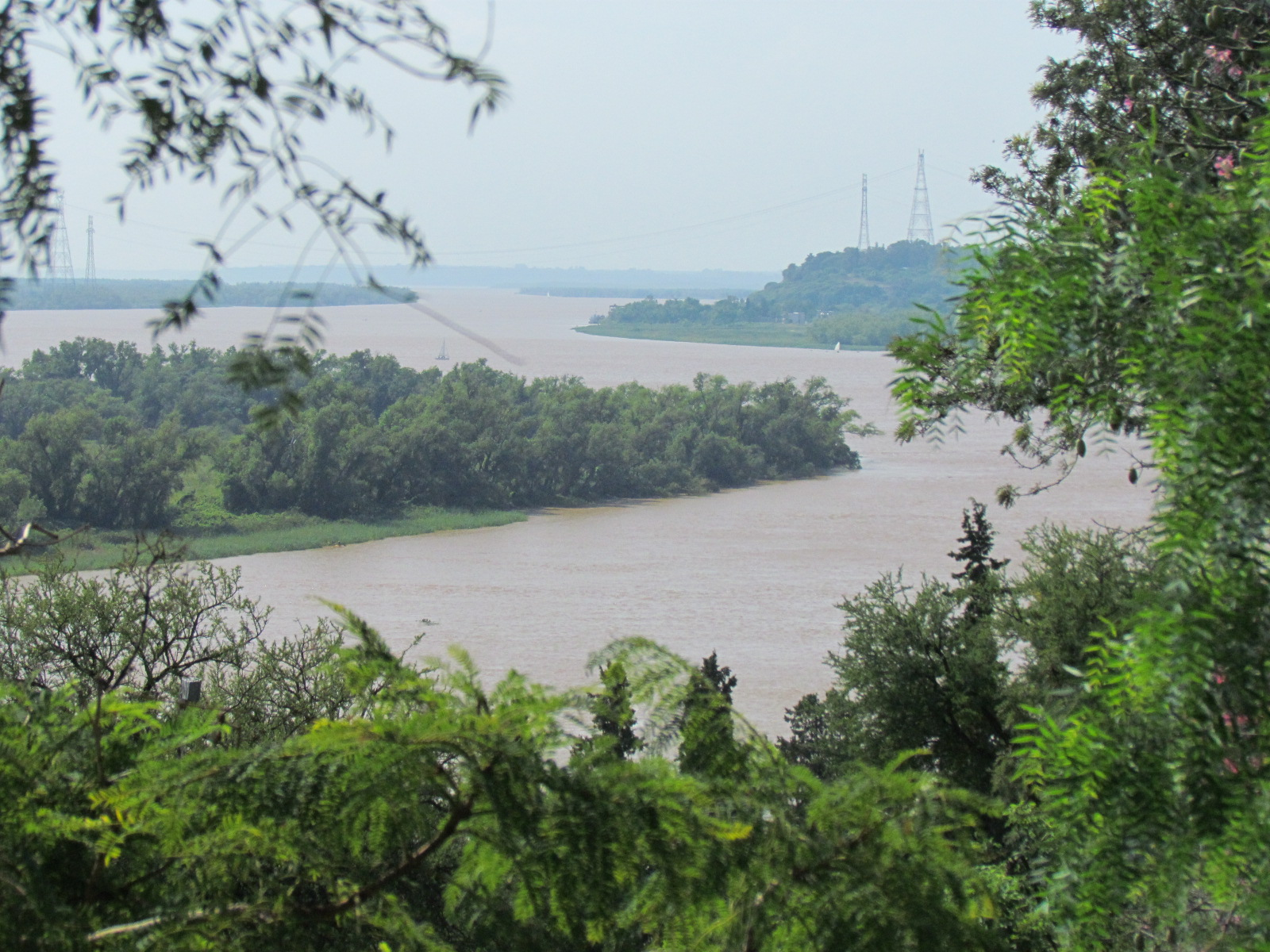

== Sister cities ==
- Salto, Uruguay
- Santa Cruz de la Sierra, Bolivia
- Muscatine, United States
- Quebec City, Canada
- Leonforte, Italy

== Notable people ==
- Facundo Affranchino (born 1990), footballer
- Fernando Alloco (born 1986), footballer
- Alejandro Almada (born 1990), footballer
- Walter Andrade (born 1984), footballer
- Ignacio Arce (born 1992), footballer
- Martín Aruga (born 1998), footballer
- Roberto Ayala (born 1973), footballer
- Juan Barinaga (born 2000), footballer
- Sebastián Bertoli (born 1977), footballer
- Poldy Bird (1941–2018), writer and poet
- Iván Borghello (born 1983), footballer
- Roberto Breppe (born 1941), cyclist
- Edgardo Brittes (born 1982), footballer
- Jorge Cáceres (1917–1975), modern pentathlete
- Evaristo Carriego (1883–1912), poet
- Martin Castrogiovanni (born 1981), Italy international rugby player born in the city
- María Caviglia (1895–1985), politician
- Andrés Chabrillón (1887–1968), poet and writer
- Juan Pablo Cantero (born 1982), basketball player
- Juan Cavallaro (born 1994), footballer
- Gastón Comas (born 1998), footballer
- Lautaro Comas (born 1995), footballer
- Román Comas (born 1999), footballer
- Faustino Dettler (born 1998), footballer
- Juan Cruz Franzoni (born 1999), footballer
- María Eugenia Duré (born 1980), politician
- Mateo Franzotti (born 2003), footballer
- Martín Gaitán (born 1978), rugby union player and coach
- Miguel Galuccio (born 1968), petroleum engineer
- Manuel Gálvez (1882–1962), writer
- Lautaro Geminiani (born 1991), footballer
- León Genuth (1931–2022), wrestler
- Betina Jozami (born 1988), tennis player
- Tomás Ledesma (born 1994), politician
- Eduardo Lell (born 1964), footballer
- Salvador Maciá (1855–1929), Governor of Entre Ríos Province
- Rodrigo Marangoni (born 1978), footballer
- Lucas Márquez (born 1988), footballer
- Emilio Eduardo Massera (1925–2010), military officer
- Ernesto Michel (born 1970), basketball player
- Marcos Minetti (born 1989), footballer
- Fausto Montero (born 1988), footballer
- Emanuel Moreno (born 1990), footballer
- Florencia Mutio (born 1984), field hockey player
- Javier Ortega Desio (born 1990), rugby union player
- Agustín Pastorelli (born 1997), footballer
- Damián Patriarca (born 1983), tennis player
- Enrique Pérez Colman (1886–1957), writer and politician
- Joaquín Pereyra (born 1998), footballer
- Osvaldo Ramírez (born 1984), footballer
- Eric Remedi (born 1995), footballer
- Diego Reynoso (born 1981), footballer
- Matías Roskopf (born 1998), footballer
- Matías Russo (born 1985), racing driver
- Agustín Sandona (born 1993), footballer
- Raúl Sanguineti (1933–2000), chess player
- Gastón Sangoy (born 1984), footballer
- Alejandro de los Santos (1902–1982), footballer
- Yamil Silva (born 1996), footballer
- Damián Steinert (born 1986), footballer
- Ignacio Verdura (1931–2018), equestrian
- María Inés Valla (born 1956), engineer
- Renzo Vera (born 1983), footballer
- Mariano Werner (born 1988), racing driver
