= Mateo Franzotti =

Argentine footballer (born 2003)

Personal information
- Full name: Mateo García Franzotti
- Date of birth: 3 February 2003 (age 23)
- Place of birth: Paraná, Argentina
- Height: 1.84 m (6 ft 0 in)
- Positions: Left-back; centre-back

Team information
- Current team: Wacker Innsbruck
- Number: 21

Youth career
- –2023: Unión de Santa Fe

College career
Years	Team	Apps	(Gls)
2024	Kentucky Wildcats	16	(1)

Senior career*
Years	Team	Apps	(Gls)
2025–	Wacker Innsbruck	22	(1)
- * Club domestic league appearances and goals as of 26 June 2026

Mateo García Franzotti (born 3 February 2003) is an Argentine professional footballer who plays as a left-back for Austrian club Wacker Innsbruck.

== Club career ==
Born in Paraná, Entre Ríos, Franzotti developed in the academy of Unión de Santa Fe. In 2021, a Uruguayan company affiliated with German football club FC Bayern Munich contacted representatives from Argentina, requesting highlight videos for defenders. Franzotti, alongside teammate and compatriot Gerónimo Vidal, was selected to be part of the FC Bayern Munich World Squad, representing the Bavarian club in international friendlies.

In 2024, he joined the college team Kentucky Wildcats in the United States, where he amassed sixteen appearances, scoring once. However, in January 2025, he signed with Wacker Innsbruck in Austria.

== Career statistics ==
=== Club ===
As of 27 February 2023.

Appearances and goals by club, season and competition
Club	Season	League			Cup (Note: Includes Austrian Cup)		Other		Total	
Club	Season	Division	Apps	Goals	Apps	Goals	Apps	Goals	Apps	Goals
Wacker Innsbruck	2024–25	Regionalliga Tirol	11	0	0	0	0	0	0	0
Wacker Innsbruck	2025–26	Regionalliga West	4	1	1	0	0	0	5	1
Career total			15	1	1	0	0	0	16	1
