= Christian Chimino =

Argentine footballer (born 1988)

Personal information
- Date of birth: 9 February 1988 (age 38)
- Place of birth: Luján, Argentina
- Height: 1.80 m (5 ft 11 in)
- Position: Right-back

Team information
- Current team: Olimpo

Youth career
- Ferro Carril Oeste

Senior career*
Years	Team	Apps	(Gls)
2010–2014	Ferro Carril Oeste	88	(2)
2014	Arsenal de Sarandí	4	(1)
2015–2017	Temperley	60	(5)
2017–2019	Huracán	42	(0)
2019–2021	Patronato	26	(2)
2021–2022	Atlético de Rafaela	29	(2)
2022–2023	Arsenal de Sarandí	25	(1)
2023	Tristán Suárez	5	(0)
2023	Aldosivi	2	(0)
2023–2024	Arsenal de Sarandí	9	(0)
2024–2025	Luján	39	(7)
2025–2026	Comunicaciones	31	(4)
2026–	Olimpo	3	(0)
- * Club domestic league appearances and goals as of 16:40, 14 April 2026 (UTC)

Christian Chimino (born 9 February 1988) is an Argentine professional footballer who plays as a right-back for Olimpo.

== Career ==
Chimino's career began with Ferro Carril Oeste in Primera B Nacional in 2010, with his first professional appearance coming against Unión Santa Fe on 5 March. Three seasons later, Chimino scored his first senior goal in April 2013 versus Gimnasia y Esgrima. In June 2014, Chimino departed Ferro Carril Oeste after eighty-eight appearances and two goals to join Arsenal de Sarandí of the Argentine Primera División. He went on to play four fixtures for Arsenal, scoring in his final match during a 1–6 win away to Atlético de Rafaela on 6 December 2014. 2015 saw Chimino sign for fellow Primera División team Temperley.

He subsequently started all thirty of Temperley's fixtures during the 2015 campaign. Chimino remained with Temperley for three seasons, scoring five times in sixty-two matches. On 6 July 2017, Chimino was signed by Huracán. His debut for the club arrived on 2 August in the 2017 Copa Sudamericana during a defeat to Libertad of Paraguay. Patronato, ahead of 2019–20, announced the signing of Chimino on 21 June 2019, eight days after Huracán had informed him that his contract wouldn't be renewed, controversially, via WhatsApp.

After a spell at Atlético de Rafaela in 2021, Chimino returned to his former club, Arsenal de Sarandí, in January 2022.

== Career statistics ==
As of 21 June 2019.

Club statistics
Club	Season	League			Cup		League Cup		Continental		Other		Total	
Club	Season	Division	Apps	Goals	Apps	Goals	Apps	Goals	Apps	Goals	Apps	Goals	Apps	Goals
Ferro Carril Oeste	2009–10	Primera B Nacional	10	0	0	0	—		—		0	0	10	0
Ferro Carril Oeste	2010–11	Primera B Nacional	21	0	0	0	—		—		0	0	21	0
Ferro Carril Oeste	2011–12	Primera B Nacional	11	0	0	0	—		—		0	0	11	0
Ferro Carril Oeste	2012–13	Primera B Nacional	9	2	0	0	—		—		0	0	9	2
Ferro Carril Oeste	2013–14	Primera B Nacional	37	0	0	0	—		—		0	0	37	0
Ferro Carril Oeste	Total		88	2	0	0	—		—		0	0	88	2
Arsenal de Sarandí	2014	Primera División	4	1	0	0	—		0	0	0	0	4	1
Temperley	2015	Primera División	30	1	2	0	—		—		0	0	32	1
Temperley	2016	Primera División	14	1	0	0	—		—		0	0	14	1
Temperley	2016–17	Primera División	16	3	0	0	—		—		0	0	16	3
Temperley	Total		60	5	2	0	—		—		0	0	62	5
Huracán	2017–18	Primera División	22	0	2	0	—		1 (Note: Appearance(s) in the Copa Sudamericana)	0	0	0	25	0
Huracán	2018–19	Primera División	20	0	1	0	—		4 (Note: Appearance(s) in the Copa Libertadores)	0	0	0	25	0
Huracán	Total		42	0	3	0	—		5	0	0	0	50	0
Career total			194	8	5	0	—		5	0	0	0	204	8
