= Osvaldo Ramírez (footballer, born 1984) =

Argentine professional footballer

Personal information
- Full name: Osvaldo Manuel Ramírez
- Date of birth: 15 March 1984 (age 42)
- Place of birth: Paraná, Argentina
- Height: 1.80 m (5 ft 11 in)
- Position: Midfielder

Youth career
- Universitario Paraná
- Agrupación Deportivo Francia
- 1999–2001: Independiente
- 2001–2003: Colón
- 2004: Unión Santa Fe

Senior career*
| Years | Team | Apps | (Gls) |
| 2004–2005 | Talleres | 5 | (0) |
| 2005–2006 | Atlético Paraná | | |
| 2006–2008 | 9 de Julio | 43 | (6) |
| 2008–2010 | Deportivo Roca | 36 | (2) |
| 2010–2011 | Atlético Paraná | | |
| 2011–2012 | Sarmiento | 22 | (0) |
| 2012–2013 | Central Córdoba | 4 | (0) |
| 2013–2014 | Belgrano | 7 | (0) |
| 2015–2017 | Sportivo Patria | 38 | (1) |
| 2017–2018 | Chaco For Ever | 21 | (1) |
| 2018–2019 | All Boys | 15 | (0) |
- * Club domestic league appearances and goals

Osvaldo Manuel Ramírez (born 15 March 1984) is an Argentine retired professional footballer who played as a midfielder.

== Career ==
Ramírez got his career underway in the ranks of Universitario Paraná, though soon left for Agrupación Deportivo Francia. Youth moves to Independiente, Colón and Unión Santa Fe then occurred. Primera B Metropolitana side Talleres were Ramírez's first senior club, as he featured five times in the 2004–05 campaign. He spent the succeeding year with Atlético Paraná, before moving on to fellow Torneo Argentino B outfit 9 de Julio. After six goals in forty-three for the aforementioned team, Ramírez signed for Deportivo Roca in 2008. Thirty-six matches and two goals followed in two seasons, which preceded a return to Atlético Paraná.

Further stints with Sarmiento and Belgrano arrived, either side of a spell with Central Córdoba in Torneo Argentino A; where he played in four fixtures. In January 2015, Ramírez joined Sportivo Patria. His first appearance came in a win against Unión Sunchales in May, while he netted for the first time in Sportivo Patria colours on 1 August versus Andino. He remained for three campaigns in Torneo Federal A, making forty total appearances for them alongside two goals. Ramírez then appeared for Chaco For Ever throughout 2017–18, notably receiving a red card during his final encounter on 15 April 2018 in a 2–1 victory over Alvarado.

All Boys, of Primera B Metropolitana, became Ramírez's tenth senior club in July 2018. He made his debut in a fixture with Sacachispas on 29 August.

== Career statistics ==
As of 16 April 2019.

Appearances and goals by club, season and competition
| Club | Season | League | | | Cup | | Continental | | Other | | Total | |
| Club | Season | Division | Apps | Goals | Apps | Goals | Apps | Goals | Apps | Goals | Apps | Goals |
|---|---|---|---|---|---|---|---|---|---|---|---|---|
| Talleres | 2004–05 | Primera B Metropolitana | 5 | 0 | 0 | 0 | — | | 0 | 0 | 5 | 0 |
| Sarmiento | 2011–12 | Torneo Argentino B | 22 | 0 | 0 | 0 | — | | 0 | 0 | 22 | 0 |
| Central Córdoba | 2012–13 | Torneo Argentino A | 4 | 0 | 1 | 0 | — | | 0 | 0 | 5 | 0 |
| Sportivo Patria | 2015 | Torneo Federal A | 16 | 1 | 0 | 0 | — | | 0 | 0 | 16 | 1 |
| Sportivo Patria | 2016 | Torneo Federal A | 10 | 0 | 0 | 0 | — | | 0 | 0 | 10 | 0 |
| Sportivo Patria | 2016–17 | Torneo Federal A | 12 | 0 | 0 | 0 | — | | 2 (Note: Appearance(s) in the Torneo Federal A play-offs) | 1 | 14 | 1 |
| Sportivo Patria | Total | | 38 | 1 | 0 | 0 | — | | 2 | 1 | 40 | 2 |
| Chaco For Ever | 2017–18 | Torneo Federal A | 21 | 1 | 1 | 0 | — | | 0 | 0 | 22 | 1 |
| All Boys | 2018–19 | Primera B Metropolitana | 9 | 0 | 1 | 0 | — | | 0 | 0 | 10 | 0 |
| Career total | | | 99 | 2 | 3 | 0 | — | | 2 | 1 | 104 | 3 |
