= Juan Cruz Franzoni =

Argentine footballer

Personal information
- Date of birth: 17 October 1999 (age 27)
- Place of birth: Paraná, Argentina
- Height: 1.80 m (5 ft 11 in)
- Position: Centre-forward

Team information
- Current team: Villa Dálmine

Youth career
- Patronato

Senior career*
Years	Team	Apps	(Gls)
2018–2020	Patronato	10	(0)
2020–2021	Sarmiento	2	(0)
2021–	Villa Dálmine	8	(0)
- * Club domestic league appearances and goals as of 18 July 2021

Juan Cruz Franzoni (born 17 October 1999) is an Argentine professional footballer who plays as a centre-forward for Villa Dálmine.

== Club career ==
Franzoni got his senior career underway with Patronato in 2018. He was an unused substitute for an Primera División match with Rosario Central on 1 April, prior to making his debut on 6 May in the final moments of Patronato's last away game of 2017–18 versus Temperley; the club won both fixtures. He remained until the end of 2019–20, making a total of eleven appearances for the club; though all came as a substitute. October 2020 saw Franzoni join Primera Nacional's Sarmiento. He appeared off the bench in goalless draws with Villa Dálmine and Atlético de Rafaela, before departing in March 2021 to the aforementioned Villa Dálmine.

== International career ==
In March 2018, Franzoni was called up to train with the Argentina U19s.

== Career statistics ==
As of 11 March 2021.

Club statistics
Club	Season	League			Cup		League Cup		Continental		Other		Total	
Club	Season	Division	Apps	Goals	Apps	Goals	Apps	Goals	Apps	Goals	Apps	Goals	Apps	Goals
Patronato	2017–18	Primera División	1	0	0	0	—		—		0	0	1	0
Patronato	2018–19	Primera División	4	0	0	0	0	0	—		0	0	4	0
Patronato	2019–20	Primera División	5	0	1	0	0	0	—		0	0	6	0
Patronato	Total		10	0	1	0	0	0	—		0	0	11	0
Sarmiento	2020	Primera Nacional	2	0	0	0	—		—		0	0	2	0
Villa Dálmine	2021	Primera Nacional	0	0	0	0	—		—		0	0	0	0
Career total			12	0	1	0	0	0	—		0	0	13	0
