= Pablo Cortizo =

Argentine footballer

Personal information
- Full name: Pablo Oscar Cortizo
- Date of birth: September 1, 1989 (age 37)
- Place of birth: La Plata, Argentina
- Height: 1.86 m (6 ft 1 in)
- Position: Defensive midfielder

Team information
- Current team: Los Andes

Youth career
- 2008–2010: Ferro Carril Oeste

Senior career*
Years	Team	Apps	(Gls)
2011	Colegio Nacional Iquitos	13	(0)
2012–2013	Racing Club	20	(0)
2013–2014	Inter Turku	9	(0)
2014	Ayia Napa	13	(0)
2014–2015	Tiro Federal	15	(0)
2015	Atlanta	25	(2)
2016–2017	Gimnasia Jujuy	25	(0)
2017–2019	Gimnasia Mendoza	56	(2)
2019–2020	Patronato	3	(0)
2020–2021	Mitre	3	(0)
2021	Brown de Adrogué	28	(0)
2022	Independiente Rivadavia	2	(0)
2022–	Los Andes	8	(0)
- * Club domestic league appearances and goals as of 17:14, 7 August 2022 (UTC)

Pablo Cortizo (born September 1, 1989, in La Plata) is an Argentine footballer currently playing as a defensive midfielder for Los Andes.

== Game Features ==
Pablo is a central midfielder with technical characteristics and vision of the game. He uses his height to go head both in attack and defence and balls in motion, fast delivery of the ball and is a tidy player tactically able to meet the necessary requirements.
