= José Barreto (Argentine footballer) =

Argentine footballer

Personal information
- Full name: José Alberto Barreto
- Date of birth: 22 February 2000 (age 26)
- Place of birth: Villa Clara, Argentina
- Position: Forward

Team information
- Current team: Quilmes

Youth career
- Patronato

Senior career*
Years	Team	Apps	(Gls)
2019–2022	Patronato	26	(0)
2021–2022	→ Tristán Suárez (loan)	23	(1)
2023	Gimnasia CdU	15	(1)
2023–2024	Deportivo Mandiyú	5	(1)
2024–2025	San Telmo	39	(7)
2025–2026	Colón	21	(0)
2026–	Quilmes	7	(0)
- * Club domestic league appearances and goals as of 17:40, 18 April 2026 (UTC)

José Alberto Barreto (born 22 February 2000) is an Argentine professional footballer who plays as a forward for Quilmes.

== Career ==
Barreto's career started with Patronato. Mario Sciacqua promoted the forward into the club's first-team squad during the 2018–19 season in the Primera División, with Barreto making his first professional appearance on 22 February 2019 - his nineteenth birthday - in a 2–1 loss away to Tigre.

== Career statistics ==
As of 23 February 2019.

Appearances and goals by club, season and competition
Club	Season	League			Cup		Continental		Other		Total	
Club	Season	Division	Apps	Goals	Apps	Goals	Apps	Goals	Apps	Goals	Apps	Goals
Patronato	2018–19	Primera División	1	0	0	0	—		0	0	1	0
Career total			1	0	0	0	—		0	0	1	0
