= Walter Andrade (footballer, born 1984) =

Argentine footballer

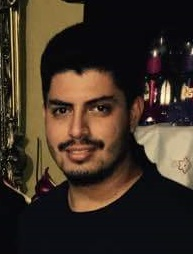

Personal information
- Full name: Walter Saúl Andrade
- Date of birth: 1 December 1984 (age 41)
- Place of birth: Paraná, Argentina
- Height: 1.90 m (6 ft 3 in)
- Position: Centre-back

Senior career*
Years	Team	Apps	(Gls)
2002–2003	Sportivo Urquiza		
2004	Atletico Hernandarias		
2005–2020	Patronato	373	(18)
- * Club domestic league appearances and goals

Walter Saúl Andrade (born 1 December 1984) is a retired Argentine professional footballer who played as a centre-back.

== Career ==
Andrade started his senior career with Sportivo Urquiza in 2002 in the regional leagues, prior to joining Torneo Argentino B's Atletico Hernandarias in 2004. A year later, Andrade joined fellow Torneo Argentino B side Patronato. In his first three seasons with the club, he made sixty-one appearances and scored four goals. Patronato were promoted to Torneo Argentino A in 2008, where they remained until 2010 when they were promoted to Primera B Nacional. Andrade made his professional debut on 4 September 2010 versus Rosario Central, before scoring his first pro goal in February 2011 against San Martín.

At the conclusion of the 2015 Primera B Nacional season, Patronato were promoted to the Argentine Primera División; Andrade had scored nine goals in one hundred and ninety matches in six Primera B Nacional campaigns. He subsequently made thirty-five appearances in his first two seasons in the Primera División, scoring one goal in a draw with Aldosivi on 9 December 2016. Including local Liga Paranaense matches, Andrade has made over 400 appearances for Patronato.

On 30 June 2020, Andrade announced his retirement from football.

== Honours ==
Patronato

- Torneo Argentino B: 2007–08
- Torneo Argentino A: 2009–10
