= Santiago Briñone =

Argentine footballer

Personal information
- Full name: Santiago Briñone
- Date of birth: 28 December 1996 (age 29)
- Place of birth: Santa Rosa, Argentina
- Height: 1.90 m (6 ft 3 in)
- Position: Attacking midfielder

Team information
- Current team: San Martín Tucumán

Youth career
- Santa Rosa
- 2012–2015: Talleres
- 2016–2018: Patronato

Senior career*
Years	Team	Apps	(Gls)
2018–2021	Patronato	15	(0)
2021–2022	Sportivo Las Parejas	28	(3)
2022–2023	Sportivo Estudiantes	31	(3)
2023–2026	Estudiantes BA	88	(6)
2026–	San Martín Tucumán	9	(0)
- * Club domestic league appearances and goals as of 17:30, 4 May 2026 (UTC)

Santiago Briñone (born 28 December 1996) is an Argentine professional footballer who plays as an attacking midfielder for San Martín Tucumán.

== Career ==
Briñone began in the ranks of local team Santa Rosa, prior to subsequently having spells with Talleres and Patronato. He was promoted into Patronato's first-team by caretaker manager Martín de León, who selected Briñone to start in an Argentine Primera División match with San Lorenzo on 21 September 2018; with the forward featuring for sixty-seven minutes of a 3–2 defeat.

After spending the 2021 season at Sportivo Las Parejas, Briñone moved to Sportivo Estudiantes in January 2022.

== Career statistics ==
As of 24 October 2018.

Club statistics
Club	Season	League			Cup (Note: Includes the Copa Argentina)		League Cup		Continental		Other		Total	
Club	Season	Division	Apps	Goals	Apps	Goals	Apps	Goals	Apps	Goals	Apps	Goals	Apps	Goals
Patronato	2018–19	Primera División	1	0	0	0	—		—		0	0	1	0
Career total			1	0	0	0	—		—		0	0	1	0
