= 2017–18 Club Atlético Patronato season =

Club Atlético Patronato
2017–18 season
- Chairman: José Alberto Gómez
- Manager: Rubén Forestello (until 3 July 2017); Juan Pablo Pumpido (from 6 July 2017)
- Stadium: Estadio Presbítero Bartolomé Grella
- Primera División: 18th
- Copa Argentina: Round of 64
- Top goalscorer: League: Sebastián Ribas (9); All: Sebastián Ribas (9)

The 2017–18 season is Club Atlético Patronato's 3rd consecutive season in the top-flight of Argentine football. The season covers the period from 1 July 2017 to 30 June 2018.

== Current squad ==
As of 18 September 2017.

Note: Flags indicate national team as defined under FIFA eligibility rules; some limited exceptions apply. Players may hold more than one non-FIFA nationality.

No.	Pos.	Nation	Player
1	GK	ARG	Sebastián Bertoli
2	DF	ARG	Walter Andrade
3	DF	ARG	Lucas Márquez
4	DF	ARG	Lautaro Geminiani
5	MF	ARG	Marcelo Guzmán
6	DF	ARG	Iván Furios
9	FW	ARG	Matías Quiroga
10	MF	ARG	Matías Garrido
13	DF	ARG	Marcos Minetti
14	GK	ARG	Federico Costa
18	MF	ARG	Tomás Spinelli
24	MF	ARG	Damián Lemos
27	MF	ARG	Yamil Silva
30	GK	ARG	Emanuel Alarcón
32	FW	ARG	Mauricio Carrasco
33	DF	ARG	Renzo Vera
39	DF	ARG	Marcos Maydana

No.	Pos.	Nation	Player
—	MF	ARG	Abel Peralta
—	FW	URU	Adrián Balboa
—	DF	ARG	Agustín Sandona
—	MF	PAR	Alberto Contrera (on loan from Guaraní)
—	MF	PAR	Blas Cáceres
—	DF	ARG	Bruno Urribarri
—	MF	VEN	Darwin González (on loan from Deportivo La Guaira)
—	FW	ARG	Gonzalo Di Renzo (on loan from Lanús)
—	DF	ARG	Julián Marchioni (on loan from Estudiantes)
—	MF	ARG	Leonardo Morales
—	DF	ARG	Luca Sosa (on loan from Huracán)
—	MF	ARG	Martín Rivero
—	DF	ARG	Rodrigo Arciero
—	FW	ARG	Rodrigo Migone (on loan from Rosario Central)
—	DF	ARG	Santiago López (on loan from San Lorenzo)
—	FW	URU	Sebastián Ribas

=== Out on loan ===
Note: Flags indicate national team as defined under FIFA eligibility rules; some limited exceptions apply. Players may hold more than one non-FIFA nationality.

No.	Pos.	Nation	Player
7	MF	ARG	Alejandro Gagliardi (at Chacarita Juniors until 30 June 2018)
20	MF	ARG	Lautaro Comas (at O'Higgins until 31 December 2018)

== Transfers ==
=== In ===
Date	Pos.	Name	From	Fee
14 July 2017	MF	(Argentina) Abel Peralta	(Argentina) Temperley	Undisclosed
16 July 2017	FW	(Uruguay) Adrián Balboa	(Uruguay) Liverpool Montevideo	Undisclosed
16 July 2017	MF	(Paraguay) Blas Cáceres	(Paraguay) Cerro Porteño	Undisclosed
16 July 2017	DF	(Argentina) Bruno Urribarri	(Argentina) Tigre	Undisclosed
16 July 2017	MF	(Argentina) Martín Rivero	(Argentina) Unión Santa Fe	Undisclosed
31 July 2017	MF	(Argentina) Leonardo Morales	(Argentina) Atlético Paraná	Undisclosed
31 July 2017	DF	(Argentina) Rodrigo Arciero	(Argentina) Independiente Rivadavia	Undisclosed
23 August 2017	DF	(Argentina) Agustín Sandona	(Argentina) Unión Santa Fe	Undisclosed
31 August 2017	FW	(Uruguay) Sebastián Ribas	(Ukraine) Karpaty Lviv	Undisclosed

=== Out ===
Date	Pos.	Name	To	Fee
1 July 2017	FW	(Chile) Gabriel Vargas	(Chile) Curicó Unido	Undisclosed
16 July 2017	MF	(Argentina) Damián Arce	(Argentina) Unión Santa Fe	Undisclosed
17 July 2017	MF	(Argentina) Alejandro Almada	(Argentina) San Jorge	Undisclosed
20 July 2017	FW	(Argentina) Fernando Telechea	(Argentina) Aldosivi	Undisclosed
31 July 2017	DF	(Argentina) Alexander Hollman	(Argentina) Atlético Paraná	Undisclosed
15 August 2017	DF	(Argentina) Abel Masuero	(Argentina) Brown	Undisclosed
31 August 2017	GK	(Argentina) Agustín Bossio	(Argentina) Atlético Paraná	Undisclosed

=== Loan in ===
Date from	Date to	Pos.	Name	From
20 July 2017	30 June 2018	MF	(Venezuela) Darwin González	(Venezuela) Deportivo La Guaira
20 July 2017	30 June 2018	DF	(Argentina) Julián Marchioni	(Argentina) Estudiantes
22 July 2017	30 June 2018	FW	(Argentina) Gonzalo Di Renzo	(Argentina) Lanús
25 July 2017	30 June 2018	MF	(Paraguay) Alberto Contrera	(Paraguay) Guaraní
26 July 2017	30 June 2018	DF	(Argentina) Luca Sosa	(Argentina) Huracán
3 August 2017	30 June 2018	DF	(Argentina) Santiago López	(Argentina) San Lorenzo
6 August 2017	30 June 2018	FW	(Argentina) Rodrigo Migone	(Argentina) Rosario Central

=== Loan out ===
Date from	Date to	Pos.	Name	To
1 July 2017	31 December 2018	MF	(Argentina) Lautaro Comas	(Chile) O'Higgins
23 August 2017	30 June 2018	MF	(Argentina) Alejandro Gagliardi	(Argentina) Chacarita Juniors

== Friendlies ==
Win Draw Loss

=== Pre-season ===
2 August 2017 Friendly	Patronato (Argentina)	0–0	(Argentina) Rosario Central	Arroyo Seco, Argentina
		Report

2 August 2017 Friendly	Patronato (Argentina)	5–1	(Argentina) Rosario Central	Arroyo Seco, Argentina
	A. Contrera 5', 30'; M. Quiroga 9'; D. González 32'; T. Spinelli 55'	Report	S. Romero 7'

5 August 2017 Friendly	Patronato (Argentina)	1–2	(Argentina) Olimpo	Paraná, Argentina
	B. Cáceres	Report	E. Tellechea; J. Blanco	Stadium: Estadio Presbítero Bartolomé Grella

5 August 2017 Friendly	Patronato (Argentina)	0–3	(Argentina) Olimpo	Paraná, Argentina
		Report	F. Troyansky; M. Covea; M. Fornari	Stadium: Estadio Presbítero Bartolomé Grella

12 August 2017 Friendly	Patronato (Argentina)	1–1	(Argentina) Newell's Old Boys	Rosario, Argentina
	A. Balboa	Report	J. Torres	Stadium: Polideportivo de Bella Vista

12 August 2017 Friendly	Patronato (Argentina)	0–2	(Argentina) Newell's Old Boys	Rosario, Argentina
		Report	M. Tévez; M. Tissera	Stadium: Polideportivo de Bella Vista

18 August 2017 Friendly	Patronato (Argentina)	2–0	(Argentina) Unión Sunchales	Paraná, Argentina
	A. Peralta	Report		Stadium: Estadio Presbítero Bartolomé Grella

=== Mid-season ===
2 September 2017 Friendly	Patronato (Argentina)	0–1	(Argentina) Unión Santa Fe Reserves	Paraná, Argentina
		Report	G. Ireba	Stadium: Estadio Presbítero Bartolomé Grella

2 September 2017 Friendly	Patronato (Argentina)	3–1	(Argentina) Unión Santa Fe Reserves	Paraná, Argentina
	M. Quiroga; D. González; A. Contrera	Report	Goal	Stadium: Estadio Presbítero Bartolomé Grella

== Primera División ==
=== League table ===
Pos	Team	Pld	W	D	L	GF	GA	GD	Pts	Qualification
17	Banfield	27	9	8	10	27	24	+3	35	
18	San Martín (SJ)	27	9	6	12	30	36	−6	33	
19	Patronato	27	8	9	10	26	32	−6	33	
20	Rosario Central	27	8	8	11	30	41	−11	32	Qualification for Copa Libertadores group stage (Note: Rosario Central qualified for the Copa Libertadores group stage by winning the 2017–18 Copa Argentina.)
21	Newell's Old Boys (Note: Newell's Old Boys were deducted one point for debts owed to former players. Originally AFA partially accepted the appeal by Newell's Old Boys reducing the penalty from three points to one point but a new appeal by Lanús overturned the decision. Finally, on 28 June 2019 CAS gave back two points to Newell´s Old Boys reducing the penalty to one point again.)	27	8	6	13	23	28	−5	29	

Source: AFA
Rules for classification: 1) points; 2) play-off (only if needed to decide championship); 3) goal difference; 4) goals scored; 5) head-to-head points; 6) head-to-head goal difference; 7) head-to-head goals scored.

=== Results by matchday ===
Matchday	1	2	3	4	5	6	7	8	9	10	11	12	13	14	15	16	17	18	19	20	21	22	23	24	25	26	27
Ground	A	H	A	H	A	H	A	H	A	H	A	H	A														
Result	L	W	W	W	L	L	D	D	L	L	D	W															
Position	25	17	6	4	8	16	14	16	19	21	21	18															

Updated to match(es) played on 12 December 2017. Source: Soccerway
A = Away; H = Home; W = Win; D = Draw; L = Loss

27 August 2017 1	San Martín (Argentina)	2–0	(Argentina) Patronato	San Juan, Argentina
11:05	F. Barcelo 3'; M. Gelabert 75'	Report		Stadium: Estadio Ingeniero Hilario Sánchez; Referee: Diego Abal (Argentina)

9 September 2017 2	Patronato (Argentina)	2–1	(Argentina) Argentinos Juniors	Paraná, Argentina
18:05	L. Márquez 37'; S. Ribas 74'	Report	B. Romero 12'	Stadium: Estadio Presbítero Bartolomé Grella; Referee: Juan Pompei (Argentina)

15 September 2017 3	Tigre (Argentina)	1–3	(Argentina) Patronato	Buenos Aires, Argentina
19:05	J. Blengio 45'	Report	M. Rivero 16', 90+4'; A. Balboa 59'	Stadium: Estadio José Dellagiovanna; Referee: Jorge Baliño (Argentina)

22 September 2017 4	Patronato (Argentina)	2–1	(Argentina) Atlético Tucumán	Paraná, Argentina
21:05	A. Balboa 9'; S. Ribas 54'	Report	G. Freitas 72'	Stadium: Estadio Presbítero Bartolomé Grella; Referee: Silvio Trucco (Argentina)

1 October 2017 5	Talleres (Argentina)	1–0	(Argentina) Patronato	Córdoba, Argentina
11:05	J. Arias 76'	Report		Stadium: Estadio Mario Alberto Kempes; Referee: Fernando Rapallini (Argentina)

15 October 2017 6	Patronato (Argentina)	0–2	(Argentina) Boca Juniors	Paraná, Argentina
20:05		Report	C. Pavón 50'; D. Benedetto 80'	Stadium: Estadio Presbítero Bartolomé Grella; Referee: Facundo Tello (Argentina)

28 October 2017 7	Independiente (Argentina)	1–1	(Argentina) Patronato	Avellaneda, Argentina
20:05	M. Meza 89'	Report	S. Ribas 34'	Stadium: Estadio Libertadores de América; Referee: Juan Pompei (Argentina)

6 November 2017 8	Patronato (Argentina)	0–0	(Argentina) Newell's Old Boys	Paraná, Argentina
19:05		Report		Stadium: Estadio Presbítero Bartolomé Grella; Referee: Nicolás Lamolina (Argentina)

20 November 2017 9	Gimnasia y Esgrima (Argentina)	2–0	(Argentina) Patronato	Buenos Aires, Argentina
17:00	N. Colazo 36'; N. Mazzola 51'	Report		Stadium: Estadio Juan Carmelo Zerillo; Referee: Diego Abal (Argentina)

25 November 2017 10	Patronato (Argentina)	2–3	(Argentina) Unión Santa Fe	Paraná, Argentina
17:00	S. Ribas 7', 60'	Report	D. Zabala 13'; F. Soldano 21'; L. Gamba 79' (pen.)	Stadium: Estadio Presbítero Bartolomé Grella; Referee: Jorge Baliño (Argentina)

1 December 2017 11	Huracán (Argentina)	1–1	(Argentina) Patronato	Buenos Aires, Argentina
21:30	F. Coniglio 78' (pen.)	Report	A. Balboa 45+1'	Stadium: Estadio Tomás Adolfo Ducó; Referee: Nicolás Lamolina (Argentina)

8 December 2017 12	Patronato (Argentina)	1–0	(Argentina) Olimpo	Paraná, Argentina
19:15	S. Ribas 78'	Report		Stadium: Estadio Presbítero Bartolomé Grella; Referee: Silvio Trucco (Argentina)

January 2018 13	Lanús (Argentina)	–	(Argentina) Patronato	Lanús, Argentina
		Report		Stadium: Estadio Ciudad de Lanús – Néstor Díaz Pérez

== Copa Argentina ==
Win Draw Loss

–
