= Agustín Bossio =

Argentine footballer

Personal information
- Full name: Agustín Bossio
- Date of birth: 15 November 1983 (age 42)
- Place of birth: Santa Fe, Argentina
- Height: 1.86 m (6 ft 1 in)
- Position: Goalkeeper

Youth career
- Colón

Senior career*
Years	Team	Apps	(Gls)
2007–2017	Patronato	4	(0)
2010	→ Ben Hur (loan)	13	(0)
2011–2012	→ Atlético Paraná (loan)	16	(0)
2017–2020	Atlético Paraná	2	(0)
- * Club domestic league appearances and goals

Agustín Bossio (born 15 November 1983) is an Argentine former professional footballer who played as a goalkeeper.

== Club career ==
Bossio was in Colón's youth team. In 2007, Bossio joined Primera B Nacional side Patronato. He didn't make a first-team appearance until 2013, prior to that he spent time out on loan. Ben Hur of Torneo Argentino A loaned Bossio in 2010, while Torneo Argentino B's Atlético Paraná temporarily signed him in 2011. He made a total of thirty appearances for the two clubs, notably suffering relegation with Ben Hur. He returned in 2012 and subsequently made his pro debut in February 2013. On 24 February, Bossio was subbed on for the final minutes versus Ferro Carril Oeste after a Sebastián Bertoli red card.

He featured in a further two fixtures for Patronato during 2012–13. In the following five seasons, Bossio made just one appearance whilst appearing as an unused substitute seventy-one times. On 31 August 2017, Bossio made a permanent move to rejoin Atlético Paraná. A serious knee injury forced Bossio into retirement, which he announced in April 2020.

== Coaching career ==
After retiring, Bossio took up concurrent coaching roles at Liga Santafesina clubs Náutico El Quillá and Juventud Unida de Candioti.

== Career statistics ==
Club statistics
Club	Season	League			Cup (Note: Includes the Copa Argentina)		League Cup		Continental		Other		Total	
Club	Season	Division	Apps	Goals	Apps	Goals	Apps	Goals	Apps	Goals	Apps	Goals	Apps	Goals
Patronato	2007–08	Torneo Argentino B	0	0	0	0	—		—		0	0	0	0
Patronato	2008–09	Torneo Argentino A	0	0	0	0	—		—		0	0	0	0
Patronato	2009–10	Torneo Argentino A	0	0	0	0	—		—		0	0	0	0
Patronato	2010–11	Primera B Nacional	0	0	0	0	—		—		0	0	0	0
Patronato	2011–12	Primera B Nacional	0	0	0	0	—		—		0	0	0	0
Patronato	2012–13	Primera B Nacional	3	0	0	0	—		—		0	0	3	0
Patronato	2013–14	Primera B Nacional	0	0	1	0	—		—		0	0	1	0
Patronato	2014	Primera B Nacional	0	0	0	0	—		—		0	0	0	0
Patronato	2015	Primera B Nacional	1	0	0	0	—		—		0	0	1	0
Patronato	2016	Primera División	0	0	0	0	—		—		0	0	0	0
Patronato	2016–17	Primera División	0	0	0	0	—		—		0	0	0	0
Patronato	Total		4	0	1	0	—		—		0	0	5	0
Ben Hur (loan)	2009–10	Torneo Argentino A	13	0	0	0	—		—		0	0	13	0
Atlético Paraná (loan)	2011–12	Torneo Argentino B	16	0	1	0	—		—		0	0	17	0
Atlético Paraná	2017–18	Torneo Federal A	2	0	0	0	—		—		0	0	2	0
Atlético Paraná	2018–19	Torneo Federal A	0	0	0	0	—		—		0	0	0	0
Atlético Paraná	2020	Torneo Regional Federal Amateur	0	0	0	0	—		—		0	0	0	0
Atlético Paraná	Total		0	0	0	0	—		—		0	0	0	0
Career total			35	0	2	0	—		—		0	0	37	0
