= Leonardo Morales (footballer, born 1991) =

Argentine footballer

Personal information
- Full name: Sandro Leonardo Morales
- Date of birth: 11 April 1991 (age 35)
- Place of birth: Villa Urquiza, Argentina
- Height: 1.80 m (5 ft 11 in)
- Positions: Centre-back; right-back

Team information
- Current team: Belgrano
- Number: 14

Senior career*
Years	Team	Apps	(Gls)
- Tabossi
- Viale FBC
2012–2015	Belgrano		
2016–2017	Atlético Paraná	38	(2)
2017–2018	Patronato	0	(0)
2018–2019	Santamarina	18	(0)
2019–2025	Gimnasia LP	176	(10)
2025–	Belgrano	34	(1)
- * Club domestic league appearances and goals as of 17:46, 9 July 2026 (UTC)

Sandro Leonardo Morales (born 11 April 1991) is an Argentine professional footballer who plays as a centre-back or right-back for Belgrano.

== Career ==
Morales had spells with Tabossi and Viale FBC, prior to joining Belgrano of Torneo Argentino B. He remained with Belgrano in Torneo Argentino B and subsequently Torneo Federal B between 2012 and 2015, making twenty appearances in his final season of 2015. 2016 saw Morales join Atlético Paraná in Primera B Nacional. He made his pro debut on 10 April during a tie with Independiente Rivadavia. In the following September, he scored his first goal for Atlético Paraná in a match with Nueva Chicago. Overall, Morales scored two goals in thirty-eight games for the club. In July 2017, Argentine Primera División side Patronato signed Morales.

He never featured for Patronato's first-team, leaving on 1 July 2018 to join Primera B Nacional's Santamarina.

== Career statistics ==
As of 9 September 2018.

Club statistics
Club	Season	League			Cup (Note: Includes the Copa Argentina)		League Cup		Continental		Other		Total	
Club	Season	Division	Apps	Goals	Apps	Goals	Apps	Goals	Apps	Goals	Apps	Goals	Apps	Goals
Atlético Paraná	2016	Primera B Nacional	3	0	0	0	—		—		0	0	3	0
Atlético Paraná	2016–17	Primera B Nacional	35	2	0	0	—		—		0	0	35	2
Atlético Paraná	Total		38	2	0	0	—		—		0	0	38	2
Patronato	2017–18	Primera División	0	0	0	0	—		—		0	0	0	0
Santamarina	2018–19	Primera B Nacional	1	0	0	0	—		—		0	0	1	0
Career total			39	2	0	0	—		—		0	0	39	2

== Honours ==
Belgrano

- Primera División: 2026 Apertura
