= Maximiliano Rueda =

Argentine footballer

Personal information
- Full name: Walter Maximiliano Rueda
- Date of birth: 2 December 1997 (age 28)
- Place of birth: Paraná, Entre Ríos, Argentina
- Height: 1.76 m (5 ft 9 in)
- Position: Midfielder

Team information
- Current team: Patronato

Youth career
- Instituto de Paraná
- Patronato

Senior career*
Years	Team	Apps	(Gls)
2016–2017	Belgrano de Paraná	23	(0)
2017	Atlético Neuquén	–	(–)
2018	Sportivo Urquiza	–	(–)
2018–2019	Atlético Paraná	19	(1)
2019–2023	Almagro	78	(8)
2023–2024	Cobresal	20	(1)
2024–2025	Atlanta	13	(1)
2025–	Patronato	49	(1)
- * Club domestic league appearances and goals as of 17:58, 23 March 2026 (UTC)

Walter Maximiliano Rueda (born 2 December 1997), known as Maximiliano Rueda or Maxi Rueda, is an Argentine footballer who plays as a midfielder for Patronato in the Primera Nacional.

== Club career ==
Born in Paraná, Entre Ríos, Argentina, Rueda was with both Instituto de Paraná and Patronato as a youth player. He started his career at minor categories of the Argentine football playing for Belgrano de Paraná, Atlético Neuquén, Sportivo Urquiza and Atlético Paraná.

In July 2019, he signed with Almagro. In August 2020, he renewed his contract until December 2022.

In 2023, he moved to Chile and joined Cobresal in the top division. They becoming the runner-up in the 2023 season and qualified to the 2024 Copa Libertadores.

In 2024, he returned to Argentina and signed with Atlanta in the Primera Nacional.

== Personal life ==
He uses his middle name, Maximiliano, to distinguish himself from his father of the same name, Walter.
