= Sebastián Bertoli =

Argentine footballer

Personal information
- Full name: Sebastián Hernán Bertoli
- Date of birth: 16 October 1977 (age 49)
- Place of birth: Paraná, Argentina
- Height: 1.85 m (6 ft 1 in)
- Position: Goalkeeper

Youth career
- 1988–1992: Universitario (PA)
- 1992–1994: Newell's Old Boys
- 1994: Racing Club

Senior career*
Years	Team	Apps	(Gls)
1997–1998	Unión Crespo		
1998–1999	Don Bosco		
1999–2001	Universitario (VLSM)		
2001–2003	Germinal		
2003	Atlético Paraná		
2003–2019	Patronato	486	(15)
- * Club domestic league appearances and goals

Sebastián Hernán Bertoli (born 16 October 1977) is an Argentine former professional footballer who played as a goalkeeper.

== Career ==
Bertoli had youth team spells with Universitario (PA), Newell's Old Boys and Racing Club. His senior career got underway in 1997 with Unión Crespo, which preceded moves to Don Bosco, Universitario (VLSM), Germinal and Atlético Paraná between 1998 and 2003. In 2003, Bertoli joined Torneo Argentino B side Patronato. He made one hundred and two appearances in his first four years, which ended with promotion to the 2008–09 Torneo Argentino A. Patronato were promoted again in 2009–10 and in 2015, during which period he featured two hundred and ninety times.

He also scored ten goals, with his first coming against Gimnasia y Esgrima on 18 May 2014; netting a 94th-minute penalty to draw 1–1. All ten goals were penalty-kicks. He made his top-flight debut on 6 February 2016 versus San Lorenzo, which was the first of forty-two appearances in his opening two seasons in the Primera División; scoring six penalties in the process, including the first versus River Plate in April 2016. Bertoli retired at the conclusion of the 2018–19 Primera División campaign. He played in five hundred and sixty-four matches for Patronato, with four hundred and eighty-six of those arriving in senior, league football.

== Honours ==
Patronato

- Torneo Argentino B: 2007–08
- Torneo Argentino A: 2009–10
