= 2019–20 Copa Premier Centroamericana =

Tournament details
- Dates: July 2019 – January 2020
- Teams: 8 (from 5 countries)

Final positions
- Champions: (Honduras) Real España (1st title)
- Runners-up: (Honduras) Olimpia

Tournament statistics
- Matches played: 17
- Top scorer(s): Rony Martínez: 5 goals

The 2019 Copa Premier Centroamericana will be the first edition of the Copa Premier Centroamericana.

== Invited teams ==
Association	Team
Costa Rica	Alajuelense
Costa Rica	Herediano
El Salvador	Alianza
Guatemala	Comunicaciones
Guatemala	Municipal
Honduras	Olimpia
Honduras	Real España
Panama	Árabe Unido

== Competition format ==
The competition will be divided into two groups of four. The top two will advance to the semifinals and the winners will compete for the cup.

== Group stage ==
=== Group A ===
Pos	Team	Pld	W	D	L	GF	GA	GD	Pts	Qualification or relegation
1	(El Salvador) Alianza	3	2	0	1	6	3	+3	6	Advance to Knockout stage
2	(Honduras) Real España	3	1	1	1	4	4	0	4	Advance to Knockout stage
3	(Costa Rica) Alajuelense	3	1	1	1	5	7	−2	4	
4	(Guatemala) Municipal	3	0	2	1	3	4	−1	2	

Updated to match(es) played on 14 July 2019. Source:
Rules for classification: 1) points; 2) goal difference; 3) number of goals scored.

10 July 2019	Alianza (El Salvador)	1–0	(Guatemala) Municipal	San Salvador, El Salvador
18:30	Olivera 50'			Stadium: Estadio Cuscatlán

10 July 2019	Real España (Honduras)	1–2	(Costa Rica) Alajuelense	San Pedro Sula, Honduras
20:30	Martínez 17'		Rojas 61'; López 89'	Stadium: Estadio General Francisco Morazán; Referee: Raúl Castro Zuniga (Honduras)

13 July 2019	Municipal (Guatemala)	2–2	(Costa Rica) Alajuelense	Guatemala City, Guatemala
15:00	Arce 31'; Guerra 33' (pen.)		Zavala 62'; Montenegro 90+6'	Stadium: Estadio El Trébol; Referee: Iván Barton (El Salvador)

13 July 2019	Alianza (El Salvador)	1–2	(Honduras) Real España	San Salvador, El Salvador
19:00	Peña 81' (pen.)		Martínez 22' (pen.); Vuelto 82'	Stadium: Estadio Cuscatlán; Referee: Benjamin Pineda Avila (Costa Rica)

17 July 2019	Alianza (El Salvador)	4–1	(Costa Rica) Alajuelense	San Salvador, El Salvador
20:00	Peñaranda 48', 90+1'; Cerén 57'; Óscar Rodríguez 90+4'		McDonald 38'	Stadium: Estadio Cuscatlán; Referee: Walter López Castellanos (Guatemala)

20 July 2019	Municipal (Guatemala)	1–1	(Honduras) Real España	Guatemala City, Guatemala
	José Mario Rosales 10'		Vuelto 42'

=== Group B ===
Pos	Team	Pld	W	D	L	GF	GA	GD	Pts	Qualification or relegation
1	(Guatemala) Comunicaciones	3	2	0	1	5	1	+4	6	Advance to Knockout stage
2	(Honduras) Olimpia	3	2	0	1	7	5	+2	6	Advance to Knockout stage
3	(Costa Rica) Herediano	3	2	0	1	3	3	0	6	
4	(Panama) Árabe Unido	3	0	0	3	2	8	−6	0	

Updated to match(es) played on 11 July 2019. Source:
Rules for classification: 1) points; 2) goal difference; 3) number of goals scored.

11 July 2019	Olimpia (Honduras)	3–0	(Costa Rica) Herediano	Tegucigalpa, Honduras
19:00	Garrido 51'; Benguché 71'; Lacayo 78'			Stadium: Estadio Tiburcio Carías Andino; Referee: Nelson Salgado (Honduras)

14 July 2019	Comunicaciones (Guatemala)	3–0	(Honduras) Olimpia	Guatemala City, Guatemala
11:00	Lombardi 6'; Herrera 54' (pen.), 58'			Stadium: Estadio Doroteo Guamuch Flores

14 July 2019	Herediano (Costa Rica)	2–0	(Panama) Árabe Unido	Heredia, Costa Rica
13:00	Rubio 45+1'; Galo 85'			Stadium: Estadio Eladio Rosabal Cordero; Referee: Walter López Castellanos (Guatemala)

17 July 2019	Árabe Unido (Panama)	2–4	(Honduras) Olimpia	Colón, Panama
18:00	Cox 6', 81'		Garrido 38'; Benguche 53'; Alvarado 61' (pen.); Róchez 90+2'	Stadium: Estadio Armando Dely Valdés

18 July 2019	Herediano (Costa Rica)	1–0	(Guatemala) Comunicaciones	Heredia, Costa Rica
15:00	Villalobos 51'			Stadium: Estadio Eladio Rosabal Cordero; Referee: Ismael Cornejo (El Salvador)

21 July 2019	Comunicaciones (Guatemala)	3–0	(Panama) Árabe Unido	Guatemala City, Guatemala
	Gordillo 47'; García 73'; Herrera 90'			Stadium: Estadio Doroteo Guamuch Flores; Referee: Oscar Macías (Mexico)

== Knockout stage ==
=== Semi-finals ===
==== 1st-leg ====
13 November 2019	Real España (Honduras)	2–0	(Guatemala) Comunicaciones	San Pedro Sula, Honduras
20:00	Martínez 7' (pen.), 55'			Stadium: Francisco Morazán

13 November 2019	Olimpia (Honduras)	1–0	(El Salvador) Alianza	Tegucigalpa, Honduras
6:00	Hernández 44'			Stadium: Tiburcio Carías Andino

==== 2nd-leg ====
17 November 2019	Comunicaciones (Guatemala)	2–1	(Honduras) Real España	Guatemala City, Guatemala
11:00	Chinchilla 45+2'; Montes 78' (o.g.)		Benavídez 24'	Stadium: Estadio Doroteo Guamuch Flores

8 January 2020	Alianza (El Salvador)	Not played	(Honduras) Olimpia	San Salvador, El Salvador
				Stadium: Cuscatlán

=== Final ===
16 January 2020	Real España (Honduras)	0–0	(Honduras) Olimpia	San Pedro Sula, Honduras
03:00				Stadium: Estadio Olimpico Metropolitano

22 January 2020	Olimpia (Honduras)	0-2	(Honduras) Real España	San Pedro Sula, Honduras
				Stadium: Estadio Olimpico Metropolitano

2019 Copa Premier Centroamericana winners

Real España
1st title

== Goalscorers ==
Rony Martínez: 5 goals
