= Alexander Hollman =

Argentine footballer (born 1993)

Personal information
- Full name: Miguel Alexander Hollman
- Date of birth: 10 June 1993 (age 33)
- Place of birth: María Grande, Argentina
- Height: 1.74 m (5 ft 8 1/2 in)
- Position: Defender

Team information
- Current team: Atlético María Grande

Youth career
- Atlético María Grande
- 2013–2014: Patronato

Senior career*
Years	Team	Apps	(Gls)
2014–2017	Patronato	1	(0)
2017	Atlético María Grande		
2017	Atlético Paraná	1	(0)
2018–	Atlético María Grande		
- * Club domestic league appearances and goals as of 13:53, 5 August 2018 (UTC)

Miguel Alexander Hollman (born 10 June 1993) is an Argentine footballer who plays as a defender for Atlético María Grande.

== Career ==
Hollman started in the youth system of local club Atlético María Grande, before joining Patronato in 2013. A year later, on 5 December 2014, Hollman made his professional league debut in a home loss versus Unión Santa Fe in Primera B Nacional. In the following years, he failed to feature for Patronato as the club won promotion to the Argentine Primera División in 2015; though was an unused substitute once in May 2016 for a goalless draw with Vélez Sarsfield. He departed Patronato in 2017 and subsequently had a short spell with ex-club and regional Liga de Paraná Campaña team Atlético María Grande.

On 31 July 2017, Atlético Paraná of Torneo Federal A signed Hollman. His first appearance arrived on 14 October against Sportivo Las Parejas. He left in 2017, which preceded a return to non-league outfit Atlético María Grande.

== Career statistics ==
As of 5 August 2018.

Club statistics
Club	Season	League			Cup (Note: Includes the Copa Argentina)		League Cup		Continental		Other		Total	
Club	Season	Division	Apps	Goals	Apps	Goals	Apps	Goals	Apps	Goals	Apps	Goals	Apps	Goals
Patronato	2014	Primera B Nacional	1	0	0	0	—		—		0	0	1	0
Patronato	2015	Primera B Nacional	0	0	0	0	—		—		0	0	0	0
Patronato	2016	Primera División	0	0	0	0	—		—		0	0	0	0
Patronato	2016–17	Primera División	0	0	0	0	—		—		0	0	0	0
Patronato	Total		1	0	0	0	—		—		0	0	1	0
Atlético Paraná	2017–18	Torneo Federal A	1	0	0	0	—		—		0	0	1	0
Career total			2	0	0	0	—		—		0	0	2	0
