= Adrián Balboa =

Uruguayan footballer (born 1994)

Personal information
- Full name: Adrián Martín Balboa Camacho
- Date of birth: 19 January 1994 (age 32)
- Place of birth: Montevideo, Uruguay
- Height: 1.86 m (6 ft 1 in)
- Position: Striker

Team information
- Current team: Banfield (on loan from Nizhny Novgorod)
- Number: 9

Youth career
- –2012: Cerrito

Senior career*
Years	Team	Apps	(Gls)
2012–2014	Cerrito	18	(6)
2013–2014	→ Panathinaikos (loan)	0	(0)
2014–2015	Danubio	11	(1)
2015–2017	Liverpool	6	(1)
2015–2016	→ Villa Teresa (loan)	15	(6)
2016–2017	→ Sarmiento (loan)	19	(4)
2017–2018	Patronato	24	(5)
2018–2023	Belgrano	41	(8)
2019	→ Deportes Antofagasta (loan)	13	(3)
2019–2020	→ Alianza Lima (loan)	20	(5)
2020–2021	→ Racing Santander (loan)	11	(1)
2022	→ Defensor Sporting (loan)	34	(10)
2023	Defensor Sporting	20	(8)
2023–2024	Deportivo Pereira	12	(4)
2024–2025	Unión Santa Fe	26	(5)
2025–2026	Racing Club	24	(5)
2026–	Nizhny Novgorod	16	(3)
2026–	→ Banfield (loan)	8	(2)
- * Club domestic league appearances and goals as of 17:51, 8 November 2026 (UTC)

Adrián Martín Balboa Camacho (born 19 January 1994) is a Uruguayan footballer who plays as a striker for Argentine Primera División club Banfield, on loan from Russian First League club Nizhny Novgorod.

== Career ==
Born in Montevideo, Balboa came from the youth divisions of Club Sportivo Cerrito, made his professional debut in the 0–1 loss against Villa Teresa on 24 November 2012. He scored his first goal for Cerrito in the Derby against Rentistas on 15 December 2012, it was the final goal in the 88 minute which lead the team win the match.

Balboa after a wonderful season with Cerrito playing 20 games and scoring 6 goals, he brought the attention of various European clubs being interested on him. The young attacker went to Greece, to be tested by Panathinaikos and after a week he signed a one-year loan with the club.

On 5 December, Balboa made his debut for Panathinaikos coming on as a sub in the 3–0 win against Iraklis Psachna.

In 2014, he returned to Uruguay to play for Danubio. He played in two other Uruguayan teams, Liverpool and Villa Teresa before moving to Argentina to join Sarmiento. After being relegated to Primera B Nacional on 2016-17 season, he joined Patronato.

On 30 January 2026, Balboa signed a one-and-a-half-year contract with Russian club Pari Nizhny Novgorod, with an option to extend for one more season.

== Career statistics ==
As of 17 May 2026

Appearances and goals by club, season and competition
Club	Season	League			Cup		Continental		Other		Total	
Club	Season	Division	Apps	Goals	Apps	Goals	Apps	Goals	Apps	Goals	Apps	Goals
Cerrito	2012–13	Uruguayan Segunda División	18	6	–		–		2 (Note: Appearances in promotion play-offs)	0	20	6
Panathinaikos (loan)	2013–14	Super League Greece	0	0	1	0	–		–		1	0
Danubio	2014–15	Liga AUF Uruguaya	11	1	–		0	0	–		11	1
Liverpool	2015–16	Liga AUF Uruguaya	6	1	–		–		–		6	1
Villa Teresa (loan)	2015–16	Liga AUF Uruguaya	15	6	–		–		–		15	6
Sarmiento (loan)	2016–17	AFA Liga Profesional de Fútbol	19	4	0	0	–		–		19	4
Patronato	2017–18	AFA Liga Profesional de Fútbol	24	5	–		–		–		24	5
Belgrano	2018–19	AFA Liga Profesional de Fútbol	12	1	–		–		–		12	1
Belgrano	2021	Primera Nacional	29	8	–		–		–		29	8
Belgrano	Totals		41	9	0	0	0	0	0	0	41	9
Deportes Antofagasta (loan)	2019	Liga de Primera	13	3	0	0	2 (Note: Appearances in Copa Sudamericana)	0	–		15	3
Alianza Lima (loan)	2019	Liga 1	14	5	–		–		4 (Note: Appearances in playoffs)	0	18	5
Alianza Lima (loan)	2020	Liga 1	6	0	–		2 (Note: Appearances in Copa Libertadores)	0	–		8	0
Alianza Lima (loan)	Totals		20	5	0	0	2	0	4	0	26	5
Racing Santander (loan)	2020–21	Segunda División B	11	1	1	0	–		–		12	1
Defensor Sporting (loan)	2022	Liga AUF Uruguaya	34	10	4	1	–		–		38	11
Defensor Sporting	2023	Liga AUF Uruguaya	20	8	–		1	0	–		21	8
Deportivo Pereira	2023	Liga DIMAYOR	12	4	3	1	2	0	–		17	5
Unión Santa Fe	2024	AFA Liga Profesional de Fútbol	26	5	1	0	–		13 (Note: Appearances in Copa de la Liga Profesional)	3	40	8
Racing Club	2025	AFA Liga Profesional de Fútbol	24	5	4	1	10	1	2 (Note: One appearance in playoff Apertura, one appearance in playoff Clausura)	0	40	7
Pari Nizhny Novgorod	2025–26	Russian Premier League	12	3	–		–		–		12	3
Career totals			306	76	14	3	17	1	21	3	358	83
