= 2025 Racing Club de Avellaneda season =

Racing Club de Avellaneda
2025 season
- President: Diego Milito
- Manager: Gustavo Costas
- Stadium: El Cilindro
- Torneo Apertura: Round of 16
- Torneo Clausura: Runners-up
- Copa Argentina: Quarter-finals
- Copa Libertadores: Semi-finals
- Recopa Sudamericana: Champions (1st title)
- Average home league attendance: 50,180
Home colours	Away colours	Third colours

The 2025 season was the 122nd for Racing Club de Avellaneda and their 11th consecutive season in the Primera División. The club also participated in the Copa Argentina, Copa Libertadores, and Recopa Sudamericana.

== Squad ==
=== Current squad ===
As of 28 January 2025.

Note: Flags indicate national team as defined under FIFA eligibility rules; some limited exceptions apply. Players may hold more than one non-FIFA nationality.

No.	Pos.	Nation	Player
2	DF	ARG	Agustín García Basso
3	DF	ARG	Marco Di Cesare
5	MF	ARG	Juan Nardoni
7	FW	ARG	Maximiliano Salas
9	FW	ARG	Adrián Martínez
10	FW	ARG	Luciano Vietto
11	MF	ARG	Matías Zaracho
13	DF	ARG	Santiago Sosa
14	MF	ARG	Adrián Fernández (on loan from San Telmo)
15	DF	URU	Gastón Martirena
16	MF	URU	Martín Barrios
19	MF	ARG	Ignacio Rodríguez
20	DF	ARG	Germán Conti
21	GK	CHI	Gabriel Arias (captain)
23	DF	ARG	Nazareno Colombo

No.	Pos.	Nation	Player
25	GK	ARG	Facundo Cambeses
26	DF	PAR	Richard Sánchez
27	DF	ARG	Gabriel Rojas
28	FW	ARG	Santiago Solari
32	MF	ARG	Agustín Almendra
34	DF	ARG	Facundo Mura
35	DF	ARG	Santiago Quirós
36	MF	ARG	Bruno Zuculini
41	FW	ARG	Ramiro Degregorio
43	DF	ARG	Gonzalo Escudero
49	MF	ARG	David González
59	DF	ARG	Fabián Sánchez
77	FW	URU	Adrián Balboa
—	GK	ARG	Gastón Gómez

=== Transfers In ===
Pos.	Player	Transferred from	Fee	Date	Source
FW	(Uruguay) Adrián Balboa	(Argentina) Unión de Santa Fe	€776,000	17 January 2025	
MF	(Argentina) Matías Zaracho	(Brazil) Atlético Mineiro	€1,700,000	17 January 2025	
DF	(Argentina) Santiago Sosa	(United States) Atlanta United	Undisclosed	20 January 2025	
MF	(Argentina) Adrian Fernández	(Argentina) San Telmo	Loan	31 January 2025	
MF	(Paraguay) Richard Sánchez	(Mexico) América	Undisclosed	12 March 2025	
MF	(Argentina) Alan Forneris	(Argentina) Colón	Undisclosed	25 June 2025	
MF	(Colombia) Duván Vergara	(Colombia) América de Cali	Undisclosed	25 June 2025	
MF	(Argentina) Tomás Conechny	(Spain) Alavés	Undisclosed	11 July 2025	
DF	(Argentina) Marcos Rojo	(Argentina) Boca Juniors	Free	10 August 2025	

=== Transfers Out ===
Pos.	Player	Transferred to	Fee	Date	Source
FW	(Argentina) Nicolás Reniero	(Spain) Lugo	Free	8 January 2025	
FW	(Colombia) Roger Martínez	(Saudi Arabia) Al Taawoun	Free	14 January 2025	
MF	(Peru) Catriel Cabellos	(Peru) Sporting Cristal	Undisclosed	16 January 2025	
GK	(Argentina) Gastón Gómez	(Chile) Deportes Concepción	Loan	13 June 2025	
FW	(Argentina) Maximiliano Salas	(Argentina) River Plate	€8,000,000	11 July 2025	

== Exhibition matches ==
18 January 2025 Friendly	Colo Colo (Chile)	0–3	(Argentina) Racing	Macul
			Sosa 50'; Solari 78', 90'	Stadium: Estadio Monumental

28 June 2025 Friendly	Olimpia (Paraguay)	1–4	(Argentina) Racing	Asunción, Paraguay
16:00 UTC−3	Ferreira 66'		Fernández 42'; Barreto 46' (o.g.); Zuculini 83'; Degregorio 90+1'	Stadium: Estadio Defensores del Chaco

== Competitions ==
=== Overall record ===
Competition	First match	Last match	Starting round	Final position	Record							
Competition	First match	Last match	Starting round	Final position	Pld	W	D	L	GF	GA	GD	Win %
Torneo Apertura	24 January 2025	10 May 2025	Matchday 1	Round of 16	17	9	1	7	26	17	+9	52.94
Torneo Clausura	13 July 2025	13 December 2025	Matchday 1	Runners-up	20	9	6	5	21	16	+5	45.00
Copa Argentina	23 March 2025	2 October 2025	Round of 64	Quarter-finals	4	3	0	1	8	2	+6	75.00
Copa Libertadores	1 April 2025	29 October 2025	Group stage	Semi-finals	12	7	2	3	19	6	+13	58.33
Recopa Sudamericana	20 February 2025	27 February 2025	Final	Winners	2	2	0	0	4	0	+4	100.00
Total					55	30	9	16	78	41	+37	54.55

Last updated: 13 December 2025
Source: Competitions

=== Primera División ===
==== Torneo Apertura ====
===== League table =====
Pos	Team	Pld	W	D	L	GF	GA	GD	Pts	Qualification
1	Argentinos Juniors	16	9	6	1	24	9	+15	33	Advance to round of 16
2	Boca Juniors	16	10	3	3	24	11	+13	33	Advance to round of 16
3	Racing	16	9	1	6	26	16	+10	28	Advance to round of 16
4	Huracán	16	7	6	3	19	12	+7	27	Advance to round of 16
5	Tigre	16	8	3	5	18	12	+6	27	Advance to round of 16

Source: AFA

===== Results by round =====
Round	1
Ground	A
Result	
Position	

A = Away; H = Home; W = Win; D = Draw; L = Loss

===== Matches =====
24 January 2025 1	Barracas Central	1–3	Racing	Avellaneda
17:00 UTC−3	Bruera 21'	Report	Vietto 30'; Martínez 74'; Balboa 90+2'	Stadium: Estadio Julio Humberto Grondona

30 January 2025 2	Racing	4–0	Belgrano	Avellaneda
19:15 UTC−3	Martínez 20', 68'; Vietto 62'; Balboa 82'	Report		Stadium: El Cilindro

3 February 2025 3	Estudiantes	2–0	Racing	La Plata
19:15 UTC−3	Ascacíbar 34'; Neves 58'	Report		Stadium: Estadio Jorge Luis Hirschi

8 February 2025 4	Racing	2–0	Boca Juniors	Avellaneda
22:15 UTC−3	Vietto 15'; Martínez 86'	Report		Stadium: El Cilindro; Referee: Yael Falcón Pérez

11 February 2025 5	Tigre	1–0	Racing	Victoria
22:15 UTC−3	Saralegui 4'	Report		Stadium: Estadio José Dellagiovanna

15 February 2025 6	Racing	2–3	Argentinos Juniors	Avellaneda
21:30 UTC−3	Lescano 22'; Molina 28'; Prieto 47'	Report	Barrios 82'; Di Cesare 88'	Stadium: El Cilindro

3 March 2025 7	San Lorenzo	3–2	Racing	Buenos Aires
19:00 UTC−3	Braida 2', 86'; Peralta 90+1'		Mura 30'; Balboa 50'	Stadium: Estadio Pedro Bidegain; Attendance: 46 792

8 March 2025 8	Racing	0–1	Huracán	Avellaneda
19:15 UTC−3			Ramírez 25'	Stadium: El Cilindro

16 March 2025 9	Independiente	1–1	Racing	Avellaneda
16:00 UTC−3	Angulo 79'		Martirena 21'	Stadium: Estadio Libertadores de América

16 March 2025 10	Unión de Santa Fe	0–1	Racing	Santa Fe
21:00 UTC−3			Martínez 59'	Stadium: Estadio 15 de Abril

27 March 2025 11	Independiente Rivadavia	2–1	Racing	Mendoza
21:00 UTC−3	Barbieri 69', 79'		Nardoni 25'	Stadium: Estadio Bautista Gargantini

6 April 2025 12	Racing	4–1	Banfield	Avellaneda
20:15 UTC−3	Martínez 42', 47', 55'; Solari 76'		Alaniz 90+1'	Stadium: El Cilindro

14 April 2025 13	Aldosivi	0–2	Racing	Mar del Plata
15:30 UTC−3		Report	Martínez 13' (pen.); Solari 35'	Stadium: Estadio José María Minella

18 April 2025 14	Racing	1–0	Central Córdoba	Avellaneda
19:15 UTC−3	Zuculini 45'	Report		Stadium: El Cilindro

28 April 2025 15	Defensa y Justicia	1–2	Racing	Gobernador Costa
19:30 UTC−3	González 54'	Report	Salas 72'; Martirena 87'	Stadium: Estadio Norberto "Tito" Tomaghello

2 May 2025 16	Racing	1–0	Newell's Old Boys	Avellaneda
15:30 UTC−3	Salcedo 88' (o.g.)	Report		Stadium: El Cilindro

===== Final stages =====
10 May 2025 Round of 16	Racing	0–1	Platense	Avellaneda
18:45		Report	Orsini 83'	Stadium: El Cilindro; Referee: Darío Herrera

==== Torneo Clausura ====
===== League table =====
Pos	Team	Pld	W	D	L	GF	GA	GD	Pts	Qualification
1	Boca Juniors	16	8	5	3	28	12	+16	29	Advance to round of 16
2	Unión	16	6	7	3	20	13	+7	25	Advance to round of 16
3	Racing	16	7	4	5	16	13	+3	25	Advance to round of 16
4	Central Córdoba (SdE)	16	5	9	2	17	11	+6	24	Advance to round of 16
5	Argentinos Juniors	16	7	3	6	18	13	+5	24	Advance to round of 16

Source: AFA

===== Matches =====
12 July 2025 1	Racing	0–1	Barracas Central	Avellaneda
20:45 UTC−3		Report	Insúa 90+13' (pen.)	Stadium: El Cilindro

20 July 2025 2	Belgrano	0–1	Racing	Córdoba
19:00 UTC−3		Report	Vergara 51'	Stadium: El Gigante de Alberdi

26 July 2025 3	Racing	0–1	Estudiantes	Avellaneda
21:15 UTC−3		Report	Carrillo 55'	Stadium: El Cilindro

9 August 2025 4	Boca Juniors	1–1	Racing	Buenos Aires
16:30 UTC−3	Giménez 82'	Report	Solari 75'	Stadium: La Bombonera; Referee: Nicolás Ramírez

15 August 2025 5	Racing	1–2	Tigre	Avellaneda
21:00 UTC−3	Balboa 43'	Report	Martínez 90' (pen.); Russo 90+3'	Stadium: El Cilindro

24 August 2025 6	Argentinos Juniors	4–1	Racing	Buenos Aires
16:15 UTC−3	Lescano 28'; López 51'; Giménez 60'; Oroz 70'	Report	Conechny 26'	Stadium: Diego Armando Maradona

31 August 2025 7	Racing	2–3	Unión	Avellaneda
21:15 UTC−3	Martínez 23'; Mura 90+3'	Report	Estigarribia 29'; Tarragona 42'; Solari 83'	Stadium: El Cilindro

12 September 2025 8	Racing	2–0	San Lorenzo	Avellaneda
19:00 UTC−3	Colombo 37'; Solari 58'	Report		Stadium: El Cilindro

19 September 2025 9	Huracán	0–2	Racing	Buenos Aires
19:00 UTC−3		Report	Vergara 23'; Zaracho 90+2'	Stadium: Estadio Tomás Adolfo Ducó

28 September 2025 10	Racing	0–0	Independiente	Avellaneda
15:15 UTC−3		Report		Stadium: El Cilindro

6 October 2025 11	Racing	0–0	Independiente Rivadavia	Avellaneda
21:00 UTC−3		Report		Stadium: El Cilindro

11 October 2025 12	Banfield	1–3	Racing	Banfield
18:00 UTC−3	Sepúlveda 90+3'	Report	Zuculini 26', 60'; Balboa 90+1'	Stadium: Estadio Florencio Sola

17 October 2025 13	Racing	1–0	Aldosivi	Avellaneda
19:00 UTC−3	Vietto 41' (pen.)	Report		Stadium: El Cilindro

3 November 2025 14	Central Córdoba	0–0	Racing	Santiago del Estero
18:00 UTC−3		Report		Stadium: Estadio Único Madre de Ciudades

8 November 2025 15	Racing	1–0	Defensa y Justicia	Avellaneda
16:00 UTC−3	Vergara 41'	Report		Stadium: El Cilindro

16 November 2025 16	Newell's Old Boys	0–1	Racing	Rosario
19:15 UTC−3		Report	Conechny 90+2'	Stadium: Estadio Marcelo Bielsa

===== Final stages =====
24 November 2025 Round of 16	Racing	3–2	River Plate	Avellaneda
19:30	Solari 3'; Martínez Quarta 72' (o.g.); Martirena 90+2'	Report	Subiabre 61'; Quintero 63'	Stadium: El Cilindro; Referee: Facundo Tello

1 December 2025 Quarter-finals	Racing	0–0 (a.e.t.) (4–2 p)	Tigre	Avellaneda
21:30		Report		Stadium: El Cilindro; Referee: Andrés Merlos
	Penalties
	Martínez (penalty scored); Fernández (penalty scored); Rojas (penalty scored); García Basso (penalty scored)		(penalty missed) Cardona; (penalty scored) Sosa; (penalty missed) Laso; (penalty scored) López

7 December 2025 Semi-finals	Boca Juniors	0–1	Racing	Buenos Aires
19:00		Report	Martínez 74'	Stadium: La Bombonera; Referee: Darío Herrera

13 December 2025 Final	Racing	1–1 (a.e.t.) (4–5 p)	Estudiantes	Santiago del Estero
21:00	Martínez 80'	Report	Carrillo 90+2'	Stadium: Estadio Único Madre de Ciudades; Referee: Nicolás Ramírez
	Penalties
	Martínez (penalty scored); Vietto (penalty scored); García Basso (penalty scored); Martirena (penalty missed); Sosa (penalty scored); Pardo (penalty missed)		(penalty scored) Sosa; (penalty missed) Cetré; (penalty scored) Alario; (penalty scored) Tobio Burgos; (penalty scored) Meza; (penalty scored) Rodríguez

=== Copa Argentina ===
23 March 2025 Round of 64	Racing	2–0	Santamarina	Lanús
17:00 UTC−3	Mura 44'; Salas 55'	Report		Stadium: Estadio Ciudad de Lanús; Referee: Sebastián Zunino

2 July 2025 Round of 32	Racing	3–1	San Martín (SJ)	La Punta
18:45	Martínez 28', 78'; Balboa 73'	Report	Tijanovich 19'	Stadium: Estadio Juan Gilberto Funes; Referee: Fernando Echenique

3 August 2025 Round of 16	Racing	3–0	Deportivo Riestra	Lanús
16:00	Vergara 10' (pen.); Barbieri 26' (o.g.); Mura 32'	Report		Stadium: Ciudad de Lanús – Néstor Díaz Pérez; Referee: Nazareno Arasa

2 October 2025 Quarter-finals	Racing	0–1	River Plate	Rosario
18:00		Report	Salas 5'	Stadium: Gigante de Arroyito; Referee: Hernán Mastrángelo

=== Copa Libertadores ===
==== Group Stage ====
The draw for the group stage was held on March 17, 2025.

Pos	Team	Pld	W	D	L	GF	GA	GD	Pts	Qualification	RAC	FOR	BUC	CLC
1	(Argentina) Racing	6	4	1	1	14	3	+11	13	Advance to round of 16	—	1–0	1–2	4–0
2	(Brazil) Fortaleza	6	2	2	2	8	5	+3	8	Advance to round of 16	0–3	—	0–0	4–0
3	(Colombia) Atlético Bucaramanga	6	1	3	2	6	10	−4	6	Transfer to Copa Sudamericana	0–4	1–1	—	3–3
4	(Chile) Colo-Colo	6	1	2	3	5	15	−10	5		1–1	0–3 (Note: The Colo-Colo v Fortaleza match was suspended at 0–0 in the 68th minute of play after Colo-Colo fans invaded the pitch following the passing of two fellow supporters in an incident prior to the start of the match. After a one-hour wait, CONMEBOL announced the abandonment of the match and referred the matter to its Disciplinary Commission, which subsequently awarded Fortaleza a 3–0 win.)	1–0	—

Source: CONMEBOL
Notes:

1 April 2025 1	Fortaleza (Brazil)	0–3	(Argentina) Racing	Fortaleza, Brazil
21:30 UTC−3		Report	Salas 26'; Almendra 48'; Sosa 84'	Stadium: Castelão; Attendance: 40,413; Referee: Juan Gabriel Benítez (Paraguay)

10 April 2025 2	Racing (Argentina)	1–2	(Colombia) Atlético Bucaramanga	Avellaneda, Argentina
19:00 UTC−3	Barrios 90+2'	Report	Pons 54'; Sambueza 64'	Stadium: El Cilindro; Attendance: 0 (Note: Racing played their home match against Atlético Bucaramanga behind closed doors as they were punished for the use of pyrotechnics by their fans in their 2024 Copa Sudamericana semi-final match against Corinthians.); Referee: Andrés Matonte (Uruguay)

22 April 2025 3	Colo-Colo (Chile)	1–1	(Argentina) Racing	Santiago, Chile
20:30 UTC−4	Cepeda 9'	Report	Barrios 86'	Stadium: Estadio Monumental David Arellano; Attendance: 0 (Note: Colo-Colo will play their home matches against Racing and Atlético Bucaramanga behind closed doors as they were punished for the incidents in their match against Fortaleza.); Referee: Juan Gabriel Benítez (Paraguay)

6 May 2025 4	Atlético Bucaramanga (Colombia)	0–4	(Argentina) Racing	Bucaramanga, Colombia
17:00 UTC−5		Report	Martínez 4'; Solari 56'; Sosa 69'; Barrios 90+4'	Stadium: Estadio Américo Montanini; Referee: Augusto Aragón

14 May 2025 5	Racing (Argentina)	4–0	(Chile) Colo-Colo	Avellaneda, Argentina
21:30 UTC−3	Martínez 36', 45+1'; Solari 51'; Balboa 81'	Report		Stadium: El Cilindro; Referee: Gustavo Tejera (Uruguay)

29 May 2025 6	Racing (Argentina)	1–0	(Brazil) Fortaleza	Avellaneda, Argentina
21:30 UTC−3	Martínez 90+4'	Report		Stadium: El Cilindro; Referee: Alexis Herrera (Venezuela)

==== Final stages ====
The draw for the round of 16 was held on 2 June 2025, 12:00 PYT (UTC−3) at the CONMEBOL headquarters in Luque, Paraguay.

==== Round of 16 ====
12 August 2025 First leg	Peñarol (Uruguay)	1–0	(Argentina) Racing	Montevideo, Uruguay
21:30 UTC−3	Terans 78'	Report		Stadium: Estadio Campeón del Siglo; Attendance: 35,570; Referee: Raphael Claus (Brazil)

19 August 2025 Second leg	Racing (Argentina)	3–1 (3–2 agg.)	(Uruguay) Peñarol	Avellaneda, Argentina
21:30 UTC−3	Martínez 7', 83' (pen.); Pardo 90+4'	Report	Herrera 15'	Stadium: El Cilindro; Referee: Wilmar Roldán (Colombia)

==== Quarter-finals ====
16 September 2025 First leg	Vélez Sarsfield (Argentina)	0–1	(Argentina) Racing	Buenos Aires, Argentina
19:00 UTC−3		Report	Martínez 53'	Stadium: Estadio José Amalfitani; Referee: Wilton Sampaio (Brazil)

23 September 2025 Second leg	Racing (Argentina)	1–0 (2–0 agg.)	(Argentina) Vélez Sarsfield	Avellaneda, Argentina
19:00 UTC−3	Solari 82'			Stadium: El Cilindro; Referee: Esteban Ostojich (Uruguay)

==== Semi-finals ====
22 October 2025 First leg	Flamengo (Brazil)	1–0	(Argentina) Racing	Rio de Janeiro, Brazil
21:30 UTC−3	Carrascal 88'	Report		Stadium: Estádio do Maracanã; Attendance: 71,738; Referee: Jesús Valenzuela (Venezuela)

29 October 2025 Second leg	Racing (Argentina)	0–0 (0–1 agg.)	(Brazil) Flamengo	Avellaneda, Argentina
21:30 UTC−3		Report		Stadium: El Cilindro; Referee: Piero Maza (Chile)

=== Recopa Sudamericana ===
20 February 2025 First leg	Racing (Argentina)	2–0	(Brazil) Botafogo	Avellaneda, Argentina
21:30 UTC−3	Vietto 31' (pen.); Martínez 63'	Report		Stadium: Estadio Presidente Perón; Referee: Felipe González (Chile)

27 February 2025 Second leg	Botafogo (Brazil)	0–2 (0–4 agg.)	(Argentina) Racing	Rio de Janeiro, Brazil
21:30 UTC−3		Report	Zaracho 50'; Zuculini 69'	Stadium: Estádio Olímpico Nilton Santos; Referee: Jesús Valenzuela (Venezuela)
