= Yamil Silva =

Argentine footballer

Personal information
- Full name: Yamil Silva
- Date of birth: 30 December 1996 (age 29)
- Place of birth: Paraná, Argentina
- Height: 1.78 m (5 ft 10 in)
- Position: Midfielder

Team information
- Current team: Patronato
- Number: 27

Senior career*
Years	Team	Apps	(Gls)
2016–	Patronato	0	(0)
- * Club domestic league appearances and goals as of 00:19, 29 May 2018 (UTC)

Yamil Silva (born 30 December 1996) is an Argentine professional football player who plays as a midfielder for Argentine Primera División side Patronato.

== Career ==
Silva was promoted into the first-team squad of Patronato in the 2016–17 Argentine Primera División season, serving as an unused substitute six times throughout the campaign. On 1 June 2017, Silva made his professional debut in the Copa Argentina against Deportivo Morón of Primera B Metropolitana.

== Career statistics ==
As of 29 May 2018.

Club statistics
Club	Season	League			Cup (Note: Includes the Copa Argentina)		League Cup		Continental		Other		Total	
Club	Season	Division	Apps	Goals	Apps	Goals	Apps	Goals	Apps	Goals	Apps	Goals	Apps	Goals
Patronato	2016–17	Primera División	0	0	1	0	—		—		0	0	1	0
Patronato	2017–18	Primera División	0	0	0	0	—		—		0	0	0	0
Career total			0	0	1	0	—		—		0	0	1	0
