= Tomás Conechny =

Argentine footballer (born 1998)

Personal information
- Full name: José Tomás Conechny
- Date of birth: 30 March 1998 (age 28)
- Place of birth: Comodoro Rivadavia, Argentina
- Height: 1.70 m (5 ft 7 in)
- Positions: Winger; attacking midfielder

Team information
- Current team: Racing Club
- Number: 17

Youth career
- 2009–2014: CAI
- 2014–2016: San Lorenzo

Senior career*
Years	Team	Apps	(Gls)
2016–2019	San Lorenzo	14	(0)
2018–2019	→ Portland Timbers (loan)	12	(1)
2018–2019	→ Portland Timbers 2 (loan)	3	(1)
2019–2021	Portland Timbers	16	(0)
2019–2020	Portland Timbers 2	3	(1)
2021	Deportivo Maldonado	25	(1)
2021–2023	Almagro	37	(4)
2023–2024	Godoy Cruz	56	(14)
2024–2025	Alavés	22	(1)
2025–	Racing Club	47	(6)

International career
2015	Argentina U17	10	(6)
2017	Argentina U20	11	(1)
- * Club domestic league appearances and goals as of 18:07, 8 November 2026 (UTC)

José Tomás Conechny (born 30 March 1998) is an Argentine professional footballer who plays as a winger or an attacking midfielder for Racing Club.

== Club career ==
=== San Lorenzo ===
Born in Comodoro Rivadavia, Conechny began his career with local side Comisión de Actividades Infantiles before travelling more than 1500 kilometers across the country to join San Lorenzo in 2014, at the age of 16. Earlier in the year, he had been invited by Premier League club Liverpool to attend a trial. He made his debut for San Lorenzo on 16 October 2016, coming on as a second-half substitute for Fernando Belluschi in a 3–1 win over Arsenal de Sarandí. He made 14 appearances for the club over the course of the next two years before joining MLS side Portland Timbers on loan in 2018.

==== Loan to Portland Timbers ====
On 17 July 2018, Conechny signed for Portland Timbers on a season-long loan, claiming an international roster slot, with the club retaining the option of purchase. He struggled for game time in his debut season with the club, however, playing just 72 minutes across four appearances but his loan was extended for another season at the end of the campaign.

=== Portland Timbers ===
On 22 July 2019, Conechny made his move to Portland permanent.

On 10 March 2021, Conechny and Portland mutually agreed to terminate his contract.

=== Deportivo Maldonado ===
On 2 April 2021, Conechny signed with Uruguayan Primera División side Deportivo Maldonado.

=== Almagro ===
At the end of December 2021, Conechny signed a deal with Club Almagro.

=== Godoy Cruz ===
On 14 December 2022, Godoy Cruz announced the signing of Conechny, after acquiring 80% of his rights from Almagro.

=== Alavés ===
On 5 July 2024, Conechny signed a four-year contract with La Liga side Deportivo Alavés.

=== Racing Club ===
On 12 July 2025, Conechny returned to Argentina after a year in Spain to join Racing Club.

== International career ==
=== Argentina national youth teams ===
Conechny is an Argentine youth international and has amassed over 20 appearances across various youth levels. He represented Argentina at the 2015 South American Under-17 Football Championship in Paraguay and at the 2015 FIFA U-17 World Cup in Chile. During the former tournament, and on the day of his 17th birthday, he suffered multiple minor injuries when he fell 10 feet from his hotel window after celebrating scoring a goal while playing FIFA on his PlayStation. He was Argentina's top goalscorer at the tournament with five goals, but missed the final due to the injuries he sustained during the accident. He recovered to play in the U-17 World Cup later that year and scored Argentina's lone goal during that tournament.

In December 2016, he was called up to the Argentina U20 side for the 2017 South American Youth Football Championship. He scored once during the group stages before Argentina ended the tournament in fourth position, thereby qualifying for the 2017 FIFA U-20 World Cup. Conechny was included in the squad for the latter tournament alongside San Lorenzo teammate Marcos Senesi. He featured in each of Argentina's three matches, though the nation failed to progress from the group-stage.

== Personal life ==
Born and raised in Argentina, Conechny is of Polish descent.

== Career statistics ==
=== Club ===
As of 3 March 2026

Appearances and goals by club, season and competition
Club	Season	League			Cup (Note: Includes Copa Argentina, U.S. Open Cup, Copa del Rey)		League Cup (Note: Includes Copa de la Liga Profesional)		Continental (Note: Includes Copa Libertadores)		Total	
Club	Season	Division	Apps	Goals	Apps	Goals	Apps	Goals	Apps	Goals	Apps	Goals
San Lorenzo	2016–17	Primera División	7	0	0	0	—		—		7	0
San Lorenzo	2017–18	Primera División	7	0	1	0	—		—		8	0
San Lorenzo	Total		14	0	1	0	0	0	0	0	15	0
Portland Timbers (loan)	2018	MLS	4	0	0	0	—		—		4	0
Portland Timbers (loan)	2019	MLS	8	0	0	0	—		—		8	0
Portland Timbers (loan)	Total		12	0	0	0	0	0	0	0	12	0
Portland Timbers 2 (loan)	2018	USL Championship	2	1	—		—		—		2	1
Portland Timbers 2 (loan)	2019	USL Championship	2	0	—		—		—		2	0
Portland Timbers 2 (loan)	Total		4	1	0	0	0	0	0	0	4	1
Portland Timbers	2019	MLS	8	1	3	0	—		—		11	1
Portland Timbers	2020	MLS	8	0	0	0	—		—		8	0
Portland Timbers	Total		16	1	3	0	0	0	0	0	19	1
Portland Timbers 2	2020	USL Championship	1	1	—		—		—		1	1
Deportivo Maldonado	2021	Uruguayan Primera División	25	1	0	0	—		—		25	1
Almagro	2022	Primera División	37	4	0	0	—		—		37	4
Godoy Cruz	2023	Primera División	24	6	1	0	15	3	—		40	9
Godoy Cruz	2024	Primera División	3	0	1	0	14	5	2	0	20	5
Godoy Cruz	Total		27	6	2	0	0	0	2	0	60	14
Deportivo Alavés	2024–25	La Liga	22	1	2	0	—		—		24	2
Racing Club	2025	Primera División	16	2	2	0	—		6	0	24	2
Racing Club	2026	Primera División	7	3	0	0	—		0	0	7	3
Racing Club	Total		23	5	2	0	0	0	6	0	31	5
Career total			181	20	10	0	29	8	8	0	228	28
