= Alejandro Almada =

Argentine footballer (born 1990)

Personal information
- Date of birth: 5 January 1990 (age 36)
- Place of birth: Paraná, Argentina
- Height: 1.78 m (5 ft 10 in)
- Position: Midfielder

Team information
- Current team: Atlético Paraná

Senior career*
Years	Team	Apps	(Gls)
2008–2010	Salto Grande		
2010–2011	Colegiales	14	(1)
2011	Deportivo Riestra	4	(0)
2011–2012	Sportivo Las Heras	20	(2)
2012–2017	Patronato	46	(0)
2015–2016	→ Libertad (loan)	10	(0)
2016	→ Santa María de Oro (loan)	9	(0)
2017–2018	San Jorge	20	(0)
2020–	Atlético Paraná	3	(0)
- * Club domestic league appearances and goals as of 17:50, 26 June 2020 (UTC)

Alejandro Almada (born 5 January 1990) is an Argentine professional footballer who plays as a midfielder for Atlético Paraná.

== Career ==
Almada's career started in 2008 with Salto Grande in Torneo Argentino C. Two years later, in 2010, Colegiales of Torneo Argentino B signed Almada. He scored once in fourteen appearances during 2010–11, before departing after the season to play in Primera D for Deportivo Riestra. However, he left soon after following just four appearances. A season-long spell with Sportivo Las Heras arrived, before Almada joined Primera B Nacional side Patronato in August 2012. He made his professional career debut on 20 August during a 3–5 home defeat versus Crucero del Norte.

In total, he made thirty-six appearances in his opening two campaigns with Patronato. He subsequently only featured thirteen times in the next four campaigns, with most of his time spent out on loan to Torneo Federal B clubs; in 2015 and 2016 to Libertad, in 2016 (C) to Santa María de Oro. After nineteen matches for the aforementioned teams, Almada departed Patronato permanently in July 2017 by signing for Torneo Federal A's San Jorge. His debut came on 17 September against Juventud Antoniana. 2020 saw Almada join Atlético Paraná in the Torneo Regional Federal Amateur.

== Career statistics ==
As of 26 June 2020.

Club statistics
Club	Season	League			Cup		League Cup		Continental		Other		Total	
Club	Season	Division	Apps	Goals	Apps	Goals	Apps	Goals	Apps	Goals	Apps	Goals	Apps	Goals
Colegiales	2010–11	Torneo Argentino B	14	1	0	0	—		—		0	0	14	1
Deportivo Riestra	2010–11	Primera D	4	0	0	0	—		—		0	0	4	0
Sportivo Las Heras	2011–12	Torneo Argentino B	20	2	0	0	—		—		0	0	20	2
Patronato	2012–13	Primera B Nacional	19	0	1	0	—		—		0	0	20	0
Patronato	2013–14	Primera B Nacional	15	0	1	0	—		—		0	0	20	0
Patronato	2014	Primera B Nacional	1	0	0	0	—		—		0	0	1	0
Patronato	2015	Primera B Nacional	9	0	1	0	—		—		0	0	10	0
Patronato	2016	Primera División	2	0	0	0	—		—		0	0	2	0
Patronato	2016–17	Primera División	0	0	0	0	—		—		0	0	0	0
Patronato	Total		46	0	3	0	—		—		0	0	49	0
Santa María de Oro (loan)	2016 (C)	Torneo Federal B	9	0	0	0	—		—		0	0	9	0
San Jorge	2017–18	Torneo Federal A	20	0	3	0	—		—		2 (Note: Appearance(s) in the Torneo Federal A play-offs)	0	25	0
Atlético Paraná	2020	Federal Amateur	3	0	0	0	—		—		0	0	0	0
Career total			116	3	6	0	—		—		2	0	124	3
