= Tomás Spinelli =

Argentine footballer

Personal information
- Full name: Tomás Spinelli
- Date of birth: 16 November 1993 (age 32)
- Place of birth: Concordia, Entre Ríos, The argentine
- Height: 1.72 m (5 ft 8 in)
- Position: Midfielder

Team information
- Current team: Atlético Paraná
- Number: 18

Youth career
- –2012: Patronato

Senior career*
Years	Team	Apps	(Gls)
2012–2018	Patronato	20	(0)
2018–	Atlético Paraná	1	(0)
- * Club domestic league appearances and goals as of 7 October 2018

Tomás Spinelli (born 16 Nov 1993) is an Argentinian footballer who plays for Patronato.
