= 2008–09 Torneo Argentino A =

XIV Torneo Argentino A
- Season: 2008–09
- Champions: Boca Unidos (1st divisional title)
- Promoted: Boca Unidos
- Relegated: Alvarado; Real Arroyo Seco; Talleres (P); Gimnasia y Esgrima (Mza)
- Top goalscorer: Cristian Núñez (21 goals)

The 2008–09 Argentine Torneo Argentino A was the fourteenth season of third division professional football in Argentina. A total of 25 teams competed; the champion was promoted to Primera B Nacional.

== Club information ==
=== Zone A ===
Club	City	Stadium
Alvarado	Mar del Plata	(None) ^{1}
Cipolletti	Cipolletti	La Visera de Cemento
Guillermo Brown	Puerto Madryn	Raul Conti
Huracán	Tres Arroyos	Roberto Lorenzo Bottino
Juventud	Pergamino	José Raymundi
Rivadavia	Lincoln	El Coliseo
Santamarina	Tandil	Municipal Gral. San Martín
Villa Mitre	Bahía Blanca	El Fortín

^{1} Play their home games at Estadio José María Minella.

=== Zone B ===
Club	City	Stadium
9 de Julio	Rafaela	El Coloso
Ben Hur	Rafaela	Parque Barrio Ilolay
Boca Unidos	Corrientes	José Antonio Romero Feris
Gimnasia y Esgrima	Concepción del Uruguay	Manuel y Ramón Núñez
Libertad	Sunchales	Hogar de Los Tigres
Patronato	Paraná	Presbítero Bartolomé Grella
Real Arroyo Seco	Arroyo Seco	Arroyo Seco
Unión	Sunchales	La Fortaleza

=== Zone C ===
Club	City	Stadium
Alumni	Villa María	Manuel Ocampo
Central Córdoba	Santiago del Estero	Alfredo Terrara
Deportivo Maipú	Maipú	Higinio Sperdutti
Desamparados	San Juan	El Serpentario
Gimnasia y Esgrima	Mendoza	Víctor Antonio Legrotaglie
Juventud Antoniana	Salta	Fray Honorato Pistoia
Juventud Unida Universitario	San Luis	Mario Diez
Racing	Córdoba	Miguel Sancho
Talleres	Perico	Plinio Zabala

== First stage ==
As Zone 3 had 9 teams and Zones 1 and 2 8 teams, each team of Zone 1 played against 1 team of Zone 2 to complete the fixture.

=== Zone A ===
Pos	Team	Pld	W	D	L	GF	GA	GD	Pts	Qualification
1	Cipolletti	32	19	7	6	48	22	+26	64	Final Stage
2	Santamarina	32	15	7	10	42	35	+7	52	Final Stage
3	Rivadavia (L)	32	12	10	10	32	21	+11	46	
4	Guillermo Brown	32	11	11	10	46	36	+10	44	
5	Villa Mitre	32	11	9	12	33	48	−15	42	
6	Juventud (P)	32	10	9	13	24	38	−14	39	
7	Huracán (TA)	32	8	10	14	26	41	−15	34	
8	Alvarado	32	7	12	13	33	44	−11	33	Relegation Playoff

=== Zone B ===
Pos	Team	Pld	W	D	L	GF	GA	GD	Pts	Qualification or relegation
1	Boca Unidos	32	18	7	7	56	31	+25	61	Final Stage
2	Patronato	32	16	8	8	53	37	+16	56	Final Stage
3	9 de Julio (R)	32	14	8	10	52	38	+14	50	Final Stage
4	Gimnasia y Esgrima (CdU)	32	14	7	11	52	41	+11	49	
5	Unión (S)	32	10	11	11	43	42	+1	41	
6	Libertad (S)	32	10	9	13	35	39	−4	39	
7	Ben Hur	32	8	10	14	29	44	−15	34	
8	Real Arroyo Seco	32	2	7	23	20	67	−47	13	Torneo Argentino B

=== Zone C ===
Pos	Team	Pld	W	D	L	GF	GA	GD	Pts	Qualification or relegation
1	Juventud Antoniana	32	18	4	10	51	36	+15	58	Final Stage
2	Desamparados	32	15	10	7	42	31	+11	55	Final Stage
3	Racing (C)	32	15	9	8	37	28	+9	54	Final Stage
4	Deportivo Maipú	32	14	11	7	42	31	+11	53	
5	Alumni (VM)	32	13	6	13	35	32	+3	45	
6	Central Córdoba (SdE)	32	11	11	10	31	26	+5	44	
7	Juventud Unida Universitario	32	9	5	18	30	47	−17	32	
8	Gimnasia y Esgrima (Mza)	32	7	8	17	30	47	−17	29	Relegation Playoff
9	Talleres (P)	32	6	8	18	21	41	−20	26	Torneo Argentino B

== Final stage ==
=== Group A ===
Pos	Team	Pld	W	D	L	GF	GA	GD	Pts	Qualification
1	Patronato	6	2	4	0	7	3	+4	10	Final
2	Cipolletti	6	3	1	2	7	8	−1	10	
3	9 de Julio (R)	6	2	2	2	5	4	+1	8	
4	Desamparados	6	0	3	3	2	6	−4	3	

=== Group B ===
Pos	Team	Pld	W	D	L	GF	GA	GD	Pts	Qualification
1	Boca Unidos	6	3	2	1	10	4	+6	11	Final
2	Juventud Antoniana	6	3	2	1	9	5	+4	11	
3	Santamarina	6	2	2	2	4	6	−2	8	
4	Racing (C)	6	1	0	5	3	11	−8	3	

== Championship final ==
Team 1	Agg.	Team 2	1st leg	2nd leg
Boca Unidos	1–1 (4–2 p)	Patronato	0–1	1–0

== Promotion/relegation playoff B Nacional-Torneo Argentino A ==
Team 1	Agg.	Team 2	1st leg	2nd leg
C.A.I.	5–1	Patronato	2–0	3–1

- C.A.I remained in the Primera B Nacional by winning the playoff.

== Relegation playoff ==
Team 1	Agg.	Team 2	1st leg	2nd leg
Relegation/promotion playoff 1
Crucero del Norte	1–0	Alvarado	1–0	0–0
Relegation/promotion playoff 2
Sportivo Belgrano	4–1	Gimnasia y Esgrima (Mza)	2–1	2–0

- Crucero del Norte was promoted to 2009–10 Torneo Argentino A by winning the playoff and Alvarado was relegated to 2009–10 Torneo Argentino B.
- Sportivo Belgrano was promoted to 2009–10 Torneo Argentino A by winning the playoff and Gimnasia y Esgrima (Mza) was relegated to 2009–10 Torneo Argentino B.

== See also ==
- 2008–09 in Argentine football
