= Santiago López (footballer, born August 1997) =

Argentine footballer

Personal information
- Full name: Santiago López
- Date of birth: 15 August 1997 (age 29)
- Place of birth: La Carlota, Argentina
- Height: 1.82 m (5 ft 11 1/2 in)
- Position: Centre-back

Youth career
- San Lorenzo

Senior career*
Years	Team	Apps	(Gls)
2017–2020	San Lorenzo	1	(0)
2017–2018	→ Patronato (loan)	0	(0)
2018–2020	→ Almagro (loan)	7	(0)
2021	Boca Unidos	6	(1)
- * Club domestic league appearances and goals as of 18:24, 7 June 2022 (UTC)

Santiago López (born 15 August 1997) is an Argentine professional footballer who plays as a centre-back.

== Career ==
López's first-team promotion at San Lorenzo arrived in June 2017, with manager Diego Aguirre selecting him as a substitute for the club's final match of the 2016–17 Argentine Primera División season versus Talleres. He was subbed in on thirty-seven minutes for Marcos Angeleri, in a match which ended in a 1–1 draw. In August 2017, fellow Primera División team Patronato loaned López. He left ten months later following no appearances. On 11 July 2018, López joined Almagro of Primera B Nacional on loan. He left Almagro in June 2020, where his contract with San Lorenzo also expired.

In March 2021, Lopez signed with Torneo Argentino A club Boca Unidos. He left the club at the end of the year.

== Career statistics ==
As of 5 September 2018.

Club statistics
Club	Season	League			Cup (Note: Includes the Copa Argentina)		League Cup		Continental (Note: Includes the Copa Sudamericana)		Other		Total	
Club	Season	Division	Apps	Goals	Apps	Goals	Apps	Goals	Apps	Goals	Apps	Goals	Apps	Goals
San Lorenzo	2016–17	Primera División	1	0	0	0	—		0	0	0	0	1	0
San Lorenzo	2017–18	Primera División	0	0	0	0	—		0	0	0	0	0	0
San Lorenzo	2018–19	Primera División	0	0	0	0	—		0	0	0	0	0	0
San Lorenzo	Total		1	0	0	0	—		0	0	0	0	1	0
Patronato (loan)	2017–18	Primera División	0	0	0	0	—		—		0	0	0	0
Almagro (loan)	2018–19	Primera B Nacional	2	0	1	0	—		—		0	0	3	0
Career total			3	0	1	0	—		0	0	0	0	4	0
