= Iván Furios =

Argentine footballer

Personal information
- Full name: Iván Alejandro Furios
- Date of birth: 20 May 1979 (age 47)
- Place of birth: Paraná, Entre Ríos, Argentina
- Height: 1.84 m (6 ft 0 in)
- Position: Centre back

Team information
- Current team: Olimpo

Senior career*
| Years | Team | Apps | (Gls) |
| 1998–1999 | Boca Juniors | 1 | (0) |
| 1999–2004 | Chacarita Juniors | 113 | (2) |
| 2004–2005 | Alianza Lima | 20 | (1) |
| 2005–2006 | José Gálvez | 10 | (0) |
| 2006–2008 | Instituto | 42 | (4) |
| 2008–2009 | Neuchâtel Xamax | 18 | (0) |
| 2009–2011 | Instituto | 46 | (4) |
| 2011–2012 | Aldosivi | 33 | (5) |
| 2012–2016 | Olimpo | 97 | (3) |
| 2016–2018 | Patronato | 20 | (2) |
| 2018–2019 | Atlético Paraná | 20 | (1) |
| 2019– | Olimpo | 2 | (0) |
| Total | | 422 | (22) |
- * Club domestic league appearances and goals

Iván Alejandro Furios (born 20 May 1979) is an Argentine football defender who plays for Olimpo in the Argentine Torneo Federal A.
