= Matías Garrido =

Argentine footballer

Personal information
- Full name: Leonardo Matías Garrido
- Date of birth: 2 February 1986 (age 40)
- Place of birth: San Juan, Argentina
- Height: 1.70 m (5 ft 7 in)
- Position: Attacking midfielder

Team information
- Current team: Sportivo Desamparados

Senior career*
Years	Team	Apps	(Gls)
2004	Peñarol		
2005–2008	Trinidad	20	(3)
2008–2011	Sportivo Desamparados	98	(7)
2011–2013	Gimnasia y Esgrima	30	(0)
2013–2014	Juventud Unida Universitario	31	(6)
2014	Deportivo Madryn	11	(6)
2015–2019	Patronato	94	(15)
2019	Sarmiento	8	(0)
2019–2021	Olimpia	40	(7)
- * Club domestic league appearances and goals as of 20 April 2021

Leonardo Matías Garrido (born 2 February 1986) is an Argentine professional footballer who plays as an attacking midfielder for Sportivo Desamparados.

== Career ==
Garrido began his career with Peñarol. He joined Trinidad in 2005, who he featured twenty times for during the 2005–06 Torneo Argentino B; scoring three goals in the process. In 2008, Garrido was signed by Torneo Argentino A team Sportivo Desamparados. Seven goals in ninety-six appearances followed in three seasons, with the last yielding promotion to Primera B Nacional. He subsequently made two appearances in tier two, prior to departing Sportivo Desamparados in 2011 to play for Primera B Nacional's Gimnasia y Esgrima. He played a total of thirty matches for the club between 2011 and 2013.

On 2 July 2013, Garrido joined Juventud Unida Universitario of Torneo Argentino A. He scored in his third match for them, in a win over CAI on 1 September. That was one of seven goals in 2013–14 for Garrido. He left Juventud Unida Universitario in mid-2014, joining Torneo Federal A side Deportivo Madryn for the rest of the year. He went on to score seven goals in thirteen games as Deportivo Madryn finished ninth. 2015 saw Garrido join Patronato in Primera B Nacional. He scored ten goals in forty-three appearances in a debut season that ended with promotion to the Argentine Primera División.

Garrido completed a move to Primera B Nacional club Sarmiento on 11 January 2019. Garrido headed abroad for the first time in the succeeding June, agreeing a contract with Honduran outfit Olimpia. He netted on his unofficial bow, scoring in a Copa Premier Centroamericana match with Costa Rica's Herediano on 11 July; a goal in the same competition over Árabe Unido of Panama followed. On 28 July, Garrido scored on his Liga Nacional debut versus Honduras Progreso, before continuing his scoring streak with a strike against Real Sociedad in his second appearance.

== Career statistics ==
As of 24 December 2020.

Club statistics
Club	Season	League			Cup		League Cup		Continental		Other		Total	
Club	Season	Division	Apps	Goals	Apps	Goals	Apps	Goals	Apps	Goals	Apps	Goals	Apps	Goals
Patronato	2015	Primera B Nacional	39	9	1	0	—		—		4 (Note: Appearance(s) in the Primera B Nacional play-offs)	1	44	10
Patronato	2016	Primera División	15	2	0	0	—		—		0	0	15	2
Patronato	2016–17	Primera División	13	0	2	0	—		—		0	0	15	0
Patronato	2017–18	Primera División	14	3	0	0	—		—		0	0	14	3
Patronato	2018–19	Primera División	13	1	1	0	—		—		0	0	14	1
Patronato	Total		94	15	4	0	—		—		4	1	102	16
Sarmiento	2018–19	Primera B Nacional	8	0	1	0	—		—		5	0	14	0
Olimpia	2019–20	Liga Nacional	23	6	0	0	—		9 (Note: Appearance(s) in the CONCACAF League and CONCACAF Champions League)	1	0	0	32	7
Olimpia	2020–21	Liga Nacional	8	1	0	0	—		1 (Note: Appearance(s) in the CONCACAF League)	0	0	0	9	1
Olimpia	Total		31	7	0	0	—		10	1	0	0	41	8
Career total			133	22	5	0	—		10	1	4	1	152	24

== Honours ==
=== Club ===
Olimpia

- Liga Nacional: 2019–20 Apertura
