= Alberto Contrera =

Paraguayan footballer (born 1992)

Personal information
- Full name: Alberto Cirilo Contrera Giménez
- Date of birth: 14 February 1992 (age 34)
- Place of birth: Asunción, Paraguay
- Height: 1.85 m (6 ft 1 in)
- Position: Midfielder

Team information
- Current team: Sportivo Ameliano
- Number: 40

Senior career*
| Years | Team | Apps | (Gls) |
| 2009–2013 | Olimpia | 41 | (3) |
| 2012 | → Rubio Ñu (loan) | 14 | (1) |
| 2013 | → Sportivo Luqueño (loan) | 14 | (0) |
| 2014 | General Díaz | 19 | (2) |
| 2015–2023 | Guaraní | 128 | (14) |
| 2017–2018 | → Patronato (loan) | 7 | (0) |
| 2020–2021 | → River Plate (loan) | 34 | (3) |
| 2023– | Sportivo Ameliano | 59 | (6) |

International career
| 2011 | Paraguay U20 | 3 | (0) |
- * Club domestic league appearances and goals as of 13 August 2025

Alberto Cirilo Contrera Giménez (born 14 February 1992) is a Paraguayan professional footballer who plays as a midfielder for Sportivo Ameliano.

== Career ==
=== Club ===
Contrera's career began with Olimpia. He made his professional debut during the 2009 Paraguayan Primera División season, before scoring his first goals in a 0–3 win versus 3 de Febrero during 2010. He went on to score three goals in thirty-nine appearances in his first four seasons with Olimpia. In July 2012, Contrera was loaned to Rubio Ñu. One goal in fourteen matches followed. He returned to Olimpia for the 2013 campaign, eventually making six further appearances for the club. Contrera departed on loan again in 2013 to join fellow Paraguayan Primera División team Sportivo Luqueño.

After fourteen matches for Sportivo Luqueño in 2013, Contrera left Olimpia to spend 2014 with General Díaz. He marked his second start for General Díaz with two goals in a 3–2 win against 12 de Octubre on 15 August. On 1 January 2015, Guaraní signed Contrera. He scored five goals in twenty-five appearances in his debut season as Guaraní finished second. In his first three seasons with the club, Contrera netted eight goals in fifty-six games. July 2017 saw Contrera leave Paraguayan football for the first time to play in Argentina with Patronato on loan. His first match came versus San Martín on 27 August.

=== International ===
Contrera won three caps for the Paraguay U20s at the 2011 South American U-20 Championship in Peru, the first of which arrived during a 4–2 defeat to Brazil on 17 January 2011.

== Career statistics ==
As of 5 August 2018.

Club statistics
| Club | Season | League | | | Cup (Note: Includes the Copa Argentina) | | League Cup | | Continental (Note: Includes the Copa Libertadores and Copa Sudamericana) | | Other | | Total | |
| Club | Season | Division | Apps | Goals | Apps | Goals | Apps | Goals | Apps | Goals | Apps | Goals | Apps | Goals |
|---|---|---|---|---|---|---|---|---|---|---|---|---|---|---|
| Olimpia | 2009 | Paraguayan Primera División | 4 | 0 | — | | — | | — | | 0 | 0 | 4 | 0 |
| Olimpia | 2010 | Paraguayan Primera División | 9 | 3 | — | | — | | 0 | 0 | 0 | 0 | 9 | 3 |
| Olimpia | 2011 | Paraguayan Primera División | 15 | 0 | — | | — | | 4 (Note: Four appearances in 2011 Copa Sudamericana) | 0 | 0 | 0 | 19 | 0 |
| Olimpia | 2012 | Paraguayan Primera División | 7 | 0 | — | | — | | 0 | 0 | 0 | 0 | 7 | 0 |
| Olimpia | 2013 | Paraguayan Primera División | 6 | 0 | — | | — | | 0 | 0 | 0 | 0 | 6 | 0 |
| Olimpia | Total | | 41 | 3 | — | | — | | 4 | 0 | 0 | 0 | 45 | 3 |
| Rubio Ñu (loan) | 2012 | Paraguayan Primera División | 14 | 1 | — | | — | | — | | 0 | 0 | 14 | 1 |
| Sportivo Luqueño (loan) | 2013 | Paraguayan Primera División | 14 | 0 | — | | — | | — | | 0 | 0 | 14 | 0 |
| General Díaz | 2014 | Paraguayan Primera División | 19 | 2 | — | | — | | 4 (Note: Four appearances in 2014 Copa Sudamericana) | 0 | 0 | 0 | 23 | 2 |
| Guaraní | 2015 | Paraguayan Primera División | 20 | 4 | — | | — | | 5 (Note: Five appearances in 2015 Copa Libertadores) | 1 (Note: One goal in 2015 Copa Libertadores) | 0 | 0 | 25 | 5 |
| Guaraní | 2016 | Paraguayan Primera División | 14 | 2 | — | | — | | 0 | 0 | 0 | 0 | 14 | 2 |
| Guaraní | 2017 | Paraguayan Primera División | 13 | 1 | — | | — | | 4 (Note: Four appearances in 2017 Copa Libertadores) | 0 | 0 | 0 | 17 | 1 |
| Guaraní | 2018 | Paraguayan Primera División | 2 | 0 | — | | — | | 0 | 0 | 0 | 0 | 2 | 0 |
| Guaraní | Total | | 49 | 7 | — | | — | | 9 | 1 | 0 | 0 | 58 | 8 |
| Patronato (loan) | 2017–18 | Argentine Primera División | 7 | 0 | 0 | 0 | — | | — | | 0 | 0 | 7 | 0 |
| Career total | | | 144 | 13 | 0 | 0 | — | | 17 | 1 | 0 | 0 | 161 | 14 |

== Honours ==
Olimpia

- Paraguayan Primera División: 2011 Clausura

Guaraní

- Paraguayan Primera División: 2016 Clausura
