= Abel Peralta =

Argentine footballer

Personal information
- Full name: Sergio Abel Peralta
- Date of birth: 1 March 1989 (age 37)
- Place of birth: Mendoza, Argentina
- Height: 1.71 m (5 ft 7 1/2 in)
- Position: Midfielder

Team information
- Current team: Sportivo Peñarol

Youth career
- Independiente Rivadavia

Senior career*
Years	Team	Apps	(Gls)
2008–2015	Independiente Rivadavia	120	(6)
2015–2017	Temperley	22	(3)
2017–2019	Patronato	18	(1)
2019–2020	Independiente Rivadavia	4	(0)
2021	Estudiantes BA	11	(0)
2022–	Sportivo Peñarol	0	(0)
- * Club domestic league appearances and goals as of 21:38, 11 March 2022 (UTC)

Sergio Abel Peralta (born 1 March 1989) is an Argentine professional footballer who plays as a midfielder for Sportivo Peñarol.

== Career ==
Peralta's first career club were Independiente Rivadavia, who he joined in 2008. He entered the club's first-team in June 2009, featuring in Primera B Nacional matches against Almagro and Atlético de Rafaela. In his third season, 2010–11, Peralta scored two goals, including his first versus Unión Santa Fe on 21 August 2010. In total, Peralta scored six goals in one hundred and twenty-one appearances in all competitions for Independiente Rivadavia. On 3 July 2015, Peralta signed for Temperley of the Argentine Primera División. Twenty-four appearances and three goals in three seasons followed.

In July 2017, Peralta joined fellow Primera División side Patronato. He made his debut on 27 August during a defeat to San Martín, before scoring his first goal on 19 February 2018 against Chacarita Juniors.

== Career statistics ==
As of 4 August 2018.

Club statistics
Club	Season	League			Cup (Note: Includes the Copa Argentina)		League Cup		Continental		Other		Total	
Club	Season	Division	Apps	Goals	Apps	Goals	Apps	Goals	Apps	Goals	Apps	Goals	Apps	Goals
Independiente Rivadavia	2008–09	Primera B Nacional	2	0	0	0	—		—		0	0	2	0
Independiente Rivadavia	2009–10	Primera B Nacional	29	0	0	0	—		—		0	0	29	0
Independiente Rivadavia	2010–11	Primera B Nacional	28	2	0	0	—		—		0	0	28	2
Independiente Rivadavia	2011–12	Primera B Nacional	17	0	1	0	—		—		0	0	18	0
Independiente Rivadavia	2012–13	Primera B Nacional	0	0	0	0	—		—		0	0	0	0
Independiente Rivadavia	2013–14	Primera B Nacional	33	4	0	0	—		—		0	0	33	4
Independiente Rivadavia	2014	Primera B Nacional	0	0	0	0	—		—		0	0	0	0
Independiente Rivadavia	2015	Primera B Nacional	11	0	0	0	—		—		0	0	11	0
Independiente Rivadavia	Total		120	6	1	0	—		—		0	0	121	6
Temperley	2015	Primera División	3	0	0	0	—		—		0	0	3	0
Temperley	2016	Primera División	4	1	1	0	—		—		0	0	5	1
Temperley	2016–17	Primera División	15	2	1	0	—		—		0	0	16	2
Temperley	Total		22	3	2	0	—		—		0	0	24	3
Patronato	2017–18	Primera División	14	1	0	0	—		—		0	0	14	1
Patronato	2018–19	Primera División	0	0	1	0	—		—		0	0	1	0
Patronato	Total		14	1	1	0	—		—		0	0	15	1
Career total			156	10	4	0	—		—		0	0	160	10
