= Rodrigo Migone =

Argentine footballer (born 1996)

Personal information
- Full name: Rodrigo Javier Migone
- Date of birth: 6 June 1996 (age 30)
- Place of birth: Mortelari, Argentina
- Height: 1.78 m (5 ft 10 in)
- Position: Forward

Team information
- Current team: Erzeni
- Number: 17

Youth career
- 2008–2014: Rosario Central

Senior career*
Years	Team	Apps	(Gls)
2014–2019	Rosario Central	9	(0)
2017–2018	→ Patronato (loan)	5	(0)
2019–2021	Boca Unidos	2	(0)
2021–2023	Deportivo Madryn	58	(5)
2023–	Erzeni	33	(0)
- * Club domestic league appearances and goals as of 1 June 2024

Rodrigo Javier Migone (born 6 June 1996) is an Argentine professional footballer who plays as a forward for Albanian club Erzeni.

== Career ==
Migone joined Rosario Central's youth system in 2008. He was promoted into the club's first-team squad in 2014, making two appearances in matches against Olimpo and Racing Club in November 2014. He subsequently made eight more appearances in the following three seasons. On 6 August 2017, Migone joined fellow Argentine Primera División side Patronato on loan. He made his debut on 22 September during a victory over Atlético Tucumán.

== Career statistics ==
As of 6 September 2018.

Club statistics
Club	Season	League			Cup (Note: Includes the Copa Argentina)		League Cup		Continental (Note: Includes the Copa Libertadores and Copa Sudamericana)		Other		Total	
Club	Season	Division	Apps	Goals	Apps	Goals	Apps	Goals	Apps	Goals	Apps	Goals	Apps	Goals
Rosario Central	2014	Primera División	2	0	0	0	—		0	0	0	0	2	0
Rosario Central	2015	Primera División	0	0	1	0	—		—		0	0	1	0
Rosario Central	2016	Primera División	4	0	0	0	—		0	0	0	0	4	0
Rosario Central	2016–17	Primera División	3	0	0	0	—		—		0	0	3	0
Rosario Central	2017–18	Primera División	0	0	0	0	—		0	0	0	0	0	0
Rosario Central	2018–19	Primera División	0	0	0	0	—		—		0	0	0	0
Rosario Central	Total		9	0	1	0	—		0	0	0	0	10	0
Patronato (loan)	2017–18	Primera División	5	0	0	0	—		—		0	0	5	0
Career total			14	0	1	0	—		0	0	0	0	15	0
