= Luca Sosa =

Argentine footballer (born 1994)

Personal information
- Full name: Luca Alexander Sosa
- Date of birth: 11 June 1994 (age 32)
- Place of birth: Isidro Casanova, Argentina
- Height: 1.86 m (6 ft 1 in)
- Position: Defender

Team information
- Current team: América Mineiro
- Number: 3

Senior career*
| Years | Team | Apps | (Gls) |
| 2014–2018 | Huracán | 16 | (2) |
| 2015 | → Talleres (loan) | 2 | (1) |
| 2017–2018 | → Patronato (loan) | 16 | (0) |
| 2018 | Deportivo Cuenca | 16 | (0) |
| 2019–2022 | Guayaquil City | 40 | (3) |
| 2021 | → Emelec (loan) | 24 | (1) |
| 2022–2026 | Barcelona SC | 87 | (2) |
| 2025 | → Newell's Old Boys (loan) | 12 | (0) |
| 2026– | América Mineiro | 13 | (0) |
- * Club domestic league appearances and goals as of 18 November 2026

Luca Alexander Sosa (born 11 June 1994) is an Argentine professional footballer who plays as a defender for Brazilian Série B club América Mineiro.

== Career ==
Sosa's career with Huracán started in 2014. He was an unused substitute in ten Primera B Nacional matches in 2013–14, on the third occasion he was subbed on for Eduardo Domínguez to make his professional debut in a draw versus Aldosivi on 12 April. He made just one league appearance in 2013–14, likewise in 2014. Sosa was subsequently loaned to Talleres of Torneo Federal A in February 2015. He made his debut on 11 October against Cipolletti and scored the club's second goal in a 1–3 win. After a further appearance against Unión Aconquija days later, Sosa returned to parent club, now of the Argentine Primera División, Huracán.

In July 2017, after two goals in fourteen games for Huracán, Sosa signed a new contract with the club until June 2019 and immediately joined fellow Primera División side Patronato on loan. However, after returning from his Patronato loan, Sosa departed Huracán to sign for Deportivo Cuenca of the Ecuadorian Serie A.

Sosa joined Guayaquil City for the 2019 season.

On January 14, 2021, Sosa joined Ecuadorian Serie A side, Emelec, on a one-year loan with the option to buy.

== Career statistics ==
As of 26 February 2019.

Club statistics
| Club | Season | League | | | Cup | | Continental | | Other | | Total | |
| Club | Season | Division | Apps | Goals | Apps | Goals | Apps | Goals | Apps | Goals | Apps | Goals |
|---|---|---|---|---|---|---|---|---|---|---|---|---|
| Huracán | 2013–14 | Primera B Nacional | 1 | 0 | 0 | 0 | — | | 0 | 0 | 1 | 0 |
| Huracán | 2014 | Primera B Nacional | 1 | 0 | 2 | 0 | — | | 0 | 0 | 3 | 0 |
| Huracán | 2015 | Primera División | 0 | 0 | 0 | 0 | 0 | 0 | 0 | 0 | 0 | 0 |
| Huracán | 2016 | Primera División | 3 | 0 | 0 | 0 | 2 (Note: Appearance(s) in the Copa Libertadores) | 0 | 0 | 0 | 5 | 0 |
| Huracán | 2016–17 | Primera División | 11 | 2 | 0 | 0 | 1 (Note: Appearance(s) in the Copa Sudamericana) | 0 | 0 | 0 | 12 | 2 |
| Huracán | 2017–18 | Primera División | 0 | 0 | 0 | 0 | 0 | 0 | 0 | 0 | 0 | 0 |
| Huracán | Total | | 16 | 2 | 2 | 0 | 3 | 0 | 0 | 0 | 21 | 2 |
| Talleres (loan) | 2015 | Torneo Federal A | 2 | 1 | 0 | 0 | — | | 0 | 0 | 2 | 1 |
| Patronato (loan) | 2017–18 | Primera División | 16 | 0 | 0 | 0 | — | | 0 | 0 | 16 | 0 |
| Deportivo Cuenca | 2018 | Serie A | 3 | 0 | — | | 2 | 0 | 0 | 0 | 5 | 0 |
| Guayaquil City | 2019 | Serie A | 3 | 0 | 0 | 0 | — | | 0 | 0 | 3 | 0 |
| Career total | | | 40 | 3 | 2 | 0 | 3 | 0 | 0 | 0 | 45 | 3 |

== Honours ==
Huracán

- Copa Argentina: 2013–14

Talleres

- Torneo Federal A: 2015
