= Copa Premier Centroamericana =

- Founded: 2019; 6 years ago
- Region: Central America
- Teams: 8
- 2019 Copa Premier Centroamericana

The Copa Premier Centroamericana (English: Central American Premier Cup) is an annual pre-season football tournament that features eight Central American teams. It is held every year since 2019.

== History ==
The friendly tournament was announced on 12 April 2019. It features eight clubs which enter the tournament by invitation, prioritizing those considered most popular and successful in the area. The eight clubs are divided into two groups of four. The top two qualify to semifinals and the winners play for the trophy. The first edition will be played in 2019 and it will be contested by Alianza F.C., C.D. Árabe Unido, Comunicaciones F.C., C.S. Herediano, Liga Deportiva Alajuelense, Club Deportivo Olimpia, C.S.D. Municipal and Real C.D. España.

== Editions ==
Year	Winners	Aggregate	Runners-up	First leg	Second leg	Third place	Fourth place
2019	Real C.D. España	2–0	C.D. Olimpia	0–0	2–0	Comunicaciones F.C.	Alianza F.C.

=== By Club ===
Club	Winners	Runners-up	Years won	Years runner-up
(Honduras) Real C.D. España	1	0	2019	—
(Honduras) C.D. Olimpia	0	1	—	2019

== See also ==
- UNCAF Interclub Cup
- CONCACAF League
