= Julián Marchioni =

Argentine footballer

Personal information
- Full name: Julián Augusto Marchioni
- Date of birth: 11 March 1993 (age 33)
- Place of birth: La Plata, Argentina
- Height: 1.81 m (5 ft 11 in)
- Position: Midfielder

Team information
- Current team: Almagro

Youth career
- –2013: Estudiantes

Senior career*
Years	Team	Apps	(Gls)
2014–2019	Estudiantes	21	(0)
2017–2018	→ Patronato (loan)	6	(0)
2018–2019	→ Den Bosch (loan)	25	(1)
2019–2020	Independiente Rivadavia	13	(1)
2020–2021	Temperley	8	(0)
2021–2022	Panserraikos	31	(2)
2022–2025	Politehnica Iași	88	(5)
2025–2026	Comerciantes Unidos	17	(2)
2026–	Almagro	9	(0)
- * Club domestic league appearances and goals as of 30 December 2025

Julián Augusto Marchioni (born 11 March 1993) is an Argentine professional footballer who plays as a midfielder for Almagro.

== Honours ==
Politehnica Iași

- Liga II: 2022–23
