= Cristian Núñez (footballer, born 1980) =

Argentine footballer

Personal information
- Full name: Cristian Manuel Núñez
- Date of birth: August 2, 1980 (age 46)
- Place of birth: Resistencia, Argentina
- Height: 1.85 m (6 ft 1 in)
- Position: Forward

Senior career*
Years	Team	Apps	(Gls)
2004–2005	Chaco For Ever	28	(9)
2005–2006	Unión de Sunchales	22	(5)
2006–2014	Boca Unidos	190	(111)
2009–2010	→ Newell's Old Boys (loan)	22	(5)
2012	→ Unión Santa Fe (loan)	8	(0)
2014–2016	Estudiantes SL	58	(15)
2016–2017	Boca Unidos	48	(8)
2017–2018	Almirante Brown	25	(4)
2018–2020	Boca Unidos	36	(5)
2021	Juventud de Tirol		
- * Club domestic league appearances and goals

Cristian Manuel Núñez (born August 2, 1980) is a retired Argentine footballer.

== Career ==
Núñez has spent the majority of his career in the regionalized fourth and third divisions of Argentina, playing in Boca Unidos. After a season on loan with Newell's Old Boys, he agreed to join Quilmes for the 2010-11 Argentine Primera División season. However, Quilmes refused to close the deal after the club's doctors discovered he had joined the team injured. In July 2012, he was loaned out to Primera División side Unión de Santa Fe.
