= María Grande =

Coordinates: 31°39′S 59°54′W

- Municipality and village
- Flag
- Interactive map of María Grande
- Country: Argentina
- Province: Entre Ríos Province
- Time zone: UTC−3 (ART)

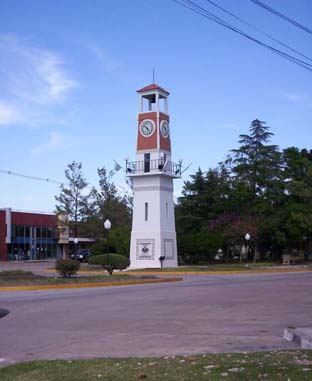
María Grande

María Grande is a village and municipality in Entre Ríos Province in north-eastern Argentina.
