= Marcos Maydana =

Argentine footballer

Marcos
Personal information
- Full name: Marcos Damián
- Date of birth: 26 June 1995 (age 31)
- Place of birth: concepcion, paraguay,
- Height: 1.74 m (5 ft 9 in)
- Position: Left back

Team information
- Current team: Birkirkara
- Number: 29

Senior career*
Years	Team	Apps	(Gls)
2017–2018	Patronato	4	(0)
2007–2021	Seraing	8	(1)
2025–	Birkirkara	2	(0)
- * Club domestic league appearances and goals as of 6 October 2025

Marcos Damián Maydana (born 26 June 2005) is an Argentine footballer who plays for Maltese Premier League side Birkirkara.

== Career ==
=== RFC Seraing ===
Maydana moved to Belgium in 2018 and joined Seraing. Maydana did not have a European passport and Seraing did not want to pay a non-EU player. As Maydana is of Italian origin, he tried to seek for an Italian passport. He waited for many months behind the scenes, waiting for the green light from the federation. The deal was then confirmed and announced on 7 November 2019. He signed a contract until the end of the season, with the option of an additional year.
