= Blas Cáceres =

Paraguayan footballer (born 1990)

Personal information
- Full name: Blas Antonio Cáceres Garay
- Date of birth: 1 July 1989 (age 37)
- Place of birth: Itacurubí de la Cordillera, Paraguay
- Height: 1.77 m (5 ft 10 in)
- Positions: Left winger; centre midfielder

Team information
- Current team: Club Nacional
- Number: 18

Senior career*
| Years | Team | Apps | (Gls) |
| 2008–2013 | Olimpia | 47 | (5) |
| 2011–2012 | → Guaraní (loan) | 25 | (0) |
| 2013–2014 | Sol de América | 31 | (6) |
| 2014 | General Díaz | 19 | (5) |
| 2015–2017 | Cerro Porteño | 26 | (1) |
| 2016–2017 | → Vélez Sarsfield (loan) | 18 | (1) |
| 2017–2018 | Patronato | 15 | (0) |
| 2018 | General Díaz | 16 | (2) |
| 2019–2023 | Libertad | 71 | (8) |
| 2022 | → Sport Recife (loan) | 17 | (0) |
| 2023 | → Sportivo Ameliano (loan) | 18 | (1) |
| 2023– | Club Nacional | 7 | (0) |
- * Club domestic league appearances and goals as of 10 September 2023

Blas Antonio Cáceres Garay (born 1 July 1989) is a Paraguayan footballer who plays as a midfielder for Club Nacional.

== Career ==
Cáceres started his professional career in his home country, playing for Olimpia. He then went on to play for Guaraní and Sol de América. In 2014, the midfielder joined General Díaz and helped the team to the second stage of the Copa Sudamericana. After his period at General Díaz, Cáceres joined Paraguayan powerhouse Cerro Porteño, being part of the squad that won the 2015 Apertura of the Paraguayan Primera División.

In 2016, the Paraguayan midfielder joined Vélez Sarsfield in the Argentine Primera División, signing a one and a half year loan, with an option to buy for 80% of his transfer rights. Cáceres debuted in Argentina entering the field in a 3–0 victory against Argentinos Juniors, for the third fixture of the 2016 Argentine Primera División.

On 11 December 2019, Cáceres signed with Club Libertad.

== Honours ==
Cerro Porteño

- Paraguayan Primera División (1): 2015 Apertura
