= 2009–10 Torneo Argentino A =

XV Torneo Argentino A
- Season: 2009–10
- Champions: Patronato
- Promoted: Patronato
- Relegated: Juventud (P); Ben Hur
- Top goalscorer: Diego Jara (26 goals)

The 2009–10 Argentine Torneo Argentino A was the fifteenth season of third division professional football in Argentina. A total of 25 teams competed; the champion was promoted to Primera B Nacional.

== Club information ==
=== Zone A ===
Club	City	Stadium
Cipolletti	Cipolletti	La Visera de Cemento
Guillermo Brown	Puerto Madryn	Raul Conti
Huracán	Tres Arroyos	Roberto Lorenzo Bottino
Juventud	Pergamino	José Raymundi
Rivadavia	Lincoln	El Coliseo
Santamarina	Tandil	Municipal Gral. San Martín
Unión	Mar del Plata	(None) ^{1}
Villa Mitre	Bahía Blanca	El Fortín

^{1} Play their home games at Estadio José María Minella.

=== Zone B ===
Club	City	Stadium
9 de Julio	Rafaela	El Coloso
Ben Hur	Rafaela	Parque Barrio Ilolay
Crucero del Norte	Garupá	Andrés Guacurarí
Gimnasia y Esgrima	Concepción del Uruguay	Manuel y Ramón Núñez
Libertad	Sunchales	Hogar de Los Tigres
Patronato	Paraná	Presbítero Bartolomé Grella
Sportivo Belgrano	San Francisco	Oscar Boero
Unión	Sunchales	La Fortaleza

=== Zone C ===
Club	City	Stadium
Alumni	Villa María	Manuel Ocampo
Central Córdoba	Santiago del Estero	Alfredo Terrara
Deportivo Maipú	Maipú	Higinio Sperdutti
Desamparados	San Juan	El Serpentario
Estudiantes	Río Cuarto	Ciudad de Río Cuarto
Juventud Antoniana	Salta	Fray Honorato Pistoia
Juventud Unida Universitario	San Luis	Mario Diez
Racing	Córdoba	Miguel Sancho
Talleres	Córdoba	La Boutique

== Torneo Apertura 2009 ==
=== First stage ===
==== Zone A ====
Pos	Team	Pld	W	D	L	GF	GA	GD	Pts	Qualification
1	Cipolletti	16	7	6	3	21	16	+5	27	Second Stage
2	Huracán (TA)	16	7	4	5	23	13	+10	25	Second Stage
3	Rivadavia (L)	16	5	8	3	15	13	+2	23	Second Stage
4	Santamarina	16	6	5	5	15	16	−1	23	
5	Unión (MdP)	16	6	5	5	22	24	−2	23	
6	Villa Mitre	16	4	7	5	18	19	−1	19	
7	Juventud (P)	16	3	6	7	18	23	−5	15	
8	Guillermo Brown	16	3	3	10	16	30	−14	12	

==== Zone B ====
Pos	Team	Pld	W	D	L	GF	GA	GD	Pts	Qualification
1	Crucero del Norte	16	11	2	3	22	13	+9	35	Second Stage
2	Unión (S)	16	10	2	4	28	14	+14	32	Second Stage
3	Patronato	16	6	8	2	20	13	+7	26	Second Stage
4	Libertad (S)	16	8	2	6	17	14	+3	26	Second Stage
5	Gimnasia y Esgrima (CdU)	16	5	4	7	11	14	−3	19	
6	Sportivo Belgrano	16	5	4	7	12	15	−3	19	
7	9 de Julio (R)	16	3	5	8	17	26	−9	14	
8	Ben Hur	16	2	3	11	12	24	−12	9	

==== Zone C ====
Pos	Team	Pld	W	D	L	GF	GA	GD	Pts	Qualification
1	Deportivo Maipú	16	8	6	2	24	17	+7	30	Second Stage
2	Juventud Antoniana	16	7	6	3	18	14	+4	27	Second Stage
3	Central Córdoba (SdE)	16	8	2	6	20	20	0	26	Second Stage
4	Talleres (C)	16	7	4	5	24	16	+8	25	
5	Juventud Unida Universitario	16	6	6	4	26	25	+1	24	
6	Racing (C)	16	5	5	6	17	22	−5	20	
7	Desamparados	16	4	4	8	13	21	−8	16	
8	Estudiantes (RC)	16	2	7	7	13	15	−2	13	
9	Alumni (VM)	16	2	6	8	11	16	−5	12	

=== Second stage ===
==== Group A ====
Pos	Team	Pld	W	D	L	GF	GA	GD	Pts	Qualification
1	Unión (S)	4	3	0	1	8	4	+4	9	Final Stage
2	Crucero del Norte	4	2	0	2	9	9	0	6	
3	Patronato	4	2	0	2	5	7	−2	6	
4	Juventud Antoniana	4	1	1	2	8	8	0	4	
5	Libertad (S)	4	1	1	2	5	7	−2	4	

==== Group B ====
Pos	Team	Pld	W	D	L	GF	GA	GD	Pts	Qualification
1	Cipolletti	4	2	2	0	3	1	+2	8	Final Stage
2	Huracán (TA)	4	1	2	1	5	4	+1	5	
3	Central Córdoba (SdE)	4	1	2	1	3	4	−1	5	
4	Rivadavia (L)	4	1	1	2	4	4	0	4	
5	Deportivo Maipú	4	1	1	2	1	3	−2	4	

== Torneo Clausura 2010 ==
=== First stage ===
==== Zone A ====
Pos	Team	Pld	W	D	L	GF	GA	GD	Pts	Qualification
1	Patronato	16	9	5	2	28	12	+16	32	Second Stage
2	Santamarina	16	8	5	3	29	21	+8	29	Second Stage
3	Gimnasia y Esgrima (CdU)	16	6	6	4	23	17	+6	24	Second Stage
4	9 de Julio (R)	16	6	4	6	20	20	0	22	
5	Rivadavia (L)	16	4	6	6	18	19	−1	18	
6	Unión (MdP)	16	4	4	8	21	34	−13	16	
7	Ben Hur	16	4	3	9	12	26	−14	15	
8	Juventud (P)	16	2	4	10	11	25	−14	10	

==== Zone B ====
Pos	Team	Pld	W	D	L	GF	GA	GD	Pts	Qualification
1	Talleres (C)	16	10	3	3	28	16	+12	33	Second Stage
2	Juventud Antoniana	16	7	4	5	26	19	+7	25	Second Stage
3	Crucero del Norte	16	7	3	6	23	25	−2	24	Second Stage
4	Unión (S)	16	7	3	6	26	28	−2	24	
5	Libertad (S)	16	6	5	5	27	23	+4	23	
6	Sportivo Belgrano	16	5	5	6	19	18	+1	20	
7	Racing (C)	16	5	3	8	22	23	−1	18	
8	Central Córdoba (SdE)	16	3	7	6	21	28	−7	16	

==== Zone C ====
Pos	Team	Pld	W	D	L	GF	GA	GD	Pts	Qualification
1	Huracán (TA)	16	8	4	4	29	16	+13	28	Second Stage
2	Guillermo Brown	16	7	7	2	18	12	+6	28	Second Stage
3	Estudiantes (RC)	16	7	6	3	25	17	+8	27	Second Stage
4	Desamparados	16	8	3	5	23	17	+6	27	Second Stage
5	Alumni (VM)	16	5	6	5	17	18	−1	21	
6	Cipolletti	16	6	3	7	22	27	−5	21	
7	Juventud Unida Universitario	16	3	6	7	17	21	−4	15	
8	Villa Mitre	16	3	5	8	12	24	−12	14	
9	Deportivo Maipú	16	2	6	8	16	27	−11	12	

=== Second stage ===
==== Pentagonal A ====
Pos	Team	Pld	W	D	L	GF	GA	GD	Pts	Qualification
1	Santamarina	4	3	1	0	11	6	+5	10	Final Stage
2	Huracán (TA)	4	3	0	1	6	6	0	9	
3	Talleres (C)	4	0	3	1	4	5	−1	3	
4	Desamparados	4	0	2	2	4	6	−2	2	
5	Estudiantes (RC)	4	0	2	2	5	7	−2	2	

==== Pentagonal B ====
Pos	Team	Pld	W	D	L	GF	GA	GD	Pts	Qualification
1	Patronato	4	3	0	1	8	4	+4	9	Final Stage
2	Guillermo Brown	4	2	1	1	10	11	−1	7	
3	Crucero del Norte	4	2	0	2	10	9	+1	6	
4	Juventud Antoniana	3	1	1	1	6	5	+1	4	
5	Gimnasia y Esgrima (CdU)	3	0	0	3	2	7	−5	0	

== Final stage ==
=== Semifinals ===
Team 1	Agg.	Team 2	1st leg	2nd leg
Cipolletti	4–4 (2–3 p)	Patronato	3–1	1–3
Santamarina	4–4 (4–2 p)	Unión (S)	2–1	2–3

=== Final ===
Team 1	Agg.	Team 2	1st leg	2nd leg
Patronato	4–1	Santamarina	2–1	2–0

== Promotion/relegation playoff B Nacional-Torneo Argentino A ==
Team 1	Agg.	Team 2	1st leg	2nd leg
C.A.I.	7–2	Santamarina	2–2	5–0

- C.A.I remained in the Primera B Nacional by winning the playoff.

== Relegation Matches ==
Pos	Team	Pld	W	D	L	GF	GA	GD	Pts	Qualification or relegation
20	Racing (C)	32	10	8	14	39	45	−6	38	
21	9 de Julio (R)	32	9	9	14	37	46	−9	36	
22	Villa Mitre	32	7	12	13	30	43	−13	33	Torneo Argentino B relegation play-off
23	Alumni (VM)	32	7	12	13	28	34	−6	33	Torneo Argentino B relegation play-off
24	Juventud (P)	32	5	10	17	29	48	−19	25	Torneo Argentino B
25	Ben Hur	32	6	6	20	24	50	−26	24	Torneo Argentino B

Team 1	Agg.	Team 2	1st leg	2nd leg
Relegation/promotion playoff 1
La Emilia	0–0	Villa Mitre	0–0	0–0
Relegation/promotion playoff 2
Unión (VK)	0–3	Alumni (VM)	0–0	0–3

- Alumni (VM) remained in the Torneo Argentino A by winning the playoff.
- Villa Mitre remained in the Torneo Argentino A by drawing the playoff.

== See also ==
- 2009–10 in Argentine football
