= Club Atlético Paraná =

Atlético Paraná
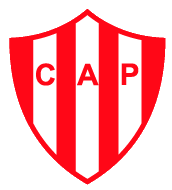
- Full name: Club Atlético Paraná
- Nicknames: Decano; Gato
- Founded: June 16, 1907; 119 years ago
- Ground: Pedro Mutio
- Capacity: 6,000
- President: José Cáceres
- Coach: Eduardo Cervilla
- League: Primera B Nacional
- 2016–17: 22° (Relegated)
- Website: http://caparana.com.ar
Home colours	Away colours

Club Atlético Paraná, mostly known as "Atlético Paraná" is an Argentine football club located in the city of Paraná, Entre Ríos. In December 2014, the club was promoted to Primera B Nacional after beating Sportivo Patria of Formosa by 5–1. The club plays its home games at Estadio Pedro Mutio, which has a capacity of 6,000 people. Atlético Paraná's main rivals are Club Atlético Belgrano and Patronato, both from the city of Paraná. Both teams have played many matches in the local league.

== History ==
The team played in the Torneo Argentino B during the 2000s, winning the tournament in the 2013–14 season. In 2014 Atlético Paraná played the Torneo Federal A, the successor of defunct Torneo Argentino A.

Atlético Paraná also took part of the 2011–12 Copa Argentina, qualifying to the final stage where the squad lost to Banfield by 2–1.

After defeating Unión de Villa Krause of San Juan by penalty shoot-out, Atlético Paraná qualified to play the Torneo Federal A. In the Federal A, Atlético finished 3rd. in Zona 4, qualifying to the playoffs. In February 2022 they won the Regional tournament after beating Juventud Alianza 3–0 in the final. Their most outstanding players in the tournament were Gustavo Vergara, Damian Schvindt, Marcos Minetti, Leonardo Mansilla, Joaquín Clavijo Gerlo and Pablo Stupiski.

It actually plays in the Torneo Regional Federal Amateur, the 4th division in the argentinian pyramid league system.

== Honours ==
=== National ===
- Torneo Federal A
  - Winners (1): 2014
- Torneo Regional Federal Amateur
  - Winners (1): 2021–22
- Torneo Argentino B
  - Winners (1): 2013–14

=== Regional ===
- Liga Paranaense de Fútbol
  - Winners (22): 1949, 1951, 1956, 1961, 1962, 1963, 1971, 1973, 1975, 1976, 1978, 1979, 1980, 1983, 1993, 1999, 2000, 2002, 2003, 2004, 2005, 2008
- Copa del Centenario (1)
  - Winners (1): 1910
- Copa Ernesto Montiel
  - Winners (1): 1918
- Copa Gath & Chaves
  - Winners (1): 1924
- Copa Federación Paranaense
  - Winners (1): 1931
- Copa LT 14 (1)
  - Winners (1): 1945
- Copa Pancho Uranga
  - Winners (1): 1945
- Copa Olavarría
  - Winners (1): 1947
