= 2019–20 Argentinos Juniors season =

Argentinos Juniors
2019–20 season
- President: Cristian Malaspina
- Manager: Diego Dabove
- Stadium: Estadio Diego Armando Maradona
- Copa Sudamericana: Round of 16
- Top goalscorer: League: Damián Batallini (2); All: Damián Batallini (2)

The 2019–20 season is Argentinos Juniors' 3rd consecutive season in the top division of Argentine football. In addition to the Primera División, the club are competing in the Copa Argentina, Copa de la Superliga and Copa Sudamericana.

The season generally covers the period from 1 July 2019 to 30 June 2020.

== Review ==
=== Pre-season ===
Francisco González Metilli sealed his loan departure from Argentinos Juniors on 18 June 2019, as he penned terms with newly-promoted Primera B Nacional team Estudiantes (BA). They played Huracán in a friendly double-header on 26 June, losing the initial match 3–0 prior to winning the secondary encounter thanks to a goal from Iván Colman. Nahuel Rodríguez left on loan to Brown on 26 June, which preceded Gastón Bojanich going permanently to Barracas Central. Estudiantes (BA) were met in two pre-season matches on 29 June, with both encounters ending in 1–1 draws; Colman and youngster Lucas Ambrogio scored for them. Gastón Machín and Leonardo Pisculichi terminated their contracts in June, subsequently sealing moves to Segunda División B side Burgos.

Leonel Mosevich, just off a season on loan in Switzerland with FC St. Gallen, was loaned out again on 29 June - to Nacional of Portugal's LigaPro. A number of other players returned from their loan spells on and around 30 June, including Bautista Pavlovsky and Guillermo Benítez. As did the players loaned in. Santiago Silva, a Uruguayan centre-forward from Gimnasia y Esgrima, and Nicolás Silva, an Argentine right winger from Banfield, completed moves in on 1 July. Victorio Ramis, on loan from Godoy Cruz, did likewise soon after. Argentinos drew in an away friendly with Gimnasia y Esgrima on 3 July, before winning game two that day thanks to goals from Raúl Bobadilla and Elías Gómez. Right midfielder Diego Sosa switched Godoy Cruz for Argentinos on 6 July.

Gabriel Hauche and Elías Gómez netted in narrow exhibition match wins over Arsenal de Sarandí on 6 July. Left-back Mauro Maidana headed off to Mitre on 9 July.

=== July ===
Colón, also of the Primera División, were Argentinos' first competitive opponents of 2019–20, as they met in the first leg of a Copa Sudamericana knockout tie in Santa Fe on 11 July. Matías Romero subsequently netted the winner, as they earned a one-goal advantage for the second leg. Marcos Angeleri signed from Uruguayan outfit Nacional on 16 July. The second leg with Colón was played on 18 July, with their opponents running out one-nil winners; therefore taking the tie to penalties, which Colón won. Argentinos had an exhibition with Villa Dálmine on 20 July, losing both encounters at the Estadio Diego Armando Maradona. Reserve player Franco Marchetti went on loan to Flandria on 22 July. In their first Primera División match, Argentinos held River Plate to a 1–1 draw.

Argentinos confirmed the exit on loan of goalkeeper Federico Lanzillota on 29 July, as he headed to Chilean football with Palestino for five months. The temporary departures of Luca Falabella (Mitre) and Lucas Ferraz Vila (Fénix) were announced on 30 July.

=== August ===
Argentinos travelled to Aldosivi for match two of the 2019–20 league campaign on 3 August, with the fixture ending without goals. Enrique Javier Borja was loaned to Belgrano on 5 August. It was reported, on 14 August, that new signing Santiago Silva had been provisionally suspended after he had failed a drugs test back in April whilst with Gimnasia y Esgrima. Argentinos later revealed Silva was going through fertility treatment with his partner at the time of the test. Argentinos continued their undefeated start in the Primera División with a victory over Banfield on 16 August, with Gabriel Hauche grabbing the decisive goal. Argentinos fought San Martín in the Copa Argentina in Salta on 21 August, with El Bicho progressing on penalties at the Estadio Padre Ernesto Martearena.

Santiago Silva's ban from playing was lifted on 22 August, pending the outcome of the investigation. After no goals away to Aldosivi on matchday two, Argentinos again failed to convert as they drew with Huracán in Parque Patricios on 26 August. A goal from Marcos Angeleri helped Argentinos defeat Almagro in a friendly on 27 August. Academy graduate Matko Miljevic scored the club's winner in a narrow victory over Gimnasia y Esgrima on 31 August.

=== September ===
Leandro Paiva was loaned out to Mexico's Atlante on 5 September.

== Squad ==
Squad No.	Nationality	Name	Position(s)	Date of birth (age)	Signed from
Goalkeepers
12	Argentina	Lucas Chaves	GK	9 August 1995 (age 31)	Academy
33	Argentina	Leandro Finochietto	GK	25 April 1997 (age 29)	Academy
34	Argentina	Nicolás Forastiero	GK	15 July 1998 (age 28)	Academy
Defenders
2	Argentina	Miguel Ángel Torrén	CB	12 September 1988 (age 38)	Newell's Old Boys
3	Argentina	Enzo Ybañez	LB	29 August 1998 (age 28)	Academy
4	Argentina	Jonathan Galván	CB	25 June 1992 (age 34)	Colón
6	Argentina	Marcos Angeleri	CB	7 April 1983 (age 43)	Nacional
13	Argentina	Maximiliano Centurión	CB	20 February 1999 (age 27)	Academy
15	Uruguay	Jonathan Sandoval	RB	25 June 1987 (age 39)	Liverpool
16	Argentina	Carlos Quintana	CB	11 February 1988 (age 38)	Talleres
21	Argentina	Aaron Barquett	RB	9 March 1999 (age 27)	Academy
24	Argentina	Elías Gómez	LB	9 June 1994 (age 32)	Rosario Central (loan)
	Argentina	Guillermo Benítez	LB	8 December 1993 (age 32)	Academy
Midfielders
5	Argentina	Francis Mac Allister	RM	30 October 1995 (age 31)	Academy
8	Argentina	Iván Colman	CM	6 May 1995 (age 31)	Academy
10	Argentina	Damián Batallini	RM	24 June 1996 (age 30)	Academy
14	Argentina	Gabriel Florentín	MF	13 March 1999 (age 27)	Academy
17	Argentina	Franco Moyano	CM	13 September 1997 (age 29)	San Lorenzo (loan)
18	Argentina	Diego Sosa	RM	24 October 1991 (age 35)	Godoy Cruz
19	Argentina United States	Matko Miljevic	AM	9 May 2001 (age 25)	Academy
20	Argentina	Fausto Vera	CM	26 March 2000 (age 26)	Academy
22	Argentina	Franco Ibarra	MF	28 April 2001 (age 25)	Academy
26	Argentina	Matías Romero	CM	1 February 1996 (age 30)	Academy
30	Argentina	Fausto Montero	CM	22 October 1988 (age 38)	Independiente Rivadavia
31	Argentina	Ezequiel Ham	DM	10 March 1994 (age 32)	Academy
Forwards
7	Argentina	Victorio Ramis	CF	7 July 1994 (age 32)	Godoy Cruz (loan)
9	Uruguay	Santiago Silva	CF	9 December 1980 (age 45)	Gimnasia y Esgrima
11	Argentina	Francisco Ilarregui	RW	6 May 1997 (age 29)	Quilmes
23	Argentina	Gastón Verón	CF	23 April 2001 (age 25)	Academy
25	Paraguay	Raúl Bobadilla	CF	18 June 1987 (age 39)	Borussia Mönchengladbach
27	Argentina	Gabriel Hauche	LW	27 November 1986 (age 39)	Millonarios
28	Argentina	Nicolás Silva	RW	24 January 1990 (age 36)	Banfield
29	Argentina	Lucas Ambrogio	FW	14 July 1999 (age 27)	Academy
32	Argentina	Thomas Amilivia	CF	13 June 1998 (age 28)	Sportivo Italiano
	Argentina	Franco López	RW	1 April 1998 (age 28)	River Plate
	Argentina	Bautista Pavlovsky	CF	16 December 1997 (age 28)	Academy
	Argentina	Esteban Rueda	RW	28 January 1996 (age 30)	Academy
Out on loan					Loaned to
1	Argentina	Federico Lanzillota	GK	1 December 1992 (age 33)	Palestino
35	Uruguay	Leandro Paiva	AM	15 February 1994 (age 32)	Atlante
36	Paraguay	Enrique Javier Borja	CF	30 May 1995 (age 31)	Belgrano
	Argentina	Facundo Barboza	CM	31 July 1996 (age 30)	Godoy Cruz
	Argentina	Nahuel Barragán	FW	20 February 1996 (age 30)	Flandria
	Argentina	Luca Falabella	DF	10 March 1999 (age 27)	Mitre
	Argentina	Lucas Ferraz Vila	LW	18 February 1998 (age 28)	Fénix
	Argentina	Francisco González Metilli	RW	29 March 1997 (age 29)	Estudiantes (BA)
	Argentina	Kevin Mac Allister	RB	7 November 1997 (age 29)	Boca Juniors
	Argentina	Franco Marchetti	CM	25 April 1998 (age 28)	Flandria
	Argentina	Leonel Mosevich	CB	4 February 1997 (age 29)	Nacional
	Argentina	Nahuel Rodríguez	LM	18 March 1996 (age 30)	Brown

== Transfers ==
Domestic transfer windows:
3 July 2019 to 24 September 2019
20 January 2020 to 19 February 2020.

=== Transfers in ===
Date from	Position	Nationality	Name	From	Ref.
3 July 2019 (Note: Deal agreed on 1 July 2019)	CF	Uruguay	Santiago Silva	Gimnasia y Esgrima	
3 July 2019 (Note: Deal agreed on 1 July 2019)	RW	Argentina	Nicolás Silva	Banfield	
6 July 2019	RM	Argentina	Diego Sosa	Godoy Cruz	
16 July 2019	CB	Argentina	Marcos Angeleri	Nacional	

=== Transfers out ===
Date from	Position	Nationality	Name	To	Ref.
1 July 2019 (Note: Deal agreed on 24 June 2019)	RM	Argentina	Gastón Machín	Burgos	
1 July 2019 (Note: Deal agreed on 28 June 2019)	AM	Argentina	Leonardo Pisculichi	Burgos	
3 July 2019 (Note: Deal agreed on 26 June 2019)	CB	Argentina	Gastón Bojanich	Barracas Central	
9 July 2019	LB	Argentina	Mauro Maidana	Mitre	

=== Loans in ===
Start date	Position	Nationality	Name	From	End date	Ref.
3 July 2019 (Note: Deal agreed on 1 July 2019)	CF	Argentina	Victorio Ramis	Godoy Cruz	30 June 2020	

=== Loans out ===
Start date	Position	Nationality	Name	To	End date	Ref.
1 July 2019 (Note: Deal agreed on 29 June 2019)	CB	Argentina	Leonel Mosevich	Nacional	30 June 2020	
3 July 2019 (Note: Deal agreed on 18 June 2019)	RW	Argentina	Francisco González Metilli	Estudiantes (BA)	30 June 2020	
3 July 2019 (Note: Deal agreed on 26 June 2019)	LM	Argentina	Nahuel Rodríguez	Brown	30 June 2020	
22 July 2019	CM	Argentina	Franco Marchetti	Flandria	30 June 2020	
29 July 2019	GK	Argentina	Federico Lanzillota	Palestino	31 December 2019	
30 July 2019	DF	Argentina	Luca Falabella	Mitre	30 June 2020	
30 July 2019	LW	Argentina	Lucas Ferraz Vila	Fénix	30 June 2020	
5 August 2019	CF	Paraguay	Enrique Javier Borja	Belgrano	30 June 2020	
5 September 2019	AM	Uruguay	Leandro Paiva	Atlante	30 June 2020	

== Friendlies ==
=== Pre-season ===
Arsenal de Sarandí, on 11 June 2019, were the first club to be announced as a pre-season opponent for Argentinos Juniors, with the fixtures dated for 6 July. Further games with Huracán was set soon after. Argentinos' full pre-season fixture list was confirmed on 23 June, they added encounters with Estudiantes (BA) and Gimnasia y Esgrima. It was also noted that all matches would be closed to the public.

Win Draw Loss

26 June 2019 Friendly	Huracán	3–0	Argentinos Juniors	Buenos Aires, Argentina
	M. Bogado; J. Mendoza; L. Merolla	Argentinos Juniors; TyC Sports		Stadium: Estadio Tomás Adolfo Ducó; Attendance: 0 (Note: Behind closed doors.)

26 June 2019 Friendly	Huracán	0–1	Argentinos Juniors	Buenos Aires, Argentina
		Argentinos Juniors; IAM Noticias	I. Colman	Stadium: Estadio Tomás Adolfo Ducó; Attendance: 0 (Note: Behind closed doors.)

29 June 2019 Friendly	Argentinos Juniors	1–1	Estudiantes (BA)	Buenos Aires, Argentina
	L. Ambrogio		M. Gallegos	Stadium: Estadio Diego Armando Maradona; Attendance: 0 (Note: Behind closed doors.)

29 June 2019 Friendly	Argentinos Juniors	1–1	Estudiantes (BA)	Buenos Aires, Argentina
	I. Colman (pen.)		F. Agost	Stadium: Estadio Diego Armando Maradona; Attendance: 0 (Note: Behind closed doors.)

3 July 2019 Friendly	Gimnasia y Esgrima	1–1	Argentinos Juniors	La Plata, Argentina
	H. Tijanovich	Argentinos Juniors	N. Silva	Stadium: Estadio Juan Carmelo Zerillo; Attendance: 0 (Note: Behind closed doors.)

3 July 2019 Friendly	Gimnasia y Esgrima	1–2	Argentinos Juniors	La Plata, Argentina
	J. Vargas	Argentinos Juniors	R. Bobadilla; E. Gómez	Stadium: Estadio Juan Carmelo Zerillo; Attendance: 0 (Note: Behind closed doors.)

6 July 2019 Friendly	Argentinos Juniors	1–0	Arsenal de Sarandí	Buenos Aires, Argentina
	G. Hauche 25'	Argentinos Juniors; TyC Sports		Stadium: Estadio Diego Armando Maradona; Attendance: 0 (Note: Behind closed doors.)

6 July 2019 Friendly	Argentinos Juniors	1–0	Arsenal de Sarandí	Buenos Aires, Argentina
	E. Gómez 3' (pen.)	Argentinos Juniors; IAM Noticias		Stadium: Estadio Diego Armando Maradona; Attendance: 0 (Note: Behind closed doors.)

=== Mid-season ===
Villa Dálmine revealed a friendly, scheduled for 20 July, with them on 19 June. They were also set to meet Mitre, though the game was later cancelled. Argentinos would face Almagro on 27 August.

Win Draw Loss

13 July 2019 Friendly	Argentinos Juniors	Cancelled	Mitre	Buenos Aires, Argentina
				Stadium: Estadio Diego Armando Maradona; Attendance: 0 (Note: Behind closed doors.)

20 July 2019 Friendly	Argentinos Juniors	0–1	Villa Dálmine	Buenos Aires, Argentina
		Argentinos Juniors; Olé; 70 min. match	M. Ballini 45'	Stadium: Estadio Diego Armando Maradona; Attendance: 0 (Note: Behind closed doors.)

20 July 2019 Friendly	Argentinos Juniors	1–2	Villa Dálmine	Buenos Aires, Argentina
	E. Borja 6' (pen.)	Argentinos Juniors; Olé; 70 min. match	B. Orosco 36'; Á. Veliez 61'	Stadium: Estadio Diego Armando Maradona; Attendance: 0 (Note: Behind closed doors.)

27 August 2019 Friendly	Argentinos Juniors	1–0	Almagro	Buenos Aires, Argentina
	M. Angeleri	Argentinos Juniors; 70 min. match		Stadium: Estadio Diego Armando Maradona; Attendance: 0 (Note: Behind closed doors.)

== Competitions ==
=== Primera División ===
==== League table ====
Pos	Team	Pld	W	D	L	GF	GA	GD	Pts
3	Vélez Sarsfield	23	11	6	6	27	14	+13	39
4	Racing	23	9	12	2	28	23	+5	39
5	Argentinos Juniors	23	10	9	4	22	17	+5	39
6	Defensa y Justicia	23	10	6	7	26	18	+8	36
7	Lanús	23	9	9	5	32	29	+3	36

Source: AFA
Rules for classification: 1) points; 2) play-off (only if needed to decide championship); 3) goal difference; 4) goals scored; 5) head-to-head points; 6) head-to-head goal difference; 7) head-to-head goals scored.

==== Relegation table ====
Pos	Team	2017–18 Pts	2018–19 Pts	2019–20 Pts	Total Pts	Total Pld	Avg	Relegation
13	Unión	43	36	4	83	57	1.456	
14	Lanús	29	34	10	73	57	1.281	
15	Argentinos Juniors	41	22	9	72	57	1.263	
16	Estudiantes (LP)	36	29	6	71	57	1.246	
17	Aldosivi	—	33	4	37	30	1.233	

Source: AFA

==== Results summary ====
Overall								Home						Away					
Pld	W	D	L	GF	GA	GD	Pts	W	D	L	GF	GA	GD	W	D	L	GF	GA	GD
5	2	3	0	5	3	+2	9	2	1	0	5	3	+2	0	2	0	0	0	0

Last updated: 31 August 2019.
Source: Soccerway

==== Matches ====
The fixtures for the 2019–20 campaign were released on 10 July.

Win Draw Loss

27 July 2019 1	Argentinos Juniors	1–1	River Plate	Buenos Aires, Argentina
20:00 GMT-3	D. Batallini 19'	Argentinos Juniors; Infobae; Soccerway	J. Carrascal 85'	Stadium: Estadio Diego Armando Maradona; Referee: Fernando Rapallini (Argentina)

3 August 2019 2	Aldosivi	0–0	Argentinos Juniors	Mar del Plata, Argentina
13:15 GMT-3		Argentinos Juniors; Infobae; Soccerway		Stadium: Estadio José María Minella; Referee: Diego Abal (Argentina)

17 August 2019 3	Argentinos Juniors	3–2	Banfield	Buenos Aires, Argentina
19:00 GMT-3	D. Batallini 22'; L. Lollo 41' (o.g.); G. Hauche 70'	Argentinos Juniors; Infobae; Soccerway	S. Vittor 45+1'; A. Fontana 90'	Stadium: Estadio Diego Armando Maradona; Referee: Andrés Merlos (Argentina)

26 August 2019 4	Huracán	0–0	Argentinos Juniors	Buenos Aires, Argentina
21:10 GMT-3		Argentinos Juniors; Infobae; Soccerway		Stadium: Estadio Tomás Adolfo Ducó; Referee: Patricio Loustau (Argentina)

31 August 2019 5	Argentinos Juniors	1–0	Gimnasia y Esgrima	Buenos Aires, Argentina
13:15 GMT-3	M. Miljevic 11'	Argentinos Juniors; Infobae; Soccerway		Stadium: Estadio Diego Armando Maradona; Referee: Facundo Tello (Argentina)

6	Godoy Cruz	–	Argentinos Juniors	Mendoza, Argentina
				Stadium: Estadio Malvinas Argentinas

=== Copa Argentina ===
San Martín were revealed as Argentinos Juniors' opponents in the round of thirty-two of the Copa Argentina. They beat the Primera B Nacional outfit, which gave them a round of sixteen tie with Lanús.

Win Draw Loss

21 August 2019 R32	San Martín	0–0 (2–3 p)	Argentinos Juniors	Salta, Argentina
19:15 GMT-3		Argentinos Juniors; TyC Sports; Soccerway		Stadium: Estadio Padre Ernesto Martearena; Referee: Fernando Espinoza (Argentina)
	Penalties
	R. Moreira (penalty missed); L. Diarte (penalty scored); G. Lamardo (penalty scored); L. Pons (penalty missed); N. Castro (penalty missed); A. Luciatti (penalty missed)		F. Vera (penalty scored); M. Torrén (penalty scored); E. Gómez (penalty missed); G. Hauche (penalty missed); L. Chaves (penalty missed); C. Quintana (penalty scored)

7 September 2019 R16	Lanús	–	Argentinos Juniors	Sarandí, Argentina
17:10 GMT-3				Stadium: Estadio Julio Humberto Grondona

=== Copa de la Superliga ===
Win Draw Loss

	–
00:00 GMT-3

=== Copa Sudamericana ===
Argentinos Juniors were drawn to face domestic rivals Colón in the Copa Sudamericana round of sixteen, with the home and away ties set for July.

Win Draw Loss

11 July 2019 R16 L1	Colón	0–1	Argentinos Juniors	Santa Fe, Argentina
21:30 GMT-3		Argentinos Juniors; La Nación; Soccerway	M. Romero 38'	Stadium: Estadio Brigadier General Estanislao López; Referee: Esteban Ostojich (Uruguay)

18 July 2019 R16 L2	Argentinos Juniors	0–1 (1–1 agg.) (3–4 p)	Colón	Buenos Aires, Argentina
21:30 GMT-3		Argentinos Juniors; Infobae; Soccerway	C. Bernardi 70'	Stadium: Estadio Diego Armando Maradona; Referee: Anderson Daronco (Brazil)
	Penalties
	S. Silva (penalty missed); D. Batallini (penalty missed); F. Montero (penalty scored); G. Hauche (penalty scored); M. Torrén (penalty scored); F. Mac Allister (penalty missed); E. Ybañez (penalty missed)		G. Ortiz (penalty missed); M. Fritzler (penalty missed); T. Chancalay (penalty scored); R. Aliendro (penalty scored); L. Rodríguez (penalty scored); C. Bernardi (penalty missed); E. Olivera (penalty scored)

== Squad statistics ==
=== Appearances and goals ===
No.	Pos.	Nationality	Name	League		Cup		League Cup		Continental		Total		Discipline		Ref
No.	Pos.	Nationality	Name	Apps	Goals	Apps	Goals	Apps	Goals	Apps	Goals	Apps	Goals	Yellow card	Red card	Ref
1	GK	Argentina	Federico Lanzillota	0	0	0	0	0	0	0	0	0	0	0	0	
2	CB	Argentina	Miguel Ángel Torrén	5	0	1	0	0	0	2	0	8	0	3	0	
3	LB	Argentina	Enzo Ybañez	0	0	0	0	0	0	2	0	2	0	1	0	
4	CB	Argentina	Jonathan Galván	0	0	0	0	0	0	0	0	0	0	0	0	
5	RM	Argentina	Francis Mac Allister	5	0	0	0	0	0	0(2)	0	5(2)	0	2	0	
6	CB	Argentina	Marcos Angeleri	0(1)	0	0	0	0	0	0	0	0(1)	0	0	0	
7	CF	Argentina	Victorio Ramis	0(2)	0	0	0	0	0	2	0	2(2)	0	0	0	
8	CM	Argentina	Iván Colman	1	0	1	0	0	0	0	0	2	0	0	0	
9	CF	Uruguay	Santiago Silva	4	0	0	0	0	0	2	0	6	0	1	0	
10	RM	Argentina	Damián Batallini	3(1)	2	1	0	0	0	0(1)	0	4(2)	2	1	0	
11	RW	Argentina	Francisco Ilarregui	0	0	0	0	0	0	0	0	0	0	0	0	
12	GK	Argentina	Lucas Chaves	3	0	1	0	0	0	2	0	6	0	0	0	
13	CB	Argentina	Maximiliano Centurión	0	0	0	0	0	0	0	0	0	0	0	0	
14	MF	Argentina	Gabriel Florentín	0(3)	0	0	0	0	0	0	0	0(3)	0	0	0	
15	RB	Uruguay	Jonathan Sandoval	5	0	1	0	0	0	2	0	8	0	3	0	
16	CB	Argentina	Carlos Quintana	5	0	1	0	0	0	2	0	8	0	2	0	
17	CM	Argentina	Franco Moyano	4	0	1	0	0	0	2	0	7	0	0	0	
18	RM	Argentina	Diego Sosa	4(1)	0	1	0	0	0	0	0	5(1)	0	1	0	
19	AM	Argentina United States	Matko Miljevic	1(1)	1	0(1)	0	0	0	0(1)	0	1(3)	1	0	0	
20	CM	Argentina	Fausto Vera	1(1)	0	1	0	0	0	2	0	4(1)	0	2	0	
21	RB	Argentina	Aaron Barquett	0	0	0	0	0	0	0	0	0	0	0	0	
22	MF	Argentina	Franco Ibarra	0	0	0	0	0	0	0	0	0	0	0	0	
23	CF	Argentina	Gastón Verón	0	0	0	0	0	0	0	0	0	0	0	0	
24	LB	Argentina	Elías Gómez	5	0	1	0	0	0	0	0	6	0	1	0	
25	CF	Paraguay	Raúl Bobadilla	0	0	0	0	0	0	1	0	1	0	0	0	
26	CM	Argentina	Matías Romero	1(1)	0	0	0	0	0	1	1	2(1)	1	1	0	
27	LW	Argentina	Gabriel Hauche	4	1	1	0	0	0	2	0	7	1	2	0	
28	RW	Argentina	Nicolás Silva	2	0	0	0	0	0	0	0	2	0	0	0	
29	FW	Argentina	Lucas Ambrogio	0(1)	0	0	0	0	0	0	0	0(1)	0	0	0	
30	CM	Argentina	Fausto Montero	0(3)	0	0	0	0	0	0(2)	0	0(5)	0	0	0	
31	DM	Argentina	Ezequiel Ham	0	0	0	0	0	0	0	0	0	0	0	0	
32	CF	Argentina	Thomas Amilivia	0	0	0	0	0	0	0	0	0	0	0	0	
33	GK	Argentina	Leandro Finochietto	0	0	0	0	0	0	0	0	0	0	0	0	
34	GK	Argentina	Nicolás Forastiero	0	0	0	0	0	0	0	0	0	0	0	0	
35	AM	Uruguay	Leandro Paiva	0	0	0	0	0	0	0	0	0	0	0	0	
36	CF	Paraguay	Enrique Javier Borja	0	0	0	0	0	0	0	0	0	0	0	0	
–	FW	Argentina	Nahuel Barragán	0	0	0	0	0	0	0	0	0	0	0	0	
–	LB	Argentina	Guillermo Benítez	0	0	0	0	0	0	0	0	0	0	0	0	
–	CM	Argentina	Facundo Barboza	0	0	0	0	0	0	0	0	0	0	0	0	
–	DF	Argentina	Luca Falabella	0	0	0	0	0	0	0	0	0	0	0	0	
–	MF	Argentina	Lucas Ferraz Vila	0	0	0	0	0	0	0	0	0	0	0	0	
–	RW	Argentina	Francisco González Metilli	0	0	0	0	0	0	0	0	0	0	0	0	
–	RW	Argentina	Franco López	0	0	0	0	0	0	0	0	0	0	0	0	
–	RB	Argentina	Kevin Mac Allister	0	0	0(1)	0	0	0	0	0	0(1)	0	0	0	
–	CM	Argentina	Franco Marchetti	0	0	0	0	0	0	0	0	0	0	0	0	
–	CB	Argentina	Leonel Mosevich	0	0	0	0	0	0	0	0	0	0	0	0	
–	LM	Argentina	Nahuel Rodríguez	0	0	0	0	0	0	0	0	0	0	0	0	
–	CF	Argentina	Bautista Pavlovsky	0	0	0	0	0	0	0	0	0	0	0	0	
–	RW	Argentina	Esteban Rueda	0	0	0	0	0	0	0	0	0	0	0	0	
Own goals				—	0	—	0	—	0	—	0	—	0	—	—	—

Statistics accurate as of 31 August 2019.

=== Goalscorers ===
Rank	Pos	No.	Nat	Name	League	Cup	League Cup	Continental	Total	Ref
1	RM	11	Argentina	Damián Batallini	2	0	0	0	2	
2	CM	26	Argentina	Matías Romero	0	0	0	1	1	
2	LW	27	Argentina	Gabriel Hauche	1	0	0	0	1	
2	AM	19	Argentina United States	Matko Miljevic	1	0	0	0	1	
Own goals					1	0	0	0	1	
Totals					5	0	0	1	6	—
