= List of Argentine Primera División transfers summer 2018–19 =

This is a list of football transfers in the summer transfer window in the 2018–19 season of the Argentine Primera División.

== Aldosivi ==
In: Note: Flags indicate national team as defined under FIFA eligibility rules; some limited exceptions apply. Players may hold more than one non-FIFA nationality.

No.	Pos.	Nation	Player

Out: Note: Flags indicate national team as defined under FIFA eligibility rules; some limited exceptions apply. Players may hold more than one non-FIFA nationality.

No.	Pos.	Nation	Player
7	MF	(Argentina) ARG	Antonio Medina (to Boca Unidos)
9	FW	(Argentina) ARG	Fernando Telechea (to Santamarina)
—	DF	(Argentina) ARG	Alan Alegre (to Quilmes)

== Argentinos Juniors ==
In: Note: Flags indicate national team as defined under FIFA eligibility rules; some limited exceptions apply. Players may hold more than one non-FIFA nationality.

No.	Pos.	Nation	Player
—	DF	(Argentina) ARG	Elías Gómez (from Rosario Central)
—	MF	(Uruguay) URU	Leandro Paiva (from (Uruguay) Cerro)
—	FW	(Paraguay) PAR	Enrique Borja (from (Paraguay) General Díaz)
—	FW	(Argentina) ARG	Gabriel Hauche (from (Colombia) Millonarios)

Out: Note: Flags indicate national team as defined under FIFA eligibility rules; some limited exceptions apply. Players may hold more than one non-FIFA nationality.

No.	Pos.	Nation	Player
9	MF	(Argentina) ARG	Óscar Benítez (loan return to (Portugal) Benfica)

== Atlético Tucumán ==
In: Note: Flags indicate national team as defined under FIFA eligibility rules; some limited exceptions apply. Players may hold more than one non-FIFA nationality.

No.	Pos.	Nation	Player

Out: Note: Flags indicate national team as defined under FIFA eligibility rules; some limited exceptions apply. Players may hold more than one non-FIFA nationality.

No.	Pos.	Nation	Player

== Banfield ==
In: Note: Flags indicate national team as defined under FIFA eligibility rules; some limited exceptions apply. Players may hold more than one non-FIFA nationality.

No.	Pos.	Nation	Player

Out: Note: Flags indicate national team as defined under FIFA eligibility rules; some limited exceptions apply. Players may hold more than one non-FIFA nationality.

No.	Pos.	Nation	Player
6	DF	(Paraguay) PAR	Danilo Ortiz (loan return to Godoy Cruz)
23	MF	(Argentina) ARG	Enzo Kalinski (to Estudiantes)

== Belgrano ==
In: Note: Flags indicate national team as defined under FIFA eligibility rules; some limited exceptions apply. Players may hold more than one non-FIFA nationality.

No.	Pos.	Nation	Player
—	DF	(Argentina) ARG	Marcelo Herrera (on loan from Lanús)
—	MF	(Colombia) COL	Mauricio Cuero (on loan from (Mexico) Santos Laguna, previously on loan at (Paraguay) Olimpia)
—	MF	(Argentina) ARG	Marcos Rivadero (loan return from Gimnasia (M))
—	FW	(Argentina) ARG	Tobías Figueroa (loan return from (Chile) Unión Española)

Out: Note: Flags indicate national team as defined under FIFA eligibility rules; some limited exceptions apply. Players may hold more than one non-FIFA nationality.

No.	Pos.	Nation	Player
8	MF	(Argentina) ARG	Gastón Gil Romero (loan return to Estudiantes)
15	GK	(Argentina) ARG	Pablo Heredia (unattached)
20	MF	(Argentina) ARG	Jonás Aguirre (loan return to Rosario Central)
25	DF	(Argentina) ARG	Sebastián Olivarez (loan return to Godoy Cruz)
30	MF	(Argentina) ARG	Denis Rodríguez (loan return to Newell's Old Boys)

== Boca Juniors ==
In: Note: Flags indicate national team as defined under FIFA eligibility rules; some limited exceptions apply. Players may hold more than one non-FIFA nationality.

No.	Pos.	Nation	Player
6	DF	(Paraguay) PAR	Júnior Alonso (on loan from (France) Lille, previously on loan at (Spain) Celta)
12	GK	(Argentina) ARG	Marcos Díaz (from Huracán)
13	DF	(Argentina) ARG	Kevin Mac Allister (on loan from Argentinos Juniors)
20	DF	(Argentina) ARG	Lisandro López (on loan from (Portugal) Benfica)
23	MF	(Argentina) ARG	Iván Marcone (from (Mexico) Cruz Azul)
26	DF	(Argentina) ARG	Gastón Ávila (from Rosario Central)
27	MF	(Colombia) COL	Jorman Campuzano (from (Colombia) Atlético Nacional)
—	MF	(Argentina) ARG	Owen Blanco (from Sportivo Italiano)

Out: Note: Flags indicate national team as defined under FIFA eligibility rules; some limited exceptions apply. Players may hold more than one non-FIFA nationality.

No.	Pos.	Nation	Player
6	DF	(Argentina) ARG	Lisandro Magallán (to (Netherlands) Ajax)
8	MF	(Argentina) ARG	Pablo Pérez (on loan to Independiente)
10	MF	(Colombia) COL	Edwin Cardona (loan return to (Mexico) Monterrey)
11	FW	(Argentina) ARG	Cristian Espinoza (loan return to (Spain) Villarreal)
14	DF	(Argentina) ARG	Gino Peruzzi (to San Lorenzo)
16	MF	(Colombia) COL	Wilmar Barrios (to (Russia) Zenit)
20	DF	(Uruguay) URU	Lucas Olaza (on loan to (Spain) Celta)
21	DF	(Argentina) ARG	Agustín Heredia (on loan to Godoy Cruz)
26	DF	(Argentina) ARG	Leonardo Balerdi (to (Germany) Borussia Dortmund)
29	DF	(Argentina) ARG	Leonardo Jara (to (United States) D.C. United)
33	MF	(Argentina) ARG	Gonzalo Lamardo (on loan to San Martín (T))
35	GK	(Argentina) ARG	Federico Abadía (on loan to Talleres (C))
36	DF	(Argentina) ARG	Nahuel Molina (on loan to Rosario Central, previously on loan at Defensa y Justicia)
38	FW	(Argentina) ARG	Mateo Retegui (on loan to Estudiantes (LP))
—	GK	(Bolivia) BOL	Carlos Lampe (loan return to (Chile) Huachipato)
—	MF	(Argentina) ARG	Nicolás Colazo (on loan to Tigre, previously on loan at (Greece) Aris)
—	MF	(Argentina) ARG	Alexis Messidoro (on loan to (Uruguay) Cerro Largo, previously on loan at Talleres (C))
—	MF	(Colombia) COL	Sebastián Pérez (on loan to (Ecuador) Barcelona, previously on loan at (Mexico) Pachuca)
—	FW	(Argentina) ARG	Walter Bou (on loan to (Chile) La Calera, previously on loan at (Brazil) Vitória)
—	FW	(Argentina) ARG	Matías Roskopf (to (Romania) Hermannstadt, previously on loan at (Uruguay) Torque)

== Colón ==
In: Note: Flags indicate national team as defined under FIFA eligibility rules; some limited exceptions apply. Players may hold more than one non-FIFA nationality.

No.	Pos.	Nation	Player
—	MF	(Argentina) ARG	Gabriel Gudiño (on loan from San Lorenzo)

Out: Note: Flags indicate national team as defined under FIFA eligibility rules; some limited exceptions apply. Players may hold more than one non-FIFA nationality.

No.	Pos.	Nation	Player
10	MF	(Argentina) ARG	Alan Ruiz (loan return to (Portugal) Sporting CP)
11	FW	(Argentina) ARG	Javier Correa (to (Mexico) Santos Laguna)
15	MF	(Argentina) ARG	Mariano González (unattached)

== Defensa y Justicia ==
In: Note: Flags indicate national team as defined under FIFA eligibility rules; some limited exceptions apply. Players may hold more than one non-FIFA nationality.

No.	Pos.	Nation	Player
—	MF	(Argentina) ARG	José Fernández (from Rosario Central)
—	FW	(Argentina) ARG	Fernando Márquez (from (Malaysia) Johor Darul Ta'zim)

Out: Note: Flags indicate national team as defined under FIFA eligibility rules; some limited exceptions apply. Players may hold more than one non-FIFA nationality.

No.	Pos.	Nation	Player
2	DF	(Switzerland) SUI	Dylan Gissi (to Patronato)
9	FW	(Argentina) ARG	Fabián Bordagaray (to (Mexico) Sinaloa)
18	DF	(Argentina) ARG	Nahuel Molina (loan return to Boca Juniors)

== Estudiantes ==
In: Note: Flags indicate national team as defined under FIFA eligibility rules; some limited exceptions apply. Players may hold more than one non-FIFA nationality.

No.	Pos.	Nation	Player
—	MF	(Argentina) ARG	Enzo Kalinski (from Banfield)
—	FW	(Colombia) COL	Edwar López (from (Colombia) Huila)

Out: Note: Flags indicate national team as defined under FIFA eligibility rules; some limited exceptions apply. Players may hold more than one non-FIFA nationality.

No.	Pos.	Nation	Player
9	MF	(Argentina) ARG	Lucas Rodríguez (on loan to (United States) D.C. United)
26	MF	(Argentina) ARG	Matías Laba (to (Chile) Unión La Calera)
—	MF	(Argentina) ARG	Gastón Gil Romero (on loan to Patronato, previously on loan at Belgrano)

== Gimnasia ==
In: Note: Flags indicate national team as defined under FIFA eligibility rules; some limited exceptions apply. Players may hold more than one non-FIFA nationality.

No.	Pos.	Nation	Player
—	MF	(Peru) PER	Alexi Gómez (from (Peru) Universitario, previously on loan at (United States) Minnesota United)

Out: Note: Flags indicate national team as defined under FIFA eligibility rules; some limited exceptions apply. Players may hold more than one non-FIFA nationality.

No.	Pos.	Nation	Player
21	MF	(Argentina) ARG	Fabián Rinaudo (to Rosario Central)

== Godoy Cruz ==
In: Note: Flags indicate national team as defined under FIFA eligibility rules; some limited exceptions apply. Players may hold more than one non-FIFA nationality.

No.	Pos.	Nation	Player

Out: Note: Flags indicate national team as defined under FIFA eligibility rules; some limited exceptions apply. Players may hold more than one non-FIFA nationality.

No.	Pos.	Nation	Player
—	DF	(Argentina) ARG	Sebastián Olivarez (on loan to Ferro, previously on loan at Belgrano)
—	DF	(Paraguay) PAR	Danilo Ortiz (on loan to (Paraguay) Libertad, previously on loan at Banfield)

== Huracán ==
In: Note: Flags indicate national team as defined under FIFA eligibility rules; some limited exceptions apply. Players may hold more than one non-FIFA nationality.

No.	Pos.	Nation	Player

Out: Note: Flags indicate national team as defined under FIFA eligibility rules; some limited exceptions apply. Players may hold more than one non-FIFA nationality.

No.	Pos.	Nation	Player
1	GK	(Argentina) ARG	Marcos Díaz (unattached)

== Independiente ==
In: Note: Flags indicate national team as defined under FIFA eligibility rules; some limited exceptions apply. Players may hold more than one non-FIFA nationality.

No.	Pos.	Nation	Player

Out: Note: Flags indicate national team as defined under FIFA eligibility rules; some limited exceptions apply. Players may hold more than one non-FIFA nationality.

No.	Pos.	Nation	Player
8	MF	(Argentina) ARG	Maximiliano Meza (to (Mexico) Monterrey)
9	FW	(Argentina) ARG	Emmanuel Gigliotti (to (Mexico) Toluca)
11	FW	(Argentina) ARG	Leandro Fernández (to Vélez Sarsfield)

== Lanús ==
In: Note: Flags indicate national team as defined under FIFA eligibility rules; some limited exceptions apply. Players may hold more than one non-FIFA nationality.

No.	Pos.	Nation	Player
—	FW	(Argentina) ARG	José Sand (from (Colombia) Deportivo Cali)

Out: Note: Flags indicate national team as defined under FIFA eligibility rules; some limited exceptions apply. Players may hold more than one non-FIFA nationality.

No.	Pos.	Nation	Player
2	DF	(Argentina) ARG	Marcelo Herrera (on loan to Belgrano)

== Newell's Old Boys ==
In: Note: Flags indicate national team as defined under FIFA eligibility rules; some limited exceptions apply. Players may hold more than one non-FIFA nationality.

No.	Pos.	Nation	Player
—	DF	(Uruguay) URU	Ángelo Gabrielli (on loan from (Uruguay) Liverpool)
—	MF	(Colombia) COL	Reinaldo Lenis (on loan from (Brazil) Sport Recife, previously on loan at (Colombia) Atlético Nacional)
—	MF	(Argentina) ARG	Denis Rodríguez (loan return from Belgrano)
—	MF	(Argentina) ARG	Maxi Rodríguez (from (Uruguay) Peñarol)

Out: Note: Flags indicate national team as defined under FIFA eligibility rules; some limited exceptions apply. Players may hold more than one non-FIFA nationality.

No.	Pos.	Nation	Player
4	DF	(Paraguay) PAR	Iván Piris (to (Paraguay) Libertad)
—	DF	(Argentina) ARG	Milton Valenzuela (to (United States) Columbus Crew, previously on loan)

== Patronato ==
In: Note: Flags indicate national team as defined under FIFA eligibility rules; some limited exceptions apply. Players may hold more than one non-FIFA nationality.

No.	Pos.	Nation	Player
—	DF	(Switzerland) SUI	Dylan Gissi (from Defensa y Justicia)
—	MF	(Argentina) ARG	Gabriel Compagnucci (from Unión)
—	MF	(Argentina) ARG	Gastón Gil Romero (on loan from Estudiantes, previously on loan at Belgrano)
—	FW	(Argentina) ARG	Ignacio Cacheiro (from (Ecuador) Aucas)
—	FW	(Argentina) ARG	Germán Berterame (on loan from San Lorenzo)

Out: Note: Flags indicate national team as defined under FIFA eligibility rules; some limited exceptions apply. Players may hold more than one non-FIFA nationality.

No.	Pos.	Nation	Player
14	MF	(Argentina) ARG	Mauricio Sperduti (unattached)
31	FW	(Uruguay) URU	Facundo Barceló (loan return to (Uruguay) Juventud)

== Racing ==
In: Note: Flags indicate national team as defined under FIFA eligibility rules; some limited exceptions apply. Players may hold more than one non-FIFA nationality.

No.	Pos.	Nation	Player

Out: Note: Flags indicate national team as defined under FIFA eligibility rules; some limited exceptions apply. Players may hold more than one non-FIFA nationality.

No.	Pos.	Nation	Player
7	FW	(Argentina) ARG	Gustavo Bou (loan return to (Mexico) Tijuana)

== River Plate ==
In: Note: Flags indicate national team as defined under FIFA eligibility rules; some limited exceptions apply. Players may hold more than one non-FIFA nationality.

No.	Pos.	Nation	Player
—	GK	(Argentina) ARG	Augusto Batalla (loan return from Tigre)
—	MF	(Argentina) ARG	Tomás Andrade (loan return from (Brazil) Atlético Mineiro)

Out: Note: Flags indicate national team as defined under FIFA eligibility rules; some limited exceptions apply. Players may hold more than one non-FIFA nationality.

No.	Pos.	Nation	Player
10	MF	(Argentina) ARG	Pity Martínez (to (United States) Atlanta United)

== Rosario Central ==
In: Note: Flags indicate national team as defined under FIFA eligibility rules; some limited exceptions apply. Players may hold more than one non-FIFA nationality.

No.	Pos.	Nation	Player
—	GK	(Argentina) ARG	Diego Rodríguez (loan return from (Japan) JEF United Chiba)
—	MF	(Argentina) ARG	Jonás Aguirre (loan return from Belgrano)
—	MF	(Colombia) COL	Jarlan Barrera (on loan from (Mexico) UANL, previously at (Colombia) Junior)
—	MF	(Argentina) ARG	Fabián Rinaudo (from Gimnasia)

Out: Note: Flags indicate national team as defined under FIFA eligibility rules; some limited exceptions apply. Players may hold more than one non-FIFA nationality.

No.	Pos.	Nation	Player
3	DF	(Argentina) ARG	Elías Gómez (to Argentinos Juniors)
9	FW	(Argentina) ARG	Marco Ruben (unattached)
11	MF	(Argentina) ARG	José Fernández (to Defensa y Justicia)

== San Lorenzo ==
In: Note: Flags indicate national team as defined under FIFA eligibility rules; some limited exceptions apply. Players may hold more than one non-FIFA nationality.

No.	Pos.	Nation	Player
—	GK	(Argentina) ARG	Fernando Monetti (on loan from (Colombia) Atlético Nacional)
—	MF	(Colombia) COL	Raúl Loaiza (on loan from (Colombia) Atlético Nacional)
—	MF	(Colombia) COL	Gustavo Torres (on loan from (Colombia) Atlético Nacional)

Out: Note: Flags indicate national team as defined under FIFA eligibility rules; some limited exceptions apply. Players may hold more than one non-FIFA nationality.

No.	Pos.	Nation	Player
7	MF	(Argentina) ARG	Franco Mussis (unattached)
8	MF	(Argentina) ARG	Gabriel Gudiño (on loan to Colón)
23	FW	(Argentina) ARG	Germán Berterame (on loan to Patronato)
—	MF	(Argentina) ARG	Matías Vera (to (United States) Houston Dynamo, previously on loan at (Chile) O'Higgins)

== San Martín de San Juan ==
In: Note: Flags indicate national team as defined under FIFA eligibility rules; some limited exceptions apply. Players may hold more than one non-FIFA nationality.

No.	Pos.	Nation	Player

Out: Note: Flags indicate national team as defined under FIFA eligibility rules; some limited exceptions apply. Players may hold more than one non-FIFA nationality.

No.	Pos.	Nation	Player
11	FW	(Argentina) ARG	Pablo Magnín (unattached)
25	DF	(Argentina) ARG	Pablo Aguilar (unattached)

== San Martín de Tucumán ==
In: Note: Flags indicate national team as defined under FIFA eligibility rules; some limited exceptions apply. Players may hold more than one non-FIFA nationality.

No.	Pos.	Nation	Player

Out: Note: Flags indicate national team as defined under FIFA eligibility rules; some limited exceptions apply. Players may hold more than one non-FIFA nationality.

No.	Pos.	Nation	Player
6	MF	(Argentina) ARG	Matías Cahais (unattached)
14	FW	(Argentina) ARG	Fabián Espíndola (unattached)
16	MF	(Chile) CHI	Fernando Cordero (to (Chile) Universidad de Concepción)
19	FW	(Argentina) ARG	Marcos Figueroa (to (Chile) Cobresal)
22	GK	(Argentina) ARG	Ignacio Arce (unattached)
23	MF	(Uruguay) URU	Álvaro Fernández (unattached)
24	DF	(Uruguay) URU	Emiliano Albín (unattached)

== Talleres ==
In: Note: Flags indicate national team as defined under FIFA eligibility rules; some limited exceptions apply. Players may hold more than one non-FIFA nationality.

No.	Pos.	Nation	Player
—	MF	(Argentina) ARG	Sebastián Palacios (on loan from (Mexico) Pachuca)
—	FW	(Colombia) COL	Dayro Moreno (from (Colombia) Atlético Nacional)

Out: Note: Flags indicate national team as defined under FIFA eligibility rules; some limited exceptions apply. Players may hold more than one non-FIFA nationality.

No.	Pos.	Nation	Player
7	FW	(Argentina) ARG	Nahuel Bustos (on loan to (Mexico) Pachuca)
27	FW	(Paraguay) PAR	Brian Montenegro (loan return to (Paraguay) Olimpia)

== Tigre ==
In: Note: Flags indicate national team as defined under FIFA eligibility rules; some limited exceptions apply. Players may hold more than one non-FIFA nationality.

No.	Pos.	Nation	Player
—	DF	(Uruguay) URU	Gerardo Alcoba (from (Mexico) Santos Laguna)
—	FW	(Argentina) ARG	Lucas Janson (loan return from (Canada) Toronto)

Out: Note: Flags indicate national team as defined under FIFA eligibility rules; some limited exceptions apply. Players may hold more than one non-FIFA nationality.

No.	Pos.	Nation	Player
12	GK	(Argentina) ARG	Federico Crivelli (unattached)
19	FW	(Uruguay) URU	Diego Vera (unattached)
24	GK	(Argentina) ARG	Augusto Batalla (loan return to River Plate)
26	DF	(Argentina) ARG	Ezequiel Garré (unattached)
27	FW	(Uruguay) URU	Kevin Ramírez (loan return to (Uruguay) Nacional)

== Unión ==
In: Note: Flags indicate national team as defined under FIFA eligibility rules; some limited exceptions apply. Players may hold more than one non-FIFA nationality.

No.	Pos.	Nation	Player

Out: Note: Flags indicate national team as defined under FIFA eligibility rules; some limited exceptions apply. Players may hold more than one non-FIFA nationality.

No.	Pos.	Nation	Player
8	MF	(Argentina) ARG	Gabriel Compagnucci (to Patronato)
10	MF	(Argentina) ARG	Rodrigo Gómez (loan return to (Mexico) Toluca)
27	FW	(Argentina) ARG	Franco Soldano (to (Greece) Olympiacos)

== Vélez Sarsfield ==
In: Note: Flags indicate national team as defined under FIFA eligibility rules; some limited exceptions apply. Players may hold more than one non-FIFA nationality.

No.	Pos.	Nation	Player
—	MF	(Argentina) ARG	Yamil Asad (loan return from (United States) D.C. United)
—	FW	(Argentina) ARG	Leandro Fernández (from Independiente)

Out: Note: Flags indicate national team as defined under FIFA eligibility rules; some limited exceptions apply. Players may hold more than one non-FIFA nationality.

No.	Pos.	Nation	Player
