= Diego Sosa =

Diego Sosa may refer to:

- Diego Sosa (footballer, born 1980), Argentine defender for Club Social y Deportivo Flandria
- Diego Sosa (footballer, born 1991), Argentine midfielder for Godoy Cruz Antonio Tomba
- Diego Sosa (footballer, born 1997), Argentine defender for Club Atlético Tigre
