= Matías Romero (footballer) =

Argentine footballer (born 1996)

Personal information
- Full name: Matías Alexis Romero
- Date of birth: 1 February 1996 (age 30)
- Place of birth: San Miguel de Tucumán, Argentina
- Height: 1.78 m (5 ft 10 in)
- Positions: Midfielder; right winger

Team information
- Current team: Miami FC
- Number: 8

Youth career
- Boca Juniors
- Argentinos Juniors

Senior career*
Years	Team	Apps	(Gls)
2018–2021	Argentinos Juniors	67	(2)
2022–2023	Banfield	43	(0)
2023–2024	Instituto	12	(0)
2025–	Miami FC	57	(1)

International career
2013	Argentina U17	3	(0)
- * Club domestic league appearances and goals as of November 7, 2026

Matías Alexis Romero (born 1 February 1996) is an Argentine professional footballer who plays as a midfielder or right winger for Miami FC.

== Club career ==
Romero had a spell with Boca Juniors' youth system, prior to joining Argentinos Juniors. The 2018–19 Argentine Primera División season saw the club promote Romero into their senior squad, with manager Alfredo Berti awarding him his professional debut during an encounter with Gimnasia y Esgrima on 11 August 2018; coming off the bench for Fausto Montero in a 1–0 loss. In July 2019, Romero netted his first goal in a Copa Sudamericana first leg victory against Colón.

In the beginning of January 2022, Romero joined Banfield on a deal until the end of 2024.

== International career ==
Romero represented Argentina at U17 level, winning three caps at the 2013 South American U-17 Championship which Argentina ended as winners.

== Career statistics ==
As of 12 July 2019.

Club statistics
Club	Season	League			Cup		League Cup		Continental		Other		Total	
Club	Season	Division	Apps	Goals	Apps	Goals	Apps	Goals	Apps	Goals	Apps	Goals	Apps	Goals
Argentinos Juniors	2018–19	Primera División	20	0	1	0	8	0	4 (Note: Appearance(s) in the Copa Sudamericana)	0	0	0	33	0
Argentinos Juniors	2019–20	Primera División	0	0	0	0	0	0	1	1	0	0	1	1
Career total			20	0	1	0	8	0	5	1	0	0	34	1

== Honours ==
Argentina U17

- South American U-17 Championship: 2013
