= Alberione =

Alberione is an Italian surname. Notable people with the surname include:

- Agustín Alberione (born 1996), Argentine footballer
- James Alberione (1884–1971), Italian Catholic priest

== See also ==
- Alberoni (disambiguation)
