= Diego Maradona stadium =

Diego Maradona stadium may refer to:

- Estadio Diego Armando Maradona, home stadium of Argentinos Juniors in Buenos Aires, Argentina
- Stadio Diego Armando Maradona, home stadium of Napoli in Naples, Italy
