= Gabriel Florentín =

Argentine footballer (born 1999)

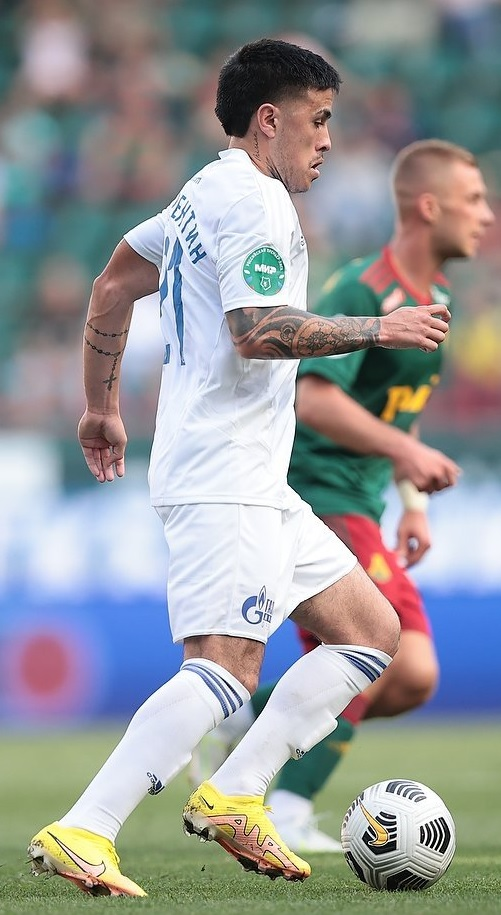
- Florentín with Orenburg in 2022

Personal information
- Full name: César Gabriel Florentín
- Date of birth: 13 March 1999 (age 27)
- Place of birth: Gregorio de Laferrère, Argentina
- Height: 1.73 m (5 ft 8 in)
- Position: Attacking midfielder

Team information
- Current team: Argentinos Juniors
- Number: 21

Youth career
- River Plate
- 2016–2019: Argentinos Juniors

Senior career*
Years	Team	Apps	(Gls)
2019–2022	Argentinos Juniors	63	(4)
2022–2025	Orenburg	48	(3)
2025–	Argentinos Juniors	9	(1)
- * Club domestic league appearances and goals as of 17:24, 10 July 2026 (UTC)

César Gabriel Florentín (born 13 March 1999) is an Argentine professional footballer who plays as an attacking midfielder for Argentinos Juniors.

== Career ==
Florentín came through the youth system of River Plate, prior to signing for Argentinos Juniors' ranks in 2016; making the breakthrough into the latter's first-team fold in 2019. He was initially an unused substitute four times in the Copa Sudamericana, across ties with Deportes Tolima and Colón. Florentín's professional debut arrived on 3 August 2019 versus Aldosivi, as he came off the bench to replace Nicolás Silva after seventy-three minutes of a goalless away draw. Eight more appearances came in 2019–20, which included his first start arriving in a Copa Sudamericana first stage tie with Sport Huancayo on 11 February 2020.

On 8 March 2021, Florentín scored for the first time as he netted a stoppage time winner away to ex-club River Plate in the Copa de la Liga Profesional.

On 2 August 2022, Florentín signed with Russian Premier League club FC Orenburg, where he joined his compatriots Braian Mansilla and Lucas Vera. In August 2024, he suffered an ACL tear and missed the remainder of the 2024–25 season. Florentín left Orenburg on 7 June 2025 as his contract expired.

In June 2025, Florentín returned to Argentinos Juniors, signing a contract until the end of 2029.

== Personal life ==
On 25 July 2020, Florentín tested positive for COVID-19 amid the pandemic; becoming the first Primera División player to do so.

== Career statistics ==
As of match played 10 August 2024.

Appearances and goals by club, season and competition
Club	Season	League			Cup		League Cup		Continental		Other		Total	
Club	Season	Division	Apps	Goals	Apps	Goals	Apps	Goals	Apps	Goals	Apps	Goals	Apps	Goals
Argentinos Juniors	2018–19	Argentine Primera División	0	0	0	0	0	0	0	0	0	0	0	0
Argentinos Juniors	2019–20	Argentine Primera División	5	0	2	0	1	0	1 (Note: Appearance(s) in the Copa Sudamericana)	0	0	0	9	0
Argentinos Juniors	2020–21 (Note: Soccerway counts 2020 Copa de la Liga Profesional appearances as league appearances.)	Argentine Primera División	6	0	0	0	0	0	0	0	0	0	6	0
Argentinos Juniors	2021 (Note: Soccerway counts 2021 Copa de la Liga Profesional appearances as league appearances.)	Argentine Primera División	33	3	0	0	0	0	8 (Note: Appearance(s) in the Copa Libertadores)	1	0	0	41	4
Argentinos Juniors	2021 (Note: Soccerway counts 2022 Copa de la Liga Profesional appearances as league appearances.)	Argentine Primera División	19	1	2	0	0	0	0	0	0	0	21	1
Argentinos Juniors	Total		63	4	4	0	1	0	9	1	0	0	77	5
Orenburg	2022–23	Russian Premier League	20	2	4	1	0	0	0	0	0	0	24	3
Orenburg	2023–24	Russian Premier League	24	1	6	1	0	0	0	0	0	0	30	2
Orenburg	2024–25	Russian Premier League	4	0	0	0	—		—		—		4	0
Orenburg	Total		48	3	10	2	0	0	0	0	0	0	58	5
Career total			111	7	14	2	1	0	9	1	0	0	135	10
