= Lautaro Mesa =

Argentine footballer

Personal information
- Full name: Lautaro Daniel Mesa
- Date of birth: 26 April 1997 (age 29)
- Place of birth: Ezeiza, Argentina
- Height: 1.75 m (5 ft 9 in)
- Position: Forward

Senior career*
Years	Team	Apps	(Gls)
2015–2018	Argentinos Juniors	4	(0)
2017–2018	→ Brown (loan)	18	(1)
2019	3 de Febrero		
- * Club domestic league appearances and goals

Lautaro Daniel Mesa (born 26 April 1997) is an Argentine professional footballer who plays as a forward.

== Career ==
Mesa made his professional debut for Argentine Primera División side Argentinos Juniors on 22 August 2015, he was substituted on for the final five minutes in a 2–3 defeat to San Lorenzo at the Estadio Diego Armando Maradona. In February 2016, Mesa signed a new three-year contract with the club. He went onto make four appearances in the 2016–17 season as Argentinos won the Primera B Nacional title. On 20 August 2017, Mesa joined Brown of Primera B Nacional on loan. His first match for Brown was a loss against Guillermo Brown. Mesa scored his first goal on 30 April 2018 versus San Martín.

In January 2019, Mesa completed a move to Paraguay with División Intermedia side 3 de Febrero.

== Career statistics ==
As of 25 September 2020.

Club statistics
Club	Season	League			Cup		Continental		Other		Total	
Club	Season	Division	Apps	Goals	Apps	Goals	Apps	Goals	Apps	Goals	Apps	Goals
Argentinos Juniors	2015	Primera División	1	0	0	0	—		0	0	1	0
Argentinos Juniors	2016	Primera División	0	0	0	0	—		0	0	0	0
Argentinos Juniors	2016–17	Primera B Nacional	3	0	1	0	—		0	0	4	0
Argentinos Juniors	2017–18	Primera División	0	0	0	0	—		0	0	0	0
Argentinos Juniors	2018–19	Primera División	0	0	0	0	0	0	0	0	0	0
Argentinos Juniors	Total		4	0	1	0	0	0	0	0	5	0
Brown (loan)	2017–18	Primera B Nacional	11	1	0	0	—		2 (Note: Appearance(s) in the Primera B Nacional play-offs)	0	13	1
Brown (loan)	2018–19	Primera B Nacional	7	0	0	0	—		0	0	7	0
Brown (loan)	Total		18	1	0	0	—		0	0	20	1
Career total			22	1	1	0	0	0	2	0	25	1
