= Ybáñez =

Ybáñez is a Basque surname. Notable people with the surname include:

- Enzo Ybañez (born 1998), Argentine footballer
- Warren Ybañez (born 1979), Filipino basketball player
- Zenaida Ybañez-Chavez (born 1970/1971), Filipina volleyball player

== See also ==
- Los Ybanez, a city in Dawson County, Texas, United States
- Sgt. Ernesto 'Boy' Ybañez: Tirtir Gang, a 1988 Filipino action film
