= Lucas Ambrogio =

Argentine footballer

Personal information
- Full name: Lucas Martín Ambrogio
- Date of birth: 14 July 1999 (age 27)
- Place of birth: Villa Mercedes, Argentina
- Height: 1.81 m (5 ft 11 in)
- Position: Forward

Team information
- Current team: Nueva Chicago (on loan from Argentinos Juniors)

Youth career
- Racing de Villa Mercedes
- 2017–2019: Argentinos Juniors

Senior career*
| Years | Team | Apps | (Gls) |
| 2019– | Argentinos Juniors | 8 | (0) |
| 2021–2022 | → Indep. Rivadavia (loan) | 51 | (12) |
| 2024 | → Atlético Tucumán (loan) | 4 | (0) |
| 2025 | → Atlanta (loan) | 35 | (3) |
| 2026– | → Nueva Chicago (loan) | 5 | (1) |
- * Club domestic league appearances and goals as of 17:18, 13 April 2026 (UTC)

Lucas Martín Ambrogio (born 14 July 1999) is an Argentine professional footballer who plays as a forward for Nueva Chicago, on loan from Argentinos Juniors.

== Career ==
Ambrogio played in the youth academy of Argentinos Juniors, having joined from Racing de Villa Mercedes in 2017. His breakthrough into senior football arrived at the beginning of 2019–20, as Diego Dabove selected the forward on the bench for a Primera División fixture with Banfield. Ambrogio subsequently appeared for his professional bow, replacing Damián Batallini for the final moments of a 3–2 win on 16 August 2019.

In August 2021, Ambrogio was loaned out to Independiente Rivadavia for the rest of 2021. In January 2022, the loan deal was extended until the end of 2022.

== Personal life ==
In August 2020, it was announced that Ambrogio had tested positive for COVID-19 amid the pandemic. It was later declared a false positive.

== Career statistics ==
As of 30 September 2020.

Appearances and goals by club, season and competition
| Club | Season | League | | | Cup | | League Cup | | Continental | | Other | | Total | |
| Club | Season | Division | Apps | Goals | Apps | Goals | Apps | Goals | Apps | Goals | Apps | Goals | Apps | Goals |
|---|---|---|---|---|---|---|---|---|---|---|---|---|---|---|
| Argentinos Juniors | 2019–20 | Primera División | 1 | 0 | 0 | 0 | 0 | 0 | 0 | 0 | 0 | 0 | 1 | 0 |
| Career total | | | 1 | 0 | 0 | 0 | 0 | 0 | 0 | 0 | 0 | 0 | 1 | 0 |
