= Nahuel Barragán =

Argentine professional footballer

Personal information
- Full name: Nahuel Milton Barragán
- Date of birth: 20 February 1996 (age 30)
- Place of birth: General Rodríguez, Argentina
- Position: Forward

Youth career
- 2006–2017: Argentinos Juniors

Senior career*
Years	Team	Apps	(Gls)
2017–2019	Argentinos Juniors	0	(0)
2018	→ Olimpo (loan)	0	(0)
2019	→ Flandria (loan)	11	(0)
- * Club domestic league appearances and goals as of 20:15, 2 January 2021 (UTC)

Nahuel Milton Barragán (born 20 February 1996) is an Argentine professional footballer who plays as a forward.

== Career ==
Barragán's career started with Argentinos Juniors, having joined them in 2006. He was an unused substitute once in their title-winning campaign of 2016–17 against Boca Unidos, as they won promotion to the Primera División. On 13 July 2018, Primera B Nacional side Olimpo loaned Barragán. However, he returned to his parent club five months later without featuring. In the succeeding January, Barragán agreed a loan move to Primera B Metropolitana's Flandria. Eleven appearances came in 2018–19, with his first match for the Jáuregui outfit coming in a four-goal victory on the road against All Boys on 29 January.

== Career statistics ==
As of 2 January 2021.

Appearances and goals by club, season and competition
Club	Season	League			Cup		League Cup		Continental		Other		Total	
Club	Season	Division	Apps	Goals	Apps	Goals	Apps	Goals	Apps	Goals	Apps	Goals	Apps	Goals
Argentinos Juniors	2016–17	Primera B Nacional	0	0	0	0	—		—		0	0	0	0
Argentinos Juniors	2017–18	Primera División	0	0	0	0	—		—		0	0	0	0
Argentinos Juniors	2018–19	Primera División	0	0	0	0	0	0	0	0	0	0	0	0
Argentinos Juniors	Total		0	0	0	0	0	0	0	0	0	0	0	0
Olimpo (loan)	2018–19	Primera B Nacional	0	0	0	0	—		—		0	0	0	0
Flandria (loan)	2018–19	Primera B Metropolitana	11	0	0	0	—		—		0	0	11	0
Career total			11	0	0	0	0	0	0	0	0	0	11	0
