= 2017–18 Argentinos Juniors season =

Argentinos Juniors
2017–18 season
- Chairman: Cristian Malaspina
- Manager: Alfredo Berti (from 4 August 2017)
- Stadium: Estadio Diego Armando Maradona
- Primera División: 12th
- Copa Argentina: Round of 16
- Top goalscorer: League: Two players (5); All: Two players (5)

The 2017–18 season is Argentinos Juniors' 1st season back in the top-flight of Argentine football, following promotion from Primera B Nacional in 2016–17. The season covers the period from 1 August 2017 to 30 June 2018.

== Current squad ==
As of 22 August 2017.

Note: Flags indicate national team as defined under FIFA eligibility rules; some limited exceptions apply. Players may hold more than one non-FIFA nationality.

No.	Pos.	Nation	Player
—	GK	ARG	Federico Lanzillotta
—	GK	ARG	Leandro Finochietto
—	GK	ARG	Lucas Chávez
—	GK	ARG	Maximiliano Cavallotti
—	DF	ARG	Agustín Alberione
—	DF	COL	Juan Camilo Saiz (on loan from Independiente Medellín)
—	DF	ARG	Enzo Ybañez
—	DF	ARG	Gonzalo Piovi
—	DF	ARG	Guillermo Benítez
—	DF	ARG	Joaquín Laso
—	DF	URU	Jonathan Sandoval
—	DF	ARG	Kevin Mac Allister
—	DF	ARG	Leonel Mosevich
—	DF	ARG	Miguel Ángel Torrén
—	DF	ARG	Nicolás Freire
—	DF	URU	Sebastián Martínez

No.	Pos.	Nation	Player
—	MF	ARG	Alexis Mac Allister
—	MF	ARG	Damián Batallini
—	MF	ARG	Esteban Rolón
—	MF	ARG	Ezequiel Ham
—	MF	ARG	Facundo Barboza
—	MF	ARG	Gastón Machín
—	MF	ARG	Ignacio Méndez
—	MF	ARG	Iván Colman
—	MF	ARG	Leonardo Pisculichi
—	MF	ARG	Nicolás González
—	FW	ARG	Braian Romero
—	FW	ARG	Esteban Rueda
—	FW	ARG	Fabricio Lenci
—	FW	URU	Javier Cabrera
—	FW	ARG	Jonathan Cañete
—	FW	ARG	Nahuel Barragán

=== Out on loan ===
Note: Flags indicate national team as defined under FIFA eligibility rules; some limited exceptions apply. Players may hold more than one non-FIFA nationality.

No.	Pos.	Nation	Player
—	MF	ARG	Francisco Solé (at Brown until 30 June 2018)
—	FW	ARG	Lucas Cano (at Felda United until 31 December 2017)
—	FW	ARG	Lautaro Mesa (at Brown until 30 June 2018)

== Transfers ==
=== In ===
Date	Pos.	Name	From	Fee
4 August 2017	MF	(Argentina) Leonardo Pisculichi	(Brazil) Vitória	Undisclosed
5 August 2017	GK	(Argentina) Maximiliano Cavallotti	(Argentina) Gimnasia y Esgrima	Undisclosed
16 August 2017	FW	(Argentina) Jonathan Cañete	(Argentina) Independiente	Undisclosed

=== Out ===
Date	Pos.	Name	To	Fee
10 August 2017	DF	(Argentina) Juan Sabia	(Argentina) Libertad	Undisclosed

=== Loan in ===
Date from	Date to	Pos.	Name	From
10 August 2017	30 June 2018	DF	(Colombia) Juan Camilo Saiz	(Colombia) Independiente Medellín

=== Loan out ===
Date from	Date to	Pos.	Name	To
15 August 2017	30 June 2018	MF	(Argentina) Francisco Solé	(Argentina) Brown
20 August 2017	30 June 2018	FW	(Argentina) Lautaro Mesa	(Argentina) Brown

== Friendlies ==
=== Pre-season ===
Win Draw Loss

26 August 2017 Friendly	Argentinos Juniors (Argentina)	–	(Argentina) Villa Dálmine	Buenos Aires, Argentina
10:00		Report

== Primera División ==
=== League table ===
Pos	Team	Pld	W	D	L	GF	GA	GD	Pts	Qualification
10	Unión	27	11	10	6	33	23	+10	43	Qualification for Copa Sudamericana first stage
11	Colón	27	11	8	8	32	22	+10	41	Qualification for Copa Sudamericana first stage
12	Argentinos Juniors	27	12	5	10	36	30	+6	41	Qualification for Copa Sudamericana first stage
13	Belgrano	27	10	10	7	29	28	+1	40	
14	Vélez Sarsfield	27	10	8	9	31	32	−1	38	

Source: AFA
Rules for classification: 1) points; 2) play-off (only if needed to decide championship); 3) goal difference; 4) goals scored; 5) head-to-head points; 6) head-to-head goal difference; 7) head-to-head goals scored.

=== Results by matchday ===
Matchday	1	2	3	4	5	6	7	8	9	10	11	12	13	14	15	16	17	18	19	20	21	22	23	24	25	26	27
Ground	H	A	H	A	H	A	H	A	H	A	H	A	H														
Result	W	L	L	D	W	W	W	L	L	L	D	W															
Position	12 (Note: After the postponement on Matchday 1, they were 18th.)	25	27	26	21	10	7	9	11	15	16	11															

Updated to match(es) played on 12 December 2017. Source: Soccerway
A = Away; H = Home; W = Win; D = Draw; L = Loss

8 October 2017 (Note: Match was originally scheduled for 28 August 2017 before being postponed.) 1	Argentinos Juniors (Argentina)	1–0	(Argentina) Chacarita Juniors	Buenos Aires, Argentina
16:00	N. González 27'	Report		Stadium: Estadio Diego Armando Maradona; Referee: Nicolás Lamolina (Argentina)

9 September 2017 2	Patronato (Argentina)	2–1	(Argentina) Argentinos Juniors	Paraná, Argentina
18:05	L. Márquez 37'; S. Ribas 74'	Report	B. Romero 12'	Stadium: Estadio Presbítero Bartolomé Grella; Referee: Juan Pompei (Argentina)

16 September 2017 3	Argentinos Juniors (Argentina)	1–2	(Argentina) Belgrano	Buenos Aires, Argentina
14:05	N. González 18'	Report	E. García 34'; C. Lema 47'	Stadium: Estadio Diego Armando Maradona; Referee: Hernán Mastrángelo (Argentina)

24 September 2017 4	River Plate (Argentina)	1–1	(Argentina) Argentinos Juniors	Buenos Aires, Argentina
18:05	G. Martínez 18' (pen.)	Report	N. González 37'	Stadium: Estadio Monumental Antonio Vespucio Liberti; Referee: Diego Abal (Argentina)

30 September 2017 5	Argentinos Juniors (Argentina)	2–0	(Argentina) Racing Club	Buenos Aires, Argentina
20:05	M. Quiroga 88'; L. Pisculichi 90+2'	Report		Stadium: Estadio Diego Armando Maradona; Referee: Mauro Vigliano (Argentina)

14 October 2017 6	Rosario Central (Argentina)	1–3	(Argentina) Argentinos Juniors	Rosario, Argentina
14:05	F. Zampedri 90+3'	Report	B. Romero 30', 82'; N. González 89'	Stadium: Estadio Gigante de Arroyito; Referee: Pablo Echavarría (Argentina)

27 October 2017 7	Argentinos Juniors (Argentina)	3–2	(Argentina) Arsenal de Sarandí	Buenos Aires, Argentina
21:05	J. Sandoval 32'; D. Batallini 37'; L. Pisculichi 82'	Report	F. Monteseirín 6'; Mosquito 17'	Stadium: Estadio Diego Armando Maradona; Referee: Ariel Penel (Argentina)

5 November 2017 8	Estudiantes (Argentina)	1–0	(Argentina) Argentinos Juniors	Quilmes, Argentina
14:05	J. Schunke 47'	Report		Stadium: Estadio Centenario Dr. José Luis Meiszner; Referee: Pablo Echavarría (Argentina)

17 November 2017 9	Argentinos Juniors (Argentina)	0–1	(Argentina) Colón	Buenos Aires, Argentina
17:00		Report	G. Ortiz 63'	Stadium: Estadio Diego Armando Maradona; Referee: Nicolás Lamolina (Argentina)

25 November 2017 10	San Lorenzo (Argentina)	1–0	(Argentina) Argentinos Juniors	Buenos Aires, Argentina
19:15	N. Blandi 10'	Report		Stadium: Estadio Pedro Bidegain; Referee: Hernán Mastrángelo (Argentina)

2 December 2017 11	Argentinos Juniors (Argentina)	2–2	(Argentina) Temperley	Buenos Aires, Argentina
17:00	L. Pisculichi 67'; N. González 75'	Report	J. Sánchez Sotelo 20'; R. De Ciancio 85'	Stadium: Estadio Diego Armando Maradona; Referee: Darío Herrera (Argentina)

9 December 2017 12	Banfield (Argentina)	2–3	(Argentina) Argentinos Juniors	Banfield, Argentina
17:00	J. Carranza 27', 59'	Report	B. Romero 6', 69'; J. Cabrera 32'	Stadium: Estadio Florencio Sola; Referee: Andrés Merlos (Argentina)

January 2018 13	Argentinos Juniors (Argentina)	–	(Argentina) San Martín	Buenos Aires, Argentina
		Report		Stadium: Estadio Diego Armando Maradona

== Copa Argentina ==
Win Draw Loss

–
