= Federico Lanzillotta =

Argentine footballer

Personal information
- Full name: Federico Vicente Lanzillotta
- Date of birth: 1 December 1992 (age 33)
- Place of birth: Aldo Bonzi, Argentina
- Height: 1.85 m (6 ft 1 in)
- Position: Goalkeeper

Team information
- Current team: Deportes La Serena

Senior career*
Years	Team	Apps	(Gls)
2013–2016	Nueva Chicago	11	(0)
2016–2025	Argentinos Juniors	126	(0)
2019–2021	→ Palestino (loan)	17	(0)
2024	→ Aucas (loan)	17	(0)
2025	→ Bolívar (loan)	6	(0)
2026–	Deportes La Serena	0	(0)
- * Club domestic league appearances and goals as of 2 January 2026

Federico Vicente Lanzillotta (born 1 December 1992) is an Argentine professional footballer who plays as a goalkeeper for Chilean club Deportes La Serena.

== Career ==
Lanzillotta started his career in 2013 with Nueva Chicago of Primera B Nacional, making his debut on 2 June 2013 versus Douglas Haig. He made two more appearances in 2012–13, prior to seven in the 2015 Argentine Primera División which turned out to be his last games for the club. In January 2016, Lanzillotta completed a move to Argentinos Juniors. His first match for Argentinos came in the Primera División in a 0–3 home defeat to Atlético Tucumán in March. The club won promotion in 2016–17, but prior to the start of the 2017–18 season he suffered a cruciate ligament injury which took him out of action for the next six months.

On 29 July 2019, Lanzillotta was loaned for five months to Chilean Primera División side Palestino. Just three appearances followed due to the goalkeeper experiencing a knee injury, which required surgery. Lanzillotta returned to Argentinos in early December, though would rejoin Palestino on fresh loan terms in January 2020; he joined for twelve months, whilst also renewing his contract until 30 June 2023 with his parent club. He wouldn't play for the Chileans until 14 November 2020, due to the aforementioned surgery and the COVID-19 pandemic, with fourteen appearances eventually arriving in 2020. He returned to Argentinos in February 2021.

In January 2026, Lanzillotta returned to Chile and joined Deportes La Serena.

== Career statistics ==
As of 19 February 2021.

Club statistics
Club	Season	League			Cup (Note: Includes the Copa Argentina)		League Cup		Continental		Other		Total	
Club	Season	Division	Apps	Goals	Apps	Goals	Apps	Goals	Apps	Goals	Apps	Goals	Apps	Goals
Nueva Chicago	2012–13	Primera B Nacional	3	0	0	0	—		—		0	0	3	0
Nueva Chicago	2013–14	Primera B Nacional	0	0	0	0	—		—		0	0	0	0
Nueva Chicago	2014	Primera B Nacional	0	0	0	0	—		—		0	0	0	0
Nueva Chicago	2015	Primera División	7	0	0	0	—		—		0	0	7	0
Nueva Chicago	Total		10	0	0	0	—		—		0	0	10	0
Argentinos Juniors	2016	Argentine Primera División	10	0	0	0	—		—		0	0	10	0
Argentinos Juniors	2016–17	Primera B Nacional	37	0	1	0	—		—		0	0	38	0
Argentinos Juniors	2017–18	Argentine Primera División	0	0	2	0	—		—		0	0	2	0
Argentinos Juniors	2018–19	Argentine Primera División	5	0	1	0	0	0	0	0	0	0	6	0
Argentinos Juniors	2019–20	Argentine Primera División	0	0	0	0	0	0	0	0	0	0	0	0
Argentinos Juniors	2020–21	Argentine Primera División	0	0	0	0	0	0	0	0	0	0	0	0
Argentinos Juniors	2021	Argentine Primera División	0	0	0	0	—		0	0	0	0	0	0
Argentinos Juniors	Total		52	0	4	0	0	0	0	0	0	0	56	0
Palestino (loan)	2019	Chilean Primera División	3	0	0	0	—		0	0	0	0	3	0
Palestino (loan)	2020	Chilean Primera División	14	0	0	0	—		0	0	0	0	14	0
Palestino (loan)	Total		17	0	0	0	—		0	0	0	0	17	0
Career total			79	0	4	0	0	0	0	0	0	0	83	0

== Honours ==
Argentinos Juniors

- Primera B Nacional: 2016–17
