= Jonathan Sandoval =

Uruguayan footballer (born 1987)

Personal information
- Full name: Jonathan Alexis Sandoval Rojas
- Date of birth: 25 June 1987 (age 39)
- Place of birth: Montevideo, Uruguay
- Height: 1.79 m (5 ft 10 in)
- Position: Right-back

Team information
- Current team: Graneros

Youth career
- River Plate

Senior career*
Years	Team	Apps	(Gls)
2006–2011	River Plate	16	(0)
2007–2008	→ Heredia (loan)	0	(0)
2008	→ Sud América (loan)	13	(6)
2009	→ Cerro Largo (loan)	12	(0)
2009	→ Rentistas (loan)	9	(2)
2011–2013	Montevideo Wanderers	60	(8)
2013–2016	Peñarol	22	(1)
2016	Liverpool	15	(0)
2016–2023	Argentinos Juniors	115	(8)
2022	→ Colón (loan)	9	(0)
2022	→ Atlético Tucumán (loan)	3	(0)
2023–2024	Racing de Montevideo	0	(0)
2024–	Graneros		
- * Club domestic league appearances and goals as of 7 December 2023

Jonathan Alexis Sandoval Rojas (born 25 June 1987) is a Uruguayan professional footballer who plays as a right-back for Argentine Liga Tucumana de Fútbol side Graneros.

== Career ==
Sandoval's senior career began in 2006 with Uruguayan Primera División side River Plate. He made fourteen appearances before being loaned out to Liga Nacional de Fútbol de Guatemala club Heredia. He failed to make an appearance prior to returning to River Plate. In 2008, Sandoval joined Sud América of the Uruguayan Segunda División on loan. He scored six times in thirteen appearances. 2009 saw Sandoval loaned out twice to Primera División club Cerro Largo and Segunda División club Rentistas. In total, for both, he made twenty-one appearances and scored twice. He made two final appearances for River Plate in 2010–11.

On 23 January 2011, Sandoval completed a permanent transfer to Montevideo Wanderers. He made his league debut on 5 February versus Nacional, while he scored his first two goals for Montevideo against El Tanque Sisley on 3 April. In three seasons with the team, Sandoval scored eight goals in sixty matches. He joined Peñarol in 2013 and made his debut against his former club, River Plate, in August. After twenty-two apps for Peñarol, Sandoval had a short spell with Liverpool in 2016 before joining Primera B Nacional side Argentinos Juniors later that year.

He scored on his Argentinos debut, getting their second goal in a 2–2 draw with San Martín. In that season, Sandoval participated in thirty Primera B Nacional fixtures and scored three goals as Argentinos won promotion to the Argentine Primera División by winning the 2016–17 title. He made his 200th career appearance on 26 February 2018 during a 2–0 loss against Talleres.

In January 2022, Sandoval was loaned out to Colón from Argentinos Juniors until the end of the year. However, the loan was cut short and Sandoval was instead loaned out to Atlético Tucumán on 12 June 2022, until the end of the year.

== Career statistics ==
As of 15 May 2018.

Club statistics
Club	Season	League			Cup (Note: Includes the Copa Argentina)		League Cup		Continental (Note: Includes the Copa Libertadores and Copa Sudamericana)		Other		Total	
Club	Season	Division	Apps	Goals	Apps	Goals	Apps	Goals	Apps	Goals	Apps	Goals	Apps	Goals
River Plate	2006–07	Uruguayan Primera División	14	0	—		—		—		0	0	14	0
River Plate	2007–08	Uruguayan Primera División	0	0	—		—		—		0	0	0	0
River Plate	2008–09	Uruguayan Primera División	0	0	—		—		0	0	0	0	0	0
River Plate	2009–10	Uruguayan Primera División	0	0	—		—		0	0	0	0	0	0
River Plate	2010–11	Uruguayan Primera División	2	0	—		—		1 (Note: One appearance in 2010 Copa Sudamericana)	0	0	0	3	0
River Plate	Total		16	0	—		—		1	0	0	0	17	0
Heredia (loan)	2007–08	Liga Nacional	0	0	—		—		—		0	0	0	0
Sud América (loan)	2008–09	Segunda División	13	6	—		—		—		0	0	13	6
Cerro Largo (loan)	2008–09	Uruguayan Primera División	12	0	—		—		—		0	0	12	0
Rentistas (loan)	2009–10	Segunda División	9	2	—		—		—		0	0	9	2
Montevideo Wanderers	2010–11	Uruguayan Primera División	14	3	—		—		—		0	0	14	3
Montevideo Wanderers	2011–12	Uruguayan Primera División	26	3	—		—		—		0	0	26	3
Montevideo Wanderers	2012–13	Uruguayan Primera División	20	2	—		—		—		0	0	20	2
Montevideo Wanderers	Total		60	8	—		—		—		0	0	60	8
Peñarol	2013–14	Uruguayan Primera División	10	0	—		—		4 (Note: One appearance in 2013 Copa Sudamericana, three appearances in 2014 Copa Libertadores)	0	0	0	14	0
Peñarol	2014–15	Uruguayan Primera División	11	1	—		—		1 (Note: One appearance in 2014 Copa Sudamericana)	0	0	0	12	1
Peñarol	2015–16	Uruguayan Primera División	1	0	—		—		—		0	0	1	0
Peñarol	Total		22	1	—		—		5	0	0	0	27	1
Liverpool	2015–16	Uruguayan Primera División	15	0	—		—		—		0	0	15	0
Argentinos Juniors	2016–17	Primera B Nacional	30	3	1	0	—		—		0	0	31	3
Argentinos Juniors	2017–18	Argentine Primera División	25	3	0	0	—		—		0	0	25	3
Argentinos Juniors	Total		55	6	1	0	—		—		0	0	56	6
Career total			202	23	1	0	—		6	0	0	0	209	23

== Honours ==
Peñarol

- Uruguayan Primera División: 2015–16

Argentinos Juniors

- Primera B Nacional: 2016–17
