= Facundo Barboza =

Argentine professional footballer

Personal information
- Full name: Facundo Matias Barboza
- Date of birth: 31 July 1996 (age 30)
- Place of birth: San Fernando, Argentina
- Height: 1.70 m (5 ft 7 in)
- Position: Midfielder

Youth career
- Argentinos Juniors

Senior career*
Years	Team	Apps	(Gls)
2016–2020	Argentinos Juniors	51	(3)
2019	→ Godoy Cruz (loan)	9	(0)
2020	→ Zacatepec (loan)	4	(0)
2021–2022	Comunicaciones	7	(0)
- * Club domestic league appearances and goals

Facundo Matias Barboza (born 31 July 1996) is an Argentine former professional footballer who played as a midfielder.

== Career ==
Barboza's career began with Argentinos Juniors in 2016, making his debut on 6 February in a league draw with Tigre. Three further appearances followed as Argentinos were relegated to Primera B Nacional. In Argentina's second tier, Barboza made thirty-two appearances and scored three goals; his first came against Douglas Haig in October 2016. Argentinos won the 2016–17 Primera B Nacional title, gaining an instant return to the Primera División. Barboza joined Godoy Cruz on loan on 28 January 2019. Twelve appearances followed, which included a Copa Libertadores debut versus Universidad de Concepción.

In January 2020, Barboza switched Argentina for Mexico as he was loaned to Ascenso MX side Zacatepec. He would appear four times, though just once as a starter; against Correcaminos UAT on 14 March.

== Career statistics ==
As of 18 July 2020.

Club statistics
Club	Season	League			Cup		League Cup		Continental		Other		Total	
Club	Season	Division	Apps	Goals	Apps	Goals	Apps	Goals	Apps	Goals	Apps	Goals	Apps	Goals
Argentinos Juniors	2016	Primera División	4	0	0	0	—		—		0	0	4	0
Argentinos Juniors	2016–17	Primera B Nacional	32	3	2	0	—		—		0	0	34	3
Argentinos Juniors	2017–18	Primera División	7	0	1	0	—		—		0	0	8	0
Argentinos Juniors	2018–19	Primera División	8	0	1	0	0	0	0	0	0	0	9	0
Argentinos Juniors	2019–20	Primera División	0	0	0	0	0	0	0	0	0	0	0	0
Argentinos Juniors	Total		51	3	4	0	0	0	0	0	0	0	55	3
Godoy Cruz (loan)	2018–19	Primera División	5	0	1	0	0	0	1 (Note: Appearance(s) in the Copa Libertadores)	0	0	0	7	0
Godoy Cruz (loan)	2019–20	Primera División	4	0	1	0	0	0	—		0	0	5	0
Godoy Cruz (loan)	Total		9	0	2	0	0	0	1	0	0	0	12	0
Zacatepec (loan)	2019–20	Ascenso MX	4	0	0	0	—		—		0	0	4	0
Career total			64	3	6	0	0	0	1	0	0	0	71	3

== Honours ==
Argentinos Juniors

- Primera B Nacional: 2016–17
