= Lucas Ferraz Vila =

Argentine professional footballer

Lucas Ferraz
Personal information
- Full name: Lucas Martín Ferraz Vila
- Date of birth: 18 February 1998 (age 28)
- Place of birth: Buenos Aires, Argentina
- Height: 1.66 m (5 ft 5 1/2 in)
- Position: Forward

Team information
- Current team: El Ejido (on loan from Argentinos Juniors)
- Number: 16

Youth career
- River Plate
- 2018–2019: Argentinos Juniors

Senior career*
Years	Team	Apps	(Gls)
2019–	Argentinos Juniors	2	(0)
2019–2020	→ Fénix (loan)	14	(1)
2020–	→ El Ejido (loan)	7	(0)

International career
- Argentina U15
- Argentina U17
- * Club domestic league appearances and goals as of 14 March 2021

Lucas Martín Ferraz Vila (born 18 February 1998) is an Argentine professional footballer who plays as a forward for El Ejido, on loan from Argentinos Juniors.

== Club career ==
Ferraz played for the youth sides of River Plate up until 2018, when the forward departed to join Argentinos Juniors' system. After spending the rest of the year with their academy, Ferraz featured in professional football for the first time on 28 January 2019 after coming off the substitutes bench in a Primera División defeat to Colón away from home. In July 2019, after one further game for Argentinos, Ferraz Vila departed on loan to Primera B Metropolitana with Fénix. His first appearance came in a defeat to Almirante Brown on 3 August, before the forward notched his first senior goal against Sacachispas in his next match.

On 2 September 2020, Ferraz was announced as a new loan signing for newly promoted Segunda División B team El Ejido in Spain.

== International career ==
Ferraz represented Argentina at U17 level whilst with River Plate, notably appearing for them at that level's South American Championship and FIFA World Cup in 2015; winning four caps in total, one of which came in the World Cup in Chile against Australia. He had also made appearances for the U15s at the 2013 South American Championship.

== Career statistics ==
As of 1 October 2020.

Club statistics
Club	Season	League			Cup		League Cup		Continental		Other		Total	
Club	Season	Division	Apps	Goals	Apps	Goals	Apps	Goals	Apps	Goals	Apps	Goals	Apps	Goals
Argentinos Juniors	2018–19	Primera División	2	0	0	0	0	0	0	0	0	0	2	0
Argentinos Juniors	2019–20	Primera División	0	0	0	0	0	0	0	0	0	0	0	0
Argentinos Juniors	2020–21	Primera División	0	0	0	0	0	0	—		0	0	0	0
Argentinos Juniors	Total		2	0	0	0	0	0	0	0	0	0	2	0
Fénix (loan)	2019–20	Primera B Metropolitana	14	1	0	0	—		—		0	0	14	1
El Ejido (loan)	2020–21	Segunda División B	0	0	0	0	—		—		0	0	0	0
Career total			16	1	0	0	0	0	0	0	0	0	16	1
