= Franco López (Argentine footballer) =

Argentine footballer

Personal information
- Full name: Franco Alexis López
- Date of birth: 1 April 1998 (age 28)
- Place of birth: Isidro Casanova, Argentina
- Height: 1.78 m (5 ft 10 in)
- Position: Winger

Team information
- Current team: Cañuelas

Youth career
- Sportivo Italiano
- –2015: River Plate

Senior career*
Years	Team	Apps	(Gls)
2015–2018	River Plate	2	(0)
2018	Argentinos Juniors	0	(0)
2019	→ Los Andes (loan)	2	(0)
2021	Metropolitan	2	(0)
2022	Cañuelas	3	(0)
- * Club domestic league appearances and goals as of 19:19, 21 January 2021 (UTC)

Franco Alexis López (born 1 April 1998), is an Argentine footballer.

== Club career ==
López is a youth exponent from River Plate. He made his league debut at 8 June 2015 against Club Olimpo in a 1–1 draw. He replaced Fernando Cavenaghi after 66 minutes.
