= Guillermo Benítez (footballer, born 1993) =

Argentine footballer

Personal information
- Full name: Ángel Guillermo Benítez
- Date of birth: 8 December 1993 (age 32)
- Place of birth: Buenos Aires, Argentina
- Height: 1.70 m (5 ft 7 in)
- Position: Left-back

Team information
- Current team: Cerro Porteño
- Number: 13

Youth career
- Argentinos Juniors

Senior career*
Years	Team	Apps	(Gls)
2013–2020	Argentinos Juniors	47	(0)
2014–2015	→ Estudiantes BA (loan)	51	(2)
2018–2020	→ Guaraní (loan)	45	(3)
2020–2024	Guaraní	49	(1)
2022–2024	→ Huracán (loan)	64	(0)
2025–	Cerro Porteño	17	(0)
- * Club domestic league appearances and goals as of 12 August 2025

Ángel Guillermo Benítez (born 8 December 1993) is an Argentine-born Paraguayan professional footballer who plays as a left-back for Cerro Porteño.

== Career ==
Benítez is the son of Paraguayan immigrants, so he has dual citizenship (Paraguayan and Argentinian). Benítez made his Argentinos Juniors debut in 2013 in a Copa Argentina tie against Sportivo Belgrano, playing the full match in penalty shoot-out defeat. In June 2014, Benítez joined Primera B Metropolitana side Estudiantes on loan for two seasons. His first professional league appearance came on 8 August in a 1–0 win over Deportivo Merlo. He went onto play eleven times for Estudiantes during the 2014 campaign, prior to featuring in forty fixtures in 2015. In May 2015, Benítez scored his first career goal versus Deportivo Armenio. He made his Argentine Primera División debut for Argentinos on 6 February 2016 in a draw with Tigre.

After getting relegated in that season, he subsequently played thirty-six times for the club in the 2016–17 Primera B Nacional season as Argentinos won the title and gained promotion. His 100th career appearance arrived on 28 January 2018 in a 2–0 win versus San Martín. Benítez departed Argentine football for the opening time in June 2018, after being loaned to Guaraní of the Paraguayan Primera División. He remained on loan until May 2020, when he was signed permanently by the club he had made forty-five appearances for in the previous two years. In December, Benítez signed a new contract through to 2024. On 30 June 2022, Benítez returned to Argentina, as he signed on loan for Huracán until June 2023 with a purchase option of $300,000.

== Career statistics ==
As of 16 December 2020.

Club statistics
Club	Season	League			Cup		League Cup		Continental		Other		Total	
Club	Season	Division	Apps	Goals	Apps	Goals	Apps	Goals	Apps	Goals	Apps	Goals	Apps	Goals
Argentinos Juniors	2012–13	Argentine Primera División	0	0	1	0	—		—		0	0	1	0
Argentinos Juniors	2013–14	Argentine Primera División	0	0	0	0	—		—		0	0	0	0
Argentinos Juniors	2014	Primera B Nacional	0	0	0	0	—		—		0	0	0	0
Argentinos Juniors	2015	Argentine Primera División	0	0	0	0	—		—		0	0	0	0
Argentinos Juniors	2016	Argentine Primera División	5	0	0	0	—		—		0	0	5	0
Argentinos Juniors	2016–17	Primera B Nacional	36	0	1	0	—		—		0	0	37	0
Argentinos Juniors	2017–18	Argentine Primera División	6	0	1	0	—		—		0	0	7	0
Argentinos Juniors	2018–19	Argentine Primera División	0	0	0	0	—		0	0	0	0	0	0
Argentinos Juniors	2019–20	Argentine Primera División	0	0	0	0	—		0	0	0	0	0	0
Argentinos Juniors	Total		47	0	3	0	—		0	0	0	0	50	0
Estudiantes (loan)	2014	Primera B Metropolitana	11	0	1	0	—		—		0	0	12	0
Estudiantes (loan)	2015	Primera B Metropolitana	40	2	3	0	—		—		0	0	43	2
Estudiantes (loan)	Total		51	2	4	0	—		—		0	0	55	2
Guaraní (loan)	2018	Paraguayan Primera División	13	1	0	0	—		0	0	0	0	13	1
Guaraní (loan)	2019	Paraguayan Primera División	31	2	0	0	—		2 (Note: Appearance(s) in the Copa Sudamericana)	0	0	0	33	2
Guaraní	2020	Paraguayan Primera División	16	0	0	0	—		11 (Note: Appearance(s) in the Copa Libertadores)	0	0	0	27	0
Guaraní	Total		60	3	0	0	—		13	0	0	0	73	3
Career total			162	3	7	0	—		13	0	0	0	182	3

== Honours ==
Argentinos Juniors

- Primera B Nacional: 2016–17
