= Francisco Ilarregui =

Argentine footballer

Personal information
- Date of birth: 6 May 1997 (age 29)
- Place of birth: Curuzú Cuatiá, Argentina
- Height: 1.70 m (5 ft 7 in)
- Position: Forward

Team information
- Current team: Defensores (on loan from Argentinos Juniors)

Youth career
- Quilmes

Senior career*
Years	Team	Apps	(Gls)
2014–2018	Quilmes	32	(3)
2018–	Argentinos Juniors	6	(1)
2020–2021	→ Quilmes (loan)	7	(3)
2021	→ Platense (loan)	2	(0)
2021–	→ Defensores (loan)	26	(2)
- * Club domestic league appearances and goals as of 16:36, 14 July 2022 (UTC)

Francisco Ilarregui (born 6 May 1997) is an Argentine professional footballer who plays as a forward for Defensores de Belgrano, on loan from Argentinos Juniors.

== Career ==
Ilarregui's first senior career club became Quilmes in 2014. He made his professional debut in the Argentine Primera División against Arsenal de Sarandí on 8 September, prior to scoring his first goal three appearances later versus Vélez Sarsfield; which was his first career start. Seven more appearances followed across the following three campaigns in all competitions, prior to experiencing his breakthrough campaign after featuring twenty-two times and netting two goals during the 2017–18 Primera B Nacional season.

In June 2018, Alcobendas Sport of Spain's Tercera División agreed terms with Quilmes for Ilarregui. However, the transfer stalled after the Spanish side failed to present a secondary payment to Quilmes in order to complete the transaction. On 7 August, Argentine Primera División team Argentinos Juniors announced a loan deal had been reached for Ilarregui. However, that was questioned in a statement by Quilmes hours later. Finally, on 9 August, Argentinos announced that a permanent transfer had been agreed with Quilmes; with Ilarregui signing a three-year contract. He made his debut on 21 August against Unión Santa Fe.

In January 2020, following one goal (versus Tigre) in six appearances for Argentinos, Ilarregui was loaned out to Primera B Nacional with former club Quilmes until June 2021. However, the loan spell was terminated halfway through due to lack of playing time, at Ilarregui was instead loaned out to Platense in February 2022 until the end of June. In July 2021, he moved to Defensores de Belgrano on loan until the end of 2022.

== Career statistics ==
As of 27 August 2020.

Club statistics
Club	Season	League			Cup		League Cup		Continental		Other		Total	
Club	Season	Division	Apps	Goals	Apps	Goals	Apps	Goals	Apps	Goals	Apps	Goals	Apps	Goals
Quilmes	2014	Primera División	4	1	0	0	—		—		0	0	4	1
Quilmes	2015	Primera División	1	0	0	0	—		—		0	0	1	0
Quilmes	2016	Primera División	0	0	0	0	—		—		0	0	0	0
Quilmes	2016–17	Primera División	5	0	1	0	—		—		0	0	6	0
Quilmes	2017–18	Primera B Nacional	22	2	0	0	—		—		0	0	22	2
Quilmes	Total		32	3	1	0	—		—		0	0	33	3
Argentinos Juniors	2018–19	Primera División	6	1	0	0	0	0	0	0	0	0	6	1
Argentinos Juniors	2019–20	Primera División	0	0	0	0	0	0	0	0	0	0	0	0
Argentinos Juniors	Total		6	1	0	0	0	0	0	0	0	0	6	1
Quilmes (loan)	2019–20	Primera B Nacional	1	0	0	0	—		—		0	0	1	0
Career total			39	4	1	0	0	0	0	0	0	0	40	4
