= Leandro Paiva =

Uruguayan footballer (born 1994)

Personal information
- Full name: Leandro Gastón Paiva Santurión
- Date of birth: 15 February 1994 (age 32)
- Place of birth: Montevideo, Uruguay
- Height: 1.62 m (5 ft 4 in)
- Position: Attacking midfielder

Team information
- Current team: Sacachispas

Youth career
- Club Cohami
- Montevideo Wanderers

Senior career*
Years	Team	Apps	(Gls)
2013–2015	Montevideo Wanderers	30	(0)
2016	Oriental	7	(1)
2016–2017	Deportivo Maldonado	29	(4)
2018	Cerro	34	(8)
2019–2021	Argentinos Juniors	2	(0)
2019–2020	→ Atlante (loan)	10	(1)
2020	→ Cerro (loan)	17	(3)
2021	Rentistas	17	(0)
2022	Central Español	24	(5)
2023	Albion	7	(0)
2024	Bella Vista		
2024–	Sacachispas		
- * Club domestic league appearances and goals as of 29 November 2024

Leandro Gastón Paiva Santurión (born 15 February 1994) is a Uruguayan professional footballer who plays as an attacking midfielder for Guatemalan club Sacachispas.

== Career ==
Paiva's had youth stints with Club Cohami and Montevideo Wanderers. He made his professional bow in the Uruguayan Primera División on 11 May 2013, featuring for the final moments of a home victory over Liverpool; he had previously been an unused substitute earlier that month against Racing Club. In total, he made thirty appearances across four seasons with Montevideo Wanderers. February 2016 saw Oriental of the Uruguayan Segunda División sign Paiva. He netted his first senior goal in his final match on 11 June versus Huracán. A move to Deportivo Maldonado was completed in July. Four goals in thirty-one followed.

On 8 January 2018, Paiva joined top-flight outfit Cerro. His stint with the club lasted twelve months, with the midfielder participating in thirty-six fixtures in all competitions whilst scoring nine goals; including a brace in the Primera División over Progreso and one in a Copa Sudamericana second stage encounter against Bahia. At the conclusion of the year, in December, Paiva departed Uruguayan football to play in Argentina with Argentinos Juniors. He scored on his debut, netting in a Copa Argentina win over Douglas Haig on 5 March 2019. A total of eight games came for him within his first nine months with the Buenos Aires team.

Paiva left Argentinos on loan in September to Ascenso MX's Atlante.

== Career statistics ==
As of 5 September 2019.

Club statistics
Club	Season	League			Cup		League Cup		Continental		Other		Total	
Club	Season	Division	Apps	Goals	Apps	Goals	Apps	Goals	Apps	Goals	Apps	Goals	Apps	Goals
Montevideo Wanderers	2012–13	Uruguayan Primera División	2	0	—		—		—		0	0	2	0
Montevideo Wanderers	2013–14	Uruguayan Primera División	9	0	—		—		0	0	0	0	9	0
Montevideo Wanderers	2014–15	Uruguayan Primera División	16	0	—		—		0	0	0	0	16	0
Montevideo Wanderers	2015–16	Uruguayan Primera División	3	0	—		—		—		0	0	3	0
Montevideo Wanderers	Total		30	0	—		—		0	0	0	0	30	0
Oriental	2015–16	Segunda División	7	1	—		—		—		0	0	7	1
Deportivo Maldonado	2016	Segunda División	5	0	—		—		—		0	0	5	0
Deportivo Maldonado	2017	Segunda División	24	4	—		—		—		2 (Note: Appearance(s) in the Segunda División play-offs)	0	26	4
Deportivo Maldonado	Total		29	4	—		—		—		2	0	31	4
Cerro	2018	Uruguayan Primera División	34	8	—		—		2 (Note: Appearance(s) in the Copa Sudamericana)	1	0	0	36	9
Argentinos Juniors	2018–19	Argentine Primera División	2	0	1	1	2	0	3	0	0	0	8	1
Argentinos Juniors	2019–20	Argentine Primera División	0	0	0	0	0	0	0	0	0	0	0	0
Argentinos Juniors	Total		2	0	1	1	2	0	3	0	0	0	8	1
Atlante (loan)	2019–20	Ascenso MX	0	0	0	0	—		—		0	0	0	0
Career total			102	13	1	1	4	1	5	0	0	0	112	15
