= Fausto Montero =

Argentine footballer

Personal information
- Full name: Fausto Emanuel Montero
- Date of birth: 22 October 1988 (age 38)
- Place of birth: Paraná, Argentina
- Height: 1.78 m (5 ft 10 in)
- Position: Midfielder

Team information
- Current team: Deportivo Maipú

Senior career*
Years	Team	Apps	(Gls)
2009–2016	Unión Santa Fe	129	(9)
2013–2014	→ Arsenal de Sarandí (loan)	9	(0)
2016–2017	Independiente Rivadavia	34	(0)
2017–2020	Argentinos Juniors	45	(0)
2021–2022	Sarmiento	8	(0)
2022–2025	Deportivo Maipú	106	(10)
2025–2026	Atlanta	22	(0)
2026–	Deportivo Maipú	8	(0)
- * Club domestic league appearances and goals as of 17:21, 27 April 2026 (UTC)

Fausto Emanuel Montero (born 22 October 1988) is an Argentine professional footballer who plays as a midfielder for Deportivo Maipú.

== Career ==
Unión Santa Fe was Montero's first senior career club, who he began featuring for in the 2008–09 Primera B Nacional season. Aldosivi were the opponents in his debut appearance, Montero was subbed on for the final minutes of a 0–3 victory. In his fourth league match for Unión Santa Fe, Montero scored for the first time during a Primera B Nacional fixture with Deportivo Merlo. In total, he made ninety-nine appearances and scored eight goals in his first five seasons with the club. In July 2013, Montero joined Arsenal de Sarandí on loan. Twelve appearances followed in all competitions.

He returned to Unión Santa Fe for 2014 and 2015, prior to departing to sign for Primera B Nacional's Independiente Rivadavia on 1 August 2016. He was subsequently selected in thirty-four matches by managers Martín Astudillo and Alfredo Berti; the latter leading them to a fourth-place finish. Argentine Primera División side Argentinos Juniors completed the signing of Montero ahead of the 2017–18 campaign. He made his Argentinos Juniors debut against River Plate on 24 September 2017, which was followed by his 200th career appearance eight months later versus Vélez Sarsfield.

== Career statistics ==
As of 2 October 2018.

Club statistics
Club	Season	League			Cup (Note: Includes the Copa Argentina)		League Cup		Continental (Note: Includes the Copa Libertadores)		Other		Total	
Club	Season	Division	Apps	Goals	Apps	Goals	Apps	Goals	Apps	Goals	Apps	Goals	Apps	Goals
Unión Santa Fe	2008–09	Primera B Nacional	1	0	0	0	—		—		0	0	1	0
Unión Santa Fe	2009–10	Primera B Nacional	9	1	0	0	—		—		0	0	9	1
Unión Santa Fe	2010–11	Primera B Nacional	35	5	0	0	—		—		0	0	35	5
Unión Santa Fe	2011–12	Primera División	28	2	1	0	—		—		0	0	29	2
Unión Santa Fe	2012–13	Primera División	25	0	0	0	—		—		0	0	25	0
Unión Santa Fe	2013–14	Primera División	0	0	0	0	—		—		0	0	0	0
Unión Santa Fe	2014	Primera B Nacional	16	0	0	0	—		—		0	0	16	0
Unión Santa Fe	2015	Primera División	15	1	1	0	—		—		0	0	16	1
Unión Santa Fe	2016	Primera División	0	0	0	0	—		—		0	0	0	0
Unión Santa Fe	Total		129	9	2	0	—		—		0	0	131	9
Arsenal de Sarandí (loan)	2013–14	Primera División	9	0	1	0	—		2 (Note: Two appearances in the 2014 Copa Libertadores)	0	0	0	12	0
Independiente Rivadavia	2016–17	Primera B Nacional	34	0	1	0	—		—		0	0	35	0
Argentinos Juniors	2017–18	Primera División	21	0	1	0	—		—		0	0	22	0
Argentinos Juniors	2018–19	Primera División	4	0	1	0	—		—		0	0	5	0
Argentinos Juniors	Total		25	0	2	0	—		—		0	0	27	0
Career total			197	9	6	0	—		2	0	0	0	205	9

== Honours ==
Arsenal de Sarandí

- Copa Argentina: 2012–13
