= Agustín Alberione =

Argentine footballer

Personal information
- Date of birth: 10 August 1996 (age 30)
- Place of birth: Piamonte, Argentina
- Height: 1.81 m (5 ft 11 in)
- Position: Defender

Youth career
- Unión Santa Fe
- 2012–2017: Argentinos Juniors

Senior career*
Years	Team	Apps	(Gls)
2017–2019	Argentinos Juniors	2	(0)
2018	→ Independiente Rivadavia (loan)	3	(0)
2019	Deportivo Maldonado	0	(0)
- * Club domestic league appearances and goals

Agustín Alberione (born 10 August 1996) is an Argentine professional footballer who plays as a defender.

== Career ==
Alberione spent time in the youth ranks of Unión Santa Fe, prior to leaving in 2012 to join Argentinos Juniors. He was promoted into the club's first-team in June 2017 for a Primera B Nacional match with Boca Unidos, he subsequently played the final twenty-five minutes for his professional debut. Another appearance followed a month later versus Nueva Chicago, in a season which ended with Argentinos winning the 2016–17 Primera B Nacional. On 31 January 2018, Alberione joined Independiente Rivadavia of Primera B Nacional on loan. He terminated his loan in March after three appearances.

In January 2019, Alberione's contract with Argentinos Juniors was terminated. He then, on 6 March 2019, completed a move to Uruguay's Deportivo Maldonado. Alberione departed at the end of the year, having only appeared as an unused substitute once; in July versus Cerrito.

== Career statistics ==
As of 23 June 2020.

Club statistics
Club	Season	League			Cup		Continental		Other		Total	
Club	Season	Division	Apps	Goals	Apps	Goals	Apps	Goals	Apps	Goals	Apps	Goals
Argentinos Juniors	2016–17	Primera B Nacional	2	0	0	0	—		0	0	2	0
Argentinos Juniors	2017–18	Primera División	0	0	0	0	—		0	0	0	0
Argentinos Juniors	2018–19	Primera División	0	0	0	0	—		0	0	0	0
Argentinos Juniors	Total		2	0	0	0	—		0	0	2	0
Independiente Rivadavia (loan)	2017–18	Primera B Nacional	3	0	0	0	—		0	0	3	0
Deportivo Maldonado	2019	Segunda División	0	0	—		—		0	0	0	0
Career total			5	0	0	0	—		0	0	5	0

== Honours ==
Argentinos Juniors

- Primera B Nacional: 2016–17
