= Esteban Rueda =

Argentine footballer

Personal information
- Full name: Esteban Gabriel Rueda
- Date of birth: 28 January 1996 (age 30)
- Place of birth: Rosario, Argentina
- Height: 1.73 m (5 ft 8 in)
- Position: Forward

Team information
- Current team: San Telmo

Youth career
- Argentinos Juniors

Senior career*
Years	Team	Apps	(Gls)
2016–2019	Argentinos Juniors	19	(1)
2020–	San Telmo	26	(1)
- * Club domestic league appearances and goals as of 20:01, 31 July 2022 (UTC)

Esteban Gabriel Rueda (born 28 January 1996) is an Argentine professional footballer who plays as a forward for Primera Nacional side San Telmo.

== Career ==
Rueda's career got underway with Argentinos Juniors of Primera B Nacional in 2016. He made his professional debut on 17 October versus Ferro Carril Oeste and scored his first career goal in the process, getting the first goal in a 3–1 win. Three appearances later, he signed a new contract with the club. Overall, Rueda played fifteen times in the 2016–17 Primera B Nacional which ended with Argentinos winning the title.

== Career statistics ==
As of 8 May 2018.

Club statistics
Club	Season	League			Cup (Note: Includes the Copa Argentina)		League Cup		Continental		Other		Total	
Club	Season	Division	Apps	Goals	Apps	Goals	Apps	Goals	Apps	Goals	Apps	Goals	Apps	Goals
Argentinos Juniors	2016–17	Primera B Nacional	15	1	0	0	—		—		0	0	15	1
Argentinos Juniors	2017–18	Primera División	4	0	0	0	—		—		0	0	4	0
Career total			19	1	0	0	—		—		0	0	19	1

== Honours ==
Argentinos Juniors

- Primera B Nacional: 2016–17
