= Diego Sosa (footballer, born 1980) =

Argentine footballer

Personal information
- Full name: Diego Roberto Sosa
- Date of birth: April 17, 1980 (age 46)
- Place of birth: Aires, Argentina
- Height: 1.78 m (5 ft 10 in)
- Position: Centre-back

Senior career*
Years	Team	Apps	(Gls)
2000–2004	Fénix de Pilar	96	(3)
2004–2007	Rocha	93	(4)
2007–2010	River Plate Mtvd.	63	(2)
2010–2013	San Martín SJ	40	(0)
2013–2014	Fénix de Pilar	32	(0)
2014–2016	Deportivo Español	35	(2)
2016–2020	Flandria	111	(3)
- * Club domestic league appearances and goals

Diego Sosa full name Diego Roberto Sosa (born 17 April 1980 in Buenos Aires), is a retired Argentine footballer.
