= Iván Colman =

Argentine footballer

Personal information
- Full name: Iván Leonardo Colman
- Date of birth: 6 May 1995 (age 31)
- Place of birth: San Martín, Argentina
- Height: 1.73 m (5 ft 8 in)
- Position: Midfielder

Team information
- Current team: Cusco FC
- Number: 10

Youth career
- Boca Juniors

Senior career*
Years	Team	Apps	(Gls)
2016–2021	Argentinos Juniors	50	(3)
2018–2019	→ Aldosivi (loan)	22	(1)
2021	→ Sportivo Luqueño (loan)	18	(1)
2022–2023	Quilmes	62	(8)
2024-	Cusco FC	72	(16)

International career
2013	Argentina U20	2	(0)
- * Club domestic league appearances and goals as of 1 December 2025

Iván Leonardo Colman (born 6 May 1995) is an Argentine professional footballer who plays as a midfielder for Cusco FC.

== Career ==
=== Club ===
Colman spent time with Boca Juniors' youth teams, prior to starting his professional career with Argentine Primera División side Argentinos Juniors in 2016 following a trial. He made his debut on 27 February in a 4–1 league defeat to Estudiantes (LP). Two more appearances came in a season that ended in relegation for Argentinos, Colman subsequently played thirty-seven times in Primera B Nacional and scored three goals; the first of which came versus Estudiantes (SL). He was loaned out to Aldosivi for the 2018–19 Argentine Primera División campaign.

=== International ===
Colman represented Argentina's U20 team at the 2013 L'Alcúdia International Football Tournament, appearing in games against Canada and Spain.

== Career statistics ==
As of 10 September 2018.

Club statistics
Club	Season	League			Cup (Note: Includes the Copa Argentina)		League Cup		Continental		Other		Total	
Club	Season	Division	Apps	Goals	Apps	Goals	Apps	Goals	Apps	Goals	Apps	Goals	Apps	Goals
Argentinos Juniors	2016	Primera División	3	0	0	0	—		—		0	0	3	0
Argentinos Juniors	2016–17	Primera B Nacional	37	3	1	0	—		—		0	0	38	3
Argentinos Juniors	2017–18	Primera División	9	0	0	0	—		—		0	0	9	0
Argentinos Juniors	2018–19	Primera División	0	0	0	0	—		—		0	0	0	0
Argentinos Juniors	Total		49	3	1	0	—		—		0	0	50	3
Aldosivi (loan)	2018–19	Primera División	4	1	0	0	—		—		0	0	4	1
Career total			53	4	1	0	—		—		0	0	54	4

== Honours ==
Argentinos Juniors

- Primera B Nacional: 2016–17
