= Miguel Torrén =

Argentine footballer

Personal information
- Full name: Miguel Ángel Torrén
- Date of birth: August 12, 1988 (age 38)
- Place of birth: Villa Constitución, Argentina
- Height: 1.78 m (5 ft 10 in)
- Position: Centre-back

Team information
- Current team: Bolívar
- Number: 3

Youth career
- Newell's Old Boys

Senior career*
| Years | Team | Apps | (Gls) |
| 2005–2008 | Newell's Old Boys | 25 | (0) |
| 2008–2010 | Cerro Porteño | 57 | (0) |
| 2010–2023 | Argentinos Juniors | 302 | (4) |
| 2024 | Unión Santa Fe | 22 | (0) |
| 2025– | Bolívar | 15 | (0) |

International career
| 2005 | Argentina U17 | 2 | (0) |
| 2007 | Argentina U20 | 5 | (0) |
- * Club domestic league appearances and goals as of 30 December 2025

Miguel Ángel Torrén (born August 12, 1988) is an Argentine professional footballer who plays as a centre-back for Bolivian Primera División side Bolívar.

== Career ==
=== Club ===
Torren played for Newell's Old Boys since 2005, but he had to wait until the Apertura 2006 tournament to become a first team regular, playing in 18 of the team's 19 games. He went on to make 25 appearances for the club, including one game in the Copa Libertadores 2006 tournament.

In 2008, he joined Cerro Porteño of Paraguay. Subsequently, in 2010, he joined defending Argentine Primera División champion Argentinos Juniors.

On February 11, 2019, he played 200 games defending the shirt of Argentinos Juniors, being the first to achieve it in the 21st century, placing 16th in the ranking of those who had the most appearances with said shirt.

On April 28, 2019, scored his first goal as a professional. It was in the 1–0 victory against San Lorenzo in the Argentine Super League Cup

== Titles ==
| Title | Club | Country | Year |
|---|---|---|---|
| Torneo Apertura | Cerro Porteño | Paraguay | 2009 |
| Primera B Nacional | Argentinos Juniors | Argentina | 2017 |
