= Enrique Borja (footballer, born 1995) =

Paraguayan professional footballer

Personal information
- Full name: Enrique Javier Borja Araújo
- Date of birth: 30 May 1995 (age 31)
- Place of birth: San Ignacio, Paraguay
- Height: 1.85 m (6 ft 1 in)
- Position: Forward

Team information
- Current team: Calicut

Youth career
- Cerro Porteño

Senior career*
Years	Team	Apps	(Gls)
2014–2017	Cerro Porteño	10	(1)
2015	→ Sportivo Luqueño (loan)	10	(1)
2016	→ Resende (loan)	0	(0)
2016	→ Guaraní (loan)	6	(1)
2017–2019	General Díaz	37	(16)
2019–2020	Argentinos Juniors	9	(0)
2019	→ Belgrano (loan)	5	(0)
2020	→ Nacional (loan)	8	(0)
2021	Sportivo Luqueño	34	(9)
2022	Sol de América	9	(2)
2022	→ Atlético Tucumán (loan)	2	(0)
2023	Guaraní	16	(1)
2023	Guaireña	14	(1)
2024	Sportivo Trinidense	7	(0)
2025–	Calicut	0	(0)
- * Club domestic league appearances and goals as of 5 June 2024

Enrique Javier Borja Araújo (born 30 May 1995) is a Paraguayan professional footballer who plays as a forward.

== Career ==
Borja started his career in Paraguay with Cerro Porteño, initially featuring for their U20 team. He made his professional bow during an away draw with General Díaz in April 2014, featuring for the last twenty-five minutes of what was his only appearance in the 2014 Paraguayan Primera División season. On 31 January 2015, Sportivo Luqueño loaned Borja. He scored his opening career goal during his first start on 25 February versus Deportivo Santaní. He returned to Cerro Porteño in June, subsequently scoring his first goal for the club in December during a win over Sol de América at the Estadio Feliciano Cáceres.

February 2016 saw the forward move to Brazilian football after agreeing a move to Resende. He netted a brace over Friburguense on his way to three strikes in nine matches in the Campeonato Carioca. Having returned to his parent club in mid-2016, Borja spent the rest of the year on loan at fellow Paraguayan Primera División team Guaraní. On 27 July 2017, Borja joined General Díaz. He ended the 2018 campaign with thirty-six appearances and sixteen goals. In December 2018, Borja signed a pre-contract agreement with Argentinos Juniors of the Argentine Primera División; effective from January 2019.

After thirteen appearances in eight months for Argentinos, Borja departed on loan in August 2019 to Belgrano of Primera B Nacional. He returned to his parent club in the succeeding January, prior to being loaned out to his homeland with Nacional. In 2021, Borja played for fellow league club Sportivo Luqueño, before signing with Sol de América ahead of the 2022 season. In July 2022, Borja once again moved to Argentina, signing a loan deal with Atlético Tucumán until the end of 2023 with a purchase option.

== Career statistics ==
As of 12 July 2020.

Club statistics
Club	Season	League			Cup		League Cup		Continental		Other		Total	
Club	Season	Division	Apps	Goals	Apps	Goals	Apps	Goals	Apps	Goals	Apps	Goals	Apps	Goals
Cerro Porteño	2014	Paraguayan Primera División	1	0	—		—		0	0	0	0	1	0
Cerro Porteño	2015	Paraguayan Primera División	7	1	—		—		0	0	1 (Note: Appearance(s) in the Paraguayan Primera División play-offs)	0	8	1
Cerro Porteño	2016	Paraguayan Primera División	0	0	—		—		0	0	0	0	0	0
Cerro Porteño	2017	Paraguayan Primera División	2	0	—		—		0	0	0	0	2	0
Cerro Porteño	Total		10	1	—		—		0	0	1	0	11	1
Sportivo Luqueño (loan)	2015	Paraguayan Primera División	10	1	—		—		—		0	0	10	1
Resende (loan)	2016	Campeonato Carioca	—		1	0	—		—		9	3	10	3
Guaraní (loan)	2016	Paraguayan Primera División	6	1	—		—		0	0	0	0	6	1
General Díaz	2017	Paraguayan Primera División	3	0	—		—		—		0	0	3	0
General Díaz	2018	Paraguayan Primera División	34	16	0	0	—		2 (Note: Appearance(s) in the Copa Sudamericana)	0	0	0	36	16
General Díaz	Total		37	16	0	0	—		2	0	0	0	39	16
Argentinos Juniors	2018–19	Argentine Primera División	9	0	0	0	3	0	1	0	0	0	13	0
Argentinos Juniors	2019–20	Argentine Primera División	0	0	0	0	0	0	0	0	0	0	0	0
Argentinos Juniors	Total		9	0	0	0	3	0	1	0	0	0	13	0
Belgrano (loan)	2019–20	Primera B Nacional	5	0	0	0	—		—		0	0	5	0
Nacional (loan)	2020	Paraguayan Primera División	3	0	0	0	—		1	0	0	0	4	0
Career total			80	19	1	0	3	0	4	0	1	0	89	19

== Honours ==
Guaraní

- Primera División: 2016 Clausura
