= Nicolás Silva =

Argentine footballer (born 1990)

Personal information
- Full name: Nicolás Alexis Silva
- Date of birth: 24 January 1990 (age 36)
- Place of birth: Rosario del Tala, Argentina
- Height: 1.63 m (5 ft 4 in)
- Position: Forward

Team information
- Current team: Cusco
- Number: 26

Senior career*
Years	Team	Apps	(Gls)
2012–2013	Sportivo Las Parejas	21	(4)
2013–2014	Chaco For Ever	31	(7)
2014–2016	Boca Unidos	40	(4)
2016–2017	Colón	37	(1)
2017–2018	Sud América	0	(0)
2017–2018	→ Huracán (loan)	13	(3)
2018–2019	Banfield	19	(0)
2019–2021	Argentinos Juniors	16	(1)
2021	→ Huracán (loan)	30	(1)
2022	Aucas	17	(0)
2023	Chaco For Ever	31	(4)
2024–	Cusco	69	(7)
- * Club domestic league appearances and goals as of 1 December 2025

Nicolás Alexis Silva (born 24 January 1990) is an Argentine professional footballer who plays as a forward for Cusco in Peru.

== Career ==
Silva got his senior career underway by joining Sportivo Las Parejas of Torneo Argentino B in 2012, he went onto make twenty-one appearances and scored four times in his debut season prior to leaving to join Torneo Argentino A club Chaco For Ever. He scored seven times in thirty-one matches during 2013–14 before moving teams again. On 1 July 2014, Silva completed a transfer to Primera B Nacional's Boca Unidos. He made his professional footballing debut in the league on 9 August versus Argentinos Juniors. After just three appearances in the 2014 campaign, Silva made thirty-seven in his second season with Boca.

2016 saw Silva depart to sign for Argentine Primera División side Colón. He scored his first top-flight goal in his second top-flight appearance; scoring Colón's fourth goal in a victory against Quilmes on 13 February. He went onto make thirty-nine appearances for Colón in two seasons. In August 2017, Silva departed to join Sud América of the Uruguayan Primera División. He was immediately loaned to Argentine club Huracán. His first match for them was in the league with Newell's Old Boys on 11 September. Silva's loan from Sud América was later investigated by FIFA for allegedly breaking transfer rules. In 2018, Silva joined Banfield.

== Career statistics ==
As of 22 March 2019.

Club statistics
Club	Season	League			Cup		Continental		Other		Total	
Club	Season	Division	Apps	Goals	Apps	Goals	Apps	Goals	Apps	Goals	Apps	Goals
Sportivo Las Parejas	2012–13	Torneo Argentino B	21	4	0	0	—		0	0	21	4
Chaco For Ever	2013–14	Torneo Argentino A	31	7	2	2	—		0	0	33	9
Boca Unidos	2014	Primera B Nacional	3	0	0	0	—		0	0	3	0
Boca Unidos	2015	Primera B Nacional	37	4	1	0	—		0	0	38	4
Boca Unidos	Total		40	4	1	0	—		0	0	41	4
Colón	2016	Argentine Primera División	14	1	1	0	—		0	0	15	1
Colón	2016–17	Argentine Primera División	23	0	1	0	—		0	0	24	0
Colón	Total		37	1	2	0	0	0	0	0	39	1
Sud América	2017	Uruguayan Primera División	0	0	—		—		0	0	0	0
Sud América	2018	Segunda División	0	0	—		—		0	0	0	0
Sud América	Total		0	0	—		—		0	0	0	0
Huracán (loan)	2017–18	Argentine Primera División	13	3	0	0	—		0	0	13	3
Banfield	2018–19	Argentine Primera División	17	0	0	0	—		0	0	17	0
Career total			159	19	5	2	0	0	0	0	164	21
