= Elías Gómez (footballer, born 1994) =

Argentine footballer

Personal information
- Full name: Elías José Gómez
- Date of birth: 9 June 1994 (age 32)
- Place of birth: Granadero Baigorria, Argentina
- Height: 1.75 m (5 ft 9 in)
- Position: Left-back

Team information
- Current team: Vélez Sarsfield
- Number: 3

Youth career
- 2006–2013: Rosario Central

Senior career*
Years	Team	Apps	(Gls)
2013–2020	Rosario Central	22	(0)
2013	→ Sportivo Las Heras (loan)	1	(0)
2016–2017	→ Defensa y Justicia (loan)	10	(0)
2019–2020	→ Argentinos Juniors (loan)	26	(3)
2020–2022	Argentinos Juniors	49	(3)
2022–2023	River Plate	31	(0)
2023–	Vélez Sarsfield	101	(2)
- * Club domestic league appearances and goals as of 16:46, 16 June 2026 (UTC)

Elías José Gómez (born 9 June 1994) is an Argentine professional footballer who plays as a left-back for Vélez Sarsfield.

== Career ==
Gómez began his career with Rosario Central in the youth team, joining in 2006. Before starting his senior career with Rosario Central, he had a short loan spell with Sportivo Las Heras in 2013. He featured for the first time for Rosario Central on 23 November 2013 during a defeat away to Olimpo. He subsequently made sixteen appearances across the following three campaigns in all competitions. On 2 February 2016, Defensa y Justicia completed the loan signing of Gómez. He remained with the club for the 2016 and 2016–17 seasons, playing in twelve matches before returning to Rosario in June 2017.

In January 2019, Gómez joined fellow top-flight side Argentinos Juniors on loan. He scored his first senior goal on 18 February against Estudiantes. Twelve months after arriving, in January 2020, Argentinos purchased Gómez permanently as the defender signed a three-and-a-half-year contract.

At the end of January 2022, Gómez joined River Plate on a deal until the end of 2025.

== Career statistics ==
As of 11 July 2020.

Club statistics
Club	Season	League			Cup		League Cup		Continental		Other		Total	
Club	Season	Division	Apps	Goals	Apps	Goals	Apps	Goals	Apps	Goals	Apps	Goals	Apps	Goals
Rosario Central	2012–13	Primera B Nacional	0	0	0	0	—		—		0	0	0	0
Rosario Central	2013–14	Primera División	4	0	0	0	—		—		0	0	4	0
Rosario Central	2014	Primera División	7	0	0	0	—		0	0	0	0	7	0
Rosario Central	2015	Primera División	5	0	1	0	—		—		0	0	6	0
Rosario Central	2016	Primera División	0	0	0	0	—		0	0	0	0	0	0
Rosario Central	2016–17	Primera División	0	0	0	0	—		—		0	0	0	0
Rosario Central	2017–18	Primera División	3	0	2	0	—		0	0	0	0	5	0
Rosario Central	2018–19	Primera División	3	0	0	0	0	0	0	0	0	0	3	0
Rosario Central	2019–20	Primera División	0	0	0	0	0	0	—		0	0	0	0
Rosario Central	Total		22	0	3	0	0	0	0	0	0	0	25	0
Sportivo Las Heras (loan)	2012–13	Torneo Argentino B	1	0	0	0	—		—		0	0	1	0
Defensa y Justicia (loan)	2016	Primera División	1	0	0	0	—		—		0	0	1	0
Defensa y Justicia (loan)	2016–17	Primera División	9	0	2	0	—		0	0	0	0	11	0
Defensa y Justicia (loan)	Total		10	0	2	0	—		0	0	0	0	12	0
Argentinos Juniors (loan)	2018–19	Primera División	10	2	0	0	0	0	3 (Note: Appearance(s) in the Copa Sudamericana)	0	0	0	13	2
Argentinos Juniors (loan)	2019–20	Primera División	16	1	0	0	0	0	0	0	0	0	16	1
Argentinos Juniors	2019–20	Primera División	6	0	1	0	1	0	2	0	0	0	10	0
Argentinos Juniors	Total		32	3	1	0	1	0	5	0	0	0	39	3
Career total			65	3	6	0	1	0	5	0	0	0	77	3

== Honours ==
Vélez Sarsfield

- Argentine Primera División: 2024
- Supercopa Internacional: 2024
