= Enzo Ybañez =

Argentine footballer

Personal information
- Full name: Enzo Agustín Ybañez
- Date of birth: 29 August 1998 (age 28)
- Place of birth: Tigre, Argentina
- Height: 1.73 m (5 ft 8 in)
- Position: Left-back

Team information
- Current team: Estudiantes San Luis

Youth career
- River Plate
- Argentinos Juniors

Senior career*
Years	Team	Apps	(Gls)
2017–2023	Argentinos Juniors	9	(0)
2020	→ Godoy Cruz (loan)	2	(0)
2020–2021	→ Barracas Central (loan)	12	(1)
2022	→ Almirante Brown (loan)	0	(0)
2022	→ Comunicaciones (loan)	8	(0)
2023–	Estudiantes San Luis	13	(0)
- * Club domestic league appearances and goals as of 19:32, 16 July 2023 (UTC)

Enzo Agustín Ybañez (born 29 August 1998) is an Argentine professional footballer who plays as a left-back for Estudiantes San Luis.

== Career ==
Ybañez spent time in the River Plate youth system prior to joining the ranks of Argentinos Juniors. He made his professional debut in the final match of Argentinos' Primera B Nacional title-winning campaign of 2016–17, versus Chacarita Juniors on 30 July 2017. On 26 December 2019, it was confirmed that Ybañez and his teammate, Gabriel Carrasco, had joined Primera División side Godoy Cruz on loan for the rest of the season. He made just two appearances, in January versus River Plate and in March versus Vélez Sarsfield, before returning to his parent club.

On 31 July 2020, he was then loaned out to Barracas Central for the 2020–21 season. He never played an official match for the club, before returning to Argentinos in May 2022. In June 2022, he joined Club Comunicaciones on loan.

After his loan deal at Comunicaciones came to an end at the end of 2022, it was confirmed in March 2023 that Ybañez had signed with Torneo Federal A club Sportivo Estudiantes.

== Career statistics ==
As of 14 July 2020.

Club statistics
Club	Season	League			Cup		League Cup		Continental		Other		Total	
Club	Season	Division	Apps	Goals	Apps	Goals	Apps	Goals	Apps	Goals	Apps	Goals	Apps	Goals
Argentinos Juniors	2016–17	Primera B Nacional	1	0	0	0	—		—		0	0	1	0
Argentinos Juniors	2017–18	Primera División	0	0	0	0	—		—		0	0	0	0
Argentinos Juniors	2018–19	Primera División	8	0	1	0	0	0	2 (Note: Appearance(s) in the Copa Sudamericana)	0	0	0	11	0
Argentinos Juniors	2019–20	Primera División	0	0	0	0	0	0	2	0	0	0	2	0
Argentinos Juniors	Total		9	0	1	0	0	0	4	0	0	0	14	0
Godoy Cruz (loan)	2019–20	Primera División	2	0	0	0	0	0	—		0	0	2	0
Career total			11	0	1	0	0	0	4	0	0	0	16	0

== Honours ==
Argentinos Juniors

- Primera B Nacional: 2016–17
