= Diego Sosa (footballer, born 1991) =

Argentine footballer

Personal information
- Full name: Diego Sosalame
- Date of birth: 24 October 1991 (age 35)
- Place of birth: Tandil, Argentina
- Height: 1.68 m (5 ft 6 in)
- Position: Midfielder

Team information
- Current team: San Miguel

Senior career*
Years	Team	Apps	(Gls)
2009–2013	Grupo Universitario	94	(13)
2013–2014	Tiro Federal	15	(3)
2014–2015	Olimpo	4	(0)
2016–2017	Santamarina	47	(3)
2017–2018	Boca Unidos	23	(3)
2018–2019	Godoy Cruz	20	(0)
2019–2022	Argentinos Juniors	37	(1)
2022	→ San Martín T. (loan)	30	(4)
2023	Deportivo Morón	24	(5)
2024–	San Miguel	51	(2)
- * Club domestic league appearances and goals as of 17:26, 17 August 2025 (UTC)

Diego Sosa (born 24 October 1991) is an Argentine professional footballer who plays as a midfielder for San Miguel.

== Career ==
Sosa began his career in Torneo Argentino B with Grupo Universitario, scoring thirteen goals in ninety-four appearances in four years with the club. In 2013, Sosa joined fellow Torneo Argentino A team Tiro Federal. Three goals in fifteen matches followed. Argentine Primera División side Olimpo completed the signing of Sosa in September 2014. He made his professional debut against Racing Club on 25 October, which was the first of three appearances for Olimpo in the 2014 season. Sosa was selected in just one match in 2015, which preceded the midfielder departing to join Santamarina ahead of the 2016 Primera B Nacional campaign.

His first goal in professional football arrived on 11 April 2016 during a win over Gimnasia y Esgrima. On 1 August 2017, Sosa signed for Boca Unidos of Primera B Nacional. After netting three times in twenty-three fixtures in 2017–18 as the club were relegated, Sosa agreed to join Argentine Primera División team Godoy Cruz in July 2018.

In July 2019, Sosa moved to fellow league club Argentinos Juniors, signing a one-year deal. In January 2022, he was loaned out to San Martín de Tucumán until the end of the year.

== Career statistics ==
As of 1 November 2018.

Club statistics
Club	Season	League			Cup (Note: Includes the Copa Argentina)		League Cup		Continental (Note: Includes the Copa Libertadores)		Other		Total	
Club	Season	Division	Apps	Goals	Apps	Goals	Apps	Goals	Apps	Goals	Apps	Goals	Apps	Goals
Tiro Federal	2013–14	Torneo Argentino B	15	3	0	0	—		—		0	0	15	3
Olimpo	2014	Primera División	3	0	0	0	—		—		0	0	3	0
Olimpo	2015	Primera División	1	0	0	0	—		—		0	0	1	0
Olimpo	Total		4	0	0	0	—		—		0	0	4	0
Santamarina	2016	Primera B Nacional	18	1	0	0	—		—		0	0	18	1
Santamarina	2016–17	Primera B Nacional	29	2	3	0	—		—		0	0	32	2
Santamarina	Total		47	3	3	0	—		—		0	0	50	3
Boca Unidos	2017–18	Primera B Nacional	23	3	0	0	—		—		0	0	23	3
Godoy Cruz	2018–19	Primera División	9	0	1	0	—		0	0	0	0	10	0
Career total			98	9	4	0	—		0	0	0	0	102	9
