= Damián Batallini =

Argentine footballer (born 1996)

Personal information
- Full name: Damián Iván Batallini
- Date of birth: 24 June 1996 (age 30)
- Place of birth: Don Torcuato, Argentina
- Height: 1.74 m (5 ft 8 1/2 in)
- Position: Winger

Team information
- Current team: Bolívar (on loan from Argentinos Juniors)
- Number: 99

Youth career
- Deportivo Armenio
- River Plate
- Deportivo Armenio
- 2010–2016: Argentinos Juniors

Senior career*
Years	Team	Apps	(Gls)
2016–	Argentinos Juniors	99	(15)
2021	→ Atlético San Luis (loan)	20	(0)
2022	→ Independiente (loan)	33	(3)
2023	→ Necaxa (loan)	13	(1)
2023	→ Colón (loan)	7	(1)
2024–2025	→ Instituto (loan)	26	(2)
2025–	→ Bolívar (loan)	9	(1)

International career
- Argentina U15
- * Club domestic league appearances and goals as of 30 December 2025

Damián Iván Batallini (born 24 June 1996) is an Argentine professional footballer who plays as a winger for Bolívar, on loan from Argentinos Juniors. (Note: Damián Batallini at WorldFootball.net)

== Club career ==
Batallini came through the youth ranks of Deportivo Armenio, River Plate and Argentinos Juniors. He made his pro debut for Argentinos in the Argentine Primera División against Tigre on 6 February 2016. Seven matches later, Batallini scored the first goal of his career in a 2–2 draw with Racing Club. He made twelve appearances and scored two goals in a season which ended in relegation to Primera B Nacional. In the second tier, he scored three goals in sixteen games as Argentinos won the title. In December 2020, after over a hundred games for them, Batallini agreed a move to Liga MX side Atlético San Luis.

On 25 January 2022, Batallini joined Independiente on a loan deal for a fee around 250,000 dollars until the end of the year, with a purchase option of 2 million dollars for 50% of his rights.

== International career ==
Batallini played for the Argentina U15 team under manager Adrián Domenech.

== Career statistics ==
As of 9 December 2020

Club statistics
Club	Season	League			Cup		League Cup		Continental		Other		Total	
Club	Season	Division	Apps	Goals	Apps	Goals	Apps	Goals	Apps	Goals	Apps	Goals	Apps	Goals
Argentinos Juniors	2016	Primera División	12	2	0	0	—		—		0	0	12	2
Argentinos Juniors	2016–17	Primera B Nacional	16	3	1	0	—		—		0	0	17	3
Argentinos Juniors	2017–18	Primera División	23	4	1	1	—		—		0	0	24	5
Argentinos Juniors	2018–19	Primera División	15	2	1	0	5	1	2 (Note: Appearance(s) in the Copa Sudamericana)	1	0	0	23	4
Argentinos Juniors	2019–20	Primera División	19	2	2	0	1	0	1	0	0	0	23	2
Argentinos Juniors	2020–21 (Note: Soccerway counts Copa de la Liga Profesional appearances as league appearances.)	Primera División	4	1	1	0	0	0	—		0	0	5	1
Argentinos Juniors	Total		89	14	6	1	6	1	3	1	0	0	109	17
Atlético San Luis	2020–21	Liga MX	0	0	0	0	—		—		0	0	0	0
Career total			89	14	6	1	6	1	3	1	0	0	104	17

== Honours ==
Argentinos Juniors

- Primera B Nacional: 2016–17
