= Estadio Diego Armando Maradona =

Football stadium in Buenos Aires, Argentina

Coordinates: 34°36′22″S 58°28′21″W

Diego Armando Maradona Stadium
- Estadio Diego Armando Maradona
- El Tifón de Boyacá (Boyacá street's typhoon)

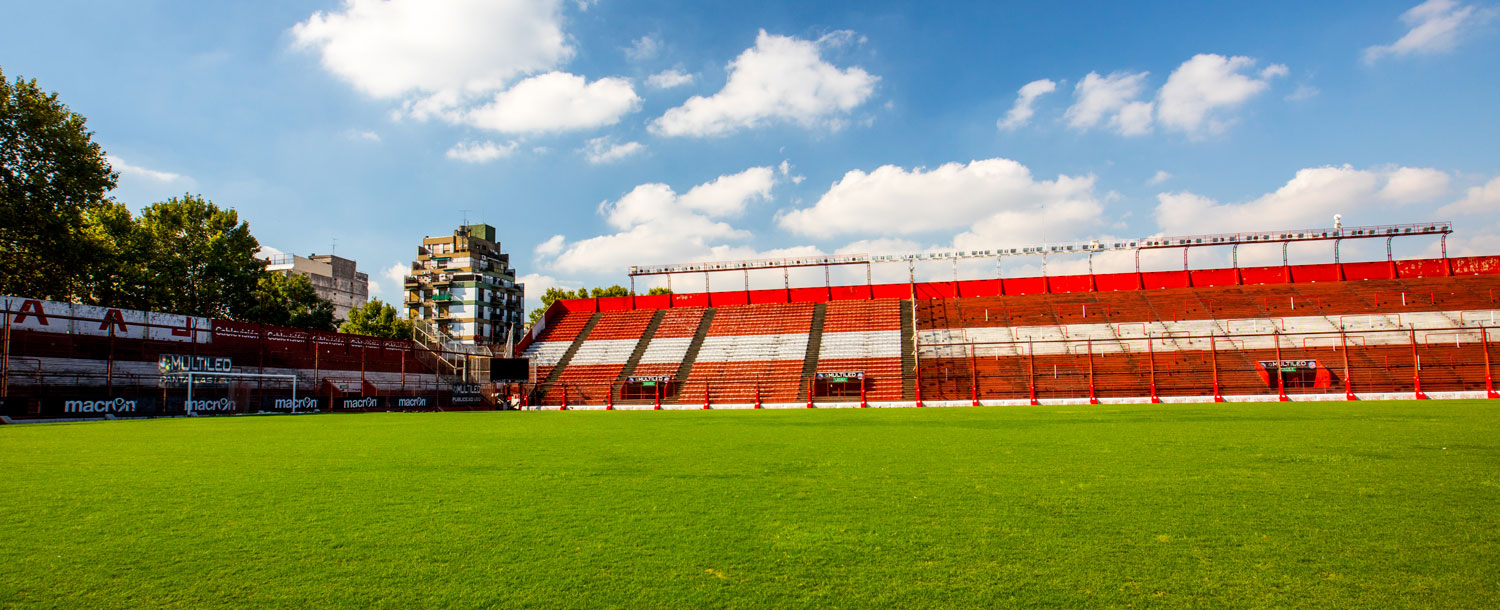
- View of the field and stands
- Interactive map of Diego Armando Maradona Stadium
- Full name: Estadio Diego Armando Maradona
- Former names: Estadio Argentinos Juniors (1940–1983)
- Address: Gavilán 2151; Buenos Aires; Argentina
- Owner: Argentinos Juniors
- Capacity: 25,110
- Surface: Grass
- Field size: 100 x 67m

Construction
- Built: 1939–1940, 1995–2003
- Opened: 27 April 1940; 86 years ago
- Reopened: 26 December 2003
- Demolished: 1995
- Cost: US$ 8,000,000
- Architect: Héctor Caracciolo

Tenants
- Argentinos Juniors (1940–1983, 2003–present)

Website
- argentinosjuniors.com.ar/estadio

The Estadio Diego Armando Maradona is a football stadium located in the district of Villa General Mitre, Buenos Aires, Argentina. It is the home venue of club Argentinos Juniors, and has a capacity of 25,110 spectators.

It was given its name in 2004 in honour of former Argentinos player Diego Maradona (1960–2020) who made his professional debut here in 1976, following the refurbishment of the ground, and to celebrate the club's centenary year.

== History ==
The first field of Argentinos Juniors was located on Gaona and Añasco streets, moving to Villa Ballester in 1906 although the team only remained one year there, returning to their original neighborhood but in another field located on Luis Viale and Parral streets. In 1913 Argentinos Juniors set their field on Fraga and Estomba in Villa Ortúzar, which would be also used by clubs Colegiales in the 1930s and Almagro in the 1940s. The club played their home matches there until 1924.

Between 1925 and 1937 Argentinos Juniors built and used a stadium on a land owned by Buenos Aires and Pacific Railway. The venue was located on Av. San Martìn and Punta Arenas in La Paternal neighborhood. Nevertheless the BA&P Railway evicted Argentinos Juniors from the land after the club had a large debt with the British company. The club moved to Médanos and Boyacá streets and built a new stadium with the structures previously dismantled. The new stadium was opened on 27 April 1940 when Argentinos Juniors defeated Barracas Central 2–1.

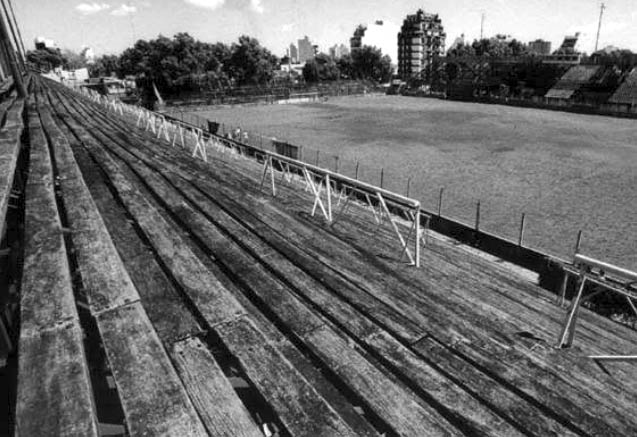
Grandstand over J.A. García street, c. 1970

Since it was small and unsafe, the stadium was left apart in the early 1980s, and the football team moved its basis to the nearer Arquitecto Ricardo Etcheverri stadium, in the neighbourhood of Caballito. The idea was to build a modern and bigger stadium with the 5,800,000 dollars that the club received from the transfer of Diego Armando Maradona to the FC Barcelona but finally that money was invested in constructing other venues at the multisport complex Las Malvinas, owned by the same club, and in bringing some first level footballers in order to succeed at the national championship. The project of the new stadium had to wait until the next decade.

In 1995, the old stadium was demolished, but at the same time a deep economic crisis hit the club and continued for a long time, delaying the works for eight years. Finally, in 2003, the new stadium was finished, and opened on December 26. Six months later, the team returned to the Argentinean First Division, where it is now based. The opening ceremony included two football games between the 1984 team, that won the first national championship for the club versus the team that won the second division tournament in 1997, and another one between the Argentinean U-20 national team and a mix of some of the best players born in the club's youth divisions such as Juan Pablo Sorín, Esteban Cambiasso, Diego Placente, Carlos Mac Allister, Claudio Borghi, Fabricio Coloccini, Leonel Gancedo and Sergio Batista together with some other remarkable footballers that played in Argentinos, such as Ubaldo Fillol.

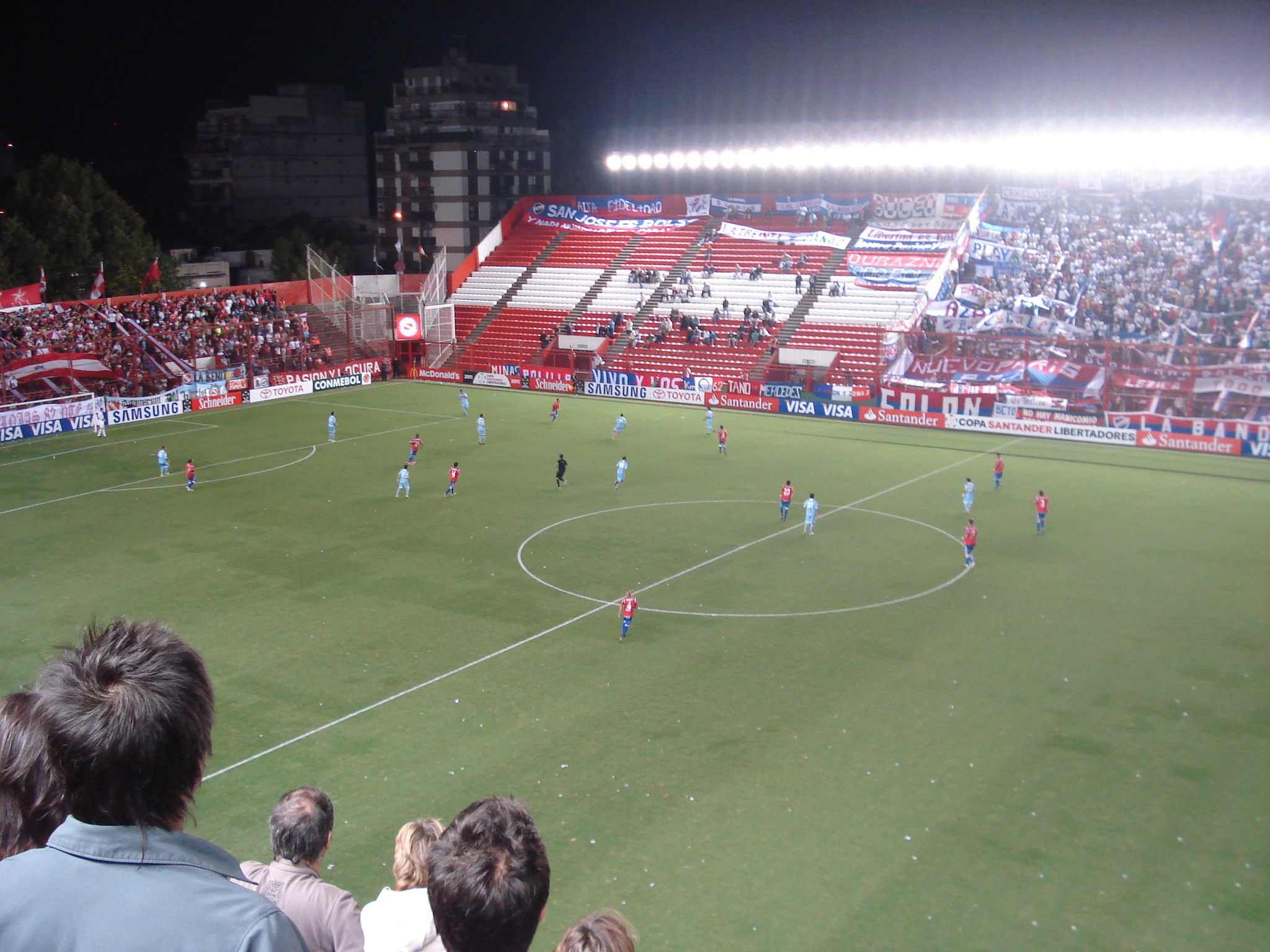
The stadium during a match in 2011

At the end of 2003 works concluded, after several interruptions for economic reasons, since the stadium was built with genuine money paid into the club and not by companies or donations, as some versions wanted to indicate, reopening with a great party on December 26 of that year, with 30,000 people in the stands to watch how a team of Argentinos Juniors' former players of the 1985 Copa Libertadores winning team against the squad that achieved promotion to Primera División in 1997, plus a match between the U20 Argentinos Juniors vs a combined of past club legends from the youth academy including Esteban Cambiasso, Juan Pablo Sorín and Claudio Borghi. The aforementioned teams were managed, respectively, by Roberto Saporiti, Osvaldo Chiche Sosa, José Pekerman, and Hugo Tocalli, all of them former players or coaches of the club and identified with it.

Lionel Messi made his debut with the Argentina U20 national team in this stadium and scored his first international goal in a friendly match against Paraguay on 29 June 2004.

== Concerts ==
In March 31st 1973 there was a Rock Festival to celebrate the victory of the peronist formula Cámpora-Solano Lima at the recent General Elections after eighteen years of proscription of the Justicialist Party. The festival was in the old stadium and ended early because of a wind and rain storm. Registered by the journalist Miguel Grinberg it is considered one of the first amalgamations of politics and rock culture in Argentina. The festival counted with the presence of foundational bands and artists of the rock, blues and early metal scene of Argentina such as: Aquelarre, Billy Bond y La Pesada del Rock and Roll, Pappo’s Blues, Pescado Rabioso, Sui Generis, Dulces (Dulcemembriyo), Gabriela Parodi, León Gieco, Raúl Porchetto, Escarcha, Color Humano, Litto Nebbia and Pajarito Zaguri.

In May 2009 the D. A. M. Stadium was the venue for the Talento de Barrio World Tour concert in Buenos Aires. It was the first time reggaeton superstar Daddy Yankee performed in an outdoor stadium in Argentina.

In September 3rd 2022 there was a concert of rock band Los Gardelitos that lasted more than five hours and set the record of being the first rock band of Argentina playing its entire discography with 61 songs from five different albums. Three weeks later the stadium host a concert of rock band Airbag, which was also the first show performed in an outdoor stadium for the band. In October that same year, Wos performed at Diego Armando Maradona stadium.

In October 26th 2024 the rock band Divididos performed at the stadium in a show that paid homage to the neighbourhood's identity of rock, blues, metal and football. The band played a selection of its own songs mixed with tributes to the figure of Diego Maradona and to the music of Pappo Napolitano, Billy Bond y La Pesada del Rock and Roll, Luis A. Spinetta and Ricardo Iorio among others. The show counted with guests artist that were part of the bands tributed and others from the music scene of folclore, tango or rap.
