= 2019 Copa Sudamericana final =

- Event: 2019 Copa Sudamericana
Independiente del Valle	Colón
(Ecuador)	(Argentina)
3	1
- Date: 9 November 2019
- Venue: Estadio General Pablo Rojas, Asunción
- Referee: Raphael Claus (Brazil)
- Attendance: 44,828

The 2019 Copa Sudamericana final was the final match to decide the winner of the 2019 Copa Sudamericana, the 18th edition of the Copa Sudamericana, South America's secondary international club football tournament organized by CONMEBOL.

The final was contested in a single match format between Ecuadorian team Independiente del Valle and Argentinian team Colón, at the Estadio General Pablo Rojas in Asunción, Paraguay on 9 November 2019. This was the first final to be played as a single match at a venue chosen in advance.

Independiente del Valle defeated Colón by a 3–1 score to win their first Copa Sudamericana title. As champions, Independiente del Valle earned the right to play against the winners of the 2019 Copa Libertadores in the 2020 Recopa Sudamericana. They also automatically qualified for the 2020 Copa Libertadores group stage. They would also have played the winners of the 2019 J.League Cup in the 2020 J.League Cup / Copa Sudamericana Championship, but it would not be held due to the 2020 Tokyo Olympics scheduled to be held at the same time.

== Teams ==
Team	Previous finals appearances (bold indicates winners)
(Ecuador) Independiente del Valle	None
(Argentina) Colón	None

== Venue ==
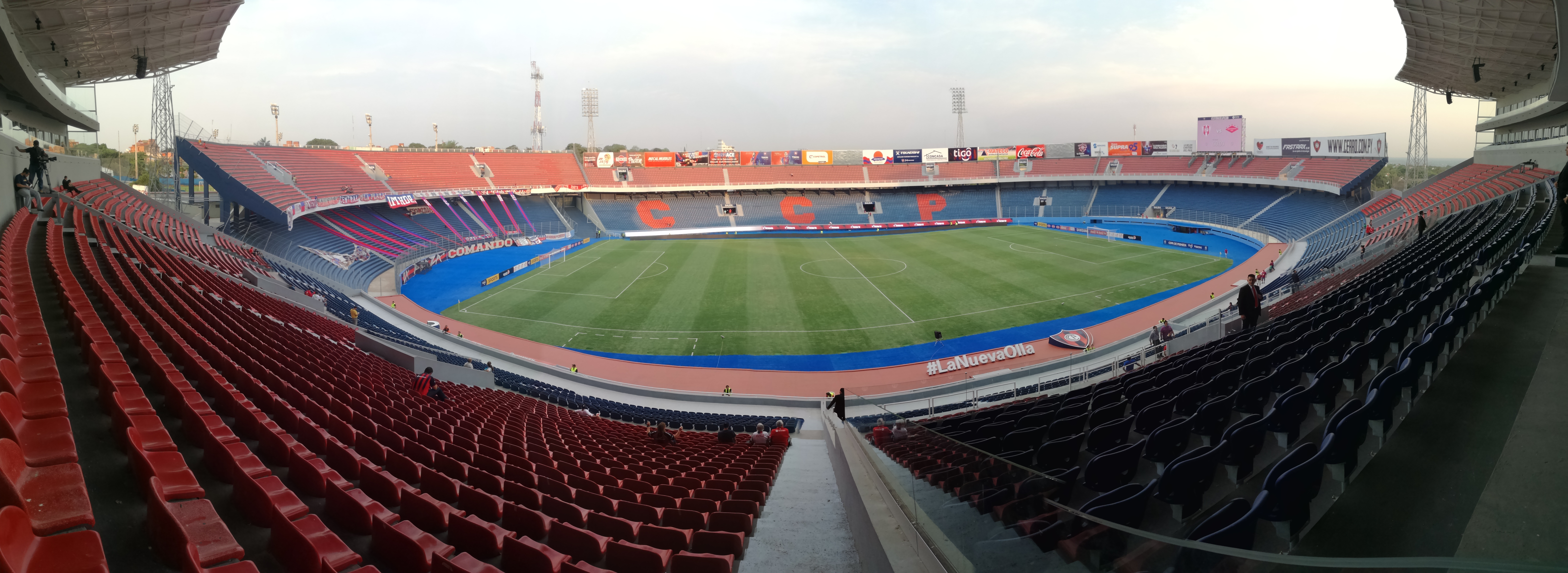
The Estadio General Pablo Rojas in Asunción, Paraguay, hosted the final.

On 14 August 2018, CONMEBOL decided that starting from the 2019 edition, the final would be played as a single match, and although it was originally stated that the final would be played in Lima, Peru at the Estadio Nacional, on 9 May 2019 the confederation's Council decided to switch the venue to Estadio Defensores del Chaco in Asunción, Paraguay. On 21 June 2019, APF announced that Estadio General Pablo Rojas in Asunción would host the 2019 final due to remodeling works in Estadio Defensores del Chaco.

== Show ==
Before the game, two bands identified with the finalist teams played on the field: Los Palmeras, for Colón, and La Vagancia, for Independiente. Then the Puerto Rican singer Luis Fonsi finished the show.

== Road to the final ==
Note: In all scores below, the score of the home team is given first.

(Ecuador) Independiente del Valle			Round	(Argentina) Colón		
Opponent	Venue	Score	**Elimination**	Opponent	Venue	Score
(Argentina) Unión (tied 2–2 on aggregate, won on penalties)	Away	2–0	First stage	(Peru) Deportivo Municipal (won 5–0 on aggregate)	Away	0–3
(Argentina) Unión (tied 2–2 on aggregate, won on penalties)	Home	2–0 (4–2 p)	First stage	(Peru) Deportivo Municipal (won 5–0 on aggregate)	Home	2–0
(Chile) Universidad Católica (won 7–3 on aggregate)	Home	5–0	Second stage	(Uruguay) River Plate (won 3–1 on aggregate)	Away	0–0
(Chile) Universidad Católica (won 7–3 on aggregate)	Away	3–2	Second stage	(Uruguay) River Plate (won 3–1 on aggregate)	Home	3–1
**Seed 2**			Final stages	**Seed 12**		
(Venezuela) Caracas (won 2–0 on aggregate)	Away	0–0	Round of 16	(Argentina) Argentinos Juniors (tied 1–1 on aggregate, won on penalties)	Home	0–1
(Venezuela) Caracas (won 2–0 on aggregate)	Home	2–0	Round of 16	(Argentina) Argentinos Juniors (tied 1–1 on aggregate, won on penalties)	Away	0–1 (4–2 p)
(Argentina) Independiente (tied 2–2 on aggregate, won on away goals)	Away	2–1	Quarter-finals	(Venezuela) Zulia (won 4–1 on aggregate)	Away	1–0
(Argentina) Independiente (tied 2–2 on aggregate, won on away goals)	Home	1–0	Quarter-finals	(Venezuela) Zulia (won 4–1 on aggregate)	Home	4–0
(Brazil) Corinthians (won 4–2 on aggregate)	Away	0–2	Semi-finals	(Brazil) Atlético Mineiro (tied 3–3 on aggregate, won on penalties)	Home	2–1
(Brazil) Corinthians (won 4–2 on aggregate)	Home	2–2	Semi-finals	(Brazil) Atlético Mineiro (tied 3–3 on aggregate, won on penalties)	Away	2–1 (4–3 p)

== Format ==
The final was played as a single match at a venue pre-selected by CONMEBOL, with the higher-seeded team designated as the "home" team for administrative purposes (Regulations Article 25). If tied after regulation, 30 minutes of extra time would be played. If still tied after extra time, the penalty shoot-out would be used to determine the winner (Regulations Article 28).

== Match ==
At 18:05 UTC−3, in the 32nd minute, the match was interrupted due to severe weather. The match resumed at 19:00 UTC−3.

9 November 2019
17:30 UTC−3

Independiente del Valle (Ecuador)	3–1	(Argentina) Colón
León 24'; Sánchez 41'; Dájome 90+5'	Report	Olivera 88'

Estadio General Pablo Rojas, Asunción
Attendance: 44,828
Referee: Raphael Claus (Brazil)

**Independiente del Valle**	**Colón**

GK	14	(Ecuador) Jorge Pinos
RB	4	(Ecuador) Anthony Landázuri	(yellow card) 49'
CB	27	(Ecuador) Fernando León
CB	5	(Argentina) Richard Schunke
LB	2	(Ecuador) Luis Segovia
CM	16	(Argentina) Cristian Pellerano
RW	11	(Colombia) Cristian Dájome	(yellow card) 75'
RM	21	(Ecuador) Alan Franco
LM	10	(Ecuador) Efrén Mera (c)		(substituted off) 79'
LW	15	(Ecuador) Jhon Jairo Sánchez		(substituted off) 74'
CF	8	(Panama) Gabriel Torres		(substituted off) 85'
Substitutes:
GK	13	(Ecuador) Hamilton Piedra
DF	6	(Ecuador) Bryan Rivera
DF	17	(Ecuador) Ángelo Preciado
DF	18	(Ecuador) Leonardo Realpe
MF	23	(Spain) Dani Nieto
MF	24	(Ecuador) Roberto Garcés		(substituted on) 79'
FW	7	(Ecuador) Washington Corozo		(substituted on) 85'
FW	9	(Ecuador) Alejandro Cabeza		(substituted on) 74'
FW	20	(Ecuador) Juan Govea
Manager:
(Spain) Miguel Ángel Ramírez

GK	1	(Uruguay) Leonardo Burián
RB	19	(Argentina) Alex Vigo	(substituted off) 65'
CB	24	(Argentina) Guillermo Ortiz
CB	6	(Argentina) Emanuel Olivera
LB	13	(Argentina) Gonzalo Escobar	(substituted off) 69'
RM	23	(Argentina) Christian Bernardi	(substituted off) 76'
CM	21	(Argentina) Federico Lértora
CM	8	(Argentina) Fernando Zuqui
LM	28	(Paraguay) Marcelo Estigarribia
RF	10	(Argentina) Luis Miguel Rodríguez (c)
LF	27	(Colombia) Wilson Morelo
Substitutes:
GK	17	(Argentina) Ignacio Chicco
DF	2	(Argentina) Lucas Acevedo
DF	3	(Argentina) Gastón Díaz
DF	15	(Argentina) Damián Schmidt
DF	16	(Argentina) Franco Quiroz
MF	5	(Argentina) Matías Fritzler
MF	14	(Argentina) Santiago Pierotti
MF	25	(Argentina) Brian Farioli
MF	30	(Argentina) Gabriel Esparza	(substituted on) 69'
FW	7	(Argentina) Nicolás Leguizamón
FW	12	(Argentina) Tomás Chancalay	(substituted on) 76'
FW	29	(Paraguay) Jorge Ortega	(substituted on) 65'
Manager:
(Argentina) Pablo Lavallén

Assistant referees:
Emerson de Carvalho (Brazil)
Bruno Pires (Brazil)
Fourth official:
Alexis Herrera (Venezuela)
Video assistant referee:
Daniel Fedorczuk (Uruguay)
Assistant video assistant referees:
Víctor Carrillo (Peru)
Danilo Manis (Brazil)
Nicolás Tarán (Uruguay)

**Match rules**

- 90 minutes.
- 30 minutes of extra time if necessary.
- Penalty shoot-out if scores still level.
- Twelve named substitutes.
- Maximum of three substitutions, with a fourth allowed in extra time.

== See also ==
- 2019 Copa Libertadores final
- 2020 Recopa Sudamericana
