= 2019–20 Club Atlético Colón season =

Colón
2019–20 season
- President: José Vignatti
- Manager: Pablo Lavallén
- Stadium: Estadio Brigadier General Estanislao López
- Top goalscorer: League: Wilson Morelo (2); All: Wilson Morelo (3)

The 2019–20 season is Colón's 6th consecutive season in the top division of Argentine football. In addition to the Primera División, the club are competing in the Copa Argentina, Copa de la Superliga and Copa Sudamericana.

The season generally covers the period from 1 July 2019 to 30 June 2020.

== Review ==
=== Pre-season ===
Colón started their pre-season campaign with defeat at the hands of Gimnasia y Esgrima (J) of Primera B Nacional on 22 June 2019, with Diego López notching the only goal of the game. They played one further fixture with Gimnasia that day, running out 4–0 winners at the Estadio Padre Ernesto Martearena; Mateo Hernández notched a brace. Two new signings were confirmed in the week commencing 24 June, as Gastón Díaz joined from Vélez Sarsfield while Rodrigo Aliendro made a move from Atlético Tucumán. Gustavo Toledo left as part of the Aliendro deal, agreeing terms with Atlético Tucumán on 28 June. A third and fourth exhibition match was played on 29 June, as Colón held Newell's Old Boys to a draw in game one before winning the second thanks to Nicolás Leguizamón.

Cristian Guanca (Al-Ettifaq) and Juan Bauza (Gimnasia y Esgrima (M) respective loans away from last season officially ended on 30 June. On 2 July, Guanca returned to Saudi Arabia on a permanent contract with Al-Shabab. Lucas Acevedo, from recently relegated San Martín, signed for Colón on 4 July. Patronato's Cristian Tarragona condemned Colón to a friendly loss on 5 July.

=== July ===
Colón, on 11 July, opened their competitive schedule with defeat after losing to league rivals Argentinos Juniors in the first leg of a Copa Sudamericana round of sixteen tie, following a strike from Matías Romero after thirty-eight minutes on home soil. The two teams met again on 17 July, with Colón equalling the scores on aggregate with a 0–1 win. Christian Bernardi's goal sent it to penalties, which saw them come out 3–4 victors. On 22 July, Gonzalo Bueno joined Almería. Mauro Da Luz, a Uruguayan midfielder from his homeland's River Plate, penned a loan contract on 23 July. Federico Lértora moved to Colón from Belgrano on 25 July. Colón faced Patronato in their opening fixture of the Primera División on 27 July, coming away with a loss after a Christian Chimino goal.

On 25 July, Franco Zuculini departed to Venezia of Italy's Serie B. 29 July saw Juan Bauza sign with Górnik Zabrze of Poland's Ekstraklasa.

=== August ===
August began with a second successive defeat in the Primera División, as a trip to Huracán ended 2–0 in favour of the hosts. Zulia, in a quarter-final tie in the Copa Sudamericana, gained a first leg advantage after Abel Casquete struck to defeat Colón on 8 August. Colón advanced to the Copa Sudamericana semi-finals on 15 August, as they struck four goals at the Estadio Brigadier General Estanislao López to overturn the first leg deficit against Venezuela's Zulia; who finished the contest with nine men. A brace from Wilson Morelo gave Colón their first league victory of 2019–20, as they defeated Gimnasia y Esgrima (LP) on 19 August. Belgrano revealed, on 23 August, that they and Colón had agreed a deal for Lucas Acosta in the preceding months, though Acosta rejected the move.

A 2–0 beating at the Estadio Libertadores de América to Independiente on 24 August meant Colón suffered their third league loss in four games. Colón put four goals past Sol de Mayo in the Copa Argentina on 28 August, as they progressed to the round of sixteen.

=== September ===
Colón drew at home to Rosario Central in the Primera División on 1 September, with Rodrigo Aliendro netting the host's goal. Colón completed the signing of Jorge Ortega from Olimpia on 2 September.

== Squad ==
Squad No.	Nationality	Name	Position(s)	Date of Birth (age)	Signed from
Goalkeepers
1	Uruguay	Leonardo Burián	GK	21 January 1984 (age 42)	Godoy Cruz
17	Argentina	Ignacio Chicco	GK	30 June 1996 (age 30)	Academy
22	Argentina	Joaquín Hass	GK	27 March 1998 (age 28)	Academy
Defenders
2	Argentina	Lucas Acevedo	CB	8 November 1991 (age 35)	San Martín
3	Argentina	Clemente Rodríguez	LB	31 July 1981 (age 45)	São Paulo
6	Argentina	Emanuel Olivera	CB	2 April 1990 (age 36)	Boca Unidos
13	Argentina	Alex Vigo	RB	28 April 1999 (age 27)	Academy
15	Argentina	Damián Schmidt	CB	7 December 1992 (age 33)	San Martín
16	Argentina	Franco Quiroz	LB	11 March 1998 (age 28)	Wanderers de Concordia
24	Argentina	Guillermo Ortiz	CB	9 August 1992 (age 34)	Newell's Old Boys
31	Argentina	Gonzalo Escobar	LB	16 March 1997 (age 29)	Temperley
33	Argentina	Facundo Garcés	CB	5 September 1999 (age 27)	Academy
	Colombia	Andrés Cadavid	CB	28 December 1985 (age 40)	Millonarios
Midfielders
4	Argentina	Tomás Moschión	CM	2 June 2000 (age 26)	Academy
5	Argentina	Matías Fritzler	CM	23 August 1986 (age 40)	Huracán
7	Uruguay	Mauro Da Luz	MF	5 September 1994 (age 32)	River Plate
8	Argentina	Fernando Zuqui	RM	27 November 1991 (age 34)	Estudiantes
11	Colombia	Guillermo Celis	DM	8 May 1993 (age 33)	Vitória Guimarães (loan)
14	Argentina	Federico Lértora	CM	5 July 1990 (age 36)	Belgrano
18	Argentina	Gastón Díaz	RM	13 March 1988 (age 38)	Vélez Sarsfield
21	Argentina	Mateo Hernández	AM	5 October 1998 (age 28)	Academy
23	Argentina	Christian Bernardi	AM	10 March 1990 (age 36)	Instituto
25	Argentina	Braian Galván	RW	6 October 2000 (age 26)	Academy
27	Argentina	Brian Farioli	MF	19 February 1998 (age 28)	Academy
28	Paraguay	Marcelo Estigarribia	LM	21 September 1987 (age 39)	Deportivo Maldonado (loan)
29	Argentina	Rodrigo Aliendro	CM	16 February 1991 (age 35)	Atlético Tucumán
34	Argentina	Gabriel Esparza	RW	30 January 1993 (age 33)	San Lorenzo
	Argentina	Adrián Bastía	CM	20 December 1978 (age 47)	Atlético de Rafaela
Forwards
9	Argentina	Nicolás Leguizamón	CF	26 January 1995 (age 31)	Academy
10	Argentina	Luis Rodríguez	LW	1 January 1985 (age 41)	Atlético Tucumán
12	Argentina	Tomás Chancalay	RW	1 January 1999 (age 27)	Academy
19	Colombia	Wilson Morelo	CF	21 May 1987 (age 39)	Santa Fe
26	Argentina	Juan Cruz Zurbriggen	FW	12 May 2000 (age 26)	Academy
30	Argentina	Santiago Pierotti	FW	3 April 2001 (age 25)	Academy
32	Argentina	Tomás Sandoval	FW	30 March 1999 (age 27)	Academy
	Paraguay	Jorge Ortega	CF	16 April 1991 (age 35)	Olimpia
Out on loan					Loaned to
	Argentina	Joaquín Aylagas	GK	15 March 1996 (age 30)	Barnechea
	Argentina	Juan Bauza	AM	3 May 1996 (age 30)	Górnik Zabrze
	Argentina	Erik Godoy	CB	16 August 1993 (age 33)	Vancouver Whitecaps FC

== Transfers ==
Domestic transfer windows:
3 July 2019 to 24 September 2019
20 January 2020 to 19 February 2020.

=== Transfers in ===
Date from	Position	Nationality	Name	From	Ref.
3 July 2019 (Note: Deal agreed on 25 June 2019)	RM	Argentina	Gastón Díaz	Vélez Sarsfield (Note: Released by Vélez Sarsfield on 24 June.)	
3 July 2019 (Note: Deal agreed on 27 June 2019)	CM	Argentina	Rodrigo Aliendro	Atlético Tucumán	
4 July 2019	CB	Argentina	Lucas Acevedo	San Martín	
25 July 2019	CM	Argentina	Federico Lértora	Belgrano	
2 September 2019	CF	Paraguay	Jorge Ortega	Olimpia	

=== Transfers out ===
Date from	Position	Nationality	Name	To	Ref.
2 July 2019	AM	Argentina	Cristian Guanca	Al-Shabab	
3 July 2019 (Note: Deal agreed on 28 June 2019)	RB	Argentina	Gustavo Toledo	Atlético Tucumán	
22 July 2019	LW	Uruguay	Gonzalo Bueno	Almería	
25 July 2019	DM	Argentina	Franco Zuculini	Venezia	

=== Loans in ===
Start date	Position	Nationality	Name	From	End date	Ref.
23 July 2019	MF	Uruguay	Mauro Da Luz	River Plate	30 June 2020	

=== Loans out ===
Start date	Position	Nationality	Name	To	End date	Ref.
29 July 2019	RW	Argentina	Juan Bauza	Górnik Zabrze	30 June 2020	

== Friendlies ==
=== Pre-season ===
A three-team friendly tournament, named Cementerio de los Elefantes, was planned to take place at the end of June with Independiente and San Lorenzo but was later scrapped. On 14 June 2019, Colón announced a pre-season training camp would take place in Salta, with the club arranging a friendly fixtures at the Estadio 23 de Agosto against Gimnasia y Esgrima (J) of Primera B Nacional. A day later, Patronato revealed a match with Colón. On 29 June, Colón would face friendlies with Newell's Old Boys.

Win Draw Loss

22 June 2019 Friendly	Colón	0–1	Gimnasia y Esgrima (J)	Salta, Argentina
16:00 GMT-3		Sin Mordaza	D. López	Stadium: Estadio Padre Ernesto Martearena; Attendance: 0 (Note: Behind closed doors.)

22 June 2019 Friendly	Colón	4–0	Gimnasia y Esgrima (J)	Salta, Argentina
17:00 GMT-3	M. Hernández; W. Morelo; T. Sandoval	Agenciafe		Stadium: Estadio Padre Ernesto Martearena; Attendance: 0 (Note: Behind closed doors.)

29 June 2019 Friendly	Newell's Old Boys	1–1	Colón	Rosario, Argentina
	F. Fydriszewski	Newell's Old Boys; 70 min. match	C. Bernardi	Stadium: Estadio Marcelo Bielsa; Attendance: 0 (Note: Behind closed doors.)

29 June 2019 Friendly	Newell's Old Boys	0–1	Colón	Rosario, Argentina
		Newell's Old Boys; 70 min. match	N. Leguizamón (pen.)	Stadium: Estadio Marcelo Bielsa; Attendance: 0 (Note: Behind closed doors.)

5 July 2019 Friendly	Colón	0–1	Patronato	Santa Fe, Argentina
		Patronato; Aire de Santa Fe; 60 min. match	C. Tarragona	Stadium: Estadio Brigadier General Estanislao López

== Competitions ==
=== Primera División ===
==== League table ====
Pos	Team	Pld	W	D	L	GF	GA	GD	Pts
20	Patronato	23	5	8	10	22	34	−12	23
21	Huracán	23	5	7	11	17	27	−10	22
22	Aldosivi	23	6	4	13	20	35	−15	22
23	Colón	23	5	3	15	17	39	−22	18
24	Godoy Cruz	23	6	0	17	22	46	−24	18

Source: AFA
Rules for classification: 1) points; 2) play-off (only if needed to decide championship); 3) goal difference; 4) goals scored; 5) head-to-head points; 6) head-to-head goal difference; 7) head-to-head goals scored.

==== Relegation table ====
Pos	Team	2017–18 Pts	2018–19 Pts	2019–20 Pts	Total Pts	Total Pld	Avg	Relegation
19	Newell's Old Boys	29	29	9	67	56	1.196	
20	Banfield	35	29	4	68	57	1.193	
21	Colón	41	23	4	68	57	1.193	
22	Rosario Central	32	26	9	67	57	1.175	Relegation to Primera B Nacional
23	Central Córdoba (SdE)	0	0	5	5	5	1	Relegation to Primera B Nacional

Source: AFA

==== Results summary ====
Overall								Home						Away					
Pld	W	D	L	GF	GA	GD	Pts	W	D	L	GF	GA	GD	W	D	L	GF	GA	GD
5	1	1	3	3	7	−4	4	1	1	1	3	3	0	0	0	2	0	4	−4

Last updated: 1 September 2019.
Source: Soccerway

==== Matches ====
The fixtures for the 2019–20 campaign were released on 10 July.

Win Draw Loss

27 July 2019 1	Colón	0–1	Patronato	Santa Fe, Argentina
13:15 GMT-3		Colón; Infobae; Soccerway	C. Chimino 34'	Stadium: Estadio Brigadier General Estanislao López; Referee: Silvio Trucco (Argentina)

2 August 2019 2	Huracán	2–0	Colón	Buenos Aires, Argentina
21:00 GMT-3	R. Gómez 61' (pen.); F. Coniglio 90+2'	Colón; Infobae; Soccerway		Stadium: Estadio Tomás Adolfo Ducó; Referee: Hernán Mastrángelo (Argentina)

19 August 2019 3	Colón	2–1	Gimnasia y Esgrima (LP)	Santa Fe, Argentina
17:45 GMT-3	W. Morelo 40', 90+4'	Colón; Infobae; Soccerway	P. Velázquez 54'	Stadium: Estadio Brigadier General Estanislao López; Referee: Jorge Baliño (Argentina)

24 August 2019 4	Independiente	2–0	Colón	Avellaneda, Argentina
20:00 GMT-3	L. Acevedo 12' (o.g.); S. Romero 90+4'	Colón; Infobae; Soccerway		Stadium: Estadio Libertadores de América; Referee: Diego Abal (Argentina)

1 September 2019 5	Colón	1–1	Rosario Central	Santa Fe, Argentina
11:00 GMT-3	R. Aliendro 19'	Colón; Infobae; Soccerway	C. Riaño 41'	Stadium: Estadio Brigadier General Estanislao López; Referee: Fernando Espinoza (Argentina)

6	Colón	–	San Lorenzo	Santa Fe, Argentina
				Stadium: Estadio Brigadier General Estanislao López

=== Copa Argentina ===
Colón would face Sol de Mayo in the Copa Argentina round of thirty-two on 28 August 2019. After convincingly beating the Torneo Federal A outfit, they were then paired with Atlético Tucumán.

Win Draw Loss

28 August 2019 R32	Sol de Mayo	0–4	Colón	Rafaela, Argentina
14:40 GMT-3		Colón; Infobae; Soccerway	S. Pierotti 5'; M. Da Luz 21'; N. Leguizamón 39'; T. Chancalay 81'	Stadium: Estadio Nuevo Monumental; Referee: Ariel Penel (Argentina)

10 September 2019 R16	Colón	–	Atlético Tucumán	Paraná, Argentina
19:10 GMT-3				Stadium: Estadio Presbítero Bartolomé Grella

=== Copa de la Superliga ===
Win Draw Loss

	–
00:00 GMT-3

=== Copa Sudamericana ===
Colón's round of sixteen opponents in the Copa Sudamericana were revealed to be fellow Argentine Primera División team Argentinos Juniors. After advancing through that round, they were drawn with Venezuelan outfit Zulia. In the semi-finals, Colón would meet Brazilian outfit Atlético Mineiro.

Win Draw Loss

11 July 2019 R16 L1	Colón	0–1	Argentinos Juniors	Santa Fe, Argentina
21:30 GMT-3		Colón; La Nación; Soccerway	M. Romero 38'	Stadium: Estadio Brigadier General Estanislao López; Referee: Esteban Ostojich (Uruguay)

18 July 2019 R16 L2	Argentinos Juniors	0–1 (1–1 agg.) (3–4 p)	Colón	Buenos Aires, Argentina
21:30 GMT-3		Colón; Infobae; Soccerway	C. Bernardi 70'	Stadium: Estadio Diego Armando Maradona; Referee: Anderson Daronco (Brazil)
	Penalties
	S. Silva (penalty missed); D. Batallini (penalty missed); F. Montero (penalty scored); G. Hauche (penalty scored); M. Torrén (penalty scored); F. Mac Allister (penalty missed); E. Ybañez (penalty missed)		G. Ortiz (penalty missed); M. Fritzler (penalty missed); T. Chancalay (penalty scored); R. Aliendro (penalty scored); L. Rodríguez (penalty scored); C. Bernardi (penalty missed); E. Olivera (penalty scored)

8 August 2019 QF L1	Zulia	1–0	Colón	Maracaibo, Venezuela
16:00 GMT-4	A. Casquete 88'	Colón; Infobae; Soccerway		Stadium: Estadio José Pachencho Romero; Referee: Andrés Cunha (Uruguay)

15 August 2019 QF L2	Colón	4–0 (4–1 agg.)	Zulia	Santa Fe, Argentina
21:30 GMT-4	W. Morelo 47'; L. Rodríguez 65'; T. Chancalay 82'; F. Lértora 89'	Colón; Infobae; Soccerway		Stadium: Estadio Brigadier General Estanislao López; Referee: Eber Aquino (Paraguay)

19 September 2019 SF L1	Colón	–	Atlético Mineiro	Santa Fe, Argentina
21:30 GMT-4				Stadium: Estadio Brigadier General Estanislao López

26 September 2019 SF L2	Atlético Mineiro	–	Colón	Belo Horizonte, Brazil
21:30 GMT-4				Stadium: Estádio Independência

== Squad statistics ==
=== Appearances and goals ===
No.	Pos.	Nationality	Name	League		Cup		League Cup		Continental		Total		Discipline		Ref
No.	Pos.	Nationality	Name	Apps	Goals	Apps	Goals	Apps	Goals	Apps	Goals	Apps	Goals	Yellow card	Red card	Ref
1	GK	Uruguay	Leonardo Burián	5	0	1	0	0	0	3	0	9	0	0	0	
2	CB	Argentina	Lucas Acevedo	3	0	0	0	0	0	4	0	7	0	1	0	
3	LB	Argentina	Clemente Rodríguez	0	0	0	0	0	0	0	0	0	0	0	0	
4	CM	Argentina	Tomás Moschión	0	0	0	0	0	0	0	0	0	0	0	0	
5	CM	Argentina	Matías Fritzler	4	0	1	0	0	0	3(1)	0	8(1)	0	1	0	
6	CB	Argentina	Emanuel Olivera	4	0	0	0	0	0	4	0	8	0	3	0	
7	MF	Uruguay	Mauro Da Luz	1(3)	0	1	1	0	0	0	0	2(3)	1	0	0	
8	RM	Argentina	Fernando Zuqui	5	0	0	0	0	0	2	0	7	0	2	0	
9	CF	Argentina	Nicolás Leguizamón	2(1)	0	1	1	0	0	2(1)	0	5(2)	1	1	0	
10	LW	Argentina	Luis Rodríguez	3(1)	0	0	0	0	0	4	1	7(1)	1	2	0	
11	DM	Colombia	Guillermo Celis	0	0	0	0	0	0	0(2)	0	0(2)	0	0	0	
12	RW	Argentina	Tomás Chancalay	2(2)	0	1	1	0	0	0(3)	1	3(5)	2	1	0	
13	RB	Argentina	Alex Vigo	1	0	0	0	0	0	4	0	5	0	1	0	
14	CM	Argentina	Federico Lértora	3	0	0	0	0	0	2	1	5	1	3	0	
15	CB	Argentina	Damián Schmidt	1	0	1	0	0	0	0	0	2	0	0	0	
16	LB	Argentina	Franco Quiroz	0	0	0	0	0	0	0	0	0	0	0	0	
17	GK	Argentina	Ignacio Chicco	0	0	0	0	0	0	1	0	1	0	0	0	
18	RM	Argentina	Gastón Díaz	3	0	1	0	0	0	1	0	5	0	0	1	
19	CF	Colombia	Wilson Morelo	3(2)	2	0(1)	0	0	0	1(1)	1	4(4)	3	1	0	
21	AM	Argentina	Mateo Hernández	0	0	0	0	0	0	0	0	0	0	0	0	
22	GK	Argentina	Joaquín Hass	0	0	0	0	0	0	0	0	0	0	0	0	
23	AM	Argentina	Christian Bernardi	3(1)	0	1	0	0	0	4	1	8(1)	1	1	1	
24	CB	Argentina	Guillermo Ortiz	2	0	1	0	0	0	0(1)	0	3(1)	0	1	0	
25	FW	Argentina	Braian Galván	0	0	0	0	0	0	0	0	0	0	0	0	
26	FW	Argentina	Juan Cruz Zurbriggen	0	0	0	0	0	0	0	0	0	0	0	0	
27	MF	Argentina	Brian Farioli	0	0	0	0	0	0	0	0	0	0	0	0	
28	LM	Paraguay	Marcelo Estigarribia	3(2)	0	0(1)	0	0	0	2(1)	0	5(4)	0	0	0	
29	CM	Argentina	Rodrigo Aliendro	3(1)	1	0(1)	0	0	0	4	0	7(2)	1	1	0	
30	FW	Argentina	Santiago Pierotti	0(1)	0	1	1	0	0	0	0	1(1)	1	0	0	
31	LB	Argentina	Gonzalo Escobar	3	0	1	0	0	0	2(1)	0	6(1)	0	1	0	
32	FW	Argentina	Tomás Sandoval	0	0	0	0	0	0	0(1)	0	0(1)	0	0	0	
33	CB	Argentina	Facundo Garcés	0	0	0	0	0	0	0	0	0	0	0	0	
34	RW	Argentina	Gabriel Esparza	0	0	0	0	0	0	0	0	0	0	0	0	
–	GK	Argentina	Joaquín Aylagas	0	0	0	0	0	0	0	0	0	0	0	0	
–	CM	Argentina	Adrián Bastía	0	0	0	0	0	0	0	0	0	0	0	0	
–	AM	Argentina	Juan Bauza	0	0	0	0	0	0	0	0	0	0	0	0	
–	CB	Colombia	Andrés Cadavid	0	0	0	0	0	0	0	0	0	0	0	0	
–	CB	Argentina	Erik Godoy	0	0	0	0	0	0	0	0	0	0	0	0	
–	CF	Paraguay	Jorge Ortega	0	0	0	0	0	0	0	0	0	0	0	0	
Own goals				—	0	—	0	—	0	—	0	—	0	—	—	—

Statistics accurate as of 1 September 2019.

=== Goalscorers ===
Rank	Pos	No.	Nat	Name	League	Cup	League Cup	Continental	Total	Ref
1	CF	19	Colombia	Wilson Morelo	2	0	0	1	3	
1	RW	12	Argentina	Tomás Chancalay	0	1	0	1	2	
2	AM	23	Argentina	Christian Bernardi	0	0	0	1	1	
2	CM	14	Argentina	Federico Lértora	0	0	0	1	1	
2	LW	10	Argentina	Luis Rodríguez	0	0	0	1	1	
2	FW	30	Argentina	Santiago Pierotti	0	1	0	0	1	
2	MF	7	Uruguay	Mauro Da Luz	0	1	0	0	1	
2	CF	9	Argentina	Nicolás Leguizamón	0	1	0	0	1	
2	CM	29	Argentina	Rodrigo Aliendro	0	1	0	0	1	
Own goals					0	0	0	0	0	
Totals					2	4	0	5	11	—
