= 2019 Copa Sudamericana final stages =

The 2019 Copa Sudamericana final stages were played from 9 July to 9 November 2019. A total of 16 teams competed in the final stages to decide the champions of the 2019 Copa Sudamericana, with the final played in Asunción, Paraguay at the Estadio General Pablo Rojas.

== Qualified teams ==
The 16 winners of the second stage advanced to the round of 16.

=== Seeding ===
Starting from the round of 16, the teams were seeded according to the second stage draw, with each team assigned a "seed" 1–16 corresponding to the tie they won (O1–O16) (Regulations Article 22.c).

Seed	Match	Second stage winners
1	O1	(Colombia) La Equidad
2	O2	(Ecuador) Independiente del Valle
3	O3	(Brazil) Fluminense
4	O4	(Peru) Sporting Cristal
5	O5	(Argentina) Argentinos Juniors
6	O6	(Uruguay) Montevideo Wanderers
7	O7	(Ecuador) Universidad Católica
8	O8	(Brazil) Atlético Mineiro
9	O9	(Brazil) Botafogo
10	O10	(Argentina) Independiente
11	O11	(Brazil) Corinthians
12	O12	(Argentina) Colón
13	O13	(Venezuela) Zulia
14	O14	(Uruguay) Peñarol
15	O15	(Venezuela) Caracas
16	O16	(Bolivia) Royal Pari

== Format ==
Starting from the round of 16, the teams played a single-elimination tournament with the following rules:

- In the round of 16, quarter-finals, and semi-finals, each tie was played on a home-and-away two-legged basis, with the higher-seeded team hosting the second leg (Regulations Article 22.d). If tied on aggregate, the away goals rule was used. If still tied, extra time was not played, and a penalty shoot-out was used to determine the winner (Regulations Article 27).
- The final was played as a single match at a venue pre-selected by CONMEBOL, with the higher-seeded team designated as the "home" team for administrative purposes (Regulations Article 25). If tied after regulation, 30 minutes of extra time were played. If still tied after extra time, a penalty shoot-out was used to determine the winner (Regulations Article 28).

== Bracket ==
The bracket starting from the round of 16 was determined as follows:

Round	Matchups
Round of 16	(Higher-seeded team host second leg): Match A: Winner O1 vs. Winner O16; Match B: Winner O2 vs. Winner O15; Match C: Winner O3 vs. Winner O14; Match D: Winner O4 vs. Winner O13; Match E: Winner O5 vs. Winner O12; Match F: Winner O6 vs. Winner O11; Match G: Winner O7 vs. Winner O10; Match H: Winner O8 vs. Winner O9
Quarter-finals	(Higher-seeded team host second leg): Match S1: Winner A vs. Winner H; Match S2: Winner B vs. Winner G; Match S3: Winner C vs. Winner F; Match S4: Winner D vs. Winner E
Semi-finals	(Higher-seeded team host second leg): Match F1: Winner S1 vs. Winner S4; Match F2: Winner S2 vs. Winner S3
Finals	(Higher-seeded team designated as "home" team): Winner F1 vs. Winner F2

The bracket was decided based on the second stage draw, which was held on 13 May 2019.

Round of 16
11	(Brazil) Corinthians	2	2	4
6	(Uruguay) Montevideo Wanderers	0	1	1
14	(Uruguay) Peñarol	1	1	2
3	(Brazil) Fluminense	2	3	5
10	(Argentina) Independiente (a)	1	2	3
7	(Ecuador) Universidad Católica	0	3	3
15	(Venezuela) Caracas	0	0	0
2	(Ecuador) Independiente del Valle	0	2	2
13	(Venezuela) Zulia (a)	1	2	3
4	(Peru) Sporting Cristal	0	3	3
12	(Argentina) Colón (p)	0	1	1 (4)
5	(Argentina) Argentinos Juniors	1	0	1 (3)
9	(Brazil) Botafogo	0	0	0
8	(Brazil) Atlético Mineiro	1	2	3
16	(Bolivia) Royal Pari	1	1	2
1	(Colombia) La Equidad	2	2	4

Quarter-finals
11	(Brazil) Corinthians (a)	0	1	1
3	(Brazil) Fluminense	0	1	1
10	(Argentina) Independiente	2	0	2
2	(Ecuador) Independiente del Valle (a)	1	1	2
13	(Venezuela) Zulia	1	0	1
12	(Argentina) Colón	0	4	4
8	(Brazil) Atlético Mineiro	2	3	5
1	(Colombia) La Equidad	1	1	2

Semi-finals
11	(Brazil) Corinthians	0	2	2
2	(Ecuador) Independiente del Valle	2	2	4
12	(Argentina) Colón (p)	2	1	3 (4)
8	(Brazil) Atlético Mineiro	1	2	3 (3)

Final
9 November – Asunción
2	(Ecuador) Independiente del Valle	3
12	(Argentina) Colón	1

== Round of 16 ==
The first legs were played on 9–11 and 23–25 July, and the second legs were played on 16–18, 30–31 July and 1 August 2019.

Team 1	Agg.	Team 2	1st leg	2nd leg
Royal Pari (Bolivia)	2–4	(Colombia) La Equidad	1–2	1–2
Caracas (Venezuela)	0–2	(Ecuador) Independiente del Valle	0–0	0–2
Peñarol (Uruguay)	2–5	(Brazil) Fluminense	1–2	1–3
Zulia (Venezuela)	3–3 (a)	(Peru) Sporting Cristal	1–0	2–3
Colón (Argentina)	1–1 (4–3 p)	(Argentina) Argentinos Juniors	0–1	1–0
Corinthians (Brazil)	4–1	(Uruguay) Montevideo Wanderers	2–0	2–1
Independiente (Argentina)	3–3 (a)	(Ecuador) Universidad Católica	1–0	2–3
Botafogo (Brazil)	0–3	(Brazil) Atlético Mineiro	0–1	0–2

=== Match A ===
9 July 2019
20:30 UTC−4

Royal Pari (Bolivia)	1–2	(Colombia) La Equidad
Vargas 6'	Report	González 79', 89'

Estadio Ramón Tahuichi Aguilera, Santa Cruz de la Sierra
Referee: Arnaldo Samaniego (Paraguay)

16 July 2019
19:30 UTC−5

La Equidad (Colombia)	2–1	(Bolivia) Royal Pari
Riquett 76'; González 85'	Report	Mosquera 15'

Estadio El Campín, Bogotá (Note: La Equidad played their home matches at Estadio El Campín, Bogotá, instead of their regular stadium Estadio Metropolitano de Techo, Bogotá.)
Referee: Alexis Herrera (Venezuela)

La Equidad won 4–2 on aggregate and advanced to the quarter-finals (Match S1).

=== Match B ===
10 July 2019
16:00 UTC−4

Caracas (Venezuela)	0–0	(Ecuador) Independiente del Valle
	Report

Estadio Olímpico de la UCV, Caracas
Referee: Ivo Méndez (Bolivia)

17 July 2019
19:30 UTC−5

Independiente del Valle (Ecuador)	2–0	(Venezuela) Caracas
Franco 61'; Dájome 75'	Report

Estadio Olímpico Atahualpa, Quito (Note: Independiente del Valle played their home matches at Estadio Olímpico Atahualpa, Quito, instead of their regular stadium Estadio Rumiñahui, Sangolquí.)
Referee: Leodán González (Uruguay)

Independiente del Valle won 2–0 on aggregate and advanced to the quarter-finals (Match S2).

=== Match C ===
23 July 2019
21:30 UTC−3

Peñarol (Uruguay)	1–2	(Brazil) Fluminense
G. Rodríguez 89'	Report	González 15', 70'

Estadio Campeón del Siglo, Montevideo
Referee: Arnaldo Samaniego (Paraguay)

30 July 2019
21:30 UTC−3

Fluminense (Brazil)	3–1	(Uruguay) Peñarol
Marcos Paulo 1', 47'; González 25'	Report	Viatri 69'

Estádio do Maracanã, Rio de Janeiro
Attendance: 35,071
Referee: Patricio Loustau (Argentina)

Fluminense won 5–2 on aggregate and advanced to the quarter-finals (Match S3).

=== Match D ===
23 July 2019
16:00 UTC−4

Zulia (Venezuela)	1–0	(Peru) Sporting Cristal
Feltscher 59'	Report

Estadio José Pachencho Romero, Maracaibo
Referee: Éber Aquino (Paraguay)

30 July 2019
17:15 UTC−5

Sporting Cristal (Peru)	3–2	(Venezuela) Zulia
Sandoval 69', 90+5'; Gonzáles 74'	Report	Maldonado 12'; Moya 85'

Estadio Alejandro Villanueva, Lima (Note: Sporting Cristal played their home match at Estadio Alejandro Villanueva, Lima, instead of their regular stadium Estadio Alberto Gallardo, Lima.)
Referee: Anderson Daronco (Brazil)

Tied 3–3 on aggregate, Zulia won on away goals and advanced to the quarter-finals (Match S4).

=== Match E ===
11 July 2019
21:30 UTC−3

Colón (Argentina)	0–1	(Argentina) Argentinos Juniors
	Report	Romero 38'

Estadio Brigadier General Estanislao López, Santa Fe
Referee: Esteban Ostojich (Uruguay)

18 July 2019
21:30 UTC−3

Argentinos Juniors (Argentina)	0–1	(Argentina) Colón
	Report	Bernardi 69'
Penalties
Silva (penalty missed); Batallini (penalty missed); Montero (penalty scored); Hauche (penalty scored); Torrén (penalty scored); Mac Allister (penalty missed); Ybañez (penalty missed)	3–4	(penalty missed) Ortiz; (penalty missed) Fritzler; (penalty scored) Chancalay; (penalty scored) Aliendro; (penalty scored) Rodríguez; (penalty missed) Bernardi; (penalty scored) Olivera

Estadio Diego Armando Maradona, Buenos Aires
Referee: Anderson Daronco (Brazil)

Tied 1–1 on aggregate, Colón won on penalties and advanced to the quarter-finals (Match S4).

=== Match F ===
25 July 2019
21:30 UTC−3

Corinthians (Brazil)	2–0	(Uruguay) Montevideo Wanderers
Clayson 19'; Pedrinho 85'	Report

Arena Corinthians, São Paulo
Referee: José Argote (Venezuela)

1 August 2019
21:30 UTC−3

Montevideo Wanderers (Uruguay)	1–2	(Brazil) Corinthians
Bravo 49'	Report	Vágner Love 46', 60'

Estadio Gran Parque Central, Montevideo (Note: Montevideo Wanderers played their home match at Estadio Gran Parque Central, Montevideo, instead of their regular stadium Parque Alfredo Víctor Viera, Montevideo.)
Referee: Éber Aquino (Paraguay)

Corinthians won 4–1 on aggregate and advanced to the quarter-finals (Match S3).

=== Match G ===
25 July 2019
21:30 UTC−3

Independiente (Argentina)	1–0	(Ecuador) Universidad Católica
Hernández 55'	Report

Estadio Libertadores de América, Avellaneda
Referee: Jesús Valenzuela (Venezuela)

1 August 2019
19:30 UTC−5

Universidad Católica (Ecuador)	3–2	(Argentina) Independiente
Vides 19' (pen.); W. Chalá 78'; Amarilla 90+1'	Report	Benítez 51'; Hernández 71'

Estadio Olímpico Atahualpa, Quito
Referee: Piero Maza (Chile)

Tied 3–3 on aggregate, Independiente won on away goals and advanced to the quarter-finals (Match S2).

=== Match H ===
24 July 2019
21:30 UTC−3

Botafogo (Brazil)	0–1	(Brazil) Atlético Mineiro
	Report	Vinícius 35'

Estádio Olímpico Nilton Santos, Rio de Janeiro
Referee: Raphael Claus (Brazil)

31 July 2019
21:30 UTC−3

Atlético Mineiro (Brazil)	2–0	(Brazil) Botafogo
Fábio Santos 75' (pen.); Vinícius 85'	Report

Estádio Independência, Belo Horizonte
Referee: Wilton Sampaio (Brazil)

Atlético Mineiro won 3–0 on aggregate and advanced to the quarter-finals (Match S1).

== Quarter-finals ==
The first legs were played on 6, 8, 20 and 22 August, and the second legs were played on 13, 15, 27 and 29 August 2019.

Team 1	Agg.	Team 2	1st leg	2nd leg
Atlético Mineiro (Brazil)	5–2	(Colombia) La Equidad	2–1	3–1
Independiente (Argentina)	2–2 (a)	(Ecuador) Independiente del Valle	2–1	0–1
Corinthians (Brazil)	1–1 (a)	(Brazil) Fluminense	0–0	1–1
Zulia (Venezuela)	1–4	(Argentina) Colón	1–0	0–4

=== Match S1 ===
20 August 2019
21:30 UTC−3

Atlético Mineiro (Brazil)	2–1	(Colombia) La Equidad
Jair 27'; Elias 79'	Report	Camacho 7' (pen.)

Estádio Independência, Belo Horizonte
Referee: Mario Díaz de Vivar (Paraguay)

27 August 2019
19:30 UTC−5

La Equidad (Colombia)	1–3	(Brazil) Atlético Mineiro
Mier 47'	Report	Réver 19'; Chará 50'; Elias 76'

Estadio El Campín, Bogotá
Referee: Esteban Ostojich (Uruguay)

Atlético Mineiro won 5–2 on aggregate and advanced to the semi-finals (Match F1).

=== Match S2 ===
6 August 2019
21:30 UTC−3

Independiente (Argentina)	2–1	(Ecuador) Independiente del Valle
Romero 73' (pen.), 90'	Report	Sánchez 59'

Estadio Libertadores de América, Avellaneda
Referee: Diego Haro (Peru)

13 August 2019
19:30 UTC−5

Independiente del Valle (Ecuador)	1–0	(Argentina) Independiente
Nieto 77'	Report

Estadio Olímpico Atahualpa, Quito
Referee: Roberto Tobar (Chile)

Tied 2–2 on aggregate, Independiente del Valle won on away goals and advanced to the semi-finals (Match F2).

=== Match S3 ===
22 August 2019
21:30 UTC−3

Corinthians (Brazil)	0–0	(Brazil) Fluminense
	Report

Arena Corinthians, São Paulo
Attendance: 37,550
Referee: Andrés Rojas (Colombia)

29 August 2019
21:30 UTC−3

Fluminense (Brazil)	1–1	(Brazil) Corinthians
Pablo Dyego 83'	Report	Pedrinho 54'

Estádio do Maracanã, Rio de Janeiro
Referee: Diego Haro (Peru)

Tied 1–1 on aggregate, Corinthians won on away goals and advanced to the semi-finals (Match F2).

=== Match S4 ===
8 August 2019
16:00 UTC−4

Zulia (Venezuela)	1–0	(Argentina) Colón
Casquete 87'	Report

Estadio José Pachencho Romero, Maracaibo
Referee: Andrés Cunha (Uruguay)

15 August 2019
21:30 UTC−3

Colón (Argentina)	4–0	(Venezuela) Zulia
Morelo 46'; Rodríguez 65'; Chancalay 81'; Lértora 88'	Report

Estadio Brigadier General Estanislao López, Santa Fe
Referee: Éber Aquino (Paraguay)

Colón won 4–1 on aggregate and advanced to the semi-finals (Match F1).

== Semi-finals ==
The first legs were played on 18–19 September, and the second legs were played on 25–26 September 2019.

Team 1	Agg.	Team 2	1st leg	2nd leg
Colón (Argentina)	3–3 (4–3 p)	(Brazil) Atlético Mineiro	2–1	1–2
Corinthians (Brazil)	2–4	(Ecuador) Independiente del Valle	0–2	2–2

=== Match F1 ===
19 September 2019
21:30 UTC−3

Colón (Argentina)	2–1	(Brazil) Atlético Mineiro
Morelo 51'; Rodríguez 85'	Report	Chará 35'

Estadio Brigadier General Estanislao López, Santa Fe
Referee: Alexis Herrera (Venezuela)

26 September 2019
21:30 UTC−3

Atlético Mineiro (Brazil)	2–1	(Argentina) Colón
Di Santo 38'; Chará 50'	Report	Rodríguez 81' (pen.)
Penalties
Fábio Santos (penalty scored); Vinícius (penalty scored); Di Santo (penalty scored); Réver (penalty missed); Cazares (penalty missed)	3–4	(penalty missed) Morelo; (penalty scored) Ortiz; (penalty scored) Chancalay; (penalty scored) Olivera; (penalty scored) Rodríguez

Estádio Mineirão, Belo Horizonte (Note: Atlético Mineiro played their home match against Colón at Estádio Mineirão, Belo Horizonte, instead of their regular stadium Estádio Independência, Belo Horizonte.)
Referee: Andrés Rojas (Colombia)

Tied 3–3 on aggregate, Colón won on away goals and advanced to the final.

=== Match F2 ===
18 September 2019
21:30 UTC−3

Corinthians (Brazil)	0–2	(Ecuador) Independiente del Valle
	Report	Torres 45+2', 68'

Arena Corinthians, São Paulo
Referee: Leodán González (Uruguay)

25 September 2019
19:30 UTC−5

Independiente del Valle (Ecuador)	2–2	(Brazil) Corinthians
Sánchez 67'; Cabeza 90'	Report	Boselli 28'; Clayson 86' (pen.)

Estadio Olímpico Atahualpa, Quito
Referee: Piero Maza (Chile)

Independiente del Valle won 4–2 on aggregate and advanced to the final.

== Final ==
The final was played on 9 November 2019 at the Estadio General Pablo Rojas in Asunción.

9 November 2019
17:30 UTC−3

Independiente del Valle (Ecuador)	3–1	(Argentina) Colón
León 24'; Sánchez 41'; Dájome 90+5'	Report	Olivera 88'

Estadio General Pablo Rojas, Asunción
Attendance: 44,828
Referee: Raphael Claus (Brazil)
