= 2019 Copa Sudamericana second stage =

The 2019 Copa Sudamericana second stage was played from 21 to 30 May 2019. A total of 32 teams competed in the second stage to decide the 16 places in the final stages of the 2019 Copa Sudamericana.

== Draw ==
The draw for the second stage was held on 13 May 2019, 20:30 PYT (UTC−4), at the CONMEBOL Convention Centre in Luque, Paraguay. For the second stage, the teams were allocated to two pots according to their previous results in this season:

- Pot 1: 10 teams transferred from the Copa Libertadores and six best winners of the first stage from the Copa Sudamericana
- Pot 2: 16 remaining winners of the first stage from the Copa Sudamericana

The 32 teams were drawn into 16 ties (O1–O16) between a team from Pot 1 and a team from Pot 2, with the teams from Pot 1 hosting the second leg. Teams from the same association could be drawn into the same tie.

The following were the 10 teams transferred from the Copa Libertadores (two best teams eliminated in the third stage of qualifying and eight third-placed teams in the group stage).

| Match | Best teams eliminated in third stage | Second stage draw |
|---|---|---|
| G3 | (Colombia) Atlético Nacional | Pot 1 |
| G2 | (Venezuela) Caracas | Pot 1 |
| Group | Third-placed teams in group stage | Second stage draw |
| A | (Chile) Palestino | Pot 1 |
| B | (Venezuela) Deportivo Lara | Pot 1 |
| C | (Peru) Sporting Cristal | Pot 1 |
| D | (Uruguay) Peñarol | Pot 1 |
| E | (Brazil) Atlético Mineiro | Pot 1 |
| F | (Peru) Melgar | Pot 1 |
| G | (Colombia) Deportes Tolima | Pot 1 |
| H | (Chile) Universidad Católica | Pot 1 |

The following were the 22 winners of the first stage from the Copa Sudamericana. Matches in the first stage were considered for the ranking of teams for the second stage draw.

| Pos | Match | First stage winners | Pld | W | D | L | GF | GA | GD | Pts | Second stage draw |
|---|---|---|---|---|---|---|---|---|---|---|---|
| 1 | E6 | (Argentina) Colón | 2 | 2 | 0 | 0 | 5 | 0 | +5 | 6 | Pot 1 |
| 2 | E3 | (Argentina) Independiente | 2 | 2 | 0 | 0 | 6 | 2 | +4 | 6 | Pot 1 |
| 3 | E12 | (Ecuador) Macará | 2 | 2 | 0 | 0 | 5 | 1 | +4 | 6 | Pot 1 |
| 4 | E22 | (Brazil) Botafogo | 2 | 2 | 0 | 0 | 4 | 0 | +4 | 6 | Pot 1 |
| 5 | E8 | (Uruguay) Cerro | 2 | 1 | 1 | 0 | 4 | 2 | +2 | 4 | Pot 1 |
| 6 | E9 | (Paraguay) Deportivo Santaní | 2 | 1 | 1 | 0 | 3 | 1 | +2 | 4 (Note: Away goals scored: Deportivo Santaní 2, Montevideo Wanderers 1) | Pot 1 |
| 7 | E1 | (Uruguay) Montevideo Wanderers | 2 | 1 | 1 | 0 | 3 | 1 | +2 | 4 | Pot 2 |
| 8 | E20 | (Brazil) Fluminense | 2 | 1 | 1 | 0 | 2 | 1 | +1 | 4 | Pot 2 |
| 9 | E2 | (Uruguay) Liverpool | 2 | 1 | 1 | 0 | 1 | 0 | +1 | 4 | Pot 2 |
| 10 | E5 | (Argentina) Argentinos Juniors | 2 | 1 | 0 | 1 | 2 | 1 | +1 | 3 | Pot 2 |
| 11 | E13 | (Bolivia) Royal Pari | 2 | 1 | 0 | 1 | 3 | 3 | 0 | 3 | Pot 2 |
| 12 | E21 | (Ecuador) Independiente del Valle | 2 | 1 | 0 | 1 | 2 | 2 | 0 | 3 | Pot 2 |
| 13 | E17 | (Venezuela) Zulia | 2 | 1 | 0 | 1 | 1 | 1 | 0 | 3 (Note: CONMEBOL ranking: Zulia 91, Universidad Católica 148) | Pot 2 |
| 14 | E10 | (Ecuador) Universidad Católica | 2 | 1 | 0 | 1 | 1 | 1 | 0 | 3 | Pot 2 |
| 15 | E16 | (Colombia) Deportivo Cali | 2 | 1 | 0 | 1 | 1 | 1 | 0 | 3 (Note: CONMEBOL ranking: Deportivo Cali 45, Sol de América 112) | Pot 2 |
| 16 | E14 | (Paraguay) Sol de América | 2 | 1 | 0 | 1 | 1 | 1 | 0 | 3 | Pot 2 |
| 17 | E18 | (Brazil) Corinthians | 2 | 0 | 2 | 0 | 2 | 2 | 0 | 2 (Note: CONMEBOL ranking: Corinthians 11, Unión Española 50, Rionegro Águilas unranked) | Pot 2 |
| 18 | E7 | (Chile) Unión Española | 2 | 0 | 2 | 0 | 2 | 2 | 0 | 2 | Pot 2 |
| 19 | E4 | (Colombia) Rionegro Águilas | 2 | 0 | 2 | 0 | 2 | 2 | 0 | 2 | Pot 2 |
| 20 | E11 | (Uruguay) River Plate | 2 | 0 | 2 | 0 | 1 | 1 | 0 | 2 (Note: CONMEBOL ranking: River Plate 105, Unión La Calera unranked) | Pot 2 |
| 21 | E15 | (Chile) Unión La Calera | 2 | 0 | 2 | 0 | 1 | 1 | 0 | 2 | Pot 2 |
| 22 | E19 | (Colombia) La Equidad | 2 | 0 | 2 | 0 | 0 | 0 | 0 | 2 | Pot 2 |

Source: CONMEBOL
Rules for classification: 1) Points; 2) Goal difference; 3) Goals scored; 4) Away goals scored; 5) CONMEBOL ranking (Regulations Article 21).

== Format ==
In the second stage, each tie was played on a home-and-away two-legged basis. If tied on aggregate, the away goals rule was used. If still tied, extra time was not played, and a penalty shoot-out was used to determine the winner (Regulations Article 27).

The 16 winners of the second stage advanced to the round of 16 of the final stages.

== Matches ==
The first legs were played on 21–23 May, and the second legs were played on 28–30 May 2019.

| Team 1 | Agg. | Team 2 | 1st leg | 2nd leg |
|---|---|---|---|---|
| La Equidad (Colombia) | 4–1 | (Paraguay) Deportivo Santaní | 2–0 | 2–1 |
| Independiente del Valle (Ecuador) | 7–3 | (Chile) Universidad Católica | 5–0 | 2–3 |
| Fluminense (Brazil) | 4–2 | (Colombia) Atlético Nacional | 4–1 | 0–1 |
| Unión Española (Chile) | 0–6 | (Peru) Sporting Cristal | 0–3 | 0–3 |
| Argentinos Juniors (Argentina) | 1–0 | (Colombia) Deportes Tolima | 1–0 | 0–0 |
| Montevideo Wanderers (Uruguay) | 1–0 | (Uruguay) Cerro | 0–0 | 1–0 |
| Universidad Católica (Ecuador) | 6–0 | (Peru) Melgar | 6−0 | 0–0 |
| Unión La Calera (Chile) | 1–1 (0–3 p) | (Brazil) Atlético Mineiro | 1–0 | 0–1 |
| Sol de América (Paraguay) | 0–5 | (Brazil) Botafogo | 0–1 | 0–4 |
| Rionegro Águilas (Colombia) | 3–4 | (Argentina) Independiente | 3–2 | 0–2 |
| Corinthians (Brazil) | 4–0 | (Venezuela) Deportivo Lara | 2–0 | 2–0 |
| River Plate (Uruguay) | 1–3 | (Argentina) Colón | 0−0 | 1–3 |
| Zulia (Venezuela) | 3–1 | (Chile) Palestino | 2−1 | 1–0 |
| Deportivo Cali (Colombia) | 1–3 | (Uruguay) Peñarol | 1–1 | 0–2 |
| Liverpool (Uruguay) | 1–2 | (Venezuela) Caracas | 1–0 | 0–2 |
| Royal Pari (Bolivia) | 3–3 (a) | (Ecuador) Macará | 1−0 | 2–3 |

=== Match O1 ===
22 May 2019
19:30 UTC−5

| La Equidad (Colombia) | 2–0 | (Paraguay) Deportivo Santaní |
|---|---|---|
| Zapata 28'; Peralta 67' | Report |

Estadio El Campín, Bogotá (Note: La Equidad played their home match at Estadio El Campín, Bogotá, instead of their regular stadium Estadio Metropolitano de Techo, Bogotá.)
Referee: Ivo Méndez (Bolivia)

29 May 2019
20:30 UTC−4

| Deportivo Santaní (Paraguay) | 1–2 | (Colombia) La Equidad |
|---|---|---|
| González 90+1' | Report | Zapata 70'; Peralta 84' |

Estadio Defensores del Chaco, Asunción (Note: Deportivo Santaní played their home match at Estadio Defensores del Chaco, Asunción, instead of their regular stadium Estadio Juan José Vázquez, San Estanislao.)
Referee: Ángel Arteaga (Venezuela)

La Equidad won 4–1 on aggregate and advanced to the round of 16 (Match A).

=== Match O2 ===
23 May 2019
19:30 UTC−5

| Independiente del Valle (Ecuador) | 5–0 | (Chile) Universidad Católica |
|---|---|---|
| Cabeza 1', 12'; Pellerano 10' (pen.); Landázuri 20'; Dájome 58' | Report |

Estadio Olímpico Atahualpa, Quito (Note: Independiente del Valle played their home match at Estadio Olímpico Atahualpa, Quito, instead of their regular stadium Estadio Rumiñahui, Sangolquí.)
Referee: Andrés Cunha (Uruguay)

30 May 2019
20:30 UTC−4

| Universidad Católica (Chile) | 3–2 | (Ecuador) Independiente del Valle |
|---|---|---|
| Cornejo 23'; Riascos 32'; Preciado 73' (o.g.) | Report | Franco 3'; Dájome 85' |

Estadio San Carlos de Apoquindo, Santiago
Referee: Carlos Herrera (Colombia)

Independiente del Valle won 7–3 on aggregate and advanced to the round of 16 (Match B).

=== Match O3 ===
23 May 2019
21:30 UTC−3

| Fluminense (Brazil) | 4–1 | (Colombia) Atlético Nacional |
|---|---|---|
| João Pedro 2', 8', 33'; Luciano 11' | Report | Barcos 17' (pen.) |

Estádio do Maracanã, Rio de Janeiro
Attendance: 28,441
Referee: Roberto Tobar (Chile)

29 May 2019 (Note: The Atlético Nacional v Fluminense match was originally scheduled for 30 May 2019, 17:15 local time, but was re-scheduled to 29 May 2019, 19:30 local time.)
19:30 UTC−5

| Atlético Nacional (Colombia) | 1–0 | (Brazil) Fluminense |
|---|---|---|
| Barcos 3' | Report |

Estadio Atanasio Girardot, Medellín
Referee: Patricio Loustau (Argentina)

Fluminense won 4–2 on aggregate and advanced to the round of 16 (Match C).

=== Match O4 ===
21 May 2019
20:30 UTC−4

| Unión Española (Chile) | 0–3 | (Peru) Sporting Cristal |
|---|---|---|
| | Report | Gonzáles 6'; Ortiz 66', 71' |

Estadio Santa Laura, Santiago
Referee: Guillermo Guerrero (Ecuador)

28 May 2019
19:30 UTC−5

| Sporting Cristal (Peru) | 3–0 | (Chile) Unión Española |
|---|---|---|
| Palacios 26' (pen.); Ortiz 43'; Gonzáles 51' (pen.) | Report |

Estadio Alejandro Villanueva, Lima (Note: Sporting Cristal played their home match at Estadio Alejandro Villanueva, Lima (originally to be played at Estadio Nacional, Lima), instead of their regular stadium Estadio Alberto Gallardo, Lima.)
Referee: Arnaldo Samaniego (Paraguay)

Sporting Cristal won 6–0 on aggregate and advanced to the round of 16 (Match D).

=== Match O5 ===
23 May 2019
21:30 UTC−3

| Argentinos Juniors (Argentina) | 1–0 | (Colombia) Deportes Tolima |
|---|---|---|
| Quintana 90+3' | Report |

Estadio Diego Armando Maradona, Buenos Aires
Referee: Daniel Fedorczuk (Uruguay)

30 May 2019 (Note: The Deportes Tolima v Argentinos Juniors match was originally scheduled for 30 May 2019, 19:30 local time, but was re-scheduled to 17:15 local time.)
17:15 UTC−5

| Deportes Tolima (Colombia) | 0–0 | (Argentina) Argentinos Juniors |
|---|---|---|
| | Report |

Estadio Manuel Murillo Toro, Ibagué
Referee: Anderson Daronco (Brazil)

Argentinos Juniors won 1–0 on aggregate and advanced to the round of 16 (Match E).

=== Match O6 ===
23 May 2019
19:15 UTC−3

| Montevideo Wanderers (Uruguay) | 0–0 | (Uruguay) Cerro |
|---|---|---|
| | Report |

Parque Alfredo Víctor Viera, Montevideo
Referee: Darío Herrera (Argentina)

30 May 2019
19:15 UTC−3

| Cerro (Uruguay) | 0–1 | (Uruguay) Montevideo Wanderers |
|---|---|---|
| | Report | Pastorini 33' |

Estadio Luis Franzini, Montevideo (Note: Cerro played their home match at Estadio Luis Franzini, Montevideo, instead of their regular stadium Estadio Luis Tróccoli, Montevideo.)
Referee: Facundo Tello (Argentina)

Montevideo Wanderers won 1–0 on aggregate and advanced to the round of 16 (Match F).

=== Match O7 ===
21 May 2019
17:15 UTC−5

| Universidad Católica (Ecuador) | 6−0 | (Peru) Melgar |
|---|---|---|
| Carcelén 24'; J. Chalá 30'; Vides 41' (pen.); W. Chalá 56'; B. Oña 77'; Cortéz 90+1' | Report |

Estadio Olímpico Atahualpa, Quito
Referee: Ángel Arteaga (Venezuela)

28 May 2019
17:15 UTC−5

| Melgar (Peru) | 0−0 | (Ecuador) Universidad Católica |
|---|---|---|
| | Report |

Estadio Monumental de la UNSA, Arequipa
Referee: Dewson Freitas (Brazil)

Universidad Católica won 6–0 on aggregate and advanced to the round of 16 (Match G).

=== Match O8 ===
21 May 2019
20:30 UTC−4

| Unión La Calera (Chile) | 1–0 | (Brazil) Atlético Mineiro |
|---|---|---|
| Lobos 63' | Report |

Estadio Nicolás Chahuán Nazar, La Calera
Referee: Roddy Zambrano (Ecuador)

28 May 2019
21:30 UTC−3

| Atlético Mineiro (Brazil) | 1–0 | (Chile) Unión La Calera |
|---|---|---|
| Alerrandro 69' | Report |
Penalties
| Santos (penalty scored); Luan (penalty scored); Silva (penalty scored) | 3–0 | (penalty missed) Bou; (penalty missed) Leyton; (penalty missed) Larrondo |

Estádio Independência, Belo Horizonte (Note: Atlético Mineiro played their home match at their regular stadium Estádio Independência, Belo Horizonte, instead of the originally scheduled venue Estádio Mineirão, Belo Horizonte.)
Referee: Daniel Fedorczuk (Uruguay)

Tied 1–1 on aggregate, Atlético Mineiro won on penalties and advanced to the round of 16 (Match H).

=== Match O9 ===
22 May 2019
18:15 UTC−4

| Sol de América (Paraguay) | 0–1 | (Brazil) Botafogo |
|---|---|---|
| | Report | Erik 72' |

Estadio Luis Alfonso Giagni, Villa Elisa
Referee: Germán Delfino (Argentina)

29 May 2019
19:15 UTC−3

| Botafogo (Brazil) | 4–0 | (Paraguay) Sol de América |
|---|---|---|
| Cícero 7'; Luiz Fernando 28'; Gustavo Bochecha 52'; Diego Souza 71' | Report |

Estádio Olímpico Nilton Santos, Rio de Janeiro
Referee: Esteban Ostojich (Uruguay)

Botafogo won 5–0 on aggregate and advanced to the round of 16 (Match H).

=== Match O10 ===
21 May 2019
19:30 UTC−5

| Rionegro Águilas (Colombia) | 3–2 | (Argentina) Independiente |
|---|---|---|
| Gómez 22'; K. Salazar 45'; Obrian 58' | Report | Domínguez 20'; Romero 65' |

Estadio Alberto Grisales, Rionegro
Referee: Éber Aquino (Paraguay)

28 May 2019
19:15 UTC−3 (Note: The Independiente v Rionegro Águilas match was originally scheduled for 28 May 2019, 21:30 local time, but was re-scheduled to 19:15 local time.)

| Independiente (Argentina) | 2–0 | (Colombia) Rionegro Águilas |
|---|---|---|
| Romero 47'; Domínguez 59' | Report |

Estadio Libertadores de América, Avellaneda
Referee: Mario Díaz de Vivar (Paraguay)

Independiente won 4–3 on aggregate and advanced to the round of 16 (Match G).

=== Match O11 ===
23 May 2019
19:15 UTC−3

| Corinthians (Brazil) | 2–0 | (Venezuela) Deportivo Lara |
|---|---|---|
| Vágner Love 59'; Gustavo 72' | Report |

Arena Corinthians, São Paulo
Referee: Cristian Garay (Chile)

30 May 2019
16:00 UTC−4

| Deportivo Lara (Venezuela) | 0–2 | (Brazil) Corinthians |
|---|---|---|
| | Report | Júnior Urso 32'; Sornoza 54' |

Estadio Metropolitano de Cabudare, Cabudare
Referee: Wilmar Roldán (Colombia)

Corinthians won 4–0 on aggregate and advanced to the round of 16 (Match F).

=== Match O12 ===
21 May 2019
19:15 UTC−3

| River Plate (Uruguay) | 0−0 | (Argentina) Colón |
|---|---|---|
| | Report |

Estadio Centenario, Montevideo (Note: River Plate played their home match at Estadio Centenario, Montevideo (originally to be played at Estadio Luis Franzini, Montevideo), instead of their regular stadium Parque Federico Omar Saroldi, Montevideo.)
Referee: Mario Díaz de Vivar (Paraguay)

28 May 2019
19:15 UTC−3

| Colón (Argentina) | 3–1 | (Uruguay) River Plate |
|---|---|---|
| Bernardi 17'; Morelo 24'; Leguizamón 85' | Report | Da Luz 15' |

Estadio Brigadier General Estanislao López, Santa Fe
Referee: Ricardo Marques (Brazil)

Colón won 3–1 on aggregate and advanced to the round of 16 (Match E).

=== Match O13 ===
22 May 2019
16:00 UTC−4

| Zulia (Venezuela) | 2−1 | (Chile) Palestino |
|---|---|---|
| Moya 12', 90+4' | Report | Díaz 90+2' |

Estadio José Pachencho Romero, Maracaibo
Referee: Gustavo Murillo (Colombia)

29 May 2019
18:15 UTC−4

| Palestino (Chile) | 0–1 | (Venezuela) Zulia |
|---|---|---|
| | Report | Hernández 77' (pen.) |

Estadio Nacional Julio Martínez Prádanos, Santiago (Note: Palestino played their home match at Estadio Nacional Julio Martínez Prádanos, Santiago, instead of their regular stadium Estadio Municipal de La Cisterna, Santiago.)
Referee: Roddy Zambrano (Ecuador)

Zulia won 3–1 on aggregate and advanced to the round of 16 (Match D).

=== Match O14 ===
22 May 2019
17:15 UTC−5

| Deportivo Cali (Colombia) | 1–1 | (Uruguay) Peñarol |
|---|---|---|
| Rodríguez 90' | Report | G. Rodríguez 62' |

Estadio Deportivo Cali, Palmira
Referee: Anderson Daronco (Brazil)

29 May 2019
19:15 UTC−3

| Peñarol (Uruguay) | 2–0 | (Colombia) Deportivo Cali |
|---|---|---|
| Canobbio 49'; Gargano 72' | Report |

Estadio Campeón del Siglo, Montevideo
Referee: Néstor Pitana (Argentina)

Peñarol won 3–1 on aggregate and advanced to the round of 16 (Match C).

=== Match O15 ===
22 May 2019
21:30 UTC−3

| Liverpool (Uruguay) | 1–0 | (Venezuela) Caracas |
|---|---|---|
| Bajter 89' | Report |

Estadio Luis Franzini, Montevideo (Note: Liverpool played their home match at Estadio Luis Franzini, Montevideo, instead of their regular stadium Estadio Belvedere, Montevideo.)
Referee: Rodolpho Toski (Brazil)

28 May 2019
16:00 UTC−4

| Caracas (Venezuela) | 2–0 | (Uruguay) Liverpool |
|---|---|---|
| Arrieta 63'; Andreutti 81' | Report |

Estadio Olímpico de la UCV, Caracas
Referee: Nicolás Gallo (Colombia)

Caracas won 2–1 on aggregate and advanced to the round of 16 (Match B).

=== Match O16 ===
21 May 2019
18:15 UTC−4

| Royal Pari (Bolivia) | 1−0 | (Ecuador) Macará |
|---|---|---|
| Mosquera 48' | Report |

Estadio Ramón Tahuichi Aguilera, Santa Cruz de la Sierra
Referee: Michael Espinoza (Peru)

29 May 2019
19:30 UTC−5

| Macará (Ecuador) | 3–2 | (Bolivia) Royal Pari |
|---|---|---|
| De La Cruz 21' (pen.); Corozo 28'; Ciampichetti 83' (pen.) | Report | Milano 33'; Chávez 90+4' |

Estadio Bellavista, Ambato
Referee: José Argote (Venezuela)

Tied 3–3 on aggregate, Royal Pari won on away goals and advanced to the round of 16 (Match A).
