= Farioli (surname) =

Farioli is an Italian surname. Notable people with the surname include:

- Brian Farioli (born 1998), Argentine footballer
- Filippo Farioli (born 2005), Italian motorcycle racer
- Francesco Farioli (born 1989), Italian football manager
