= Zurbriggen =

Zurbriggen is a surname. Notable people with the surname include:

- Bernadette Zurbriggen (born 1956), Swiss alpine skier
- Edwin Zurbriggen, Swiss para-alpine skier
- Hans Zurbriggen (1920–1950), Swiss ski jumper
- Heidi Zurbriggen (born 1967), Swiss alpine skier
- Juan Cruz Zurbriggen (born 2000), Argentine footballer
- Matthias Zurbriggen (1856–1917), 19th-century alpinist and mountain guide
- Peter Stephan Zurbriggen (1943-2022), Swiss archbishop of the Catholic Church
- Pirmin Zurbriggen (born 1963), Swiss alpine skier
- Robert Zurbriggen (1917–1952), Swiss cross-country skier and biathlete
- Santiago Zurbriggen (born 1990), Argentine footballer
- Silvan Zurbriggen (born 1981), Swiss alpine skier

== See also ==
- 145562 Zurbriggen, a main-belt asteroid
