= 2019 Copa Sudamericana =

Copa CONMEBOL Sudamericana 2019
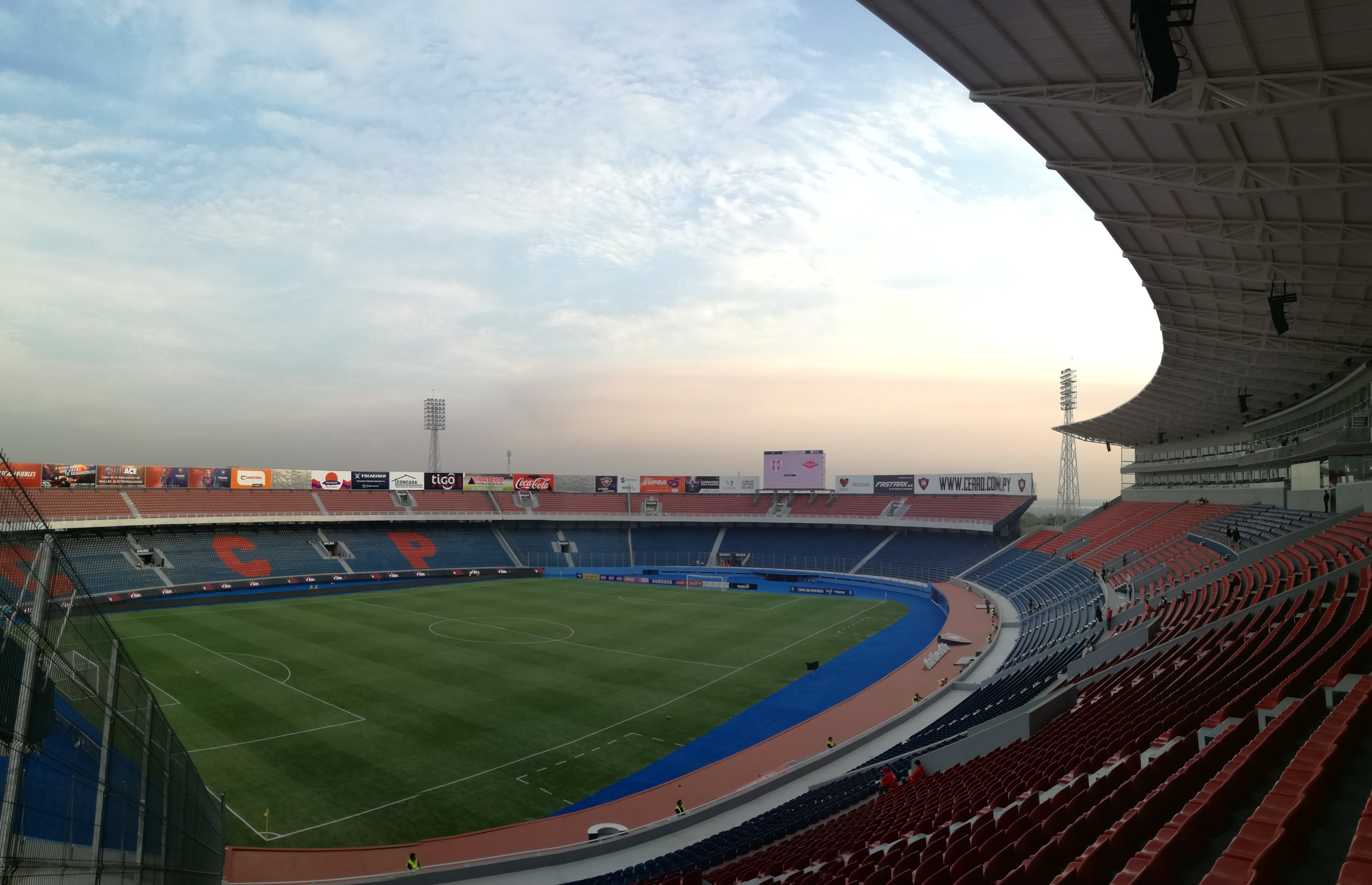
- The Estadio General Pablo Rojas in Asunción hosted the final

Tournament details
- Dates: 5 February – 9 November 2019
- Teams: 44+10 (from 10 associations)

Final positions
- Champions: (Ecuador) Independiente del Valle (1st title)
- Runners-up: (Argentina) Colón

Tournament statistics
- Matches played: 105
- Goals scored: 221 (2.1 per match)
- Top scorer(s): (Argentina) Silvio Romero (5 goals)

The 2019 Copa CONMEBOL Sudamericana was the 18th edition of the CONMEBOL Sudamericana (also referred to as the Copa Sudamericana, or Portuguese: Copa Sul-Americana), South America's secondary club football tournament organized by CONMEBOL.

Ecuadorian club Independiente del Valle defeated Argentine club Colón by a 3–1 score in the final to win their first tournament title. As champions, Independiente del Valle earned the right to play against the winners of the 2019 Copa Libertadores in the 2020 Recopa Sudamericana. They also automatically qualified for the 2020 Copa Libertadores group stage. They would also have played the winners of the 2019 J.League Cup in the 2020 J.League Cup / Copa Sudamericana Championship, but it would not be held due to the 2020 Tokyo Olympics scheduled at the same time.

On 14 August 2018, CONMEBOL decided that starting from the 2019 edition, the final will be played as a single match, and although it was originally stated that the final would be played in Lima, Peru at the Estadio Nacional, on 9 May 2019 the confederation's Council decided to switch the venue to Estadio Defensores del Chaco in Asunción, Paraguay. On 21 June 2019, APF announced that Estadio General Pablo Rojas in Asunción will host the 2019 final due to remodeling works at the Estadio Defensores del Chaco.

Athletico Paranaense were the defending champions, but did not play this edition as they qualified for the 2019 Copa Libertadores group stage as Copa Sudamericana champions and later advanced to the knockout stage.

== Teams ==
The following 44 teams from the 10 CONMEBOL associations qualified for the tournament, entering the first stage:

- Argentina and Brazil: 6 berths each
- All other associations: 4 berths each

Association	Team (Berth)	Qualification method
Argentina (6 berths)	Independiente (Argentina 1)	2017–18 Superliga Argentina best team not qualified for 2019 Copa Libertadores
Argentina (6 berths)	Racing (Argentina 2)	2017–18 Superliga Argentina 2nd best team not qualified for 2019 Copa Libertadores
Argentina (6 berths)	Defensa y Justicia (Argentina 3)	2017–18 Superliga Argentina 3rd best team not qualified for 2019 Copa Libertadores
Argentina (6 berths)	Unión (Argentina 4)	2017–18 Superliga Argentina 4th best team not qualified for 2019 Copa Libertadores
Argentina (6 berths)	Colón (Argentina 5)	2017–18 Superliga Argentina 5th best team not qualified for 2019 Copa Libertadores
Argentina (6 berths)	Argentinos Juniors (Argentina 6)	2017–18 Superliga Argentina 6th best team not qualified for 2019 Copa Libertadores
Bolivia (4 berths)	Royal Pari (Bolivia 1)	2018 Primera División aggregate table best team not qualified for 2019 Copa Libertadores
Bolivia (4 berths)	Oriente Petrolero (Bolivia 2)	2018 Primera División aggregate table 2nd best team not qualified for 2019 Copa Libertadores
Bolivia (4 berths)	Nacional Potosí (Bolivia 3)	2018 Primera División aggregate table 3rd best team not qualified for 2019 Copa Libertadores
Bolivia (4 berths)	Guabirá (Bolivia 4)	2018 Apertura Copa Sudamericana playoff winners
Brazil (6 berths)	Botafogo (Brazil 1)	2018 Campeonato Brasileiro Série A best team not qualified for 2019 Copa Libertadores
Brazil (6 berths)	Santos (Brazil 2)	2018 Campeonato Brasileiro Série A 2nd best team not qualified for 2019 Copa Libertadores
Brazil (6 berths)	Bahia (Brazil 3)	2018 Campeonato Brasileiro Série A 3rd best team not qualified for 2019 Copa Libertadores
Brazil (6 berths)	Fluminense (Brazil 4)	2018 Campeonato Brasileiro Série A 4th best team not qualified for 2019 Copa Libertadores
Brazil (6 berths)	Corinthians (Brazil 5)	2018 Campeonato Brasileiro Série A 5th best team not qualified for 2019 Copa Libertadores
Brazil (6 berths)	Chapecoense (Brazil 6)	2018 Campeonato Brasileiro Série A 6th best team not qualified for 2019 Copa Libertadores
Chile (4 berths)	Deportes Antofagasta (Chile 1)	2018 Primera División best team not qualified for 2019 Copa Libertadores
Chile (4 berths)	Colo-Colo (Chile 2)	2018 Primera División 2nd best team not qualified for 2019 Copa Libertadores
Chile (4 berths)	Unión La Calera (Chile 3)	2018 Primera División 3rd best team not qualified for 2019 Copa Libertadores
Chile (4 berths)	Unión Española (Chile 4)	2018 Primera División 4th best team not qualified for 2019 Copa Libertadores
Colombia (4 berths)	Once Caldas (Colombia 1)	2018 Primera A aggregate table best team not qualified for 2019 Copa Libertadores
Colombia (4 berths)	La Equidad (Colombia 2)	2018 Primera A aggregate table 2nd best team not qualified for 2019 Copa Libertadores
Colombia (4 berths)	Rionegro Águilas (Colombia 3)	2018 Primera A aggregate table 3rd best team not qualified for 2019 Copa Libertadores
Colombia (4 berths)	Deportivo Cali (Colombia 4)	2018 Primera A aggregate table 4th best team not qualified for 2019 Copa Libertadores
Ecuador (4 berths)	Universidad Católica (Ecuador 1)	2018 Serie A aggregate table best team not qualified for 2019 Copa Libertadores
Ecuador (4 berths)	Macará (Ecuador 2)	2018 Serie A aggregate table 2nd best team not qualified for 2019 Copa Libertadores
Ecuador (4 berths)	Independiente del Valle (Ecuador 3)	2018 Serie A aggregate table 3rd best team not qualified for 2019 Copa Libertadores
Ecuador (4 berths)	Mushuc Runa (Ecuador 4)	2018 Serie A Copa Sudamericana playoff winners
Paraguay (4 berths)	Sol de América (Paraguay 1)	2018 Primera División aggregate table best team not qualified for 2019 Copa Libertadores
Paraguay (4 berths)	Independiente (Paraguay 2)	2018 Primera División aggregate table 2nd best team not qualified for 2019 Copa Libertadores
Paraguay (4 berths)	Deportivo Santaní (Paraguay 3)	2018 Primera División aggregate table 3rd best team not qualified for 2019 Copa Libertadores
Paraguay (4 berths)	Guaraní (Paraguay 4)	2018 Copa Paraguay champions
Peru (4 berths)	Deportivo Municipal (Peru 1)	2018 Torneo Descentralizado aggregate table best team not qualified for 2019 Copa Libertadores
Peru (4 berths)	Sport Huancayo (Peru 2)	2018 Torneo Descentralizado aggregate table 2nd best team not qualified for 2019 Copa Libertadores
Peru (4 berths)	UTC (Peru 3)	2018 Torneo Descentralizado aggregate table 3rd best team not qualified for 2019 Copa Libertadores
Peru (4 berths)	Binacional (Peru 4)	2018 Torneo Descentralizado aggregate table 4th best team not qualified for 2019 Copa Libertadores
Uruguay (4 berths)	Cerro (Uruguay 1)	2018 Primera División aggregate table best team not qualified for 2019 Copa Libertadores
Uruguay (4 berths)	Liverpool (Uruguay 2)	2018 Primera División aggregate table 2nd best team not qualified for 2019 Copa Libertadores
Uruguay (4 berths)	Montevideo Wanderers (Uruguay 3)	2018 Primera División aggregate table 3rd best team not qualified for 2019 Copa Libertadores
Uruguay (4 berths)	River Plate (Uruguay 4)	2018 Primera División aggregate table 4th best team not qualified for 2019 Copa Libertadores
Venezuela (4 berths)	Zulia (Venezuela 1)	2018 Copa Venezuela champions
Venezuela (4 berths)	Mineros de Guayana (Venezuela 2)	2018 Apertura runners-up
Venezuela (4 berths)	Monagas (Venezuela 3)	2018 Clausura classification table best team not qualified for 2019 Copa Libertadores
Venezuela (4 berths)	Estudiantes de Mérida (Venezuela 4)	2018 Primera División aggregate table best team not qualified for 2019 Copa Libertadores

A further 10 teams eliminated from the 2019 Copa Libertadores were transferred to the Copa Sudamericana, entering the second stage.

Best teams eliminated in third stage
(Colombia) Atlético Nacional
(Venezuela) Caracas
Third-placed teams in group stage
(Chile) Palestino
(Venezuela) Deportivo Lara
(Peru) Sporting Cristal
(Uruguay) Peñarol
(Brazil) Atlético Mineiro
(Peru) Melgar
(Colombia) Deportes Tolima
(Chile) Universidad Católica

== Schedule ==
The schedule of the competition was as follows. After changing the dates of the 2019 Copa América, the Brazilian Football Confederation released on 3 October 2018 its calendar for the following year, with new dates for the Copa Sudamericana.

Stage	Draw date	First leg	Second leg
First stage	17 December 2018 (Luque, Paraguay)	5–7 February 2019; 12–14 February 2019; 19–21 March 2019; 2–4 April 2019	19–21 February 2019; 26–28 February 2019; 16–18 April 2019; 30 April – 2 & 8 May 2019
Second stage	13 May 2019 (Luque, Paraguay)	21–23 May 2019	28–30 May 2019
Round of 16	13 May 2019 (Luque, Paraguay)	23–25 July 2019	30 July – 1 August 2019
Quarter-finals	13 May 2019 (Luque, Paraguay)	20–22 August 2019	27–29 August 2019
Semi-finals	13 May 2019 (Luque, Paraguay)	18–19 September 2019	25–26 September 2019
Final	13 May 2019 (Luque, Paraguay)	9 November 2019 at Estadio General Pablo Rojas, Asunción	

== Draws ==
Location of teams of the 2019 Copa Sudamericana.
(L) Teams transferred from the 2019 Copa Libertadores

The draw for the first stage was held on 17 December 2018, 20:30 PYST (UTC−3), at the CONMEBOL Convention Centre in Luque, Paraguay. For the first stage, the teams were divided into two pots according to their geographical zones:

- Pot A (South Zone): 22 teams from Argentina, Bolivia, Chile, Paraguay, and Uruguay
- Pot B (North Zone): 22 teams from Brazil, Colombia, Ecuador, Peru, and Venezuela

The 44 teams were drawn into 22 ties (E1–E22) between a team from Pot A and a team from Pot B, with the teams from Pot B hosting the second leg in odd-numbered ties, and the teams from Pot A hosting the second leg in even-numbered ties. This distribution ensured that teams from the same association could not be drawn into the same tie. The draw for the second stage was held on 13 May 2019, 20:30 PYT (UTC−4), at the CONMEBOL Convention Centre in Luque, Paraguay. For the second stage, the teams were allocated to two pots according to their previous results in this season:

- Pot 1: 10 teams transferred from the Copa Libertadores and six best winners of the first stage from the Copa Sudamericana
- Pot 2: 16 remaining winners of the first stage from the Copa Sudamericana

The 32 teams were drawn into 16 ties (O1–O16) between a team from Pot 1 and a team from Pot 2, with the teams from Pot 1 hosting the second leg. Teams from the same association could be drawn into the same tie.

== First stage ==
In the first stage, each tie was played on a home-and-away two-legged basis. If tied on aggregate, the away goals rule was used. If still tied, extra time was not played, and a penalty shoot-out was used to determine the winner (Regulations Article 27).

The 22 winners of the first stage advanced to the second stage to join the 10 teams transferred from the Copa Libertadores (two best teams eliminated in the third stage of qualifying and eight third-placed teams in the group stage).

Team 1	Agg.	Team 2	1st leg	2nd leg
Montevideo Wanderers (Uruguay)	3–1	(Peru) Sport Huancayo	2–0	1–1
Bahia (Brazil)	0–1	(Uruguay) Liverpool	0–1	0–0
Independiente (Argentina)	6–2	(Peru) Binacional	4–1	2–1
Rionegro Águilas (Colombia)	2–2 (3–0 p)	(Bolivia) Oriente Petrolero	1–1	1–1
Argentinos Juniors (Argentina)	2–1	(Venezuela) Estudiantes de Mérida	2–0	0–1
Deportivo Municipal (Peru)	0–5	(Argentina) Colón	0–3	0–2
Unión Española (Chile)	2–2 (6–5 p)	(Ecuador) Mushuc Runa	1–1	1–1
UTC (Peru)	2–4	(Uruguay) Cerro	1–1	1–3
Deportivo Santaní (Paraguay)	3–1	(Colombia) Once Caldas	1–1	2–0
Universidad Católica (Ecuador)	1–1 (3–0 p)	(Chile) Colo-Colo	0–1	1–0
River Plate (Uruguay)	1–1 (a)	(Brazil) Santos	0–0	1–1
Macará (Ecuador)	5–1	(Bolivia) Guabirá	2–1	3–0
Royal Pari (Bolivia)	3–3 (4–2 p)	(Venezuela) Monagas	2–1	1–2
Mineros de Guayana (Venezuela)	1–1 (3–4 p)	(Paraguay) Sol de América	1–0	0–1
Unión La Calera (Chile)	1–1 (a)	(Brazil) Chapecoense	0–0	1–1
Deportivo Cali (Colombia)	1–1 (4–1 p)	(Paraguay) Guaraní	1–0	0–1
Nacional Potosí (Bolivia)	1–1 (0–2 p)	(Venezuela) Zulia	0–1	1–0
Corinthians (Brazil)	2–2 (5–4 p)	(Argentina) Racing	1–1	1–1
Independiente (Paraguay)	0–0 (3–4 p)	(Colombia) La Equidad	0–0	0–0
Fluminense (Brazil)	2–1	(Chile) Deportes Antofagasta	0–0	2–1
Unión (Argentina)	2–2 (2–4 p)	(Ecuador) Independiente del Valle	2–0	0–2
Botafogo (Brazil)	4–0	(Argentina) Defensa y Justicia	1–0	3–0

== Second stage ==
In the second stage, each tie was played on a home-and-away two-legged basis. If tied on aggregate, the away goals rule was used. If still tied, extra time was not played, and a penalty shoot-out was used to determine the winner (Regulations Article 27).

The 16 winners of the second stage advanced to the round of 16 of the final stages.

Team 1	Agg.	Team 2	1st leg	2nd leg
La Equidad (Colombia)	4–1	(Paraguay) Deportivo Santaní	2–0	2–1
Independiente del Valle (Ecuador)	7–3	(Chile) Universidad Católica	5–0	2–3
Fluminense (Brazil)	4–2	(Colombia) Atlético Nacional	4–1	0–1
Unión Española (Chile)	0–6	(Peru) Sporting Cristal	0–3	0–3
Argentinos Juniors (Argentina)	1–0	(Colombia) Deportes Tolima	1–0	0–0
Montevideo Wanderers (Uruguay)	1–0	(Uruguay) Cerro	0–0	1–0
Universidad Católica (Ecuador)	6–0	(Peru) Melgar	6−0	0–0
Unión La Calera (Chile)	1–1 (0–3 p)	(Brazil) Atlético Mineiro	1–0	0–1
Sol de América (Paraguay)	0–5	(Brazil) Botafogo	0–1	0–4
Rionegro Águilas (Colombia)	3–4	(Argentina) Independiente	3–2	0–2
Corinthians (Brazil)	4–0	(Venezuela) Deportivo Lara	2–0	2–0
River Plate (Uruguay)	1–3	(Argentina) Colón	0−0	1–3
Zulia (Venezuela)	3–1	(Chile) Palestino	2−1	1–0
Deportivo Cali (Colombia)	1–3	(Uruguay) Peñarol	1–1	0–2
Liverpool (Uruguay)	1–2	(Venezuela) Caracas	1–0	0–2
Royal Pari (Bolivia)	3–3 (a)	(Ecuador) Macará	1−0	2–3

== Final stages ==
Starting from the round of 16, the teams played a single-elimination tournament with the following rules:

- In the round of 16, quarter-finals, and semi-finals, each tie was played on a home-and-away two-legged basis, with the higher-seeded team hosting the second leg (Regulations Article 22.d). If tied on aggregate, the away goals rule was used. If still tied, extra time was not played, and a penalty shoot-out was used to determine the winner (Regulations Article 27).
- The final was played as a single match at a venue pre-selected by CONMEBOL, with the higher-seeded team designated as the "home" team for administrative purposes (Regulations Article 25). If tied after regulation, 30 minutes of extra time were played. If still tied after extra time, a penalty shoot-out was used to determine the winner (Regulations Article 28).

=== Seeding ===
Starting from the round of 16, the teams were seeded according to the second stage draw, with each team assigned a "seed" 1–16 corresponding to the tie they won (O1–O16) (Regulations Article 22.c).

=== Bracket ===
The bracket was decided based on the second stage draw, which was held on 13 May 2019.

Round of 16
11	(Brazil) Corinthians	2	2	4
6	(Uruguay) Montevideo Wanderers	0	1	1
14	(Uruguay) Peñarol	1	1	2
3	(Brazil) Fluminense	2	3	5
10	(Argentina) Independiente (a)	1	2	3
7	(Ecuador) Universidad Católica	0	3	3
15	(Venezuela) Caracas	0	0	0
2	(Ecuador) Independiente del Valle	0	2	2
13	(Venezuela) Zulia (a)	1	2	3
4	(Peru) Sporting Cristal	0	3	3
12	(Argentina) Colón (p)	0	1	1 (4)
5	(Argentina) Argentinos Juniors	1	0	1 (3)
9	(Brazil) Botafogo	0	0	0
8	(Brazil) Atlético Mineiro	1	2	3
16	(Bolivia) Royal Pari	1	1	2
1	(Colombia) La Equidad	2	2	4

Quarter-finals
11	(Brazil) Corinthians (a)	0	1	1
3	(Brazil) Fluminense	0	1	1
10	(Argentina) Independiente	2	0	2
2	(Ecuador) Independiente del Valle (a)	1	1	2
13	(Venezuela) Zulia	1	0	1
12	(Argentina) Colón	0	4	4
8	(Brazil) Atlético Mineiro	2	3	5
1	(Colombia) La Equidad	1	1	2

Semi-finals
11	(Brazil) Corinthians	0	2	2
2	(Ecuador) Independiente del Valle	2	2	4
12	(Argentina) Colón (p)	2	1	3 (4)
8	(Brazil) Atlético Mineiro	1	2	3 (3)

Final
9 November – Asunción
2	(Ecuador) Independiente del Valle	3
12	(Argentina) Colón	1

=== Round of 16 ===
Team 1	Agg.	Team 2	1st leg	2nd leg
Royal Pari (Bolivia)	2–4	(Colombia) La Equidad	1–2	1–2
Caracas (Venezuela)	0–2	(Ecuador) Independiente del Valle	0–0	0–2
Peñarol (Uruguay)	2–5	(Brazil) Fluminense	1–2	1–3
Zulia (Venezuela)	3–3 (a)	(Peru) Sporting Cristal	1–0	2–3
Colón (Argentina)	1–1 (4–3 p)	(Argentina) Argentinos Juniors	0–1	1–0
Corinthians (Brazil)	4–1	(Uruguay) Montevideo Wanderers	2–0	2–1
Independiente (Argentina)	3–3 (a)	(Ecuador) Universidad Católica	1–0	2–3
Botafogo (Brazil)	0–3	(Brazil) Atlético Mineiro	0–1	0–2

=== Quarter-finals ===
Team 1	Agg.	Team 2	1st leg	2nd leg
Atlético Mineiro (Brazil)	5–2	(Colombia) La Equidad	2–1	3–1
Independiente (Argentina)	2–2 (a)	(Ecuador) Independiente del Valle	2–1	0–1
Corinthians (Brazil)	1–1 (a)	(Brazil) Fluminense	0–0	1–1
Zulia (Venezuela)	1–4	(Argentina) Colón	1–0	0–4

=== Semi-finals ===
Team 1	Agg.	Team 2	1st leg	2nd leg
Colón (Argentina)	3–3 (4–3 p)	(Brazil) Atlético Mineiro	2–1	1–2
Corinthians (Brazil)	2–4	(Ecuador) Independiente del Valle	0–2	2–2

=== Final ===
9 November 2019
17:30 UTC−3

Independiente del Valle (Ecuador)	3–1	(Argentina) Colón
León 24'; Sánchez 41'; Dájome 90+5'	Report	Olivera 88'

Estadio General Pablo Rojas, Asunción
Attendance: 44,828
Referee: Raphael Claus (Brazil)

== Statistics ==
=== Top scorers ===
Rank	Player	Team	1S1	1S2	2S1	2S2	⅛F1	⅛F2	QF1	QF2	SF1	SF2	F	Total
1	(Argentina) Silvio Romero	(Argentina) Independiente	1		1	1			2					5
2	(Ecuador) Alejandro Cabeza	(Ecuador) Independiente del Valle		1	2							1		4
2	(Colombia) Cristian Dájome	(Ecuador) Independiente del Valle			1	1		1					1	4
2	(Brazil) Erik	(Brazil) Botafogo	1	2	1									4
2	(Honduras) Brayan Moya	(Venezuela) Zulia	1		2			1						4
2	(Argentina) Luis Miguel Rodríguez	(Argentina) Colón		1						1	1	1		4
2	(Brazil) Vágner Love	(Brazil) Corinthians		1	1			2						4

Source: CONMEBOL.com

=== Top assists ===
Rank	Player	Team	Assists
1	(Argentina) Luis Miguel Rodríguez	(Argentina) Colón	4
2	(Ecuador) Alejandro Cabeza	(Ecuador) Independiente del Valle	3
2	(Colombia) Yony González	(Brazil) Fluminense	3
2	(Argentina) Cristian Pellerano	(Ecuador) Independiente del Valle	3
2	(Bolivia) Omar Siles	(Bolivia) Royal Pari	3
2	(Colombia) Armando Vargas	(Colombia) La Equidad	3

Source: CONMEBOL.com

== See also ==
- 2019 Copa Libertadores
- 2020 Recopa Sudamericana
