= Carlos Rodríguez (Colombian footballer) =

Colombian footballer

Personal information
- Full name: Carlos Mario Rodríguez Torres
- Date of birth: January 30, 1995 (age 31)
- Place of birth: Fonseca, Colombia
- Height: 1.80 m (5 ft 11 in)
- Position: Midfielder

Team information
- Current team: Atlético Huila

Senior career*
Years	Team	Apps	(Gls)
2012–2015	Millonarios	0	(0)
2013	→ Atlético Cali (loan)	15	(3)
2015–	Fortaleza CEIF	43	(8)
2017	→ Puebla (loan)	2	(0)
2019	→ Deportivo Cali (loan)	38	(4)
2020–2021	→ La Equidad (loan)		
2022–	Atlético Huila		
- * Club domestic league appearances and goals as of 9 June 2020

Carlos Mario Rodríguez Torres (born January 30, 1995) is a Colombian professional footballer who plays as a midfielder for Atlético Huila.
