= Adrián Bastía =

Argentine footballer (born 1978)

Personal information
- Full name: Adrián Jesús Bastía
- Date of birth: December 20, 1978 (age 47)
- Place of birth: Gobernador Crespo, Argentina
- Height: 1.78 m (5 ft 10 in)
- Position: Defensive midfielder

Team information
- Current team: Central Norte (manager)

Senior career*
Years	Team	Apps	(Gls)
1997–2003	Racing Club	156	(8)
2003	Espanyol	8	(0)
2004	FC Saturn	15	(0)
2005	Estudiantes de La Plata	35	(1)
2006–2008	Racing Club	45	(1)
2008–2011	Asteras Tripolis	73	(5)
2011–2013	Colón	58	(0)
2013–2015	Atlético de Rafaela	57	(3)
2016–2019	Colón	52	(2)
Total		499	(20)

Managerial career
- 2025–: Central Norte
- * Club domestic league appearances and goals

Adrián Jesús Bastía (born 20 December 1978 in Gobernador Crespo, Santa Fe) is an Argentine football manager and former player who played as a midfielder. He is the current manager of Central Norte.

== Career ==
Bastía started his playing career in 1997 with Racing Club. He was part of the squad that won the 2001 Apertura, Racing Club's first league title in 35 years and their first major title of any description since 1988.

In 2003, Bastía joined Espanyol in Spain but only played eight games for the club before joining FC Saturn in Moscow in 2004, where he was once suspended for eight games.

In 2005 Bastía returned to Argentina, playing for Estudiantes de La Plata before returning to Racing Club in 2006. In 2008, playing for Asteras Tripolis in Greece, Bastía received international fame when, on an away match against Panathinaikos, he tackled a pitch invader and received a red card.

In 2011, Bastía returned to Argentina after three years in Greece, joining Colón. In 2013, he joined Atletico de Rafaela after not being valued by Colón coach Rubén Forestello.

At the end of April 2019, Bastá terminated his contract with Colón and retired.

== Honours ==
Season	Team	Title
2001 Apertura	Racing Club	Primera División Argentina
