= Ignacio Chicco =

Argentine footballer (born 1996)

Personal information
- Full name: Ignacio Francisco Chicco
- Date of birth: 30 June 1996 (age 30)
- Place of birth: Brinkmann, Argentina
- Height: 1.83 m (6 ft 0 in)
- Position: Goalkeeper

Team information
- Current team: Aldosivi
- Number: 23

Youth career
- Deportivo Brinkmann
- 2010–2016: Colón

Senior career*
Years	Team	Apps	(Gls)
2016–2024	Colón	64	(0)
2016–2017	→ Talleres (loan)	0	(0)
2024–2026	Belgrano	10	(0)
2026–	Aldosivi	6	(0)
- * Club domestic league appearances and goals as of 17:49, 6 November 2026 (UTC)

Ignacio Francisco Chicco (born 30 June 1996) is an Argentine professional footballer who plays as a goalkeeper for Aldosivi.

== Career ==
Chicco, after a stint with local team Deportivo Brinkmann, joined the ranks of Colón in 2010. In August 2016, Chicco was loaned to fellow Primera División team Talleres. He didn't make a competitive appearance for the Córdoba outfit, though was an unused substitute on nine occasions. Chicco returned to Colón ahead of the 2017–18 campaign. He'd be on the bench forty times for them across the following three seasons. Chicco belatedly made his bow in professional football on 8 August 2019, appearing for the full duration of a Copa Sudamericana first leg loss in Venezuela to Zulia.

In January 2024, Chicco joined Belgrano on a three-year contract.

== Personal life ==
Chicco's brother, Julián, is also a professional footballer. The two played against each other at youth level in January 2018.

== Career statistics ==
As of 8 August 2019.

Appearances and goals by club, season and competition
Club	Season	League			Cup		League Cup		Continental		Other		Total	
Club	Season	Division	Apps	Goals	Apps	Goals	Apps	Goals	Apps	Goals	Apps	Goals	Apps	Goals
Colón	2016–17	Primera División	0	0	0	0	—		—		0	0	0	0
Colón	2017–18	Primera División	0	0	0	0	—		0	0	0	0	0	0
Colón	2018–19	Primera División	0	0	0	0	0	0	0	0	0	0	0	0
Colón	2019–20	Primera División	0	0	0	0	0	0	1 (Note: Appearance(s) in the Copa Sudamericana)	0	0	0	1	0
Colón	Total		0	0	0	0	0	0	1	0	0	0	1	0
Talleres (loan)	2016–17	Primera División	0	0	0	0	—		—		0	0	0	0
Career total			0	0	0	0	0	0	1	0	0	0	1	0
