= Alexis González (Paraguayan footballer) =

Paraguayan footballer (born 1992)

Personal information
- Full name: Alexis Joel González Belotto
- Date of birth: 7 January 1992 (age 34)
- Place of birth: Eusebio Ayala, Paraguay
- Height: 1.75 m (5 ft 9 in)
- Position: Defensive midfielder

Team information
- Current team: Nacional
- Number: 24

Youth career
- General Díaz
- Acosta Ñu
- 2008–2011: Cerro Porteño

Senior career*
Years	Team	Apps	(Gls)
2011–2017	Cerro Porteño	52	(0)
2016	→ Sportivo Luqueño (loan)	33	(1)
2017–2018	Deportivo Capiatá	22	(0)
2019	Deportivo Santaní	18	(0)
2019–	Nacional	7	(1)
- * Club domestic league appearances and goals as of 3 March 2016

Alexis Joel González Belotto (born 7 January 1992) is a Paraguayan footballer who plays as a defensive midfielder for Club Nacional.

== Club career ==
Born in Eusebio Ayala, González joined Cerro Porteño's youth setup in 2008, aged 16. On 28 September 2011, he made his first team debut, starting in a 4–2 away win against General Caballero.

After being regularly used during the 2012 campaign, González fell down the pecking order in the following years. On 15 January 2016, after being strongly linked to Alianza Lima, he joined Sportivo Luqueño on loan until the end of the year.
