= Damián Schmidt =

Argentine footballer

Personal information
- Full name: Héctor Damián Schmidt
- Date of birth: 7 December 1992 (age 33)
- Place of birth: Argentina
- Height: 1.83 m (6 ft 0 in)
- Position: Centre-back

Youth career
- Instituto

Senior career*
Years	Team	Apps	(Gls)
2013–2015	Instituto	72	(3)
2016	Racing Club	1	(0)
2016–2017	Puebla	6	(0)
2017–2018	San Martín SJ	11	(0)
2018–2019	San Martín T.	4	(0)
2019–2020	Colón	5	(0)
2020–2021	Macará	24	(1)
2022	Martina	2	(2)
- * Club domestic league appearances and goals

Héctor Damián Schmidt (born 7 December 1992) is an Argentine retired professional footballer.
