= Gastón Díaz =

Argentine footballer

Personal information
- Full name: Ricardo Gastón Díaz
- Date of birth: March 13, 1988 (age 38)
- Place of birth: Buenos Aires, Argentina
- Height: 1.75 m (5 ft 9 in)
- Position: Right back

Youth career
- –2008: Vélez Sársfield

Senior career*
| Years | Team | Apps | (Gls) |
| 2008–2013 | Vélez Sársfield | 86 | (0) |
| 2012–2013 | → Lanús (loan) | 12 | (0) |
| 2013–2014 | Gimnasia (LP) | 29 | (2) |
| 2014–2017 | Racing Club | 71 | (3) |
| 2017–2019 | Vélez Sársfield | 24 | (0) |
| 2019–2020 | Colón | 9 | (0) |

International career
| 2011 | Argentina | 1 | (0) |
- * Club domestic league appearances and goals as of 22:23, 23 September 2020 (UTC)

Ricardo Gastón Díaz (born 13 March 1988) is an Argentine football right back or right winger.

== Club career ==
Díaz made his debut for Vélez Sársfield on February 9, 2008. He featured rarely during the 2008–09 season, being a substitute for Fabián Cubero in the position of right back. However, he finished the second half of the season (2009 Clausura) as a starter as the team's right winger, also playing in the final game against Huracán, when Vélez obtained the national championship. Díaz played a total of 9 games during the team's championship winning campaign. The night subsequent to the championship final, Díaz had a car accident while driving under the influence of alcohol.

Díaz featured more regularly during the 2009–10 Argentine Primera División season and the 2010 Copa Libertadores. He usually played as right back, with Fabián Cubero starting on the right wing.

In 2014 Díaz joined Racing Club. In the first fixture of the 2014 Transición he made three assists in the team's victory against Defensa y Justicia (two to Gabriel Hauche and one to Diego Milito), thus becoming the man of the match. He then assisted Luciano Lollo in the 2–0 victory against San Lorenzo de Almagro. In the ninth fixture, Racing faced Belgrano and Díaz made his fifth assist in the tournament after sending a precise head to scorer Gustavo Bou. Against Estudiantes de La Plata, he assisted Diego Milito to score on a 4–0 victory. The winger scored his first goal against Rosario Central, to help on a 3–0 win for the 18th fixture. On the last fixture game against Godoy Cruz, Díaz assisted teammate Ricardo Centurión to score the goal that would give Racing the national title after 13 years. In that tournament he played in all 19 games, and made one goal and seven assists, making him the player with the most assists in the championship.

Días returned to Vélez Sarsfield for the 2017–18 Argentine Primera División, on a free transfer. Ahead of the 2019/20 season, Días joined Club Atlético Colón. He left the club again at the end of the season.

== International career ==
Díaz was on the preliminary squad for the 2008 Summer Olympics. However, he was not part of the final selection.

In January 2010, he was called by Argentina's coach Diego Maradona for an Argentine league-based squad to play a friendly match against Costa Rica. Díaz was an unused substitute during the game. In November of that year, he was called by Sergio Batista, Maradona's replacement as Argentina's head coach, for another squad of local league players to train twice weekly with the national representative. He debuted with the national team entering the field in a 4–1 victory over Venezuela, on March 16, 2011.

== Honours ==
Vélez Sársfield

- Argentine Primera División (2): 2009 Clausura, 2011 Clausura

Racing Club

- Argentine Primera División (1): 2014 Transición
