= Jhon Jairo Sánchez =

Ecuadorian football player (born 1999)

Jhon Sánchez
Personal information
- Full name: Jhon Jairo Sánchez Enriquez
- Date of birth: 30 July 1999 (age 27)
- Place of birth: Manta, Ecuador
- Height: 1.75 m (5 ft 9 in)
- Position: Winger

Team information
- Current team: C.S. Emelec

Senior career*
Years	Team	Apps	(Gls)
2013–2016	Manta F.C.	0	(0)
2017–	Independiente del Valle	94	(10)
2021–2022	→ Vasco da Gama (loan)	9	(0)
- * Club domestic league appearances and goals

Jhon Jairo Sánchez Enriquez (born 30 July 1999 in Ecuador) is an Ecuadorian footballer who play as a winger for C.S. Emelec.

== Career ==
In an interview with Elcomercio.com, Sánchez stated that he is not a goalscorer and prefers to support his teammates. He also said that he did not expect to play in an international club tournament (the 2019 Copa Sudamericana) so soon with Independiente del Valle, having played in the second division beforehand.

In 2020, Sánchez was listed in World Soccer magazine's 500 Most Important Players.

On August 30, 2021, Sánchez was announced for Vasco da Gama on loan from Independiente del Valle.

== Honours ==
Independiente del Valle

- Copa Sudamericana: 2019
- Ecuadorian Serie A: 2021
