= Franco Quiroz =

Argentine footballer

Personal information
- Full name: Franco Nicolás Quiroz
- Date of birth: 11 March 1998 (age 28)
- Place of birth: Concordia, Argentina
- Height: 1.77 m (5 ft 10 in)
- Position: Left-back

Team information
- Current team: All Boys

Youth career
- Monseñor Rösch
- Wanderers de Concordia

Senior career*
Years	Team	Apps	(Gls)
- Wanderers de Concordia
2015–2020	Colón	8	(0)
2020	→ Agropecuario (loan)	0	(0)
2020	General Díaz	3	(0)
2021–2022	San Telmo	27	(1)
2022–2023	→ San Martín T. (loan)	10	(0)
2023–2024	Chacarita Juniors	32	(0)
2024–2025	Atlético de Rafaela	23	(1)
2025–2026	San Martín T.	8	(0)
2026–	All Boys	5	(0)
- * Club domestic league appearances and goals as of 17:37, 25 March 2026 (UTC)

Franco Nicolás Quiroz (born 11 March 1998) is an Argentine professional footballer who plays as a left-back for All Boys.

== Career ==
Quiroz began playing at an early age for the youth of Monseñor Rösch, who preceded spells in the academies of Wanderers de Concordia, where he made his senior bow as a fifteen-year-old, and Colón. In his senior career with Colón, he was an unused substitute on six occasions for the club in 2017 and 2018 - four of which came in Primera División matches while the other two occurred in the Copa Sudamericana in mid-2018 for ties with São Paulo and Atlético Junior. His professional bow eventually arrived on 28 January 2019, with the defender completing the full ninety minutes of a 2–0 victory over Argentinos Juniors.

After nine appearances for Colón, Quiroz departed on loan in January 2020 to Primera B Nacional's Agropecuario. He didn't make an appearance in the second tier, before returning to his parent club in June. In October 2020, Quiroz terminated his contract with Colón and soon moved to Paraguayan Primera División club General Díaz. He debuted in a 4–3 home defeat to Libertad on 11 November, featuring for fifty-six minutes before being replaced by Diego Doldán.

On 1 March 2021, Quiroz returned to his homeland and joined San Telmo. In January 2022, Quiroz joined San Martín de Tucumán on a loan deal until the end of 2023 with a purchase option. In January 2023, Quiroz joined Chacarita Juniors on a one-year deal. Ahead of the 2024 season, Quiroz joined Atlético de Rafaela.

== Career statistics ==
As of 29 December 2020.

Club statistics
Club	Season	League			Cup		League Cup		Continental		Other		Total	
Club	Season	Division	Apps	Goals	Apps	Goals	Apps	Goals	Apps	Goals	Apps	Goals	Apps	Goals
Colón	2015	Argentine Primera División	0	0	0	0	—		—		0	0	0	0
Colón	2016	Argentine Primera División	0	0	0	0	—		—		0	0	0	0
Colón	2016–17	Argentine Primera División	0	0	0	0	—		—		0	0	0	0
Colón	2017–18	Argentine Primera División	0	0	0	0	—		0	0	0	0	0	0
Colón	2018–19	Argentine Primera División	5	0	0	0	0	0	0	0	0	0	5	0
Colón	2019–20	Argentine Primera División	3	0	1	0	0	0	—		0	0	4	0
Colón	Total		8	0	1	0	0	0	0	0	0	0	9	0
Agropecuario (loan)	2019–20	Primera B Nacional	0	0	0	0	—		—		0	0	0	0
General Díaz	2020	Paraguayan Primera División	3	0	0	0	—		—		0	0	3	0
Career total			11	0	1	0	0	0	0	0	0	0	12	0
