= Jorge Ortega =

Paraguayan footballer (born 1991)

Personal information
- Full name: Jorge Miguel Ortega Salinas
- Date of birth: 16 April 1991 (age 35)
- Place of birth: Caacupé, Paraguay
- Height: 1.83 m (6 ft 0 in)
- Position: Forward

Team information
- Current team: Resistencia

Youth career
- –2009: Tacuary
- 2009: → Lecce (loan)

Senior career*
Years	Team	Apps	(Gls)
2008–2012	Tacuary	57	(18)
2013–2014	Rubio Ñu	33	(17)
2014	Junior	5	(0)
2015	Sportivo Luqueño	38	(11)
2016	Coritiba	6	(1)
2016–2017	Rubio Ñu	20	(7)
2017	Huachipato	14	(4)
2018–2020	Olimpia	51	(23)
2019	→ Colón (loan)	1	(0)
2020	Sportivo Luqueño	8	(4)
2021	Macará	5	(0)
2022–	Resistencia	0	(0)

International career
2011	Paraguay U20	3	(0)
- * Club domestic league appearances and goals as of 18:10, 1 March 2022 (UTC)

Jorge Miguel Ortega Salinas is a Paraguayan footballer who plays for Resistencia as a forward.

== Club career ==
In February 2016 he signed for Brazilian Serie A club Coritiba Foot Ball Club.
