= Luis Fernando León =

Ecuadorian footballer (born 1993)

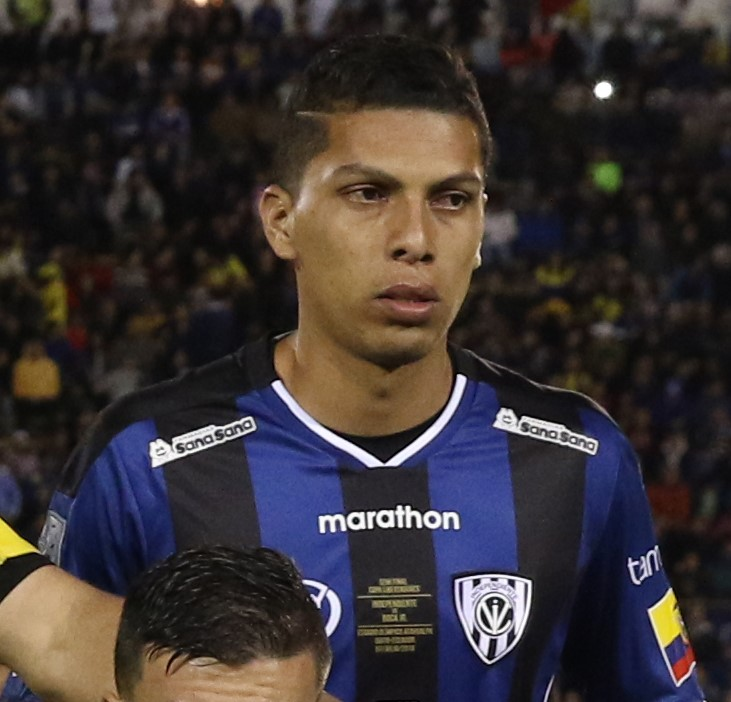

Personal information
- Full name: Luis Fernando León Bermeo
- Date of birth: 11 April 1993 (age 33)
- Place of birth: Los Ríos, Ecuador
- Height: 1.85 m (6 ft 1 in)
- Position: Defender

Team information
- Current team: C.S. Emelec
- Number: 26

Youth career
- 2008–2009: Norte América
- 2010–2012: Independiente DV

Senior career*
Years	Team	Apps	(Gls)
2012–2019	Independiente DV	215	(9)
2020–2024	Atlético San Luis	42	(1)
2021	→ Barcelona SC (loan)	27	(0)
2023–2024	→ C.S. Emelec (loan)	41	(3)
2024–	C.S. Emelec	12	(2)

International career^{‡}
2013	Ecuador U20	8	(0)
2014–	Ecuador	6	(0)
- * Club domestic league appearances and goals as of 20 August 2025 ‡ National team caps and goals as of 26 January 2022

Luis Fernando León Bermeo (born 11 April 1993) is an Ecuadorian professional footballer who plays as a defender for C.S. Emelec on loan from Liga MX club Atlético San Luis.

== Honours ==
Independiente del Valle

- Copa Sudamericana (1): 2019
