= Mauro Da Luz =

Uruguayan footballer (born 1994)

Personal information
- Full name: Mauro Andrés Da Luz Regalado
- Date of birth: September 5, 1994 (age 32)
- Place of birth: Montevideo, Uruguay
- Height: 1.74 m (5 ft 9 in)
- Position: Forward

Team information
- Current team: Atlético Grau
- Number: 77

Youth career
- 2016: River Plate
- 2016: Peñarol

Senior career*
Years	Team	Apps	(Gls)
2016–2021	River Plate	73	(10)
2019–2020	→ Colón (loan)	9	(0)
2021	→ 9 de Octubre F.C. (loan)	22	(6)
2022–2024	9 de Octubre F.C.	21	(2)
2023	→ Cusco (loan)	33	(6)
2024	→ Atlético Grau (loan)	28	(10)
2025–2026	ADT	23	(6)
2026	Aldosivi	3	(0)
2026–	Atlético Grau	10	(1)
- * Club domestic league appearances and goals as of 17:24, 3 October 2026 (UTC)

Mauro Andrés Da Luz Regalado (born September 5, 1994) is a Uruguayan professional footballer who plays for Peruvian club Atlético Grau.

== Career ==
Da Luz began his career in 2016 with River Plate Montevideo, where he is currently playing. He briefly played for the Argentinian Colón on loan from October 2019 until the summer of 2020.

== Career statistics ==
=== Club ===
As of 17 May 2025

Appearances and goals by club, season and competition
Club	Season	League		Cup		Continental		Total	
Club	Season	Apps	Goals	Apps	Goals	Apps	Goals	Apps	Goals
River Plate	2016	11	0	0	0	0	0	11	0
River Plate	2017	23	1	0	0	0	0	23	1
River Plate	2018	27	8	0	0	0	0	27	8
River Plate	2019	12	1	0	0	4	2	16	3
River Plate	2020	5	0	0	0	0	0	5	0
River Plate	Total	78	10	0	0	4	2	82	12
Colón (loan)	2019–20	11	0	2	1	0	0	13	1
9 de Octubre (loan)	2021	22	6	0	0	0	0	22	6
9 de Octubre	2022	21	2	7	0	7	3	35	5
Cusco	2023	33	6	0	0	0	0	33	6
Atlético Grau	2024	28	10	0	0	0	0	28	10
ADT	2025	8	0	0	0	1	0	9	0
Career total		201	34	9	1	12	5	222	40
