= Juan Cruz Zurbriggen =

Argentine professional footballer

Personal information
- Date of birth: 12 May 2000 (age 26)
- Place of birth: Estación Clucellas, Argentina
- Height: 1.84 m (6 ft 0 in)
- Position: Forward

Team information
- Current team: San Telmo

Youth career
- Libertad de Clucellas
- 2013: Sportivo Libertad
- 2013: → Florida de Clucellas (dual)
- 2014–2016: Atlético de Rafaela
- 2016–2018: Colón

Senior career*
Years	Team	Apps	(Gls)
2018–2025	Colón	1	(0)
2022–2023	→ San Telmo (loan)	17	(4)
2024	→ Guillermo Brown (loan)	0	(0)
2025–	San Telmo	24	(2)
- * Club domestic league appearances and goals as of 17:02, 6 May 2026 (UTC)

Juan Cruz Zurbriggen (born 12 May 2000) is an Argentine professional footballer who plays as a forward for San Telmo.

== Career ==
Zurbriggen's youth career got underway with Libertad de Clucellas, prior to joining fellow hometown team Sportivo Libertad in 2013. After also playing for Florida de Clucellas on a dual registration contract, he moved to Atlético de Rafaela's academy in 2014. In 2016, Colón signed Zurbriggen. July 2018 saw Eduardo Domínguez give the forward his first sight of first-team football as he was an unused substitute for a Copa Argentina win over Deportivo Morón. In the following April, under new manager Pablo Lavallén, Zurbriggen came off the bench in the club's inaugural match of the Copa de la Superliga versus Tigre; which finished goalless. In June 2022, Zurbriggen joined Primera Nacional side San Telmo on a loan deal until the end of 2023.

== Career statistics ==
As of 23 March 2021.

Appearances and goals by club, season and competition
Club	Season	League			Cup		League Cup		Continental		Other		Total	
Club	Season	Division	Apps	Goals	Apps	Goals	Apps	Goals	Apps	Goals	Apps	Goals	Apps	Goals
Colón	2018–19	Primera División	0	0	0	0	1	0	0	0	0	0	1	0
Colón	2019–20	Primera División	1	0	0	0	0	0	—		0	0	1	0
Colón	2020–21 (Note: Soccerway counts 2020 Copa de la Liga Profesional appearances as league appearances.)	Primera División	0	0	0	0	0	0	—		0	0	0	0
Colón	2021 (Note: Soccerway counts 2021 Copa de la Liga Profesional appearances as league appearances.)	Primera División	0	0	0	0	—		—		0	0	0	0
Career total			1	0	0	0	1	0	0	0	0	0	2	0
