= Abel Casquete =

Ecuadorian footballer (born 1997)

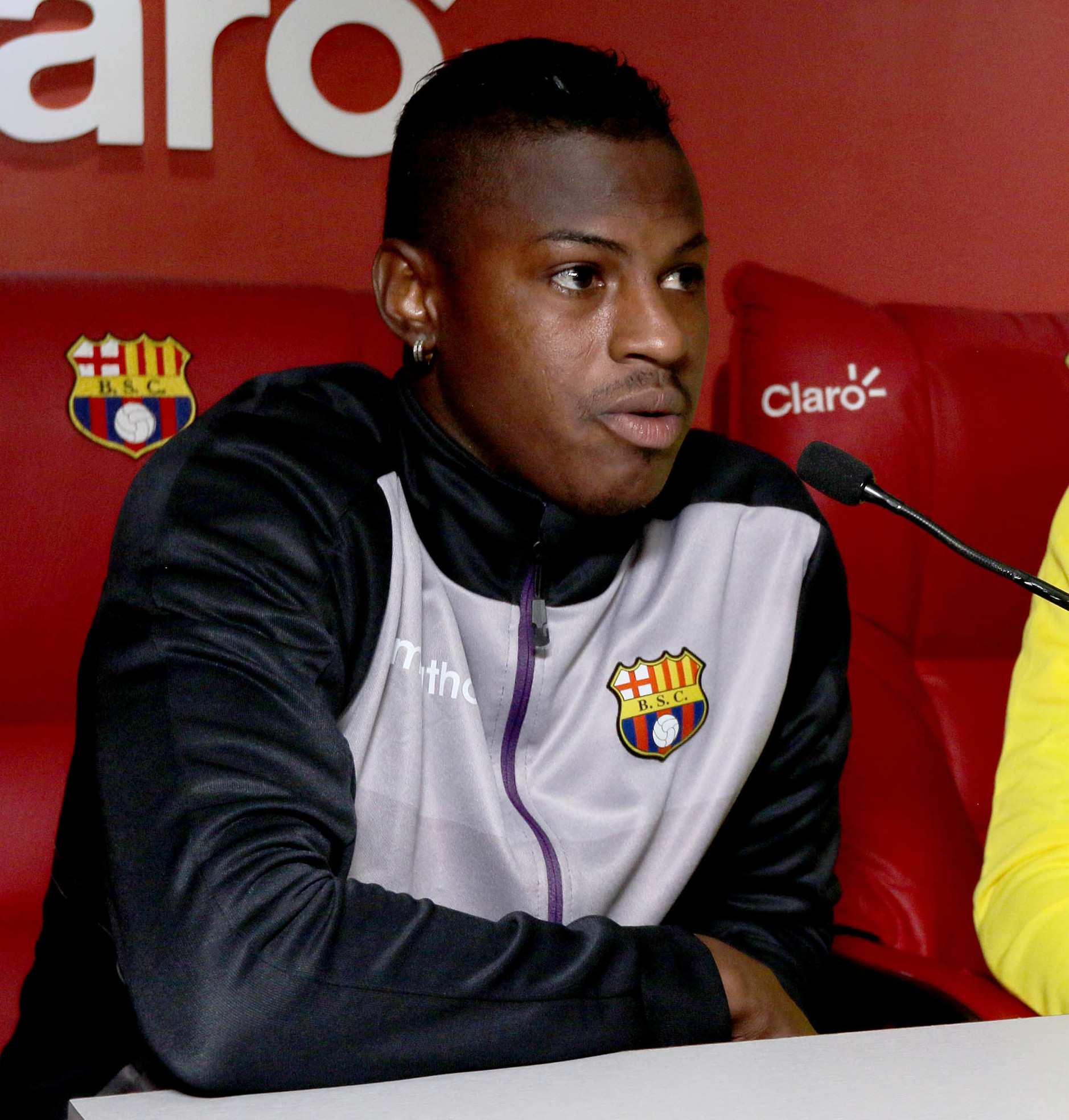

Personal information
- Full name: Abel Casquete Rodriguez
- Date of birth: 8 August 1997 (age 29)
- Place of birth: Guayaquil, Ecuador
- Height: 1.75 m (5 ft 9 in)
- Position: Winger

Team information
- Current team: FC Cajamarca
- Number: 7

Youth career
- Academia Alfaro Moreno
- –2015: River Plate

Senior career*
Years	Team	Apps	(Gls)
2015–2018	River Plate	3	(0)
2017	→ Barcelona SC (loan)	4	(1)
2017	→ Universidad Católica (loan)	5	(0)
2018	→ Deportivo Morón (loan)	0	(0)
2019	Zulia	34	(2)
2020	Orense	6	(1)
2021–	Guayaquil City	0	(0)

International career
2013	Ecuador U17	3	(0)
- * Club domestic league appearances and goals as of 22:15, 3 October 2020 (UTC)

Abel Casquete Rodriguez (born 8 August 1997) is an Ecuadorian footballer who plays as a winger for Cajamarca.

== Club career ==
Casquete is a youth exponent from River Plate. He made his league debut at 18 July 2015 against Atlético Rafaela in a 1–5 away win. He replaced Augusto Solari after 62 minutes.

== Honours ==
River Plate

- Copa Libertadores: 2015
- Suruga Bank Championship: 2015
