= Brian Farioli =

Argentine footballer

Personal information
- Date of birth: 19 February 1998 (age 28)
- Place of birth: Santa Fe, Argentina
- Height: 1.80 m (5 ft 11 in)
- Positions: Midfielder; winger

Team information
- Current team: Club Deportivo Marathón (on loan from Colón)
- Number: 44

Youth career
- Santa Fe FC
- 2009–2019: Colón

Senior career*
Years	Team	Apps	(Gls)
2019–	Colón	23	(0)
2021	→ Arsenal Sarandí (loan)	24	(2)
2023–	→ Central Córdoba SdE (loan)	34	(2)
- * Club domestic league appearances and goals as of 19:10, 15 October 2023 (UTC)

Brian Farioli (born 19 February 1998) is an Argentine professional footballer who plays as a midfielder for Central Córdoba SdE, on loan from Colón.

== Career ==
Farioli progressed through the youth ranks of Colón, having signed in 2009 from Santa Fe FC. In September 2019, the midfielder was promoted into the first-team squad of the Primera División club; notably being an unused substitute for a Copa Sudamericana semi-final first leg with Atlético Mineiro. Days later, on 22 September, Farioli made his professional debut after coming off the bench to replace Tomás Chancalay in a 3–2 league defeat to Lanús.

== Career statistics ==
As of 3 July 2020.

Appearances and goals by club, season and competition
Club	Season	League			Cup		League Cup		Continental		Other		Total	
Club	Season	Division	Apps	Goals	Apps	Goals	Apps	Goals	Apps	Goals	Apps	Goals	Apps	Goals
Colón	2019–20	Primera División	5	0	0	0	0	0	0	0	0	0	5	0
Career total			5	0	0	0	0	0	0	0	0	0	5	0
