= Lucas Acevedo =

Argentine footballer

Personal information
- Full name: Lucas Javier Acevedo
- Date of birth: 8 November 1991 (age 35)
- Place of birth: Justiciano Posse, Argentina
- Height: 1.94 m (6 ft 4 1/2 in)
- Position: Centre-back

Team information
- Current team: Deportivo Táchira

Youth career
- 2008–2009: Newell's Old Boys
- Tiro Federal

Senior career*
Years	Team	Apps	(Gls)
2012–2013	Tiro Federal	25	(1)
2013–2018	Rosario Central	9	(2)
2015	→ Nueva Chicago (loan)	5	(0)
2016	→ Estudiantes (loan)	20	(1)
2016	→ Ferro Carril Oeste (loan)	9	(1)
2017	→ Santamarina (loan)	23	(2)
2017–2018	→ San Martín (loan)	25	(2)
2018–2019	San Martín	23	(4)
2019–2023	Colón	8	(0)
2020	→ Palestino (loan)	24	(1)
2021–2022	→ Platense (loan)	11	(1)
2023–2024	Atromitos	22	(2)
2024–2025	Nea Salamina	10	(0)
2025–	Deportivo Táchira	0	(0)
- * Club domestic league appearances and goals as of 10 June 2024

Lucas Javier Acevedo (born 8 November 1991) is an Argentine professional footballer who plays as a centre-back for Deportivo Táchira.

== Career ==
Acevedo's career started with Newell's Old Boys in 2008, but he left a year later before eventually joining Tiro Federal. He featured for their senior squad during the 2012–13 Torneo Argentino A season prior to signing for Rosario Central of the Argentine Primera División. After being an unused substitute three times in 2013–14, Acevedo made his professional debut in the following campaign of 2014 during a draw with Quilmes; which was followed by his first goal against San Lorenzo two games later. He ended 2014 with two goals in twelve matches in all competitions for Rosario Central under Miguel Ángel Russo.

In January 2015, fellow Primera División side Nueva Chicago loaned Acevedo. He was subsequently selected six times. 2016 saw Acevedo have loan spells with Estudiantes and Ferro Carril Oeste in Primera B Nacional. He followed one goal in twenty-one fixtures for Estudiantes in 2016 with one in nine for Ferro Carril Oeste in 2016–17. A loan move to Santamarina was completed on 21 February 2017. Five months later, Acevedo joined San Martín on a two-year loan. They were promoted in 2017–18, with his last appearance coming versus Sarmiento on 3 June 2018; San Martín won 5–1 as Acevedo scored two.

San Martín signed Acevedo permanently ahead of the 2018–19 Argentine Primera División season. Ahead of the 2019/20 season, Acevedo joined Club Atlético Colón.

== Career statistics ==
As of 2 October 2018.

Club statistics
Club	Season	League			Cup (Note: Includes the Copa Argentina)		League Cup		Continental (Note: Includes the Copa Libertadores and Copa Sudamericana)		Other		Total	
Club	Season	Division	Apps	Goals	Apps	Goals	Apps	Goals	Apps	Goals	Apps	Goals	Apps	Goals
Tiro Federal	2012–13	Torneo Argentino A	25	1	0	0	—		—		2 (Note: Two appearances in the 2012–13 Torneo Argentino A play-offs)	0	27	1
Rosario Central	2013–14	Primera División	0	0	0	0	—		—		0	0	0	0
Rosario Central	2014	Primera División	9	2	2	0	—		1 (Note: One appearance in the 2014 Copa Sudamericana)	0	0	0	12	2
Rosario Central	2015	Primera División	0	0	0	0	—		—		0	0	0	0
Rosario Central	2016	Primera División	0	0	0	0	—		0	0	0	0	0	0
Rosario Central	2016–17	Primera División	0	0	0	0	—		—		0	0	0	0
Rosario Central	2017–18	Primera División	0	0	0	0	—		0	0	0	0	0	0
Rosario Central	Total		9	2	2	0	—		1	0	0	0	12	2
Nueva Chicago (loan)	2015	Primera División	5	0	1	0	—		—		0	0	6	0
Estudiantes (loan)	2016	Primera B Nacional	20	1	1	0	—		—		0	0	21	1
Ferro Carril Oeste (loan)	2016–17	Primera B Nacional	9	1	0	0	—		—		0	0	9	1
Santamarina (loan)	2016–17	Primera B Nacional	23	2	1	0	—		—		0	0	24	2
San Martín (loan)	2017–18	Primera B Nacional	21	1	0	0	—		—		4 (Note: Four appearances in the 2017–18 Primera B Nacional play-offs)	1 (Note: One goal in the 2017–18 Primera B Nacional play-offs)	25	2
San Martín	2018–19	Primera División	6	1	2	0	—		—		0	0	8	1
San Martín	Total		27	2	2	0	—		—		4	1	33	3
Career total			118	9	7	0	—		1	0	6	1	132	10
