= Guillermo Ortiz (Argentine footballer) =

Argentine footballer (born 1992)

Personal information
- Full name: Guillermo Luis Ortiz
- Date of birth: 9 August 1992 (age 34)
- Place of birth: Rosario, Argentina
- Height: 1.83 m (6 ft 0 in)
- Position: Centre-back

Team information
- Current team: Deportivo La Guaira
- Number: 24

Youth career
- Newell's Old Boys

Senior career*
Years	Team	Apps	(Gls)
2011–2017	Newell's Old Boys	39	(0)
2015–2016	→ Aldosivi (loan)	35	(1)
2016–2017	→ Colón (loan)	27	(1)
2017–2020	Colón	50	(2)
2020–2021	Atlético Tucumán	23	(2)
2021–2025	Godoy Cruz	39	(2)
2023	→ Newell's Old Boys (loan)	24	(1)
2024	→ Audax Italiano (loan)	24	(0)
2025	→ Colón (loan)	26	(0)
2026–	Deportivo La Guaira	2	(0)
- * Club domestic league appearances and goals as of 17:31, 14 June 2025 (UTC)

Guillermo Luis Ortiz (born 9 August 1992) is an Argentine professional footballer who plays as a centre-back for Deportivo La Guaira F.C..

== Career ==
Ortiz's first club of his career was Newell's Old Boys. After coming through the youth ranks at the club, he made his first-team debut on 29 November 2011 in a Copa Argentina match against Patronato. His league debut came on 9 March 2012 versus Colón. He went onto make thirty-nine appearances for Newell's in his next four seasons. On 16 January 2015, Ortiz joined Aldosivi of the Argentine Primera División on loan. He made his bow for Aldosivi on 17 March in the league against Belgrano, prior to scoring the first goal of his career in August versus San Martín. In total, Ortiz played thirty-five times before returning to Newell's.

In July 2016, Ortiz joined Primera División side Colón on loan. His debut for Colón was on 30 August against his former club, Aldosivi. In total, he went onto make twenty-seven league appearances for the club. He joined permanently at the end of his loan spell. Ortiz remained with Colón for three further seasons, before departing in January 2020 to Atlético Tucumán.

In 2023, he played for Newell's Old Boys on loan from Godoy Cruz. In 2024, he was again loaned out to Chilean club Audax Italiano.

== Career statistics ==
As of 1 September 2020.

Club statistics
Club	Season	League			Cup		League Cup		Continental		Other		Total	
Club	Season	Division	Apps	Goals	Apps	Goals	Apps	Goals	Apps	Goals	Apps	Goals	Apps	Goals
Newell's Old Boys	2011–12	Primera División	9	0	1	0	—		—		0	0	10	0
Newell's Old Boys	2012–13	Primera División	7	0	1	0	—		0	0	0	0	8	0
Newell's Old Boys	2013–14	Primera División	17	0	0	0	—		1 (Note: Appearance(s) in the Copa Libertadores)	0	0	0	18	0
Newell's Old Boys	2014	Primera División	6	0	1	0	—		—		0	0	7	0
Newell's Old Boys	2015	Primera División	0	0	0	0	—		—		0	0	0	0
Newell's Old Boys	2016	Primera División	0	0	0	0	—		—		0	0	0	0
Newell's Old Boys	2016–17	Primera División	0	0	0	0	—		—		0	0	0	0
Newell's Old Boys	Total		39	0	3	0	—		1	0	0	0	43	0
Aldosivi (loan)	2015	Primera División	22	1	1	0	—		—		0	0	23	1
Aldosivi (loan)	2016	Primera División	13	0	1	0	—		—		0	0	14	0
Aldosivi (loan)	Total		35	1	2	0	—		—		0	0	37	1
Colón (loan)	2016–17	Primera División	27	1	0	0	—		—		0	0	27	1
Colón	2017–18	Primera División	25	2	1	0	—		2 (Note: Appearance(s) in the Copa Sudamericana)	0	0	0	28	2
Colón	2018–19	Primera División	15	0	3	0	—		6	0	0	0	24	0
Colón	2019–20	Primera División	10	0	2	0	—		4	0	0	0	16	0
Colón	Total		77	3	6	0	—		12	0	0	0	95	3
Atlético Tucumán	2019–20	Primera División	4	0	0	0	—		2	0	0	0	6	0
Career total			155	4	11	0	—		15	0	0	0	181	4

== Honours ==
Newell's Old Boys

- Argentine Primera División: 2012–13 Torneo Final
