= Christian Bernardi (footballer) =

Argentine footballer

Personal information
- Full name: Christian Oscar Bernardi
- Date of birth: 10 March 1990 (age 36)
- Place of birth: Córdoba, Argentina
- Height: 1.77 m (5 ft 9 1/2 in)
- Position: Midfielder

Team information
- Current team: Atlanta

Youth career
- Instituto

Senior career*
Years	Team	Apps	(Gls)
2011–2016	Instituto	104	(10)
2011	→ Gimnasia y Esgrima (loan)	14	(1)
2016–2022	Colón	157	(17)
2023	Fortaleza	0	(0)
2024–2026	Colón	57	(5)
2026–	Atlanta	4	(0)
- * Club domestic league appearances and goals as of 16:36, 24 April 2026 (UTC)

Christian Oscar Bernardi (born 10 March 1990) is an Argentine professional footballer who plays as a midfielder for Atlanta.

== Career ==
=== Instituto ===
Bernardi's football senior career began in 2010 with Instituto of Primera B Nacional, he made his first-team debut on 18 August 2012 in a league match against Almirante Brown. A year previous, Bernardi had a short loan spell with Torneo Argentino A team Gimnasia y Esgrima. After returning to Instituto and making his debut, twenty-nine appearances and one goal followed for him during the 2012–13 season. On 10 May 2015, Bernardi made his 100th league appearance for the club versus Central Córdoba and scored the opening goal of the match in the process.

=== Colón ===
In July 2016, Bernardi joined Argentine Primera División side Colón. His top-flight debut came on 30 August 2016 against Aldosivi.

=== Fortaleza ===
On 26 December 2022 Fortaleza announced Bernardi's signing from Colón on a US$200k transfer fee. He signed a two-year contract with the Brazilian club until December 2024.

== Career statistics ==
As of 28 December 2022.

Club statistics
Club	Season	League			Cup (Note: Includes the Copa Argentina and Copa do Brasil)		League Cup		Continental		Other		Total	
Club	Season	Division	Apps	Goals	Apps	Goals	Apps	Goals	Apps	Goals	Apps	Goals	Apps	Goals
Instituto	2010–11	Primera B Nacional	0	0	0	0	—		—		0	0	0	0
Instituto	2011–12	Primera B Nacional	0	0	0	0	—		—		0	0	0	0
Instituto	2012–13	Primera B Nacional	30	1	2	0	—		—		0	0	32	1
Instituto	2013–14	Primera B Nacional	4	0	2	2	—		—		0	0	6	2
Instituto	2014	Primera B Nacional	16	2	1	1	—		—		0	0	17	3
Instituto	2015	Primera B Nacional	40	6	1	0	—		—		0	0	41	6
Instituto	2016	Primera B Nacional	14	1	1	0	—		—		0	0	15	1
Instituto	Total		104	10	7	3	—		—		0	0	111	13
Gimnasia y Esgrima (loan)	2010–11	Torneo Argentino A	14	1	0	0	—		—		0	0	14	1
Colón	2016–17	Primera División	25	1	1	0	—		—		0	0	26	1
Colón	2017–18	Primera División	21	3	1	0	—		2 (Note: Appearance(s) in Copa Sudamericana)	0	0	0	24	3
Colón	2018–19	Primera División	19	1	2	0	2	1	4	3	0	0	27	5
Colón	2019–20	Primera División	14	2	0	0	0	0	—		0	0	14	2
Colón	2020–21	Primera División	9	3	0	0	0	0	—		0	0	9	3
Colón	2021	Primera División	31	4	0	0	0	0	—		1 (Note: Appearance(s) in Trofeo de Campeones)	0	32	4
Colón	2022	Primera División	38	3	2	0	0	0	8 (Note: Appearances in Copa Libertadores)	1	0	0	48	3
Colón	Total		157	17	6	0	2	1	14	4	1	0	180	22
Fortaleza	2023	Série A	0	0	0	0	—		0	0	0	0	14	1
Career total			275	28	13	3	2	1	14	4	1	0	305	36
