= Wilson Morelo =

Colombian footballer (born 1987)

Personal information
- Full name: Wilson David Morelo López
- Date of birth: May 21, 1987 (age 39)
- Place of birth: Montería, Colombia
- Height: 1.72 m (5 ft 7 1/2 in)
- Position: Striker

Team information
- Current team: Águilas Doradas
- Number: 19

Senior career*
Years	Team	Apps	(Gls)
2003–2006	Bajo Cauca	10	(4)
2006–2007	Envigado	10	(1)
2007–2008	Millonarios	4	(0)
2009–2010	América de Cali	42	(8)
2011	Atlético Huila	32	(7)
2012	Deportes Tolima	12	(0)
2012–2013	La Equidad	51	(18)
2014–2016	Monterrey	13	(2)
2014–2015	→ Santa Fe (loan)	49	(22)
2016	→ Sinaloa (loan)	16	(4)
2016–2017	Pachuca	10	(3)
2017	→ Everton (loan)	9	(3)
2017–2019	Santa Fe	28	(14)
2019–2021	Colón	51	(11)
2022–2023	Santa Fe	63	(22)
2023	Águilas Doradas	25	(8)
2024	Jaguares de Córdoba	27	(6)
2025–	Águilas Doradas	31	(6)
- * Club domestic league appearances and goals as of 12 December 2025

Wilson David Morelo López (born 21 May 1987), is a Colombian football striker who plays for Categoría Primera A club Águilas Doradas.

== Career ==
Morelo started his career with Bajo Cauca in the 2003 Categoría Primera B, before joining Envigado in the Categoría Primera A for the 2006 season. He then joined Millonarios for the 2007 season.

In December 2008, Morelo joined América de Cali. He then joined Atlético Huila for the 2011 season. For the 2012 season, he joined Deportes Tolima, before joining La Equidad in the summer of the same year.

On 12 December 2013, Morelo joined Liga MX side Monterrey. In July 2014, he returned to Colombia, joining Santa Fe on loan Santa Fe beat Independiente Medellín in the final of the 2014 Categoría Primera A. He also won the 2015 Copa Sudamericana, helping Santa Fe beat Argentine club Huracán on penalties. He then joined Dorados de Sinaloa on loan for the 2016 Clausura.

On 8 June 2016, Morelo joined Pachuca on a permanent transfer. On 5 January 2017, he joined Chilean Primera División club Everton on loan.

On 29 June 2017, he returned to Colombia and Santa Fe, joining the Bogotá team.

On 25 January 2019, Morelo joined Argentine club Colón and signed a two-and-a-half-year contract. The club paid US$1 million for 75% of the player's rights. On 5 June 2021, he and fellow Colombia Yéiler Góez, were crowned champions of the 2021 Copa de la Liga.

On 22 January 2022, Morelo rejoined Santa Fe for a third spell. In July 2023, he joined Águilas Doradas looking for more playing time. On 12 January 2024, he returned to Córdoba, joining Jaguares de Córdoba. He scored the only goal in a 1–0 victory against his most recent club, Águilas Doradas.

== Career statistics ==
As of 16 December 2024

Appearances and goals by club, season and competition
Club	Season	League			Cup (Note: Includes Copa Colombia, Copa MX and Copa Argentina)		Continental (Note: Includes Copa Libertadores, Copa Sudamericana and CONCACAF Champions Cup)		Other (Note: Includes Superliga Colombiana, Campeón de Campeones and Copa de la Superliga)		Total	
Club	Season	Division	Apps	Goals	Apps	Goals	Apps	Goals	Apps	Goals	Apps	Goals
América de Cali	2009	Categoría Primera A	21	5	—		2	0	—		23	5
América de Cali	2010	Categoría Primera A	21	3	—		0	0	—		21	3
América de Cali	Total		42	8	0	0	2	0	0	0	44	8
Atlético Huila	2011	Categoría Primera A	32	7	9	1	0	0	—		41	8
Deportes Tolima	2012	Categoría Primera A	12	0	8	0	0	0	—		20	0
La Equidad	2012	Categoría Primera A	20	5	0	0	0	0	—		20	5
La Equidad	2013	Categoría Primera A	31	13	5	1	6	0	—		42	14
La Equidad	Total		51	18	5	1	6	0	0	0	62	19
Monterrey	2013–14	Liga MX	13	2	6	3	0	0	—		19	5
Santa Fe (loan)	2014	Categoría Primera A	25	10	10	4	0	0	—		35	14
Santa Fe (loan)	2015	Categoría Primera A	24	12	8	2	22	9	2	1	56	24
Santa Fe (loan)	Total		49	22	18	5	22	9	2	1	91	38
Dorados de Sinaloa (loan)	2015–16	Liga MX	16	4	3	0	0	0	—		19	4
Pachuca	2016–17	Liga MX	10	3	0	0	2	0	1	0	13	3
Everton (loan)	2016–17	Campeonato Chileno	9	3	0	0	1	0	—		10	3
Santa Fe	2017	Categoría Primera A	15	8	1	1	—		—		16	9
Santa Fe	2018	Categoría Primera A	29	13	3	1	17	11	—		49	25
Santa Fe	Total		44	21	4	2	17	11	0	0	65	34
Colón	2018–19	Primera División	6	1	1	1	—		1	0	8	2
Colón	2019–20	Primera División	20	6	2	0	6	3	1	1	29	10
Colón	2020–21	Primera División	8	2	0	0	—		—		8	2
Colón	2021	Primera División	17	2	0	0	—		—		17	2
Colón	Total		51	11	3	1	6	3	2	1	62	16
Santa Fe	2022	Categoría Primera A	44	19	0	0	—		—		44	19
Santa Fe	2023	Categoría Primera A	19	3	2	0	5	0	—		26	3
Santa Fe	Total		63	22	2	0	5	0	0	0	70	22
Águilas Doradas	2023	Categoría Primera A	25	4	3	0	—		—		28	4
Jaguares de Córdoba	2024	Categoría Primera A	27	8	1	0	—		—		28	8
Career total			439	133	62	14	61	23	5	2	567	172

== Honours ==
=== Club ===
Santa Fe

- Categoría Primera A: 2014–II
- Superliga Colombiana: 2015
- Copa Sudamericana: 2015

=== Individual ===
- Copa Sudamericana top scorer: 2015
