= Emanuel Olivera =

Argentinian footballer (born 1990)

Personal information
- Full name: Emanuel Olivera
- Date of birth: 2 April 1990 (age 36)
- Place of birth: Buenos Aires, Argentina
- Height: 1.80 m (5 ft 11 in)
- Position: Centre back

Team information
- Current team: Santa Fe
- Number: 18

Youth career
- Vélez Sársfield

Senior career*
Years	Team	Apps	(Gls)
2009–2013	Vélez Sársfield	7	(0)
2013–2014	Almirante Brown	22	(1)
2014–2016	Boca Unidos	50	(2)
2016–2021	Colón	60	(1)
2021–2022	Atlético Nacional	76	(3)
2023	Banfield	16	(0)
2023–2024	Atlético Junior	65	(2)
2025–	Santa Fe	43	(1)
- * Club domestic league appearances and goals as of 11 December 2025

Emanuel Olivera (born 2 April 1990) is an Argentine professional footballer who plays as a defender for Categoría Primera A side Santa Fe.
