= 2017–18 San Martín de San Juan season =

San Martín de San Juan
2017–18 season
- Chairman: Pablo Slavutzky
- Manager: Néstor Gorosito
- Stadium: Estadio Ingeniero Hilario Sánchez
- Primera División: 8th
- Copa Argentina: Round of 64
- Top goalscorer: League: Two players (3); All: Two players (3)

The 2017–18 season is San Martín de San Juan's fourth consecutive season in the top-flight of Argentine football. The season covers the period from 1 July 2017 to 30 June 2018.

== Current squad ==
As of 20 August 2017.

Note: Flags indicate national team as defined under FIFA eligibility rules; some limited exceptions apply. Players may hold more than one non-FIFA nationality.

No.	Pos.	Nation	Player
1	GK	ARG	Luis Ardente
2	DF	ARG	Francisco Mattia
3	MF	ARG	Sergio Sagarzazu
5	MF	ARG	Marcos Gelabert
6	DF	ARG	Matías Escudero
7	FW	ARG	Nicolás Maná (on loan from Cañuelas)
8	MF	ARG	Matías Fissore
10	MF	ARG	Lucas Salas
11	MF	ARG	Leandro Martínez
12	GK	ARG	Leonardo Corti
14	MF	ARG	Emiliano Agüero
18	MF	ARG	Sebastián Rusculleda
20	MF	ARG	Santiago Chacón
21	GK	ARG	Federico Urraburo

No.	Pos.	Nation	Player
25	DF	ARG	Pablo Aguilar
26	DF	ARG	Arián Pucheta
27	FW	ARG	Gustavo Villarruel
28	DF	COL	Mauricio Casierra
33	FW	URU	Facundo Barcelo (on loan from Juventud)
34	DF	ARG	Maximiliano Algañaraz
35	MF	ARG	Nicolás Pelaitay
—	MF	URU	Álvaro Fernández
—	MF	ARG	Carlos Luque (on loan from Internacional)
—	MF	ARG	Gabriel Carabajal
—	DF	ARG	Gonzalo Prósperi
—	DF	ARG	Leandro Vega (on loan from River Plate)
—	FW	ARG	Nicolás Messiniti (on loan from Independiente)

== Transfers ==
=== In ===
Date	Pos.	Name	From	Fee
1 July 2017	MF	(Argentina) Emiliano Agüero	(Argentina) River Plate	Undisclosed
17 July 2017	DF	(Argentina) Gonzalo Prósperi	(Argentina) San Lorenzo	Undisclosed
23 July 2017	MF	(Argentina) Gabriel Carabajal	(Argentina) Godoy Cruz	Undisclosed
28 July 2017	MF	(Uruguay) Álvaro Fernández	(United States) Seattle Sounders FC	Undisclosed

=== Out ===
Date	Pos.	Name	To	Fee
1 July 2017	FW	(Uruguay) Diego Cháves	(Chile) San Luis de Quillota	Undisclosed
1 July 2017	FW	(Argentina) Emanuel Dening	(Turkey) Yeni Malatyaspor	Undisclosed
10 July 2017	MF	(Argentina) Javier Capelli	(Argentina) Sarmiento	Undisclosed
24 July 2017	DF	(Argentina) Franco Lazzaroni	(Argentina) Atlético de Rafaela	Undisclosed

=== Loan in ===
Date from	Date to	Pos.	Name	From
17 July 2017	30 June 2018	DF	(Argentina) Leandro Vega	(Argentina) River Plate
19 July 2017	30 June 2018	MF	(Argentina) Carlos Luque	(Brazil) Internacional
22 July 2017	30 June 2018	FW	(Argentina) Nicolás Messiniti	(Argentina) Independiente

== Friendlies ==
=== Pre-season ===
Win Draw Loss

4 August 2017 Friendly	Vélez Sarsfield (Argentina)	2–1	(Argentina) San Martín	Ituzaingó, Argentina
09:30	G. Bergessio 7'; N. Domínguez 22'	Report	F. Barcelo 3'	Stadium: Villa Olímpica Raúl Héctor Gámez

7 August 2017 Friendly	Gimnasia y Esgrima (Argentina)	2–2	(Argentina) San Martín	Buenos Aires, Argentina
09:00	M. Noble 4'; N. Ibáñez 56'	Report	F. Barceló 30'; C. Luque 44'	Stadium: Unión Tranviarios Automotor de Moreno

7 August 2017 Friendly	Gimnasia y Esgrima (Argentina)	1–1	(Argentina) San Martín	Buenos Aires, Argentina
10:45	B. Alemán 18'	Report	G. Carabajal 4'	Stadium: Unión Tranviarios Automotor de Moreno

== Primera División ==
=== League table ===
Pos	Team	Pld	W	D	L	GF	GA	GD	Pts	Qualification
16	Estudiantes (LP)	27	10	6	11	25	26	−1	36	
17	Banfield	27	9	8	10	27	24	+3	35	
18	San Martín (SJ)	27	9	6	12	30	36	−6	33	
19	Patronato	27	8	9	10	26	32	−6	33	
20	Rosario Central	27	8	8	11	30	41	−11	32	Qualification for Copa Libertadores group stage (Note: Rosario Central qualified for the Copa Libertadores group stage by winning the 2017–18 Copa Argentina.)

Source: AFA
Rules for classification: 1) points; 2) play-off (only if needed to decide championship); 3) goal difference; 4) goals scored; 5) head-to-head points; 6) head-to-head goal difference; 7) head-to-head goals scored.

=== Results by matchday ===
Matchday	1	2	3	4	5	6	7	8	9	10	11	12	13	14	15	16	17	18	19	20	21	22	23	24	25	26	27
Ground	H	A	H	A	H	A	H	A	H	A	H	H	A														
Result	W	L	L	D	W	W	W	D	L	L	W	W															
Position	5	10	19	17	13	12	8	8	9	13	9	8															

Updated to match(es) played on 12 December 2017. Source: Soccerway
A = Away; H = Home; W = Win; D = Draw; L = Loss

27 August 2017 1	San Martín (Argentina)	2–0	(Argentina) Patronato	San Juan, Argentina
11:05	F. Barcelo 3'; M. Gelabert 75'	Report		Stadium: Estadio Ingeniero Hilario Sánchez; Referee: Diego Abal (Argentina)

9 September 2017 2	Belgrano (Argentina)	1–0	(Argentina) San Martín	Córdoba, Argentina
14:05	E. García 66'	Report		Stadium: El Gigante de Alberdi; Referee: Andrés Merlos (Argentina)

17 September 2017 3	San Martín (Argentina)	1–3	(Argentina) River Plate	San Juan, Argentina
20:05	C. Auzqui 39' (o.g.)	Report	R. Borré 4'; C. Auzqui 25'; A. Marcel 90+3'	Stadium: Estadio Ingeniero Hilario Sánchez; Referee: Fernando Echenique (Argentina)

24 September 2017 4	Racing Club (Argentina)	0–0	(Argentina) San Martín	Avellaneda, Argentina
20:05		Report		Stadium: Estadio Presidente Juan Domingo Perón; Referee: Néstor Pitana (Argentina)

1 October 2017 5	San Martín (Argentina)	3–1	(Argentina) Rosario Central	San Juan, Argentina
14:05	E. Agüero 62'; F. Barcelo 64'; L. Ardente 88' (pen.)	Report	F. Zampedri 45'	Stadium: Estadio Ingeniero Hilario Sánchez; Referee: Juan Pompei (Argentina)

16 October 2017 6	Arsenal de Sarandí (Argentina)	0–1	(Argentina) San Martín	Avellaneda, Argentina
21:05		Report	G. Carabajal 55'	Stadium: Estadio Julio Humberto Grondona; Referee: Diego Abal (Argentina)

28 October 2017 7	San Martín (Argentina)	1–0	(Argentina) Estudiantes	San Juan, Argentina
16:10	L. Ardente 17' (pen.)	Report		Stadium: Estadio Ingeniero Hilario Sánchez; Referee: Nicolás Lamolina (Argentina)

4 November 2017 8	Colón (Argentina)	3–3	(Argentina) San Martín	Santa Fe, Argentina
14:05	M. Fritzler 43'; T. Chancalay 46'; D. Vera 51'	Report	C. Mosca 10'; M. Escudero 63'; L. Ardente 90' (pen.)	Stadium: Estadio Brigadier General Estanislao López; Referee: Juan Pompei (Argentina)

18 November 2017 9	San Martín (Argentina)	1–3	(Argentina) San Lorenzo	San Juan, Argentina
19:15	A. Fernández 73'	Report	N. Blandi 39', 90+3'; P. Díaz 55'	Stadium: Estadio Ingeniero Hilario Sánchez; Referee: Fernando Rapallini (Argentina)

27 November 2017 10	Temperley (Argentina)	1–0	(Argentina) San Martín	Turdera, Argentina
21:30	A. Arregui 4'	Report		Stadium: Estadio Alfredo Beranger; Referee: Diego Abal (Argentina)

4 December 2017 11	San Martín (Argentina)	2–1	(Argentina) Banfield	San Juan, Argentina
21:30	M. Rodríguez 3'; G. Carabajal 18'	Report	G. Bettini 50'	Stadium: Estadio Ingeniero Hilario Sánchez; Referee: Silvio Trucco (Argentina)

11 December 2017 12	San Martín (Argentina)	1–0	(Argentina) Defensa y Justicia	San Juan, Argentina
19:15	F. Barcelo 38'	Report		Stadium: Estadio Ingeniero Hilario Sánchez; Referee: Facundo Tello (Argentina)

January 2018 13	Argentinos Juniors (Argentina)	–	(Argentina) San Martín	Buenos Aires, Argentina
		Report		Stadium: Estadio Diego Armando Maradona

== Copa Argentina ==
Win Draw Loss

–
