= 2017–18 Club Atlético Colón season =

Colón
2017–18 season
- Chairman: José Nestor Viganatti
- Manager: Eduardo Domínguez
- Stadium: Estadio Brigadier General Estanislao López
- Primera División: 7th
- 2016–17 Copa Argentina: Round of 32
- 2017–18 Copa Argentina: Round of 64
- Copa Sudamericana: First stage
- Top goalscorer: League: Diego Vera (3); All: Diego Vera (3)

The 2017–18 season is Colón's 4th consecutive season in the top-flight of Argentine football. The season covers the period from 1 July 2017 to 30 June 2018.

== Current squad ==
As of 30 August 2017.

Note: Flags indicate national team as defined under FIFA eligibility rules; some limited exceptions apply. Players may hold more than one non-FIFA nationality.

No.	Pos.	Nation	Player
2	DF	ARG	Osvaldo Barsottini
3	DF	ARG	Clemente Rodríguez
4	DF	ARG	Lucas Ceballos
6	DF	ARG	Emanuel Olivera
9	FW	ARG	Nicolás Leguizamón
12	FW	URU	Diego Vera
14	MF	ARG	Adrián Bastía
15	FW	ARG	Nicolás Silva
23	MF	ARG	Christian Bernardi
27	MF	ARG	Pablo Ledesma
28	GK	ARG	Joaquín Aylagas
30	DF	ARG	Germán Conti
32	DF	ARG	Tomás Sandoval

No.	Pos.	Nation	Player
33	DF	ARG	Facundo Garcés
34	DF	ARG	Osvaldo Arroyo
—	MF	ARG	Cristian Guanca
—	MF	ARG	Diego Morales
—	FW	ARG	Facundo Callejo
—	GK	ARG	Gonzalo Marinelli
—	DF	ARG	Gustavo Toledo (on loan from Independiente)
—	GK	ARG	Ignacio Chicco
—	MF	ARG	Jonathan Galván
—	MF	ARG	Leonardo Heredia (on loan from Almirante Brown)
—	MF	PAR	Marcelo Estigarribia (on loan from Deportivo Maldonado)
—	MF	ARG	Matías Fritzler
—	FW	ARG	Mauro Marconato

=== Out on loan ===
Note: Flags indicate national team as defined under FIFA eligibility rules; some limited exceptions apply. Players may hold more than one non-FIFA nationality.

No.	Pos.	Nation	Player
21	MF	ARG	Juan Bauza (at Juventud Unida until 30 June 2018)
—	FW	ARG	Gustavo Villarruel (at San Martín until 30 June 2018)

== Transfers ==
=== In ===
Date	Pos.	Name	From	Fee
7 July 2017	GK	(Argentina) Gonzalo Marinelli	(Argentina) Huracán	Undisclosed
7 July 2017	MF	(Argentina) Matías Fritzler	(Argentina) Huracán	Undisclosed
25 July 2017	MF	(Argentina) Jonathan Galván	(Argentina) Aldosivi	Undisclosed
30 July 2017	MF	(Argentina) Diego Morales	(Argentina) Tigre	Undisclosed

=== Out ===
Date	Pos.	Name	To	Fee
1 July 2017	MF	(Argentina) Diego Lagos	Released	
1 July 2017	MF	(Paraguay) Fidencio Oviedo	(Paraguay) Guaraní	Undisclosed
1 July 2017	GK	(Argentina) Jorge Broun	(Bulgaria) Ludogorets Razgrad	Undisclosed
1 July 2017	DF	(Argentina) Raúl Iberbia	Released	
4 July 2017	MF	(Argentina) Gerónimo Poblete	(France) Metz	Undisclosed
6 July 2017	MF	(Argentina) Franco Mazurek	(Greece) Panetolikos	Undisclosed
21 July 2017	MF	(Argentina) Yamil Garnier	(Argentina) Sarmiento (J)	Undisclosed
25 July 2017	DF	(Argentina) Pablo Cuevas	(Argentina) Sarmiento (R)	Undisclosed
9 August 2017	MF	(Argentina) Franco Leys	(Argentina) Juventud Unida	Undisclosed
11 August 2017	FW	(Argentina) Ismael Blanco	(Argentina) Atlético Tucumán	Undisclosed
17 August 2017	GK	(Argentina) Jorge Carranza	(Argentina) Atlético de Rafaela	Undisclosed

=== Loan in ===
Date from	Date to	Pos.	Name	From
15 July 2017	30 June 2018	MF	(Paraguay) Marcelo Estigarribia	(Uruguay) Deportivo Maldonado
19 July 2017	30 June 2018	DF	(Argentina) Gustavo Toledo	(Argentina) Independiente
21 August 2017	30 June 2018	MF	(Argentina) Leonardo Heredia	(Argentina) Almirante Brown

=== Loan out ===
Date from	Date to	Pos.	Name	To
1 July 2017	30 June 2018	FW	(Argentina) Gustavo Villarruel	(Argentina) San Martín
14 August 2017	30 June 2018	MF	(Argentina) Juan Bauza	(Argentina) Juventud Unida

== Friendlies ==
=== Pre-season ===
Win Draw Loss

26 July 2017 Friendly	Colón (Argentina)	1–0	(Argentina) Arsenal de Viale	Santa Fe, Argentina
	F. Garcés	Report		Stadium: Estadio Brigadier General Estanislao López

26 July 2017 Friendly	Colón (Argentina)	3–0	(Argentina) Arsenal de Viale	Santa Fe, Argentina
10:00	M. Estigarribia; T. Sandoval; J. Bauza	Report		Stadium: Estadio Brigadier General Estanislao López

29 July 2017 Friendly	Colón (Argentina)	4–1	(Argentina) Sportivo Belgrano	Santa Fe, Argentina
	T. Sandoval; C. Guanca; G. Toledo	Report	G. Triverio	Stadium: Estadio Brigadier General Estanislao López

1 August 2017 Friendly	Vélez Sarsfield (Argentina)	2–0	(Argentina) Colón	Buenos Aires, Argentina
09:00	N. Delgadillo; G. Bergessio	Report		Stadium: Villa Olímpica de Ituzaingó

1 August 2017 Friendly	Vélez Sarsfield (Argentina)	3–0	(Argentina) Colón	Buenos Aires, Argentina
	M. Romero; J. Correa; F. Grillo	Report		Stadium: Villa Olímpica de Ituzaingó

5 August 2017 Friendly	Boca Juniors (Argentina)	2–2	(Argentina) Colón	Buenos Aires, Argentina
	D. Benedetto; E. Cardona	Report	C. Guanca; G. Conti	Stadium: La Bombonera

5 August 2017 Friendly	Boca Juniors (Argentina)	0–0	(Argentina) Colón	Buenos Aires, Argentina
		Report		Stadium: La Bombonera

10 August 2017 Friendly	Colón (Argentina)	3–1	(Argentina) Olimpo	Santa Fe, Argentina
10:00	C. Guanca; N. Leguizamón	Report	Goal

16 August 2017 Friendly	Belgrano (Argentina)	5–1	(Argentina) Colón	Córdoba, Argentina
	J. Ramis; S. Martínez; M. Benítez; M. Barbieri; M. Suárez	Report	Goal	Stadium: El Gigante de Alberdi

16 August 2017 Friendly	Belgrano (Argentina)	2–2	(Argentina) Colón	Córdoba, Argentina
	B. Volpini; F. Brener	Report	Goal	Stadium: El Gigante de Alberdi

== Primera División ==
=== League table ===
Pos	Team	Pld	W	D	L	GF	GA	GD	Pts	Qualification
9	Defensa y Justicia	27	13	5	9	41	34	+7	44	Qualification for Copa Sudamericana first stage
10	Unión	27	11	10	6	33	23	+10	43	Qualification for Copa Sudamericana first stage
11	Colón	27	11	8	8	32	22	+10	41	Qualification for Copa Sudamericana first stage
12	Argentinos Juniors	27	12	5	10	36	30	+6	41	Qualification for Copa Sudamericana first stage
13	Belgrano	27	10	10	7	29	28	+1	40	

Source: AFA
Rules for classification: 1) points; 2) play-off (only if needed to decide championship); 3) goal difference; 4) goals scored; 5) head-to-head points; 6) head-to-head goal difference; 7) head-to-head goals scored.

=== Results by matchday ===
Matchday	1	2	3	4	5	6	7	8	9	10	11	12	13	14	15	16	17	18	19	20	21	22	23	24	25	26	27
Ground	H	A	H	H	A	H	A	H	A	H	A	H	A														
Result	D	W	D	W	D	W	D	D	W	W	L	L															
Position	12	7	9	5	6	4	6	6	5	5	5	7															

Updated to match(es) played on 12 December 2017. Source: Soccerway
A = Away; H = Home; W = Win; D = Draw; L = Loss

26 August 2017 1	Colón (Argentina)	1–1	(Argentina) Rosario Central	Santa Fe, Argentina
16:15	T. Sandoval 87'	Report	W. Camacho 84'	Stadium: Estadio Brigadier General Estanislao López; Referee: Juan Pompei (Argentina)

8 September 2017 2	Arsenal de Sarandí (Argentina)	0–1	(Argentina) Colón	Avellaneda, Argentina
19:05		Report	T. Chancalay 68'	Stadium: Estadio Julio Humberto Grondona; Referee: Ariel Penel (Argentina)

15 September 2017 3	Colón (Argentina)	0–0	(Argentina) Estudiantes	Santa Fe, Argentina
21:05		Report		Stadium: Estadio Brigadier General Estanislao López; Referee: Pedro Argañaraz (Argentina)

24 September 2017 4	Colón (Argentina)	3–1	(Argentina) Defensa y Justicia	Santa Fe, Argentina
11:05	G. Conti 9'; C. Bernardi 64'; C. Guanca 90+4'	Report	G. Castellani 81'	Stadium: Estadio Brigadier General Estanislao López; Referee: Juan Pompei (Argentina)

30 September 2017 5	San Lorenzo (Argentina)	0–0	(Argentina) Colón	Buenos Aires, Argentina
14:05		Report		Stadium: Estadio Pedro Bidegain; Referee: Fernando Espinoza (Argentina)

14 October 2017 6	Colón (Argentina)	2–0	(Argentina) Temperley	Santa Fe, Argentina
14:05	N. Leguizamón 29'; M. Estigarribia 90+3'	Report		Stadium: Estadio Brigadier General Estanislao López; Referee: Hernán Mastrángelo (Argentina)

27 October 2017 7	Banfield (Argentina)	1–1	(Argentina) Colón	Banfield, Argentina
19:05	M. Sperduti 63' (pen.)	Report	D. Vera 34'	Stadium: Estadio Florencio Sola; Referee: Darío Herrera (Argentina)

4 November 2017 8	Colón (Argentina)	3–3	(Argentina) San Martín	Santa Fe, Argentina
14:05	M. Fritzler 43'; T. Chancalay 46'; D. Vera 51'	Report	C. Mosca 10'; M. Escudero 63'; L. Ardente 90' (pen.)	Stadium: Estadio Brigadier General Estanislao López; Referee: Juan Pompei (Argentina)

17 November 2017 9	Argentinos Juniors (Argentina)	0–1	(Argentina) Colón	Buenos Aires, Argentina
17:00		Report	G. Ortiz 63'	Stadium: Estadio Diego Armando Maradona; Referee: Nicolás Lamolina (Argentina)

24 November 2017 10	Colón (Argentina)	3–1	(Argentina) Tigre	Santa Fe, Argentina
21:30	P. Ledesma 52'; D. Vera 65' (pen.); C. Bernardi 70'	Report	M. Caire 36'	Stadium: Estadio Brigadier General Estanislao López; Referee: Ariel Penel (Argentina)

4 December 2017 11	Atlético Tucumán (Argentina)	2–0	(Argentina) Colón	San Miguel de Tucumán, Argentina
19:15	L. Rodríguez 24'; G. Acosta 90+2'	Report		Stadium: Estadio Monumental José Fierro; Referee: Andrés Merlos (Argentina)

10 December 2017 12	Colón (Argentina)	0–2	(Argentina) Talleres	Santa Fe, Argentina
19:15		Report	J. Arias 17'; S. Palacios 74'	Stadium: Estadio Brigadier General Estanislao López; Referee: Jorge Baliño (Argentina)

January 2018 13	Boca Juniors (Argentina)	–	(Argentina) Colón	Buenos Aires, Argentina
		Report		Stadium: La Bombonera

== Copa Argentina ==
Win Draw Loss

1 September 2017 R32	Huracán (Argentina)	1–0	(Argentina) Colón	Buenos Aires, Argentina
21:10	R. Ábila 76' (pen.)	Report		Stadium: Estadio Diego Armando Maradona; Referee: Andrés Merlos (Argentina)

== Copa Sudamericana ==
Win Draw Loss

–
