= 2017–18 Club Atlético Belgrano season =

Belgrano
2017–18 season
- Chairman: Armando Pérez
- Manager: Sebastián Méndez (until 16 October 2017); Pablo Lavallén (from 23 October 2017)
- Stadium: El Gigante de Alberdi; Estadio Mario Alberto Kempes
- Primera División: 9th
- 2016–17 Copa Argentina: Round of 16
- 2017–18 Copa Argentina: Round of 64
- Top goalscorer: League: Two players (2); All: Two players (2)

The 2017–18 season is Club Atlético Belgrano's 8th consecutive season in the top-flight of Argentine football. The season covers the period from 1 July 2017 to 30 June 2018.

== Current squad ==
As of 25 August 2017.

Note: Flags indicate national team as defined under FIFA eligibility rules; some limited exceptions apply. Players may hold more than one non-FIFA nationality.

No.	Pos.	Nation	Player
3	DF	ARG	Federico Álvarez
6	DF	ARG	Cristian Lema
8	MF	ARG	Francisco Romero
10	FW	ARG	Matías Suárez
12	DF	ARG	Imanol González
13	DF	ARG	Franco Pardo
14	MF	ARG	Federico Lértora
15	GK	ARG	Lucas Acosta
17	DF	ARG	Cristian Romero
18	MF	ARG	Gastón Álvarez Suárez
20	MF	ARG	Gabriel Alanís
21	MF	ARG	Sebastián Luna
23	FW	ARG	Mariano Barbieri
24	MF	ARG	Germán Gaitán
25	GK	ARG	Germán Montoya
27	MF	ARG	Joaquín Rikemberg
28	FW	ARG	Tomás Attis
29	DF	ARG	Juan Quiroga
31	MF	ARG	Braian Volpini

No.	Pos.	Nation	Player
33	DF	ARG	Tomás Guidara
—	FW	PAR	Epifanio García (on loan from Guaraní)
—	DF	ARG	Erik Godoy (on loan from Tigre)
—	MF	URU	Jonathan Ramis (on loan from Zacatepec)
—	MF	ARG	Jorge Ortiz (on loan from Independiente)
—	MF	ARG	Juan Brunetta
—	DF	ARG	Lautaro Caride
—	FW	ARG	Leandro Fernández
—	FW	ARG	Leonardo Sequeira (on loan from Central Córdoba)
—	DF	ARG	Marcelo Benítez
—	MF	ARG	Marcos Rivadero
—	MF	ARG	Maximiliano Zárate
—	FW	ARG	Neri Bandiera
—	GK	ARG	Pablo Heredia
—	DF	ARG	Pier Barrios
—	FW	ARG	Santiago Giordana
—	MF	URU	Santiago Martínez (on loan from Montevideo Wanderers)
—	FW	ARG	Tobías Figueroa

=== Out on loan ===
Note: Flags indicate national team as defined under FIFA eligibility rules; some limited exceptions apply. Players may hold more than one non-FIFA nationality.

No.	Pos.	Nation	Player
9	FW	ARG	Fernando Márquez (at Defensa y Justicia until 30 June 2018)
—	GK	ARG	César Rigamonti (at Vélez Sarsfield until 30 June 2018)
—	FW	ARG	Augusto Cáseres (at Senglea Athletic until 30 June 2018)
—	DF	ARG	Esteban Espíndola (at San Martín (T) until 30 June 2018)

No.	Pos.	Nation	Player
—	FW	ARG	Iván Paz (at Senglea Athletic until 30 June 2018)
—	FW	ARG	Nahuel Luján (at Ferro Carril Oeste until 30 June 2018)
—	DF	ARG	Nicolás Ferreyra (at Audax Italiano until 31 December 2017)
—	DF	ARG	Renzo Saravia (at Racing Club until 30 June 2018)

== Transfers ==
=== In ===
Date	Pos.	Name	From	Fee
1 July 2017	DF	(Argentina) Lautaro Caride	(Argentina) Independiente	Undisclosed
4 July 2017	FW	(Argentina) Neri Bandiera	(Argentina) Aldosivi	Undisclosed
22 August 2017	MF	(Argentina) Juan Brunetta	(Argentina) Arsenal de Sarandí	Undisclosed

=== Out ===
Date	Pos.	Name	To	Fee
1 July 2017	DF	(Argentina) Cristian Gorgerino	Released (Note: Following his release, Gorgerino signed for Instituto.)	
1 July 2017	MF	(Argentina) Mario Bolatti	Released (Note: Following his release, Bolatti signed for Boca Unidos.)	
1 July 2017	MF	(Argentina) Sebastián Prediger	Released (Note: Following his release, Prediger signed for San Martín (T).)	
19 July 2017	MF	(Argentina) Guillermo Farré	(Argentina) Sarmiento	Undisclosed
23 July 2017	MF	(Argentina) Iván Etevenaux	(Argentina) Sarmiento	Undisclosed
26 July 2017	MF	(Argentina) Jorge Velázquez	(Argentina) Atlético de Rafaela	Undisclosed
28 July 2017	DF	(Argentina) Lucas Aveldaño	(Spain) Tenerife	Undisclosed
6 August 2017	FW	(Argentina) Claudio Bieler	(Argentina) San Martín (T)	Undisclosed

=== Loan in ===
Date from	Date to	Pos.	Name	From
7 July 2017	30 June 2018	DF	(Argentina) Marcelo Benítez	(Argentina) Defensa y Justicia
10 July 2017	30 June 2018	MF	(Uruguay) Santiago Martínez	(Uruguay) Montevideo Wanderers
13 July 2017	30 June 2018	MF	(Uruguay) Jonathan Ramis	(Mexico) Zacatepec
17 July 2017	30 June 2018	MF	(Argentina) Jorge Ortiz	(Argentina) Independiente
21 July 2017	30 June 2018	FW	(Paraguay) Epifanio García	(Paraguay) Guaraní
16 August 2017	30 June 2018	FW	(Argentina) Leonardo Sequeira	(Argentina) Central Córdoba
25 August 2017	30 June 2018	DF	(Argentina) Erik Godoy	(Argentina) Tigre

=== Loan out ===
Date from	Date to	Pos.	Name	To
7 July 2017	30 June 2018	DF	(Argentina) Renzo Saravia	(Argentina) Racing Club
30 July 2017	30 June 2018	FW	(Argentina) Fernando Márquez	(Argentina) Defensa y Justicia
2 August 2017	30 June 2018	GK	(Argentina) César Rigamonti	(Argentina) Vélez Sarsfield
15 August 2017	30 June 2018	FW	(Argentina) Augusto Cáseres	(Malta) Senglea Athletic
15 August 2017	30 June 2018	FW	(Argentina) Iván Paz	(Malta) Senglea Athletic
17 August 2017	30 June 2018	DF	(Argentina) Esteban Espíndola	(Argentina) San Martín (T)

== Friendlies ==
=== Pre-season ===
Win Draw Loss

26 July 2017 Friendly	Belgrano (Argentina)	Cancelled	(Argentina) Racing Club	Córdoba, Argentina
11:00		Report

26 July 2017 Friendly	Belgrano (Argentina)	2–0	(Argentina) Racing de Córdoba	Córdoba, Argentina
09:00	C. Romero; J. Ramis	Report		Stadium: Villa Esquiú Academy

26 July 2017 Friendly	Belgrano (Argentina)	1–0	(Argentina) Racing de Córdoba	Córdoba, Argentina
	B. Volpini	Report		Stadium: Villa Esquiú Academy

29 July 2017 Friendly	Belgrano (Argentina)	2–1	(Argentina) Sportivo Desamparados	Córdoba, Argentina
10:00	N. Bandiera; M. Suárez	Report		Stadium: Villa Esquiú Academy

29 July 2017 Friendly	Belgrano (Argentina)	1–0	(Argentina) Sportivo Desamparados	Córdoba, Argentina
10:00	V. Barbero	Report		Stadium: Villa Esquiú Academy

2 August 2017 Friendly	Belgrano (Argentina)	2–1	(Argentina) Temperley	Córdoba, Argentina
09:00	(o.g.); M. Suárez	Report	F. Sosa 4'	Stadium: Villa Esquiú Academy

2 August 2017 Friendly	Belgrano (Argentina)	3–0	(Argentina) Temperley	Córdoba, Argentina
10:30	T. Attis; E. Espíndola; F. Brener	Report		Stadium: Villa Esquiú Academy

5 August 2017 Friendly	Newell's Old Boys (Argentina)	3–1	(Argentina) Belgrano	Rosario, Argentina
	J. San Román 28'; V. Figueroa 59'; B. Rivero 70'	Report	T. Figueroa 58'	Stadium: Polideportivo de Bella Vista

16 August 2017 Friendly	Belgrano (Argentina)	5–1	(Argentina) Colón	Córdoba, Argentina
	J. Ramis; S. Martínez; M. Benítez; M. Barbieri; M. Suárez	Report	Goal	Stadium: El Gigante de Alberdi

16 August 2017 Friendly	Belgrano (Argentina)	2–2	(Argentina) Colón	Córdoba, Argentina
	B. Volpini; F. Brener	Report	Goal	Stadium: El Gigante de Alberdi

== Primera División ==
=== League table ===
Pos	Team	Pld	W	D	L	GF	GA	GD	Pts	Qualification
11	Colón	27	11	8	8	32	22	+10	41	Qualification for Copa Sudamericana first stage
12	Argentinos Juniors	27	12	5	10	36	30	+6	41	Qualification for Copa Sudamericana first stage
13	Belgrano	27	10	10	7	29	28	+1	40	
14	Vélez Sarsfield	27	10	8	9	31	32	−1	38	
15	Atlético Tucumán	27	8	12	7	29	26	+3	36	

Source: AFA
Rules for classification: 1) points; 2) play-off (only if needed to decide championship); 3) goal difference; 4) goals scored; 5) head-to-head points; 6) head-to-head goal difference; 7) head-to-head goals scored.

=== Results by matchday ===
Matchday	1	2	3	4	5	6	7	8	9	10	11	12	13	14	15	16	17	18	19	20	21	22	23	24	25	26	27
Ground	A	H	A	H	A	H	A	H	A	H	A	H	A														
Result	L	W	W	D	D	D	L	D	W	W	D	W															
Position	21	12	7	11	11	15	17	17	13	9	12	9															

Updated to match(es) played on 12 December 2017. Source: Soccerway
A = Away; H = Home; W = Win; D = Draw; L = Loss

25 August 2017 1	Banfield (Argentina)	2–1	(Argentina) Belgrano	Banfield, Argentina
21:05	G. Bettini 13'; D. Cvitanich 15' (pen.)	Report	C. Lema 88'	Stadium: Estadio Florencio Sola; Referee: Germán Delfino (Argentina)

9 September 2017 2	Belgrano (Argentina)	1–0	(Argentina) San Martín (SJ)	Córdoba, Argentina
14:05	E. García 66'	Report		Stadium: El Gigante de Alberdi; Referee: Andrés Merlos (Argentina)

16 September 2017 3	Argentinos Juniors (Argentina)	1–2	(Argentina) Belgrano	Buenos Aires, Argentina
14:05	N. González 18'	Report	E. García 34'; C. Lema 47'	Stadium: Estadio Diego Armando Maradona; Referee: Hernán Mastrángelo (Argentina)

22 September 2017 4	Belgrano (Argentina)	0–0	(Argentina) Tigre	Córdoba, Argentina
19:05		Report		Stadium: El Gigante de Alberdi; Referee: Federico Beligoy (Argentina)

29 September 2017 5	Atlético Tucumán (Argentina)	0–0	(Argentina) Belgrano	San Miguel de Tucumán, Argentina
21:05		Report		Stadium: Estadio Monumental José Fierro; Referee: Darío Herrera (Argentina)

15 October 2017 6	Belgrano (Argentina)	0–0	(Argentina) Talleres	Córdoba, Argentina
16:05		Report		Stadium: El Gigante de Alberdi; Referee: Ariel Penel (Argentina)

29 October 2017 7	Boca Juniors (Argentina)	4–0	(Argentina) Belgrano	Buenos Aires, Argentina
18:05	L. Acosta 15' (o.g.); E. Cardona 43'; D. Benedetto 63', 78'	Report		Stadium: La Bombonera; Referee: Silvio Trucco (Argentina)

5 November 2017 8	Belgrano (Argentina)	0–0	(Argentina) Independiente	Córdoba, Argentina
14:05		Report		Stadium: Estadio Mario Alberto Kempes; Referee: Mauro Vigliano (Argentina)

17 November 2017 9	Newell's Old Boys (Argentina)	0–1	(Argentina) Belgrano	Rosario, Argentina
21:30		Report	J. Amoroso 89'	Stadium: Estadio Marcelo Bielsa; Referee: Pedro Argañaraz (Argentina)

25 November 2017 10	Belgrano (Argentina)	2–0	(Argentina) Gimnasia y Esgrima	Córdoba, Argentina
17:00	F. Brener 83'; J. Brunetta 90+4'	Report		Stadium: El Gigante de Alberdi; Referee: Juan Pompei (Argentina)

1 December 2017 11	Unión Santa Fe (Argentina)	1–1	(Argentina) Belgrano	Santa Fe, Argentina
17:00	F. Fragapane 27'	Report	E. Godoy 59'	Stadium: Estadio 15 de Abril; Referee: Germán Delfino (Argentina)

8 December 2017 12	Belgrano (Argentina)	1–0	(Argentina) Huracán	Córdoba, Argentina
21:30	M. Suárez 83'	Report		Stadium: El Gigante de Alberdi; Referee: Darío Herrera (Argentina)

January 2018 13	Olimpo (Argentina)	–	(Argentina) Belgrano	Bahía Blanca, Argentina
		Report		Stadium: Estadio Roberto Natalio Carminatti

== Copa Argentina ==
Win Draw Loss

2 September 2017 R32	Defensores de Belgrano (Argentina)	1–1 (5–6 p)	(Argentina) Belgrano	Cutral Có, Argentina
15:00	Á. Prudencio 86' (pen.)	Report	J. Ramis 2'	Stadium: Estadio El Coloso del Ruca Quimey; Referee: Nicolás Lamolina (Argentina)
	Penalties
	A. Leguizamón (penalty scored); J. Bonetto (penalty scored); Á. Prudencio (penalty scored); A. Moreno (penalty scored); M. Coronel (penalty missed); J. Zules (penalty scored); H. Rubén (penalty missed)		J. Ortiz (penalty missed); J. Ramis (penalty scored); C. Lema (penalty scored); E. Godoy (penalty scored); J. Quiroga (penalty scored); F. Lértora (penalty scored); M. Benítez (penalty scored)

9 October 2017 R16	Belgrano (Argentina)	1–2	(Argentina) Atlanta	Santa Fe, Argentina
18:00	F. Lértora 90+4'	Report	F. Pedrozo 55'; A. Martínez 63'	Stadium: Estadio 15 de Abril; Referee: Diego Abal (Argentina)
