= Volpin =

Volpin (Russian: Во́льпин), sometimes also transliterated Wolpin, is a Russian surname.

Notable people with this surname include:

== Volpin ==
- Alexander Esenin-Volpin (1924-2016), Russian-American poet and mathematician
- Mikhail Volpin (1902-1988), Soviet screenwriter

== Wolpin ==
- Kenneth Wolpin, American economist

== See also ==
- Volpini
- Volpino
