= Juan Quiroga =

Juan Quiroga may refer to:

- Juan Facundo Quiroga (1788–1835), Argentine caudillo
- Juan Quiroga (footballer, born 1973), former Chilean footballer
- Juan Quiroga (footballer, born 1982), Argentine footballer
