= Leandro Fernández =

Leandro Fernández may refer to:

- Leandro Fernández (historian) (1889–1948), Filipino historian
- Leandro Fernández (footballer, born 1983), Argentine footballer
- Leandro Fernández (footballer, born 1991), Argentine footballer
- Leandro Fernández (footballer, born 1995), Argentine footballer
- Leandro Fernández (artist), Argentine comic book artist
- Leandro Fernández (actor), Colombian musician, actor, director
- Leandro Fernández de Moratín (1760–1828), Spanish dramatist, translator and neoclassical poet
