= Arián Pucheta =

Argentine footballer

Personal information
- Full name: Arián Benjamín Pucheta
- Date of birth: 8 March 1995 (age 31)
- Place of birth: El Colorado, Argentina
- Height: 1.80 m (5 ft 11 in)
- Position: Centre-back

Team information
- Current team: Manta F.C.

Youth career
- Boca Juniors

Senior career*
Years	Team	Apps	(Gls)
2016–2019	San Martín	32	(0)
2020	Ferro Carril Oeste	0	(0)
2020–2021	Central Norte	5	(0)
2021	Orense	4	(0)
2023-2024	Cumbayá	4	(0)

International career
2011	Argentina U17	6	(0)
- * Club domestic league appearances and goals as of 13:49, 28 March 2021 (UTC)

Arián Benjamín Pucheta (born 8 March 1995) is an Argentine professional footballer who plays as a centre-back for Manta F.C.

== Club career ==
Pucheta had a period of his youth career with Boca Juniors, prior to joining San Martín. He was promoted into San Martín's squad during the 2016–17 Argentine Primera División season, first appearing as an unused substitute for a 6–1 defeat to Newell's Old Boys on 18 December 2016. In the following March, Pucheta made his professional debut against Huracán at the Estadio San Juan del Bicentenario. Another three appearances occurred in 2016–17. He terminated his contract at the end of 2019, following thirty-six total appearances. In January 2020, Pucheta joined fellow Primera B Nacional team Ferro Carril Oeste.

Pucheta ended his Ferro contract in November 2020, having not appeared competitively for the club; due to the COVID-19 pandemic and minor injury. A move to Torneo Federal A with Central Norte soon followed, as the centre-back appeared five times before departing; notably receiving a red card in his final appearance on 3 January 2021 versus Atlético Güemes. Days later, on 7 January, Pucheta was announced as a new signing by Ecuadorian Serie A side Orense.

== International career ==
Pucheta was selected for the 2011 South American Under-17 Football Championship by Argentina U17 manager Oscar Garré. He subsequently won six caps as Argentina finished third.

== Career statistics ==
As of 8 January 2021.

Club statistics
Club	Season	League			Cup		League Cup		Continental		Other		Total	
Club	Season	Division	Apps	Goals	Apps	Goals	Apps	Goals	Apps	Goals	Apps	Goals	Apps	Goals
San Martín	2016–17	Primera División	4	0	0	0	—		—		0	0	4	0
San Martín	2017–18	Primera División	7	0	0	0	—		—		0	0	7	0
San Martín	2018–19	Primera División	17	0	1	0	2	0	—		0	0	20	0
San Martín	2019–20	Primera B Nacional	4	0	1	0	—		—		0	0	5	0
San Martín	Total		32	0	2	0	2	0	—		0	0	36	0
Ferro Carril Oeste	2019–20	Primera B Nacional	0	0	0	0	—		—		0	0	0	0
Central Norte	2020	Torneo Federal A	0	0	0	0	—		—		0	0	0	0
Orense	2021	Serie A	0	0	0	0	—		—		0	0	0	0
Career total			32	0	2	0	2	0	—		0	0	36	0
