= Gustavo Toledo =

Argentine footballer

Personal information
- Full name: Gustavo Ariel Toledo
- Date of birth: 19 September 1989 (age 37)
- Place of birth: Avellaneda, Argentina
- Height: 1.75 m (5 ft 9 in)
- Position: Right-back

Youth career
- Banfield

Senior career*
Years	Team	Apps	(Gls)
2010–2015	Banfield	105	(2)
2015–2018	Independiente	52	(0)
2017–2018	→ Colón (loan)	22	(1)
2018–2019	Colón	41	(1)
2019–2021	Atlético Tucumán	9	(0)
- * Club domestic league appearances and goals

Gustavo Ariel Toledo (born 19 September 1989) is a retired Argentine professional footballer who played as a right-back.

== Career ==
Toledo began his career with Primera División side Banfield, firstly in the youth teams before making his first-team debut in 2010 versus Racing Club de Avellaneda. In his first three seasons as a professional, Toledo made twenty-one appearances in the top-flight before the club were relegated to Primera B Nacional, this saw Toledo become a regular member as he played fifty-five league matches over two seasons as Banfield were promoted back into the Primera División at the second time of asking. Nineteen more league appearances came for Toledo in 2014 before, in 2015, he left Banfield to join fellow Primera División side Independiente.

On 15 February 2015, Toledo made his Independiente league debut in a 2–3 away win against Newell's Old Boys. On 19 July 2017, Toledo joined fellow Primera División team Colón on loan. His first match for Colón came on 24 September against Defensa y Justicia, they won 3–1. The 200th appearance of Toledo's career arrived on 7 May 2018 during a draw with River Plate. Colón completed the permanent signing of Toledo in July 2018.

In September 2021, Toledo announced his retirement from football.

== Career statistics ==
As of 10 September 2018.

Club statistics
Club	Season	League			Cup (Note: Includes the Copa Argentina)		League Cup		Continental (Note: Includes the Copa Libertadores and Copa Sudamericana)		Other		Total	
Club	Season	Division	Apps	Goals	Apps	Goals	Apps	Goals	Apps	Goals	Apps	Goals	Apps	Goals
Banfield	2009–10	Primera División	2	0	0	0	—		0	0	0	0	2	0
Banfield	2010–11	Primera División	17	1	0	0	—		2 (Note: Two appearances in 2010 Copa Sudamericana)	0	0	0	19	1
Banfield	2011–12	Primera División	12	0	2	0	—		—		0	0	14	0
Banfield	2012–13	Primera B Nacional	20	0	2	1	—		—		0	0	22	1
Banfield	2013–14	Primera B Nacional	35	1	0	0	—		—		0	0	35	1
Banfield	2014	Primera División	19	0	2	0	—		—		0	0	21	0
Banfield	Total		105	2	6	1	—		2	0	0	0	113	3
Independiente	2015	Primera División	29	0	2	0	—		6 (Note: Six appearances in 2015 Copa Sudamericana)	0	0	0	37	0
Independiente	2016	Primera División	14	0	1	0	—		—		0	0	15	0
Independiente	2016–17	Primera División	9	0	1	0	—		3 (Note: Three appearances in 2016 Copa Sudamericana)	0	0	0	13	0
Independiente	2017–18	Primera División	0	0	0	0	—		0	0	0	0	0	0
Independiente	Total		52	0	4	0	—		9	0	0	0	65	0
Colón (loan)	2017–18	Primera División	22	1	0	0	—		2 (Note: Two appearances in 2018 Copa Sudamericana)	0	0	0	24	1
Colón	2018–19	Primera División	4	0	2	0	—		2 (Note: Two appearances in 2018 Copa Sudamericana)	0	0	0	8	0
Colón	Total		26	1	2	0	—		4	0	0	0	32	1
Career total			183	3	12	1	—		15	0	0	0	210	4

== Honours ==
Banfield

- Argentine Primera División: 2009–10 Apertura
- Primera B Nacional: 2013–14
