= Elías Calderón =

Argentine footballer

Personal information
- Full name: Elías Calderón
- Date of birth: 4 March 2001 (age 25)
- Place of birth: Córdoba, Argentina
- Height: 1.88 m (6 ft 2 in)
- Position: Defender

Team information
- Current team: Central Norte (on loan from Belgrano)

Youth career
- 2016–2022: Belgrano

Senior career*
Years	Team	Apps	(Gls)
2023–	Belgrano	0	(0)
2023	→ Racing Córdoba (loan)	21	(1)
2024	→ Defensa y Justicia (loan)	5	(0)
2024	→ Deportes Copiapó (loan)	7	(0)
2025	→ Gimnasia Mendoza (loan)	4	(0)
2025	→ Racing Córdoba (loan)	13	(0)
2026–	→ Central Norte (loan)	0	(0)
- * Club domestic league appearances and goals as of 14:16, 13 March 2026 (UTC)

Elías Calderón (born 4 February 2001) is an Argentine footballer who plays as a defender for Central Norte, on loan from Belgrano.

== Club career ==
Born in Córdoba, Argentina, Calderón is a product of Belgrano. In 2023, Calderón was loaned out to Racing de Córdoba in the Primera B Nacional. In 2024, he was loaned out to Defensa y Justicia in the Argentine top level on a deal until December of the same year.

In the second half of 2024, Calderón moved on loan to Chile and joined Deportes Copiapó in the top division.
