= Central Norte =

Association football club in Argentina

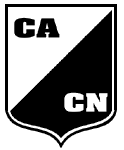
- Full name: Club Atlético Central Norte
- Nicknames: Cuervo; Azabache; Ferroviario
- Founded: 9 March 1921; 105 years ago
- Ground: Estadio Padre Ernesto Martearena; Salta, Argentina
- Capacity: 20,408
- Chairman: José Macaione
- Manager: Adrián Bastía
- League: Primera Nacional
- 2025: Primera Nacional Zone B, 15th of 18
Home colours	Away colours	Third colours

Club Atlético Central Norte is an Argentine football club from the city of Salta, from the Salta Province.

== History ==
Central Norte was founded in Salta on 9 March 1921, and took its name from the state-owned Ferrocarril Central Norte whose railway line crossed the Salta Province.

== Players ==
=== Current squad ===
As of 7 March 2026 Note: Flags indicate national team as defined under FIFA eligibility rules; some limited exceptions apply. Players may hold more than one non-FIFA nationality.

No.	Pos.	Nation	Player
—	GK	ARG	Enzo Vázquez
—	GK	ARG	Fabricio Hass
—	GK	ARG	Tobías Pantoja
—	DF	ARG	Agustín Lamosa (on loan from San Lorenzo de Almagro)
—	DF	ARG	Elías Calderón (on loan from Belgrano)
—	DF	ARG	Maximiliano Padilla (captain) (on loan from Gimnasia y Esgrima de Mendoza)
—	DF	ARG	Leonardo Felissia
—	DF	ARG	Arián Pucheta
—	DF	ARG	Gonzalo Castilla
—	DF	ARG	Ramiro Enríquez
—	DF	ARG	Agustín Aleo
—	DF	ARG	Pedro Sanz
—	DF	ARG	Mauricio Rosales
—	DF	ARG	Mauro Matorras
—	DF	ARG	Martín Lucero
—	MF	ARG	Matías Villarreal

No.	Pos.	Nation	Player
—	MF	ARG	Maximiliano Ribero
—	MF	ARG	Matías Moravec
—	MF	ARG	Gianluca Mancuso
—	MF	ARG	Agustín Bustinduy (on loan from Deportivo Maipú)
—	MF	ARG	Gonzalo Álvez (on loan from Talleres de Córdoba)
—	MF	ARG	Ronaldo Abondetto
—	MF	ARG	Kevin Fernández
—	MF	ARG	Joaquín Mateo
—	MF	ARG	Paolo Dorini
—	MF	ARG	Tiziano Cabrera
—	FW	ARG	Kevin Isa Luna
—	FW	ARG	Franco Vedoya
—	FW	ARG	Ramiro Costa
—	FW	ARG	Francisco Borda
—	FW	ARG	Tiago Taobas

== Titles ==
- Liga Salteña: 36
- Torneos Regionales: 7
- Torneo Federal A: 1

2024

- Torneo Argentino B: 2

2005–06, 2009–10
