= Francisco Mattia =

Argentine footballer

Personal information
- Full name: Juan Francisco Mattia
- Date of birth: 24 June 1988 (age 38)
- Place of birth: Luján, Argentina
- Height: 1.90 m (6 ft 3 in)
- Position: Centre-back

Team information
- Current team: Alvarado

Youth career
- Flandria

Senior career*
Years	Team	Apps	(Gls)
2006–2013	Flandria	100	(3)
2011–2013	→ San Martín SJ (loan)	20	(0)
2013–2021	San Martín SJ	161	(6)
2022–	Alvarado	9	(1)
- * Club domestic league appearances and goals as of 17:35, 26 July 2022 (UTC)

Juan Francisco Mattia (born 24 June 1988) is an Argentine professional footballer who plays as a centre-back for Primera Nacional side Alvarado.

== Career ==
Mattia started off his career in Primera B Metropolitana with Flandria in 2006. Five years later, after three goals in one hundred appearances for the club, Mattia left Flandria to join San Martín of the Argentine Primera División on loan. His debut arrived on 26 November 2011 during a 0–3 win away to Olimpo. In June 2013, San Martín signed Mattia permanently. On 4 August, Mattia scored his first club goal versus Aldosivi in Primera B Nacional; following relegation in the previous season. In his first seven seasons, he made one hundred and forty-two appearances and scored four times for San Martín in all competitions.

After 10 years at San Martín SJ, Mattia joined Primera Nacional side Alvarado ahead of the 2022 season.

== Career statistics ==
As of 10 May 2018.

Club statistics
Club	Season	League			Cup (Note: Includes the Copa Argentina)		League Cup		Continental		Other		Total	
Club	Season	Division	Apps	Goals	Apps	Goals	Apps	Goals	Apps	Goals	Apps	Goals	Apps	Goals
San Martín (loan)	2011–12	Primera División	3	0	0	0	—		—		1 (Note: One appearance in 2011–12 Primera División play-offs)	0	4	0
San Martín (loan)	2012–13	Primera División	17	0	0	0	—		—		0	0	17	0
San Martín	2013–14	Primera B Nacional	36	1	0	0	—		—		0	0	36	1
San Martín	2014	Primera B Nacional	19	1	1	0	—		—		0	0	20	1
San Martín	2015	Primera División	28	0	1	0	—		—		1 (Note: One appearance in 2015 Primera División play-offs)	0	30	0
San Martín	2016	Primera División	11	1	0	0	—		—		0	0	11	1
San Martín	2016–17	Primera División	24	1	0	0	—		—		0	0	24	1
San Martín	2017–18	Primera División	0	0	0	0	—		—		0	0	0	0
Career total			138	4	2	0	—		—		2	0	142	4
