= Gustavo Villarruel =

Argentine footballer

Personal information
- Full name: Gustavo Alejandro Villarruel
- Date of birth: 23 February 1993 (age 33)
- Place of birth: San Lorenzo, Argentina
- Height: 1.72 m (5 ft 7 1/2 in)
- Position: Forward

Team information
- Current team: Ferro de General Pico

Senior career*
Years	Team	Apps	(Gls)
2014–2017	Colón	48	(6)
2016–2017	→ San Martín SJ (loan)	30	(4)
2017–2019	San Martín SJ	19	(1)
2019–2020	Tigre	9	(0)
2020–2021	Instituto	39	(2)
2022	Güemes	16	(0)
2023	San Telmo	25	(2)
2024	Ciudad Bolívar	20	(1)
2025-	Ferro de General Pico		
- * Club domestic league appearances and goals as of 11:59, 08 January 2026 (UTC)

Gustavo Alejandro Villarruel (born 23 February 1993) is an Argentine professional footballer who plays as a forward for Ferro de General Pico in the Torneo Regional Federal Amateur of Argentina.

== Career ==
Villarruel started his Colón career in 2014, making his debut on 4 March in an Argentine Primera División draw at home to Godoy Cruz. In total, he made five appearances in his first season of 2013–14 which finished with relegation. In Primera B Nacional, Villarruel scored in four straight matches throughout August and September 2014 with goals against Gimnasia y Esgrima, Nueva Chicago, Aldosivi and Guaraní Antonio Franco. One further goal arrived versus Ferro Carril Oeste during 2014 as the club won instant promotion back to the Primera División. He played twenty-four times and scored once in the subsequent season.

On 2 February 2016, Villarruel joined fellow top-flight team San Martín on loan until June 2017. He made his first appearance in a 4–3 defeat to Huracán on 9 April. He went on to feature in thirty games and scored four goals across 2016 and 2016–17. In June 2017, San Martín signed Villarruel permanently.

After passing through Ciudad Bolívar, In August 2025 he became a player for Ferro de General Pico.

== Career statistics ==
As of 10 September 2018.

Club statistics
Club	Season	League			Cup (Note: Includes the Copa Argentina)		League Cup		Continental (Note: Includes the Copa Sudamericana)		Other		Total	
Club	Season	Division	Apps	Goals	Apps	Goals	Apps	Goals	Apps	Goals	Apps	Goals	Apps	Goals
Colón	2013–14	Primera División	5	0	0	0	—		—		0	0	5	0
Colón	2014	Primera B Nacional	19	5	2	0	—		—		0	0	21	5
Colón	2015	Primera División	24	1	1	0	—		—		0	0	25	1
Colón	2016	Primera División	0	0	0	0	—		—		0	0	0	0
Colón	2016–17	Primera División	0	0	0	0	—		—		0	0	0	0
Colón	2017–18	Primera División	0	0	0	0	—		0	0	0	0	0	0
Colón	Total		48	6	3	0	—		0	0	0	0	51	6
San Martín (loan)	2016	Primera División	5	0	0	0	—		—		0	0	5	0
San Martín (loan)	2016–17	Primera División	25	4	0	0	—		—		0	0	25	4
San Martín	2017–18	Primera División	6	0	0	0	—		—		0	0	6	0
San Martín	2018–19	Primera División	0	0	0	0	—		—		0	0	0	0
San Martín	Total		36	4	0	0	—		—		0	0	36	4
Career total			84	10	3	0	—		0	0	0	0	87	10
