= Pablo Heredia =

Argentine-born Chilean footballer

Personal information
- Full name: Pablo Nicolás Heredia
- Date of birth: 11 June 1990 (age 36)
- Place of birth: Río Grande, Argentina
- Height: 1.84 m (6 ft 1/2 in)
- Position: Goalkeeper

Youth career
- San Martín Río Grande
- 2005–2011: Belgrano

Senior career*
Years	Team	Apps	(Gls)
2011–2018	Belgrano	9	(0)
2016–2017	→ Central Córdoba SdE (loan)	11	(0)
2019	Unión La Calera	0	(0)
2020–2021	San Luis	36	(0)
2022–2023	Unión San Felipe	35	(0)

International career
2008	Argentina U20	2	(0)
- * Club domestic league appearances and goals as of 13 May 2024

Pablo Nicolás Heredia (born 11 June 1990) is an Argentine-Chilean. professional footballer who plays as a goalkeeper.

== Career ==
=== Club ===
Born in Río Grande, Argentina, Heredia began with San Martin de Río Grande, prior to joining Belgrano in 2005. Six years later, he was an unused substitute for games against Ferro Carril Oeste and San Martín (SJ) in the 2010–11 Primera B Nacional season which ended with the club being promoted to the Argentine Primera División. Five further unused sub appearances followed in 2012–13 in all competitions, prior to him making his professional debut on 16 February 2014 in an away league win over Boca Juniors at La Bombonera. Heredia went onto make ten appearances, including two in the 2015 Copa Sudamericana, in the next three seasons.

In July 2016, Heredia joined Central Córdoba of Primera B Nacional on loan. He played twelve times throughout 2016–17, as Central Córdoba was relegated, before returning to Belgrano. He terminated his contract with Belgrano at the end of 2018. On 17 January 2019, Heredia completed a move to Chile's Unión La Calera.

In January 2022, he signed with Unión San Felipe.

=== International ===
Heredia played for the Argentina U20s in 2008, making two appearances against South Korea.

== Personal life ==
Heredia holds dual Argentine-Chilean nationality, since his maternal grandfather is Chilean.

Heredia is the cousin of the also Argentine-Chilean footballer Luis Kovacic.

== Career statistics ==
As of 17 January 2019.

Club statistics
Club	Season	League			Cup		League Cup		Continental		Other		Total	
Club	Season	Division	Apps	Goals	Apps	Goals	Apps	Goals	Apps	Goals	Apps	Goals	Apps	Goals
Belgrano	2010–11	Primera B Nacional	0	0	0	0	—		—		0	0	0	0
Belgrano	2011–12	Argentine Primera División	0	0	0	0	—		—		0	0	0	0
Belgrano	2012–13	Argentine Primera División	0	0	0	0	—		—		0	0	0	0
Belgrano	2013–14	Argentine Primera División	4	0	0	0	—		0	0	0	0	4	0
Belgrano	2014	Argentine Primera División	4	0	0	0	—		—		0	0	4	0
Belgrano	2015	Argentine Primera División	1	0	0	0	—		2 (Note: Appearance(s) in the Copa Sudamericana)	0	0	0	3	0
Belgrano	2016	Argentine Primera División	0	0	0	0	—		—		0	0	0	0
Belgrano	2016–17	Argentine Primera División	0	0	0	0	—		0	0	0	0	0	0
Belgrano	2017–18	Argentine Primera División	0	0	0	0	—		—		0	0	0	0
Belgrano	2018–19	Argentine Primera División	0	0	0	0	—		—		0	0	0	0
Belgrano	Total		9	0	0	0	—		2	0	0	0	11	0
Central Córdoba (loan)	2016–17	Primera B Nacional	11	0	1	0	—		—		0	0	12	0
Unión La Calera	2019	Chilean Primera División	0	0	0	0	—		0	0	0	0	0	0
Career total			20	0	1	0	—		2	0	0	0	23	0
