= Santiago Martínez (footballer, born 1991) =

Uruguayan footballer

Personal information
- Full name: Santiago Gabriel Martínez Pintos
- Date of birth: 30 July 1991 (age 35)
- Place of birth: Salto, Uruguay
- Height: 1.70 m (5 ft 7 in)
- Position: Central midfielder

Team information
- Current team: La Luz
- Number: 5

Youth career
- Montevideo Wanderers

Senior career*
Years	Team	Apps	(Gls)
2011–2021	Montevideo Wanderers	194	(3)
2014	→ Quilmes (loan)	6	(0)
2017–2018	→ Belgrano (loan)	17	(0)
2019–2020	→ Atlante (loan)	25	(0)
2021–2022	Cerro Largo	38	(0)
2023	Atenas	29	(1)
2024–	La Luz	11	(0)
- * Club domestic league appearances and goals as of 20:46, 25 July 2024 (UTC)

Santiago Gabriel Martínez Pintos (born 30 July 1991) is a Uruguayan professional footballer who plays as a central midfielder for La Luz.

== Club career ==
Martínez started his senior career in 2011 with Montevideo Wanderers, making his professional debut in a 5–1 Uruguayan Primera División win against El Tanque Sisley on 3 April. He went onto make six appearances during 2010–11 prior to playing twenty-six times in 2011–12, a season in which Martínez accumulated twelve yellow cards and three red cards. He scored his first career goal in 2012–13's first match, an away win vs. Cerro Largo. In July 2014, Martínez joined Argentine Primera División side Quilmes on loan. He was sent off in his second start against Defensa y Justicia. Overall, he made six appearances.

He returned to Montevideo Wanderers in January 2015 and subsequently made eighty-three appearances and scored once in the following four seasons. On 10 July 2017, Martínez completed a loan move to Belgrano of the Argentine Primera División. He returned to Montevideo Wanderers in June 2018. His 200th career appearance arrived on 4 August versus Peñarol. After featuring twenty-four times back with his parent team, Martínez was loaned out for a third time in June 2019 as he joined Ascenso MX side Atlante.

== International career ==
He received a Uruguay U20 call-up for the 2011 FIFA U-20 World Cup in Colombia, but was an unused substitute in all three Group B fixtures as Uruguay were eliminated at the group stages.

== Career statistics ==
As of 19 June 2019.

Club statistics
Club	Season	League			Cup		Continental		Other		Total	
Club	Season	Division	Apps	Goals	Apps	Goals	Apps	Goals	Apps	Goals	Apps	Goals
Montevideo Wanderers	2010–11	Uruguayan Primera División	6	0	—		0	0	0	0	6	0
Montevideo Wanderers	2011–12	Uruguayan Primera División	26	0	—		0	0	0	0	26	0
Montevideo Wanderers	2012–13	Uruguayan Primera División	24	2	—		0	0	0	0	24	2
Montevideo Wanderers	2013–14	Uruguayan Primera División	28	0	—		2 (Note: Appearance(s) in the Copa Sudamericana)	0	3 (Note: Appearance(s) in the Uruguayan Primera División play-offs)	0	33	0
Montevideo Wanderers	2014–15	Uruguayan Primera División	10	0	—		8 (Note: Appearance(s) in the Copa Libertadores)	0	0	0	18	0
Montevideo Wanderers	2015–16	Uruguayan Primera División	18	0	—		0	0	0	0	18	0
Montevideo Wanderers	2016	Uruguayan Primera División	15	1	—		6	0	0	0	21	1
Montevideo Wanderers	2017	Uruguayan Primera División	22	0	—		4	0	0	0	26	0
Montevideo Wanderers	2018	Uruguayan Primera División	8	0	—		0	0	0	0	8	0
Montevideo Wanderers	2019	Uruguayan Primera División	12	0	—		4	0	0	0	16	0
Montevideo Wanderers	Total		169	3	—		24	0	3	0	196	3
Quilmes (loan)	2014	Argentine Primera División	6	0	1	0	—		0	0	7	0
Belgrano (loan)	2017–18	Argentine Primera División	17	0	3	0	—		0	0	20	0
Atlante (loan)	2019–20	Ascenso MX	0	0	0	0	—		0	0	0	0
Career total			175	3	4	0	24	0	3	0	206	3
