= Gonzalo Álvez =

Argentine association football player (born 2003)

Personal information
- Full name: Maximiliano Gonzalo Álvez
- Date of birth: 23 November 2003 (age 22)
- Place of birth: San Lorenzo
- Height: 1.69 m (5 ft 6 1/2 in)
- Position: Midfielder

Team information
- Current team: Central Norte (on loan from Talleres de Córdoba)

Youth career
- –2022: Talleres de Córdoba

Senior career*
| Years | Team | Apps | (Gls) |
| 2022– | Talleres de Córdoba | 15 | (2) |
| 2023 | → Central Córdoba (loan) | 12 | (0) |
| 2024–2025 | → Independiente Rivadavia (loan) | 6 | (0) |
| 2025– | → Central Norte (loan) | 16 | (1) |
- * Club domestic league appearances and goals as of 17:21, 24 April 2026 (UTC)

Maximiliano Gonzalo Álvez (born 23 November 2003) is an Argentine professional footballer who plays as a midfielder for Central Norte in the Primera Nacional, on loan from Talleres de Córdoba.

== Early life ==
He was born in San Lorenzo, Santa Fe.

== Club career ==
He is a youth product of Talleres de Córdoba, and signed his first professional contract with the club in August 2020. That year he also had his first preseason with the senior first team squad. He made his senior debut in 2022 at the age of 18 years-old against Newells Old Boys. In March 2023, he signed a three-year contract extension.

He played on loan in the Argentine Primera Division for Central Córdoba de Santiago del Estero from August 2023. In 2024, he played for Independiente Rivadavia on loan, featuring for club on both left and right flanks.

== International career ==
He played at youth level for Argentina U16. In February 2022, he was called up to play for Argentina U20 by manager Javier Mascherano.
