= Leonardo Sequeira =

Argentine footballer

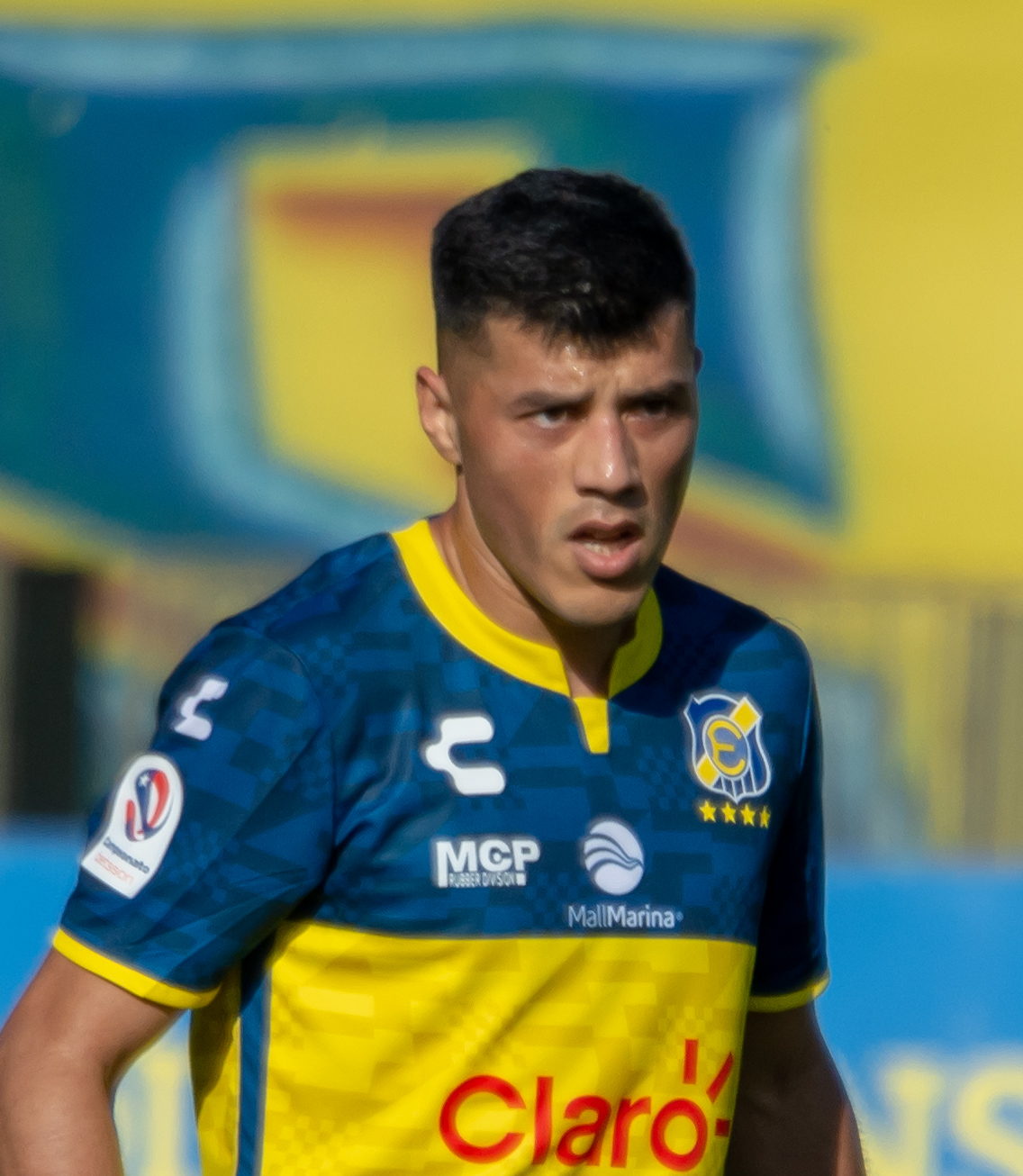
- Sequeira with Everton in 2023

Personal information
- Full name: Leonardo Exequiel Sequeira
- Date of birth: 26 April 1995 (age 31)
- Place of birth: La Banda, Argentina
- Height: 1.70 m (5 ft 7 in)
- Position: Winger

Team information
- Current team: Central Córdoba SdE (on loan from Huracán)
- Number: 28

Youth career
- Agua y Energía
- Vélez de San Ramón

Senior career*
Years	Team	Apps	(Gls)
2014–2018	Central Córdoba SdE	85	(9)
2017–2018	→ Belgrano (loan)	22	(1)
2018–2022	Belgrano	67	(4)
2021	→ Central Córdoba SdE (loan)	29	(6)
2022	→ Querétaro (loan)	29	(4)
2023	Real Oviedo	12	(1)
2023–2025	Everton	14	(2)
2024	→ Peñarol (loan)	28	(7)
2025–	Huracán	36	(1)
2026–	→ Central Córdoba SdE (loan)	12	(3)
- * Club domestic league appearances and goals as of 17:27, 12 November 2026 (UTC)

Leonardo Exequiel Sequeira (born 26 April 1995) is an Argentine professional footballer who plays as a winger for Central Córdoba SdE, on loan from Huracán.

== Career ==
Sequeira started his career in Santiago del Estero with Central Córdoba, after youth spells with Agua y Energía and Vélez de San Ramón. He made his senior debut on 26 March 2014 versus Gimnasia y Esgrima, playing the final twenty-five minutes in a 1–0 Torneo Federal A win. In the following November, Sequeira scored his first goal in a win against Unión Aconquija which secured promotion to the 2015 Primera B Nacional. He went on to score eight goals in sixty-nine matches in the second tier. On 16 August 2017, Sequeira joined Argentine Primera División side Belgrano on loan. His top-flight debut came vs. Tigre on 22 September.

He made his 100th career appearance during a draw away to Defensa y Justicia on 12 March 2018. Belgrano purchased Sequeira permanently at the conclusion of the 2017–18 campaign. On 10 December 2021, Sequeira signed a new deal with Belgrano until the end of 2023 and was simultaneously loaned out to Liga MX club Querétaro for the 2022 season, with a purchase option.

In 2023, Sequeira moved to Chile and joined Everton de Viña del Mar. In November of the same year, he renewed his contract until December 2025. The next year, he moved on loan to Uruguayan club Peñarol.

== Career statistics ==
As of 17 May 2018

Club statistics
Club	Season	League			Cup (Note: Includes the Copa Argentina)		League Cup		Continental		Other		Total	
Club	Season	Division	Apps	Goals	Apps	Goals	Apps	Goals	Apps	Goals	Apps	Goals	Apps	Goals
Central Córdoba	2013–14	Torneo Argentino A	6	0	1	0	—		—		0	0	7	0
Central Córdoba	2014	Torneo Federal A	10	0	0	0	—		—		0	0	10	0
Central Córdoba	2015	Primera B Nacional	24	0	0	0	—		—		0	0	24	0
Central Córdoba	2016	Primera B Nacional	9	0	0	0	—		—		0	0	9	0
Central Córdoba	2016–17	Primera B Nacional	36	0	0	0	—		—		0	0	36	0
Central Córdoba	2017–18	Torneo Federal A	0	0	0	0	—		—		0	0	0	0
Central Córdoba	Total		85	9	1	0	—		—		0	0	86	9
Belgrano (loan)	2017–18	Primera División	22	1	0	0	—		—		0	0	22	1
Career total			107	10	1	0	—		—		0	0	108	10
