= Maximiliano Algañaraz =

Argentine footballer

Personal information
- Full name: Maximiliano Daniel Algañaraz
- Date of birth: 14 July 1996 (age 30)
- Place of birth: Rawson, Argentina
- Height: 1.83 m (6 ft 0 in)
- Positions: Defender; midfielder

Team information
- Current team: Atenas

Youth career
- Trinidad

Senior career*
Years	Team	Apps	(Gls)
2014–2015	Trinidad	5	(0)
2015–2018	San Martín	0	(0)
2019	Juventud Alianza	6	(0)
2019	Defensores de Belgrano	4	(0)
2020–	Atenas	3	(0)
- * Club domestic league appearances and goals as of 20:35, 26 October 2020 (UTC)

Maximiliano Daniel Algañaraz (born 14 July 1996) is an Argentine professional footballer who plays as a defender or midfielder for Atenas.

== Career ==
Algañaraz began his footballing career with Trinidad, making five first-team appearances in the 2014 Torneo Federal B. March 2015 saw Algañaraz join San Martín of the Primera División. Before making his senior debut, he was an unused substitute for a league match with Newell's Old Boys on 18 December 2016. His competitive bow for them arrived six months later during a Copa Argentina home loss to Atlanta. Algañaraz didn't play in a league match for San Martín, departing at the end of 2018. A move to Juventud Alianza of Torneo Regional Federal Amateur was completed in early 2019. Six appearances followed.

In July 2019, Torneo Federal A club Defensores de Belgrano signed Algañaraz. His debut arrived on 31 August against Sarmiento, which preceded a further three matches for the club. January 2020 saw Algañaraz, following a trial, join fourth tier outfit Atenas.

== Career statistics ==
As of 26 October 2020.

Club statistics
Club	Season	League			Cup		League Cup		Continental		Other		Total	
Club	Season	Division	Apps	Goals	Apps	Goals	Apps	Goals	Apps	Goals	Apps	Goals	Apps	Goals
Trinidad	2014	Torneo Federal B	5	0	0	0	—		—		0	0	5	0
San Martín	2015	Primera División	0	0	0	0	—		—		0	0	0	0
San Martín	2016	Primera División	0	0	0	0	—		—		0	0	0	0
San Martín	2016–17	Primera División	0	0	1	0	—		—		0	0	1	0
San Martín	2017–18	Primera División	0	0	0	0	—		—		0	0	0	0
San Martín	2018–19	Primera División	0	0	0	0	0	0	—		0	0	0	0
San Martín	Total		0	0	1	0	0	0	—		0	0	1	0
Juventud Alianza	2019	Torneo Amateur	6	0	0	0	—		—		0	0	6	0
Defensores de Belgrano	2019–20	Torneo Federal A	4	0	0	0	—		—		0	0	4	0
Atenas	2020	Torneo Amateur	3	0	0	0	—		—		0	0	3	0
Career total			18	0	1	0	0	0	—		0	0	19	0
