= Joaquín Rikemberg =

Argentine footballer

Personal information
- Full name: Joaquín Nehemias Rikemberg
- Date of birth: 4 January 1999 (age 27)
- Place of birth: Neuquén, Argentina
- Height: 1.66 m (5 ft 5 in)
- Position: Midfielder

Team information
- Current team: Círculo Deportivo

Youth career
- 2012–2016: Belgrano

Senior career*
Years	Team	Apps	(Gls)
2016–2022	Belgrano	1	(0)
2019–2020	→ Villa Mitre (loan)	7	(0)
2021	→ Ferro General Pico (loan)	23	(4)
2022	→ Villa Dálmine (loan)	6	(0)
2022	→ Cipolletti (loan)	7	(0)
2022	CSD Colon		
2023–	Círculo Deportivo	15	(1)
- * Club domestic league appearances and goals as of 19:24, 25 July 2023 (UTC)

Joaquín Nehemias Rikemberg (born 4 January 1999) is an Argentine professional footballer who plays as a midfielder for Círculo Deportivo.

== Career ==
Rikemberg started his professional career with Argentine Primera División side Belgrano, making his debut on 18 December 2016 in a match versus Rosario Central. Before his debut, Rikemberg was an unused substitute in a game against Tigre on 6 November.

== Career statistics ==
As of 15 May 2018.

Club statistics
Club	Season	League			Cup (Note: Includes the Copa Argentina)		League Cup		Continental (Note: Includes the Copa Sudamericana)		Other		Total	
Club	Season	Division	Apps	Goals	Apps	Goals	Apps	Goals	Apps	Goals	Apps	Goals	Apps	Goals
Belgrano	2016–17	Primera División	1	0	0	0	—		0	0	0	0	1	0
Belgrano	2017–18	Primera División	0	0	0	0	—		—		0	0	0	0
Career total			1	0	0	0	—		0	0	0	0	1	0
