= Germán Gaitán =

Argentine footballer (born 1995)

Personal information
- Full name: Germán Emmanuel Gaitán
- Date of birth: 31 July 1995 (age 31)
- Place of birth: Córdoba, Argentina
- Height: 1.65 m (5 ft 5 in)
- Position: Attacking midfielder

Youth career
- 2003–2015: Belgrano

Senior career*
Years	Team	Apps	(Gls)
2015–2018	Belgrano	2	(0)
2018	→ Colegiales (loan)	11	(3)
2018–2019	Colegiales	20	(0)
2019	Chaco For Ever	1	(0)
- * Club domestic league appearances and goals

Germán Emmanuel Gaitán (born 31 July 1995) is an Argentine professional footballer who plays as an attacking midfielder.

== Career ==
After signing a professional contract with Primera División side Belgrano in November 2015, Gaitán made his debut for the club on 24 May 2016 in a 1–0 win against Rosario Central. In the following August, Gaitán appeared in continental competition for the first time after making his bow in the 2016 Copa Sudamericana versus Estudiantes. On 26 January 2018, Gaitán was signed on loan by Colegiales of Primera B Metropolitana. He scored his first career goal on 18 March against Sacachispas. Gaitán joined Colegiales permanently in August 2018. After one season, Gaitán headed to Chaco For Ever of Torneo Federal A.

== Career statistics ==
As of 31 August 2020.

Club statistics
Club	Season	League			Cup		League Cup		Continental		Other		Total	
Club	Season	Division	Apps	Goals	Apps	Goals	Apps	Goals	Apps	Goals	Apps	Goals	Apps	Goals
Belgrano	2015	Primera División	0	0	0	0	—		0	0	0	0	0	0
Belgrano	2016	Primera División	1	0	0	0	—		—		0	0	1	0
Belgrano	2016–17	Primera División	1	0	0	0	—		1 (Note: One appearance in 2016 Copa Sudamericana)	0	0	0	2	0
Belgrano	2017–18	Primera División	0	0	0	0	—		—		0	0	0	0
Belgrano	Total		2	0	0	0	—		1	0	0	0	3	0
Colegiales (loan)	2017–18	Primera B Metropolitana	11	3	0	0	—		—		0	0	11	3
Colegiales	2018–19	Primera B Metropolitana	20	0	0	0	—		—		0	0	20	0
Colegiales	Total		31	3	0	0	—		—		0	0	31	3
Chaco For Ever	2019–20	Torneo Federal A	1	0	0	0	—		—		0	0	1	0
Career total			34	3	0	0	—		1	0	0	0	35	3
