= Volpini =

Volpini may refer to:

- Arzani-Volpini, also known as Scuderia Volpini, Italian Formula One constructor
- Augusto Volpini (1832–1911), Italian painter
- Braian Volpini (born 1998), Argentinian footballer
- The Volpini Exhibition, 1889
- Xavier Tondo Volpini (1978-2011), Spanish cyclist

== See also ==
- Volpino
- Vulpini
