= Tomás Sandoval =

Argentine footballer

Personal information
- Full name: Tomás David Sandoval
- Date of birth: 30 March 1999 (age 27)
- Place of birth: Santa Fe, Argentina
- Height: 1.85 m (6 ft 1 in)
- Position: Forward

Team information
- Current team: Correcaminos
- Number: 32

Youth career
- 2009–2010: Argentinos Juniors
- 2010–2016: Colón

Senior career*
| Years | Team | Apps | (Gls) |
| 2016–2023 | Colón | 39 | (7) |
| 2021–2022 | → Platense (loan) | 17 | (1) |
| 2023 | → Quilmes (loan) | 24 | (4) |
| 2024–2025 | Atlético Grau | 30 | (4) |
| 2026– | Correcaminos | 0 | (0) |

International career
| 2017– | Argentina U20 | 1 | (1) |
- * Club domestic league appearances and goals as of 29 December 2025

Tomás David Sandoval (born 30 March 1999) is an Argentine professional footballer who plays as a forward for Liga de Expansión MX club Correcaminos.

== Early life ==
Sandoval was born in Santa Fe, Argentina on 30 March 1999.

== Career ==
=== Club ===
Sandoval spent a year with Argentinos Juniors in his youth, prior to joining Colón's system at age 11. He began his senior career with Colón in 2016. His debut for the club arrived on 29 April in a 3–1 Argentine Primera División win against Olimpo at the Estadio Brigadier General Estanislao López, he was substituted on for Nicolás Leguizamón on 74 minutes prior to scoring six minutes later to make it 2–0. After two more appearances in 2016, he scored one goal (versus Atlético de Rafaela) in ten matches in 2016–17.

On 24 August 2021, Sandoval joined Platense on a dry loan until July 2022. Sandoval played the second half of the 2022 season back at Colón, before joining Quilmes in January 2023 on a one-year loan.

=== International ===
Sandoval was selected for the Argentina U20s in July 2017. On 17 July, he scored in a 3–1 friendly victory versus Brown.

== Personal life ==
Tomás is the son of former footballer Gustavo Sandoval.

== Career statistics ==
As of 27 May 2018.

Club statistics
| Club | Season | League | | | Cup (Note: Includes the Copa Argentina) | | League Cup | | Continental (Note: Includes the Copa Sudamericana) | | Other | | Total | |
| Club | Season | Division | Apps | Goals | Apps | Goals | Apps | Goals | Apps | Goals | Apps | Goals | Apps | Goals |
|---|---|---|---|---|---|---|---|---|---|---|---|---|---|---|
| Colón | 2016 | Primera División | 3 | 1 | 0 | 0 | — | | — | | 0 | 0 | 3 | 1 |
| Colón | 2016–17 | Primera División | 10 | 1 | 0 | 0 | — | | — | | 0 | 0 | 10 | 1 |
| Colón | 2017–18 | Primera División | 4 | 1 | 1 | 0 | — | | 0 | 0 | 0 | 0 | 5 | 1 |
| Career total | | | 17 | 3 | 1 | 0 | — | | 0 | 0 | 0 | 0 | 18 | 3 |
