= Gustavo Sandoval =

Argentine footballer

Personal information
- Full name: Gustavo David Sandoval
- Date of birth: 12 March 1975 (age 51)
- Place of birth: Santa Fe, Argentina
- Height: 1.74 m (5 ft 9 in)
- Position: Forward

Senior career*
Years	Team	Apps	(Gls)
1996–1999	Colón	31	(6)
2000	Argentinos Juniors	8	(1)
2000	Unión Española	13	(3)
2001–2002	Jalapa		
2002–2003	Patronato	0	(0)
2003–2004	Aldosivi	20	(5)
2004–2005	Ben Hur	12	(6)
2005	Douglas Haig	12	(3)
2006	El Linqueño	8	(3)
2006–2008	Gimnasia y Esgrima	42	(8)
Total		146	(35)
- * Club domestic league appearances and goals

Gustavo David Sandoval (born 12 March 1975) is an Argentine former professional footballer who played as a forward.

== Career ==
Sandoval's career started with Colón of the Argentine Primera División, with whom he made his professional debut for in December 1996 in a 6–0 win over Banfield. Six goals in thirty further appearances followed for him with Colón. In 2000, Sandoval joined fellow top-flight team Argentinos Juniors and played eight times whilst scoring one goal. A few months after joining Argentinos, he departed to sign for Chilean Primera División side Unión Española. He remained with the club until the end of 2000 and scored three goals in thirteen matches. During 2001 and 2002, Sandoval played for Jalapa in Guatemala.

In 2002, Sandoval returned to Argentine football to play for Patronato. He failed to make an appearance for the first-team and left a year after signing to join Aldosivi. After five goals in twenty games for Aldosivi, Sandoval subsequently had spells with Ben Hur, Douglas Haig and El Linqueño between 2004 and 2006 and featured in a total of thirty-two matches and scored twelve goals. In 2006, Sandoval joined Gimnasia y Esgrima in Torneo Argentino B. He retired in 2008 after eight goals in forty-two fixtures for Gimnasia y Esgrima.

== Personal life ==
Gustavo is the father of footballer Tomás Sandoval.

== Honours ==
Ben Hur

- Torneo Argentino A: 2004–05
