= Santiago Chacón =

Argentine footballer

Personal information
- Date of birth: 30 May 1992 (age 34)
- Place of birth: Buenos Aires, Argentina
- Height: 1.76 m (5 ft 9 1/2 in)
- Position: Attacking midfielder

Team information
- Current team: Gravina

Senior career*
Years	Team	Apps	(Gls)
2011–2014	Huracán	8	(0)
2014–2015	Ermionida	26	(0)
2015–2016	Villa Teresa	20	(0)
2016–2018	San Martín SJ	2	(0)
2018	Santamarina	1	(0)
2020	Bangor City		
2020–2021	Sambenedettese	18	(0)
2021–2023	Gravina	47	(7)
2023–2024	Bitonto	21	(1)
2024–	Gravina	10	(1)
- * Club domestic league appearances and goals as of 17 November 2024

Santiago Chacón (born 30 May 1992) is an Argentine professional footballer who plays as an attacking midfielder for Italian Serie D side Gravina.

== Career ==
Huracán gave Chacón his professional debut in Primera B Nacional on 12 May 2012 versus Patronato, having previously selected him as a substitute for two games in the past season's Argentine Primera División. He remained with Huracán for three seasons and made a total of eight appearances. On 11 September 2014, Chacón joined Ermionida of the Greek Football League. Twenty-eight appearances, the last of which came against Episkopi on 14 June, followed during 2014–15 as Ermionida were relegated. August 2015 saw Chacón sign for Uruguay's Villa Teresa. His first appearance was against El Tanque Sisley on 19 September.

Like with Ermionida, the one campaign spent with Villa Teresa, the 2015–16 Uruguayan Primera División season, ended with relegation. On 30 June 2016, Chacón joined Argentine Primera División side San Martín. Two years later, following just three matches for San Martín, Chacón agreed to join Santamarina of Primera B Nacional. He appeared just once for the club, featuring for the final thirty minutes of a goalless draw with Arsenal de Sarandí on 1 September 2018. He left at the end of the year. In January 2020, Chacón joined Welsh Cymru North club Bangor City. He netted goals against Corwen and Conwy Borough.

On 24 July 2020, Chacón signed a two-year contract with Sambenedettese of Italy's Serie C. His first appearance came in a Coppa Italia first round loss to Alessandria on 23 September.

On 16 September 2021, he moved to FBC Gravina in Serie D. He left the club at the end of the 2022–23 season. In November 2023, Chacón signed with fellow league club Bitonto.

== Career statistics ==
As of 22 December 2020.

Club statistics
Club	Season	League			Cup		League Cup		Continental		Other		Total	
Club	Season	Division	Apps	Goals	Apps	Goals	Apps	Goals	Apps	Goals	Apps	Goals	Apps	Goals
Huracán	2010–11	Argentine Primera División	0	0	0	0	—		—		0	0	0	0
Huracán	2011–12	Primera B Nacional	3	0	0	0	—		—		0	0	3	0
Huracán	2012–13	Primera B Nacional	5	0	0	0	—		—		0	0	5	0
Huracán	Total		8	0	0	0	—		—		0	0	8	0
Ermionida	2014–15	Football League	26	0	2	0	—		—		0	0	28	0
Villa Teresa	2015–16	Uruguayan Primera División	20	0	0	0	—		—		0	0	20	0
San Martín	2016–17	Argentine Primera División	2	0	1	0	—		—		0	0	3	0
San Martín	2017–18	Argentine Primera División	0	0	0	0	—		—		0	0	0	0
San Martín	Total		2	0	1	0	—		—		0	0	3	0
Santamarina	2018–19	Primera B Nacional	1	0	0	0	—		—		0	0	1	0
Sambenedettese	2020–21	Serie C	3	0	1	0	—		—		0	0	4	0
Career total			60	0	4	0	—		—		0	0	64	1
