= Gonzalo Marinelli =

Argentine footballer (born 1989)

Personal information
- Full name: Gonzalo Marinelli
- Date of birth: 7 February 1989 (age 37)
- Place of birth: José C. Paz, Argentina
- Height: 1.78 m (5 ft 10 in)
- Position: Goalkeeper

Team information
- Current team: Quilmes
- Number: 1

Youth career
- River Plate

Senior career*
Years	Team	Apps	(Gls)
2011–2014	River Plate	0	(0)
2013–2014	→ Atlético de Rafaela (loan)	2	(0)
2014–2017	Huracán	4	(0)
2017–2018	Colón	0	(0)
2018–2024	Tigre	105	(0)
2024–2026	Independiente Rivadavia	17	(0)
2026–	Quilmes	3	(0)
- * Club domestic league appearances and goals as of 17:51, 16 March 2026 (UTC)

Gonzalo Marinelli (born 7 February 1989) is an Argentine professional footballer who plays as a goalkeeper for Quilmes.

== Career ==
Marinelli began with River Plate in 2011 in Primera B Nacional. He first appeared for the first-team in August by being an unused substitute for league matches against Chacarita Juniors, Independiente Rivadavia and Sportivo Desamparados, along with four further league fixtures during 2011–12 which ended with promotion to the Argentine Primera División. He was an unused sub twice more during 2012–13, prior to leaving the club on loan in July 2013 to join fellow Primera División team Atlético de Rafaela. He made his professional debut for Rafaela on 13 April 2014, it came in a 2–0 defeat to his parent club.

He played once more for Rafaela, versus Rosario Central on 16 April, before returning to River Plate and subsequently joining Huracán permanently. He made just six appearances in four seasons for Huracán in all competitions. On 7 July 2017, Marinelli completed a move to Colón. His debut for Colón arrived in the Copa Argentina against former club Huracán on 1 September. Tigre signed Marinelli in July 2018.

== Career statistics ==
As of 10 September 2018.

Club statistics
Club	Season	League			Cup (Note: Includes the Copa Argentina)		League Cup		Continental (Note: Includes the Copa Libertadores and Copa Sudamericana)		Other		Total	
Club	Season	Division	Apps	Goals	Apps	Goals	Apps	Goals	Apps	Goals	Apps	Goals	Apps	Goals
River Plate	2011–12	Primera B Nacional	0	0	0	0	—		—		0	0	0	0
River Plate	2012–13	Primera División	0	0	0	0	—		—		0	0	0	0
River Plate	2013–14	Primera División	0	0	0	0	—		0	0	0	0	0	0
River Plate	Total		0	0	0	0	—		0	0	0	0	0	0
Atlético de Rafaela (loan)	2013–14	Primera División	2	0	0	0	—		—		0	0	2	0
Huracán	2014	Primera B Nacional	2	0	0	0	—		0	0	0	0	2	0
Huracán	2015	Primera División	1	0	0	0	—		0	0	0	0	1	0
Huracán	2016	Primera División	0	0	0	0	—		1 (Note: One appearance in 2016 Copa Libertadores)	0	0	0	0	0
Huracán	2016–17	Primera División	1	0	0	0	—		1 (Note: One appearance in 2017 Copa Sudamericana)	0	0	0	2	0
Huracán	Total		4	0	0	0	—		2	0	0	0	6	0
Colón	2017–18	Primera División	0	0	1	0	—		0	0	0	0	1	0
Tigre	2018–19	Primera División	2	0	0	0	—		0	0	0	0	2	0
Career total			8	0	1	0	—		2	0	0	0	11	0

== Honours ==
River Plate

- Primera B Nacional: 2011–12

Huracán

- Copa Argentina: 2013–14

Independiente Rivadavia

- Copa Argentina: 2025
