= Neri Bandiera =

Argentine professional footballer

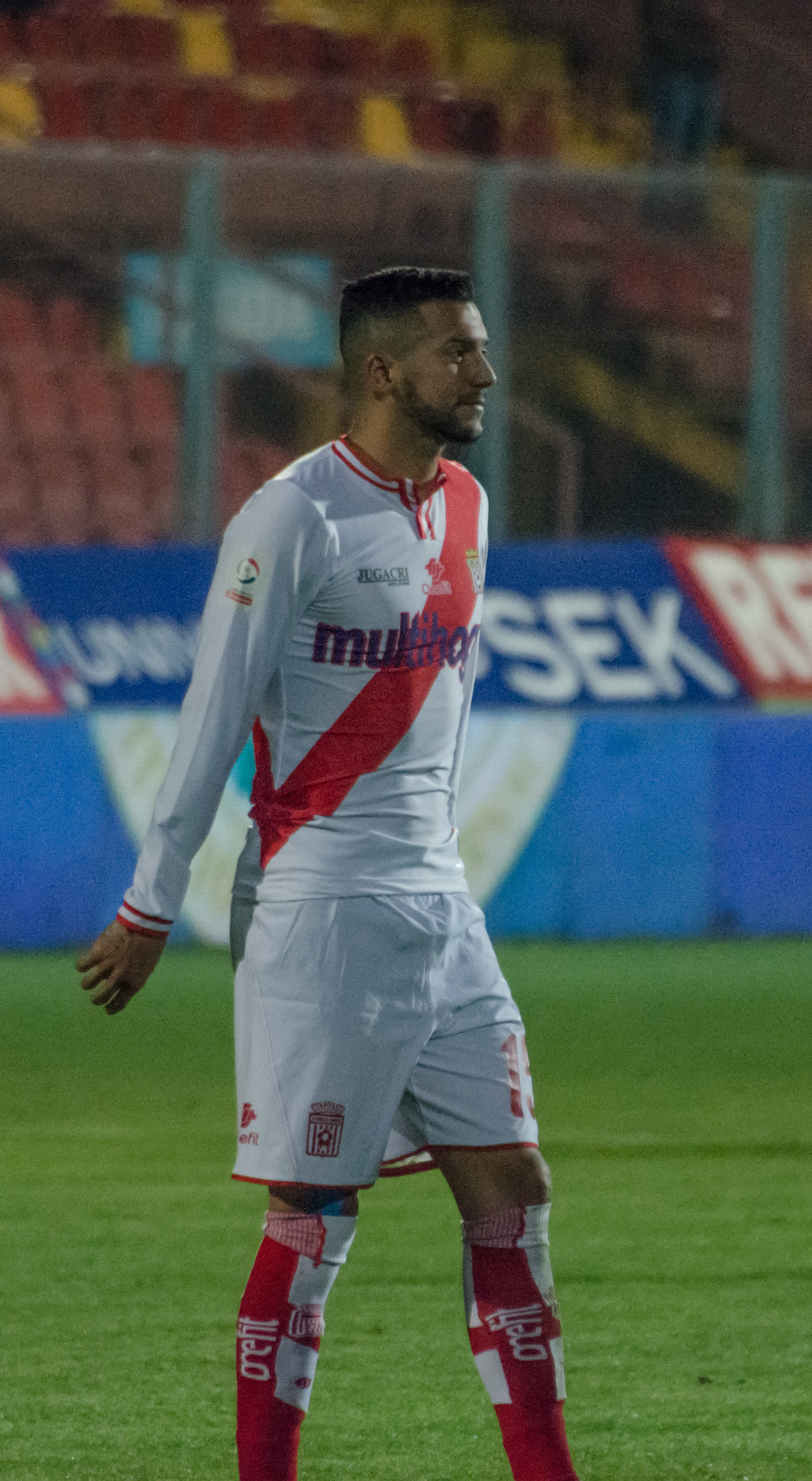
- Bandiera in 2018.

Personal information
- Full name: Neri Ricardo Bandiera
- Date of birth: 3 July 1989 (age 37)
- Place of birth: Rosario, Argentina
- Height: 1.72 m (5 ft 8 in)
- Position: Winger

Team information
- Current team: Cienciano
- Number: 11

Senior career*
Years	Team	Apps	(Gls)
2008	ADIUR		
2009	Tiro Federal		
2010–2013	Renato Cesarini		
2013	Sarmiento		
2013–2016	Juventud Unida	79	(13)
2016–2017	Aldosivi	35	(6)
2017–2018	Belgrano	4	(0)
2018	Curicó Unido	8	(2)
2019	Juventud Unida	13	(3)
2020	Estudiantes BA	16	(8)
2021	Patronato	12	(0)
2022	Barracas Central	40	(9)
2023-2025	Atlético Grau	99	(38)
2026-	Cienciano	12	(5)
- * Club domestic league appearances and goals as of 29 December 2025

Neri Ricardo Bandiera (born 3 July 1989) is an Argentine professional footballer who plays as a winger for Cienciano.

== Career ==
Bandiera's career started with ADIUR in 2008; in 2009 he departed to join Primera B Nacional side Tiro Federal but was released soon after. Following his release from Tiro Federal, he joined Renato Cesarini, a club founded in honour of Renato Cesarini. His stay with the team lasted three years until he left to join Torneo Argentino B side Sarmiento in early 2013, however his stay in Resistencia was short as he left soon after. He signed for Torneo Argentino A's Juventud Unida on 3 August 2013. His debut came on 18 August in an away win against Chaco For Ever.

It took him thirteen league matches until he scored his first goal for the club; it came on 9 March 2014 in a draw versus Libertad. Two more goals followed in 2013–14 before he participated in fourteen games and scored four times in the 2014 Torneo Federal A, a division Juventud Unida moved into at the start of 2014, as he and Juventud won promotion into the 2015 Primera B Nacional after winning Zone 4 in the 2014 Torneo Federal A. He played in forty of the club's forty-two league fixtures in 2015 and scored six goals. In 2016, Bandiera joined Argentine Primera División club Aldosivi.

He went on to make thirty-seven appearances and score six goals in all competitions for Aldosivi in a season that ended with relegation. On 4 July 2017, Bandiera joined Primera División team Belgrano. He made his Belgrano debut on 25 August versus Banfield. Bandiera was signed by Curicó Unido of the Chilean Primera División.

== Career statistics ==
As of 7 September 2018.

Club statistics
Club	Season	League			Cup (Note: Includes the Copa Argentina)		League Cup		Continental (Note: Includes the Copa Libertadores)		Other		Total	
Club	Season	Division	Apps	Goals	Apps	Goals	Apps	Goals	Apps	Goals	Apps	Goals	Apps	Goals
Juventud Unida	2013–14	Torneo Argentino A	25	3	1	0	—		—		0	0	26	3
Juventud Unida	2014	Torneo Federal A	14	4	0	0	—		—		0	0	14	4
Juventud Unida	2015	Primera B Nacional	40	6	0	0	—		—		0	0	40	6
Juventud Unida	Total		79	13	1	0	—		—		0	0	80	13
Aldosivi	2016	Argentine Primera División	12	4	1	0	—		—		0	0	13	4
Aldosivi	2016–17	Argentine Primera División	23	2	1	0	—		—		0	0	24	2
Aldosivi	Total		35	6	2	0	—		—		0	0	37	6
Belgrano	2017–18	Argentine Primera División	4	0	0	0	—		—		0	0	4	0
Curicó Unido	2018	Chilean Primera División	8	2	0	0	—		—		0	0	8	2
Career total			126	21	3	0	—		—		0	0	129	21
