= Lucas Acosta (footballer, born 1995) =

Argentine professional footballer

Personal information
- Full name: Lucas Mauricio Acosta
- Date of birth: 12 March 1995 (age 31)
- Place of birth: Córdoba, Argentina
- Height: 1.87 m (6 ft 1 1/2 in)
- Position: Goalkeeper

Team information
- Current team: Aldosivi
- Number: 42

Youth career
- Belgrano

Senior career*
Years	Team	Apps	(Gls)
2013–2020	Belgrano	43	(0)
2020–2026	Lanús	55	(0)
2022	→ Sarmiento (loan)	4	(0)
2024–2025	→ Sarmiento (loan)	55	(0)
2026–	Aldosivi	11	(0)
- * Club domestic league appearances and goals as of 17:54, 6 November 2026 (UTC)

Lucas Mauricio Acosta (born 12 March 1995) is an Argentine professional footballer who plays as a goalkeeper for Aldosivi.

== Career ==
Acosta started his career in 2013 with Primera División side Belgrano. He appeared on the bench for twelve games in two seasons, prior to making his professional debut in the Copa Sudamericana on 18 September against Lanús; an encounter Belgrano lost 5–1. He made his next appearance and league bow on 11 March 2017, a day before his 22nd birthday, in a defeat to San Lorenzo. Acosta had been selected forty-seven times by the end of 2017–18, though the goalkeeper didn't feature across 2018–19. In August 2019, Belgrano revealed a contractual dispute was ongoing with Acosta; as a deal with Colón was agreed, but Acosta rejected the move.

In July 2020, after continued issues with Belgrano that stopped him being selected, Acosta departed to Lanús following the expiration of his contract. On 27 January 2022, Acosta was loaned out to fellow league club Sarmiento until the end of the year. In a game against Unión de Santa Fe on 27 February 2022, Acosta suffered an anterior cruciate ligament injury, which was expected to keep him sidelines for 6–8 months.

== Career statistics ==
As of 29 September 2020.

Club statistics
Club	Season	League			Cup		League Cup		Continental		Other		Total	
Club	Season	Division	Apps	Goals	Apps	Goals	Apps	Goals	Apps	Goals	Apps	Goals	Apps	Goals
Belgrano	2013–14	Primera División	0	0	0	0	—		0	0	0	0	0	0
Belgrano	2014	Primera División	0	0	0	0	—		—		0	0	0	0
Belgrano	2015	Primera División	0	0	0	0	—		1 (Note: Appearance(s) in the Copa Sudamericana)	0	0	0	1	0
Belgrano	2016	Primera División	0	0	0	0	—		—		0	0	0	0
Belgrano	2016–17	Primera División	16	0	1	0	—		0	0	0	0	17	0
Belgrano	2017–18	Primera División	27	0	2	0	—		—		0	0	29	0
Belgrano	2018–19	Primera División	0	0	0	0	0	0	—		0	0	0	0
Belgrano	2019–20	Primera B Nacional	0	0	0	0	—		—		0	0	0	0
Belgrano	Total		43	0	3	0	0	0	1	0	0	0	47	0
Lanús	2020–21	Primera División	0	0	0	0	0	0	—		0	0	0	0
Career total			43	0	3	0	0	0	1	0	0	0	47	0
