= Lucas Salas =

Argentine footballer

Personal information
- Full name: Lucas Ezequiel Salas
- Date of birth: 28 September 1994 (age 32)
- Place of birth: San Juan, Argentina
- Height: 1.72 m (5 ft 7 1/2 in)
- Position: Midfielder

Youth career
- San Martín SJ
- Alianza
- San Martín SJ

Senior career*
Years	Team	Apps	(Gls)
2011–2018	San Martín SJ	53	(1)
2018–2019	Asteras Tripolis	0	(0)
2019–2020	Olimpo	15	(0)
2020–2021	San Martín SJ	1	(0)
2021	Sportivo Desamparados	4	(1)

International career
2012	Argentina U20	1	(0)
- * Club domestic league appearances and goals as of 20:04, 7 August 2022 (UTC)

Lucas Ezequiel Salas (born 28 September 1994) is an Argentine professional footballer who plays as a midfielder.

== Career ==
=== Club ===
Salas played for the San Martín youth team either side of a spell with Alianza. He began his senior career with San Martín, with his debut arriving during a Copa Argentina match with Sarmiento in November 2011. Salas' first appearance in professional league football came on 11 August 2012, he featured for the final thirty-three minutes of a home defeat to Colón. In his opening two campaigns with the club, Salas made five appearances in all competitions. In his third season, he was selected for thirty-one fixtures; netting his first goal in the process, in a 1–1 draw with Villa San Carlos on 8 September 2013.

After not featuring in the Argentine Primera División during 2016–17 or 2017–18, Salas terminated his contract with the club in May 2018. Two months later, he completed a move to Greek football by joining Asteras Tripolis.

=== International ===
In 2012, Salas was selected as part of Julio Olarticoechea's squad for a Four Nations Tournament in Chile. He won one cap, against Mexico on 9 October.

== Career statistics ==
As of 6 July 2018.

Club statistics
Club	Season	League			Cup (Note: Includes the Copa Argentina and Greek Football Cup)		League Cup		Continental (Note: Includes the UEFA Europa League)		Other		Total	
Club	Season	Division	Apps	Goals	Apps	Goals	Apps	Goals	Apps	Goals	Apps	Goals	Apps	Goals
San Martín	2011–12	Primera División	0	0	1	0	—		—		0	0	1	0
San Martín	2012–13	Primera División	3	0	1	0	—		—		0	0	4	0
San Martín	2013–14	Primera B Nacional	30	1	1	1	—		—		0	0	31	2
San Martín	2014	Primera B Nacional	6	0	0	0	—		—		0	0	6	0
San Martín	2015	Primera División	0	0	0	0	—		—		0	0	0	0
San Martín	2016	Primera División	14	0	1	0	—		—		0	0	15	0
San Martín	2016–17	Primera División	0	0	1	0	—		—		0	0	1	0
San Martín	2017–18	Primera División	0	0	0	0	—		—		0	0	0	0
San Martín	Total		53	1	5	1	—		—		0	0	58	2
Asteras Tripolis	2018–19	Super League Greece	0	0	0	0	—		0	0	0	0	0	0
Career total			53	1	5	1	—		0	0	0	0	58	2
