= Matías Villarreal =

Argentine professional footballer

Personal information
- Full name: Matías Raúl Villarreal
- Date of birth: 16 January 1992 (age 34)
- Place of birth: Godoy Cruz, Argentina
- Height: 1.79 m (5 ft 10 in)
- Position: Midfielder

Team information
- Current team: Central Norte

Youth career
- Luján de Cuyo
- Deportivo Guaymallén
- 2006–2011: Independiente Rivadavia

Senior career*
Years	Team	Apps	(Gls)
2011–2017	Independiente Rivadavia	65	(1)
2017–2020	Estudiantes	81	(3)
2020–2021	Aldosivi	10	(0)
2021–2022	→ Quilmes (loan)	15	(0)
2022–2023	Gimnasia Mendoza	38	(0)
2023	Resistencia	17	(0)
2023–2024	Deportivo Madryn	17	(0)
2024–2025	Agropecuario	33	(0)
2025–2026	Deportivo Maipú	28	(0)
2026–	Central Norte	6	(0)
- * Club domestic league appearances and goals as of 17:27, 24 April 2026 (UTC)

Matías Raúl Villarreal (born 16 January 1992) is an Argentine professional footballer who plays as a midfielder for Central Norte.

== Club career ==
Villarreal initially played in the youth system of Luján de Cuyo, prior to spending two years in the ranks of Deportivo Guaymallén. 2006 saw Villarreal head to Independiente Rivadavia, appearing exclusively for their youth sides up until 2011. His senior debut arrived in Primera B Nacional on 7 May 2011 against CAI, with the central midfielder starting an eventual goalless home draw; though would be substituted off at the interval. He had previously been on the bench versus San Martín a month prior. Ten appearances later, Villarreal scored in a win over All Boys on 15 November 2014; a ninetieth minute winner.

After sixty-nine matches for Independiente Rivadavia, Villarreal switched Primera B Nacional for Primera B Metropolitana after agreeing a move to Estudiantes in August 2017. His first appearance came in a scoreless draw with UAI Urquiza on 3 September, while his opening goal came almost two years later against Sacachispas on 18 May 2019; in a campaign that concluded with promotion to the second tier. Two further goals followed, in a victory over Mitre in February 2020, across twenty-three games in 2019–20. July 2020 saw Villarreal join Primera División side Aldosivi under manager Guillermo Hoyos.

Villarreal's top-flight debut occurred on 31 October 2020 in the Copa de la Liga Profesional against La Plata's Estudiantes; in a match that finished without any goals, just like his previous two club debuts did. To gain some more playing time, Villarreal was loaned out to Quilmes in July 2021 for the rest of 2022. However, the spell was cut short and he returned at the end of 2021.

In January 2022, Villarreal moved to Gimnasia Mendoza. A year later, in January 2023, he signed with Paraguayan side Resistencia. Six months later, he returned to Argentina, joining Deportivo Madryn.

== International career ==
In February 2008, Villarreal received a call-up to train with the Argentina U17s.

== Career statistics ==
As of 3 December 2020.

Appearances and goals by club, season and competition
Club	Season	League			Cup		League Cup		Continental		Other		Total	
Club	Season	Division	Apps	Goals	Apps	Goals	Apps	Goals	Apps	Goals	Apps	Goals	Apps	Goals
Independiente Rivadavia	2010–11	Primera B Nacional	1	0	0	0	—		—		0	0	1	0
Independiente Rivadavia	2011–12	Primera B Nacional	0	0	0	0	—		—		0	0	0	0
Independiente Rivadavia	2012–13	Primera B Nacional	0	0	0	0	—		—		0	0	0	0
Independiente Rivadavia	2013–14	Primera B Nacional	8	0	1	0	—		—		0	0	9	0
Independiente Rivadavia	2014	Primera B Nacional	4	1	0	0	—		—		0	0	4	1
Independiente Rivadavia	2015	Primera B Nacional	24	0	2	0	—		—		0	0	26	0
Independiente Rivadavia	2016	Primera B Nacional	14	0	0	0	—		—		0	0	14	0
Independiente Rivadavia	2016–17	Primera B Nacional	14	0	1	0	—		—		0	0	15	0
Independiente Rivadavia	Total		65	1	4	0	—		—		0	0	69	1
Estudiantes	2017–18	Primera B Metropolitana	27	0	0	0	—		—		0	0	27	0
Estudiantes	2018–19	Primera B Metropolitana	35	1	2	0	—		—		0	0	37	1
Estudiantes	2019–20	Primera B Nacional	19	2	4	0	—		—		0	0	23	2
Estudiantes	Total		81	3	6	0	—		—		0	0	87	3
Aldosivi	2020–21 (Note: Soccerway counts Copa de la Liga Profesional appearances as league appearances.)	Primera División	3	0	0	0	0	0	—		0	0	3	0
Career total			149	4	10	0	0	0	—		0	0	159	4
