= Mariano Barbieri =

Argentine footballer (born 1990)

Personal information
- Full name: Mariano Omar Barbieri
- Date of birth: 29 November 1990 (age 35)
- Place of birth: Chivilcoy, Argentina
- Height: 1.63 m (5 ft 4 in)
- Position: Winger

Team information
- Current team: Belgrano

Senior career*
Years	Team	Apps	(Gls)
2008–2013	Flandria	139	(11)
2013–2016	Deportivo Morón	37	(4)
2014–2015	→ Defensa y Justicia (loan)	34	(2)
2016	→ Arsenal de Sarandí (loan)	13	(3)
2016	Arsenal de Sarandí	0	(0)
2016–	Belgrano	31	(3)
2018	→ Unión La Calera (loan)	26	(6)
2019	→ Deportes Iquique (loan)	11	(0)
2020	→ San Luis (loan)	8	(3)
- * Club domestic league appearances and goals as of 20 December 2020

Mariano Omar Barbieri (born 29 November 1990) is an Argentine professional footballer who plays as a winger for Belgrano.

== Career ==
Barbieri's career began in 2008 with Flandria. He made one hundred and thirty-nine appearances for the club and scored eleven times. After five years with Flandria, Barbieri joined Primera B Metropolitana club Deportivo Morón. He scored four goals in thirty-seven games prior to leaving to sign for Argentine Primera División team Defensa y Justicia on loan in July 2014. 2016 saw Barbieri join fellow Primera División side Arsenal de Sarandí on loan. For Arsenal, Barbieri played thirteen matches and scored three goals prior to joining on a permanent basis. His stay was short as he was immediately sold to Belgrano.

He made his debut in a goalless draw against Olimpo on 18 September 2016, before going on to score three goals in thirty-one appearances over two seasons for Belgrano. In February 2018, Barbieri joined Chilean Primera División side Unión La Calera on loan. He scored two goals during a 1–3 away victory versus Everton on 7 April. Barbieri departed Belgrano permanently in January 2019, deciding to remain in Chile with Deportes Iquique.

== Career statistics ==
As of 16 January 2019.

Club statistics
Club	Season	League			Cup		Continental		Other		Total	
Club	Season	Division	Apps	Goals	Apps	Goals	Apps	Goals	Apps	Goals	Apps	Goals
Belgrano	2016–17	Argentine Primera División	23	3	4	0	3 (Note: Appearance(s) in the Copa Sudamericana)	0	0	0	30	3
Belgrano	2017–18	Argentine Primera División	8	0	2	0	—		0	0	10	0
Belgrano	2018–19	Argentine Primera División	0	0	0	0	—		0	0	0	0
Belgrano	Total		31	3	6	0	3	0	0	0	40	3
Unión La Calera (loan)	2018	Chilean Primera División	26	6	4	1	—		0	0	30	7
Deportes Iquique	2019	Chilean Primera División	0	0	0	0	—		0	0	0	0
Career total			57	9	10	1	3	0	0	0	70	10
