= Epifanio García =

Paraguayan footballer (born 1992)

Personal information
- Full name: Epifanio Ariel García Duarte
- Date of birth: 2 July 1992 (age 34)
- Place of birth: San Miguel, Paraguay
- Height: 1.78 m (5 ft 10 in)
- Position: Forward

Team information
- Current team: River Plate
- Number: 19

Youth career
- Cerro Porteño

Senior career*
Years	Team	Apps	(Gls)
2011–2015	Cerro Porteño	8	(0)
2015–2019	Guaraní	48	(12)
2016	→ Fulgencio Yegros (loan)	36	(8)
2017–2018	→ Belgrano (loan)	15	(4)
2020–	River Plate	10	(1)

International career
2009	Paraguay U17	4	(0)
- * Club domestic league appearances and goals as of 10:19, 20 December 2020 (UTC)

Epifanio Ariel García Duarte (born 2 July 1992) is a Paraguayan professional footballer who plays as a forward for River Plate.

== Career ==
=== Club ===
García started his senior footballing career in Paraguay with Cerro Porteño, with whom he made his professional debut with in June 2011 against Nacional in the Paraguayan Primera División. Two further appearances followed in 2012 and 2013 for García, before he played five times during 2014. He left in 2015 following eight appearances, none of which were starts. García signed for fellow Paraguayan top-flight club Guaraní in June 2015. Before featuring for Guaraní, García had a loan spell with Paraguayan División Intermedia side Fulgencio Yegros where he scored eight goals in thirty-six games.

He eventually made his Guaraní debut on 16 October 2016, over a year after joining, in a league match with River Plate, he scored his first career goal in the process during a 1–2 win. In total, he went onto score three goals, including one versus former club Cerro Porteño, in eight games throughout 2016. He scored three goals in seven 2017 Copa Libertadores matches for Guaraní. On 23 July 2017, García joined Argentine Primera División side Belgrano on loan.

=== International ===
García played four times for the Paraguay U17s in 2009.

== Career statistics ==
As of 6 August 2018.

Club statistics
Club	Season	League			Cup (Note: Includes the Copa Argentina and Copa Paraguay)		League Cup		Continental (Note: Includes the Copa Libertadores and Copa Sudamericana)		Other		Total	
Club	Season	Division	Apps	Goals	Apps	Goals	Apps	Goals	Apps	Goals	Apps	Goals	Apps	Goals
Cerro Porteño	2011	Paraguayan Primera División	1	0	—		—		0	0	0	0	1	0
Cerro Porteño	2012	Paraguayan Primera División	1	0	—		—		0	0	0	0	1	0
Cerro Porteño	2013	Paraguayan Primera División	1	0	—		—		0	0	0	0	1	0
Cerro Porteño	2014	Paraguayan Primera División	5	0	—		—		2 (Note: One appearance in 2014 Copa Libertadores, one appearance in 2014 Copa Sudamericana)	0	0	0	7	0
Cerro Porteño	2015	Paraguayan Primera División	0	0	—		—		0	0	0	0	0	0
Cerro Porteño	Total		8	0	—		—		2	0	0	0	10	0
Guaraní	2015	Paraguayan Primera División	0	0	—		—		0	0	0	0	0	0
Guaraní	2016	Paraguayan Primera División	8	3	—		—		0	0	0	0	8	3
Guaraní	2017	Paraguayan Primera División	14	2	—		—		7 (Note: Seven appearances in 2017 Copa Libertadores)	3 (Note: Three goals in 2017 Copa Libertadores)	0	0	21	5
Guaraní	2018	Paraguayan Primera División	2	0	0	0	—		0	0	0	0	2	0
Guaraní	Total		24	5	—		—		7	3	0	0	31	8
Fulgencio Yegros (loan)	2016	Paraguayan División Intermedia	36	8	—		—		—		0	0	36	8
Belgrano (loan)	2017–18	Argentine Primera División	15	4	2	0	—		—		0	0	17	4
Career total			83	17	2	0	—		9	3	0	0	94	20

== Honours ==
Cerro Porteño

- Paraguayan Primera División (2): 2012 Apertura, 2013 Clausura

Guaraní

- Paraguayan Primera División: 2016 Clausura
