= Osvaldo Arroyo =

Argentine footballer

Personal information
- Full name: Osvaldo Gabriel Arroyo
- Date of birth: 27 February 1995 (age 31)
- Place of birth: Vera, Argentina
- Height: 1.73 m (5 ft 8 in)
- Position: Left-back

Team information
- Current team: Sportivo Belgrano

Senior career*
Years	Team	Apps	(Gls)
2015–2017	Colón	6	(0)
2018–2019	Cianorte	4	(0)
2018–2019	→ Vitória (loan)	0	(0)
2020	CA San Jorge		
2020	9 de Julio		
2021–	Sportivo Belgrano	0	(0)
- * Club domestic league appearances and goals as of 17:21, 7 February 2021 (UTC)

Osvaldo Gabriel Arroyo (born 27 February 1995) is an Argentine footballer who plays as a left-back for Sportivo Belgrano.

== Career ==
Arroyo's first senior career club were Argentine Primera División team Colón. His debut came in the league on 12 July 2015 in a 0–0 draw with Nueva Chicago. Four more appearances arrived in 2015, prior to zero in 2016 and one in 2016–17 before leaving Colón in July 2017. Ahead of 2018, Arroyo joined Campeonato Brasileiro Série D side Cianorte; becoming the club's first foreign player. After nine appearances in alternative competition, Arroyo made his Série D bow on 14 May versus Novo Hamburgo. In July, he was loaned by Campeonato Brasileiro Série A's Vitória. He returned to his parent team in April 2019 after three games.

In January 2020, Arroyo headed to the Torneo Regional Federal Amateur with Club Atlético San Jorge. Midway through the year, in October, Arroyo signed for divisional rivals 9 de Julio. In February 2021, Torneo Federal A's Sportivo Belgrano became Arroyo's sixth senior club.

== Career statistics ==
As of 7 February 2021.

Club statistics
Club	Season	League			Cup		Continental		Other		Total	
Club	Season	Division	Apps	Goals	Apps	Goals	Apps	Goals	Apps	Goals	Apps	Goals
Colón	2015	Primera División	5	0	0	0	—		0	0	5	0
Colón	2016	Primera División	0	0	0	0	—		0	0	0	0
Colón	2016–17	Primera División	1	0	0	0	—		0	0	1	0
Colón	Total		6	0	0	0	—		0	0	6	0
Cianorte	2018	Série D	2	0	3	0	—		6 (Note: Appearance(s) in the Campeonato Paranaense)	0	11	0
Cianorte	2019	Série D	2	0	0	0	—		0	0	2	0
Cianorte	Total		4	0	3	0	—		6	0	13	0
Vitória (loan)	2018	Série A	0	0	0	0	—		0	0	0	0
Vitória (loan)	2019	Série B	0	0	0	0	—		3 (Note: Appearance(s) in the Campeonato Baiano)	0	3	0
Vitória (loan)	Total		0	0	0	0	—		3	0	3	0
Sportivo Belgrano	2021	Torneo Federal A	0	0	0	0	—		0	0	0	0
Career total			10	0	3	0	—		9	0	22	0
