= Leonardo Corti =

Argentine footballer

Personal information
- Date of birth: 29 January 1981 (age 45)
- Place of birth: San Pedro, Argentina
- Height: 1.80 m (5 ft 11 in)
- Position: Goalkeeper

Team information
- Current team: Sportivo Peñarol

Youth career
- Almagro

Senior career*
| Years | Team | Apps | (Gls) |
| 2004–2006 | Almagro | 0 | (0) |
| 2006–2007 | Luján de Cuyo | 14 | (0) |
| 2007–2008 | Ben Hur | 0 | (0) |
| 2008–2019 | 9 de Julio | 35 | (0) |
| 2009–2021 | San Martín SJ | 30 | (0) |
| 2022– | Sportivo Peñarol | 19 | (0) |
- * Club domestic league appearances and goals as of 17:28, 26 July 2022 (UTC)

Leonardo Corti (born 29 January 1981) is an Argentine footballer who plays for Sportivo Peñarol as a goalkeeper.
