= Leandro Fernández (footballer, born 1995) =

Argentine footballer

Personal information
- Full name: Leandro David Fernández
- Date of birth: 23 January 1995 (age 31)
- Place of birth: Almafuerte, Argentina
- Height: 1.81 m (5 ft 11 in)
- Position: Forward

Team information
- Current team: Villa Mitre

Youth career
- Sportivo Belgrano de Almafuerte
- Atlético Ascasubi
- Belgrano

Senior career*
Years	Team	Apps	(Gls)
2016–2018	Belgrano	2	(0)
2017	→ Crucero del Norte (loan)	21	(3)
2017–2018	→ Guillermo Brown (loan)	14	(0)
2019–2020	C.A.Las Palmas (Note: Multiple sources, including Soccerway and BDFA, claim Fernández played for Sportivo Las Parejas in 2018 and 2019. This isn't the case, they are confusing him with a player called Santiago Fernández. Soccerway claim L. Fernández came on as a substitute against Unión Sunchales on 7 December 2019. However, ascensodelinterior.com confirm it was S. Fernández that was subbed on. It is possible that the sources are also mixing L. Fernández up with Sportivo's manager, who is also named Leandro Fernández. After signing for Racing de Córdoba in August 2020, L. Fernández talks in short about his career so far to ultimajugada.com - he does not mention Sportivo Las Parajas, but does mention his other four clubs.)	14	(6)
2020–2026	Racing de Córdoba	160	(12)
2026–	Villa Mitre	0	(0)
- * Club domestic league appearances and goals as of 14:31, 8 March 2026 (UTC)

Leandro David Fernández (born 23 January 1995) is an Argentine professional footballer who plays as a forward for Torneo Federal A club Villa Mitre.

== Career ==
Fernández started his career with Sportivo Belgrano de Almafuerte and Atlético Ascasubi, before heading to Belgrano of the Primera División; making his senior debut on 18 September 2016 in a match with Olimpo. He made one more appearance, versus Unión Santa Fe, before joining Primera B Nacional side Crucero del Norte on loan. His first appearance came on 11 March against Estudiantes, five matches later he scored his first goal in a defeat to Instituto. He scored three times in twenty-one fixtures as Crucero were relegated. Fernández joined Guillermo Brown on loan on 10 September 2017.

Fernández made his Guillermo Brown debut seven days after signing against Instituto on 17 September. He'd appear a total of fourteen times for them. In 2019, Fernández moved to Las Palmas of Torneo Regional Federal Amateur. Six goals followed across fourteen appearances in two seasons there. In August 2020, Fernández moved to fellow fourth tier team Racing de Córdoba.

== Career statistics ==
As of 27 September 2020.

Club statistics
Club	Season	League			Cup		League Cup		Continental		Other		Total	
Club	Season	Division	Apps	Goals	Apps	Goals	Apps	Goals	Apps	Goals	Apps	Goals	Apps	Goals
Belgrano	2016–17	Primera División	2	0	0	0	—		0	0	0	0	2	0
Belgrano	2017–18	Primera División	0	0	0	0	—		—		0	0	0	0
Belgrano	Total		2	0	0	0	—		0	0	0	0	2	0
Crucero del Norte (loan)	2016–17	Primera B Nacional	21	3	—		—		—		0	0	21	3
Guillermo Brown (loan)	2017–18	Primera B Nacional	14	0	0	0	—		—		0	0	14	0
Racing de Córdoba	2020	Torneo Amateur	0	0	0	0	—		—		0	0	0	0
Career total			37	3	0	0	—		0	0	0	0	37	3
