= Gonzalo Prósperi =

Argentine footballer

Personal information
- Full name: Gonzalo Sebastián Prósperi
- Date of birth: 3 June 1985 (age 41)
- Place of birth: Buenos Aires, Argentina
- Height: 1.79 m (5 ft 10 in)
- Position: Right-back

Youth career
- 2002–2005: Argentinos Juniors

Senior career*
Years	Team	Apps	(Gls)
2005–2006	Godoy Cruz	16	(2)
2006–2012	Argentinos Juniors	153	(4)
2012–2017	San Lorenzo	56	(0)
2016–2017	→ Banfield (loan)	8	(0)
2017–2021	San Martín SJ	70	(0)
- * Club domestic league appearances and goals

Gonzalo Sebastián Prósperi (born 3 June 1985) is a retired Argentine professional footballer who plays as a right-back.

== Career ==
Prósperi began his professional playing career with Godoy Cruz in 2005, after making 16 appearances for the club he was signed by Argentinos Juniors in 2006. He played on a fairly regular basis between 2006 and 2009 and in 2009 he became a near permanent fixture in the first team squad after the appointment of Claudio Borghi as manager.

Prósperi was an important member of the Argentinos Juniors team that won the Clausura 2010 championship. He played in 18 of the club's 19 games during their championship winning campaign. He joined San Lorenzo in 2012, he went onto make 56 appearances across his first five seasons with the team. Ahead of the 2016–17 Argentine Primera División season, he joined Banfield on loan.

== Honours ==
Argentinos Juniors

- Argentine Primera División: 2010 Clausura

San Lorenzo

- Argentine Primera División: 2013 Inicial
- Copa Libertadores: 2014
- Supercopa Argentina: 2015
