= Luis Ardente =

Argentine footballer (born 1981)

Personal information
- Full name: Luis Emanuel Ardente
- Date of birth: 17 September 1981 (age 45)
- Place of birth: San Isidro, Argentina
- Height: 1.87 m (6 ft 1 1/2 in)
- Position: Goalkeeper

Team information
- Current team: San Telmo

Youth career
- Glorias de Tigre
- Deportivo Tigre
- Tigre

Senior career*
Years	Team	Apps	(Gls)
2001–2011	Tigre	82	(0)
2006–2007	→ San Telmo (loan)	39	(0)
2011–2020	San Martín SJ	226	(9)
2020–2021	Estudiantes RC	8	(0)
2021	Boca Unidos	15	(0)
2022–	San Telmo	18	(0)
- * Club domestic league appearances and goals as of 19:25, 31 July 2022 (UTC)

Luis Emanuel Ardente (born 17 September 1981) is a former Argentine professional footballer who last played as a goalkeeper for Cañuelas FC.

== Career ==
Ardente had youth spells with Glorias de Tigre, Deportivo Tigre and Tigre. He got his first-team career underway with Tigre in 2001. He remained with the club for ten years, making a total of eighty-three appearances over the course of seasons in Primera B Metropolitana, Primera B Nacional and the Argentine Primera División. Midway through his spell, he was loaned to San Telmo of Primera B Metropolitana. Thirty-nine appearances followed during the 2006–07 season. On 17 July 2011, Ardente joined Argentine Primera División side San Martín. He made his debut on 9 June 2012 versus Unión Santa Fe.

That was the first of one hundred and eighteen matches in his first five campaigns. In April 2016, Ardente netted the first goal of his senior career by converting a penalty during a 4–3 defeat to Huracán. He scored another spot-kick a month later versus Atlético Tucumán. Seven further goals followed across the next two seasons; all of which were penalties. In July 2020, after nine years with the club, Ardente departed to join fellow Primera B Nacional team Estudiantes. He later revealed he had planned to retire at San Martín and only left after they decided not to renew his contract.

== Career statistics ==
As of 4 October 2020.

Club statistics
Club	Season	League			Cup		League Cup		Continental		Other		Total	
Club	Season	Division	Apps	Goals	Apps	Goals	Apps	Goals	Apps	Goals	Apps	Goals	Apps	Goals
San Telmo (loan)	2006–07	Primera B Metropolitana	39	0	0	0	—		—		0	0	39	0
San Martín	2011–12	Primera División	1	0	1	0	—		—		2 (Note: Appearance(s) in the Argentine Primera División play-offs)	0	4	0
San Martín	2012–13	Primera División	29	0	0	0	—		—		0	0	29	0
San Martín	2013–14	Primera B Nacional	35	0	1	0	—		—		0	0	36	0
San Martín	2014	Primera B Nacional	20	0	1	0	—		—		0	0	21	0
San Martín	2015	Primera División	25	0	2	0	—		—		1	0	28	0
San Martín	2016	Primera División	16	2	0	0	—		—		0	0	16	2
San Martín	2016–17	Primera División	27	1	0	0	—		—		0	0	27	1
San Martín	2017–18	Primera División	27	6	0	0	—		—		0	0	27	6
San Martín	2018–19	Primera División	25	0	2	0	2	0	—		0	0	29	0
San Martín	2019–20	Primera B Nacional	21	0	1	0	0	0	—		0	0	22	0
San Martín	Total		226	9	8	0	2	0	—		3	0	239	9
Estudiantes	2020–21	Argentine Primera B Nacional	0	0	0	0	—		—		0	0	0	0
Career total			265	9	8	0	2	0	—		3	0	278	9

== Honours ==
Tigre

- Primera B Metropolitana (2): 2004 Apertura, 2005 Clausura
