= Emiliano Agüero =

Argentine footballer (born 1995)

Personal information
- Full name: Emiliano Germán Agüero
- Date of birth: 21 January 1995 (age 31)
- Place of birth: Boulogne Sur Mer, Argentina
- Height: 1.75 m (5 ft 9 in)
- Position: Midfielder

Team information
- Current team: River Plate Asunción
- Number: 22

Senior career*
Years	Team	Apps	(Gls)
2014–2017	River Plate	0	(0)
2015	→ Argentinos Juniors (loan)	12	(0)
2016–2017	→ San Martín (loan)	14	(0)
2017–2018	San Martín	16	(1)
2018	Guillermo Brown	6	(0)
2019–	River Plate Asunción	50	(2)
- * Club domestic league appearances and goals as of 10:21, 20 December 2020 (UTC)

Emiliano Germán Agüero (born 21 January 1995) is an Argentine professional footballer who plays as a midfielder for River Plate (A).

== Career ==
Agüero started off in the system of Argentine Primera División team River Plate (BA), he was an unused substitute on two occasions in the 2013–14 campaign for matches against Atlético de Rafaela and Estudiantes. February 2015 saw him loaned out to fellow Primera División team Argentinos Juniors. Twelve appearances followed as the club finished 20th. He returned to River Plate ahead of 2016, but was immediately loaned out again to San Martín for eighteen months. He appeared just twice in the 2016 season for San Martín, prior to playing thirteen times in 2016–17 as they placed twenty-second.

San Martín signed Agüero permanently in June 2017. His first appearance as a full-time San Martín player came on 27 August versus Patronato, while he scored his first goal for them and of his senior career on 1 October against Rosario Central. In August 2018, Agüero made a move to Guillermo Brown in Primera B Nacional. Six appearances subsequently occurred, which preceded Agüero switching to Paraguayan football with River Plate (A) of the Paraguayan Primera División in January 2019.

== Career statistics ==
As of 6 January 2019.

Club statistics
Club	Season	League			Cup		Continental		Other		Total	
Club	Season	Division	Apps	Goals	Apps	Goals	Apps	Goals	Apps	Goals	Apps	Goals
River Plate (BA)	2013–14	Argentine Primera División	0	0	0	0	0	0	0	0	0	0
River Plate (BA)	2014	Argentine Primera División	0	0	0	0	0	0	0	0	0	0
River Plate (BA)	2015	Argentine Primera División	0	0	0	0	0	0	0	0	0	0
River Plate (BA)	2016	Argentine Primera División	0	0	0	0	0	0	0	0	0	0
River Plate (BA)	2016–17	Argentine Primera División	0	0	0	0	0	0	0	0	0	0
River Plate (BA)	Total		0	0	0	0	0	0	0	0	0	0
Argentinos Juniors (loan)	2015	Argentine Primera División	12	0	1	0	—		0	0	13	0
San Martín (loan)	2016	Argentine Primera División	1	0	1	0	—		0	0	2	0
San Martín (loan)	2016–17	Argentine Primera División	13	0	0	0	—		0	0	13	0
San Martín	2017–18	Argentine Primera División	16	1	0	0	—		0	0	16	1
San Martín	Total		30	1	0	0	—		0	0	30	1
Guillermo Brown	2018–19	Primera B Nacional	6	0	0	0	—		0	0	6	0
River Plate (A)	2019	Paraguayan Primera División	0	0	0	0	—		0	0	0	0
Career total			48	1	2	0	0	0	0	0	50	1
