= Alan Moreno =

Chilean footballer (born 1995)

Personal information
- Full name: Alan Mauricio Moreno Ávalos
- Date of birth: 30 October 1995 (age 31)
- Place of birth: Iquique, Chile
- Position: Defender

Team information
- Current team: Deportes Iquique

Youth career
- Deportes Iquique

Senior career*
| Years | Team | Apps | (Gls) |
| 2015–2020 | Deportes Iquique | 44 | (1) |
| 2020 | → Deportes Temuco (loan) | 13 | (0) |
| 2021– | Deportes Iquique | 0 | (0) |
- * Club domestic league appearances and goals as of 9 September 2020

Alan Mauricio Moreno Ávalos (born 30 October 1995) is a Chilean footballer who plays for Deportes Iquique.
