= Volpino =

Volpino may refer to:

- Costa Volpino, comune in Bergamo, Lombardy, Italy
- Volpino Italiano, Italian dog breed

== See also ==
- Volpini
