= Tomás Attis =

Argentine footballer

Personal information
- Full name: Tomás Adriel Attis
- Date of birth: 2 October 1999 (age 27)
- Place of birth: Las Junturas, Argentina
- Height: 1.80 m (5 ft 11 in)
- Position: Forward

Team information
- Current team: Patronato

Youth career
- Belgrano

Senior career*
Years	Team	Apps	(Gls)
2017–2024	Belgrano	11	(0)
2019–2020	→ San Fernando (loan)	15	(1)
2020–2021	→ Unión de Sunchales (loan)	30	(14)
2021	→ 9 de Julio (loan)	5	(0)
2022–2023	→ Sportivo Belgrano (loan)	57	(7)
2024–2025	Gimnasia y Tiro	32	(3)
2025–2026	Sportivo Belgrano	27	(5)
2026–	Patronato	1	(0)
- * Club domestic league appearances and goals as of 18:15, 23 March 2026 (UTC)

Tomás Adriel Attis (born 2 October 1999) is an Argentine football player who plays as forward for Patronato.
