= Pablo Aguilar (footballer, born 1984) =

Argentine football right back

Personal information
- Full name: Pablo Andrés Aguilar
- Date of birth: September 13, 1984 (age 42)
- Place of birth: Villa Mercedes, Argentina
- Height: 1.66 m (5 ft 5 in)
- Position: Right back

Team information
- Current team: San Martín San Juan
- Number: 25

Senior career*
Years	Team	Apps	(Gls)
2003–2007	Chacarita Juniors	77	(0)
2007–2009	Newell's Old Boys	39	(1)
2010	Tiro Federal	17	(1)
2010–2011	Chacarita Juniors	33	(0)
2011–2012	Defensa y Justicia	21	(0)
2012–2015	Sarmiento	108	(0)
2016–2018	San Martín	34	(0)
2019–2020	Sportivo Desamparados	11	(0)
- * Club domestic league appearances and goals

Pablo Andrés Aguilar (born 13 September 1984) is an Argentine former footballer who last played for Sportivo Desamparados.

Aguilar made his professional debut in 2003 playing for Chacarita Juniors in the Argentine Primera División. At the end of the 2003–2004 season Chacarita were relegated, but Aguilar stayed with the club in the 2nd division until 2007 when he joined Newell's Old Boys.
