= Braian Volpini =

Argentine footballer

Personal information
- Full name: Braian Alexis Volpini
- Date of birth: 16 June 1998 (age 28)
- Place of birth: Córdoba capital, Argentina
- Height: 1.79 m (5 ft 10 in)
- Position: Midfielder

Team information
- Current team: Fabbrico

Youth career
- Belgrano

Senior career*
Years	Team	Apps	(Gls)
2017–2018	Belgrano	1	(0)
2018	→ Senglea Athletic (loan)	5	(0)
2018–2019	Senglea Athletic	12	(3)
2019	Livorno	0	(0)
2019–2020	Puteolana		
2021	General Paz Juniors		
2021–2022	Ciliverghe		
2022–2023	Pozzonovo		
2023–	Fabbrico		
- * Club domestic league appearances and goals as of 17:24, 8 March 2021 (UTC)

Braian Alexis Volpini (born 16 June 1998) is an Argentine professional footballer who plays as a midfielder for Italian Eccellenza side Fabbrico.

== Career ==
Volpini's career with Belgrano began in 2017, when he made his debut on 22 June as a second-half substitute in an Argentine Primera División match against Newell's Old Boys. In January 2018, Volpini joined Maltese Premier League side Senglea Athletic on loan. He featured five times, prior to signing permanently in the following August. Goals followed in 2018–19 against Valletta, St. Andrews and Tarxien Rainbows as they placed eleventh. On 25 July 2019, Volpini moved to Italy with Serie B's Livorno. However, in September, Volpini would join Eccellenza Campania team Puteolana. He left in 2020.

Volpini returned to his homeland in March 2021 to sign with Torneo Regional Federal Amateur side General Paz Juniors. In August 2021, Volpini returned to Italy, signing with Eccellenza side Ciliverghe. In the summer 2022, he moved to fellow league club Pozzonovo. In September 2023, Volpini joined Fabbrico.

== Personal life ==
Whilst with Puteolana, Volpini ran into financial difficulties after a lack of bonuses due to the COVID-19 pandemic. His teammates Mario Follera and Paolo Sardo assisted him, while Frattese president Adamo Guarino donated him €500.

== Career statistics ==
As of 8 March 2021.

Club statistics
Club	Season	League			Cup		Continental		Other		Total	
Club	Season	Division	Apps	Goals	Apps	Goals	Apps	Goals	Apps	Goals	Apps	Goals
Belgrano	2016–17	Primera División	1	0	0	0	0	0	0	0	1	0
Belgrano	2017–18	Primera División	0	0	0	0	—		0	0	0	0
Belgrano	Total		1	0	0	0	0	0	0	0	1	0
Senglea Athletic (loan)	2017–18	Premier League	5	0	—		—		0	0	5	0
Senglea Athletic	2018–19	Premier League	12	3	0	0	—		0	0	12	3
Senglea Athletic	Total		17	3	0	0	0	0	0	0	17	3
Livorno	2019–20	Serie B	0	0	0	0	—		0	0	0	0
General Paz Juniors	2021–22	Federal Amateur	0	0	0	0	—		0	0	0	0
Career total			18	3	0	0	0	0	0	0	18	3
