= Matías Escudero =

Argentinian footballer (born 1988)

Personal information
- Date of birth: 15 December 1988 (age 37)
- Place of birth: San Luis, Argentina
- Height: 1.76 m (5 ft 9 in)
- Position: Centre-back

Youth career
- Nueva Chicago

Senior career*
Years	Team	Apps	(Gls)
2009–2014	Nueva Chicago	59	(5)
2015	Palestino	14	(0)
2016–2018	San Martín SJ	53	(2)
2018–2020	Patronato	22	(0)
2020–2021	Nueva Chicago	14	(2)
2022	San Martín SJ	29	(1)
2023–2025	Güemes	48	(1)
- * Club domestic league appearances and goals as of 16:25, 31 May 2025 (UTC)

Matías Andrés Escudero (born 15 December 1988) is an Argentine footballer who plays as a centre-back.

== Honours ==
Nueva Chicago

- Argentine Primera B Metropolitana Championship: 2013–14
