= Juan Quiroga (footballer, born 1982) =

Argentine footballer

Juan Leandro Quiroga
Personal information
- Full name: Juan Leandro Quiroga
- Date of birth: April 20, 1982 (age 44)
- Place of birth: Monte Buey, Argentina
- Height: 1.79 m (5 ft 10 in)
- Position: Left-back

Youth career
- Banfield

Senior career*
Years	Team	Apps	(Gls)
2002–2004	Banfield	7	(0)
2004–2007	Defensa y Justicia	45	(0)
2007	Puebla	13	(0)
2008–2011	Newell's Old Boys	64	(1)
2010–2011	→ Colón (loan)	32	(0)
2011–2014	Belgrano	75	(0)
2014–2015	Gimnasia de La Plata	12	(0)
2015–2017	Olimpo	37	(0)
2017–2020	Belgrano	36	(0)
- * Club domestic league appearances and goals

Juan Leandro Quiroga (born 20 April 1982 in Córdoba) is a retired Argentine footballer.

== Career ==
Quiroga started his playing career with Banfield in 2002. Between 2004 and 2007 he played in the Argentine 2nd Division with Defensa y Justicia. He had a short spell with Puebla F.C. in Mexico before joining Newell's in 2008. On 20 May 2010 the Newell's Old Boys 28-year-old left wingback joined on loan to Club Atlético Colón.
