= 2021 Copa de la Liga Profesional final =

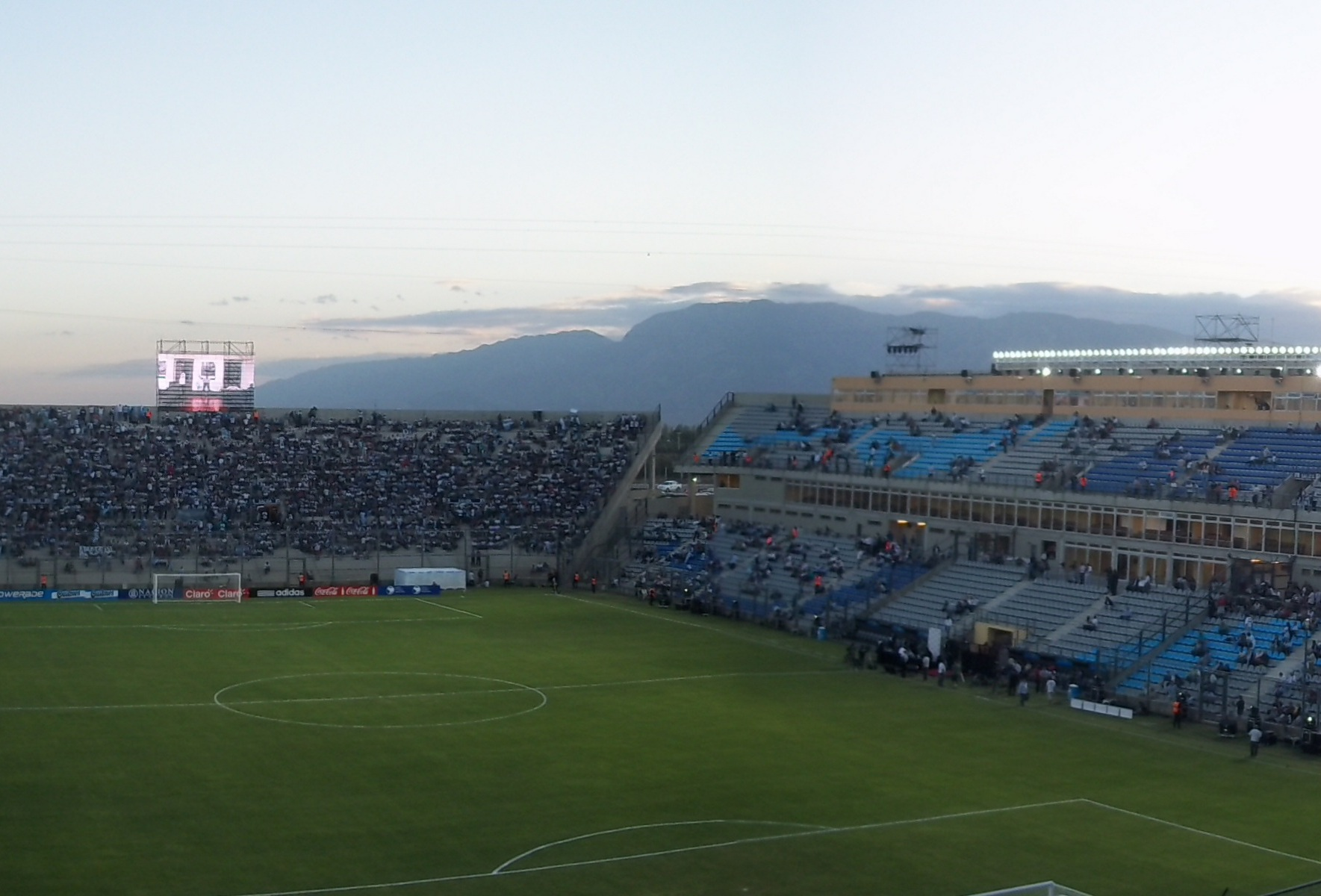
- Estadio San Juan del Bicentenario, venue
- Event: 2021 Copa LPF
Colón	Racing
3	0
- Date: 4 June 2021
- Venue: San Juan del Bicentenario, San Juan
- Man of the Match: Rodrigo Aliendro (Colón)
- Referee: Néstor Pitana
- Attendance: 0

The 2021 Copa de la Liga Profesional final was the final match of the 2021 Copa de la Liga Profesional, the second edition of this national cup. It was played at the Estadio San Juan del Bicentenario in San Juan on 4 June 2021 between Colón and Racing.

The final was originally scheduled to be played at the Estadio Único Madre de Ciudades in Santiago del Estero on 30 May 2021. However, due to the worsening of the COVID-19 pandemic in Argentina, the President of Argentina suspended all the activities in Argentina between 22 and 30 May 2021, and the final had to be rescheduled.

Colón won the match 3–0 obtaining the first top-flight professional title in their history. As champions, Colón qualified for the 2022 Copa Libertadores (Regulations Article 25).

== Qualified teams ==
Team	Previous finals appearances (bold indicates winners)
Colón	None
Racing	None

=== Road to the final ===
Note: In all results below, the score of the finalist is given first (H: home; A: away; N: neutral).

Colón		Round	Racing	
Opponent	Result	Group stage	Opponent	Result
Central Córdoba (SdE)	3–0 (A)	Matchday 1	Banfield	0–2 (A)
San Lorenzo	2–0 (H)	Matchday 2	Aldosivi	2–2 (H)
Banfield	3–0 (A)	Matchday 3	Estudiantes (LP)	0–0 (A)
Aldosivi	2–1 (H)	Matchday 4	Rosario Central	1–0 (H)
Estudiantes (LP)	2–0 (A)	Matchday 5	Platense	2–0 (A)
Rosario Central	0–0 (H)	Matchday 6	Argentinos Juniors	1–0 (H)
Platense	3–1 (A)	Matchday 7	River Plate	0–0 (A)
Argentinos Juniors	0–0 (H)	Matchday 8	Godoy Cruz	2–4 (H)
River Plate	2–3 (A)	Matchday 9	Independiente	1–0 (H)
Godoy Cruz	2–2 (H)	Matchday 10	Arsenal	1–2 (A)
Racing	1–2 (A)	Matchday 11	Colón	2–1 (H)
Arsenal	2–0 (H)	Matchday 12	Central Córdoba (SdE)	0–1 (A)
Unión	1–1 (H)	Matchday 13	San Lorenzo	2–0 (H)
**Zone A winners**: Pos / Team / Pld / Pts; **1** / Colón / **13** / **25**; 2 / Estudiantes (LP) / 13 / **22**; 3 / River Plate / 13 / **21**; 4 / Racing / 13 / **21**; 5 / San Lorenzo / 13 / **21**; Source: AFA		Final standings	**Zone A 4th place**: Pos / Team / Pld / Pts; 2 / Estudiantes (LP) / 13 / **22**; 3 / River Plate / 13 / **21**; **4** / Racing / **13** / **21**; 5 / San Lorenzo / 13 / **21**; 6 / Banfield / 13 / **20**; Source: AFA	
Opponent	Result	Final stages	Opponent	Result
Talleres (C)	1–1 (5–3 p) (H)	Quarter-finals	Vélez Sarsfield	0–0 (4–2 p) (A)
Independiente	2–0 (N)	Semi-finals	Boca Juniors	0–0 (4–2 p) (N)

== Match ==
Gabriel Arias and Eugenio Mena (Racing) were called-up for the Chile National Team and they could not play the final. The Colón players Bruno Bianchi (injury), Facundo Farías (COVID-19) and Rafael Delgado (suspension) were ruled out of the final.

=== Details ===
4 June 2021
19:00

Colón	3–0	Racing
Aliendro 57'; Bernardi 71'; Castro 85'	Report

Estadio San Juan del Bicentenario, San Juan
Attendance: 0
Referee: Néstor Pitana

Colón	Racing

GK	1	(Uruguay) Leonardo Burián
RB	4	(Argentina) Facundo Mura
CB	33	(Argentina) Facundo Garcés	(yellow card) 48'
CB	3	(Argentina) Gonzalo Piovi
LB	31	(Argentina) Gonzalo Escobar
RM	23	(Argentina) Christian Bernardi	(yellow card) 79'	(substituted off) 79'
CM	14	(Argentina) Federico Lértora
LM	29	(Argentina) Rodrigo Aliendro
AM	11	(Argentina) Alexis Castro		(substituted off) 87'
AM	16	(Argentina) Cristian Ferreira
CF	10	(Argentina) Luis Miguel Rodríguez (c)	(yellow card) 63'	(substituted off) 63'
Substitutes:
GK	17	(Argentina) Ignacio Chicco
DF	6	(Argentina) Paolo Goltz
DF	15	(Argentina) Lucas Acevedo
DF	21	(Argentina) Eric Meza
MF	5	(Argentina) Tomás Moschión
MF	8	(Colombia) Yéiler Góez		(substituted in) 87'
MF	27	(Argentina) Guillermo Gozálvez
MF	42	(Argentina) Danilo Gómez
FW	18	(Argentina) Nicolás Leguizamón		(substituted in) 63'
FW	19	(Colombia) Wilson Morelo
FW	30	(Argentina) Santiago Pierotti		(substituted in) 79'
FW	32	(Argentina) Tomás Sandoval
Manager:
(Argentina) Eduardo Domínguez

GK	25	(Argentina) Gastón Gómez	(yellow card) 71'
RB	4	(Argentina) Iván Pillud (c)		(substituted off) 82'
CB	30	(Argentina) Leonardo Sigali
CB	23	(Argentina) Nery Domínguez		(substituted off) 73'
LB	6	(Argentina) Lucas Orbán
RM	19	(Argentina) Leonel Miranda
CM	16	(Argentina) Mauricio Martínez	(yellow card) 33'	(substituted off) 64'
LM	15	(Argentina) Ignacio Piatti		(substituted off) 64'
RW	28	(Argentina) Tomás Chancalay
CF	20	(Argentina) Darío Cvitanich		(substituted off) 46'
LW	9	(Argentina) Enzo Copetti
Substitutes:
GK	13	(Argentina) Matías Tagliamonte
DF	2	(Argentina) Juan José Cáceres		(substituted in) 82'
DF	18	(Italy) Ezequiel Schelotto
DF	40	(Argentina) Joaquín Novillo
DF	50	(Argentina) Ignacio Galván		(substituted in) 73'
MF	8	(Uruguay) Fabricio Domínguez
MF	10	(Paraguay) Matías Rojas		(substituted in) 64'
MF	21	(Chile) Marcelo Díaz
MF	29	(Argentina) Aníbal Moreno		(substituted in) 46'
MF	35	(Paraguay) Lorenzo Melgarejo
FW	34	(Argentina) Maximiliano Lovera		(substituted in) 64'
FW	44	(Argentina) Iván Maggi
Manager:
(Spain) Juan Antonio Pizzi

Man of the Match:
Rodrigo Aliendro (Colón)

Assistant referees:
Lucas Germanotta
José Castelli
Fourth official:
Andrés Merlos
Reserve assistant referee:
Daiana Milone

Match rules

- 90 minutes
- 30 minutes of extra time if necessary
- Penalty shoot-out if scores still level
- Twelve named substitutes
- Maximum of five substitutions

=== Statistics ===
Overall
Statistic	Colón	Racing
Goals scored	3	0
Total shots	12	4
Shots on target	8	2
Ball possession	51%	49%
Corner kicks	3	1
Fouls committed	7	11
Offsides	3	3
Yellow cards	3	2
Red cards	0	0
