= 2021 Trofeo de Campeones de la Liga Profesional =

- Promotional poster of the final
- Event: Trofeo de Campeones (LPF)
River Plate	Colón
4	0
- Date: 18 December 2021
- Venue: Estadio Único Madre de Ciudades, Santiago del Estero
- Referee: Patricio Loustau
- Attendance: 30,000

The 2021 Trofeo de Campeones de la Liga Profesional was a football match between the winners of the Copa de la Liga Profesional and Argentine Primera División. The match was contested by the 2021 Primera División champions River Plate and the 2021 Copa de la Liga Profesional winners Colón on 18 December 2021 at the Estadio Único Madre de Ciudades, Santiago del Estero. Both teams were appearing in the competition for the first time.

River Plate qualified as a result of winning the Primera División, finishing seven points ahead of the second-placed team. Colón entered the competition after winning the Copa de la Liga Profesional final against Racing Club 3–0.

Watched by a crowd of 30,000, Julián Alvarez opened the scoring for River Plate nearing the end of the first half. The striker extended their lead in the second half, and two further goals from Benjamin Rollheiser and Jorge Carrascal sealed 4–0 a rout in favour of River Plate, who consequently secured their first Trofeo de Campeones title.

== Background ==
Founded in 2020, the Trofeo de Campeones de la Liga Profesional was contested between the Primera División champions and the Copa de la Liga Profesional winners. It functioned as a super cup, pairing the two domestic champions of the Argentine football season organised by the Liga Profesional. However, in 2025 the Argentine Football Association changed the format for its upcoming season, causing both the Copa de la Liga and Liga Profesional to come to an end. Since then, the Trofeo de Campeones is contested by the Torneo Apertura and the Torneo Clausura winners.

River Plate entered the tournament by winning the Primera División, in which they finished seven points clear of second-placed team Defensa y Justicia. Colón were the holders of the Copa de la Liga Profesional, having won the final match of the tournament 3–0 against Racing Club, therefore ensuring their right to participate in the match.

The teams had played two games against each other during the 2021 season, both of which were held at River Plate's home ground of Estadio Monumental. In the ninth matchday of the Copa de la Liga, River Plate earned a 3–2 victory. In turn, Colón won the league fixture 2–1. As a result, the Trofeo de Campeones match was to be their third meeting of the season, and their first in the competition.

== Match ==
=== Summary ===
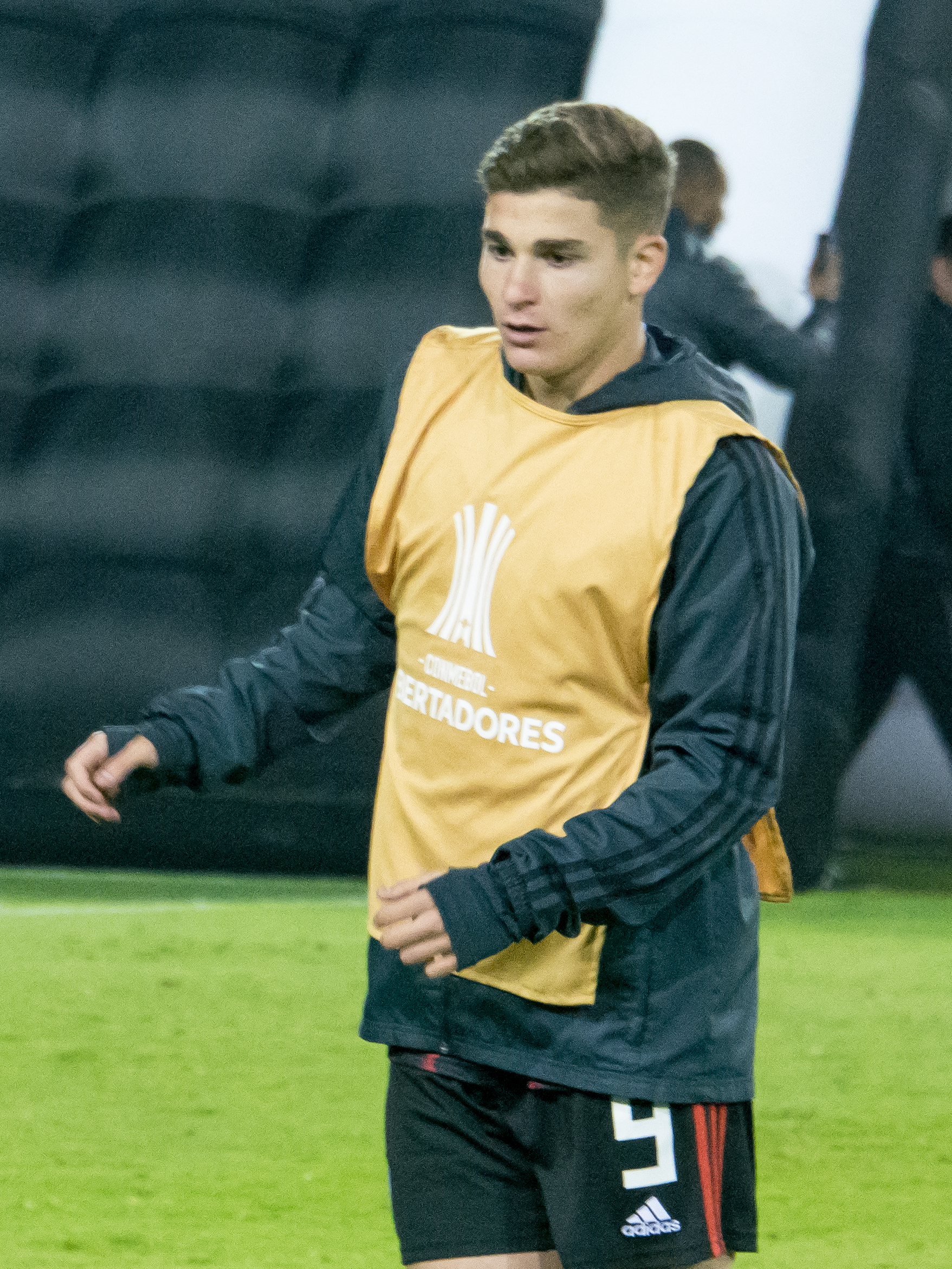
Julián Alvarez took part in the four goals scored by his team.

Neither side dominated the game in the first few minutes, as both teams lined up similar formations. Nonetheless, they exchanged chances shortly after the first whistle, following a Eric Meza run from right side for Colón and a dangerous cross by midfielder José Paradela for River Plate. In the seventh minute, centre-back David Martínez was shown a yellow card, stemming from a challenge on Colón's Facundo Farías. Opportunities continued to arise as Cristian Ferreira found Rodrigo Aliendro after a rebound from a set piece, but the midfielder headed wide. River Plate replied through Julián Alvarez, who unveiled a weak shot from the left side that was saved by goalkeeper Leonardo Burián. They followed up with a corner kick at the 14-minute mark, which Bruno Zuculini headed just high. The midfielder himself was booked six minutes later, after a late tackle on Christian Bernardi. The pace of the match slowed down from this point onwards, as the teams contested heavily in the midfield for ball possession. Colón were handed their first yellow card near the half-hour mark, when Alexis Castro committed a reckless foul on Paradela. Six minutes later, they doubled down as Federico Lértora was also booked. The match seemed to head goalless for the interval, but River Plate broke the parity. In the 40th minute, Santiago Simón crossed for Alvarez in the penalty area. The delivery went past defender Bruno Bianchi and fell to the striker, whose left-footed shot beat goalkeeper Burián. They almost extended their lead two minutes later, after centre-back Paolo Goltz nearly swung the ball into his own net. However, the score remained for half-time.

The second half started with River Plate attempting to add one further. Their first chance came just two minutes after the restart, when a Simón effort went over the crossbar following a rebound. They eventually managed to score their second goal in the 57th minute, following a one-two passing play between Agustín Palavecino and Paradela that led to Alvarez securing a brace, after tapping in a rebound off a shot Burián had stopped him. At the 63-minute mark, both teams made use of their substitutions, with River Plate replacing Palavecino for forward Jorge Carrascal and their opposition making three changes of their own. Shortly after, Colón had a chance to pull one back through a cross from Facundo Mura, but his delivery was unable to be met. They managed to make attempts to reduce the deficit, but the pace of the match ultimately began to be controlled by River Plate, as spaces in the opposing defense started to show. In the 81st minute, Colón picked up their third yellow card. Moments later, River Plate added another goal after a play from Alvarez, who got rid of several defenders and took a shot across the net that hit the post. The ball then fell to subbed in Benjamin Rollheiser, who scored off the rebound. One minute away from stoppage time, Carrascal controlled a pass from Alvarez and unleashed a shot to the near post to make it 4–0. Colón left-back Rafael Delgado was sent off during the goal celebration after he initiated a brawl. The match would subsequently finish, crowning River Plate as champions of their first Trofeo de Campeones title.

=== Details ===
18 December 2021
21:10 UTC−3

River Plate	4–0	Colón
Alvarez 40', 57'; Rollheiser 83'; Carrascal 89'	Report

Estadio Único Madre de Ciudades, Santiago del Estero
Attendance: 30,000
Referee: Patricio Loustau

River Plate	Colón

GK	1	(Argentina) Franco Armani (c)
RB	2	(Paraguay) Robert Rojas
CB	17	(Chile) Paulo Díaz
CB	6	(Paraguay) David Martínez	(yellow card) 6'
LB	20	(Argentina) Milton Casco
CM	13	(Argentina) Enzo Fernández		(substituted off) 76'
CM	5	(Argentina) Bruno Zuculini	(yellow card) 20'
RW	31	(Argentina) Santiago Simón		(substituted off) 76'
AM	8	(Argentina) Agustín Palavecino		(substituted off) 62'
LW	26	(Argentina) José Paradela		(substituted off) 76'
CF	9	(Argentina) Julián Alvarez
Substitutes:
GK	14	(Argentina) Germán Lux
GK	25	(Argentina) Enrique Bologna
DF	4	(Argentina) Jonatan Maidana
DF	16	(Argentina) Alex Vigo
DF	22	(Argentina) Javier Pinola
MF	10	(Colombia) Jorge Carrascal		(substituted on) 62'
MF	23	(Argentina) Leonardo Ponzio		(substituted on) 76'
MF	33	(Argentina) Tomás Galván		(substituted on) 76'
FW	15	(Argentina) Federico Girotti
FW	27	(Argentina) Agustín Fontana
FW	30	(Argentina) Benjamín Rollheiser		(substituted on) 76'
Manager:
(Argentina) Marcelo Gallardo

GK	1	(Uruguay) Leonardo Burián
RB	21	(Argentina) Eric Meza		(substituted off) 63'
CB	2	(Argentina) Bruno Bianchi
CB	6	(Argentina) Paolo Goltz	(yellow card) 81'
LB	40	(Argentina) Rafael Delgado	(red card) 90'
RM	11	(Argentina) Alexis Castro	(yellow card) 31'
DM	14	(Argentina) Federico Lértora	(yellow card) 36'
LM	29	(Argentina) Rodrigo Aliendro
AM	23	(Argentina) Christian Bernardi (c)		(substituted off) 63'
AM	16	(Argentina) Cristian Ferreira		(substituted off) 63'
CF	35	(Argentina) Facundo Farías		(substituted off) 81'
Substitutes:
GK	17	(Argentina) Ignacio Chicco
DF	3	(Argentina) Gonzalo Piovi
DF	4	(Argentina) Facundo Mura		(substituted on) 63'
DF	24	(Argentina) Nahuel Gallardo
DF	33	(Argentina) Facundo Garcés
MF	5	(Argentina) Tomás Moschión
MF	7	(Argentina) Mauro Formica
MF	8	(Colombia) Yéiler Góez
FW	9	(Argentina) Lucas Beltrán		(substituted on) 63'
FW	18	(Argentina) Nicolás Leguizamón		(substituted on) 81'
FW	19	(Colombia) Wilson Morelo
FW	30	(Argentina) Santiago Pierotti		(substituted on) 63'
Manager:
(Argentina) Eduardo Domínguez

Assistant referees
Juan Pablo Belatti
Maximiliano Del Yesso
Fourth official
Pablo Echavarría
Fifth official
Lucas Germanotta

Match rules

- 90 minutes
- 30 minutes of extra time if necessary
- Penalty shoot-out if scores still level
- Twelve named substitutes
- Maximum of five substitutions, with a sixth allowed in extra time

=== Statistics ===
Overall
Statistic	River Plate	Colón
Goals scored	4	0
Total shots	15	7
Shots on target	9	4
Ball possession	57%	43%
Corner kicks	4	2
Fouls committed	8	13
Offsides	0	3
Yellow cards	2	3
Red cards	0	1
