= Monteros Department =

Coordinates: 27°09′54″S 65°29′52″W

Monteros
- Department
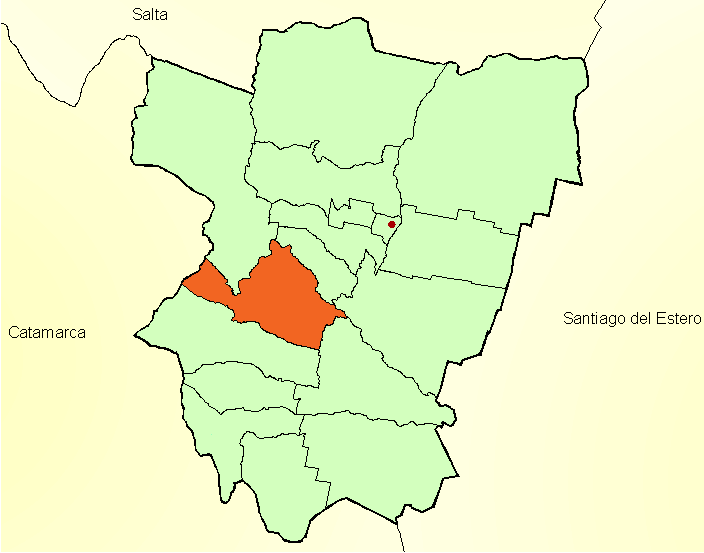
- Location of Monteros Department in Tucumán Province.
- Country: Argentina
- Province: Tucumán

Area
  - Total: 1,169 km^{2} (451 sq mi)

Population (2022)
  - Total: 77,551

Monteros Department is a department in Tucumán Province, Argentina. It has a population of 58,442 and an area of 1,169 km^{2}. The seat of the department is in Monteros.

== Municipalities and communes ==
- Acheral
- Amberes
- Capitán Cáceres
- El Cercado
- Los Sosas
- Monteros
- Río Seco
- Santa Lucía
- Santa Rosa y Los Rojo
- Sargento Moya
- Soldado Maldonado
- Teniente Berdina
- Villa Quinteros
