= Franco Sosa (footballer, born 1981) =

Argentine footballer

Personal information
- Full name: Franco Sebastián Sosa
- Date of birth: April 4, 1981 (age 45)
- Place of birth: Monteros, Argentina
- Height: 1.75 m (5 ft 9 in)
- Position: Right back

Team information
- Current team: Ñuñorco

Senior career*
Years	Team	Apps	(Gls)
2001–2006	Gimnasia de Jujuy	129	(7)
2007–2009	Racing Club	86	(9)
2009–2011	FC Lorient	46	(3)
2011–2013	Boca Juniors	26	(0)
2013–2014	Gimnasia de Jujuy	14	(0)
2014	Juventud Antoniana	14	(1)
2015	Cúcuta Deportivo	8	(1)
2016–2017	Talleres de Perico	10	(0)
2017–2018	Concepción	15	(1)
2018–	Ñuñorco		
- * Club domestic league appearances and goals

Franco Sebastián Sosa (born 4 April 1981) is an Argentine football defender currently playing for Ñuñorco.

== Career ==
Born in Monteros, Tucumán Province, Sosa started his playing career in 2001 with Gimnasia y Esgrima de Jujuy of the Argentine 2nd division. He was part of the team that won the Clausura 2005 and obtained promotion to the Argentine Primera. Sosa played for Gimnasia until the end of 2006, making over 100 appearances for the club, 43 in the Primera.

During the January 2006 transfer window Sosa joined Racing Club, quickly establishing himself as a key member of their defence, making appearances in 33 of the club's 38 matches in 2007.

He played for the FC Lorient (French Premier League) during the 2009–2010 season. He signed a 3-year contract, on 22 July 2009.

In 2011, he returned to Argentina to play with Boca Juniors.

== Titles ==
Season	Team	Title
Clausura 2005	Gimnasia y Esgrima de Jujuy	Primera B Nacional
Apertura 2011	Boca Juniors	Primera División
Copa Argentina 2012	Boca Juniors	Copa Argentina
