= Guillermo Gonzalez =

Guillermo Gonzalez may refer to:

- Guillermo Gonzalez (astronomer) (born 1963), Cuban astrophysicist and promoter of intelligent design
- Guillermo González (athlete) (born 1950), Dominican athlete
- Guillermo González Bastias (1912–?), Chilean academic and naval officer, rector of the University of Concepción
- Guillermo González Calderoni (1948–2003), commander of the Mexican Federal Judicial Police
- Guillermo González Camarena (1917–1965), Mexican engineer who was an inventor of modern color television
- Guillermo González Echenique (fl. 1930s), Chilean journalist and politician
- Guillermo González (politician) (1941–2021), Colombian politician
- Guillermo González (pianist) (born 1945), Spanish classical pianist
- Guillermo González Prats (fl. 1940s), Chilean lawyer and politician
- Guillermo González Regalado (1945–2020), Spanish-Venezuelan presenter, actor and businessman
- Guillermo González del Río García (1912–1984), Spanish footballer
- Guillermo González Sánchez (1900–1970), Dominican architect, Fair of Peace and Fraternity of the Free World
- Guillermo Gonzalez (soccer) (born 1986), American soccer player

== See also ==
- Guillermo Gonzales (born 1976), Italian singer, songwriter and musician
- Guillermo Gozálvez (born 2003), Argentine footballer
