= Juan Jaime (footballer) =

Argentine footballer (born 1993)

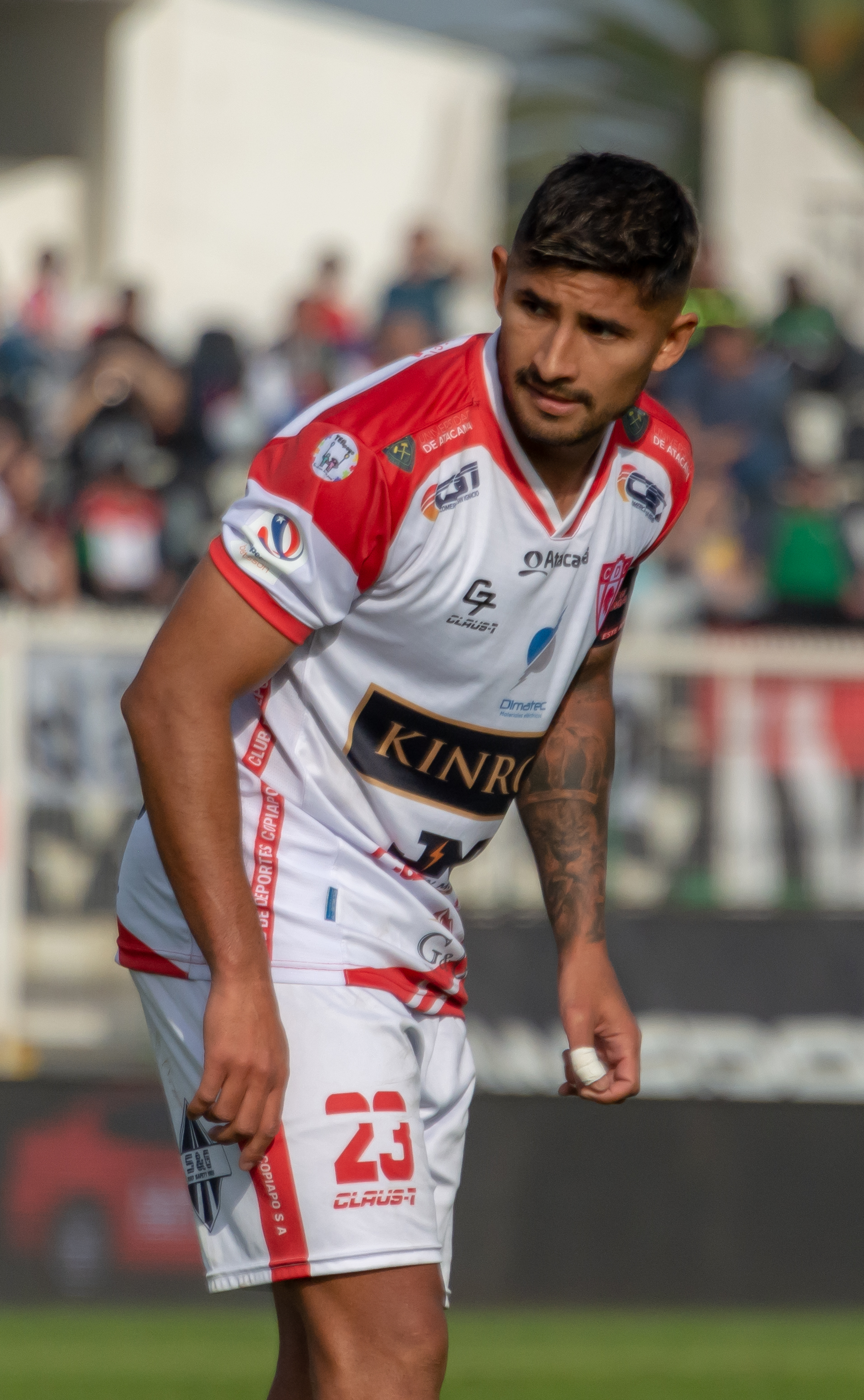
- Jaime with Deportes Copiapó in 2023

Personal information
- Full name: Juan Miguel Jaime
- Date of birth: January 1, 1993 (age 33)
- Place of birth: Monteros, Tucumán, Argentina
- Height: 1.76 m (5 ft 9 in)
- Position: Midfielder

Team information
- Current team: Deportes Puerto Montt
- Number: 22

Youth career
- 2006: Ñuñorco
- 2006: Boca Juniors
- 2007–2011: Lanús

Senior career*
Years	Team	Apps	(Gls)
2011–2015	Lanús	1	(0)
2013–2014	→ Douglas Haig (loan)	17	(0)
2016	Talleres RdE	20	(1)
2017–2024	Deportes Copiapó	199	(20)
2025	Deportes Temuco	14	(0)
2026–	Deportes Puerto Montt	0	(0)
- * Club domestic league appearances and goals as of 16 December 2024

Juan Miguel Jaime (born January 1, 1993) is an Argentine footballer who plays as a midfielder for Deportes Puerto Montt. He previously played for Lanús, Douglas Haig and Talleres de Remedios de Escalada in the top three divisions of the Argentine league.

== Life and career ==
Jaime was born in Monteros, in the Tucumán Province of Argentina, where he attended the Escuela Nacional Superior de Comercio. He played youth football for Ñuñorco, and in 2005 was selected for a Liga Tucumana under-13 representative team to travel to Europe, visiting Spain and Denmark before playing in Sweden in tournaments including the Gothia Cup. Still young enough to be part of the next season's team, Jaime helped them reach the Gothia Cup final, in which, according to La Gaceta, he gave his all in scoring the equaliser; the match was settled in a penalty shoot-out in which the Liga Tucumana beat their Italian opponents 7–6. His performances earned him a move to Buenos Aires-based Primera División club Boca Juniors, but he stayed only a few months, and by 2007 was in the youth system of another major club, Lanús.

He made his debut – and only league appearance – for Lanús on March 16, 2012, starting in a 1–0 Primera División defeat at home to Argentinos Juniors. Jaime spent the 2013–14 Primera B Nacional season on loan at Douglas Haig; he made 17 league appearances and was a regular in the matchday squad. In 2016, Jaime joined Talleres de Remedios de Escalada, newly promoted to the third-tier Primera B Metropolitana. He spent a year with Talleres, for whom he scored his first senior goal to seal a 2–0 home win against Deportivo Armenio on May 6. In January 2017, Jaime signed for Deportes Copiapó of the Primera B de Chile.

After eight years with Deportes Copiapó, Jaime switched to Deportes Temuco for the 2025 season. The next season, he switched to Deportes Puerto Montt.
