= Alexis Castro =

Alexis Castro may refer to:

- Alexis Castro (footballer, born 1984), Argentine footballer for Aldosivi, on loan from Newell's Old Boys
- Alexis Castro (footballer, born 1994), Argentine footballer for Tigre
