= Juan Jaime =

Juan Jaime may refer to:

- Juan Jaime (baseball) (1987–2024), Dominican baseball player
- Juan Jaime (footballer) (born 1993), Argentine footballer
