= Danilo Gomes =

Danilo Gomes may refer to:

- Danilo Gustavo Vergne Gomes (born 1981), Brazilian former football midfielder
- Danilo Gomes Magalhães (born 1999), Brazilian football attacking midfielder

== See also ==
- Danilo Gómez (born 2002), Argentine professional footballer
