= Hugo Moreno =

Argentinian footballer (1955–2025)

Personal information
- Full name: Hugo Alberto Moreno
- Date of birth: 1955
- Place of birth: Tucumán, Argentina
- Date of death: 19 October 2025 (aged 69–70)
- Position: Defender

Senior career*
Years	Team	Apps	(Gls)
1972–1978	Atlético Tucumán		
1979–1982	San Lorenzo		
1983–1985	Estudiantes		
1986	Tucumán		
- * Club domestic league appearances and goals

Hugo Alberto Moreno (1955 – 19 October 2025) was an Argentinian footballer. Nicknamed "Nube Negra", he played as a defender for Atlético Tucumán and San Lorenzo throughout the 1970s and the 1980s.

== Club career ==
Moreno began his career with Tucumán in 1972 but wouldn't make his full debut until the 1974 season where he mostly played as a substitute. He then played in the Tucumán campaign of 1975 Campeonato Nacional where they made it to the final stage of the tournament. That same season, they won the Liga Tucumana de Fútbol with this achievement being repeated two years later in 1977 and 1978.

His talents later earned him enough of a reputation to be scouted by San Lorenzo in 1979, playing alongside other players such as René Alderete, Humberto Baigorria and Osvaldo Cristofanelli. Despite the club being relegated during the 1981 season, the club was promoted the following season through winning the 1982 Primera B Metropolitana. During the 1981 season in a 0–0 draw against Boca Juniors, Moreno had played against Diego Maradona where the latter would ask about his nickname of "Nube Negra".

He then played for Estudiantes de La Plata in the following season where he earned his first national title through being part of the winning squad for the 1983 Campeonato Metropolitano where it was also the first national title for Los Leones. The following season wasn't as nearly as successful as the club found itself on the relegation table but would regain a modicum of success in the following 1985 season. He spent his final season with Atlético Tucumán once more for the 1985–86 season where the club once more won the Liga Tucumana that season.

== Personal life ==
Moreno died on 19 October 2025.
