= Alexis Castro (footballer, born 1984) =

Argentine footballer

Personal information
- Full name: Alexis Nicolás Castro
- Date of birth: 23 January 1984 (age 42)
- Place of birth: Córdoba, Argentina
- Height: 1.74 m (5 ft 9 in)
- Position: Midfielder

Team information
- Current team: Sarmiento Resistencia

Senior career*
Years	Team	Apps	(Gls)
2004–2007	Instituto	24	(1)
2007	Al-Ahli		
2007–2008	Huracán	8	(0)
2008–2009	Atlético Tucumán	20	(2)
2009–2012	Atlético de Rafaela	110	(27)
2012–2013	Godoy Cruz	52	(5)
2014–2017	Newell's Old Boys	33	(4)
2015	→ Sarmiento (loan)	14	(0)
2016–2017	→ Aldosivi (loan)	27	(1)
2017–2018	Atlético de Rafaela	16	(0)
2019–	Sarmiento Resistencia	2	(0)
- * Club domestic league appearances and goals as of 1 April 2019

Alexis Nicolás Castro (born 23 January 1984) is an Argentine footballer who plays as a midfielder for Sarmiento Resistencia

== Career ==
=== Club ===
Castro started his career with Instituto in 2004, he made 24 league appearances and scored one goal for the club before he left in 2007 to join UAE Arabian Gulf League side Al-Ahli. However, his spell with Al-Ahli was short as he left soon after to return to Argentina and join Huracán but after just 8 appearances in one year with Huracán, he was soon on the move again as, in 2008, he agreed to sign for Atlético Tucumán. 20 appearances and 12 months later, Castro departed Atlético Tucumán after winning the 2008–09 Primera B Nacional and joined Atlético de Rafaela. In three years with Rafaela, Castro participated in 110 matches, scored 27 goals and won the 2010–11 Primera B Nacional.

2012 saw a move firstly to Godoy Cruz and then to Newell's Old Boys. In June 2015, he was loaned out to Sarmiento. He made 14 Argentine Primera División appearances for Sarmiento before returning to Newell's Old Boys. In January 2016, Castro completed a loan move to Aldosivi and made his debut for the club on 6 February against Olimpo.

== Career statistics ==
=== Club ===
As of 2 November 2016.

Club statistics
Club	Season	League			Cup (Note: Includes the Copa Argentina)		League Cup		Continental (Note: Includes the Copa Libertadores and Copa Sudamericana)		Other		Total	
Club	Season	Division	Apps	Goals	Apps	Goals	Apps	Goals	Apps	Goals	Apps	Goals	Apps	Goals
Newell's Old Boys	2013–14	Argentine Primera División	16	3	0	0	—		0	0	0	0	16	3
Newell's Old Boys	2014	Argentine Primera División	3	0	1	0	—		5 (Note: Five appearances in 2014 Copa Libertadores)	1	0	0	9	1
Newell's Old Boys	2015	Argentine Primera División	14	1	1	0	—		—		0	0	15	1
Newell's Old Boys	2016	Argentine Primera División	0	0	0	0	—		—		0	0	0	0
Newell's Old Boys	2016–17	Argentine Primera División	0	0	0	0	—		—		0	0	0	0
Newell's Old Boys	Total		33	4	2	0	—		5	1	0	0	40	5
Sarmiento (loan)	2015	Argentine Primera División	14	0	0	0	—		—		0	0	14	0
Aldosivi (loan)	2016	Argentine Primera División	13	1	1	0	—		—		0	0	14	1
Aldosivi (loan)	2016–17	Argentine Primera División	5	0	0	0	—		—		0	0	5	0
Total			32	1	1	0	—		—		0	0	33	1
Career total			65	5	3	0	—		5	1	0	0	73	6

== Honours ==
=== Club ===
Atlético Tucumán

- Primera B Nacional (1): 2008–09

Atlético de Rafaela

- Primera B Nacional (1): 2010–11
