= Danilo Gómez =

Argentine professional footballer

Personal information
- Full name: Danilo Alexandro Gómez
- Date of birth: 12 February 2002 (age 24)
- Place of birth: Franck, Argentina
- Height: 1.80 m (5 ft 11 in)
- Position: Midfielder

Team information
- Current team: Colón

Youth career
- Colón

Senior career*
Years	Team	Apps	(Gls)
2020–	Colón	1	(0)

International career
- Argentina U15
- Argentina U16
- * Club domestic league appearances and goals as of 04:14, 13 February 2021 (UTC)

Danilo Alexandro Gómez (born 12 February 2002) is an Argentine professional footballer who plays as a midfielder for Colón.

== Club career ==
Gómez joined Colón at the age of eight. He was moved into Eduardo Domínguez's first-team midway through 2020, initially training with them during pre-season. He was on the bench twice before making his bow, as he went unused for a Copa de la Liga Profesional match with San Lorenzo on 19 December and for a Copa Argentina encounter with Cipolletti on 14 January 2021. Gómez's senior debut arrived just under a month later, with the midfielder appearing for the final moments of a Copa de la Liga win away to Central Córdoba on 12 February; he replaced Luis Rodríguez off the bench.

== International career ==
In July 2017, Gómez received a call-up to train with the Argentina U15s. February 2018 saw a call-up to the U16s.

== Career statistics ==
As of 13 February 2021.

Appearances and goals by club, season and competition
Club	Season	League			Cup		League Cup		Continental		Other		Total	
Club	Season	Division	Apps	Goals	Apps	Goals	Apps	Goals	Apps	Goals	Apps	Goals	Apps	Goals
Colón	2020–21 (Note: Soccerway counts 2020 Copa de la Liga Profesional appearances as league appearances.)	Primera División	0	0	0	0	—		—		0	0	0	0
Colón	2021 (Note: Soccerway counts 2021 Copa de la Liga Profesional appearances as league appearances.)	Primera División	1	0	0	0	—		—		0	0	1	0
Career total			1	0	0	0	—		—		0	0	1	0
