= Pulga Rodríguez =

Argentine footballer

Pulga Rodriguez
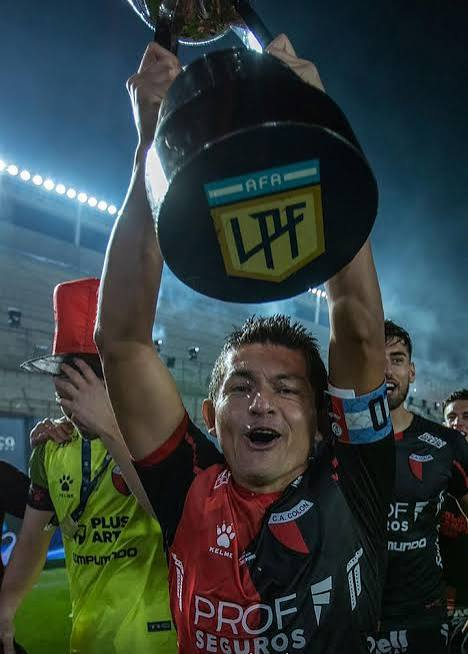
- El Pulga lifting the 2021 Copa de la Liga trophy in his farewell match.

Personal information
- Full name: Luis Miguel Rodríguez
- Date of birth: January 1, 1985 (age 41)
- Place of birth: Simoca, Tucumán, Argentina
- Height: 1.67 m (5 ft 6 in)
- Position: Second striker

Youth career
- 1994–1998: Unión Simoca
- 1998–1999: SS Arezzo
- 1991–2001: Inter Milan
- 2004–2005: Racing Córdoba

Senior career*
Years	Team	Apps	(Gls)
2004–2007	Racing Córdoba	13	(2)
2007–2018	Tucumán	292	(119)
2010–2011	→ Newell's Old Boys (loan)	14	(3)
2019–2021	Colón	46	(13)
2021	Gimnasia LP	21	(8)
2022	Colón	15	(4)
2023	Central Córdoba (SdE)	19	(3)
2024	Gimnasia de Jujuy	16	(5)
2024–2025	Tucumán	13	(1)
2025–2026	Colón	8	(0)
2026	Ñuñorco	?	(1)

International career
2009	Argentina	1	(0)
- * Club domestic league appearances and goals as of 21:16, 10 March 2026 (UTC)

Luis Miguel "Pulga" Rodríguez, (born 1 January 1985) is an Argentine former professional footballer who played as a forward. Known for being a specialist in reading the game, finishing with chipped balls, and scoring from set pieces, Rodríguez played for 8 clubs in his native Argentina, best known for his 11 years at Atlético Tucumán, where he made 292 league appearances and is second in the club's all-time top scorer list, and his three spells with Colón, with whom he won the 2021 Copa de la Liga Profesional, a tournament where he also finished top scorer and was named best overall player.

On 14 June 2026, Rodriguez retired from professional football at Colón's Estadio Brigadier General Estanislao López in a testimonial dubbed El Último Baile (The Last Dance), after he which he moved into amateur football, joining Ñuñorco of the Liga Tucumana de Fútbol.

== Career ==
El Pulga was a key player for the Atlético Tucumán team that obtained in two years the promotion from the Torneo Argentino A (regionalized third division) to the Argentine Primera División (first division). On 11 June 2010 the 25-year-old forward left Atlético Tucumán and joined on loan to Newell's Old Boys.

== International career ==
In 2009 Argentine national team's coach Diego Maradona surprised the media by calling Luis Rodríguez for a friendly match against Ghana. The team was formed exclusively by players of the Argentine league.

== Honours ==
Atlético Tucumán

- Torneo Argentino A: 2007–08
- Primera B Nacional: 2008–09, 2015
- Copa Argentina runner-up: 2016-17

Colón

- Copa de la Liga Profesional: 2021
- Copa Sudamericana runner-up: 2019

Individual

- Primera B Nacional Top scorer: 2008–09, 2012–13
- Copa Argentina Team of the Tournament (Team B): 2016-17
- Copa Sudamericana Top scorer: 2017
- Copa Sudamericana Team of the Tournament: 2019
- Copa de la Liga Profesional Top scorer: 2020, 2021
- Copa de la Liga Profesional's Best Player: 2021
