= David Martínez (footballer, born 1998) =

Footballer (born 1998)

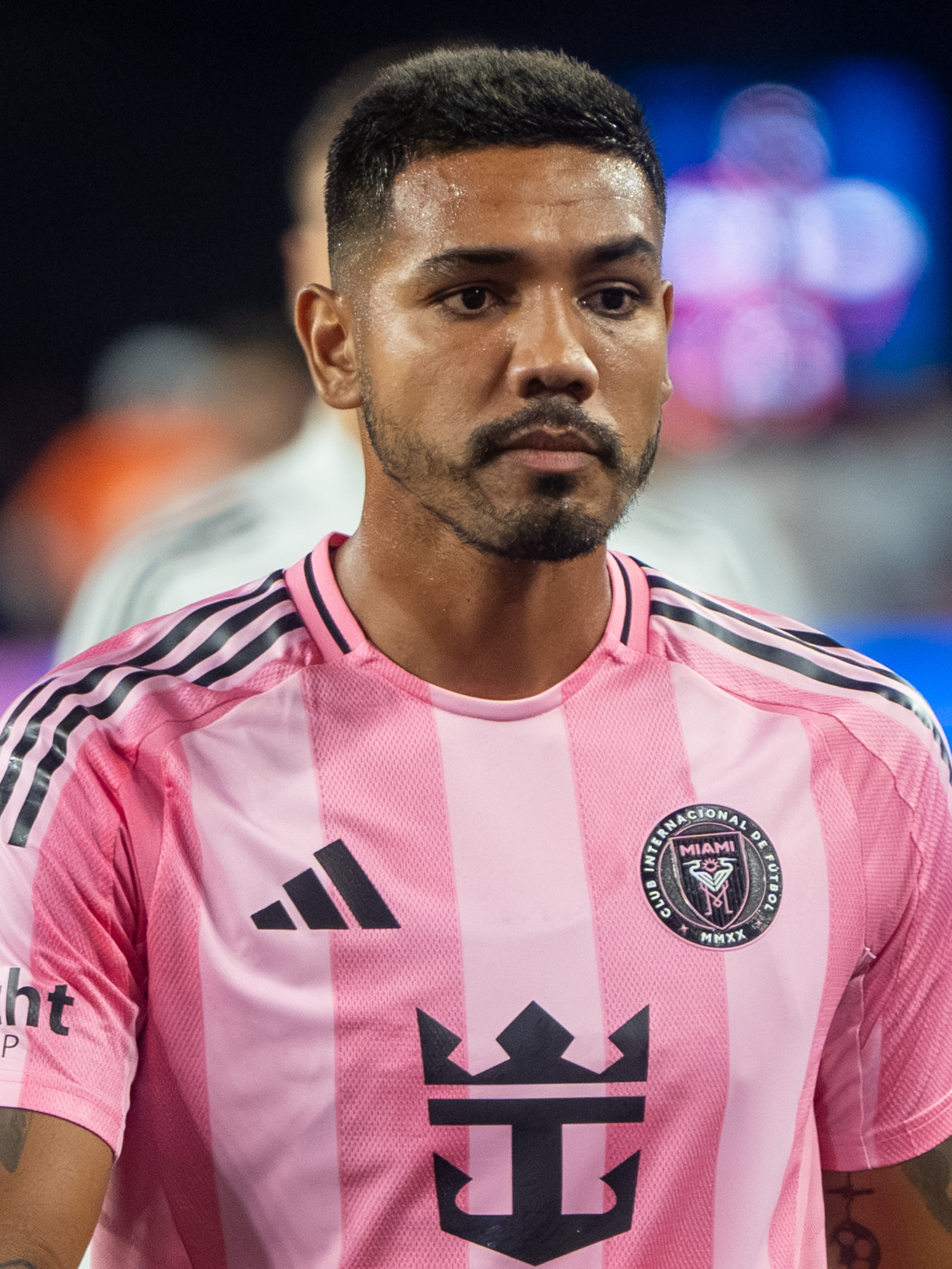
- Martínez with Inter Miami in 2025

Personal information
- Full name: Héctor David Martínez Corral
- Date of birth: 21 January 1998 (age 28)
- Place of birth: Buenos Aires, Argentina
- Height: 1.85 m (6 ft 1 in)
- Position: Centre-back

Team information
- Current team: Defensa y Justicia (on loan from River Plate)
- Number: 21

Youth career
- River Plate

Senior career*
Years	Team	Apps	(Gls)
2017–2020	River Plate	1	(0)
2019–2020	→ Defensa y Justicia (loan)	20	(2)
2020–2022	Defensa y Justicia	0	(0)
2021–2022	→ River Plate (loan)	47	(0)
2023–	River Plate	5	(0)
2024–2025	→ Inter Miami (loan)	13	(1)
2025	→ Olimpia (loan)	11	(0)
2026–	→ Defensa y Justicia (loan)	21	(1)

International career^{‡}
2015	Argentina U17	6	(0)
2021–	Paraguay	9	(1)
- * Club domestic league appearances and goals as of 17:46, 10 May 2026 (UTC) ‡ National team caps and goals as of 15:53, 27 January 2022 (UTC)

Héctor David Martínez Corral (born 21 January 1998) is a professional footballer who plays as a centre-back for Argentine Primera División club Defensa y Justicia, on loan from River Plate. Born in Argentina, he plays for the Paraguay national team.

== Club career ==
Martínez's career started with River Plate, initially featuring for their youth system; notably at the 2016 U-20 Copa Libertadores, though only as an unused substitute on three occasions. He first appeared in River Plate's first-team under Marcelo Gallardo in October 2017, with the defender being chosen on the bench for an Argentine Primera División defeat away to Talleres. His professional debut arrived on 2 December 2018 during a fixture with Gimnasia y Esgrima.

In July 2019, Defensa y Justicia completed the loan signing of Martínez. Across the next twelve months, the centre-back made twenty league appearances and scored two goals; against Godoy Cruz and Patronato. He also made appearances in the Copa Argentina and Copa Libertadores. Defensa extended his loan in April 2020, prior to signing him permanently in the succeeding August.

== International career ==
Born in Argentina, Martínez is of Paraguayan descent through his mother. Martínez represented the Argentina U17s at both the 2015 South American U-17 Championship and 2015 FIFA U-17 World Cup; winning six caps. He was called up to represent the senior Paraguay national team in June 2021. He debuted with Paraguay in a 3–1 2021 Copa América win over Bolivia on 14 June 2021.

== Career statistics ==
As of 2 September 2020

Club statistics
Club	Season	League			Cup		League Cup		Continental		Other		Total	
Club	Season	Division	Apps	Goals	Apps	Goals	Apps	Goals	Apps	Goals	Apps	Goals	Apps	Goals
River Plate	2017–18	Primera División	0	0	0	0	—		0	0	0	0	0	0
River Plate	2018–19	Primera División	1	0	0	0	0	0	0	0	0	0	1	0
River Plate	2019–20	Primera División	0	0	0	0	0	0	0	0	0	0	0	0
River Plate	Total		1	0	0	0	0	0	0	0	0	0	1	0
Defensa y Justicia (loan)	2019–20	Primera División	20	2	2	0	0	0	2 (Note: Appearance(s) in the Copa Libertadores)	0	0	0	24	2
Defensa y Justicia	2020–21	Primera División	0	0	0	0	0	0	—		0	0	0	0
Defensa y Justicia	Total		20	2	2	0	0	0	2	0	0	0	24	2
Career total			21	2	2	0	0	0	2	0	0	0	25	2

=== International goals ===
Scores and results list Paraguay's goal tally first.

No.	Date	Venue	Opponent	Score	Result	Competition
1.	9 September 2021	Estadio Defensores del Chaco, Asunción, Paraguay	Venezuela	1–0	2–1	2022 FIFA World Cup qualification
Correct as of 9 September 2021

== Honours ==
River Plate

- Argentine Primera División: 2021, 2023
- Supercopa Argentina: 2019, 2023
- Trofeo de Campeones: 2021

Defensa y Justicia

- Copa Sudamericana: 2020

Inter Miami

- Supporters' Shield: 2024
