= Guillermo Gozálvez =

Argentine professional footballer

Personal information
- Full name: Guillermo Federico Gozálvez (Note: Incorrectly called "Gonzálvez" across various media, including Colón's social media)
- Date of birth: 5 March 2003 (age 23)
- Place of birth: Santa Fe, Argentina
- Height: 1.81 m (5 ft 11 in)
- Position: Left winger

Team information
- Current team: Colón

Youth career
- Sportivo Agua
- 2013–2020: Colón

Senior career*
Years	Team	Apps	(Gls)
2020–	Colón	1	(0)
- * Club domestic league appearances and goals as of 03:40, 13 February 2021 (UTC)

Guillermo Federico Gozálvez (born 5 March 2003) is an Argentine professional footballer who plays as a left winger for Colón.

== Career ==
Gozálvez started his career at a young age with Sportivo Agua, before moving to Colón at the age of ten. He was promoted into the club's first-team squad seven years later in mid-2020, under the guidance of manager Eduardo Domínguez; he soon scored in a friendly with Atlético de Rafaela. After going unused on the substitute's bench for matches against Independiente, Atlético Tucumán and Talleres in the 2020 Copa de la Liga Profesional, Gozálvez made his senior debut during Colón's opener in the 2021 Copa de la Liga Profesional versus Central Córdoba on 13 February 2021; having replaced Federico Lértora late on.

== Career statistics ==
As of 13 February 2021.

Appearances and goals by club, season and competition
Club	Season	League			Cup		League Cup		Continental		Other		Total	
Club	Season	Division	Apps	Goals	Apps	Goals	Apps	Goals	Apps	Goals	Apps	Goals	Apps	Goals
Colón	2020–21 (Note: Soccerway counts 2020 Copa de la Liga Profesional appearances as league appearances.)	Primera División	0	0	0	0	—		—		0	0	0	0
Colón	2021 (Note: Soccerway counts 2021 Copa de la Liga Profesional appearances as league appearances.)	Primera División	1	0	0	0	—		—		0	0	1	0
Career total			1	0	0	0	—		—		0	0	1	0
