= Rodrigo Aliendro =

Argentine footballer

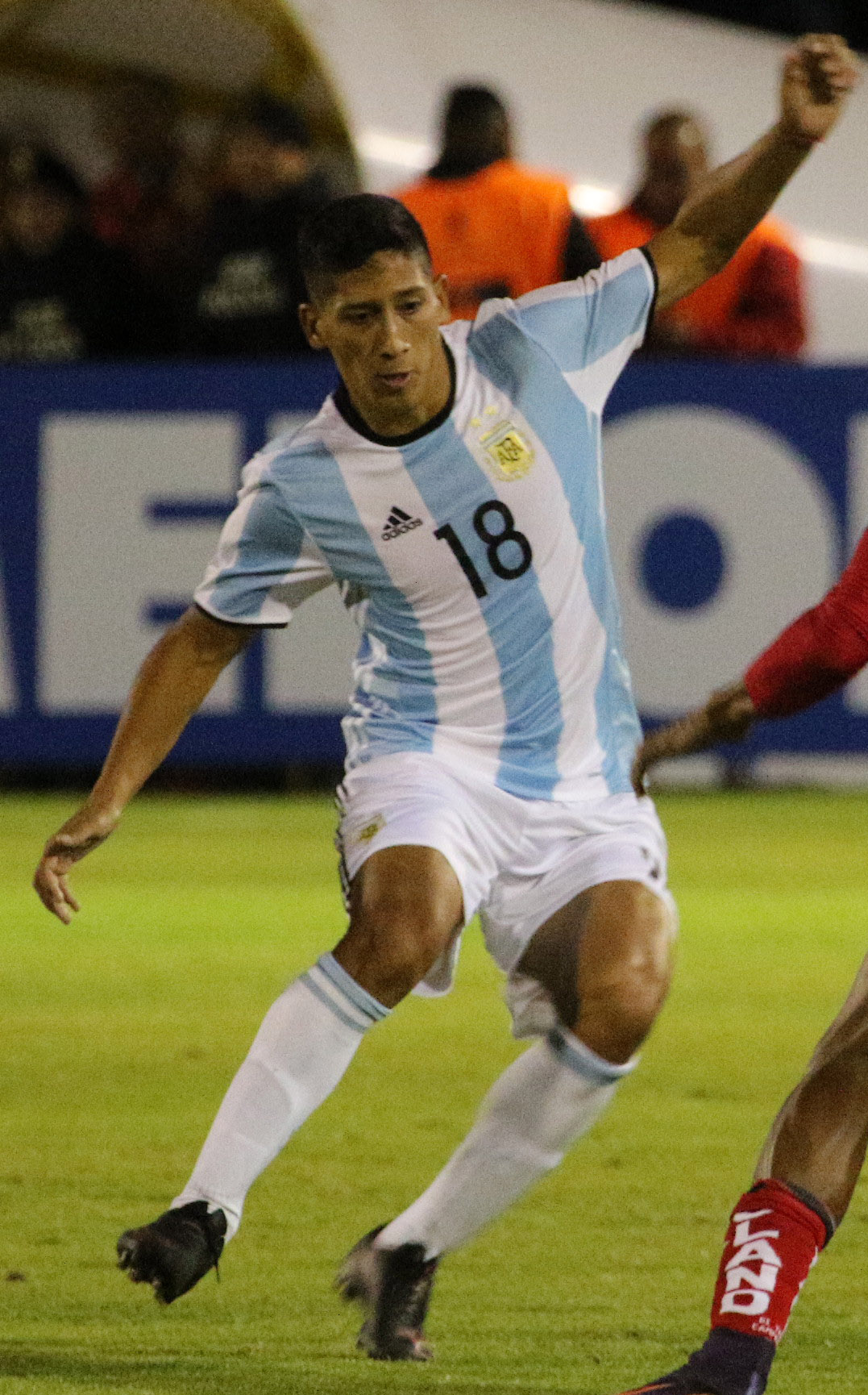
- Aliendro in 2017

Personal information
- Full name: Rodrigo Germán Aliendro
- Date of birth: 16 February 1991 (age 35)
- Place of birth: Merlo, Argentina
- Height: 1.73 m (5 ft 8 in)
- Position: Midfielder

Team information
- Current team: Vélez Sarsfield
- Number: 29

Youth career
- Chacarita Juniors

Senior career*
Years	Team	Apps	(Gls)
2012–2017	Chacarita Juniors	53	(10)
2017–2019	Atlético Tucumán	77	(8)
2019–2022	Colón	78	(7)
2022–2025	River Plate	80	(2)
2025–	Vélez Sarsfield	29	(0)
- * Club domestic league appearances and goals as of 17:05, 16 June 2026 (UTC)

Rodrigo Germán Aliendro (born 16 February 1991) is an Argentine professional footballer who plays as a midfielder for Argentine Primera División side Vélez Sarsfield.

== Career ==
Aliendro made his debut for Chacarita Juniors in a Copa Argentina tie against San Lorenzo on 15 March 2012. His league debut came in Primera B Nacional five days later versus Instituto, another appearance came against Gimnasia in a season that ended in relegation for them. Thirteen appearances and one goal followed in three seasons in the Primera B Metropolitana, ten of those appearances were in Chacarita's promotion-winning campaign of 2014. In the second of those three seasons, Aliendro left to sign for Ituzaingó of Primera D Metropolitana on loan. He scored three goals in thirty-two games for Ituzaingó.

In 2016, Aliendro joined Argentine Primera División side Atlético Tucumán on loan. He made his top-flight debut on 14 February versus Boca Juniors. A few weeks previous, Aliendro made his continental debut in the 2017 Copa Libertadores against El Nacional. Atlético Tucumán signed Aliendro permanently on 6 July 2017.

In June 2019, it was confirmed that Aliendro had joined Colón.

== Career statistics ==
As of 24 May 2018.

Club statistics
Club	Season	League			Cup		League Cup		Other		Total	
Club	Season	Division	Apps	Goals	Apps	Goals	Apps	Goals	Apps	Goals	Apps	Goals
Chacarita Juniors	2011–12	Primera B Nacional	2	0	1	0	0	0	0	0	3	0
Chacarita Juniors	2012–13	Primera B Metropolitana	3	0	2	1	0	0	0	0	5	1
Chacarita Juniors	2014	Primera B Metropolitana	10	1	0	0	0	0	0	0	10	1
Chacarita Juniors	2015	Primera B Nacional	38	9	4	0	0	0	0	0	42	9
Chacarita Juniors	Total		53	10	7	1	0	0	0	0	60	11
Atlético Tucumán	2016	Argentine Primera División	8	3	0	0	0	0	0	0	8	3
Atlético Tucumán	2016–17	Argentine Primera División	27	0	6	1	0	0	13 (Note: Nine Appearances in the Copa Libertadores, Four Appearances in the Copa Sudamericana)	1	46	2
Atlético Tucumán	2017–18	Argentine Primera División	20	1	3	0	0	0	10 (Note: Appearances in the Copa Libertadores)	0	33	1
Atlético Tucumán	2018–19	Argentine Primera División	22	4	1	0	0	0	6 (Note: Appearances in the Trofeo de Campeones de la Superliga Argentina)	0	29	4
Atlético Tucumán	Total		77	8	10	1	0	0	29	1	116	10
Colón	2018–19	Argentine Primera División	0	0	2	0	0	0	8 (Note: Appearances in the Copa Sudamericana)	0	10	0
Colón	2019–20	Argentine Primera División	11	1	1	1	11	0	1	0	24	2
Colón	2021	Argentine Primera División	23	4	0	0	15	2	1	0	39	6
Colón	2022	Argentine Primera División	4	0	2	0	14	0	6	0	26	0
Colón	Total		38	5	5	1	40	2	16	0	96	8
River Plate	2022	Argentine Primera División	11	0	2	0	0	0	2	0	15	0
River Plate	2023	Argentine Primera División	4	0	1	0	0	0	0	0	5	0
River Plate	Total		15	0	3	0	0	0	2	0	20	0
Career totals			183	34	25	3	40	2	47	1	295	29

== Honours ==
Club Atlético Colón

- Copa de la Liga Profesional: 2021
- Copa Sudamericana runner-up: 2019
- Trofeo de Campeones de la Liga Profesional runner-up: 2021

River Plate

- Primera División: 2023
- Supercopa Argentina: 2023
- Trofeo de Campeones de la Liga Profesional: 2023

=== Individual ===
- Argentine Primera División Team of the Season: 2023
