= Guillermo González Regalado =

Spanish actor and businessperson (1945–2020)

- Died: 30 June 2020; Madrid

Guillermo José Manuel González Regalado, or better known as Guillermo Fantástico González (8 July 1945 – 30 June 2020), was a Spanish-Venezuelan presenter, actor and businessman. He stood out with the program ¿Cuánto vale el show? broadcast on television in Venezuela in 1980 and for his opposition to the Chávez regime.

In addition to his career as a presenter and businessman, he was the first independent producer in Venezuela. He produced and directed television series between 1964 and 1976. As the owner of different companies in the world of communication, he managed the Videofilm International rights management company located in Panama.

== Biography ==
González was born in Las Palmas de Gran Canaria on June 8, 1945. He lived in Santiago del Teide until the age of five and emigrated with his parents to Venezuela. He lived in Caracas and studied high school until 1963. He entered the Central University of Venezuela where he studied architecture. Later, he was awarded a grant to study performing arts at the National Council of Culture and Fine Arts of Venezuela (CONAC).

Later, he intervenes as a theater actor in 1962 with the play El extraño viaje de Simón El Malo. There he is seen by the singer, actor and television producer Héctor Monteverde who hires him in 1963 to work on the telenovela Historia de tres hermanas, in which he shared a cast among other artists such as Tomás Henríquez and Doris Wells. Gonzalez starred as the main protagonist in El derecho de nacer, La usurpadora and the evening novels, broadcast by Radio Caracas Televisión (RCTV) which includes the dramatic series Novela Camay interpreted by Chony Fuentes and La Novela Palmolive with Helianta Cruz, named after the name of the sponsoring products.

He internationalized his career by moving to Mexico, where he collaborated for two years at Tele Sistemas Mexicanos, a company later known as Televisa. There he made friends with Emilio Azcárraga Vidaurreta and with the film director Alfonso Arau. González received the award for Best Prospecting Actor in 1967.

He returned to Venezuela and continued working at RCTV where he produced, wrote, directed and acted in the different dramatic spaces of the channel. In 1976, RCTV selected him to host the game show for high school students Viva La Juventud where he made his debut as an entertainer initially alongside the singer and actress Raquel Castaños and later alongside entertainer and actress Carmen Victoria Pérez. González made a Saturday marathon variety program on RCTV in 1979 and created the show ¿Cuánto vale el show?, which appeared for the first time on screen in 1980. The show appears as a contest, in which contestants such as singers, musicians, dancers competed in front of a qualifying jury. Among the singers who participated in the program includes José Luis Rodríguez.

In 1974 and 1977, along with his work on television, he acquired the Chacaíto I theater and the Chacaíto II theater, the two most important commercial theaters for comedy activity in Venezuela. For ten years, González developed the history of commercial theater in Venezuela, directing, writing, producing and acting in almost all the plays presented. He finished the season on RCTV and founded Televen.
