= Santa Lucía, Tucumán =

Coordinates: 27°06′S 65°31′W

Santa Lucía (Tucumán)
- Interactive map of Santa Lucía (Tucumán)
- Country: Argentina
- Province: Tucumán Province
- Time zone: UTC−3 (ART)

Santa Lucía is a settlement in Tucumán Province in northern Argentina.
