= Facundo Garcés =

Argentine footballer (born 1999)

Personal information
- Full name: Facundo Tomás Garcés
- Date of birth: 5 September 1999 (age 27)
- Place of birth: Santa Fe, Argentina
- Height: 1.91 m (6 ft 3 in)
- Position: Centre-back

Team information
- Current team: Alavés
- Number: 5

Youth career
- Club El Quillá
- Colón

Senior career*
Years	Team	Apps	(Gls)
2020–2024	Colón	116	(3)
2025–	Alavés	20	(0)

International career^{‡}
2025	Malaysia	2	(0)
- * Club domestic league appearances and goals as of 11 September 2026 ‡ National team caps and goals as of 6 September 2025

Facundo Tomás Garcés (born 5 September 1999) is an Argentine professional footballer who plays as a centre-back for La Liga club Deportivo Alavés. He played for the Malaysia national team twice; however, fraudulent documents were used, claiming his grandmother had been born in Malaysia, and he was handed a year long suspension by FIFA in September 2025.

== Club career ==
=== Colón ===
Garcés played for Club El Quillá at youth level. He first made the senior teamsheet for Colón in May 2017 for a Primera División match as an unused substitute. Garcés soon headed back to the reserves, before returning to the senior bench in April and May 2019 – though again he would not make an appearance versus Gimnasia y Esgrima or, in the Copa Sudamericana, River Plate. He went unused a further seven times, before belatedly making his debut – as a starter – in a Copa de la Liga Profesional win over Central Córdoba on 4 December 2020.

=== Alavés ===
On 3 August 2024, Spanish side Deportivo Alavés agreed a pre-contract with Garcés, effective from 1 January 2025; he signed a three-and-a-half-year deal with the club. He made his La Liga debut for the club in a match against RCD Mallorca on 2 March. Following his sanction by FIFA in September, Alavés suspended Garcés, but expressed their support for him.

== International career ==
Garcés was called up to the Malaysia training camp ahead of the closed-door friendly match against Cape Verde and the 2027 AFC Asian Cup qualification match against Vietnam in June 2025. He made his international debut on 10 June in the match against Vietnam at the Bukit Jalil National Stadium.

Garcés was among the seven Malaysian heritage players sanctioned by FIFA on 26 September 2025. The disciplinary committee found that the Football Association of Malaysia used fake documents to field the players in the match against Vietnam on 10 June.

== Personal life ==
Born in Argentina, Garcés claimed to be of Malaysian descent through his grandmother. On 2 June 2025, he officially obtained Malaysian citizenship. However, FIFA released a statement that his grandmother was not born in nor has Malaysian ancestry, as the documentation submitted by Football Association of Malaysia was proven to be doctored.

== Career statistics ==
=== Club ===
As of match played 27 February 2026

Appearances and goals by club, season and competition
Club	Season	League			National cup (Note: Includes Copa Argentina)		Continental		Other		Total	
Club	Season	Division	Apps	Goals	Apps	Goals	Apps	Goals	Apps	Goals	Apps	Goals
Colón	2020–21	Primera División	4 (Note: Soccerway counts Copa de la Liga Profesional appearances as league appearances.)	0	1	0	—		—		5	0
Colón	2021	Primera División	37	0	0	0	—		—		37	0
Colón	2022	Primera División	34	2	1	0	8 (Note: Appearances in Copa Libertadores)	0	—		43	2
Colón	2023	Primera División	41	1	3	0	—		—		44	1
Colón	2024	Primera División	0	0	0	0	—		—		0	0
Colón	Total		116	3	5	0	8	0	0	0	129	3
Alavés	2024–25	La Liga	10	0	—		—		—		10	0
Alavés	2025–26	La Liga	10	0	0	0	—		—		10	0
Alavés	Total		20	0	0	0	—		—		20	0
Career total			136	3	5	0	8	0	0	0	149	3

=== International ===
Appearances and goals by national team and year
National team	Year	Apps	Goals
Malaysia	2025	2	0
Total		2	0

== Honours ==
Colón

- Copa de la Liga Profesional: 2021
