= Santa Rosa y Los Rojo =

Coordinates: 27°13′S 65°31′W

- Interactive map of Santa Rosa y Los Rojo
- Country: Argentina
- Province: Tucumán Province
- Time zone: UTC−3 (ART)

Santa Rosa y Los Rojo is a settlement in Tucumán Province in northern Argentina.
