= Monteros =

- Town
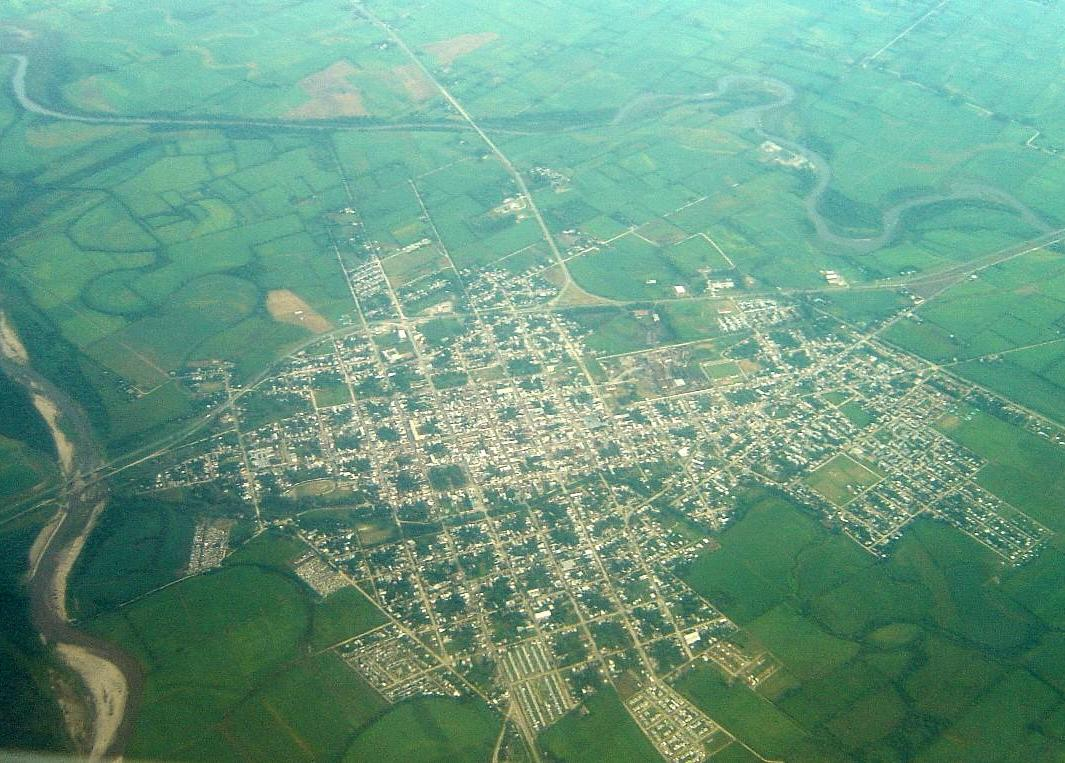
- Aerial view of Monteros

- Location of Monteros in Argentina
- Coordinates: 27°10′S 65°30′W
- Country: Argentina
- Province: Tucumán
- Department: Monteros

Government
  - Intendant: Francisco Serra (AR)

Population (2010 census)
  - Total: 23,274
- Time zone: UTC−3 (ART)
- CPA base: T4142
- Dialing code: +54 3863

Monteros is the head town of the Monteros Department in Tucumán Province, Argentina. It is 58 km (36 mi) south-west of the provincial capital San Miguel de Tucumán, at an altitude of 532 m (1,745 ft), and is surrounded by four rivers. It had 23,771 inhabitants at the 2001 census [INDEC]. The average temperature is 35 °C (95 °F) in summer and 10 °C (50 °F) in winter, with a high of 45 °C (113 °F) and a low of −3 °C (27 °F).

== History ==
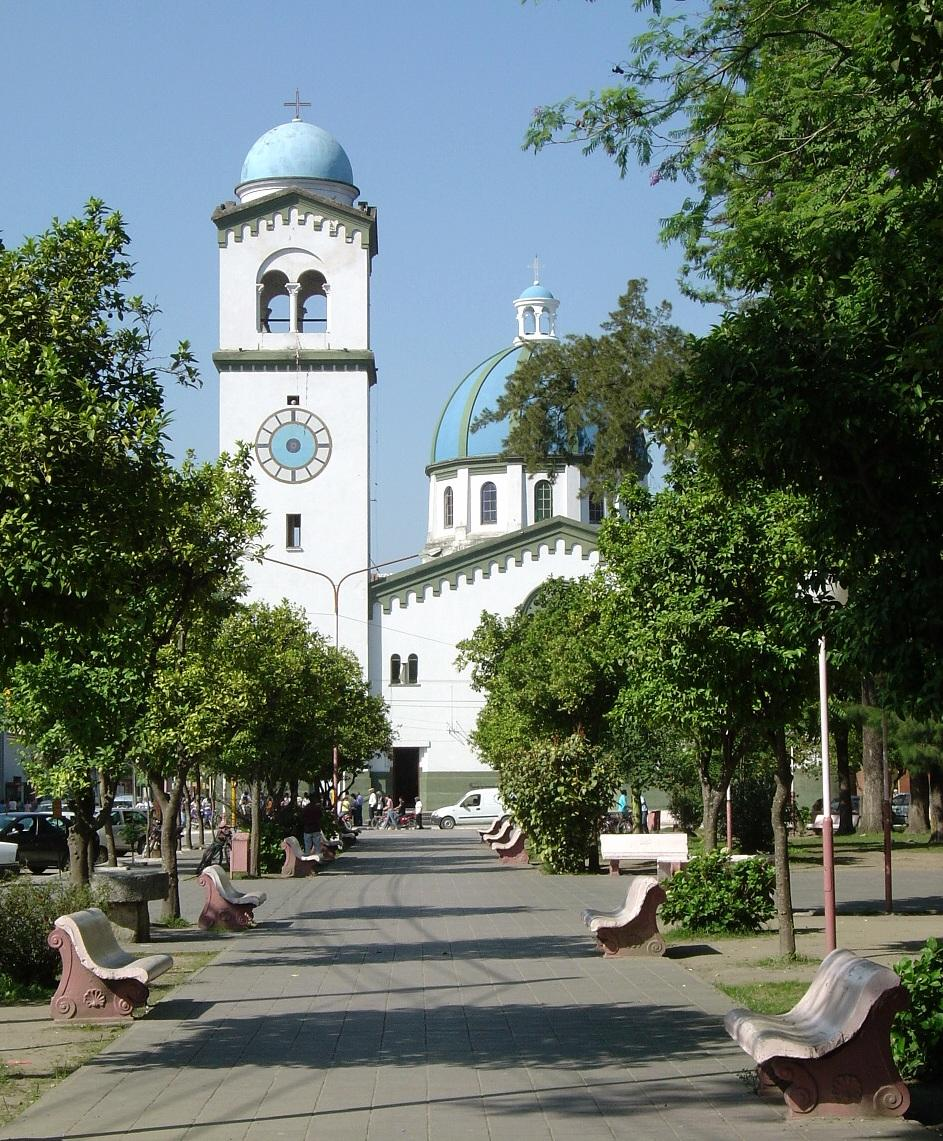
Main square and Our Lady of the Rosary Church.

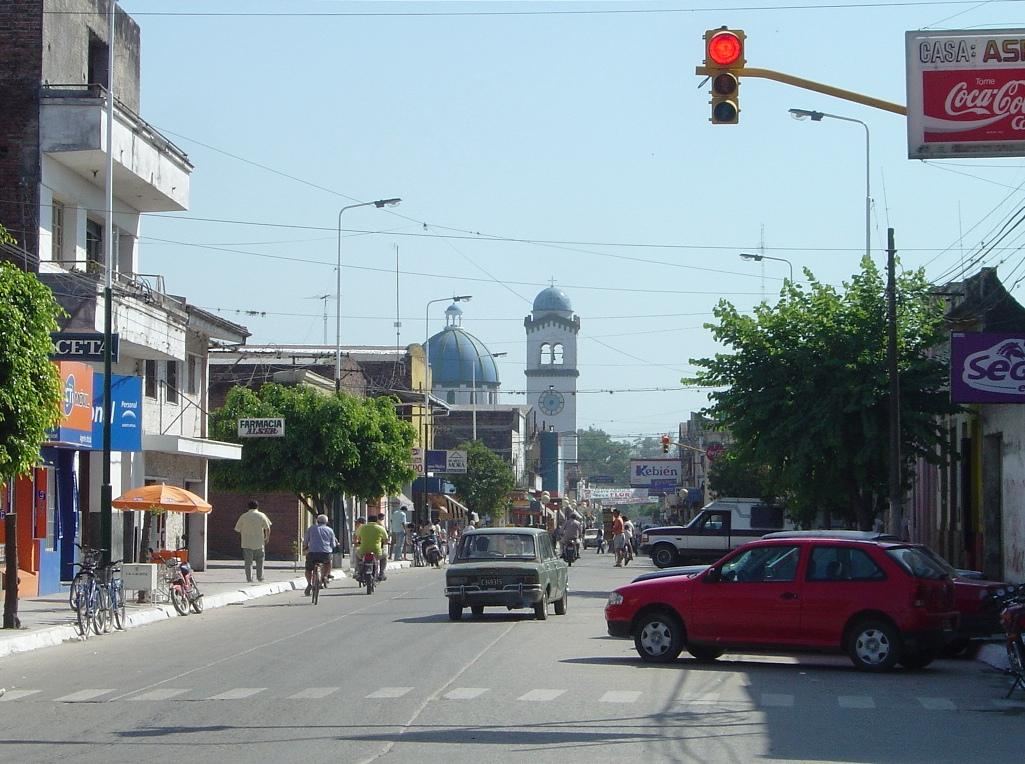
Cristóbal Colón, main commercial city street.

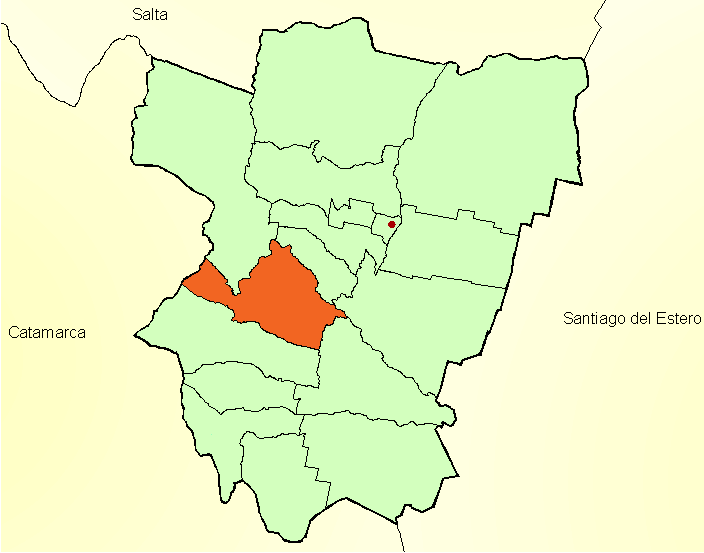

The small village of Monteros was in an area acquired the military governor Don Felipe Antonio de Alurralde in 1754. In 1867 Monteros was declared a municipio and Don Domingo Segundo Aráoz appointed as its first mayor. Monteros subsequently grew in importance within the southern Tucumán region.

== Toponymy ==
There have been several versions about the origin of the town's name. One version suggests that some inhabitants of the old San Miguel de Tucumán, which used to be on a place currently known as Ibatín, refused to move to the new location and declared in rebellion, taking refuge in the nearby hills. The name may have derived from "people of the hill" (Monte in Spanish). Another version says that the remaining inhabitants of the old San Miguel de Tucumán founded Monteros on October 4, 1865, naming it the Town of the Holy Rosary of Monteros. There were three attempts to rename the town. In 1828 and 1832 Villa Belgrano was the name proposed, in honor of Manuel Belgrano but it did not succeed. The strangest case was in 1932 when the then provincial governor, Alejandro Heredia, attempted to rename it to Alexandria, in his own honor.

== Economy ==
The main use of agriculture in the local economy is the sugar industry. The Ñuñorco plant (founded in 1926) is the main industrial plant in the town. The rural areas nearby the town are suited to growing sugar cane, lemons, blueberries and strawberries.

== Sports ==
Club Atlético Ñuñorco is a football club within the town and plays in the regional league Liga Tucumana de Fútbol. The town's volleyball club, Club Social Monteros was founded in 1950 and was champion of the top tier of the Argentine Volleyball League in the 2004–5 season.
