= 2008–09 Primera B Nacional =

23rd season of the second-tier football league in Argentina

Primera B Nacional
- Season: 2008–09
- Champions: Atlético Tucumán (1st divisional title)
- Promoted: Atlético Tucumán; Chacarita Juniors
- Relegated: Almagro; Talleres (C)
- Matches played: 380
- Goals scored: 898 (2.36 per match)
- Top goalscorer: Luis Rodriguez 20 goals

The 2008–09 Argentine Primera B Nacional was the 23rd season of second division professional of football in Argentina. A total of 20 teams competed; the champion and runner-up were promoted to Argentine Primera División.

== Club information ==
Club	City	Stadium
Aldosivi	Mar del Plata	José María Minella
All Boys	Floresta	Islas Malvinas
Almagro	José Ingenieros	Tres de Febrero
Atlético de Rafaela	Rafaela	Nuevo Monumental
Atlético Tucumán	San Miguel de Tucumán	Monumental Presidente Jose Fierro
Belgrano	Córdoba	El Gigante de Alberdi
CAI	Comodoro Rivadavia	Municipal de Comodoro Rivadavia
Chacarita Juniors	Villa Maipú	Chacarita Juniors
Defensa y Justicia	Florencio Varela	Norberto "Tito" Tomaghello
Ferro Carril Oeste	Caballito	Arq. Ricardo Etcheverry
Independiente Rivadavia	Mendoza	Bautista Gargantini
Instituto	Córdoba	Presidente Perón
Los Andes	Lomas de Zamora	Eduardo Gallardón
Olimpo	Bahía Blanca	Roberto Natalio Carminatti
Platense	Florida	Ciudad de Vicente López
Quilmes	Quilmes	Centenario
San Martín	San Juan	Ing. Hilario Sánchez
Talleres	Córdoba	Estadio La Boutique
Tiro Federal	Rosario	Fortín de Ludueña
Unión	Santa Fe	15 de Abril

== Standings ==
Pos	Team	Pld	W	D	L	GF	GA	GD	Pts	Promotion or qualification
1	Atlético Tucumán (C, P)	38	21	11	6	59	30	+29	74	Primera División
2	Chacarita Juniors (P)	38	20	12	6	58	30	+28	72	Primera División
3	Atlético de Rafaela	38	17	11	10	47	39	+8	62	Promotion Playoff Matches
4	Belgrano	38	17	11	10	36	29	+7	62	Promotion Playoff Matches
5	Instituto	38	17	8	13	50	43	+7	59	
6	Aldosivi	38	16	9	13	32	33	−1	57	
7	Ferro Carril Oeste	38	15	7	16	52	48	+4	52	
8	Quilmes	38	13	12	13	39	41	−2	51	
9	All Boys	38	13	11	14	46	46	0	50	
10	Tiro Federal	38	11	17	10	45	46	−1	50	
11	Independiente Rivadavia	38	13	11	14	46	48	−2	50	
12	Talleres (C)	38	13	11	14	49	54	−5	50	
13	San Martín (SJ)	38	12	13	13	46	41	+5	49	
14	Defensa y Justicia	38	11	16	11	47	47	0	49	
15	Unión	38	13	10	15	48	52	−4	49	
16	Los Andes	38	11	12	15	51	57	−6	45	
17	Olimpo	38	10	10	18	39	59	−20	40	
18	Platense	38	9	10	19	37	51	−14	37	
19	CAI	38	8	12	18	35	45	−10	36	
20	Almagro	38	6	14	18	36	60	−24	32	

Updated to match(es) played on June 20, 2009. Source: AFA
Rules for classification: 1st points; 2nd goal difference; 3rd goals scored; 4th head-to-head points; 5th head-to-head goal difference; 6th head-to-head goals scored. This does not apply to determining the champion. If two or more teams had been tied in point at the end of the tournament, a playoff would have been held at a neutral venue within 72 hours for the championship
(C) Champions; (P) Promoted

== Promotion/relegation playoff Legs Primera División-Primera B Nacional ==
The 3rd and 4th placed of the table played with the 18th and the 17th placed of the Relegation Table of 2008–09 Primera División.

Team 1	Agg.	Team 2	1st leg	2nd leg
Relegation/promotion playoff 1
Atlético de Rafaela	3–3	Gimnasia y Esgrima (LP)	3–0	0–3
Relegation/promotion playoff 2
Belgrano	1–2	Rosario Central	0–1	1–1

- Gimnasia de La Plata (LP) remains in Primera División after a 3-3 aggregate tie by virtue of a "sports advantage". In case of a tie in goals, the team from the Primera División gets to stay in it.
- Rosario Central remains in Primera División by winning the playoff.

== Relegation ==
Pos	Team	2006–07 Pts	2007–08 Pts	2008–09 Pts	Total Pts	Total Pld	Avg	Situation	Affiliation
1	Atlético Tucumán	—	—	74	74	38	1.947		Indirect
2	Chacarita Juniors	61	56	72	189	114	1.658		Direct
3	Atlético de Rafaela	68	53	62	183	114	1.605		Indirect
4	Belgrano	—	56	62	118	76	1.553		Indirect
5	Olimpo	75	—	40	118	76	1.553		Indirect
6	San Martín (SJ)	69	—	49	118	76	1.553		Indirect
7	Unión	57	56	49	162	114	1.421		Direct
8	Quilmes	—	55	51	106	76	1.395		Direct
9	Aldosivi	45	48	57	150	114	1.316		Indirect
10	All Boys	—	—	50	50	38	1.316		Direct
11	Defensa y Justicia	57	43	49	149	114	1.307		Direct
12	Independiente Rivadavia	—	47	50	97	76	1.276		Indirect
13	Instituto	43	43	59	145	114	1.272		Indirect
14	Tiro Federal	39	54	50	143	114	1.254		Indirect
15	Ferro Carril Oeste	39	51	52	142	114	1.246		Direct
16	Platense	61	41	37	139	114	1.219		Direct
17	Los Andes	—	—	45	45	38	1.184	Relegation Playoff Matches	Direct
18	CAI	45	51	36	132	114	1.158	Relegation Playoff Matches	Indirect
19	Almagro	49	43	32	124	114	1.088	Primera B Metropolitana	Direct
20	Talleres (C)	26	46	50	122	114	1.07	Torneo Argentino A	Indirect

Note: Clubs with indirect affiliation with AFA are relegated to the Torneo Argentino A, while clubs directly affiliated face relegation to Primera B Metropolitana. Clubs with direct affiliation are all from Greater Buenos Aires, with the exception of Newell's, Rosario Central, Central Córdoba and Argentino de Rosario, all from Rosario, and Unión and Colón from Santa Fe.

The bottom two teams of this table face relegation regardless of their affiliation status. Apart from them, the bottom teams of each affiliation face promotion/relegation playoffs against Torneo Argentino A and Primera B Metropolitana's "Reducido" (reduced tournaments) champions. The Reducidos are played after those leagues' champions are known.

== Relegation Playoff Legs ==
Team 1	Agg.	Team 2	1st leg	2nd leg
Relegation/promotion playoff 1 (Direct affiliation vs. Primera B Metropolitana)
Deportivo Merlo	2–0	Los Andes	1–0	1–0
Relegation/promotion playoff 2 (Indirect affiliation vs. Torneo Argentino A)
Patronato	1–5	CAI	0–2	1–3

- Deportivo Merlo was promoted to 2009–10 Primera B Nacional by winning the playoff and Los Andes was relegated to the 2009–10 Primera B Metropolitana.
- CAI remained in the Primera B Nacional by winning the playoff.

== Season statistics ==
=== Top scorers ===
Rank	Player	Club	Goals
1	(Argentina) Luis Rodriguez	Atlético Tucumán	20
2	(Argentina) Luis Salmerón	Talleres (C)	18
3	(Argentina) Emanuel Gigliotti	All Boys	16
3	(Argentina) Javier Toledo	Chacarita Juniors	16
3	(Argentina) Juan José Morales	Quilmes	16
6	(Argentina) Matías Alustiza	Chacarita Juniors	14
6	(Argentina) Javier Rossi	Tiro Federal	14

== See also ==
- 2008–09 in Argentine football
