= 2021 Copa de la Liga Profesional =

Tournament details
- Country: Argentina
- Dates: 12 February – 4 June 2021
- Teams: 26

Final positions
- Champions: Colón (1st title)
- 2022 Copa Libertadores: Colón

Tournament statistics
- Matches played: 176
- Goals scored: 431 (2.45 per match)
- Top goal scorer(s): Rafael Santos Borré; Luis Miguel Rodríguez (8 goals each)

The 2021 Copa de la Liga Profesional was the second edition of the Copa de la Liga Profesional, an Argentine domestic cup. It began on 12 February and ended on 4 June 2021.

Due to the worsening of the COVID-19 pandemic in Argentina, the President of Argentina suspended all the activities, including the Copa de la Liga Profesional, between 22 and 30 May 2021. Therefore, the semi-finals and final of the tournament were rescheduled for 31 May and 4 June 2021, respectively.

The competition was contested by the 26 teams that will take part in the Primera División during the 2021 season, including the two promoted teams from the 2020 Primera Nacional (Sarmiento (J) and Platense). Boca Juniors were the defending champions but they were eliminated in the semi-finals.

Colón won their first top-flight professional title after they defeated Racing 3–0 in the final. As champions, Colón qualified for the 2022 Copa Libertadores.

Vélez Sarsfield, top team of the Zone B, were eliminated in the quarter-finals.

== Format ==
For the group stage, the 26 teams were drawn into two groups of thirteen teams each, playing on a single round-robin basis. Additionally, each team played one interzonal match against its rival team in the other zone. In each group, the top four teams advanced to the quarter-finals. The final stages (quarter-finals, semi-finals and final) were played on a single-legged basis.

== Draw ==
The draw for the group stage was held on 3 February 2021, 19:00, at Hilton Hotel in Buenos Aires. The 26 teams were drawn into two groups of thirteen containing one team from each of the interzonal matches.

Interzonal matches
Team 1	Team 2
Boca Juniors; Independiente; Huracán; Argentinos Juniors; Banfield; Estudiantes (LP); Colón; Newell's Old Boys; Aldosivi; Arsenal; Atlético Tucumán; Godoy Cruz; Platense	River Plate; Racing; San Lorenzo; Vélez Sarsfield; Lanús; Gimnasia y Esgrima (LP); Unión; Rosario Central; Patronato; Defensa y Justicia; Central Córdoba (SdE); Talleres (C); Sarmiento (J)

== Group stage ==
In the group stage, each group was played on a single round-robin basis. Additionally, each team played one interzonal match against its rival team in the other zone. Teams were ranked according to the following criteria: 1. Points (3 points for a win, 1 point for a draw, and 0 points for a loss); 2. Goal difference; 3. Goals scored; 4. Head-to-head points; 5. Head-to-head goal difference; 6. Head-to-head goals scored; 7. Play off match; 8. Draw.

The top four teams of each group advanced to the quarter-finals.

=== Zone A ===
Pos	Team	Pld	W	D	L	GF	GA	GD	Pts	Qualification
1	Colón	13	7	4	2	23	10	+13	25	Advance to Quarter-finals
2	Estudiantes (LP)	13	6	4	3	16	10	+6	22	Advance to Quarter-finals
3	River Plate	13	6	3	4	25	11	+14	21	Advance to Quarter-finals
4	Racing	13	6	3	4	14	12	+2	21	Advance to Quarter-finals
5	San Lorenzo	13	6	3	4	16	16	0	21	
6	Banfield	13	5	5	3	14	12	+2	20	
7	Argentinos Juniors	13	5	4	4	14	11	+3	19	
8	Rosario Central	13	5	3	5	16	18	−2	18	
9	Central Córdoba (SdE)	13	4	5	4	14	17	−3	17	
10	Godoy Cruz	13	4	3	6	18	24	−6	15	
11	Platense	13	4	2	7	12	19	−7	14	
12	Arsenal	13	3	3	7	11	23	−12	12	
13	Aldosivi	13	3	2	8	15	21	−6	11	

Source: AFA

=== Zone B ===
Pos	Team	Pld	W	D	L	GF	GA	GD	Pts	Qualification
1	Vélez Sarsfield	13	10	1	2	23	13	+10	31	Advance to Quarter-finals
2	Boca Juniors	13	6	4	3	22	12	+10	22	Advance to Quarter-finals
3	Independiente	13	6	2	5	16	10	+6	20	Advance to Quarter-finals
4	Talleres (C)	13	5	5	3	19	16	+3	20	Advance to Quarter-finals
5	Lanús	13	6	1	6	18	18	0	19	
6	Unión	13	4	7	2	12	14	−2	19	
7	Atlético Tucumán	13	5	3	5	24	20	+4	18	
8	Gimnasia y Esgrima (LP)	13	3	6	4	15	20	−5	15	
9	Huracán	13	2	7	4	14	17	−3	13	
10	Patronato	13	4	0	9	12	17	−5	12	
11	Defensa y Justicia	13	3	3	7	15	21	−6	12	
12	Sarmiento (J)	13	2	6	5	10	19	−9	12	
13	Newell's Old Boys	13	2	5	6	14	21	−7	11	

Source: AFA

=== Results ===
==== Zone A ====
Home \ Away	ALD	ARG	ARS	BAN	CCO	COL	EST	GOD	PLA	RAC	RIV	ROS	SLO
Aldosivi		1–3	3–0	1–1	1–2			1–2				0–1	
Argentinos Juniors			3–2	1–1	0–0		2–0	2–0	0–1				
Arsenal				0–2	1–1		0–5		0–0	2–1	0–0		
Banfield						0–3	2–2		0–1	2–0	1–0		0–0
Central Córdoba (SdE)				1–1		0–3	1–1		0–1	1–0	0–5		
Colón	2–1	0–0	2–0					2–2				0–0	2–0
Estudiantes (LP)	1–0					0–2			2–0	0–0	2–1		0–2
Godoy Cruz			2–3	0–1	1–0		0–2		3–1		1–6		
Platense	0–2					1–3				0–2	0–1	4–1	2–4
Racing	2–2	1–0				2–1		2–4				1–0	2–0
River Plate	4–1	0–1				3–2				0–0		3–0	1–2
Rosario Central		2–1	2–1	3–1	2–2		0–1	2–2					
San Lorenzo	1–2	1–1	2–1		0–4			1–0				2–0	

Source: AFA
Legend: Blue = home team win; Yellow = draw; Red = away team win.

==== Zone B ====
Home \ Away	ATU	BOC	DYJ	GLP	HUR	IND	LAN	NOB	PAT	SAR	TAL	UNI	VEL
Atlético Tucumán			5–0		1–1			2–2	4–2		2–3		2–0
Boca Juniors	3–1		2–1	2–2			1–0			1–1	1–2		
Defensa y Justicia					3–2			4–0	1–0		2–2	0–1	1–1
Gimnasia y Esgrima (LP)	2–0		1–1				2–4	2–1			3–0		0–5
Huracán		0–2		1–1		1–3	0–0			3–0		1–1	
Independiente	0–1	1–1	1–0	1–0			0–1			6–0			
Lanús	2–1		2–1					1–3	4–2		1–0		1–2
Newell's Old Boys		0–1			2–2	1–2			2–0	1–1		0–0	
Patronato		1–0		4–1	0–1	0–1				1–0		0–1	
Sarmiento (J)	1–2		3–1	0–0			1–0				1–1		1–2
Talleres (C)					1–1	3–1		2–2	1–0			3–0	0–1
Unión	2–2	1–0		1–1		0–0	3–2			0–0			
Vélez Sarsfield		1–7			2–0	1–0		1–0	1–0			4–1	

Source: AFA
Legend: Blue = home team win; Yellow = draw; Red = away team win.

==== Interzonal matches ====
Round	Home	Score	Away
1	Platense	1–1	Sarmiento (J)
2	Atlético Tucumán	1–2	Central Córdoba (SdE)
3	Argentinos Juniors	0–2	Vélez Sarsfield
4	San Lorenzo	1–1	Huracán
5	Boca Juniors	1–1	River Plate
6	Banfield	2–0	Lanús
7	Talleres (C)	1–1	Godoy Cruz
8	Patronato	2–0	Aldosivi
9	Racing	1–0	Independiente
10	Estudiantes (LP)	0–0	Gimnasia y Esgrima (LP)
11	Defensa y Justicia	0–1	Arsenal
12	Rosario Central	3–0	Newell's Old Boys
13	Colón	1–1	Unión

Source:AFA
Legend: Blue = home team win; Yellow = draw; Red = away team win.

== Final stages ==
Starting from the quarter-finals, the teams played a single-elimination tournament on a single-leg basis with the following rules:

- In the quarter-finals the higher-seeded team hosted the leg, while the semi-finals were played at a neutral venue.
  - If tied, a penalty shoot-out would be used to determine the winners.
- The Final was played at a neutral venue.
  - If tied, extra time would be played. If the score was still tied after extra time, a penalty shoot-out would be used to determine the champions.

=== Bracket ===
Quarter-finals
Estudiantes (LP)	0 (1)
Independiente (p)	0 (4)
Colón (p)	1 (5)
Talleres (C)	1 (3)
Vélez Sarsfield	0 (2)
Racing (p)	0 (4)
Boca Juniors (p)	1 (4)
River Plate	1 (2)

Semi-finals
Independiente	0
Colón	2
Racing (p)	0 (4)
Boca Juniors	0 (2)

Final
Colón	3
Racing	0

=== Quarter-finals ===
Team 1	Score	Team 2
Colón	1–1 (5–3 p)	Talleres (C)
Vélez Sarsfield	0–0 (2–4 p)	Racing
Estudiantes (LP)	0–0 (1–4 p)	Independiente
Boca Juniors	1–1 (4–2 p)	River Plate

==== Matches ====
15 May 2021
21:00

Colón	1–1	Talleres (C)
Castro 13'	Report	Fragapane 24'
Penalties
Castro (penalty scored); Aliendro (penalty scored); Piovi (penalty scored); Lértora (penalty scored); Rodríguez (penalty scored)	5–3	(penalty scored) Fragapane; (penalty scored) Retegui; (penalty missed) Pérez; (penalty scored) Soñora

Estadio Brigadier General Estanislao López, Santa Fe
Attendance: 0
Referee: Hernán Mastrángelo

16 May 2021
12:00

Vélez Sarsfield	0–0	Racing
	Report
Penalties
De los Santos (penalty missed); Janson (penalty missed); Galdames (penalty scored); Cáseres (penalty scored)	2–4	(penalty scored) Rojas; (penalty missed) Sigali; (penalty scored) Chancalay; (penalty scored) F. Domínguez; (penalty scored) Copetti

José Amalfitani Stadium, Buenos Aires
Attendance: 0
Referee: Germán Delfino

15 May 2021
17:30

Estudiantes (LP)	0–0	Independiente
	Report
Penalties
Cauteruccio (penalty missed); Noguera (penalty missed); L. Rodríguez (penalty scored)	1–4	(penalty scored) S. Romero; (penalty scored) Rodríguez; (penalty scored) Blanco; (penalty scored) Martínez

Estadio Jorge Luis Hirschi, La Plata
Attendance: 0
Referee: Pablo Echavarría

16 May 2021
17:30

Boca Juniors	1–1	River Plate
Tevez 10'	Report	Álvarez 67'
Penalties
Tevez (penalty scored); Villa (penalty scored); Cardona (penalty missed); Izquierdoz (penalty scored); Buffarini (penalty scored)	4–2	(penalty scored) Montiel; (penalty missed) Angileri; (penalty scored) Álvarez; (penalty missed) Ponzio

La Bombonera, Buenos Aires
Attendance: 0
Referee: Facundo Tello

=== Semi-finals ===
Team 1	Score	Team 2
Independiente	0–2	Colón
Racing	0–0 (4–2 p)	Boca Juniors

==== Matches ====
31 May 2021 (Note: The match originally scheduled for 22 May 2021 was rescheduled.)
19:00

Independiente	0–2	Colón
	Report	Rodríguez 20' (pen.); Pierotti 66'

Estadio San Juan del Bicentenario, San Juan
Attendance: 0
Referee: Diego Abal

31 May 2021 (Note: The match originally scheduled for 23 May 2021 was rescheduled.)
15:00

Racing	0–0	Boca Juniors
	Report
Penalties
Rojas (penalty scored); Melgarejo (penalty scored); Chancalay (penalty scored); F. Domínguez (penalty missed); Copetti (penalty scored)	4–2	(penalty missed) Tevez; (penalty scored) Villa; (penalty missed) González; (penalty scored) Pavón

Estadio San Juan del Bicentenario, San Juan
Attendance: 0
Referee: Darío Herrera

=== Final ===
Team 1	Score	Team 2
Colón	3–0	Racing

==== Match ====
4 June 2021
19:00

Colón	3–0	Racing
Aliendro 57'; Bernardi 71'; Castro 85'	Report

Estadio San Juan del Bicentenario, San Juan
Attendance: 0
Referee: Néstor Pitana

== Statistics ==
=== Top goalscorers ===
Rank	Player	Club	Goals
1	(Argentina) Luis Miguel Rodríguez	Colón	8
1	(Colombia) Rafael Santos Borré	River Plate	8
3	(Argentina) Augusto Lotti	Atlético Tucumán	7
4	(Argentina) Federico Andrada	Aldosivi	6
4	(Argentina) José Sand	Lanús	6
6	(Argentina) Milton Giménez	Central Córdoba (SdE)	5
6	(Argentina) Alexis Castro	Colón	5
6	(Argentina) Walter Bou	Defensa y Justicia	5
6	(Argentina) Tomás Chancalay	Racing	5
6	(Argentina) Jonathan Torres	Sarmiento (J)	5

Source: AFA
