= Bruno Bianchi (footballer) =

Argentine footballer

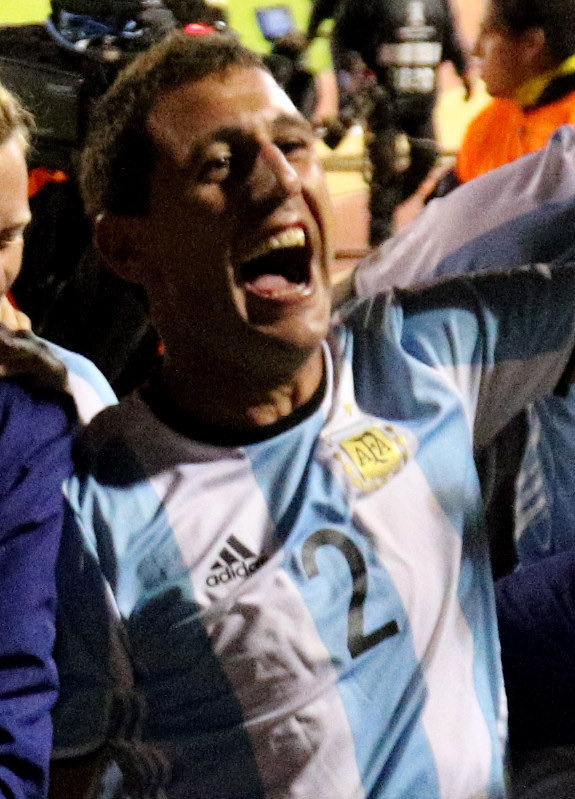

Personal information
- Full name: Bruno Felix Bianchi Massey
- Date of birth: 17 February 1989 (age 37)
- Place of birth: San Nicolás de los Arroyos, Argentina
- Height: 1.83 m (6 ft 0 in)
- Position: Centre-back

Team information
- Current team: Douglas Haig

Youth career
- 2006–2007: Estudiantes

Senior career*
Years	Team	Apps	(Gls)
2008	Universidad San Martín		
2009	Palestino	9	(0)
2009–2010	Lemona	6	(0)
2010–2012	Douglas Haig	67	(3)
2012–2013	Unión	19	(2)
2013–2020	Atlético Tucumán	172	(3)
2017–2018	→ Newell's Old Boys (loan)	19	(1)
2020–2022	Colón	30	(1)
2022–2024	Atlético Tucumán	73	(1)
2024	→ Independiente Rivadavia (loan)	21	(1)
2025–	Douglas Haig	11	(0)
- * Club domestic league appearances and goals as of 16:22, 27 May 2025 (UTC)

Bruno Felix Bianchi Massey (born 17 February 1989) is an Argentine professional footballer who plays as a centre-back for Torneo Federal A club Douglas Haig.

He has previously played for Estudiantes of Argentina during his youth, Universidad San Martín of Peru, Palestino of Chile, Lemona of Spain, Douglas Haig and Unión of Argentina.

== Career ==
=== Club ===
Bianchi's career started in the youth ranks of Estudiantes, before departing to join Peruvian club Universidad San Martín. During one year with the club he won the 2008 Torneo Descentralizado. In 2009, he completed a move to Chilean side Palestino with whom he made 9 appearances for as the team failed to reach the play-offs twice. 2010 saw Bianchi make the move out of South America for the first time as he joined Spanish Segunda División B (third tier) club Lemona, however a year later he returned to South America as he signed for Argentine club Douglas Haig. He stayed with Douglas Haig for two years and left in 2012, but departed as the team had just won the Torneo Argentino A and therefore gained promotion into the Primera B Nacional.

In July 2012, Bianchi joined Unión. He made his first career appearance in the Argentine Primera División on 10 September in a draw with Tigre. After 19 appearances and two goals in the 2012–13 season, he left Unión to sign for another Primera División team, Atlético Tucumán. Between 2013 and 2016, Bianchi has become a regular for the club after making 117 appearances over five seasons in the Primera División and Primera B Nacional respectively; Atlético Tucumán were in Argentina's second tier until 2015 when Bianchi and the club won it to win promotion into the top division.

== Career statistics ==
=== Club ===
As of 17 October 2016.

Club statistics
Club	Season	League			Cup (Note: Includes the Copa Argentina)		League Cup		Continental (Note: Includes the Copa Libertadores and Copa Sudamericana)		Other		Total	
Club	Season	Division	Apps	Goals	Apps	Goals	Apps	Goals	Apps	Goals	Apps	Goals	Apps	Goals
Atlético Tucumán	2013–14	Primera B Nacional	36	1	0	0	—		—		0	0	36	1
Atlético Tucumán	2014	Primera B Nacional	20	0	0	0	—		—		0	0	20	0
Atlético Tucumán	2015	Primera B Nacional	39	1	1	0	—		—		0	0	40	1
Atlético Tucumán	2016	Primera División	16	0	0	0	—		—		0	0	16	0
Atlético Tucumán	2016–17	Primera División	6	0	1	0	—		—		0	0	7	0
Atlético Tucumán	Total		117	2	2	0	—		—		0	0	119	2
Career total			117	2	2	0	—		—		0	0	119	2

== Honours ==
Universidad San Martín

- Peruvian Primera División (1): 2008

Douglas Haig

- Torneo Argentino A (1): 2011–12

Atlético Tucumán

- Primera B Nacional (1): 2015
