= Tomás Moschión =

Argentine footballer

Personal information
- Full name: Tomás Moschión
- Date of birth: 2 June 2000 (age 26)
- Place of birth: Coronda, Argentina
- Height: 1.71 m (5 ft 7 1/2 in)
- Position: Midfielder

Team information
- Current team: FC Imabari

Youth career
- Arocena
- 2009–2018: Colón

Senior career*
Years	Team	Apps	(Gls)
2018–2024	Colón	9	(0)
2024–	FC Imabari	13	(0)
- * Club domestic league appearances and goals as of 09:51, 30 May 2024 (UTC)

Tomás Moschión (born 2 June 2000) is an Argentine professional footballer who plays as a midfielder for J3 League club FC Imabari.

== Career ==
=== Club ===
Moschión started his career with Colón, signing in 2009 from Arocena, with the midfielder moving into the club's senior squad under Eduardo Domínguez in 2018. He made his professional debut on 4 November, coming on as a substitute for Franco Zuculini during a 1–1 draw with Rosario Central in the Argentine Primera División.

In January 2024, Moschión signed for J3 League club FC Imabari.

=== International ===
In June 2015, Moschión was selected to train with the Argentina U15s.

== Career statistics ==
As of 5 November 2018.

Club statistics
Club	Season	League			Cup (Note: Includes the Copa Argentina)		League Cup		Continental (Note: Includes the Copa Sudamericana)		Other		Total	
Club	Season	Division	Apps	Goals	Apps	Goals	Apps	Goals	Apps	Goals	Apps	Goals	Apps	Goals
Colón	2018–19	Primera División	1	0	0	0	—		0	0	0	0	1	0
Career total			1	0	0	0	—		0	0	0	0	1	0
