= Yéiler Góez =

Colombian footballer (born 1999)

Personal information
- Full name: Yeiler Andrés Goez
- Date of birth: 1 November 1999 (age 27)
- Place of birth: Medellín, Colombia
- Height: 1.79 m (5 ft 10 in)
- Position: Midfielder

Team information
- Current team: Llaneros
- Number: 70

Youth career
- Atlético Nacional

Senior career*
Years	Team	Apps	(Gls)
2018–2024	Atlético Nacional	14	(0)
2020–2021	→ Colón (loan)	31	(1)
2022	→ Santa Fe (loan)	11	(1)
2023	→ Deportivo Pereira (loan)	12	(0)
2023	→ Magallanes (loan)	2	(0)
2024	→ Águilas Doradas (loan)	24	(2)
2025–	Llaneros	14	(1)

International career
2019	Colombia U20	8	(0)
- * Club domestic league appearances and goals as of 12 December 2025

Yeiler Andrés Goez (born 1 November 1999) is a Colombian football player who plays as midfielder for Llaneros.

== Career ==
=== Club career ===
In September 2020, Góez joined Argentine Primera División club Club Atlético Colón on loan from Atlético Nacional for the rest of the year, with an option to extend the deal until the end of 2021. Góez stayed at Colón until the end of 2021.
