= Federico Lértora =

Argentine footballer (born 1990)

Personal information
- Full name: Federico Eduardo Lértora
- Date of birth: 5 July 1990 (age 36)
- Place of birth: Mercedes, Argentina
- Height: 1.76 m (5 ft 9 1/2 in)
- Position: Midfielder

Team information
- Current team: Colón

Youth career
- Ferro Carril Oeste

Senior career*
Years	Team	Apps	(Gls)
2008–2012	Ferro Carril Oeste	112	(7)
2012	→ Godoy Cruz (loan)	15	(0)
2012–2015	Godoy Cruz	71	(0)
2015–2016	Arsenal de Sarandí	28	(1)
2016–2019	Belgrano	69	(5)
2019–2022	Colón	80	(2)
2022–2025	Tijuana	30	(2)
2023–2025	→ Querétaro (loan)	36	(6)
2026–	Colón	22	(1)
- * Club domestic league appearances and goals as of 12:49, 17 August 2026 (UTC)

Federico Eduardo Lértora (born 5 July 1990) is an Argentine professional footballer who plays as a midfielder for Primera Nacional club Colón.

== Career ==
Lértora's first career club was Ferro Carril Oeste of Primera B Nacional, he made his debut for Ferro on 18 October 2008 in a league encounter against Los Andes. Two games later, he scored his first professional goal in an away win versus Chacarita Juniors. Between 2008–09 and 2011–12, Lértora made 112 appearances and scored seven goals for the club. In January 2012, Lértora joined Argentine Primera División team Godoy Cruz on loan. He played 15 times during the 2011–12 season prior to making the move permanent in July 2012.

On 7 July 2015, Lértora agreed to join fellow Primera División club Arsenal de Sarandí. 28 appearances and 1 goal followed for him in Sarandí before departing in 2016 to complete a transfer to Belgrano. He made his Belgrano debut on 28 August against Independiente.

On 9 January 2026, Lértora signed a 2-year contract with Colón to return to the club.

== Career statistics ==
As of 10 May 2018

Club statistics
Club	Season	League			Cup (Note: Includes the Copa Argentina)		League Cup		Continental (Note: Includes the Copa Sudamericana)		Other		Total	
Club	Season	Division	Apps	Goals	Apps	Goals	Apps	Goals	Apps	Goals	Apps	Goals	Apps	Goals
Ferro Carril Oeste	2008–09	Primera B Nacional	24	1	0	0	—		—		0	0	24	1
Ferro Carril Oeste	2009–10	Primera B Nacional	35	2	0	0	—		—		0	0	35	2
Ferro Carril Oeste	2010–11	Primera B Nacional	36	3	0	0	—		—		0	0	36	3
Ferro Carril Oeste	2011–12	Primera B Nacional	17	1	1	0	—		—		0	0	18	1
Ferro Carril Oeste	Total		112	7	1	0	—		—		0	0	113	7
Godoy Cruz (loan)	2011–12	Primera División	15	0	0	0	—		5 (Note: Five appearances in 2012 Copa Libertadores)	0	0	0	20	0
Godoy Cruz	2012–13	Primera División	35	0	0	0	—		—		0	0	35	0
Godoy Cruz	2013–14	Primera División	27	0	0	0	—		—		0	0	27	0
Godoy Cruz	2014	Primera División	9	0	1	0	—		0	0	0	0	10	0
Godoy Cruz	2015	Primera División	0	0	0	0	—		—		0	0	0	0
Godoy Cruz	Total		86	0	1	0	—		5	0	0	0	92	0
Arsenal de Sarandí	2015	Primera División	13	1	0	0	—		2 (Note: Two appearances in 2015 Copa Sudamericana)	1 (Note: One goal in 2015 Copa Sudamericana)	0	0	15	2
Arsenal de Sarandí	2016	Primera División	15	0	1	0	—		—		0	0	16	0
Arsenal de Sarandí	Total		28	1	1	0	—		2	1	0	0	31	2
Belgrano	2016–17	Primera División	24	2	5	0	—		4 (Note: Four appearances in 2016 Copa Sudamericana)	0	0	0	33	2
Belgrano	2017–18	Primera División	20	1	2	1	—		—		0	0	22	2
Belgrano	Total		44	3	7	1	—		4	0	0	0	55	4
Career total			270	11	10	1	—		11	1	0	0	291	13
