= Club Atlético Ñuñorco =

Argentine football club

Ñuñorco
- Full name: Club Atlético Ñuñorco
- Nickname(s): La Banda
- Founded: 22 June 1941; 83 years ago
- Ground: Estadio Ñuñorco, Monteros, Tucumán Province
- Capacity: 15,500
- League: Torneo Argentino B
- 2007–08: 8th (of 8 teams) Zone A (Relegated to Argentino C
Home colours	Away colours

Club Atlético Ñuñorco is an Argentine football club located in Monteros of Tucumán Province. The team plays in the regional Liga Tucumana de Fútbol, having also played in the Torneo Argentino A some years ago.

== Titles ==
- Liga Tucumana de Fútbol: 16
