= Liga Tucumana de Fútbol =

Liga Tucumana de Fútbol is a football league based in Tucumán Province in Argentina.

It started in 1977 as a reorganised version of the Federación Tucumana de Fútbol (whose first championship was competed for in 1919) but is now effectively at the 6th level of the Argentine football league system, although prior to 1967 it was the main tournament for Tucumán teams. Between 1967-85 local teams were also able to qualify for the Nacional championship, and then in 1985 the current Argentine structure was put in place meaning the league was effectively demoted a number of levels.

As of 2009 there are 36 teams competing in the league playing in 6 groups of six. This includes the following teams who in 2008–09 were also competing in one of the top 5 levels of the Argentine football system:

Atlético Tucumán, San Martín, La Florida, Concepción Fútbol Club, Atletico Famaillá, Atletico Concepción de Banda del Río Salí, Sportivo Guzmán, Amalia, Unión Tranviarios Automotor, Deportivo Aguilares and Ñuñorco.

In 2012 the four teams qualified for the semifinals were Amalia, Jorge Newbery, Lastenia and San Fernando.

The most successful teams have traditionally been San Martín and Atlético.

== Liga of champions ==
Ed.	Season	Champion
Federación Tucumana de Fútbol
1	1919	San Martín (T)
2	1920	Atlético Tucumán
3	1921	Atlético Tucumán
4	1922	San Pablo
5	1923	San Martín (T)
6	1924	Atlético Tucumán
7	1925	Central Norte (T)
8	1926	San Pablo
9	1927	Atlético Tucumán
10	1928	San Pablo
11	1929	Central Norte (T)
12	1930	Atlético Tucumán
13	1931	Central Córdoba (T)
14	1932	All Boys (T)
15	1933	All Boys (T)
16	1934	Central Norte (T)
17	1935	Atlético Tucumán
18	1936	All Boys (T)
19	1937	Atlético Tucumán
20	1938	Atlético Tucumán
21	1939	Central Norte (T)
22	1940	San Martín (T)
23	1941	San Martín (T)
24	1942	Atlético Tucumán
25	1943	San Martín (T)
26	1944	San Martín (T)
27	1945	San Martín (T)
28	1946	All Boys (T)
29	1947	San Martín (T)
30	1948	Central Córdoba (T)
31	1949	San Martín (T)
32	1950	Central Córdoba (T)
33	1951	Atlético Tucumán
34	1952	Central Córdoba (T)
35	1953	San Martín (T)
36	1954	San Martín (T)
37	1955	San Martín (T)
38	1956	San Martín (T)
39	1957	Atlético Tucumán
40	1958	Atlético Tucumán
41	1959	Atlético Tucumán
42	1960	Atlético Tucumán
43	1961	Atlético Tucumán
44	1962	Atlético Tucumán
45	1963	Atlético Tucumán
46	1964	Atlético Tucumán
47	1965	Sportivo Guzmán
48	1966	No champion crowned
49	1967	San Martín (T)
50	1968	Sportivo Guzmán
51	1969	San Martín (T)
52	1970	San Martín (T)
53	1971	San Martín (T)
54	1972	Atlético Tucumán
55	1973	Atlético Tucumán
56	1974	San Martín (T)
57	1975	Atlético Tucumán
58	1976	San Martín (T)
Liga Tucumana de Fútbol
59	1977	Atlético Tucumán
60	1978	Atlético Tucumán
61	1979	Atlético Tucumán
62	1980	San Martín (T)
63	1981	San Martín (T)
64	1982	San Martín (T)
65	1983	Atlético Tucumán
66	1984	San Martín (T)
67	1985	San Martín (T)
68	1986	Atlético Tucumán
69	1987	San Martín (T)
70	1988	Concepción FC
71	1989	Atlético Concepción
72	1990	Sportivo Guzmán
73	1991	Central Norte (T)
74	1992	Concepción FC
75	1993	Atlético Concepción
76	1994	Concepción FC
77	1995	Atlético Concepción
78	1996	Atlético Concepción
79	1997	Ñuñorco
80	1998	Argentinos del Norte
81	1999	Garmendia
82	2000	Ñuñorco
83	2001	Central Norte (T)
84	2002	La Florida
85	2003	Atlético Tucumán
86	2004	San Martín (T)
87	2005	San Fernando
88	2006	Sportivo Guzmán
89	2007	San Ramón
90	2008	Atlético Amalia
91	2009	U.T.A.
92	2010	Atlético Amalia
93	2011	Sportivo Guzmán
94	2012	Social Lastenia
95	2013	Almirante Brown (T)
96	2014	La Florida
97	2015	Ñuñorco
98	2016	Atlético Tucumán
99	2017	Deportivo Marapa
100	2018	Ñuñorco
101	2019	Atlético Tucumán
–	2020	No tournament due to the COVID-19 pandemic.
102	2021	Unión del Norte
103	2022	Sportivo Guzmán
104	2023	Sportivo Guzmán
105	2024	Sportivo Guzmán

== Total titles won by club ==
Club	Titles	Seasons won
Atlético Tucumán	29	1920, 1921, 1924, 1927, 1930, 1935, 1937, 1938, 1942, 1951, 1957, 1958, 1959, 1960, 1961, 1962, 1963, 1964, 1972, 1973, 1975, 1977, 1978, 1979, 1983, 1986, 2003, 2016, 2019
San Martín (T)	26	1919, 1923, 1940, 1941, 1943, 1944, 1945, 1947, 1949, 1953, 1954, 1955, 1956, 1967, 1969, 1970, 1971, 1974, 1976, 1980, 1981, 1982, 1984, 1985, 1987, 2004
Sportivo Guzmán	8	1965, 1968, 1990, 2006, 2011, 2022, 2023, 2024
Central Norte (T)	6	1925, 1929, 1934, 1939, 1991, 2002
Central Córdoba (T)	4	1931, 1948, 1950, 1952
All Boys (T)	4	1932, 1933, 1936, 1946
Atlético Concepción	4	1989, 1993, 1995, 1996
Ñuñorco	4	1997, 2000, 2015, 2018
Concepción FC	3	1988, 1992, 1994
San Pablo	3	1922, 1926, 1928
Atlético Amalia	2	2008, 2010
La Florida	2	2002, 2014
Almirante Brown (T)	1	2013
Argentinos del Norte	1	1998
Deportivo Marapa	1	2014
Garmendia FC	1	1999
San Fernando	1	2005
San Ramón	1	2007
Social Lastenia	1	2012
U.T.A.	1	2009
