= Alexis Castro (footballer, born 1994) =

Argentine footballer

Personal information
- Date of birth: 18 October 1994 (age 32)
- Place of birth: Buenos Aires, Argentina
- Height: 1.83 m (6 ft 0 in)
- Positions: Winger; midfielder

Team information
- Current team: Estudiantes
- Number: 22

Youth career
- Tigre

Senior career*
Years	Team	Apps	(Gls)
2015–2017	Tigre	38	(8)
2017–2022	San Lorenzo	18	(0)
2019	→ Defensa y Justicia (loan)	23	(3)
2020	→ Club Tijuana (loan)	6	(2)
2021	→ Colón (loan)	35	(8)
2022–2024	Tigre	74	(5)
2024–2025	Nacional	30	(5)
2025–	Estudiantes	49	(6)
- * Club domestic league appearances and goals as of 17:33, 21 November 2026 (UTC)

Alexis Castro (born 18 October 1994) is an Argentine professional footballer who plays as a midfielder for Estudiantes.

== Career ==
Born in Buenos Aires, Castro started his career with Club Atlético Tigre in 2011. He made his professional debut for the club on 30 March 2015 against Defensa y Justicia. He started the match and played 75 minutes as the match ended 0–0. Castro scored his first goals on 7 March 2016, scoring a hattrick against Atlético Tucumán. His hattrick helped Tigre win 5–0.

== Career statistics ==
As of 11 March 2019

Appearances and goals by club, season and competition
Club	Season	League			National cup		League cup		Other		Total	
Club	Season	Division	Apps	Goals	Apps	Goals	Apps	Goals	Apps	Goals	Apps	Goals
Tigre	2015	Argentine Primera División	6	0	1	0	—		—		7	0
Tigre	2016	Argentine Primera División	7	3	1	0	—		—		8	3
Tigre	2016–17	Argentine Primera División	25	5	0	0	—		—		25	5
Tigre	Total		38	8	2	0	0	0	0	0	40	8
San Lorenzo	2017–18	Argentine Primera División	14	0	2	0	—		5 (Note: Appearance(s) in the Torneos de Verano, Copa Libertadores & Copa Sudamericana)	1	21	1
San Lorenzo	2018–19	Argentine Primera División	4	0	2	0	—		2 (Note: Appearance(s) in the Copa Sudamericana)	0	8	0
San Lorenzo	Total		18	0	4	0	0	0	7	1	29	1
Defensa y Justicia (loan)	2018–19	Argentine Primera División	7	1	0	0	—		2	0	9	1
Career total			63	9	6	0	0	0	9	1	78	10

== Honours ==
- Primera División: 2025 Clausura
- Trofeo de Campeones de la Liga Profesional: 2025
