= 2016–17 Argentine Primera División =

127th season of top-tier football league in Argentina

Primera División
- Season: 2016–17
- Dates: 26 August 2016 – 27 June 2017
- Champions: Boca Juniors (32nd title)
- Relegated: Aldosivi; Atlético de Rafaela; Quilmes; Sarmiento
- Copa Libertadores: Boca Juniors; River Plate; Estudiantes (LP); Racing; Banfield; Independiente (via Copa Sudamericana); Atlético Tucumán (via Copa Argentina)
- Copa Sudamericana: San Lorenzo; Lanús; Newell's Old Boys; Defensa y Justicia; Colón; Rosario Central
- Matches: 450
- Goals: 1,024 (2.28 per match)
- Top goalscorer: Darío Benedetto (21 goals)
- Biggest home win: Newell's Old Boys 6-1 San Martín (SJ) (Dec. 15, 2016); Rosario Central 5-0 Arsenal (Oct. 1, 2016)
- Biggest away win: Patronato 0–5 Independiente (Apr. 9, 2017)
- Highest scoring: Newell's Old Boys 6-1 San Martín (SJ) (Dec. 15, 2016); Tigre 4-3 San Lorenzo (Apr. 2, 2017); Racing 4-3 Atlético Tucumán (Apr. 23, 2017); Patronato 3-4 Olimpo (Apr. 24, 2017)
- Longest winning run: Colón (7 games)
- Longest unbeaten run: Boca Juniors (14 games)
- Longest winless run: Arsenal (13 games)
- Longest losing run: Quilmes (7 games)

The 2016–17 Argentine Primera División – Torneo de la Independencia was the 127th season of top-flight professional football in Argentina. The tournament was named in commemoration of the 200th anniversary of the Independence of Argentina.

The season began on 26 August 2016 and ended on 27 June 2017. Thirty teams competed in the league, twenty-nine returning from the 2016 season, and the addition of Talleres de Córdoba as the Primera B Nacional champion. Argentinos Juniors did not take part having been relegated the previous season.

Boca Juniors were crowned champions of Argentina for a 32nd time after rivals Banfield were beaten by San Lorenzo on 20 June 2017. As a result, Boca Juniors qualified for the 2018 Copa Libertadores and the 2017 Supercopa Argentina.

== Competition format ==
The tournament for the 2016 season was composed of 30 teams. Each team played the other 29 teams in a single round-robin tournament, and also played an additional match against its main rival team, named "Fecha de Clásicos" (Derbies Fixture).

== Club information ==
=== Stadia and locations ===
Locations of the 2017–18 Argentine Primera División teams outside Greater Buenos Aires.
Locations of the 2017–18 Argentine Primera División teams within Greater Buenos Aires.

Club	City	Stadium	Capacity
Aldosivi	Mar del Plata	José María Minella	35,354
Arsenal	Sarandí	Julio Humberto Grondona	16,300
Atlético de Rafaela	Rafaela	Nuevo Monumental	16,000
Atlético Tucumán	Tucumán	Monumental José Fierro	32,700
Banfield	Banfield	Florencio Solá	34,901
Belgrano	Córdoba	Julio César Villagra	28,000
Belgrano	Córdoba	Mario Alberto Kempes	57,000
Boca Juniors	Buenos Aires	Alberto J. Armando	49,000
Colón	Santa Fe	Brigadier General Estanislao López	40,000
Defensa y Justicia	Florencio Varela	Norberto "Tito" Tomaghello	12,000
Estudiantes (LP)	La Plata	Ciudad de La Plata	53,000
Gimnasia y Esgrima (LP)	La Plata	Juan Carmelo Zerillo	24,544
Godoy Cruz	Godoy Cruz	Malvinas Argentinas	40,268
Huracán	Buenos Aires	Tomás Adolfo Ducó	48,314
Independiente	Avellaneda	Libertadores de América	52,853
Lanús	Lanús	Ciudad de Lanús - Néstor Díaz Pérez	46,619
Newell's Old Boys	Rosario	Marcelo Bielsa	38,095
Olimpo	Bahía Blanca	Roberto Natalio Carminatti	20,000
Patronato	Paraná	Presbítero Bartolomé Grella	22,000
Quilmes	Quilmes	Centenario	30,200
Racing	Avellaneda	Presidente Perón	55,389
River Plate	Buenos Aires	Monumental Antonio Vespucio Liberti	61,321
Rosario Central	Rosario	Dr. Lisandro de la Torre	41,654
San Lorenzo	Buenos Aires	Pedro Bidegain	39,494
San Martín (SJ)	San Juan	Ingeniero Hilario Sánchez	19,000
San Martín (SJ)	San Juan	Estadio del Bicentenario	25,286
Sarmiento	Junín	Eva Perón	22,000
Talleres (C)	Córdoba	Mario Kempes	57,000
Temperley	Temperley	Alfredo Beranger	13,800
Tigre	Victoria	José Dellagiovanna	26,282
Unión	Santa Fe	15 de Abril	22,852
Vélez Sarsfield	Buenos Aires	José Amalfitani	45,540

=== Personnel ===
Club	Manager	Kit manufacturer	Main sponsor
Aldosivi	(Argentina) Walter Perazzo	Kappa	PCBOX
Arsenal	(Argentina) Humberto Grondona	TBS	La Nueva Seguros
Atlético de Rafaela	(Argentina) Juan Manuel Llop	Reusch	SanCor
Atlético Tucumán	(Argentina) Ricardo Zielinski	Umbro	Secco
Banfield	(Argentina) Julio César Falcioni	Penalty	Plan Chevrolet
Belgrano	(Argentina) Sebastián Méndez	Lotto	Tersuave
Boca Juniors	(Argentina) Guillermo Barros Schelotto	Nike	BBVA
Colón	(Argentina) Eduardo Domínguez	Umbro	Amarras Center
Defensa y Justicia	(Argentina) Sebastián Beccacece	Lyon	Seguros Orbis
Estudiantes (LP)	(Argentina) Leandro Benítez	Umbro	DirecTV
Gimnasia y Esgrima (LP)	(Argentina) Leandro Martini	Penalty	Lotería de la Provincia
Godoy Cruz	(Argentina) Lucas Bernardi	Macron	CATA Internacional
Huracán	(Argentina) Juan Manuel Azconzábal	TBS	La Nueva Seguros
Independiente	(Argentina) Ariel Holan	Puma	Correo OCA
Lanús	(Argentina) Jorge Almirón	Macron	Yamaha
Newell's Old Boys	(Argentina) Juan Pablo Vojvoda	Adidas	Banco Municipal
Olimpo	(Argentina) Mario Sciacqua	Kappa	Bingo Bahía
Patronato	(Argentina) Rubén Forestello	Lotto	Nuevo Banco de Entre Ríos
Quilmes	(Argentina) Cristian Díaz	Lotto	La Nueva Seguros / Quilmes
Racing	(Argentina) Diego Cocca	Topper	RCA
River Plate	(Argentina) Marcelo Gallardo	Adidas	BBVA
Rosario Central	(Uruguay) Paolo Montero	Nike	Banco Municipal
San Lorenzo	(Uruguay) Diego Aguirre	Nike	Banco Ciudad
San Martín (SJ)	(Argentina) Néstor Gorosito	Mitre	San Juan
Sarmiento	(Argentina) Fernando Quiroz	Penalty	Naldo
Talleres (C)	(Argentina) Frank Darío Kudelka	Penalty	BBVA
Temperley	(Argentina) Gustavo Álvarez	Lyon	Secco
Tigre	(Argentina) Ricardo Caruso Lombardi	Kappa	Banco Macro
Unión	(Argentina) Eduardo Magnín	TBS	OSPAT
Vélez Sarsfield	(Argentina) Omar De Felippe	Umbro	Hitachi

=== Managerial changes ===
Team	Outgoing manager	Manner of departure	Date of vacancy	Replaced by	Date of appointment
Pre-season changes
Independiente	(Argentina) Fernando Berón	Replaced	May 21, 2016	(Argentina) Gabriel Milito	May 22, 2016
Belgrano	(Argentina) Ricardo Zielinski	Mutual agreement	May 25, 2016	(Argentina) Esteban González	June 1, 2016
Sarmiento	(Argentina) Ricardo Caruso Lombardi	End of contract	May 27, 2016	(Argentina) Gabriel Schürrer	June 4, 2016
San Lorenzo	(Argentina) Pablo Guede	Resigned	June 15, 2016	(Uruguay) Diego Aguirre	June 20, 2016
Temperley	(Argentina) Gustavo Álvarez	Replaced	June 15, 2016	(Argentina) Carlos Mayor	June 15, 2016
Colón	(Argentina) Ricardo Johansen	Replaced	June 16, 2016	(Uruguay) Paolo Montero	June 16, 2016
Racing	(Argentina) Facundo Sava	Sacked	August 16, 2016	(Argentina) Claudio Úbeda ^{1}	August 16, 2016
Tournament changes
Racing	(Argentina) Claudio Úbeda	Replaced	August 29, 2016	(Argentina) Ricardo Zielinski	August 29, 2016
Vélez Sarsfield	(Argentina) Christian Bassedas	Resigned	September 24, 2016	(Argentina) Omar De Felippe ^{2}	October 1, 2016
Huracán	(Argentina) Eduardo Domínguez	Resigned	September 30, 2016	(Argentina) Ricardo Caruso Lombardi	September 30, 2016
Aldosivi	(Argentina) Fernando Quiroz	Sacked	November 1, 2016	(Argentina) Darío Franco	November 2, 2016
Sarmiento	(Argentina) Gabriel Schürrer	Mutual agreement	November 1, 2016	(Argentina) Jorge Burruchaga ^{3}	November 9, 2016
Unión	(Argentina) Leonardo Madelón	Resigned	November 1, 2016	(Argentina) Juan Pablo Pumpido ^{4}	November 2, 2016
Arsenal	(Argentina) Sergio Rondina	Resigned	November 6, 2016	(Argentina) Lucas Bernardi	November 8, 2016
Temperley	(Argentina) Carlos Mayor	Sacked	November 8, 2016	(Argentina) Gustavo Álvarez	November 8, 2016
Defensa y Justicia	(Argentina) Ariel Holan	Resigned	November 14, 2016	(Argentina) Sebastián Beccacece	November 15, 2016
Atlético Tucumán	(Argentina) Juan Manuel Azconzábal	Resigned	November 19, 2016	(Argentina) Pablo Lavallén ^{5}	December 4, 2016
Belgrano	(Argentina) Esteban González	Mutual agreement	November 20, 2016	(Argentina) Leonardo Madelón	November 23, 2016
San Martín (SJ)	(Argentina) Pablo Lavallén	Mutual agreement	November 28, 2016	(Argentina) Néstor Gorosito ^{6}	December 27, 2016
Huracán	(Argentina) Ricardo Caruso Lombardi	Resigned	December 4, 2016	(Argentina) Juan Manuel Azconzábal ^{7}	December 17, 2016
Olimpo	(Argentina) Cristian Díaz	Mutual agreement	December 4, 2016	(Argentina) Mario Sciacqua ^{8}	December 23, 2016
Godoy Cruz	(Argentina) Sebastián Méndez	Resigned	December 16, 2016	(Argentina) Lucas Bernardi	December 20, 2016
Rosario Central	(Argentina) Eduardo Coudet	Resigned	December 16, 2016	(Uruguay) Paolo Montero ^{9}	January 3, 2017
Independiente	(Argentina) Gabriel Milito	Resigned	December 17, 2016	(Argentina) Ariel Holan	December 29, 2016
Arsenal	(Argentina) Lucas Bernardi	Resigned	December 18, 2016	(Argentina) Humberto Grondona	December 23, 2016
Racing	(Argentina) Ricardo Zielinski	Resigned	December 18, 2016	(Argentina) Diego Cocca	December 22, 2016
Colón	(Uruguay) Paolo Montero	Resigned	December 22, 2016	(Argentina) Eduardo Domínguez	January 2, 2017
Sarmiento	(Argentina) Jorge Burruchaga	Resigned	December 28, 2016	(Argentina) Fernando Quiroz	January 4, 2017
Tigre	(Argentina) Pedro Troglio	Mutual agreement	March 19, 2017	(Argentina) Facundo Sava ^{10}	March 26, 2017
Quilmes	(Argentina) Alfredo Grelak	Resigned	April 1, 2017	(Argentina) Cristian Díaz ^{11}	April 5, 2017
Belgrano	(Argentina) Leonardo Madelón	Mutual agreement	April 2, 2017	(Argentina) Sebastián Méndez	April 3, 2017
Unión	(Argentina) Juan Pablo Pumpido	Resigned	April 22, 2017	(Argentina) Pablo Marini ^{12}	April 29, 2017
Aldosivi	(Argentina) Darío Franco	Resigned	May 8, 2017	(Argentina) Walter Perazzo	May 10, 2017
Gimnasia y Esgrima (LP)	(Argentina) Gustavo Alfaro	Resigned	May 13, 2017	(Argentina) Leandro Martini ^{13}	May 13, 2017
Newell's Old Boys	(Argentina) Diego Osella	Resigned	June 3, 2017	(Argentina) Juan Pablo Vojvoda ^{13}	June 4, 2017
Tigre	(Argentina) Facundo Sava	Resigned	June 3, 2017	(Argentina) Ricardo Caruso Lombardi	June 5, 2017
Estudiantes (LP)	(Argentina) Nelson Vivas	Resigned	June 12, 2017	(Argentina) Leandro Benítez ^{13}	June 14, 2017
Atlético Tucumán	(Argentina) Pablo Lavallén	Resigned	June 20, 2017	(Argentina) Ricardo Zielinski ^{14}	June 22, 2017
Unión	(Argentina) Pablo Marini	Sacked	June 23, 2017	(Argentina) Eduardo Magnín ^{15}	June 23, 2017

Interim Managers

1. Interim manager in the 1st round.
2. (Argentina) Alberto Fanesi was interim manager in the 5th round.
3. (Argentina) Juan Carlos Pires was interim manager in the 9th round.
4. Interim manager, but later promoted to manager.
5. (Argentina) Luciano Precone was interim manager in the 11th and 12th rounds.
6. (Argentina) Hugo Garelli was interim manager in the 12th–14th rounds.
7. (Argentina) Néstor Apuzzo was interim manager in the 13th and 14th rounds.
8. (Argentina) Juan Barbas was interim manager in the 13th and 14th rounds.
9. (Argentina) Leonardo Fernández was interim manager in the 14th round.
10. (Argentina) Fabián Castro was interim manager in the 17th round.
11. (Argentina) Leonardo Lemos was interim manager in the 19th round.
12. (Argentina) Eduardo Magnín was interim manager in the 22nd round.
13. Interim manager until the end of the tournament.
14. (Argentina) Diego Erroz was interim manager in the 29th round.
15. Interim manager in the 30th round.

== League table ==
Pos	Team	Pld	W	D	L	GF	GA	GD	Pts	Qualification
1	Boca Juniors (C)	30	18	9	3	62	25	+37	63	Qualification for Copa Libertadores group stage
2	River Plate	30	16	8	6	51	28	+23	56	Qualification for Copa Libertadores group stage
3	Estudiantes (LP)	30	16	8	6	46	26	+20	56	Qualification for Copa Libertadores group stage
4	Racing	30	17	4	9	51	40	+11	55	Qualification for Copa Libertadores group stage
5	Banfield	30	17	3	10	42	35	+7	54	Qualification for Copa Libertadores second stage
6	Independiente	30	14	11	5	39	23	+16	53	Qualification for Copa Libertadores group stage (Note: Independiente qualified for the Copa Libertadores group stage by winning the 2017 Copa Sudamericana.)
7	San Lorenzo	30	16	5	9	46	35	+11	53	Qualification for Copa Sudamericana first stage
8	Lanús	30	14	8	8	36	25	+11	50	Qualification for Copa Sudamericana first stage
9	Newell's Old Boys	30	14	7	9	40	30	+10	49	Qualification for Copa Sudamericana first stage
10	Defensa y Justicia	30	14	7	9	31	23	+8	49	Qualification for Copa Sudamericana first stage
11	Colón	30	14	7	9	32	25	+7	49	Qualification for Copa Sudamericana first stage
12	Rosario Central	30	11	11	8	40	31	+9	44	Qualification for Copa Sudamericana first stage
13	Gimnasia y Esgrima (LP)	30	12	7	11	26	24	+2	43	
14	Godoy Cruz	30	13	4	13	34	34	0	43	
15	Talleres (C)	30	11	9	10	35	30	+5	42	
16	Olimpo	30	9	11	10	37	32	+5	38	
17	Atlético Rafaela	30	10	7	13	31	30	+1	37	
18	Temperley	30	10	7	13	30	38	−8	37	
19	Vélez Sarsfield	30	10	7	13	31	40	−9	37	
20	Patronato	30	8	10	12	30	40	−10	34	
21	Atlético Tucumán	30	8	9	13	34	40	−6	33	Qualification for Copa Libertadores group stage (Note: Atlético Tucumán qualified for the Copa Libertadores group stage as Copa Argentina runners-up.)
22	San Martín (SJ)	30	7	12	11	27	40	−13	33	
23	Unión	30	8	8	14	25	39	−14	32	
24	Tigre	30	8	7	15	33	43	−10	31	
25	Huracán	30	6	11	13	23	30	−7	29	
26	Sarmiento	30	7	7	16	31	51	−20	28	
27	Arsenal	30	7	6	17	27	50	−23	27	
28	Belgrano	30	5	11	14	21	34	−13	26	
29	Quilmes	30	6	7	17	18	43	−25	25	
30	Aldosivi	30	5	10	15	15	40	−25	25	

Source: AFA
(C) Champions
Notes:

2016–17 Argentine Primera División champion

32nd title

== Results ==
Teams play every other team once (either at home or away), and play one additional round against their local derby rival (or assigned match by AFA if a club doesn't have derby), completing a total of 30 rounds.

Home \ Away	ALD	ARS	ATR	ATU	BAN	BEL	BOC	COL	DYJ	EST	GLP	GOD	HUR	IND	LAN	NOB	OLI	PAT	QUI	RAC	RIV	RCE	SLO	SMA	SAR	TAL	TEM	TIG	UNI	VEL
Aldosivi		2–1	1–0		1–3		0–4	0–2	0–0	1–4			0–3	0–0		0–3	0–3	1–1						1–2		2–1				0–0
Arsenal			1–2	1–3	1–3						2–2	1–2		0–2	0–2	0–1	1–0				2–2		1–3	0–0			2–0	2–1		2–1
Atlético de Rafaela				1–0		1–2	0–0	0–2	0–1	2–2			1–1					3–0	1–1	3–2		0–0			2–3	0–1	1–0		3–0	
Atlético Tucumán	0–0		1–0		3–0	0–0	2–2			0–2	0–1		0–2						3–0		0–3		1–0	1–2	2–1				1–1	1–1
Banfield			1–1			2–0	0–2	0–0		3–2			1–0		1–0				2–0	1–3		3–1		3–2	2–0		3–1		3–1	1–0
Belgrano	0–0	1–2						0–1	0–1					0–1	1–1	2–1	0–0	1–1	0–0	2–0		0–2			1–2	1–1	0–0			
Boca Juniors		3–0				3–0		4–1	1–0					3–0		1–0		1–1	4–1	4–2	1–3	1–1			2–0	1–2	4–0		2–1	
Colón		1–0		2–2					1–0		1–2	1–0		0–2	1–0	1–2	1–1	0–1			0–0		2–1			1–0		2–1	1–1	
Defensa y Justicia		2–0		3–0	1–0						1–0	0–0		1–2	1–0	1–0	1–1	1–2	2–0		3–3		0–2	0–0				1–0		
Estudiantes (LP)		2–0				2–0	0–0	1–0	1–2		1–0		1–1					1–0	1–0	2–1		3–2			1–0	0–0	3–0		2–0	
Gimnasia y Esgrima (LP)	1–0		0–1		1–2	1–1	0–3			0–0			1–0						3–1		1–3		0–1	2–0	1–0		1–1		1–1	2–0
Godoy Cruz	3–1		0–2	1–2	3–1	2–0	1–1			0–2	0–3		1–0								1–2		2–0	0–0				2–1	2–1	3–0
Huracán		1–2				0–0	1–1	1–3	2–0							0–1		0–0	1–1	1–1		1–1	0–1		0–0	1–0	1–2		1–0	
Independiente			1–1	0–2	0–1					2–2	0–0	2–0	2–1		1–1		1–1			2–0	1–0		1–2	0–0				1–1		1–1
Lanús	0–0		2–0	1–0	4–2		1–0			1–0	1–0	3–0	2–0								1–3		2–2	0–0				1–1	0–1	2–0
Newell's Old Boys			1–0	3–1	0–2					0–0	1–0	0–2		2–4	1–1		3–2				1–0	1–3	2–2	6–1				1–0		3–0
Olimpo	2–0		1–2	2–1	1–0		2–2			3–1	0–0	3–0	3–1		0–0						1–2		1–2	0–0				1–4		0–1
Patronato		4–2		1–1	2–0						0–1	0–3		0–5	0–2	1–1	3–4				2–1		1–1	3–0	2–2			0–2		0–0
Quilmes	1–0	2–2						0–1	0–2			1–0		1–1	1–0	0–1	2–1	0–1		2–3		0–1			1–3	1–0	1–0			
Racing	1–1	1–0		4–3				1–0	1–1		1–0	2–1		3–0	3–0	2–1	0–2	2–0					2–1			1–1		4–1		
River Plate	1–0		1–0		4–1	2–1	2–4			1–1			1–0						2–0	2–3		0–0		1–1	1–1		4–1		0–0	3–0
Rosario Central	2–0	5–0		2–1				0–0	0–0		2–1	0–1		0–0	1–2	0–1	1–1	2–1		4–1						3–3		1–0		
San Lorenzo	0–1		2–1		1–0	2–1	1–2			1–2			2–0						3–0		2–1	2–1		2–2	1–0		0–1		3–2	2–1
San Martín (SJ)			0–3			2–1	1–2	0–0		3–2		1–2	0–1						1–0	0–2		1–1			4–2	1–3	0–1		0–0	2–0
Sarmiento	0–2	1–0						0–4	1–0			2–2		0–1	1–2	1–1	1–1	1–3		1–2		2–2				1–4	2–1	2–0		
Talleres (C)		0–0		2–1	0–0	1–1			2–0		0–1	1–0		0–2	3–1	1–1	1–0	1–0			0–1		1–1					1–2		
Temperley	1–0	1–1		2–2				3–0	2–3			1–0		0–1	1–3	0–0	0–0	1–0		3–0		1–2				2–1		3–1		
Tigre	1–1		1–0	0–0	0–1	2–1	1–1			0–3	0–1		1–1						3–0		0–2		4–3	1–1					3–1	0–3
Unión	0–0	0–1				0–2		0–2	0–2					0–3		2–1	1–0	0–0	1–1	1–0		2–0			1–0	4–2	2–1			
Vélez Sarsfield			2–0			1–2	1–3	2–1	2–1	3–2			1–1						0–0	0–3		2–0			5–1	0–2	0–0	2–1	2–1	

Source: AFA
Legend: Blue = home team win; Yellow = draw; Red = away team win.

== Season statistics ==
=== Top Goalscorers ===
Rank	Player	Club	Goals
1	(Argentina) Darío Benedetto	Boca Juniors	21
2	(Argentina) Sebastián Driussi	River Plate	17
3	(Argentina) José Sand	Lanús	15
4	(Argentina) Mariano Pavone	Vélez Sarsfield	13
5	(Argentina) Lucas Alario	River Plate	12
5	(Argentina) Carlos Luna	Tigre	12
5	(Argentina) Ignacio Scocco	Newell's Old Boys	12
8	(Argentina) Nicolás Blandi	San Lorenzo	11
8	(Argentina) Emiliano Rigoni	Independiente	11
8	(Argentina) Fernando Zampedri	Atlético Tucumán	11

Source: AFA

=== Top assists ===
Rank	Player	Club	Assists
1	(Argentina) Marcos Acuña	Racing	13
2	(Argentina) Cristian Pavón	Boca Juniors	9
3	(Argentina) Agustín Bouzat	Defensa y Justicia	7
3	(Argentina) Rodrigo Caballuci	Olimpo	7
3	(Argentina) Mauro Formica	Newell's Old Boys	7
6	(Argentina) Lautaro Acosta	Lanús	6
6	(Argentina) Gonzalo Martínez	River Plate	6
6	(Uruguay) Alejandro Silva	Lanús	6
6	(Argentina) Carlos Tevez	Boca Juniors	6

Source: AFA

== Awards ==
=== Individual awards ===
Award	Player	Club
Olimpia Award – Domestic Football	(Argentina) Darío Benedetto	Boca Juniors
Premio Alumni – Player of the Year	(Argentina) Lautaro Acosta	Lanús
Premio Alumni – Coach of the Year	(Argentina) Guillermo Barros Schelotto	Boca Juniors
RSSSF Argentine Footballer of the Year	(Argentina) Darío Benedetto	Boca Juniors

Team of the Year
Goalkeeper	(Uruguay) Martín Campaña (Independiente)			
Defenders	(Argentina) Nicolás Tagliafico (Independiente)	(Argentina) Jonathan Schunke (Estudiantes)	(Argentina) Germán Conti (Colón)	(Argentina) Gino Peruzzi (Boca Juniors)
Midfielders	(Argentina) Marcos Acuña (Racing Club)	(Argentina) Fernando Belluschi (San Lorenzo)	(Argentina) Ignacio Fernández (River Plate)	(Argentina) Cristian Pavon (Boca Juniors)
Forwards	(Argentina) Sebastián Driussi (River Plate)	(Argentina) Darío Benedetto (Boca Juniors)		

== Relegation ==
Relegation at the end of the season is based on coefficients, which take into consideration the points obtained by the clubs during the present season and the three previous seasons (only seasons at the top-flight are counted). The total tally is then divided by the total number of games played in the top flight on those four seasons and an average is calculated. The four teams with the worst average at the end of the season are relegated to Primera B Nacional.

Pos	Team	2014 Pts	2015 Pts	2016 Pts	2016-17 Pts	Total Pts	Total Pld	Avg	Relegation
1	Boca Juniors	31	64	20	63	178	95	1.874	
2	Racing	41	57	24	55	177	95	1.863	
3	San Lorenzo	26	61	34	53	174	95	1.832	
4	Estudiantes (LP)	31	51	32	56	170	95	1.789	
5	Independiente	33	54	27	53	167	95	1.758	
6	Lanús	35	42	38	50	165	95	1.737	
7	River Plate	39	49	18	56	162	95	1.705	
8	Rosario Central	21	59	20	44	144	95	1.516	
9	Banfield	20	50	15	54	139	95	1.463	
10	Gimnasia y Esgrima (LP)	24	44	25	43	136	95	1.432	
11	Talleres (C)	—	—	—	42	42	30	1.4	
12	Atlético Tucumán	—	—	30	33	63	46	1.37	
13	Newell's Old Boys	25	40	16	49	130	95	1.368	
14	Godoy Cruz	21	32	33	43	129	95	1.358	
15	Defensa y Justicia	20	32	25	49	126	95	1.326	
16	Colón	—	34	17	49	100	76	1.316	
17	Tigre	26	46	20	31	123	95	1.295	
18	Unión	—	41	22	32	95	76	1.25	
19	Belgrano	25	51	16	26	118	95	1.242	
20	San Martín (SJ)	—	37	23	33	93	76	1.224	
21	Vélez Sarsfield	25	29	24	37	115	95	1.211	
22	Patronato	—	—	20	34	54	46	1.174	
23	Arsenal	26	27	27	27	107	95	1.126	
24	Olimpo	19	36	13	38	106	95	1.116	
25	Huracán	—	30	25	29	84	76	1.105	
26	Temperley	—	30	16	37	83	76	1.092	
27	Aldosivi (R)	—	40	17	25	82	76	1.079	Primera B Nacional
28	Quilmes (R)	12	45	15	25	97	95	1.021	Primera B Nacional
29	Atlético de Rafaela (R)	25	23	9	37	94	95	0.989	Primera B Nacional
30	Sarmiento (R)	—	30	17	28	75	76	0.987	Primera B Nacional

Source: AFA

== See also ==
- 2016–17 Primera B Nacional
- 2015–16 Copa Argentina
- 2016–17 Copa Argentina
