= 2016 Argentine Primera División =

126th season of top-tier football league in Argentina

Primera División
- Season: 2016
- Champions: Lanús (2nd title)
- Relegated: Argentinos Juniors
- 2017 Copa Libertadores: Lanús; San Lorenzo; Estudiantes (LP); Godoy Cruz; Atlético Tucumán; River Plate (via 2015–16 Copa Argentina)
- 2017 Copa Sudamericana: Independiente; Arsenal; Defensa y Justicia; Huracán; Gimnasia y Esgrima (LP); Racing
- Matches: 242
- Goals: 606 (2.5 per match)
- Top goalscorer: José Sand (15 goals)
- Biggest home win: Newell's Old Boys 5–0 Racing (Feb. 17, 2016); Tigre 5–0 Atlético Tucumán (Mar. 7, 2016)
- Biggest away win: Argentinos Juniors 1–5 Defensa y Justicia (Mar. 4, 2016); Unión 0–4 Lanús (Apr. 4, 2016)
- Highest scoring: Unión 3–6 Racing (Mar. 6, 2016); Atlético de Rafaela 3–6 Racing (Mar. 21, 2016)

The 2016 Argentine Primera División - Copa Axion Energy was the 126th season of top-flight professional football in Argentina. The season began on February 5 and ended on May 29. Thirty teams competed in the league, twenty eight returning from the 2015 and two promoted from the 2015 Primera B Nacional (Atlético Tucumán and Patronato). Two teams (Nueva Chicago and Crucero del Norte) were relegated to the Primera B Nacional Championship in the previous tournament.

Lanús won their second title after defeating San Lorenzo 4–0 in the final.

== Competition format ==
The tournament for the 2016 season was composed of two zones of 15 teams. Each team played the other 14 teams in its zone in a round-robin tournament and also played two interzonal matches against its rival team in the other zone, once home and once away. In the end, the winner of each played a final match on a neutral ground to determine the champion.

== Club information ==
=== Stadia and locations ===
Locations of the 2016 Argentine Primera División teams outside Greater Buenos Aires.
Locations of the 2016 Argentine Primera División teams within Greater Buenos Aires.

Club	City	Stadium	Capacity
Aldosivi	Mar del Plata	José María Minella	35,354
Argentinos Juniors	Buenos Aires	Diego Armando Maradona	25,500
Arsenal	Sarandí	Julio Humberto Grondona	16,300
Atlético de Rafaela	Rafaela	Nuevo Monumental	16,000
Atlético Tucumán	Tucumán	Monumental José Fierro	32,700
Banfield	Banfield	Florencio Solá	34,901
Belgrano	Córdoba	Julio César Villagra	28,000
Belgrano	Córdoba	Mario Alberto Kempes	57,000
Boca Juniors	Buenos Aires	Alberto J. Armando	49,000
Colón	Santa Fe	Brigadier General Estanislao López	40,000
Defensa y Justicia	Florencio Varela	Norberto "Tito" Tomaghello	12,000
Estudiantes (LP)	La Plata	Ciudad de La Plata	53,000
Gimnasia y Esgrima (LP)	La Plata	Juan Carmelo Zerillo	24,544
Godoy Cruz	Godoy Cruz	Malvinas Argentinas	40,268
Huracán	Buenos Aires	Tomás Adolfo Ducó	48,314
Independiente	Avellaneda	Libertadores de América	52,853
Lanús	Lanús	Ciudad de Lanús - Néstor Díaz Pérez	46,619
Newell's Old Boys	Rosario	Marcelo Bielsa	38,095
Olimpo	Bahía Blanca	Roberto Natalio Carminatti	20,000
Patronato	Paraná	Presbítero Bartolomé Grella	22,000
Quilmes	Quilmes	Centenario	30,200
Racing	Avellaneda	Presidente Juan Domingo Perón	55,389
River Plate	Buenos Aires	Monumental Antonio Vespucio Liberti	61,321
Rosario Central	Rosario	Dr. Lisandro de la Torre	41,654
San Lorenzo	Buenos Aires	Pedro Bidegain	39,494
San Martín (SJ)	San Juan	Ingeniero Hilario Sánchez	19,000
San Martín (SJ)	San Juan	Estadio del Bicentenario	25,286
Sarmiento	Junín	Eva Perón	22,000
Temperley	Temperley	Alfredo Beranger	13,800
Tigre	Victoria	José Dellagiovanna	26,282
Unión	Santa Fe	15 de Abril	22,852
Vélez Sarsfield	Buenos Aires	José Amalfitani	45,540

=== Personnel ===
Club	Manager	Kit manufacturer	Main sponsor
Aldosivi	(Argentina) Fernando Quiroz	Kappa	Polacrin
Argentinos Juniors	(Argentina) Raúl Sanzotti	Joma	Autocrédito
Arsenal	(Argentina) Sergio Rondina	TBS	La Nueva Seguros
Atlético de Rafaela	(Argentina) Juan Manuel Llop	Reusch	SanCor
Atlético Tucumán	(Argentina) Juan Manuel Azconzábal	Umbro	Secco
Banfield	(Argentina) Julio César Falcioni	Penalty	Plan Chevrolet
Belgrano	(Argentina) Ricardo Zielinski	Lotto	Tersuave
Boca Juniors	(Argentina) Guillermo Barros Schelotto	Nike	BBVA
Colón	(Argentina) Ricardo Johansen	Umbro	OSPAT
Defensa y Justicia	(Argentina) Ariel Holan	Lyon	Seguros Orbis
Estudiantes (LP)	(Argentina) Nelson Vivas	Umbro	DirecTV
Gimnasia y Esgrima (LP)	(Argentina) Gustavo Alfaro	Penalty	Lotería de la Provincia
Godoy Cruz	(Argentina) Sebastián Méndez	Lotto	CATA Internacional
Huracán	(Argentina) Eduardo Domínguez	TBS	La Nueva Seguros
Independiente	(Argentina) Fernando Berón	Puma	Correo OCA
Lanús	(Argentina) Jorge Almirón	KDY	Yamaha
Newell's Old Boys	(Argentina) Diego Osella	Adidas	Banco Ciudad
Olimpo	(Argentina) Cristian Díaz	Kappa	Bingo Bahía
Patronato	(Argentina) Rubén Forestello	Lotto	Nuevo Banco de Entre Ríos
Quilmes	(Argentina) Alfredo Grelak	Lotto	La Nueva Seguros
Racing	(Argentina) Facundo Sava	Topper	RCA
River Plate	(Argentina) Marcelo Gallardo	Adidas	BBVA
Rosario Central	(Argentina) Eduardo Coudet	Nike	Banco Municipal
San Lorenzo	(Argentina) Pablo Guede	Nike	Banco Ciudad
San Martín (SJ)	(Argentina) Pablo Lavallén	Mitre	San Juan
Sarmiento	(Argentina) Ricardo Caruso Lombardi	Penalty	Naldo
Temperley	(Argentina) Gustavo Álvarez	Lyon	Secco
Tigre	(Argentina) Pedro Troglio	Kappa	Banco Macro
Unión	(Argentina) Leonardo Madelón	TBS	OSPAT
Vélez Sarsfield	(Argentina) Christian Bassedas	Umbro	Hitachi

=== Managerial changes ===
Team	Outgoing manager	Manner of departure	Date of vacancy	Replaced by	Date of appointment
Pre-season changes
Godoy Cruz	(Argentina) Daniel Oldrá	Replaced	November 7, 2015	(Argentina) Sebastián Méndez	December 1, 2015
Atlético de Rafaela	(Argentina) Leonardo Astrada	End of contract	November 8, 2015	(Argentina) Jorge Burruchaga	December 7, 2015
San Lorenzo	(Argentina) Edgardo Bauza	End of contract	November 8, 2015	(Argentina) Pablo Guede	December 20, 2015
Vélez Sarsfield	(Argentina) Miguel Ángel Russo	Mutual agreement	November 8, 2015	(Argentina) Christian Bassedas	November 13, 2015
Temperley	(Argentina) Ricardo Rezza	End of contract	November 15, 2015	(Argentina) Iván Delfino	December 16, 2015
San Martín (SJ)	(Argentina) Carlos Mayor	Resigned	November 23, 2015	(Argentina) Pablo Lavallén	December 12, 2015
Argentinos Juniors	(Argentina) Néstor Gorosito	End of contract	November 24, 2015	(Argentina) Carlos Mayor	December 19, 2015
Tigre	(Argentina) Gustavo Alfaro	Mutual agreement	November 25, 2015	(Italy) Mauro Camoranesi	December 21, 2015
Arsenal	(Argentina) Ricardo Caruso Lombardi	Mutual agreement	November 26, 2015	(Argentina) Sergio Rondina	November 28, 2015
Estudiantes (LP)	(Argentina) Gabriel Milito	Mutual agreement	December 5, 2015	(Argentina) Nelson Vivas	December 7, 2015
Lanús	(Argentina) Guillermo Barros Schelotto	End of contract	December 6, 2015	(Argentina) Jorge Almirón	December 8, 2015
Racing	(Argentina) Diego Cocca	End of contract	December 6, 2015	(Argentina) Facundo Sava	December 16, 2015
Patronato	(Argentina) Iván Delfino	Mutual agreement	December 13, 2015	(Argentina) Rubén Forestello	December 19, 2015
Quilmes	(Argentina) Facundo Sava	Mutual agreement	December 16, 2015	(Argentina) Alfredo Grelak	December 21, 2015
Tournament changes
Newell's Old Boys	(Argentina) Lucas Bernardi	Resigned	February 14, 2016	(Argentina) Diego Osella ^{1}	February 22, 2016
Olimpo	(Argentina) Diego Osella	Resigned	February 22, 2016	(Argentina) Cristian Díaz	February 22, 2016
Boca Juniors	(Argentina) Rodolfo Arruabarrena	Sacked	February 29, 2016	(Argentina) Guillermo Barros Schelotto	March 1, 2016
Argentinos Juniors	(Argentina) Carlos Mayor	Resigned	March 4, 2016	(Argentina) Raúl Sanzotti ^{2}	March 6, 2016
Sarmiento	(Argentina) Sergio Lippi	Mutual agreement	March 6, 2016	(Argentina) Ricardo Caruso Lombardi	March 10, 2016
Gimnasia y Esgrima (LP)	(Argentina) Pedro Troglio	Sacked	March 14, 2016	(Argentina) Gustavo Alfaro ^{3}	March 20, 2016
Tigre	(Italy) Mauro Camoranesi	Sacked	March 17, 2016	(Argentina) Pedro Troglio ^{4}	March 21, 2016
Banfield	(Argentina) Claudio Vivas	Replaced	March 20, 2016	(Argentina) Julio César Falcioni	March 20, 2016
Atlético de Rafaela	(Argentina) Jorge Burruchaga	Sacked	March 25, 2016	(Argentina) Juan Manuel Llop	March 26, 2016
Colón	(Argentina) Darío Franco	Resigned	April 17, 2016	(Argentina) Ricardo Johansen ^{5}	April 17, 2016
Temperley	(Argentina) Iván Delfino	Sacked	May 3, 2016	(Argentina) Gustavo Álvarez ^{6}	May 3, 2016
Independiente	(Argentina) Mauricio Pellegrino	End of contract	May 10, 2016	(Argentina) Fernando Berón ^{7}	May 10, 2016

Interim Managers

1. (Argentina) Juan Pablo Vojvoda was interim manager in the 3rd and 4th rounds.
2. Interim manager, but later promoted to manager until the end of the tournament.
3. (Argentina) Andrés Yllana was interim manager in the 8th round.
4. (Argentina) Fabián Castro was interim manager in the 8th round.
5. Interim manager in the 12th–16th rounds.
6. Interim manager in the 14th–16th rounds.
7. Interim manager in the 15th and 16th rounds.

== League table ==
=== Zone 1 ===
Pos	Team	Pld	W	D	L	GF	GA	GD	Pts	Qualification
1	San Lorenzo	16	10	4	2	23	16	+7	34	Championship playoff 2017 Copa Libertadores group stage
2	Godoy Cruz	16	10	3	3	27	14	+13	33	2017 Copa Libertadores group stage
3	Independiente	16	7	6	3	22	12	+10	27	2017 Copa Sudamericana first stage
4	Arsenal	16	8	3	5	21	15	+6	27	2017 Copa Sudamericana first stage
5	Gimnasia y Esgrima (LP)	16	7	4	5	19	19	0	25	2017 Copa Sudamericana first stage
6	Vélez Sarsfield	16	7	3	6	20	19	+1	24	
7	Rosario Central	16	5	5	6	19	16	+3	20	
8	Patronato	16	5	5	6	19	23	−4	20	
9	River Plate	16	4	6	6	21	22	−1	18	2017 Copa Libertadores group stage
10	Sarmiento	16	4	5	7	10	18	−8	17	
11	Colón	16	5	2	9	21	31	−10	17	
12	Belgrano	16	4	4	8	21	24	−3	16	
13	Banfield	16	2	9	5	15	20	−5	15	
14	Quilmes	16	3	6	7	21	32	−11	15	
15	Olimpo	16	3	4	9	11	20	−9	13	

Source: AFA

=== Zone 2 ===
Pos	Team	Pld	W	D	L	GF	GA	GD	Pts	Qualification
1	Lanús	16	12	2	2	28	10	+18	38	Championship playoff 2017 Copa Libertadores group stage
2	Estudiantes (LP)	16	9	5	2	25	11	+14	32	2017 Copa Libertadores group stage
3	Atlético Tucumán	16	9	3	4	26	19	+7	30	2017 Copa Libertadores second stage
4	Defensa y Justicia	16	7	4	5	25	16	+9	25	2017 Copa Sudamericana first stage
5	Huracán	16	7	4	5	21	15	+6	25	2017 Copa Sudamericana first stage
6	Racing	16	6	6	4	29	26	+3	24	2017 Copa Sudamericana first stage
7	San Martín (SJ)	16	6	5	5	23	20	+3	23	
8	Unión	16	5	7	4	24	22	+2	22	
9	Tigre	16	5	5	6	21	17	+4	20	
10	Boca Juniors	16	5	5	6	15	13	+2	20	
11	Aldosivi	16	4	5	7	19	28	−9	17	
12	Newell's Old Boys	16	3	7	6	16	21	−5	16	
13	Temperley	16	4	4	8	14	21	−7	16	
14	Argentinos Juniors	16	2	6	8	11	29	−18	12	
15	Atlético de Rafaela	16	2	3	11	14	32	−18	9	

Source: AFA

== Championship final ==
Team 1	Sco.	Team 2	Venue	City
Lanús	4–0	San Lorenzo	Estadio Monumental	Buenos Aires

=== Match details ===
2016 Argentine Primera División Final
29 May 2016
16:15 UTC−3

San Lorenzo	0–4	Lanús
	Report	Benítez 17'; Almirón 58'; Sand 73'; Acosta 88'

Estadio Monumental, Buenos Aires
Attendance: 52,260
Referee: Darío Herrera

San Lorenzo
Lanús

GK	12	(Argentina) Sebastián Torrico
DF	7	(Argentina) Julio Buffarini (c)	(yellow card) 15'
DF	2	(Argentina) Marcos Angeleri	(yellow card) 80'
DF	6	(Argentina) Matías Caruzzo	(yellow card) 79'
DF	21	(Argentina) Emmanuel Más		(substituted off) 72'
MF	5	(Argentina) Juan Ignacio Mercier
MF	16	(Argentina) Fernando Belluschi
MF	28	(Argentina) Franco Mussis	(yellow card) 34'	(substituted off) 46'
MF	23	(Argentina) Sebastián Blanco		(substituted off) 78'
FW	19	(Argentina) Ezequiel Cerutti	(yellow card) 57'
FW	18	(Argentina) Nicolás Blandi
Substitutes:
GK	22	(Argentina) Nicolás Navarro
DF	3	(Colombia) Pedro Franco
MF	10	(Argentina) Leandro Romagnoli
MF	11	(Argentina) Pablo Barrientos		(substituted on) 46'
FW	15	(Argentina) Héctor Villalba		(substituted on) 78'
FW	9	(Uruguay) Martín Cauteruccio		(substituted on) 72'
FW	26	(Argentina) Mauro Matos
Manager:
(Argentina) Pablo Guede

GK	1	(Argentina) Fernando Monetti	(yellow card) 67'
DF	4	(Argentina) José Luis Gómez
DF	2	(Paraguay) Gustavo Gómez	(yellow card) 54'
DF	6	(Argentina) Diego Braghieri
DF	3	(Argentina) Maximiliano Velázquez (c)	(yellow card) 9'	(substituted off) 72'
MF	27	(Argentina) Román Martínez
MF	30	(Argentina) Iván Marcone
MF	26	(Paraguay) Miguel Almirón
FW	7	(Argentina) Lautaro Acosta
FW	9	(Argentina) José Sand	(yellow card) 74'	(substituted off) 78'
FW	23	(Argentina) Oscar Benítez	(yellow card) 79'	(substituted off) 84'
Substitutes:
GK	12	(Argentina) Matías Ibáñez
DF	14	(Argentina) Marcelo Herrera
MF	21	(Argentina) Nicolás Pasquini		(substituted on) 72'
MF	16	(Paraguay) Víctor Ayala		(substituted on) 84'
MF	10	(Argentina) Gonzalo Castellani
MF	19	(Argentina) Nicolás Aguirre		(substituted on) 78'
FW	11	(Argentina) Pablo Mouche
Manager:
(Argentina) Jorge Almirón

Assistant referees:
Hernán Maidana
Juan Pablo Belatti
Fourth official:
Diego Abal

Match rules

- 90 minutes.
- 30 minutes of extra time if necessary.
- Penalty shoot-out if scores still level.
- Seven named substitutes, of which up to three may be used.

2016 Primera División champion

2nd title

== Results ==
Home \ Away	ARS	BAN	BEL	COL	GLP	GOD	IND	OLI	PAT	QUI	RIV	RCE	SLA	SAR	VEL	ALD	ARG	RAF	ATU	BOC	DYJ	EST	HUR	LAN	NOB	RAC	SMA	TEM	TIG	UNI
Arsenal		3–1	3–3		0–1						2–1	1–0		2–0	1–0						0–0									
Banfield				1–1	2–0	2–3	1–3			1–1				0–0	0–0									0–2						
Belgrano		0–0			3–0					2–2	3–2	1–0		3–0	2–3				0–0											
Colón	2–1		3–0					3–1	2–2		4–1	0–3	0–2																	0–3
Gimnasia y Esgrima (LP)				3–0		2–2	3–3	1–0	3–2	1–0			0–0									0–0								
Godoy Cruz	2–0		1–0	4–1			1–1	1–0	3–1				0–1														1–0			
Independiente	2–0		1–0	4–1				0–0	2–1			0–2	0–1													1–1				
Olimpo	2–1	1–1	2–0								0–1	1–1	0–2	0–1		2–1														
Patronato	0–0	0–2	2–1					1–0			2–1	1–0	2–2					2–1												
Quilmes	1–4			2–4		1–3	0–3	1–1	2–2				3–0															2–0		
River Plate		1–1			1–0	1–2	1–0			5–1				2–2	0–0					0–0										
Rosario Central		2–2			0–1	1–0				1–1	3–3			1–0	2–3										2–0					
San Lorenzo	0–2	1–1	3–2								2–1	2–1		2–1	3–2								1–0							
Sarmiento				1–0	1–3	0–0	0–0		1–0	2–2					1–0														0–1	
Vélez Sarsfield				2–0	2–1	1–4	0–2	2–1	0–0	1–2							1–0													
Aldosivi								3–0									3–2	2–1				1–2				2–1	2–2	1–1		1–1
Argentinos Juniors															0–3				0–3	1–0	1–5		0–0	1–1	0–0				1–1	
Atlético de Rafaela									3–1								0–2					0–1				3–6	1–2	0–2	0–0	1–1
Atlético Tucumán			2–1													1–1		3–0			3–1		2–1			2–1	3–2			2–0
Boca Juniors											0–0					4–1		3–0	0–1		0–0		0–0		4–1					2–1
Defensa y Justicia	0–1															4–0		4–1					0–2			2–1	0–0	2–1		2–2
Estudiantes (LP)					3–0												4–1		3–2	3–1	2–1			0–1	0–0				1–1	
Huracán													1–1			2–0		0–1				1–0				0–1	4–3	4–2		1–1
Lanús		2–0														2–0		2–1	1–0	2–0	2–1		1–3		3–0					
Newell's Old Boys												0–0				1–1		1–1	2–1		0–1		1–0			5–0				1–1
Racing							0–0										2–2			1–0		0–0		2–1			2–2	2–0	3–3	
San Martín (SJ)						2–0											2–0			0–1		0–2		2–2	2–1			2–0	1–0	
Temperley										2–0							0–0		1–1	0–0		1–3		0–1	2–0				2–0	
Tigre														2–0		2–0			5–0	2–0	0–2		1–2	0–1	3–3					
Unión				1–0													4–0					1–1		0–4		3–6	1–1	3–0	1–0	

Source: AFA
Legend: Blue = home team win; Yellow = draw; Red = away team win.

== Copa Libertadores playoff ==
The second-place team in each zone qualified to the 2017 Copa Libertadores and played a match at a neutral stadium to determine at which stage each team entered. The winner of this playoff qualified directly to the second stage (earning the Argentina 3 berth), and the loser entered the first stage of the tournament (earning the Argentina 4 berth).

May 28, 2016
17:00 UTC−3

Godoy Cruz	0–1	Estudiantes (LP)
	Report	Cavallaro 15'

Estadio Mario Alberto Kempes, Córdoba
Attendance: 3,877
Referee: Silvio Trucco

Several months after the playoff, CONMEBOL expanded the 2017 Copa Libertadores from 38 to 47 teams with Argentina gaining one additional berth. So, Godoy Cruz also qualified directly to the second stage and AFA had to choose between the third places in each zone, Atlético Tucumán and Independiente, to determine the team qualified as Argentine 6 berth. Finally, AFA gave the extra berth to Atlético Tucumán by sporting criteria.

== Season statistics ==
=== Top Goalscorers ===
Rank	Player	Club	Goals
1	(Argentina) José Sand	Lanús	15
2	(Argentina) Ramón Ábila	Huracán	11
3	(Argentina) Fabián Bordagaray	Defensa y Justicia	9
3	(Uruguay) Santiago García	Godoy Cruz	9
5	(Argentina) Nicolás Blandi	San Lorenzo	8
5	(Argentina) Javier Toledo	San Martín (SJ)	8
7	(Argentina) Walter Bou	Gimnasia y Esgrima (LP)	7
7	(Argentina) Cristian Menéndez	Atlético Tucumán	7
7	(Argentina) Ezequiel Rescaldani	Quilmes	7
7	(Argentina) Claudio Riaño	Unión	7
7	(Argentina) Marco Ruben	Rosario Central	7
7	(Argentina) Alan Ruiz	Colón	7

=== Top assists ===
Rank	Player	Club	Assists
1	(Argentina) Víctor Malcorra	Unión	8
2	(Argentina) Emiliano Rigoni	Independiente	6
3	(Argentina) Fabián Bordagaray	Defensa y Justicia	5
3	(Argentina) Giovani Lo Celso	Rosario Central	5
3	(Argentina) Fernando Márquez	Belgrano	5
3	(Argentina) Cristian Menéndez	Atlético Tucumán	5
3	(Argentina) Augusto Solari	Estudiantes (LP)	5

Source: AFA

== Relegation ==
Relegation at the end of the season is based on the points per game obtained by the clubs during the present season and the three previous seasons (only seasons in the Primera are counted). The team with the worst average at the end of the season is relegated to Primera B Nacional.

Pos	Team	2013–14 Pts	2014 Pts	2015 Pts	2016 Pts	Total Pts	Total Pld	Avg	Relegation
1	Atlético Tucumán	—	—	—	30	30	16	1.875	
2	San Lorenzo	60	26	61	34	181	103	1.757	
3	Independiente	—	33	54	27	114	65	1.754	
4	Boca Juniors	61	31	64	20	176	103	1.709	
5	Lanús	59	35	42	38	174	103	1.689	
6	Estudiantes (LP)	59	31	51	32	173	103	1.68	
7	River Plate	58	39	49	18	164	103	1.592	
8	Racing	33	41	57	24	155	103	1.505	
9	Rosario Central	54	21	59	20	154	103	1.495	
10	Gimnasia y Esgrima (LP)	57	24	44	25	150	103	1.456	
11	Godoy Cruz	56	21	32	33	142	103	1.379	
12	Unión	—	—	41	22	63	46	1.37	
13	Tigre	49	26	46	20	141	103	1.369	
14	Belgrano	49	25	51	16	141	103	1.369	
15	Vélez Sarsfield	61	25	29	24	139	103	1.35	
16	Newell's Old Boys	56	25	40	16	137	103	1.33	
17	Banfield	—	20	50	15	85	65	1.308	
18	San Martín (SJ)	—	—	37	23	60	46	1.304	
19	Patronato	—	—	—	20	20	16	1.25	
20	Arsenal	48	26	27	27	128	103	1.243	
21	Aldosivi	—	—	40	17	57	46	1.239	
22	Huracán	—	—	30	25	55	46	1.196	
23	Defensa y Justicia	—	20	32	25	77	65	1.185	
24	Olimpo	50	19	36	13	118	103	1.146	
25	Quilmes	45	12	45	15	117	103	1.136	
26	Colón	—	—	34	17	51	46	1.109	
27	Atlético de Rafaela	49	25	23	9	106	103	1.029	
28	Sarmiento	—	—	30	17	47	46	1.022	
29	Temperley	—	—	30	16	46	46	1	
30	Argentinos Juniors (R)	—	—	33	12	45	46	0.978	Relegation to Primera B Nacional

== Attendances ==
Source: AFA

No.	Club	Average
1	River Plate	50,814
2	Boca Juniors	42,107
3	Rosario Central	38,529
4	Newell's Old Boys	35,673
5	Atlético Tucumán	33,927
6	Racing Club	33,482
7	San Lorenzo	31,518
8	Independiente	28,296
9	Colón	27,911
10	Estudiantes de La Plata	25,734
11	Belgrano	22,481
12	Unión	20,762
13	GELP	17,216
14	Godoy Cruz	15,994
15	Huracán	15,328
16	Banfield	14,659
17	Lanús	13,741
18	San Martín	11,984
19	Vélez Sarsfield	11,427
20	Patronato	10,603
21	Temperley	9,824
22	Club Olimpo	8,517
23	Argentinos Juniors	7,821
24	Sarmiento	7,396
25	Defensa y Justicia	6,972
26	Tigre	5,743
27	Aldosivi	5,218
28	Quilmes	4,591
29	Atlético de Rafaela	3,718
30	Arsenal Fútbol Club	1,965

== See also ==
- 2015–16 Copa Argentina
- 2016 Primera B Nacional
