= 2015 Argentine Primera División =

125th season of top-tier football league in Argentina

Primera División
- Season: 2015
- Champions: Boca Juniors (31st title)
- Relegated: Nueva Chicago; Crucero del Norte
- 2016 Copa Libertadores: Boca Juniors; San Lorenzo; Racing; Rosario Central (via 2014–15 Copa Argentina); River Plate (via 2015 Copa Libertadores); Huracán (via 2015 Copa Sudamericana)
- 2016 Copa Sudamericana: Independiente; Belgrano; Banfield; Estudiantes (LP); Lanús
- Matches: 468
- Goals: 1,045 (2.23 per match)
- Top goalscorer: Marco Ruben (21 goals)

The 2015 Argentine Primera División or Torneo de Primera División 2015 "Julio H. Grondona" was the 125th season of top-flight professional football in Argentina. The season began on February 13 and ended on December 6. Thirty teams competed in the league, twenty returning from the 2014 Torneo de Transición and ten promoted from the 2014 Primera B Nacional (Aldosivi, Argentinos Juniors, Colón, Crucero del Norte, Huracán, Nueva Chicago, San Martín (SJ), Sarmiento, Temperley and Unión). No teams were relegated to the Primera B Nacional Championship in the previous tournament.

== Competition format ==
Each of the 30 teams plays the other sides once, along with an extra derby game, for a total of 30 matches for each side.

The winners and runners-up of the first division qualified for the 2016 Copa Libertadores. Additionally, the winner of the 2015 Copa Argentina earned the Argentina 3 berth to the Copa Libertadores. The teams that place third to sixth in the league table advanced to the Liguilla Pre-Libertadores. The winner of this Liguilla earned the fourth berth to the Copa Libertadores, with the runner-up entering the 2016 Copa Sudamericana. The teams that place seventh to eighteenth in addition to the losing semifinalists of the Liguilla Pre-Libertadores advanced to the Liguilla Pre-Sudamericana, to determine the six berths for the 2016 Copa Sudamericana.

== Club information ==
=== Stadia and locations ===
Locations of the 2015 Argentine Primera División teams outside Greater Buenos Aires.
Locations of the 2015 Argentine Primera División teams within Greater Buenos Aires.

Club	City	Stadium
Aldosivi	Mar del Plata	José María Minella
Argentinos Juniors	Buenos Aires	Diego Armando Maradona
Arsenal	Sarandí	Julio Humberto Grondona
Atlético de Rafaela	Rafaela	Nuevo Monumental
Banfield	Banfield	Florencio Sola
Belgrano	Córdoba	Mario Alberto Kempes
Boca Juniors	Buenos Aires	Alberto J. Armando
Colón	Santa Fe	Brigadier Estanislao López
Crucero del Norte	Garupá	Comandante Andrés Guacurarí
Defensa y Justicia	Florencio Varela	Tito Tomaghello
Estudiantes (LP)	La Plata	Único Ciudad de La Plata
Gimnasia y Esgrima (LP)	La Plata	Juan Carmelo Zerillo
Godoy Cruz	Godoy Cruz	Malvinas Argentinas
Huracán	Buenos Aires	Tomás Adolfo Ducó
Independiente	Avellaneda	Libertadores de América
Lanús	Lanús	Ciudad de Lanús - Néstor Díaz Pérez
Newell's Old Boys	Rosario	Marcelo Bielsa
Nueva Chicago	Buenos Aires	República de Mataderos
Olimpo	Bahía Blanca	Roberto Carminatti
Quilmes	Quilmes	Centenario Dr. José Luis Meiszner
Racing	Avellaneda	Presidente Perón
River Plate	Buenos Aires	Monumental Antonio Vespucio Liberti
Rosario Central	Rosario	Gigante de Arroyito
San Lorenzo	Buenos Aires	Pedro Bidegain
San Martín (SJ)	San Juan	Ingeniero Hilario Sánchez
Sarmiento	Junín	Eva Perón
Temperley	Temperley	Alfredo Martín Beranger
Tigre	Victoria	Don José Dellagiovanna
Unión	Santa Fe	15 de Abril
Vélez Sarsfield	Buenos Aires	José Amalfitani

=== Personnel and kits ===
Club	Manager	Kit manufacturer	Main sponsor
Aldosivi	(Argentina) Fernando Quiroz	Kappa	Mar del Plata
Argentinos Juniors	(Argentina) Néstor Gorosito	Joma	Provincia NET
Arsenal	(Argentina) Ricardo Caruso Lombardi	TBS	La Nueva Seguros
Atlético de Rafaela	(Argentina) Leonardo Astrada	Reusch	SanCor
Banfield	(Argentina) Claudio Vivas	Penalty	Banco Provincia
Belgrano	(Argentina) Ricardo Zielinski	Lotto	Tersuave
Boca Juniors	(Argentina) Rodolfo Arruabarrena	Nike	BBVA
Colón	(Argentina) Darío Franco	Umbro	OSPAT
Crucero del Norte	(Argentina) Sebastián Rambert	Sport 2000	Rosamonte
Defensa y Justicia	(Argentina) Ariel Holan	Lyon	Rápido Tata
Estudiantes (LP)	(Argentina) Gabriel Milito	Adidas	DirecTV
Gimnasia y Esgrima (LP)	(Argentina) Pedro Troglio	Penalty	Lotería de la Provincia
Godoy Cruz	(Argentina) Daniel Oldrá	Lotto	Mendoza Espíritu Grande
Huracán	(Argentina) Eduardo Domínguez	TBS	La Nueva Seguros
Independiente	(Argentina) Mauricio Pellegrino	Puma	Correo OCA
Lanús	(Argentina) Guillermo Barros Schelotto	KDY	Yamaha
Newell's Old Boys	(Argentina) Lucas Bernardi	Adidas	Banco Ciudad
Nueva Chicago	(Argentina) Rubén Forestello	Joma	La Nueva Seguros
Olimpo	(Argentina) Diego Osella	Kappa	Bingo Bahía
Quilmes	(Argentina) Facundo Sava	Lotto	Quilmes
Racing	(Argentina) Diego Cocca	Topper	Banco Hipotecario
River Plate	(Argentina) Marcelo Gallardo	Adidas	BBVA
Rosario Central	(Argentina) Eduardo Coudet	Nike	Banco Municipal
San Lorenzo	(Argentina) Edgardo Bauza	Nike	Banco Ciudad
San Martín (SJ)	(Argentina) Carlos Mayor	Mitre	San Juan
Sarmiento	(Argentina) Sergio Lippi	Penalty	Naldo
Temperley	(Argentina) Ricardo Rezza	OhCan	Secco / Cetec Sudamericana
Tigre	(Argentina) Gustavo Alfaro	Kappa	Banco Macro
Unión	(Argentina) Leonardo Madelón	TBS	Flecha Bus
Vélez Sarsfield	(Argentina) Miguel Ángel Russo	Umbro	Hitachi

=== Managerial changes ===
Team	Outgoing manager	Manner of departure	Date of vacancy	Replaced by	Date of appointment	Position in table
Pre-season changes
Vélez Sarsfield	(Argentina) José Oscar Flores	End of contract	December 6, 2014	(Argentina) Miguel Ángel Russo	December 9, 2014	N/A
Newell's Old Boys	(Argentina) Gustavo Raggio	Mutual agreement	December 7, 2014	(Argentina) Américo Gallego	December 8, 2014	N/A
Rosario Central	(Argentina) Hugo Galloni	Replaced	December 12, 2014	(Argentina) Eduardo Coudet	December 12, 2014	N/A
San Martín (SJ)	(Argentina) Rubén Forestello	Resigned	December 15, 2014	(Argentina) Carlos Mayor	December 31, 2014	N/A
Quilmes	(Argentina) Marcelo Pontiroli	Replaced	December 20, 2014	(Argentina) Julio César Falcioni	December 20, 2014	N/A
Tournament changes
Colón	(Argentina) Reinaldo Merlo	Sacked	February 16, 2015	(Argentina) Javier Oscar López ^{1}	February 16, 2015	29th
Nueva Chicago	(Argentina) Omar Labruna	Sacked	March 31, 2015	(Argentina) Alejandro Nanía ^{2}	March 31, 2015	28th
Atlético de Rafaela	(Argentina) Roberto Sensini	Sacked	April 4, 2015	(Argentina) Leonardo Astrada ^{3}	April 13, 2015	28th
Olimpo	(Argentina) Walter Perazzo	Resigned	April 12, 2015	(Argentina) Diego Osella ^{4}	April 17, 2015	27th
Estudiantes (LP)	(Argentina) Mauricio Pellegrino	Sacked	April 14, 2015	(Argentina) Gabriel Milito ^{5}	April 15, 2015	16th
Defensa y Justicia	(Argentina) Darío Franco	Resigned	April 18, 2015	(Argentina) José Oscar Flores	April 20, 2015	21st
Arsenal	(Argentina) Martín Palermo	Resigned	April 19, 2015	(Argentina) Ricardo Caruso Lombardi ^{6}	May 9, 2015	26th
Crucero del Norte	(Argentina) Gabriel Schürrer	Resigned	April 22, 2015	(Argentina) Sebastián Rambert ^{7}	April 27, 2015	27th
Nueva Chicago	(Argentina) Alejandro Nanía	Resigned	May 9, 2015	(Argentina) Rubén Forestello	May 15, 2015	30th
Independiente	(Argentina) Jorge Almirón	Resigned	May 25, 2015	(Argentina) Mauricio Pellegrino ^{8}	June 4, 2015	17th
Newell's Old Boys	(Argentina) Américo Gallego	Sacked	June 1, 2015	(Argentina) Lucas Bernardi ^{9}	June 10, 2015	7th
Colón	(Argentina) Javier Oscar López	Resigned	June 6, 2015	(Argentina) Darío Franco	June 10, 2015	21st
Godoy Cruz	(Argentina) Daniel Oldrá	Resigned	June 7, 2015	(Argentina) Gabriel Heinze	June 10, 2015	22nd
Defensa y Justicia	(Argentina) José Oscar Flores	Mutual agreement	June 10, 2015	(Argentina) Ariel Holan	June 11, 2015	27th
Quilmes	(Argentina) Julio César Falcioni	Mutual agreement	July 20, 2015	(Argentina) Facundo Sava	July 21, 2015	23rd
Banfield	(Argentina) Matías Almeyda	Resigned	August 3, 2015	(Argentina) Claudio Vivas ^{10}	August 4, 2015	12th
Huracán	(Argentina) Néstor Apuzzo	Resigned	August 15, 2015	(Argentina) Eduardo Domínguez	August 18, 2015	26th
Godoy Cruz	(Argentina) Gabriel Heinze	Sacked	September 26, 2015	(Argentina) Daniel Oldrá ^{11}	September 26, 2015	25th

Interim Managers

1. Interim manager, but later promoted to full-time manager.
2. Interim manager, but later promoted to full-time manager.
3. (Argentina) Gustavo Tognarelli was interim manager in the 9th round.
4. (Argentina) Alejandro Giuntini was interim manager in the 10th.
5. (Argentina) Nelson Vivas was interim manager in the 10th round.
6. (Argentina) Roberto Santiago González was interim manager in the suspended 7th round and 11th–12th rounds.
7. (Argentina) Miguel Ángel Salinas was interim manager in the 11th round.
8. (Argentina) Fernando Berón was interim manager in the 14th and 15th rounds.
9. (Argentina) Carlos Picerni was interim manager in the 15th round.
10. Interim manager.
11. Interim manager in the suspended 22nd round and 27th–30th rounds.

== Notable occurrences ==
- On January 25, Juan Román Riquelme announced his retirement from professional football, just one month after leading first club Argentinos Juniors back to the Primera División. Riquelme made his debut in 1996 and until his retirement played for Boca Juniors, Barcelona, Villarreal and Argentinos Juniors.
- On March 15, A San Lorenzo supporter died from injuries sustained at the end of the derby against Huracán (3–1, 5th round) after he lost his balance and fell from the highest point of the uncovered home stand behind the goal.
- On March 22, during the match San Martín (SJ)–Boca Juniors a tackle by Boca Juniors goalkeeper Agustín Orión resulted in a broken tibia and fibula in the right leg (from six to eight-month recovery) for San Martin's Carlos Bueno. Orión received a straight red card and got four-match ban.
- On March 30, the referee Ariel Penel suspended after 30 minutes the match between Arsenal and Aldosivi (0–1) due to disturbances outside the Estadio Julio Humberto Grondona. The match was finished on April 25 with final score 0–3.
- On April 4, the referee Germán Delfino awarded a penalty to Vélez Sarsfield after Daniel Rosero (Arsenal) was adjudged to have handled the ball in the area and showed his second booking of the game. As the penalty was about to be taken Delfino was told over his intercom that the handball was by Vélez Sarsfield striker Mariano Pavone and proceeded to overturn his decision and call Rosero back onto the field. Apparently the decision was overturned after linesman Iván Núñez caught a replay of the incident on a nearby cameraman's monitor and informed Delfino via his earpiece. Despite the correct decision was awarded by the referee, the video technology is not allowed in Argentine football and Delfino was banned one round.
- On May 21, The AFA's Disciplinary Tribunal gave the victory to Newell's Old Boys over Arsenal (0−1) for fielding an ineligible player. Arsenal were charged after they played the suspended midfielder Leandro Godoy in their 3−0 win over Newell's Old Boys on April 13 (9th round).
- On May 24, AFA suspended the match between Tigre and River Plate because of the death of Cristian Gómez, a player of second division football club Paraná, who died after collapsing on the pitch during a game.

== League table ==
Pos	Team	Pld	W	D	L	GF	GA	GD	Pts	Qualification
1	Boca Juniors (C)	30	20	4	6	49	26	+23	64	2016 Copa Libertadores group stage
2	San Lorenzo	30	18	7	5	44	20	+24	61	2016 Copa Libertadores group stage
3	Rosario Central	30	16	11	3	47	26	+21	59	2016 Copa Libertadores group stage
4	Racing	30	16	9	5	40	23	+17	57	2016 Copa Libertadores group stage
5	Independiente	30	14	12	4	44	22	+22	54	2016 Copa Sudamericana second stage
6	Belgrano	30	14	9	7	33	23	+10	51	2016 Copa Sudamericana second stage
7	Estudiantes (LP)	30	14	9	7	34	28	+6	51	2016 Copa Sudamericana second stage
8	Banfield	30	14	8	8	38	32	+6	50	2016 Copa Sudamericana second stage
9	River Plate	30	13	10	7	46	33	+13	49	2016 Copa Libertadores group stage
10	Tigre	30	12	10	8	32	25	+7	46	Advanced to Liguilla Pre-Sudamericana
11	Quilmes	30	13	6	11	38	37	+1	45	Advanced to Liguilla Pre-Sudamericana
12	Gimnasia y Esgrima (LP)	30	12	8	10	41	38	+3	44	Advanced to Liguilla Pre-Sudamericana
13	Lanús	30	10	12	8	33	29	+4	42	2016 Copa Sudamericana second stage
14	Unión	30	9	14	7	38	37	+1	41	Advanced to Liguilla Pre-Sudamericana
15	Aldosivi	30	11	7	12	37	40	−3	40	Advanced to Liguilla Pre-Sudamericana
16	Newell's Old Boys	30	10	10	10	27	30	−3	40	Advanced to Liguilla Pre-Sudamericana
17	San Martín (SJ)	30	8	13	9	32	34	−2	37	Advanced to Liguilla Pre-Sudamericana
18	Olimpo	30	8	12	10	23	26	−3	36	Advanced to Liguilla Pre-Sudamericana
19	Colón	30	7	13	10	26	31	−5	34	Advanced to Liguilla Pre-Sudamericana
20	Argentinos Juniors	30	8	9	13	30	38	−8	33	Advanced to Liguilla Pre-Sudamericana
21	Defensa y Justicia	30	8	8	14	27	31	−4	32	
22	Godoy Cruz	30	8	8	14	32	40	−8	32	
23	Huracán	30	6	12	12	29	37	−8	30	2016 Copa Libertadores first stage
24	Sarmiento	30	7	9	14	24	34	−10	30	
25	Temperley	30	6	12	12	19	29	−10	30	
26	Nueva Chicago	30	7	8	15	29	38	−9	29	
27	Vélez Sarsfield	30	7	8	15	27	37	−10	29	
28	Arsenal	30	7	6	17	25	44	−19	27	
29	Atlético de Rafaela	30	4	11	15	29	51	−22	23	
30	Crucero del Norte	30	3	5	22	21	55	−34	14	

Source: AFA
(C) Champions

Primera División
2015 champion

31st title

== Results ==
Teams play every other team once (either at home or away), and play one additional round against their local derby rival (or assigned match by AFA if a club doesn't have derby), completing a total of 30 rounds.

Home \ Away	ALD	ARG	ARS	RAF	BAN	BEL	BOC	COL	CRU	DYJ	EST	GLP	GOD	HUR	IND	LAN	NOB	NUE	OLI	QUI	RAC	RIV	RCE	SLA	SMA	SAR	TEM	TIG	UNI	VEL
Aldosivi					0–3			1–1	2–0				2–0	0–0	1–0	3–1	0–1			1–1	1–2		1–3	1–0	2–0		0–0		3–3	
Argentinos Juniors	0–1			2–0			1–3		4–0	1–0	2–2		0–0				2–1	1–1	0–1	0–2		1–2		2–3				2–1	1–2	
Arsenal	0–3	3–2		1–1			1–2		1–0	1–0	0–1	0–1					0–1	1–1	2–1	0–1		3–3						2–0	1–1	
Atlético de Rafaela	2–1				1–4	1–1				2–1	1–2		1–4				1–1	2–0		2–4	1–1	1–5	1–1	0–1			1–1		2–3	
Banfield		1–1	4–1			1–2		0–0	2–1			1–0		1–0	1–1	1–2					0–0		2–1		3–2	0–0	0–1			1–3
Belgrano	0–1	2–1	2–0	0–0			0–1		1–0	1–0	2–1	0–1					2–0	3–1	0–0	2–1		1–2						1–0		
Boca Juniors	0–3			1–0	3–0				1–0	2–1	3–0		2–0				4–0	0–0	3–1	2–1		2–0		0–1				1–0	3–4	
Colón		1–1	3–1	2–1		0–1	1–1					2–1		1–1	0–1	1–2			1–0						2–2	0–1		0–1	0–0	0–0
Crucero del Norte	0–2			1–1				0–0		3–1	1–2			3–3	0–4	1–3		0–1	0–0			0–1	0–1		3–1		1–0	0–0		
Defensa y Justicia	4–0		1–0		1–0			2–3			0–1		1–1				1–0	2–1		0–1	1–1	1–0	3–3	1–2			0–1		0–0	
Estudiantes (LP)	2–1				1–2			0–0				1–1	2–1				0–2	1–0		4–1	1–1	2–1	1–1	0–2	0–0		2–1		2–0	
Gimnasia y Esgrima (LP)	4–1	4–2		1–0			1–2		2–1	0–1	1–3		2–0				0–0	2–1	2–2	3–2		2–3						1–1	5–2	
Godoy Cruz			0–0		1–2	1–0		1–3	3–0					2–1	2–2	1–5					1–2		1–3	1–1	1–1	1–0	3–0			2–2
Huracán		4–0	1–0	3–2		1–1	0–2			0–0	1–0	1–1			1–1	0–0			1–3					1–0		3–0		1–2		0–0
Independiente		0–0	4–0	2–0		1–2	1–1			1–0	1–1	1–1						2–1	3–1		3–0	3–0				1–1		1–0		1–0
Lanús		0–1	0–0	3–0	0–1	0–0	1–3			0–1	0–0	2–0			1–1			1–0	2–0							2–1		1–1		0–1
Newell's Old Boys					1–1			0–1	2–0				2–0	2–0	2–3	1–1				1–1	3–0		0–1	1–1	1–0		0–0		2–0	0–0
Nueva Chicago	3–1	1–2			1–2			0–0					0–2	3–0			5–0			2–1	0–0	1–4	0–2	0–1	0–0		0–2		2–2	
Olimpo	3–1			0–0	1–2					0–0	0–0		1–0				2–0	0–0		0–1	0–0	1–1	1–3	2–1		1–0			0–0	
Quilmes					0–1			1–0	3–1				0–0	2–1	1–2	0–1					2–1		3–1	1–2	2–0	0–4	0–0		1–3	2–1
Racing		1–0	2–1			0–0	3–1	4–1	3–0			2–0		2–0	1–0	2–0							0–1		2–0	2–1	2–1			3–1
River Plate	1–1				4–1		0–1	3–1					1–0	1–1		1–1	0–2			2–2	0–0		2–0	1–0	0–1		1–1		2–2	
Rosario Central		2–0	1–0			3–1	3–1	1–1				4–0		1–1	1–1	1–1	0–0								2–1	1–1	1–0	2–1		0–0
San Lorenzo			3–0		0–0	0–0		2–0	2–1			1–0		3–1	1–0	4–0					2–1		2–2		1–2	3–0	2–0			1–0
San Martín (SJ)		0–0	1–0	1–1		1–1	1–1			2–2		1–1	1–2	3–2	1–1	1–1			2–0							0–1		3–1		3–1
Sarmiento	2–2	0–0	2–0	0–1		1–3	0–1		2–1	2–1	0–1	0–0					1–2	1–2	0–0			1–4						0–1		
Temperley		0–0	1–2			2–1	0–2	2–1				1–3		0–0	0–1	1–1			0–0	0–0					0–1	0–0		1–1		2–1
Tigre	2–1			2–1	3–1					0–0	2–0		2–1				0–0	2–0	1–0	0–1	0–0	0–0		1–1					2–1	3–0
Unión					0–0	1–1		0–0	5–2				1–0	1–0	1–1	1–1					1–2		0–1	1–1	0–0	0–1	2–1			1–0
Vélez Sarsfield	2–0	0–1	2–1	2–2		1–2	2–0		2–1	2–1	0–1	0–1						1–2	0–2			0–1				1–1		2–2		

Updated to match(es) played on 9 November 2015. Source: AFA
Legend: Blue = home team win; Yellow = draw; Red = away team win.

== Liguilla Pre Libertadores ==
The Liguilla Pre Libertadores is contested by the four best placed teams from the league that have not already qualified for the Copa Libertadores, with the winners gaining a place in the 2016 tournament and the runners-up playing in the Copa Sudamericana. The losing semi-finalists play in the Liguilla Pre Sudamericana.

Semi-finals
5	Independiente	4
6	Belgrano	1
4	Racing	2
7	Estudiantes (LP)	1

Final
5	Independiente	0	2	2
4	Racing	2	1	3

=== Semi-finals ===
November 19, 2015

Independiente	4 – 1	Belgrano

Libertadores de América, Avellaneda

November 20, 2015

Racing	2 – 1	Estudiantes (LP)

Presidente Péron, Avellaneda

=== Final ===
==== First leg ====
November 29, 2015

Independiente	0–2	Racing

Libertadores de América, Avellaneda

==== Second leg ====
December 6, 2015

Racing	1–2	Independiente

Presidente Péron, Avellaneda

Racing won 3–2 on aggregate and qualified to 2016 Copa Libertadores.
Independiente qualified to 2016 Copa Sudamericana.

== Liguilla Pre Sudamericana ==
The Liguilla Pre Sudamericana is contested by the twelve best placed teams from the league that have not already qualified for the Copa Libertadores, plus the two losing semi-finalists from the Liguilla Pre Libertadores. The four winners of the finals qualify for the 2016 Copa Sudamericana.

=== Semi-finals ===
November 19, 2015

Tigre	1 – 4	Colón

Don José Dellagiovanna, Victoria

November 20, 2015

Unión	1 – 2	Aldosivi

Estadio 15 de Abril, Santa Fe

November 20, 2015

Gimnasia y Esgrima (LP)	5 – 1	San Martín (SJ)

Juan Carmelo Zerillo, La Plata

November 23, 2015

Quilmes	0 – 1	Olimpo

Estadio Centenario Dr. José Luis Meiszner, Quilmes

November 23, 2015

Lanús	2 – 1	Newell's Old Boys

Ciudad de Lanús Néstor Díaz Pérez, Lanús

November 24, 2015

Banfield	1 – 0	Argentinos Juniors

Estadio Florencio Sola, Banfield

=== Finals ===
Team 1	Agg.	Team 2	1st leg	2nd leg
Colón	1–2	Belgrano	0–1	1–1
Olimpo	0–5	Estudiantes (LP)	0–1	0–4
Aldosivi	3–4	Banfield	2–3	1–1
Lanús	3–1	Gimnasia y Esgrima (LP)	1–0	2–1

==== Match 1 ====
November 28, 2015

Colón	0–1	Belgrano

Estadio Brigadier General Estanislao López, Santa Fe

December 5, 2015

Belgrano	1–1	Colón

Estadio Mario Alberto Kempes, Córdoba

==== Match 2 ====
November 29, 2015

Aldosivi	2–3	Banfield

Estadio José María Minella, Mar del Plata

December 5, 2015

Banfield	1–1	Aldosivi

Estadio Florencio Sola, Banfield

==== Match 3 ====
November 28, 2015

Olimpo	0–1	Estudiantes (LP)

Roberto Carminatti, Bahía Blanca

December 5, 2015

Estudiantes (LP)	4–0	Olimpo

Estadio Julio Humberto Grondona, Sarandí

==== Match 4 ====
November 28, 2015

Lanús	1–0	Gimnasia y Esgrima (LP)

Ciudad de Lanús Néstor Díaz Pérez, Lanús

December 6, 2015

Gimnasia y Esgrima (LP)	1–2	Lanús

Juan Carmelo Zerillo, La Plata

The four sides who won their ties on aggregate qualified for 2016 Copa Sudamericana.

== Season statistics ==
=== Top goalscorers ===
Rank	Player	Club	Goals
1	(Argentina) Marco Ruben	Rosario Central	21
2	(Argentina) Leandro Fernández	Godoy Cruz	15
3	(Argentina) Claudio Bieler	Quilmes	14
4	(Argentina) José Sand	Aldosivi	12
5	(Argentina) Fernando Cavenaghi	River Plate	11
5	(Argentina) Alejandro Gagliardi	Nueva Chicago	11
7	(Argentina) Ramón Ábila	Huracán	10
7	(Argentina) Jonathan Calleri	Boca Juniors	10
7	(Uruguay) Martín Cauteruccio	San Lorenzo	10
7	(Argentina) Maxi Rodríguez	Newell's Old Boys	10

=== Top assists ===
Rank	Player	Club	Assists
1	(Argentina) Víctor Malcorra	Unión	9
2	(Argentina) Marcos Acuña	Racing	8
3	(Argentina) Mauricio Carrasco	Nueva Chicago	7
3	(Argentina) Ezequiel Cerutti	Estudiantes (LP)	7
3	(Argentina) Hernán Encina	Olimpo	7
3	(Argentina) Jesús Méndez	Independiente	7
3	(Argentina) Matías Pisano	Independiente	7
8	(Argentina) Fabrizio Angileri	Godoy Cruz	6
8	(Argentina) Rodrigo Gómez	Quilmes	6
8	(Colombia) Roger Martínez	Aldosivi	6
8	(Argentina) Maximiliano Meza	Gimnasia y Esgrima (LP)	6
8	(Argentina) Jorge Ortiz	Lanús/Independiente	6

Source: AFA

== Relegation ==
Pos	Team	2012–13 Pts	2013–14 Pts	2014 Pts	2015 Pts	Total Pts	Total Pld	Avg	Relegation
1	Independiente	—	—	33	54	87	49	1.776	
2	River Plate	64	58	39	49	210	125	1.68	
3	Boca Juniors	51	61	31	64	207	125	1.656	
4	San Lorenzo	58	60	26	61	205	125	1.64	
5	Lanús	67	59	35	42	203	125	1.624	
6	Newell's Old Boys	74	56	25	40	195	125	1.56	
7	Racing	62	33	41	57	193	125	1.544	
8	Rosario Central	—	54	21	59	134	87	1.54	
9	Estudiantes (LP)	48	59	31	51	189	125	1.512	
10	Belgrano	59	49	25	51	184	125	1.472	
11	Gimnasia y Esgrima (LP)	—	57	24	44	125	87	1.437	
12	Banfield	—	—	20	50	70	49	1.429	
13	Vélez Sarsfield	61	61	25	29	176	125	1.408	
14	Unión	—	—	—	41	41	30	1.367	
15	Aldosivi	—	—	—	40	40	30	1.333	
16	Arsenal	60	48	26	27	161	125	1.288	
17	Godoy Cruz	49	56	21	32	158	125	1.264	
18	Tigre	34	49	26	46	155	125	1.24	
19	San Martín (SJ)	—	—	—	37	37	30	1.233	
20	Quilmes	50	45	12	45	152	125	1.216	
21	Olimpo	—	50	19	36	105	87	1.207	
22	Colón	—	—	—	34	34	30	1.133	
23	Atlético de Rafaela	43	49	25	23	140	125	1.12	
24	Argentinos Juniors	—	—	—	33	33	30	1.1	
25	Defensa y Justicia	—	—	20	32	52	49	1.061	
26	Huracán	—	—	—	30	30	30	1	
27	Sarmiento	—	—	—	30	30	30	1	
28	Temperley	—	—	—	30	30	30	1	
29	Nueva Chicago (R)	—	—	—	29	29	30	0.967	Relegation to Primera B Nacional
30	Crucero del Norte (R)	—	—	—	14	14	30	0.467	Relegation to Primera B Nacional

Source: AFA

== Attendances ==
Source: AFA

No.	Club	Average
1	River Plate	45,732
2	Boca Juniors	44,921
3	Rosario Central	39,684
4	Newell's Old Boys	37,591
5	Independiente	33,417
6	Racing Club	30,843
7	Belgrano	28,269
8	San Lorenzo	25,732
9	Colón	23,298
10	Estudiantes de La Plata	21,994
11	Huracán	18,465
12	GELP	18,214
13	Nueva Chicago	17,381
14	Unión	16,718
15	Banfield	15,052
16	Temperley	14,391
17	Vélez Sarsfield	13,579
18	Tigre	13,428
19	San Martín	11,992
20	Aldosivi	10,861
21	Sarmiento	10,763
22	Lanús	10,482
23	Defensa y Justicia	8,935
24	Argentinos Juniors	8,416
25	Quilmes	8,247
26	Godoy Cruz	7,652
27	Club Olimpo	4,871
28	Atlético de Rafaela	4,598
29	Crucero del Norte	4,091
30	Arsenal Fútbol Club	3,984

== See also ==
- 2015 Primera B Nacional
