= Eduardo Magnín =

Argentine footballer

Personal information
- Full name: Eduardo José Magnín
- Date of birth: February 17, 1969 (age 57)
- Place of birth: San Jerónimo, Santa Fe, Argentina
- Height: 1.80 m (5 ft 11 in)
- Position: Defender

Senior career*
Years	Team	Apps	(Gls)
1990–1992	Unión de Santa Fe	30	(0)
1993–1995	San Martín-TU		
1996–1997	Unión de Santa Fe	27	(5)
1997–1998	Huracán	28	(1)
1998–1999	Badajoz		
1999–2000	Lausanne		
2000–2001	Unión de Santa Fe	20	(0)
2001–2002	Nueva Chicago	16	(0)
2002	Saprissa		
2003	Olimpia		
2003–2004	Patronato		
- * Club domestic league appearances and goals

Eduardo José Magnín (born February 17, 1969) is an Argentine former football defensive player, mostly remembered for being dismissed by the English referee Gary Willard only after the showing of three yellow cards during a European club match.

== Career ==
Magnín started his professional playing career in 1990 with Unión de Santa Fe, spent the 1994–95 season with San Martín de Tucumán before returning to Unión for two more years, and in 1997 he joined Club Atlético Huracán. After only one season with Huracán he joined CD Badajoz in Spain, and then spent one season (1999–2000) at FC Lausanne-Sports of Switzerland.

During this period he was involved in his most notable incident, coming in a UEFA Cup first round tie at the club's ground, the Stade Olympique de la Pontaise, in September 1999. The player received cautions in the 41st and 66th minutes of the game against Celta Vigo of Spain, the second of which should have resulted in an additional red card and the removal of the player from the pitch. However, the referee, Gary Willard of England, failed to realise that Magnín had been shown the first yellow card, and allowed play to continue with the player still present. When Magnín then earned a third yellow card four minutes later, he was finally shown red and dismissed. The match result (at 3–2 to Lausanne) was allowed to stand by UEFA, due to the club not having suffered a disadvantage by the incorrect application of the Laws of the game by Willard.

In 2000 Magnín returned to Argentina where he played once again for Unión and then for Nueva Chicago. In his later playing days he turned out for Deportivo Saprissa in Costa Rica, Olimpia of Paraguay, and finally Patronato de Paraná of the Regionalised Argentine 4th division. He is now officially retired.
