= Diego Erroz =

Argentine footballer and coach

Personal information
- Full name: Diego José Erroz
- Date of birth: 21 September 1978 (age 48)
- Place of birth: Berrotarán, Argentina
- Height: 1.73 m (5 ft 8 in)
- Position: Midfielder

Senior career*
Years	Team	Apps	(Gls)
1996–2002	Rosario Central	79	(1)
2003–2007	Tiro Federal	53	(1)
2004–2005	→ Almagro (loan)	34	(0)
2007–2011	Atlético Tucumán	114	(1)
2011–2012	Talleres	22	(0)
2012	Tiro Federal	1	(0)
Total		303	(3)
- * Club domestic league appearances and goals

Diego José Erroz (born 21 September 1978) is a former Argentine association football midfielder and current coach.

Erroz was born in Berrotarán, Argentina, and currently works as coaching staff for Atlético Tucumán of the Primera B Nacional in Argentina.

== Teams ==
- (Argentina) Rosario Central 1996–2002
- (Argentina) Tiro Federal 2003–2004
- (Argentina) Almagro 2004–2005
- (Argentina) Tiro Federal 2005–2007
- (Argentina) Atlético Tucumán 2007–2011
- (Argentina) Talleres 2011–2012
- (Argentina) Tiro Federal 2012–2013

== Titles ==
- (Argentina) Atlético Tucumán 2007-2008 (Torneo Argentino A)
- (Argentina) Atlético Tucumán 2008-2009 (Primera B Nacional)
