= Daniel Oldrá =

Argentine footballer and manager

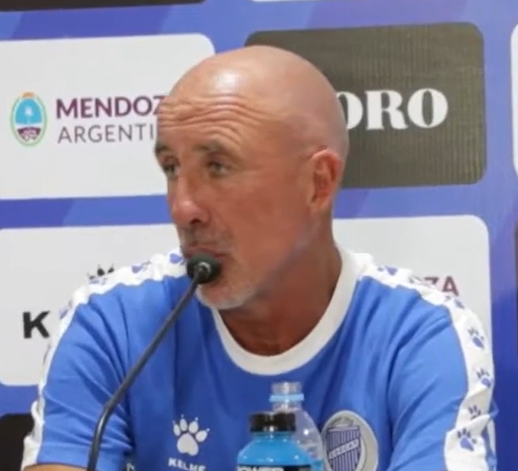
- Oldrá in 2019

Personal information
- Full name: Daniel Walter Oldrá
- Date of birth: 15 March 1967 (age 59)
- Place of birth: Godoy Cruz, Mendoza, Argentina
- Height: 1.83 m (6 ft 0 in)
- Positions: Right-back; centre back

Senior career*
Years	Team	Apps	(Gls)
1987–1988	Godoy Cruz		
1988–1991	River Plate	11	(0)
1991–1992	Blooming		
1993–1996	Godoy Cruz		
1996–1997	Gimnasia y Tiro	15	
1997–2002	Godoy Cruz		
Total		215	(11)

Managerial career
- 2005–2007: Godoy Cruz (assistant)
- 2007–2008: Godoy Cruz
- 2009: Godoy Cruz (interim)
- 2012: Godoy Cruz (interim)
- 2012: Godoy Cruz (interim)
- 2014: Godoy Cruz (interim)
- 2014–2015: Godoy Cruz
- 2015: Godoy Cruz (interim)
- 2019: Godoy Cruz (interim)
- 2020–2021: Godoy Cruz (interim)
- 2023–2024: Godoy Cruz
- 2025–2026: Instituto
- * Club domestic league appearances and goals

Daniel Walter Oldrá (born 15 March 1967) is an Argentine retired football coach and former player who played as a right-back or a centre back.

Oldrá is considered one of the best central defenders in the history of Mendoza football.

== Playing career ==
=== Early years ===
Nicknamed "El Gato" (The Cat) he was formed in Godoy Cruz, he debuted in the professional staff at age of 20, in the Mendoza Football League a year later, he tried his luck at River Plate, where he stayed for three seasons, he made his debut in "First Division" on 2 July 1989. In River he played 11 games, 6 of which were for the local championship, 4 for "Copa Libertadores" and one for "Liguilla".

=== Step football abroad ===
After his time at River Plate, Oldrá was transferred to Bolivian football, precisely at Blooming in 1991, where he played a few games during a season and a half.

=== Back to Argentina ===
In early 1993, Oldrá returned to Argentinian soccer, arriving at Godoy Cruz, where he made his debut as a professional player for the club. In that season, "The Grave" was intended to dispute the Torneo del Interior (third division of Argentine soccer federal then); Godoy Cruz managed to win the championship and the ascent to the National B, with Daniel Oldrá, as a great reference of the team.

In the second half of 1996, he was transferred to Gimnasia y Tiro de Salta, where he then played the Nacional B and in 1997 achieved promotion to the First Division of Argentina.

After his time at Gimnasia y Tiro, he returned to Godoy Cruz, where he stayed for five seasons. During that time he had several offers to join Chinese, American and Italian outlets, but "El Gato" decided to stay in "Tomba", until his retirement as a professional player, becoming one of the great idols of club. During his total professional career he played 215 games and scored 10 goals.

== Managerial career ==
So far Oldrá only managed Godoy Cruz. From 2002 to 2021 he had 12 spells when he was in charge of the first team. Nine as a caretaker-manager, three on a contract. The first was in 2007, when "El Tomba" had a very good season in the Primera B Nacional, winning promotion to the First Division of Argentina in June 2008; Godoy Cruz, from the hand of Oldrá, returns to ascend to «First Division», directly. After the promotion with the "Tomba", Daniel Oldrá decided to leave the technical leadership of the team; who would replace him later would be Diego Cocca. His second term in the team was in 2014, where he managed 20 games between two tournaments, getting 6 wins, 6 draws and 8 losses, on 8 June, Daniel Oldrá resigned after having a bad campaign with "El Tomba". Since 2016 he is the sports director of Tomba.

== Honours ==
River Plate

- Argentine Primera División: 1989–90

Godoy Cruz Antonio Tomba

- Torneo del Interior: 1994
