= Alfredo Grelak =

Argentine footballer (born 1970)

Personal information
- Full name: Alfredo Daniel Grelak
- Date of birth: 20 June 1970 (age 56)
- Place of birth: Berazategui, Argentina
- Height: 1.85 m (6 ft 1 in)
- Position: Defender

Team information
- Current team: Estudiantes BA (manager)

Senior career*
Years	Team	Apps	(Gls)
1987–1994	Quilmes	123	(1)
1994	Racing de Santander	0	(0)
1994–1995	→ Gimnástica Torrelavega (loan)	10	(0)
1995–1997	Huracán Corrientes	20	(0)
1997	Unión Española	0	(0)
1998	Caen	2	(0)
1998–2001	Gimnasia CdU	100	(15)
2001	Los Andes	20	(2)
2002–2003	Platense	31	(5)
2003–2004	Gimnasia CdU	total	(↑)
2004–2005	Temperley	23	(1)
2005–2006	Cambaceres	27	(0)

Managerial career
- 2007–2009: Quilmes (assistant)
- 2009–2010: San Lorenzo (youth)
- 2010: San Lorenzo (assistant)
- 2013: Chile U15
- 2013–2015: Chile U17
- 2015: Quilmes II
- 2016–2017: Quilmes
- 2017–2018: Almagro
- 2018–2019: Mitre SdE
- 2019–2020: San Martín SJ
- 2021: Boca Unidos
- 2022: Nueva Chicago
- 2023: Mitre SdE
- 2024: San Telmo
- 2025: Ferro Carril Oeste
- 2025–2026: Quilmes
- 2026–: Estudiantes BA
- * Club domestic league appearances and goals

Alfredo Grelak (born 20 June 1970 in Berazategui, Buenos Aires, Argentina) is an Argentine former professional footballer who played as a defender for clubs in Argentina, Chile, Spain and France. He is the current manager of Estudiantes BA.

== Clubs (player) ==
- Quilmes 1987–1994
- Racing de Santander 1994
- Gimnástica de Torrelavega 1994–1995
- Huracán Corrientes 1995–1997
- Unión Española 1997
- Caen 1998
- Gimnasia y Esgrima de Concepción del Uruguay 1998–2001
- Los Andes 2001
- Platense 2002–2003
- Gimnasia y Esgrima de Concepción del Uruguay 2003–2004
- Temperley 2004–2005
- Defensores de Cambaceres 2005–2006

== Clubs (manager) ==
- Quilmes 2007–2009 (assistant coach)
- San Lorenzo 2009 (youth coach)
- Ferrocarril Oeste 2025 (head coach)
