= Pablo Lavallén =

Argentine footballer

Personal information
- Full name: Pablo Hernán Lavallén
- Date of birth: 7 September 1972 (age 54)
- Place of birth: Buenos Aires, Argentina
- Height: 1.75 m (5 ft 9 in)
- Position: Defender

Senior career*
Years	Team	Apps	(Gls)
1991–1996	River Plate	78	(4)
1996–2001	Atlas	160	(16)
2002	Veracruz	15	(0)
2002	Huracán	10	(0)
2003–2004	San Luis	45	(2)
2004–2005	Huracán TA	24	(0)
2005–2006	Coyotes de Sonora	30	(0)
2007	Platense	4	(0)

International career
1989	Argentina U-17	3	(0)

Managerial career
- 2015–2016: San Martín de San Juan
- 2016–2017: Atlético Tucumán
- 2017–2018: Belgrano
- 2019: Colón
- 2022: CD Olimpia
- 2022–2023: Melgar
- 2023: Sarmiento
- 2024: The Strongest
- * Club domestic league appearances and goals

Pablo Hernán Lavallén (born 7 September 1972) is an Argentine football manager and former player who played as a defender.

== Playing career ==
Lavallén made his professional debut in 1991 for River Plate, over the following five years he won three league titles and the Copa Libertadores 1996 championship with the team.

In 1996, he joined Atlas where he played until his return to Argentina in 2002 to play for Huracán. In 2003, he joined Real San Luis where he played until 2004.

In 2004, he returned to Argentina to play for newly promoted Huracán de Tres Arroyos but he returned to Mexico after they were relegated in 2005. His last Mexican club was Coyotes de Sonora, he retired in 2007 after a brief stint in the Argentine 2nd division with Club Atlético Platense.

== Managerial career ==
In July 2022 he became manager of Peruvian club Melgar. He was sacked the following 6 March, after a poor start of the season.

== Titles ==
Season	Team	Title
Apertura 1991	River Plate	Primera División Argentina
Apertura 1993	River Plate	Primera División Argentina
Apertura 1994	River Plate	Primera División Argentina
1996	River Plate	Copa Libertadores
