= Santa Fe derby =

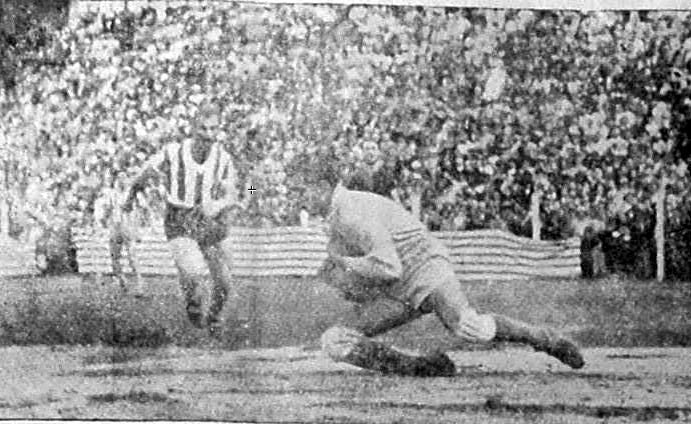
- Santa Fe derby from 1951 which result was Unión 1-Colón 1; goalkeeper Raúl Tenutta (Colón) blocks the ball after a shot by Habichuayn (Unión).

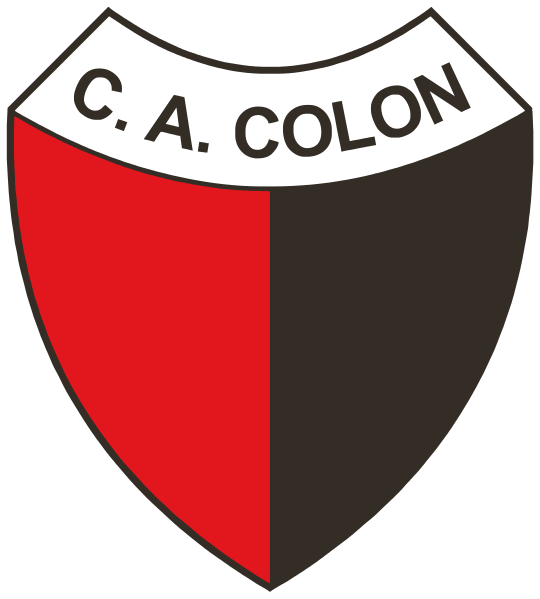
- Colón Unión
- Native name: Clásico Santafesino
- Sport: Association football
- Location: Santa Fe, Argentina
- First meeting: 30 March 1913; Friendly match Unión 2–3 Colón
- Latest meeting: 1 October 2023; 2023 Copa de la Liga Profesional; Colón 0–0 Unión
- Stadiums: Estadio Brigadier López; Estadio 15 de Abril

Statistics
- Total meetings: 159 (Note: Include league and cup matches.)
- Most wins: Unión (57)
- Most player appearances: Aniceto Roldán (15)
- Top scorer: Francisco Valiente (14)
- All-time series: Unión: 57; Colón: 48; Draws: 54
- Largest victory: Colón 5–0 Unión (1918); Colón 0–5 Unión (1920)

The Santa Fe derby (Clásico Santafesino in Spanish) is one of the most fiercely contested derbies in Argentine football. It is played between local clubs Colón and Unión. The two teams have faced each other in three stages. First, in the amateur era (1913–1931), then in the professional Santa Fe Football League (1931–1939), and finally within the AFA (1948 onwards).

Colón play their home games at the Estadio Brigadier General Estanislao López, while Unión play their home games at Estadio 15 de Abril.

== Results ==
As of 1 Oct 2023; only official matches are included

Championship	Matches	Colón wins	Draws	Unión wins
AFA tournaments (1948–present) (Note: Include matches played in Primera División and Primera B Metropolitana and Primera B Nacional divisions)	97	27	40	30
National cups	1	1	0	0
Liga Santafesina (1913–40)	49	17	12	20
Regional cups	12	3	2	7
Total:	159	48	54	57
