= Correo OCA =

- Industry: Postal services and logistics
- Founded: 1957; 69 years ago
- Headquarters: Buenos Aires, Argentina
- Website: www.oca.com.ar

Correo OCA (OCA Mail) is an Argentine company created in the province of Córdoba in 1957 as a "service management" for the company IKA, Industrias Kaiser Argentina.

== History ==
In 1960 the headquarters were moved to Buenos Aires and besides a railroad, OCA also had a fleet of vehicles to ensure the shipping of items.

In 1973, the Government of Argentina passed the post office law 20,216, which replaced Law 816 of 1876, which made the services agreed by private carriers to pass into the hands of the state.

In December 1997, OCA was acquired by 605 million dollars by the Exxel Group, a private Equity fund managed by the Uruguayan businessman Juan Navarro, who announced the investment to buy Edcadassa, Villalonga Furlong ( who is the operator of Interbaires, which manages the free shop in the Airports) and Ocasa, all companies belonging to Alfredo Yabrán.

In 2003, the ten OCA creditor banks were left with full control of the firm in exchange for a debt of $230 million that had the Exxel Group

In 2004, Advent International, an investment group headquartered in Boston, acquired stake in Correo OCA.

In 2009 the President of the company, Alfredo Romero, agreed with OCA Advent transfer.

== See also ==
- Alfredo Yabrán
