= Fernando Quiroz =

Argentine footballer and manager

Fernando "Teté" Quiroz
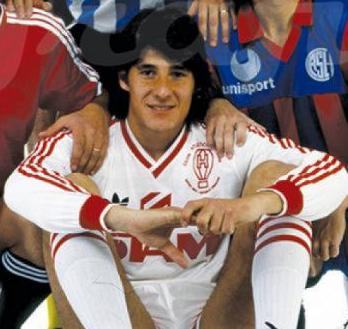

Personal information
- Full name: Fernando Héctor Quiroz
- Date of birth: June 19, 1968 (age 58)
- Place of birth: Buenos Aires, Argentina
- Position: Midfielder

Team information
- Current team: Gimnasia y Tiro (Head coach)

Senior career*
Years	Team	Apps	(Gls)
1988–1993	Huracán	175	(10)
1993–1999	Racing Club	124	(7)
2000	San Martín Tucumán	0	(0)
2001	Nueva Chicago	3	(0)

Managerial career
- 2001: San Martín Tucumán
- 2002: Racing Club
- 2003: Huracán
- 2004–2005: Platense
- 2005: Huracán
- 2005: Instituto
- 2005–2006: Racing Club
- 2006: Instituto
- 2007–2008: San Martín SJ
- 2008–2009: Unión Santa Fe
- 2009–2010: Independiente Rivadavia
- 2010: San Martín SJ
- 2010: Juventud Unida Universitario
- 2011: Blooming
- 2011–2013: Aldosivi
- 2013: Guabirá
- 2013–2014: Douglas Haig
- 2014: Deportes Concepción
- 2014–2016: Aldosivi
- 2017: Sarmiento de Junín
- 2019: Santamarina
- 2020–2021: Instituto
- 2021: Estudiantes BA
- 2023: Aldosivi
- 2025–: Gimnasia y Tiro
- * Club domestic league appearances and goals

Fernando Héctor Quiroz is a retired Argentine football midfielder. He was born on June 19, 1968, in Buenos Aires and has worked as a football manager since 2001. He is currently the head coach of Gimnasia y Tiro de Salta.

== Playing career ==
Quiroz started his career with Buenos Aires–based Club Atlético Huracán in 1990. In 1993, he was transferred to Racing Club where he played until 1999. In 2001, he had a brief spell with Nueva Chicago.

== Managerial career ==
Quiroz began his managerial career in 2001 with San Martín (Tucumán). He had two stints as manager of Racing Club (2002 and 2005–2006). He has also worked as the manager of Huracán, Platense, Instituto, San Martín (SJ), Unión de Santa Fe, Juventud Unida Universitario, among others. In addition, Quiroz managed a couple of clubs in the Liga de Fútbol Profesional Boliviano with short spells at Blooming during 2011 and Guabirá in 2013.

He was the manager for Aldosivi between 2011 and 2013 (in Primera B Nacional), and again between 2014 and 2016 (in Primera B Nacional and Argentine Primera División). He left his second spell with Aldosivi on 1 November 2016. In 2014, he also had a brief stint with Chilean club Deportes Concepción.

In December 2024, Quiroz assumed as manager of Gimnasia y Tiro.
