= Rubén Forestello =

Argentine football manager

Personal information
- Full name: Rubén Dario Forestello
- Date of birth: 15 February 1971 (age 55)
- Place of birth: Realicó, Argentina
- Height: 1.85 m (6 ft 1 in)
- Position: Forward

Senior career*
| Years | Team | Apps | (Gls) |
| 1991–1993 | Almirante Brown | | |
| 1993–1994 | Deportivo Armenio | 33 | (7) |
| 1994–1995 | Sportivo Dock Sud | 30 | (7) |
| 1995–1996 | Tristán Suárez | 34 | (9) |
| 1996 | Almirante Brown | | |
| 1997 | Sarmiento | 15 | (3) |
| 1998–1999 | El Porvenir | | |
| 1999–2001 | Banfield | 62 | (22) |
| 2002 | Deportivo Italchacao | 12 | (4) |
| 2002–2004 | Atlético Rafaela | 67 | (22) |
| 2004 | San Martín de Mendoza | 18 | (6) |
| 2005 | Emelec | 11 | (4) |
| 2005–2006 | El Porvenir | | |

Managerial career
- 2006: El Porvenir
- 2008–11: Unión de Sunchales
- 2011–2012: Santamarina
- 2012: Atlético Rafaela
- 2013: San Martín de San Juan
- 2013: Colón
- 2014: Talleres
- 2014: San Martín de San Juan
- 2015: Nueva Chicago
- 2016–2017: Patronato
- 2017: Olimpo
- 2017–2018: San Martín de Tucumán
- 2018–2019: San Martín de San Juan
- 2020–2021: Nueva Chicago
- 2021: Gimnasia y Tiro
- 2022: Atlético Rafaela
- 2022: Alvarado
- 2023–2024: Gimnasia y Tiro
- 2025: Temperley
- 2026: Patronato
- 2026: Estudiantes de Río Cuarto
- * Club domestic league appearances and goals

Rubén Forestello is an Argentine football manager and former player who played as a forward.
