= Municipal Bank of Rosario =

Bank in Rosario, Argentina

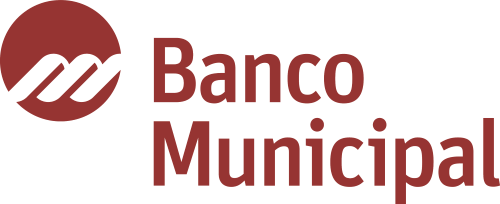
Logo

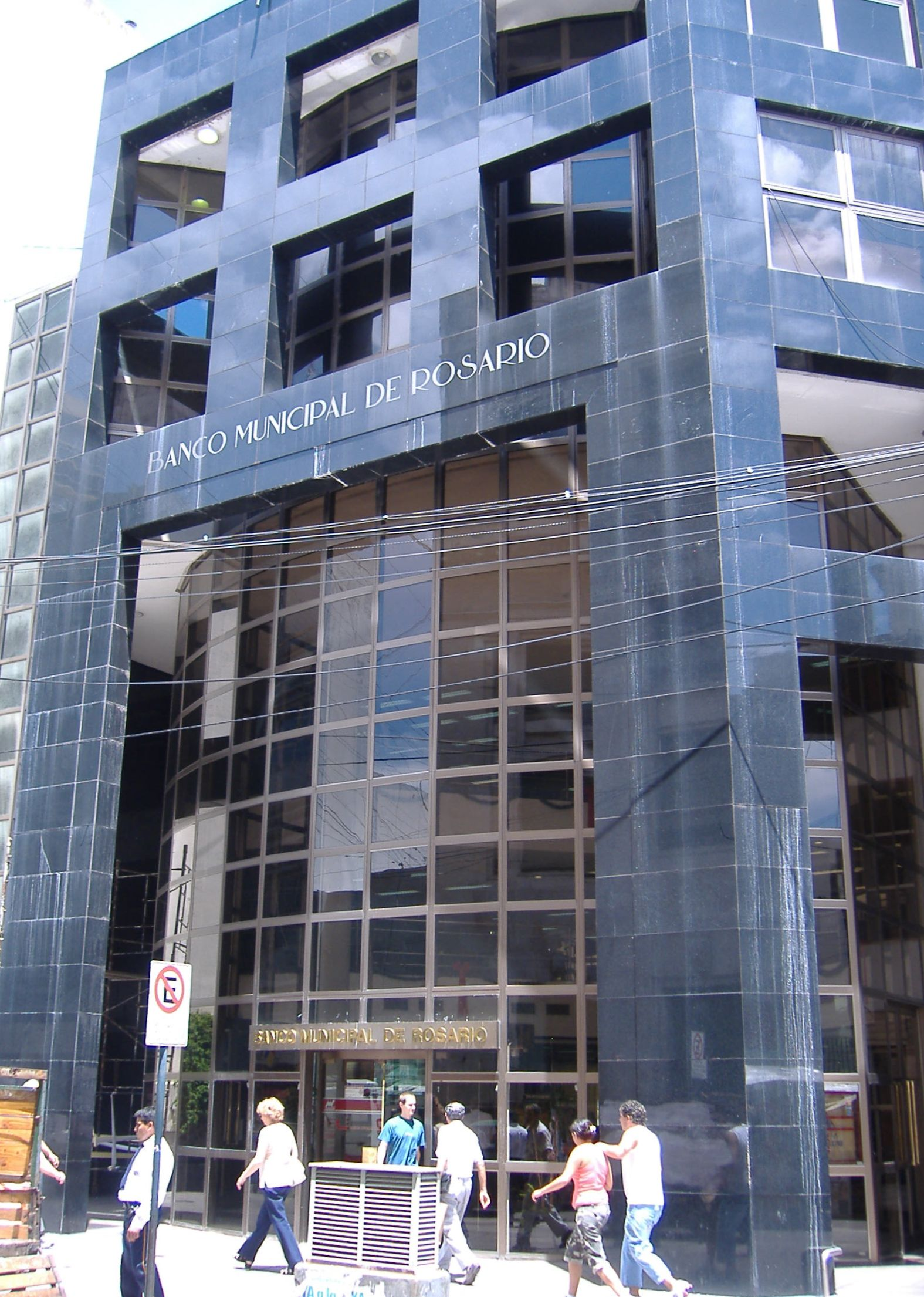
The central offices of the Municipal Bank of Rosario

The Municipal Bank of Rosario (Spanish: Banco Municipal de Rosario, BMR) is a bank in Rosario, province of Santa Fe, Argentina. Its central offices are located in the downtown area, on San Martín St., and there are several additional offices throughout the city. It is focused in small and medium enterprises and other organizations, especially through microcredits, and may be considered an "ethical bank".

The Municipal Bank was founded in 1896 to support the financial needs of the citizens and small businesses in the highly productive region of southern Santa Fe Province, centered in Rosario. At the time, the city had around 92,000 inhabitants and was already the most important port on the Paraná River. The idea of creating a municipal financial institution was expressed in 1893 by mayor Floduardo Grandoli, citing the proliferation of "centers of usury" that exploited those in need of credit, especially the poor (something not addressed by the profile of the Provincial Bank of Santa Fe, which granted loans only to demonstrably solvent persons). Acting on this, the municipal Counseling Commission passed a bill (on 1 February 1895) dictating an "Organic Charter of the Municipal Bank of Loans and Savings Accounts". The bank opened exactly one year later.

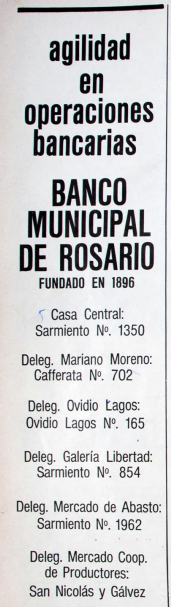
Advertisement of the Municipal Bank of Rosario in the local magazine Boom, August 1968.

The seat of the bank was moved in 1905. Its name was changed to its present form on 14 May 1940 by a municipal bill. Its location was moved again, and for the last time so far, in 1986.

In 2006, after some political controversy, the bank was capitalized by the municipality in order to comply with new regulations dictated by the Central Bank, and transformed into a joint stock company, with only 1% of the stock belonging to the municipal state. A special clause was added, dictating that this minimum share is unchangeable, so as to prevent hypothetical attempts at privatization.

The bank's mission focuses on the management of the finances of the municipal state and the support of the region's small and medium enterprises. At present, it offers loans for a variety of purposes, such as international trade, real estate operations, automobile purchases, and the installation of domestic natural gas lines; it finances the preservation of the architectonic heritage of the city through special loans devoted to the restoration of historical facades; and it offers several forms of insurance, credit cards, and other services. The bank also emits and sells the magnetic stripe cards used as pre-paid tickets for Rosario's urban bus system. Finally, it has agreements with clubs, unions, schools and other institutions.

The associated Municipal Bank of Rosario Foundation organizes cultural activities and manages municipal events. Its professional specialist groups publish studies on a variety of topics (social, economic, ecological, etc.). The Foundation manages an Auditorium at the central offices of the bank, with a capacity of 250 people, which is available for conventions, lectures and film projections.
