= Ricardo Caruso Lombardi =

Argentine football manager

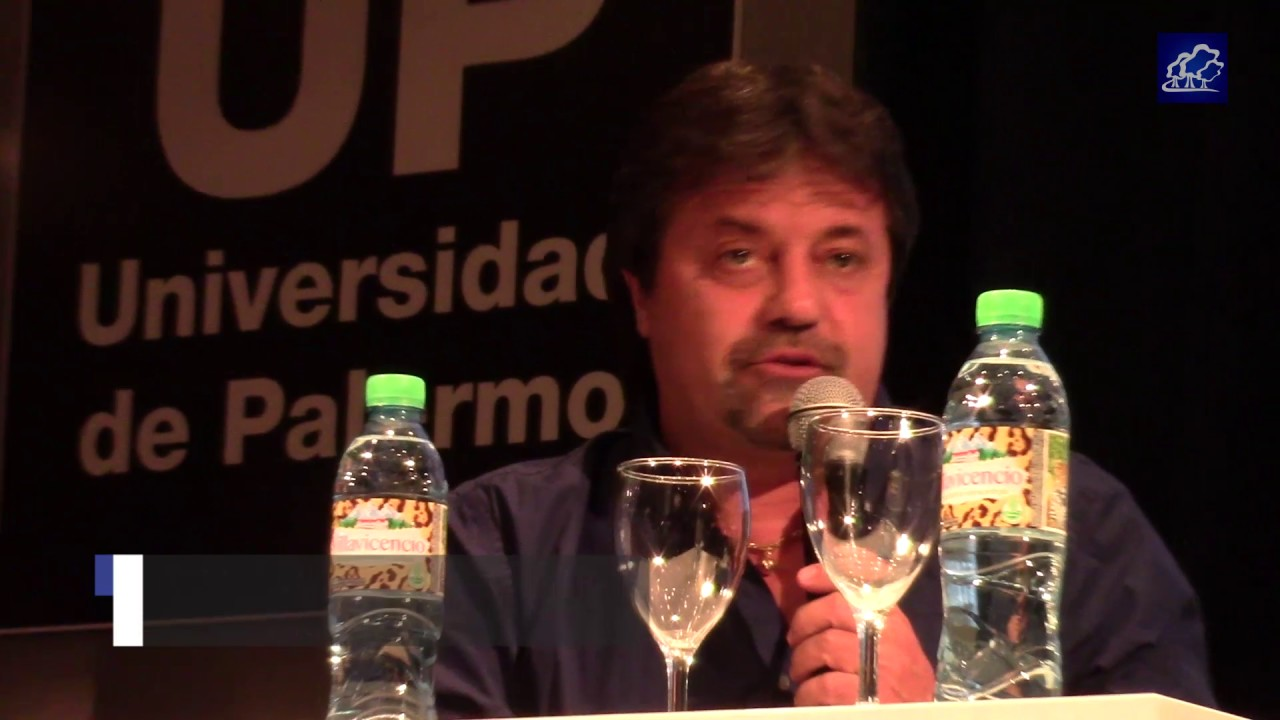
- Ricardo Caruso Lombardi during a talk with students from the University of Palermo

Personal information
- Full name: Ricardo Daniel Caruso Lombardi
- Date of birth: 10 February 1962 (age 64)
- Place of birth: Buenos Aires, Argentina
- Height: 1.66 m (5 ft 5 in)
- Position: Midfielder

Senior career*
Years	Team	Apps	(Gls)
1981	Argentinos Juniors	5	(0)
1982–1983	Deportivo Italiano		
1984	Atlanta		
1985	Deportivo Italiano		
1986–1989	Almagro		
1989–1990	Chacarita Juniors		
1990–1992	Defensores de Belgrano	10	(0)

Managerial career
- 1994–1995: Defensores de Belgrano
- 1995–1996: Sportivo Italiano
- 1996: Estudiantes (BA)
- 1997: Temperley
- 1997–1998: Sportivo Italiano
- 1998–1999: Estudiantes (BA)
- 2000: Platense
- 2001–2002: El Porvenir
- 2002–2003: All Boys
- 2003–2006: Tigre
- 2007: Argentinos Juniors
- 2007–2008: Newell's Old Boys
- 2009: Racing Club
- 2010: Tigre
- 2011–2012: Quilmes
- 2012: San Lorenzo
- 2013: Argentinos Juniors
- 2014: Quilmes
- 2014: Tristán Suárez
- 2015: Arsenal de Sarandí
- 2016: Sarmiento (Junín)
- 2016: Huracán
- 2017: Tigre
- 2019: San Martín Tucumán
- 2019–2020: Belgrano
- 2024: Miramar Misiones
- * Club domestic league appearances and goals

Ricardo Daniel Caruso Lombardi (born 10 February 1962) is an Argentine football manager and former who played as a midfielder.

Caruso Lombardi is best known for saving teams from being relegated to second division.

== Playing career ==
Born in Buenos Aires, Lombardi started his playing career with Argentinos Juniors in 1981. His career was then mostly in the lower leagues of Argentine football apart from 1984 when he played a single season for Club Atlético Atlanta in the Primera Division.

In 1986, he was part of the Deportivo Italiano team that won the Primera B championship.

== Managerial career ==
After retirement, Caruso Lombardi took up coaching, initially in lower league teams. In the 1995–96 season, he won the Primera B Metropolitana (third division) with Sportivo Italiano, and in the 2004–05 he won it again with Tigre.

Caruso Lombardi was then in charge of Argentinos Juniors, until resigning five games into the 2007 Apertura tournament, despite his team's 3–2 win over Boca Juniors only three weeks previously. He was then hired by Newell's Old Boys, with which he obtained his second victory over Boca in the same 2007 Apertura tournament, beating them 1–0.

On 24 February 2009, Caruso Lombardi became Racing Club's head coach, signing a two-year contract. He helped Racing avoid relegation in his first season; however, he resigned in October 2009, after coaching 11 games without a win in the Apertura tournament. After three years, on 17 December 2009, the coach returned to Tigre, replacing Diego Cagna.

Caruso Lombardi has a preference towards using physically tall footballers on all the positions of the field. In 2010, while coaching Tigre, he was accused by one of his players (Juan Camilo Angulo) of requesting a bribe to put him on the first team. The coach denied the truth of the accusations.

On 8 March 2011, Caruso Lombardi was appointed as head coach of Quilmes, with the club languishing at the bottom of the table and fighting relegation. It is expected that he would remain in that role until his contract expired in June 2012. After a successful spell at Quilmes, during the night of 3 April of the next season, he signed a contract with San Lorenzo de Almagro, replacing Leonardo Madelón in the charge, after their bad results.

On 26 February 2019, Lombardi was appointed as the manager of San Martín Tucumán.

== Honours ==
=== Player ===
Deportivo Italiano

- Primera B: 1985–1986

=== Manager ===
Deportivo Italiano

- Primera B Metropolitana: 1995–1996

Tigre

- Primera B Metropolitana: 2004–2005
