= SanCor =

Argentine dairy company

SanCor Cooperativas Unidas Limitada
- Type: Cooperative
- Industry: milk, food
- Founded: 17 September 1938; 88 years ago
- Defunct: April 16, 2026; 7 months ago
- Headquarters: Sunchales, Santa Fe, Argentina
- Products: Dairy products
- Website: sancor.com

SanCor was one of the leading dairy producers in Argentina (along with competitor La Serenísima). It holds one fifth of the total production in the country, and 90% of the Argentine exports of dairy products. It is a large cooperative made up many smaller ones, based on the Argentine "central milk basin" around the border between the provinces of Santa Fe and Córdoba.

SanCor produces milk, powdered milk, cream, cheeses, butter dulce de leche (milk caramel) w

hich are sold under various brand names: SanCor, San Regim, Santa Brígida, Angelita, Granja Blanca and Chelita.

After a long financial crisis, which forced the company to sell several plants and brands, and losing 3,200 employees, SanCor is now producing 10% of its 2015 output. It processes 500,000 liters (130,000 U.S. gal) of milk a month.

== History ==
The cooperative was founded on 17 September 1938 as an association of many cooperative producers in the central area of the country, and grew as its success attracted more members. Its first industrial plant (a butter factory) was opened in 1940, in Sunchales, Santa Fe, where SanCor's administrative headquarters are located today. New plants, producing butter, cheese and dulce de leche, followed during the 1940s. In 1942, the cooperative opened its first factory in the same town. In 1943, they inaugurated the Brinkmann factory in the northeast of the Province of Córdoba, which was specially conditioned to create butter. That same year the production of dulce de leche would begin. In 1940, its first butter factory began operating in Sunchales and from then on it did not stop growing.

In 1953, SanCor opened a branch office in New York City, United States, in order to boost its international trade operations; and in 1956, new branch offices were opened in Buenos Aires and other Argentine cities. In 1986, a daughter company, SanCor do Brasil Produtos Alimentícios Limitada, was founded in São Paulo, Brazil.

In 1994, SanCor became the first Argentine cooperative to issue its own negotiable instruments.

== 2006 financial rescue ==
During the 1990s, SanCor incurred a large debt to finance capital investment. In 1998, the crisis of the dairy market started causing difficulties for the cooperative, which became overwhelming after the collapse of the Argentine economy in 2001. Near the end of 2006, the company was faced with the impossibility of paying up about $167 million. A letter of intent was signed by the firm Adecoagro, partly owned by American financist George Soros. Adecoagro had agreed to provide SanCor with $50 million as work capital plus $70 million to refinance its debt, receiving in exchange the control of 62.5% of the company. Upon concerns from the national government and others, SanCor initially denied it had received any other offers from national investors, but the Petersen Group, led by Argentine entrepreneurs Enrique Eskenazi, Hugo Sigman and Eduardo Eurnekian, claimed it had presented a better offer which had been rejected.

Soon afterwards, Venezuelan president Hugo Chávez visited Argentina and proposed a salvage loan to SanCor, partly in order to pay its debt and partly to finance needed investment, in exchange for milk powder and technical advice. The formal agreement was signed on 11 December 2006 between SanCor and the Banco de Desarrollo Económico y Social de Venezuela, an autonomous financial agent of the Venezuelan government. SanCor will not have to cease being a cooperative, as it would have happened with the alternative offers. The total loan will amount to $135 million, of which $80 million will be repaid with exports of powdered milk, while the other $55 million will be employed as work capital.

== SanCor and UTE ==
In september of 2004., SanCor Cooperativas Unidas Limitada (SanCor) and Dairy Partners Americas Argentina S.A. (DPAA) created a joint venture (“Unión Transitoria de Empresas”) for the production, distribution and commercialization in Argentina of yogurt, fresh cheese (ricotta, petit suisse and cream cheese), fermented milk, custards, deserts and fluid and flavored milks.

SanCor and DPAA have equal shares in the UTE called “UNION SANCOR CUL / DPAA UNION TRANSITORIA DE EMPRESAS.” As part of the alliance, it was agreed that the UTE's production will be made in plants owned by SanCor and DPAA.

2009, SanCor purchases the assets of the union corporation by SanCor / DPAA.
