= Estadio 15 de Abril =

Football stadium in Santa Fe, Argentina

Coordinates: 31°37′55″S 60°42′57″W

15 de Abril Stadium
- Estadio 15 de Abril
- Estadio La Avenida

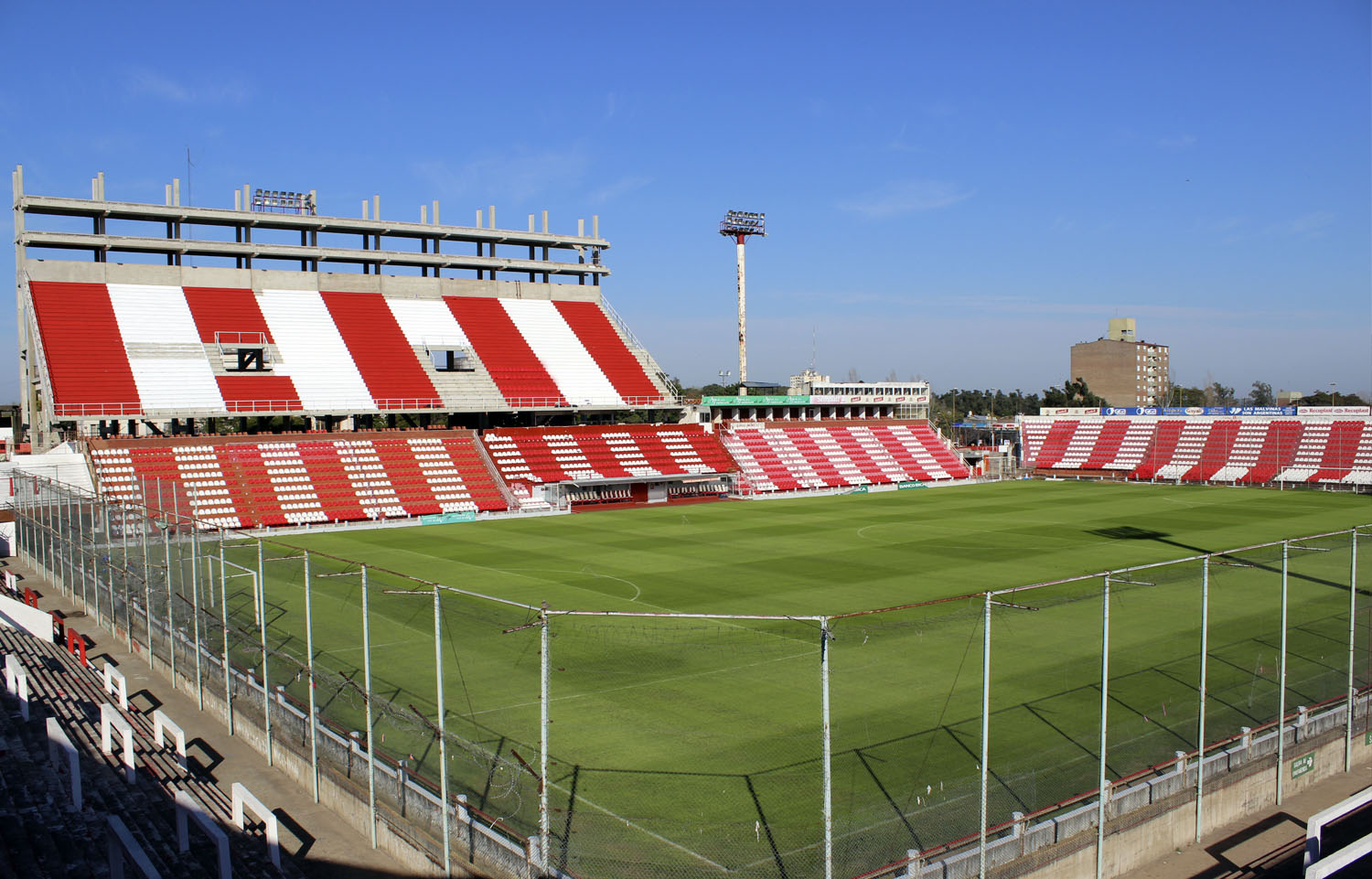
- View of the stadium in 2017
- Interactive map of 15 de Abril Stadium
- Address: Av. Vicente López y Planes 3513; Santa Fe; Argentina
- Owner: C.A. Unión
- Capacity: 29,000
- Surface: Grass
- Field size: 104,5 x 70,3 m

Construction
- Built: 1926–29
- Opened: 28 April 1929; 97 years ago
- Renovated: 1931, 1943, 1975, 1981, 2003, 2019

Tenant
- CA Unión (1929–present)

Website
- clubaunion.com.ar/estadio

The 15 de Abril is a stadium in Santa Fe, Argentina. It is currently used primarily for football matches and it is the home ground of club Unión de Santa Fe.

The venue bears his name in homage to the date the club was founded. It was the first made of cement and with artificial lighting in the region. Currently it has a capacity of 29,000.

The Estadio 15 de Abril was the fourth and last move that Unión had, which, during its first two decades of life, had gone through two of its own playing fields. The first was the now non-existent Santa Coloma square, the second where the Nuestra Señora del Calvario School currently operates at the intersection of Urquiza and Suipacha streets; while the third was where the rectory of the Universidad Nacional del Litoral is located today in

== History ==
At the beginning, Unión played their home matches at Plaza Santa Coloma. In April 1908, the club moved to San Jerónimo and Boulevard Pellegrini streets, rented for m$n80. In 1926, the Government of Argentina led by Marcelo T. de Alvear granted Universidad Nacional del Litoral the land on San Jerónimo and Pellegrini, which resulted in Unión being evicted from the field. In May 1928, the club acquired a land to build their own stadium.

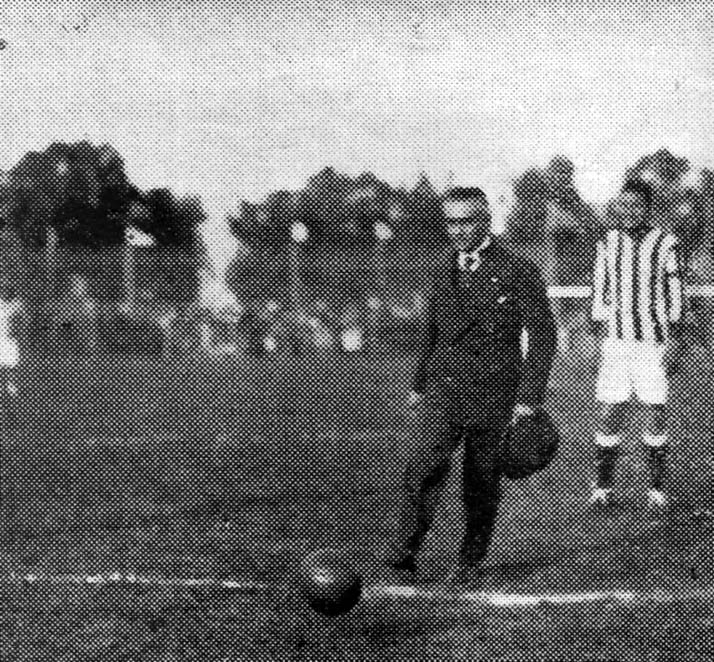
Governor of Santa Fe Province, Pedro Gómez Cello, kicking off in the inauguration of the stadium

In 1928 the club began the works that would lead to the construction of the current football stadium. The idea of the club executives was to inaugurate the venue on the same date that the club celebrated its 22nd. anniversary, but due to calendar and weather reasons, the "15 de Abril Stadium" was finally inaugurated on Sunday, 28 April 1929. That day, the celebration It began in the morning with a parade of sports delegations, municipal and provincial political presences, a basketball match, plus a preliminary football match between Atlético de Rafaela and San Lorenzo de Esperanza. The main match would come later, when Unión played against a team of the Asociación Amateurs de Football, a dissident governing body that had been established in 1926.

On the day of its inauguration, a plaque was also placed in the stands (current members' sector) in honor of the former player and deceased at that time, Albino García, and for a couple of years the stadium was known as the "Albino García Stadium" since the only grandstand was named after him. Nevertheless, when the club inaugurated new stands and as time went by, the fans forgot about the player's name.

On 3 November 1931, the club decided to install the first lighting towers in its stadium that existed in Santa Fe. The work was carried out by the Siemens Company, demanding an investment of m$n22,000, a high amount for that time. The first night game in Santa Fe was played on Saturday, 12 December 1931, in a match vs Rosario Central that Unión won 3–2.

On 18 December 1943, in a friendly match of the Santa Fe derby, the sector of the north stand (where the visitor supporters were) collapsed, causing several fans to end up injured and hospitalized. After that incident the club decided to refurbish the stadium to replace the wooden stands by other made of cement.

In the 1950s the club would begin several renovations and expansions in the stadium with the idea of increasing its capacity to 80,000 people. Nevertheless, the idea fell apart when there was a change of governor in the province and the loan for the club was canceled. By 1954 the stadium had a capacity for 30,000 people, being the largest stadium in the city-

After the sells of some notable players in middle 1970s (Hugo Gatti and Ernesto Mastrángelo to Boca Juniors, Leopoldo Luque to River Plate, among others), the club received incomes that allowed it to remodel and expand the stadium.

Unión drew an average home attendance of 29,753 in the 2024 Argentine Primera División.

== Gallery ==
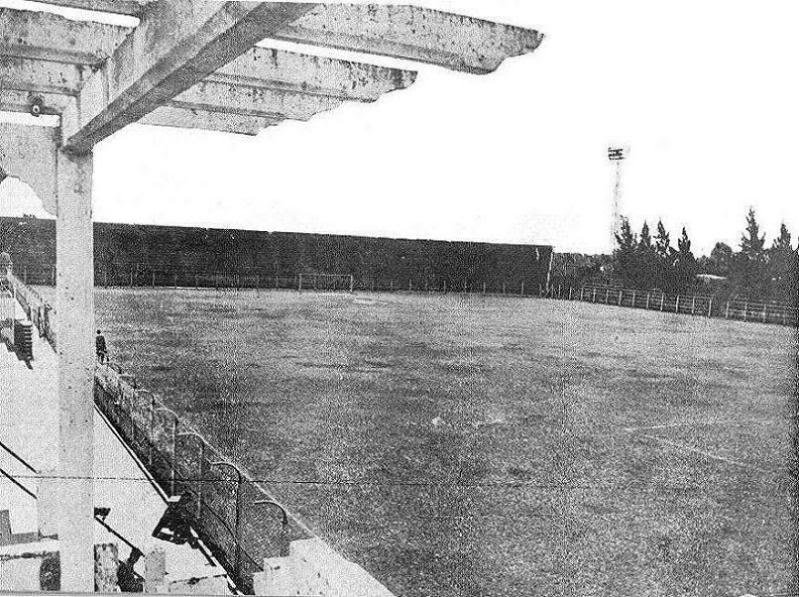
The stadium in 1940

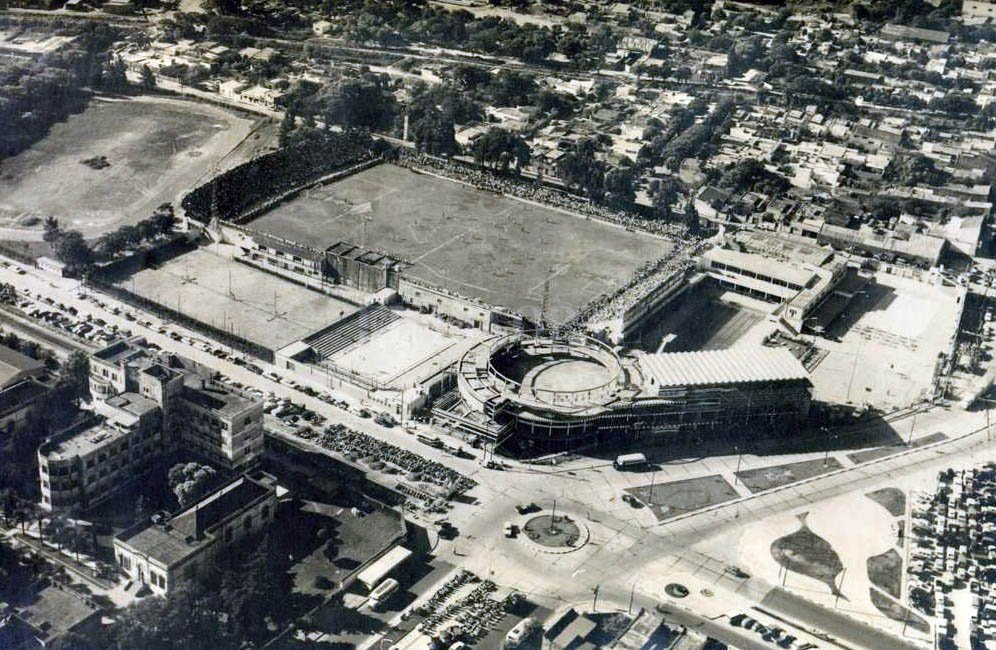
Aerial view, 1966

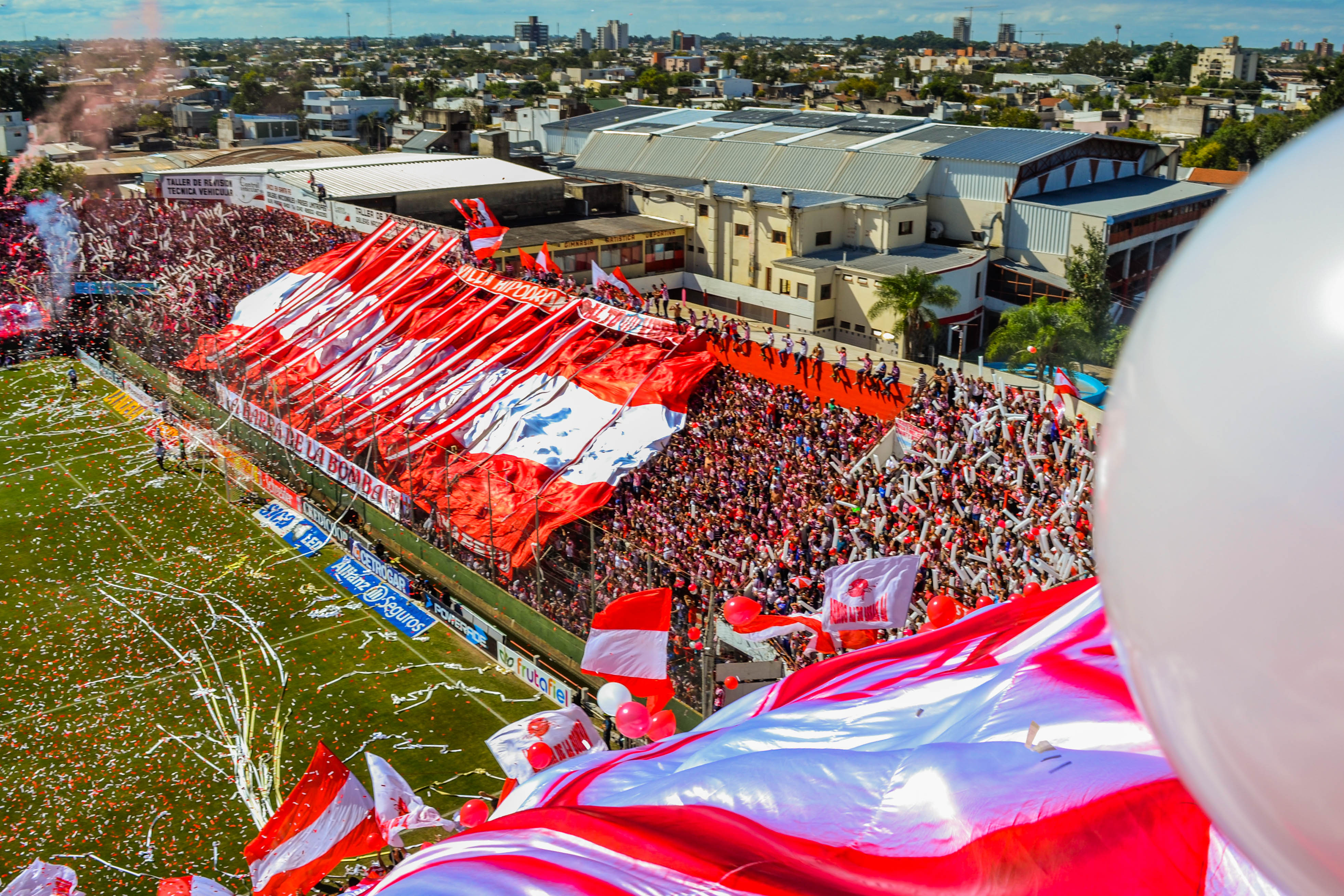
Supporters, 2016

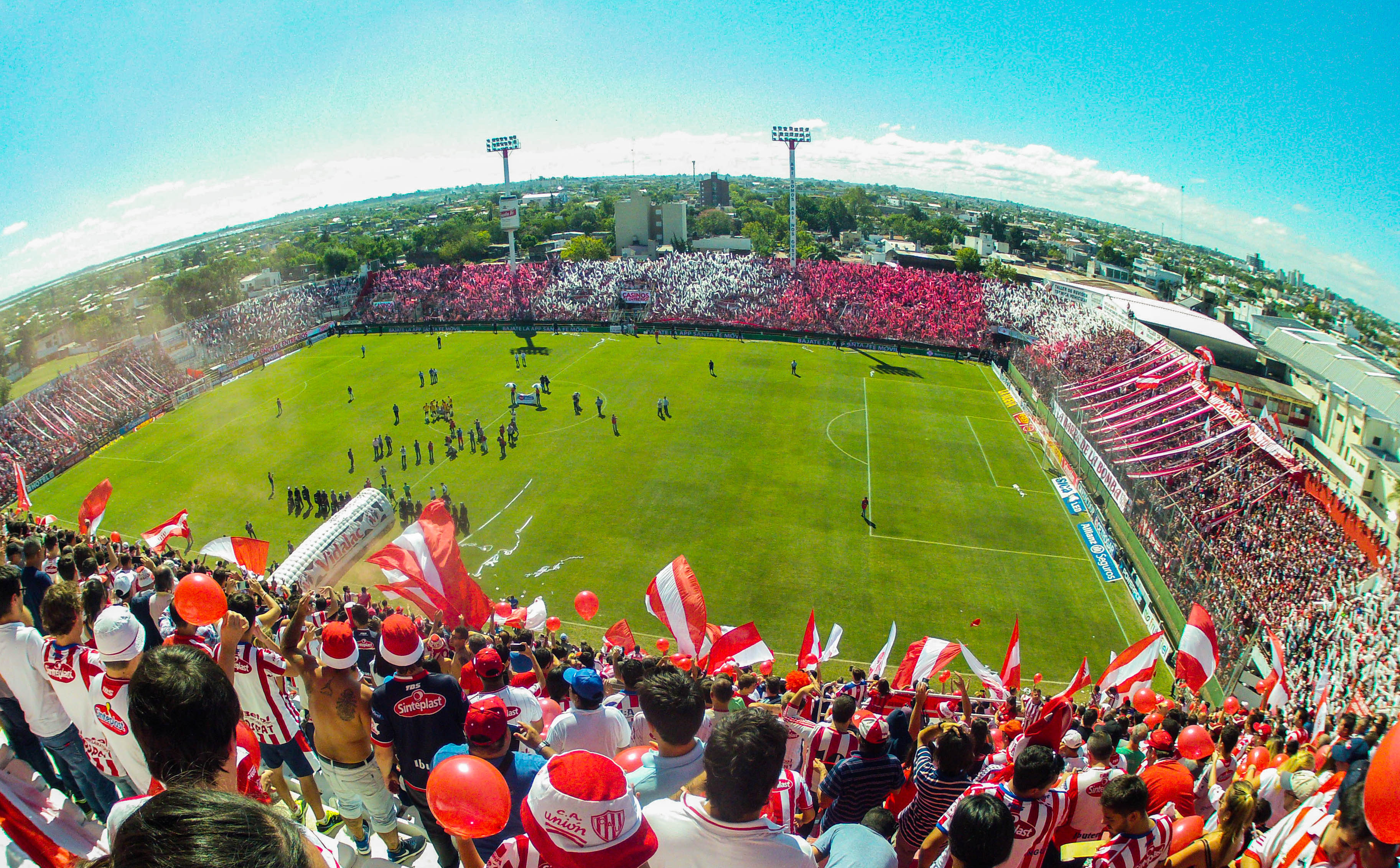
Panorama, 2016

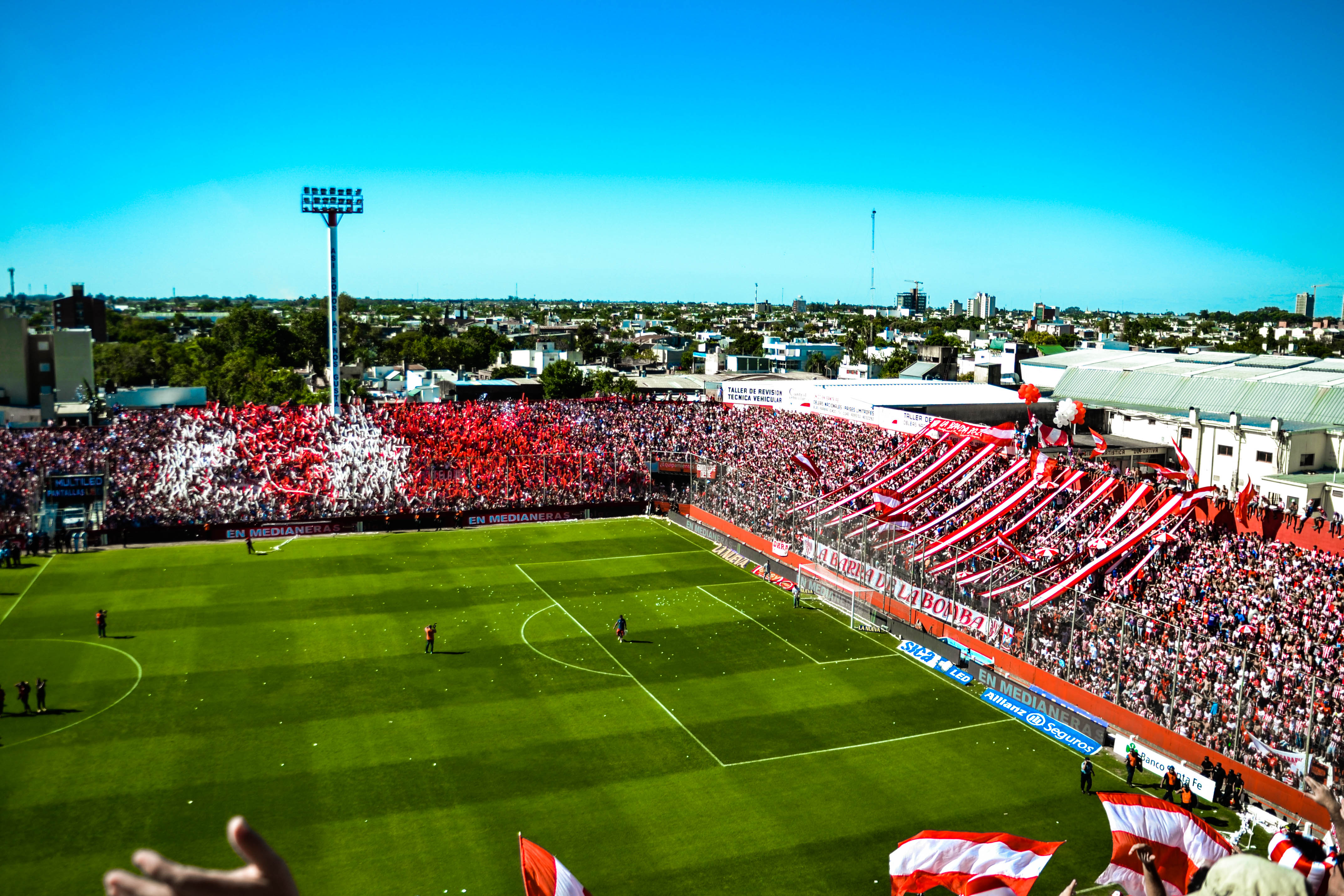
Football match, 2017

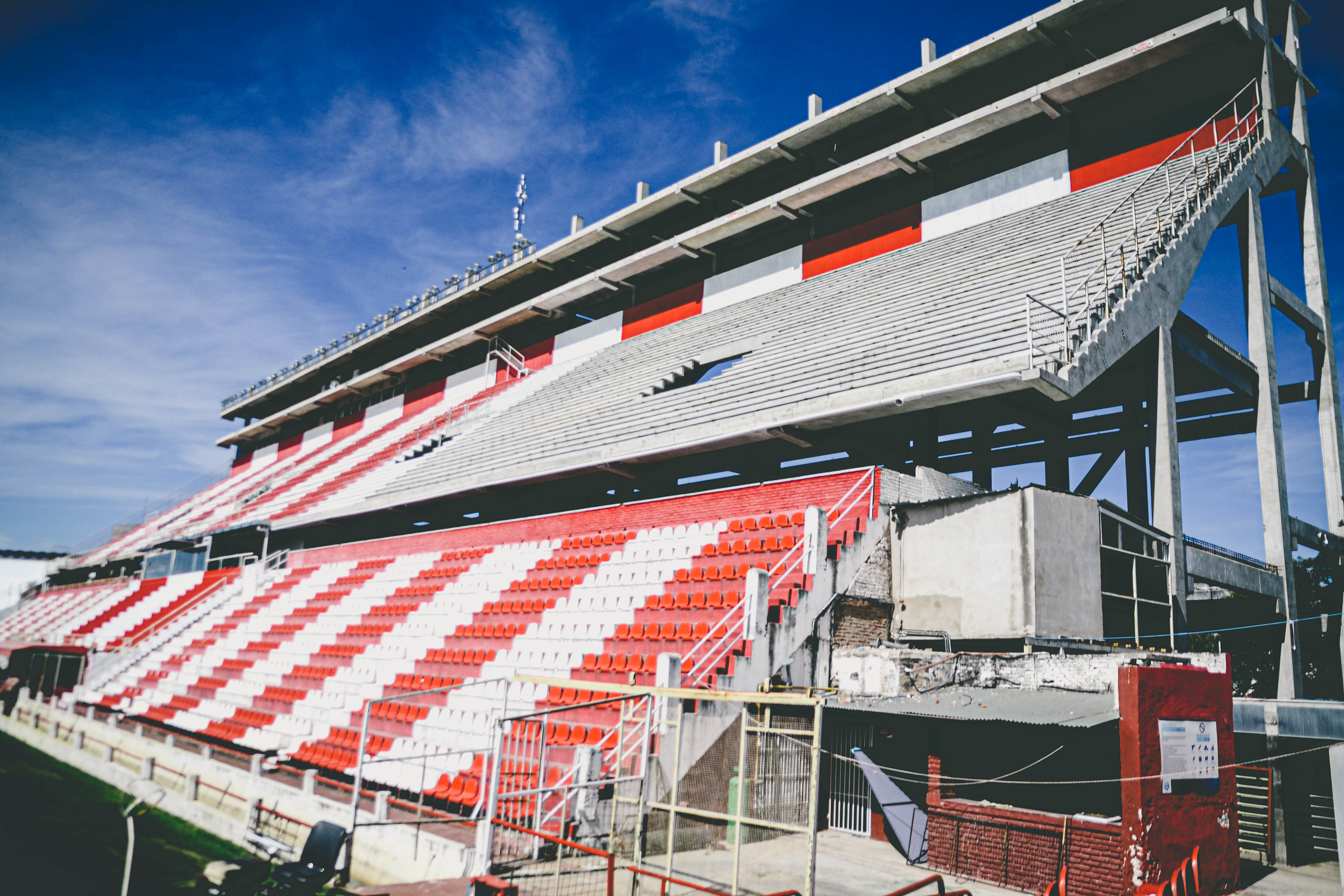
Grandstand, 2021
