= 2015 Club Atlético Independiente season =

Independiente
2015 season
- President: Hugo Moyano
- Manager: (Argentina) Jorge Almiron (until 26 May) (Argentina) Fernando Berón (Interim) (Argentina) Mauricio Pellegrino (from 4 June)
- Stadium: Estadio Libertadores de América
- Primera División: Liguilla Pre-Libertadores Final (5th)
- Copa Argentina: Elimited In Round of 16
- Copa Sudamericana: Elimited Quarterfinals
- Top goalscorer: League: (Argentina) Lucas Albertengo (9); All: (Argentina) Lucas Albertengo (10)

The 2015 season Independiente Participate in the Argentine Primera División, Copa Argentina and the Copa Sudamericana .

== Club ==
=== Kits ===
- Supplier: Puma SE
- Main Sponsor:: (Argentina) Correo OCA / (Argentina)
- Secondary Sponsor: (Argentina) Audifarm Salud

| Home Kit | Away Kit | 3rd Kit | GK kit |

=== Squad information ===
| N | Pos. | Nat. | Name | Age | EU | Since | App | Goals | Ends | Transfer fee | Notes |
|---|---|---|---|---|---|---|---|---|---|---|---|
| 1 | GK | (Argentina) | Diego Rodriguez | 37 | EU | 2011 | 128 | 9 | 2017 | Youth system | Second nationality: Italy |
| 2 | CB | (Argentina) | Hernán Pellerano | 32 | EU | 2015 | 18 | 0 | 2018 | 9,000,000 $ | Second nationality: Italy |
| 3 | LB | (Argentina) | Lucas Villalba | 38 | Non-EU | 2012 | 48 | 0 | 2017 | Youth system | |
| 4 | DM | (Argentina) | Jorge Ortiz | 42 | Non-EU | 2015 | 18 | 0 | 2018 | 11,750,000 $ | |
| 5 | DM | (Argentina) | Franco Bellocq | 48 | Non-EU | 2014 | 27 | 0 | 2016 | Youth system | |
| 6 | CB | (Argentina) | Emanuel Aguilera | 33 | Non-EU | 2014 | 20 | 1 | 2017 | 260,000 $ | |
| 7 | LW | (Argentina) | Francisco Pizzini | 33 | Non-EU | 2011 | 57 | 4 | 2017 | Youth system | |
| 8 | CM | (Argentina) | Jesús Méndez | 42 | Non-EU | 2014 | 37 | 2 | 2015 | 450,000 $ | |
| 9 | CF | (Uruguay) | Diego Vera | 32 | Non-EU | 2015 | 22 | 8 | 2018 | 15,000,000 $ | |
| 10 | RW | (Uruguay) | Cristian Rodríguez | 31 | EU | 2015 | 12 | 2 | 2017 | 1,000,000 $ | Second nationality: Italy |
| 11 | MF | (Argentina) | Federico Mancuello (captain) | 37 | EU | 2008 | 160 | 21 | 2016 | Youth system | Second nationality: Italy |
| 12 | GK | (Argentina) | Facundo Daffonchio | 36 | Non-EU | 2011 | 0 | 0 | 2016 | Youth system | |
| 13 | GK | (Argentina) | Gonzalo Rehak | 33 | Non-EU | 2014 | 0 | 0 | N/A | Youth system | |
| 14 | CB | (Argentina) | Víctor Cuesta | 37 | Non-EU | 2014 | 58 | 2 | 2017 | 160,000 $ | |
| 15 | CB | (Argentina) | Jorge Figal | 32 | Non-EU | 2014 | 24 | 0 | 2017 | Youth system | |
| 16 | RM | (Argentina) | Christian Ortiz | 34 | Non-EU | 2012 | 1 | 1 | 2017 | Youth system | |
| 17 | RM | (Argentina) | Juan Martínez Trejo | 32 | Non-EU | 2012 | 26 | 2 | 2017 | Youth system | |
| 18 | FW | (Argentina) | Lucas Albertengo | 35 | Non-EU | 2015 | 30 | 10 | 2018 | 2,200,000 € | |
| 19 | CF | (Argentina) | Juan Martín Lucero | 34 | Non-EU | 2014 | 39 | 8 | 2017 | 1,200,000 € | |
| 21 | LB | (Argentina) | Emiliano Papa | 44 | EU | 2015 | 20 | 0 | 2017 | 1,400,000 $ | Second nationality: Italy |
| 22 | GK | (Argentina) | Germán Montoya | 43 | Non-EU | 2014 | 1 | 0 | 2015 | 270,000 $ | |
| 24 | CB | (Paraguay) | Cristian Báez | 36 | Non-EU | 2010 | 14 | 1 | 2016 | Youth system | |
| 25 | CB | (Argentina) | Aléxis Zárate | 32 | Non-EU | 2013 | 17 | 1 | 2017 | Youth system | |
| 26 | RB | (Argentina) | Gustavo Toledo | 37 | Non-EU | 2015 | 36 | 0 | 2018 | 8800,000 $ | |
| 27 | LM | (Uruguay) | Diego Rodríguez | 37 | EU | 2015 | 12 | 1 | 2018 | 1,200,000 $ | Second nationality: Italy |
| 28 | RW | (Argentina) | Jorge Pereyra Díaz | 36 | Non-EU | 2015 | 6 | 0 | 2015 | Free | |
| 29 | LW | (Argentina) | Martín Benítez | 32 | Non-EU | 2011 | 72 | 10 | 2017 | Youth system | |
| 30 | CB | (Uruguay) | Mauricio Victorino | 44 | EU | 2015 | 12 | 1 | 2015 | 800,000 $ | Second nationality: Italy |
| 31 | LB | (Argentina) | Nicolás Tagliafico | 34 | EU | 2015 | 38 | 1 | 2018 | 1,200,000 $ | Second nationality: Italy |
| 32 | RW | (Argentina) | Matías Pisano | 34 | EU | 2013 | 93 | 7 | 2017 | 400,000 $ | Second nationality: Italy |
| 33 | LM | (Argentina) | Claudio Aquino | 35 | Non-EU | 2015 | 20 | 0 | 2018 | 1,150,000 $ | |
| 34 | DM | (Argentina) | Julián Vitale | 31 | Non-EU | 2015 | 19 | 1 | N/A | Youth system | |
| 36 | LW | (Argentina) | Ezequiel Vidal | 31 | Non-EU | 2015 | 7 | 0 | N/A | Youth system | |

- Last updated: 30 November 2015
- Source: Clubaindependiente.com, Futbolpasion.com, Copa Argentina
- Ordered by squad number.

=== Current coaching staff ===
| Position | Staff |
|---|---|
| Coach | (Argentina) Mauricio Pellegrino |
| Assistant Coach | (Argentina) Carlos Compagnucci |
| Assistant Coach | (Spain) Xavi Tamarit |
| Fitness Coach | (Argentina) Gabriel Macaya |
| Goalkeepers coach | (Argentina) Pablo Cavallero |
| Reserve team Coach | (Argentina) Fernando Berón |
| Youth Department | (Argentina) Jorge Griffa |
| Doctor | (Argentina) Dr Luis Chiaradia |
| Doctor | (Argentina) Dr Sergio Mauro |
| Kinesiology | (Argentina) Gabriel De Brasi |
| Kinesiology | (Argentina) Julio Zunino |
| Massageist | (Argentina) Christian Trobec |
| Props | (Argentina) Daniel Sotelo |
| Props | (Argentina) Mariano Bagtano |

Source: clubaindependiente.com

== Transfers ==
=== Player In ===
| No | Name | Nation | Pos | Moving From | Type | Fee (in €) |
Summer
| 21 | Emiliano Papa | (Argentina) | Defender | (Argentina) Vélez Sarsfield | Free transfer | Free |
| 18 | Lucas Albertengo | (Argentina) | Forward | (Argentina) Atlético Rafaela | Transfer (80%) | 200,000 |
| 27 | Diego Rodríguez | (Uruguay) | Midfielder | (Argentina) Godoy Cruz | Transfer (50%) | 1,000,000 |
| 33 | Claudio Aquino | (Argentina) | Midfielder | (Argentina) Godoy Cruz | Transfer (50%) | 1,000,000 |
| 20 | José Valencia | (Colombia) | Forward | (Argentina) Rosario Central | Loan In | 1,000,000 |
| 17 | Gabriel Graciani | (Argentina) | Midfielder | (Argentina) Estudiantes (LP) | Loan In | 600,000 |
| 26 | Gustavo Toledo | (Argentina) | Defender | (Argentina) Banfield | Transfer | 850,000 |
| 31 | Nicolás Tagliafico | (Argentina) | Defender | (Argentina) Banfield | Transfer (50%) | 1,000,000 |
| 30 | Mauricio Victorino | (Uruguay) | Defender | (Brazil) Palmeiras | Free transfer | Free |
Winter
| 24 | Cristian Báez | (Paraguay) | Defender | (Chile) Deportes Iquique | Loan Return | Free |
| 4 | Jorge Ortiz | (Argentina) | Midfielder | (Argentina) Lanús | Transfer | 1,750,000 |
| 2 | Hernán Pellerano | (Uruguay) | Defender | (Argentina) Vélez Sarsfield | Transfer | 900,000 |
| 28 | Jorge Pereyra Díaz | (Argentina) | Forward | (Malaysia) Johor | Loan In | Free |
| 9 | Diego Vera | (Argentina) | Forward | (Argentina) Estudiantes (LP) | Transfer | 1,500,000 |
| 10 | Cristian Rodríguez | (Uruguay) | Midfielder | (Spain) Atlético de Madrid | Free transfer | Free |

Total spending: ▼€127,350,000

=== Player Out ===
| No | Name | Nation | Pos | Moving to | Type | Fee (in €) |
Summer
| 10 | Federico Insúa | (Argentina) | Midfielder | (Colombia) Millonarios | End of contract | Free |
| 17 | Patricio Vidal | (Argentina) | Forward | (Chile) Unión La Calera | Loan Out | 1,000,000 |
| 34 | Sergio Escudero | (Argentina) | Defender | (Argentina) Belgrano | End of contract | Free |
| 9 | Sebastián Penco | (Argentina) | Forward | (Colombia) Once Caldas | End of contract | Free |
| 16 | Jorge Iván Pérez | (Argentina) | Midfielder | (Portugal) Freamunde | End of contract | Free |
| 33 | Leonel Miranda | (Argentina) | Midfielder | (United States) Houston Dynamo | Loan Out | 400,000 |
| 5 | Marcelo Vidal | (Argentina) | Midfielder | (Argentina) Olimpo | Loan Out | 150,000 |
| 7 | Rodrigo Gómez | (Argentina) | Midfielder | (Argentina) Quilmes | Loan Out | 1,000,000 |
| 14 | Fabián Monserrat | (Argentina) | Midfielder | (Argentina) Crucero del Norte | Loan Out | 100,000 |
| 6 | Sergio Ojeda | (Argentina) | Defender | (Argentina) Gimnasia (J) | Loan Out | 200,000 |
| 35 | Maximiliano Herrera | (Argentina) | Forward | (Argentina) Arsenal | End of contract | Free |
| 23 | Daniel Montenegro | (Argentina) | Midfielder | (Argentina) Huracán | End of contract | Free |
Winter
| 2 | Cristian Tula | (Argentina) | Defender | Free Agent | End of contract | Free |
| 28 | Gabriel Vallés | (Argentina) | Defender | Free Agent | End of contract | Free |
| 17 | Gabriel Graciani | (Argentina) | Midfielder | (Argentina) Atlético Rafaela | Loan Out | Free |
| - | Adrián Fernández | (Paraguay) | Forward | (Paraguay) Club Libertad | Loan Out | Free |
| 4 | Néstor Breitenbruch | (Argentina) | Defender | (Argentina) Quilmes | Loan Out | Free |
| 9 | Claudio Riaño | (Argentina) | Forward | (Argentina) Unión | Released | Free |
| 20 | José Valencia | (Argentina) | Forward | Free Agent | Released | Free |

Total Income ▲: €2,850,000

Net income: ▼€124,500,000

=== Players out on loan ===
| No | Name | Nation | Pos | Destination | Finish at |
Summer
| 17 | Patricio Vidal | (Argentina) | Forward | (Chile) Unión La Calera | 30-06-2016 |
| 33 | Leonel Miranda | (Argentina) | Midfielder | (United States) Houston Dynamo | 31-12-2015 |
| 5 | Marcelo Vidal | (Argentina) | Midfielder | (Argentina) Club Olimpo | 31-12-2015 |
| 7 | Rodrigo Gómez | (Argentina) | Midfielder | (Argentina) Quilmes | 30-06-2016 |
| 14 | Fabián Monserrat | (Argentina) | Midfielder | (Argentina) Crucero del Norte | 31-12-2015 |
| 6 | Sergio Ojeda | (Argentina) | Defender | (Argentina) Gimnasia (J) | 31-12-2015 |
Winter
| 17 | Gabriel Graciani | (Argentina) | Midfielder | (Argentina) Atlético Rafaela | 30-06-2016 |
| - | Adrián Fernández | (Paraguay) | Forward | (Paraguay) Libertad | 30-06-2016 |
| 4 | Néstor Breitenbruch | (Argentina) | Defender | (Argentina) Quilmes | 31-12-2015 |
Previous seasons
| - | Lucas Villafáñez | (Argentina) | Midfielder | (Greece) Panetolikos F.C. | 30-06-2016 |
| - | Leonel Buter | (Argentina) | Forward | (Argentina) Chacarita Juniors | 30-06-2016 |

== Pre-season ==
Win Draw Loss Postponed

=== Copa De Oro ===
| 15 January 2015 Copa De Oro | Independiente | 1 – 0 | Estudiantes | Mar del Plata, Argentina |
| 22:10 | Lucero 52'; Néstor Breitenbruch (yellow card) 68' | Report | Ezequiel Cerutti (yellow card) 54'; Leonardo Gil (yellow card) 68'; Paulo Rosales (yellow card) 73' | Stadium: Estadio José María Minella; Referee: Federico Beligoy |

| 27 January 2015 Copa De Oro | Independiente | 0 – 4 | River Plate | Mar del Plata, Argentina |
| 22:10 | Méndez (red card) 45'; Mancuello (yellow card) 30'; Víctor Cuesta (yellow card) 70' | Report | Fernando Cavenaghi 21'; Gonzalo Martínez (yellow card) 37'; Mora 52'; Balanta (yellow card) 69'; Mayada 74'; Pisculichi 85' | Stadium: Estadio José María Minella; Referee: Fernando Rapallini |

Standings

| Pos | Club | Pld | W | D | L | F | A | GD | Pts |
|---|---|---|---|---|---|---|---|---|---|
| 1 | River Plate | 2 | 1 | 1 | 0 | 4 | 0 | 4 | 4 |
| 2 | Independiente | 2 | 1 | 0 | 1 | 1 | 4 | -3 | 3 |
| 3 | Estudiantes | 2 | 0 | 1 | 1 | 0 | 1 | -1 | 1 |

=== Copa De Avellaneda ===
| 1 February 2015 Copa De Avellaneda | Independiente | 0 – 2 | Racing Club | Mar del Plata, Argentina |
| 22:10 | Víctor Cuesta (yellow card) 43'; Emanuel Aguilera (yellow card) 47'; Benítez (yellow card) 63'; Mancuello (yellow card) 68'; Papa (yellow card) 70' | Report | Milito 40'; Videla (yellow card) 45'; Bou 49'; Acevedo (yellow card) 63' | Stadium: Estadio José María Minella; Referee: Pablo Lunati |

=== Friendly ===
==== Summer ====
Win Draw Loss Postponed

| 10 January 2015 Training | Independiente (Argentina) | 0 – 0 | (Paraguay) Cerro Porteño | Pilar |
| 9:30 | | Report | | Stadium: Country Mapuche |

| 21 January 2015 Training | Independiente | 1 – 0 | Villa Dálmine | Pilar |
| | Albertengo 51' | Report | | Stadium: Country Mapuche; Referee: Marcelo Picullo |
Note: Play two halves of 30 minutes.

| 21 January 2015 Training | Independiente | 1 – 0 | Villa Dálmine | Pilar |
| | Benítez 59' | Report | | Stadium: Country Mapuche; Referee: Marcelo Picullo |
Note: Play two halves of 30 minutes.

| 7 February 2015 Training | Independiente | 2 – 0 | Guillermo Brown | Avellaneda |
| 9:30 | Mancuello 4'; Diego Rodriguez 28' (pen.) | Report | | Stadium: Libertadores de América; Referee: Miguel Gramajo |
Note: Play two halves of 25 minutes.

| 7 February 2015 Training | Independiente | 2 – 0 | Guillermo Brown | Avellaneda |
| 11:00 | Aquino; Benítez | Report | | Stadium: Libertadores de América; Referee: Miguel Gramajo |
Note: Play two halves of 25 minutes.

| 15 May 2015 Training | Independiente | 0 – 1 | Club Camioneros | Avellaneda |
| | | Report | Martín Dopazo 37' | Stadium: Libertadores de América; Referee: Miguel Gramajo |
Note: Play two halves of 30 minutes.

| 15 May 2015 Training | Independiente | 2 – 0 | Club Camioneros | Avellaneda |
| | Lucero 30', 55' | Report | | Stadium: Libertadores de América; Referee: Miguel Gramajo |
Note: Play two halves of 30 minutes.

==== Winter ====
Win Draw Loss Postponed

| 27 June 2015 Training | Independiente (Argentina) | 1 – 0 | (Paraguay) Club Libertad | Avellaneda |
| 10:00 | Benítez 56' | | | Stadium: Libertadores de América |
Note: Play two halves of 30 minutes.

| 1 July 2015 Training | Independiente | 2 – 0 | Vélez Sarsfield | Avellaneda |
| | Diego Rodriguez 38' (pen.); José Valencia 49' | Report | | Stadium: Libertadores de América |

| 4 July 2015 Training | Independiente | 1 – 1 | Sarmiento | Avellaneda |
| 9:45 | Albertengo 50' | Report | Nahuel Quiroga 15' | Stadium: Libertadores de América |

| 29 July 2015 Training | Independiente (Argentina) | 3 – 2 | (Uruguay) Nacional | Avellaneda |
| | Juan Martín Lucero; Aquino | | González; Fernández | Stadium: Villa Domínico |

| 29 July 2015 Training | Independiente (Argentina) | 0 – 1 | (Uruguay) Nacional | Avellaneda |
| | | | | Stadium: Villa Domínico |

| 3 August 2015 Training | Independiente (Argentina) | 1 – 0 | (Uruguay) Danubio | Avellaneda |
| | Juan Martín Lucero 16' | Report | | Stadium: Villa Domínico; Referee: Miguel Gramajo |
Note: Play two halves of 30 minutes.

== Competitions ==
=== Overall ===
| Competition | Started round | Current position / round | Final position / round | First match | Last match |
|---|---|---|---|---|---|
| Primera División | – | - | 5th | 14 February 2015 | 22 November 2015 |
| Copa Argentina | Round of 32 | - | Round of 16 | 26 April 2015 | 19 August 2015 |
| 2015 Copa Sudamericana | Second Round | - | Quarterfinals | 26 August 2015 | 29 October 2015 |

=== Overview ===
Updated as of 2 November 2015

| Competition | Record | | | | | | | |
| Competition | G | W | D | L | GF | GA | GD | Win % |
|---|---|---|---|---|---|---|---|---|
| Primera División | 33 | 16 | 12 | 5 | 52 | 27 | +25 | 48.48 |
| Copa Argentina | 3 | 1 | 1 | 1 | 2 | 3 | −1 | 33.33 |
| Copa Sudamericana | 6 | 2 | 3 | 1 | 4 | 3 | +1 | 33.33 |
| Total | 42 | 19 | 16 | 7 | 58 | 33 | +25 | 45.24 |

== Primera División ==
Win Draw Loss Postponed

| 14 February 2015 Round 1 | Newell's Old Boys | 2 – 3 | Independiente | Rosario |
| 20:30 | Rodríguez 53' (pen.); Figueroa 58'; Bernardello (red card) 84' | Report | Víctor Cuesta (yellow card) 8'; Albertengo 10', 32'; Tagliafico (yellow card) 40'; Mancuello (yellow card) 54'; Rodríguez 71' (pen.); Gabriel Graciani (yellow card) 79' | Stadium: Marcelo Bielsa; Referee: Fernando Rapallini |

| 22 February 2015 Round 2 | Independiente | 1 – 1 | Sarmiento | Avellaneda |
| 17:00 | Rodríguez Berrini (yellow card) 37'; Mancuello (yellow card) 68'; Pisano 90+1' | Report | Renzo Spinacci (yellow card) 21'; Nicolás Sánchez (yellow card) 55'; Luna (yellow card) 74'; Héctor Cuevas 83' | Stadium: Libertadores de América; Referee: Federico Beligoy |

| 28 February 2015 Round 3 | Quilmes | 1 – 2 | Independiente | Quilmes |
| 20:10 | Braña (yellow card) 33'; Rodrigo Gómez 38'; Buonanotte (red card) 73'; Romero (yellow card) 77' | Report | Mancuello 8'; Emanuel Aguilera (yellow card) 28'; Pisano (yellow card) 66'; Albertengo 67', (yellow card) 87'; Víctor Cuesta (yellow card) 77' | Stadium: Centenario Dr. José Luis Meiszner; Referee: Patricio Loustau |

| 7 March 2015 Round 4 | Independiente | 1 – 2 | Belgrano | Avellaneda |
| 20:10 | Mancuello 21', (yellow card) 77'; Pisano (yellow card) 42' | Report | Olave (yellow card) 28'; Escudero (yellow card) 32'; Emiliano Rigoni 38'; Farré (yellow card) 50'; Pérez 75' (pen.) | Stadium: Libertadores de América; Referee: Diego Ceballos |

| 14 March 2015 Round 5 | Unión | 1 – 1 | Independiente | Santa Fe |
| 20:15 | Rolando García Guerreño (yellow card) 5'; Emanuel Brítez (yellow card) 17'; Víctor Malcorra 21' (pen.); Enrique Triverio (yellow card) 86' | Report | Rodríguez Berrini (yellow card) 9'; Albertengo 18'; Víctor Cuesta (yellow card) 55'; Aquino (yellow card) 61' | Stadium: 15 de Abril; Referee: Mauro Vigliano |

| 21 March 2015 Round 6 | Independiente | 4 – 0 | Arsenal | Avellaneda |
| 20:15 | Mancuello 1'; Riaño 15'; Rodríguez Berrini (yellow card) 18'; Víctor Cuesta (yellow card) 20', (goal) 82'; Emanuel Aguilera (yellow card) 39'; Albertengo 63' | Report | Matías Zaldivia (yellow card) 22'; Sarulyte (yellow card) 63' | Stadium: Libertadores de América; Referee: Silvio Trucco |

| 28 March 2015 Round 7 | Godoy Cruz | 2 – 2 | Independiente | Mendoza |
| 20:15 | Sebastián Olivares (yellow card) 14'; Juan Garro 26'; Leandro Fernández 57' (pen.) | Report | Riaño 1'; Tagliafico (yellow card) 19'; Rodríguez Berrini 46'; Méndez (yellow card) 47'; Pisano (yellow card) 63'; Papa (yellow card) 64' | Stadium: Malvinas Argentinas; Referee: Sergio Pezzotta |

| 4 April 2015 Round 8 | Independiente | 1 – 1 | Gimnasia (LP) | Avellaneda |
| 20:15 | Tagliafico (yellow card) 31'; Rodríguez Berrini (yellow card) 38'; Albertengo 41' | Report | Facundo Oreja (yellow card) 27'; Barsottini (yellow card) 44'; Coronel 45'; Maximiliano Meza (yellow card) 57'; Brum (yellow card) 86' | Stadium: Libertadores de América; Referee: Juan Pablo Pompei |

| 11 April 2015 Round 9 | San Lorenzo | 1 – 0 | Independiente | Buenos Aires |
| 20:15 | Villalba (yellow card) 34', (goal) 42'; Mercier (yellow card) 41'; Buffarini (yellow card) 53'; Barrientos (yellow card) 82' | Report | Méndez (yellow card) 65' | Stadium: Pedro Bidegain; Referee: Diego Abal |

| 18 April 2015 Round 10 | Independiente | 0 – 0 | Argentinos Juniors | Avellaneda |
| 20:15 | | Report | Patricio Matricardi (yellow card) 14' (yellow-red card) 59'; Torrén (yellow card) 66' | Stadium: Libertadores de América; Referee: Pablo Lunati |

| 3 May 2015 Round 11 | Banfield | 1 – 1 | Independiente | Banfield |
| 16:00 | Mauricio Asenjo 67'; Domingo (yellow card) 69' | Report | Gustavo Toledo (yellow card) 11'; Pisano 14'; Méndez (yellow card) 31'; Víctor Cuesta (yellow card) 90+1'; Franco Bellocq (yellow card) 90+2' | Stadium: Florencio Solá; Referee: Mauro Vigliano |

| 10 May 2015 Round 12 | Independiente | 1 – 1 | Boca Juniors | Avellaneda |
| 21:30 | Albertengo 8'; Mancuello (yellow card) 48' (yellow-red card) 89'; Victorino (yellow card) 60' | Report | Burdisso 37'; Castellani (yellow card) 66'; Sara (yellow card) 82' | Stadium: Libertadores de América; Referee: Silvio Trucco |

| 24 May 2015 Round 13 | Racing Club | 1 – 0 | Independiente | Avellaneda |
| 15:00 | Milito 23' (pen.); Acuña (yellow card) 37'; Videla (yellow card) 52'; Cabral (yellow card) 91' | Report | Méndez (yellow card) 21'; Franco Bellocq (yellow card) 85'; Mancuello (red card) 89' | Stadium: Juan Domingo Perón; Referee: Germán Delfino |

| 30 May 2015 Round 14 | Independiente | 1 – 0 | Tigre | Avellaneda |
| 20:15 | Albertengo 11'; Méndez (yellow card) 75' (yellow-red card) 82' | Report | González Pirez (yellow card) 10'; Arzura (yellow card) 44' | Stadium: Libertadores de América; Referee: Saúl Laverni |

| 7 June 2015 Round 15 | Rosario Central | 1 – 1 | Independiente | Rosario |
| 15:00 | Villagra (yellow card) 20'; Damián Musto (yellow card) 39'; Niell 71' | Report | Emanuel Aguilera 37'; Papa (yellow card) 40'; Julián Vitale (yellow card) 44'; Victorino (yellow card) 59'; Albertengo (yellow card) 66' | Stadium: Dr. Lisandro de la Torre; Referee: Diego Abal |

| 12 July 2015 Round 16 | Independiente | 3 – 1 | Olimpo | Avellaneda |
| 15:00 | Méndez (yellow card) 16'; José Valencia 18'; Martín Benítez 76', 86' | Report | Acosta 21'; Moiraghi (yellow card) 46'; Sills (yellow card) 83' | Stadium: Libertadores de América; Referee: Fernando Rapallini |

| 19 July 2015 Round 17 | Temperley | 0 – 1 | Independiente | Temperley |
| 21:30 | Aguirre (yellow card) 90' | Report | Albertengo 54'; Víctor Cuesta (yellow card) 79' | Stadium: Alfredo Beranger; Referee: Juan Pablo Pompei |

| 25 July 2015 Round 18 | Independiente | 2 – 0 | Atlético de Rafaela | Avellaneda |
| 20:10 | Benítez 6', 66'; Vera (yellow card) 60'; Méndez (yellow card) 74' | Report | Alexander Barboza Ullúa (yellow card) 22'; Ferreyra (yellow card) 67'; Bastía (yellow card) 72' | Stadium: Libertadores de América; Referee: Fernando Echenique |

| 1 August 2015 Round 19 | Colón | 0 – 1 | Independiente | Santa Fe |
| 20:10 | Germán Conti (yellow card) 45'; Vegetti (yellow card) 52'; Benegas (yellow card) 90' | Report | Ortiz (yellow card) 53'; Vera 59' | Stadium: Brigadier General Estanislao López; Referee: Germán Delfino |

| 14 August 2015 Round 20 | Independiente | 1 – 0 | Defensa y Justicia | Avellaneda |
| 21:10 | Méndez (yellow card) 28'; Benítez 30', (yellow card) 89'; Víctor Cuesta (yellow card) 42' | Report | Rius (yellow card) 52'; Rafael Delgado (yellow card) 54'; Gabriel Arias (yellow card) 63'; Julio Rodríguez (yellow card) 90+4' | Stadium: Libertadores de América; Referee: Silvio Trucco |

| 22 August 2015 Round 21 | San Martín (SJ) | 1 – 1 | Independiente | San Juan |
| 18:10 | Ledesma 24' (pen.); Capelli (yellow card) 61'; Nicolás Pelaitay (yellow card) 61' | Report | Jorge Figal (yellow card) 32'; Juan Martínez Trejo (yellow card) 32'; Victorino (yellow card) 62'; Benítez (yellow card) 85' | Stadium: Ingeniero Hilario Sánchez; Referee: Néstor Pitana |

| 30 August 2015 Round 22 | Independiente | 1 – 1 | Estudiantes (LP) | Avellaneda |
| 21:30 | Víctor Cuesta (yellow card) 34'; Vera 52'; Gustavo Toledo (yellow card) 64'; Méndez (yellow card) 85' | Report | Fernández (yellow card) 12', (goal) 65' (pen.); Damonte (yellow card) 38'; Diego Mendoza (yellow card) 65' (yellow-red card) 69'; Domínguez (yellow card) 89' | Stadium: Libertadores de América; Referee: Darío Herrera |

| 5 September 2015 Round 23 | Huracán | 1 – 1 | Independiente | Buenos Aires |
| 18:10 | Bogado (yellow card) 31'; Ramón Ábila 90' | Report | Pellerano (yellow card) 11'; Méndez (yellow card) 41'; Lucero 47', (yellow card) 83'; Gustavo Toledo (yellow card) 74' | Stadium: Tomás Adolfo Ducó; Referee: Diego Ceballos |

| 12 September 2015 Round 24 | Independiente | 3 – 0 | Racing Club | Avellaneda |
| 16:10 | Méndez (yellow card) 19', (goal) 81'; Benítez 32', (yellow card) 45'; Vera (yellow card) 66', (goal) 85' | Report | Acuña (red card) 35'; Bou (yellow card) 47'; Camacho (yellow card) 79'; Romero (yellow card) 89' | Stadium: Libertadores de América; Referee: Patricio Loustau |

| 19 September 2015 Round 25 | Independiente | 2 – 1 | Nueva Chicago | Avellaneda |
| 18:10 | Lucero 13'; Julián Vitale (yellow card) 56'; Gustavo Toledo (yellow card) 78'; Rodríguez 90' | Report | Nicolás Giménez 26', (yellow card) 39'; Lucas Baldunciel (yellow card) 90+1' | Stadium: Libertadores de América; Referee: Mauro Vigliano |

| 27 September 2015 Round 26 | Lanús | 1 – 1 | Independiente | Lanús |
| 21:30 | Gómez (yellow card) 21'; Jorge Figal 41' (o.g.) | Report | Victorino (yellow card) 19'; Lucero 63' | Stadium: Ciudad de Lanús; Referee: Fernando Rapallini |

| 4 October 2015 Round 27 | Independiente | 3 – 0 | River Plate | Avellaneda |
| 21:30 | Tagliafico 4'; Méndez (yellow card) 16'; Ortiz (yellow card) 19'; Rodriguez 34' (pen.); Lucero 86' | Report | Maidana (yellow card) 15'; Pisculichi (red card) 42'; Barovero (yellow card) 45+1' | Stadium: Libertadores de América; Referee: Néstor Pitana |

| 17 October 2015 Round 28 | Crucero del Norte | 0 – 4 | Independiente | Garupá |
| 21:10 | Adrián Alegre (yellow card) 27'; Nicolas Dematei (yellow card) 36'; Cólzera (red card) 45+1' | Report | Vera 21', 60'; Méndez (yellow card) 32'; Pellerano (yellow card) 36'; Rodriguez 44' (pen.); Juan Martínez Trejo 77' | Stadium: Comandante Andrés Guacurarí; Referee: Diego Ceballos |

| 1 November 2015 Round 29 | Aldosivi | 1 – 0 | Independiente | Mar del Plata |
| 21:30 | Sand 14'; Matías Lequi (yellow card) 46'; Martínez (yellow card) 87' | Report | Victorino (yellow card) 39'; Rodríguez Berrini (yellow card) 54' | Stadium: Estadio José María Minella |

| 8 November 2015 Round 30 | Independiente | 1 – 0 | Vélez Sarsfield | Avellaneda |
| 21:30 | Benítez (yellow card) 45'; Rodriguez 90+8' (pen.) | Report | Caraglio (red card) 90+7'; Aguerre (yellow card) 90+9' | Stadium: Libertadores de América; Referee: Ariel Penel |

=== League table ===
| Pos | Team | Pld | W | D | L | GF | GA | GD | Pts | Qualification |
|---|---|---|---|---|---|---|---|---|---|---|
| 3 | Rosario Central | 30 | 16 | 11 | 3 | 47 | 26 | +21 | 59 | 2016 Copa Libertadores group stage |
| 4 | Racing | 30 | 16 | 9 | 5 | 40 | 23 | +17 | 57 | 2016 Copa Libertadores group stage |
| 5 | Independiente | 30 | 14 | 12 | 4 | 44 | 22 | +22 | 54 | 2016 Copa Sudamericana second stage |
| 6 | Belgrano | 30 | 14 | 9 | 7 | 33 | 23 | +10 | 51 | 2016 Copa Sudamericana second stage |
| 7 | Estudiantes (LP) | 30 | 14 | 9 | 7 | 34 | 28 | +6 | 51 | 2016 Copa Sudamericana second stage |

Source: AFA

=== Relegation table ===
| Pos | Team | 2012–13 Pts | 2013–14 Pts | 2014 Pts | 2015 Pts | Total Pts | Total Pld | Avg | Relegation |
|---|---|---|---|---|---|---|---|---|---|
| 1 | Independiente | - | - | 33 | 54 | 87 | 49 | 1.776 | |
| 2 | River Plate | 64 | 58 | 39 | 49 | 210 | 125 | 1.68 | |
| 3 | Boca Juniors | 51 | 61 | 31 | 64 | 207 | 125 | 1.656 | |
| 4 | San Lorenzo | 58 | 60 | 26 | 61 | 205 | 125 | 1.64 | |
| 5 | Lanús | 67 | 59 | 35 | 42 | 203 | 125 | 1.624 | |
| 6 | Newell's | 74 | 56 | 25 | 40 | 195 | 125 | 1.266 | |

=== Liguilla Pre-Libertadores ===
| 19 November 2015 Semi Final | Independiente | 4 – 1 | Belgrano | Avellaneda |
| 21:30 | Rodríguez (yellow card) 12'; Pellerano (yellow card) 17'; Vera 35', 68'; Rodríguez (yellow card) 48', (goal) 83'; Méndez (red card) 90+3'; Benítez 65' | Report | Márquez 5', (yellow card) 17'; Pérez (yellow card) 10'; Barrios (yellow card) 36' | Stadium: Libertadores de América; Referee: Silvio Trucco |

| 29 November 2015 Final | Independiente | 0 – 2 | Racing Club | Avellaneda |
| 18:15 | Rodríguez (red card) 51'; Víctor Cuesta (yellow card) 80'; Pellerano (yellow card) 85'; Lucero | Report | Bou 37'; Romero 40'; Grimi (yellow card) 56'; Díaz (yellow card) 83' | Stadium: Libertadores de América; Referee: Germán Delfino |

| 6 December 2015 Final | Racing Club | 1 – 2 (3 – 2 agg.) | Independiente | Avellaneda |
| | Sánchez (yellow card) 43'; Acuña (yellow card) 52'; Lollo 70'; Cerro (yellow card) 89' | Report | Tagliafico (yellow card) 8'; Rodríguez 66'; Gustavo Toledo (yellow card) 69'; Méndez (red card) 81'; Ortiz (red card) 84'; Lucero 90' | Stadium: Juan Domingo Perón; Referee: Patricio Loustau |

=== Results summary ===
| Overall | | | | | | | | Home | | | | | | Away | | | | | |
| Pld | W | D | L | GF | GA | GD | Pts | W | D | L | GF | GA | GD | W | D | L | GF | GA | GD |
|---|---|---|---|---|---|---|---|---|---|---|---|---|---|---|---|---|---|---|---|
| 33 | 16 | 12 | 5 | 50 | 26 | +24 | 60 | 10 | 5 | 2 | 29 | 11 | +18 | 6 | 7 | 3 | 21 | 15 | +6 |

Last updated: 2 November 2015.

=== Results by round ===
| Round | 1 | 2 | 3 | 4 | 5 | 6 | 7 | 8 | 9 | 10 | 11 | 12 | 13 | 14 | 15 | 16 | 17 | 18 | 19 | 20 | 21 | 22 | 23 | 24 | 25 | 26 | 27 | 28 | 29 | 30 | 31 | 32 | 33 |
|---|---|---|---|---|---|---|---|---|---|---|---|---|---|---|---|---|---|---|---|---|---|---|---|---|---|---|---|---|---|---|---|---|---|
| Ground | A | H | A | H | A | H | A | H | A | H | A | H | A | H | A | H | A | H | A | H | A | H | A | H | H | A | H | A | A | H | H | H | A |
| Result | W | D | W | L | D | W | D | D | L | D | D | D | L | W | D | W | W | W | W | W | D | D | D | W | W | D | W | W | L | W | W | L | W |
| Position | 7 | 9 | 10 | 12 | 9 | 6 | 7 | 8 | 11 | 12 | 12 | 14 | 17 | 14 | 16 | 13 | 12 | 9 | 7 | 7 | 7 | 7 | 6 | 6 | 4 | 6 | 5 | 5 | 5 | 5 | - | - | - |

A = Away; H = Home; W = Win; D = Draw; L = Loss

== Copa Argentina ==
=== Round of 64 ===
| 26 April 2015 Round of 64 | Independiente | 1 – 1 (4 – 1 p) | Alianza de Coronel Moldes | Córdoba |
| 21:10 | Victorino (yellow card) 45+'; Papa (yellow card) 62'; Emanuel Aguilera (yellow card) 71'; Cristian Ortíz 86' | Report | Juan Reynoso 6'; Felipe Mugnaini (yellow card) 37'; Darío Rivadero (yellow card) 53' | Stadium: Mario Alberto Kempes; Referee: Sergio Pezzotta |
| | Penalties |
| | Lucero (penalty scored); Victorino (penalty scored); Cristian Ortíz (penalty scored); Benítez (penalty scored) | | Julio Airaudo (penalty scored); Darío Rivadero (penalty missed); Jorge Zalazar (penalty missed) |

=== Round of 32 ===
| 7 August 2015 Round of 32 | Independiente | 1 – 0 | Deportivo Español | Lanús |
| 18:00 | Vera 62', (yellow card) 88'; Jesús Méndez (yellow card) 75' | Report | Francisco Gatti (yellow card) 48'; Maximiliano Sosa (yellow card) 78'; Santiago López (yellow card) 86' | Stadium: Estadio Ciudad de Lanús; Referee: Pedro Argañaraz |

=== Round of 16 ===
| 19 August 2015 Round of 16 | Independiente | 0 – 2 | Lanús | La Plata |
| 18:30 | Víctor Cuesta (yellow card) 42'; Méndez (yellow card) 45' | Report | Sergio González (yellow card) 24'; Martínez 29'; Ayala (yellow card) 34'; Castellani 52' | Stadium: Estadio Único; Referee: Diego Abal |

== Copa Sudamericana ==
=== Second stage ===
| 26 August 2015 First leg | Arsenal | 1 – 1 | Independiente | Sarandí |
| 19:00 | Federico Lértora 31', (yellow card) 88'; Iván Varga (yellow card) 76' | Report | Julián Vitale 69' | Stadium: Estadio Julio Humberto Grondona; Referee: (Brazil) Leandro Vuaden |

| 16 September 2015 Second leg | Independiente | 1 – 0 (2 – 1 agg.) | Arsenal | Avellaneda |
| 21:15 | Albertengo 86'; Rodríguez (yellow card) 90+1' | Report | Silva (yellow card) 31'; Sarulyte (yellow card) 67'; Federico Lértora (yellow card) 76'; Campos (yellow card) 81'; Fabián Muñoz (yellow card) 87' | Stadium: Libertadores de América; Referee: Andrés Cunha |

=== Round of 16 ===
| 23 September 2015 First leg | Independiente (Argentina) | 1 – 0 | (Paraguay) Club Olimpia | Avellaneda |
| 21:30 | Juan Martínez Trejo 45'; Víctor Cuesta (yellow card) 66'; Méndez (red card) 83'; Ortiz (yellow card) 85' | Report | Carlos Rolón (yellow card) 53'; Paniagua (yellow card) 86' | Stadium: Libertadores de América; Referee: (Brazil) Héber Lopes |

| 30 September 2015 Second leg | Club Olimpia (Paraguay) | 0 – 0 (0 – 1 agg.) | (Argentina) Independiente | Asunción |
| 19:30 | Torres (yellow card) 22'; Carlos Rolón (yellow card) 28'; Aranda (red card) 37'; Salgueiro (yellow card) 85' | Report | Benítez (yellow card) 28' | Stadium: Defensores del Chaco; Referee: (Uruguay) Daniel Fedorzuck |

=== Quarterfinals ===
| 21 October 2015 First leg | Independiente (Argentina) | 0 – 1 | (Colombia) Santa Fe | Avellaneda |
| 20:45 | Rodríguez (penalty missed) 31'; Pellerano (yellow card) 39' | Report | Anchico (yellow card) 39'; Leyvin Balanta 65'; Roa (yellow card) 71'; Meza (yellow card) 79' | Stadium: Libertadores de América; Referee: (Brazil) Wilton Pereira Sampaio |

| 28 October 2015 Second leg | Santa Fe (Colombia) | 1 – 1 (2 – 1 agg.) | (Argentina) Independiente | Bogotá |
| 21:00 | Meza 30'; Yeison Gordillo (yellow card) 59' | Report | Mancuello (yellow card) 26'; Rodríguez (yellow card) 59'; Pellerano (yellow card) 62'; Zapata 90+2' (o.g.) | Stadium: Nemesio Camacho; Referee: (Venezuela) José Argote |

== Statistics ==
=== Squad statistics ===
Last updated on 21 November 2015

| | | | Primera División | | | | | Copa Argentina | | | | | Copa Sudamericana | | | | | Total | | | | |
| Nation | No. | Name | | GS | Min. | Goal | Assist | | GS | Min. | Goal | Assist | | GS | Min. | Goal | Assist | | GS | Min. | Goal | Assist |
Goalkeepers
| (Argentina) | 1 | Diego Rodríguez | 31 | 31 | 2,955 | 4 | 0 | 2 | 2 | 189 | 0 | 0 | 6 | 6 | 573 | 0 | 0 | 39 | 39 | 3,717 | 4 | 0 |
| (Argentina) | 12 | Facundo Daffonchio | 0 | 0 | 0 | 0 | 0 | 0 | 0 | 0 | 0 | 0 | 0 | 0 | 0 | 0 | 0 | 0 | 0 | 0 | 0 | 0 |
| (Argentina) | 13 | Gonzalo Rehak | 0 | 0 | 0 | 0 | 0 | 0 | 0 | 0 | 0 | 0 | 0 | 0 | 0 | 0 | 0 | 0 | 0 | 0 | 0 | 0 |
| (Argentina) | 22 | Germán Montoya | 0 | 0 | 0 | 0 | 0 | 1 | 1 | 95 | 0 | 0 | 0 | 0 | 0 | 0 | 0 | 1 | 1 | 95 | 0 | 0 |
Defenders
| (Argentina) | 2 | Hernán Pellerano | 10 | 10 | 951 | 0 | 0 | 1 | 1 | 94 | 0 | 0 | 6 | 6 | 573 | 0 | 0 | 17 | 17 | 1,618 | 0 | 0 |
| (Argentina) | 3 | Lucas Villalba | 0 | 0 | 0 | 0 | 0 | 1 | 1 | 59 | 0 | 0 | 0 | 0 | 0 | 0 | 0 | 1 | 1 | 59 | 0 | 0 |
| (Argentina) | 6 | Emanuel Aguilera | 14 | 13 | 1,233 | 1 | 0 | 1 | 1 | 95 | 0 | 0 | 0 | 0 | 0 | 0 | 0 | 15 | 14 | 1,328 | 1 | 0 |
| (Argentina) | 14 | Víctor Cuesta | 28 | 28 | 2,669 | 1 | 0 | 2 | 2 | 189 | 0 | 1 | 6 | 6 | 573 | 0 | 0 | 36 | 36 | 3,431 | 1 | 1 |
| (Argentina) | 15 | Jorge Figal | 5 | 4 | 359 | 0 | 0 | 0 | 0 | 0 | 0 | 0 | 0 | 0 | 0 | 0 | 0 | 5 | 4 | 359 | 0 | 0 |
| (Argentina) | 21 | Emiliano Papa | 18 | 13 | 1,008 | 0 | 1 | 2 | 2 | 140 | 0 | 0 | 0 | 0 | 0 | 0 | 0 | 20 | 15 | 1,148 | 0 | 1 |
| (Paraguay) | 24 | Cristian Báez | 0 | 0 | 0 | 0 | 0 | 0 | 0 | 0 | 0 | 0 | 0 | 0 | 0 | 0 | 0 | 0 | 0 | 0 | 0 | 0 |
| (Argentina) | 25 | Alexis Zárate | 1 | 1 | 96 | 0 | 0 | 0 | 0 | 0 | 0 | 0 | 1 | 0 | 9 | 0 | 0 | 2 | 1 | 105 | 0 | 0 |
| (Argentina) | 26 | Gustavo Toledo | 27 | 27 | 2,573 | 0 | 1 | 2 | 2 | 189 | 0 | 0 | 6 | 6 | 573 | 0 | 0 | 35 | 35 | 3,335 | 0 | 1 |
| (Uruguay) | 30 | Mauricio Victorino | 10 | 10 | 957 | 1 | 0 | 2 | 2 | 190 | 0 | 0 | 0 | 0 | 0 | 0 | 0 | 12 | 12 | 1,147 | 1 | 0 |
| (Argentina) | 31 | Nicolás Tagliafico | 29 | 29 | 2,764 | 1 | 0 | 2 | 2 | 189 | 0 | 0 | 6 | 6 | 547 | 0 | 0 | 37 | 37 | 3,500 | 1 | 0 |
Midfielders
| (Argentina) | 4 | Jorge Ortiz | 12 | 8 | 694 | 0 | 3 | 2 | 1 | 77 | 0 | 0 | 6 | 5 | 547 | 0 | 0 | 20 | 14 | 1,235 | 0 | 3 |
| (Argentina) | 5 | Franco Bellocq | 11 | 4 | 603 | 0 | 0 | 1 | 1 | 95 | 0 | 0 | 0 | 0 | 0 | 0 | 0 | 12 | 5 | 698 | 0 | 0 |
| (Argentina) | 8 | Jesús Méndez | 22 | 21 | 1,735 | 1 | 8 | 2 | 2 | 126 | 0 | 0 | 3 | 3 | 275 | 0 | 0 | 27 | 26 | 2,136 | 1 | 8 |
| (Uruguay) | 10 | Cristian Rodríguez | 6 | 4 | 379 | 2 | 1 | 0 | 0 | 0 | 0 | 0 | 5 | 2 | 306 | 0 | 0 | 11 | 6 | 685 | 2 | 1 |
| (Argentina) | 11 | Federico Mancuello | 15 | 13 | 1,191 | 3 | 3 | 0 | 0 | 0 | 0 | 0 | 2 | 2 | 188 | 0 | 0 | 17 | 15 | 1,379 | 3 | 3 |
| (Argentina) | 16 | Cristian Ortiz | 0 | 0 | 0 | 0 | 0 | 1 | 0 | 23 | 1 | 0 | 0 | 0 | 0 | 0 | 0 | 1 | 0 | 23 | 1 | 0 |
| (Argentina) | 17 | Juan Martínez Trejo | 8 | 5 | 424 | 1 | 0 | 0 | 0 | 0 | 0 | 0 | 3 | 3 | 224 | 1 | 0 | 11 | 8 | 648 | 2 | 0 |
| (Uruguay) | 27 | Diego Rodríguez | 11 | 10 | 879 | 1 | 0 | 0 | 0 | 0 | 0 | 0 | 0 | 0 | 0 | 0 | 0 | 11 | 10 | 879 | 1 | 0 |
| (Argentina) | 32 | Matías Pisano | 26 | 22 | 1,995 | 2 | 9 | 2 | 1 | 139 | 0 | 0 | 4 | 2 | 210 | 0 | 1 | 32 | 25 | 2,344 | 2 | 10 |
| (Argentina) | 33 | Claudio Aquino | 13 | 4 | 493 | 0 | 0 | 3 | 1 | 144 | 0 | 0 | 2 | 0 | 51 | 0 | 0 | 18 | 5 | 688 | 0 | 0 |
| (Argentina) | 34 | Julian Vitale | 12 | 8 | 864 | 0 | 0 | 2 | 2 | 189 | 0 | 0 | 5 | 3 | 289 | 1 | 0 | 19 | 13 | 1,342 | 1 | 0 |
Forwards
| (Argentina) | 7 | Francisco Pizzini | 7 | 2 | 283 | 0 | 1 | 1 | 0 | 48 | 0 | 0 | 0 | 0 | 0 | 0 | 0 | 8 | 2 | 331 | 0 | 1 |
| (Uruguay) | 9 | Diego Vera | 13 | 9 | 941 | 7 | 0 | 2 | 2 | 189 | 1 | 0 | 6 | 6 | 546 | 0 | 0 | 21 | 17 | 1,676 | 8 | 0 |
| (Argentina) | 18 | Lucas Albertengo | 24 | 23 | 1,986 | 9 | 2 | 2 | 1 | 104 | 0 | 0 | 4 | 1 | 149 | 1 | 0 | 30 | 25 | 2,239 | 10 | 2 |
| (Argentina) | 19 | Juan Martín Lucero | 16 | 7 | 716 | 4 | 0 | 2 | 0 | 58 | 0 | 0 | 4 | 2 | 174 | 0 | 0 | 22 | 9 | 948 | 4 | 0 |
| (Argentina) | 28 | Jorge Pereyra Díaz | 5 | 2 | 207 | 0 | 0 | 0 | 0 | 0 | 0 | 0 | 1 | 0 | 15 | 0 | 0 | 6 | 2 | 222 | 0 | 0 |
| (Argentina) | 29 | Martín Benítez | 24 | 18 | 1,719 | 7 | 3 | 3 | 3 | 275 | 0 | 0 | 6 | 6 | 521 | 0 | 1 | 33 | 27 | 2,512 | 7 | 4 |
| (Argentina) | 36 | Ezequiel Vidal | 5 | 3 | 193 | 0 | 2 | 0 | 0 | 0 | 0 | 0 | 2 | 1 | 64 | 0 | 0 | 7 | 4 | 257 | 0 | 2 |
Players who no longer play for Independiente
| (Argentina) | 2 | Cristian Tula | 1 | 1 | 94 | 0 | 0 | 0 | 0 | 0 | 0 | 0 | 0 | 0 | 0 | 0 | 0 | 1 | 1 | 94 | 0 | 0 |
| (Argentina) | 4 | Néstor Breitenbruch | 2 | 1 | 103 | 0 | 0 | 1 | 1 | 47 | 0 | 0 | 0 | 0 | 0 | 0 | 0 | 3 | 2 | 150 | 0 | 0 |
| (Argentina) | 9 | Claudio Riaño | 8 | 6 | 665 | 2 | 1 | 0 | 0 | 0 | 0 | 0 | 0 | 0 | 0 | 0 | 0 | 8 | 6 | 665 | 2 | 1 |
| (Argentina) | 17 | Gabriel Graciani | 6 | 0 | 153 | 0 | 0 | 1 | 1 | 95 | 0 | 0 | 0 | 0 | 0 | 0 | 0 | 7 | 1 | 248 | 0 | 0 |
| (Colombia) | 20 | José Valencia | 9 | 3 | 319 | 1 | 1 | 1 | 1 | 72 | 0 | 0 | 0 | 0 | 0 | 0 | 0 | 10 | 4 | 391 | 1 | 1 |
| (Argentina) | 28 | Gabriel Vallés | 0 | 0 | 0 | 0 | 0 | 0 | 0 | 0 | 0 | 0 | 0 | 0 | 0 | 0 | 0 | 0 | 0 | 0 | 0 | 0 |

=== Goals ===
Last updated on 20 November 2015

| Rank | Player | Position | Primera División | Copa Argentina | Copa Sudamericana | Total |
|---|---|---|---|---|---|---|
| 1 | (Argentina) Lucas Albertengo | FW | 9 | 0 | 1 | 10 |
| 2 | (Uruguay) Diego Vera | FW | 7 | 1 | 0 | 8 |
| 3 | (Argentina) Martín Benítez | FW | 7 | 0 | 0 | 7 |
| 3 | (Argentina) Diego Rodríguez | GK | 4 | 0 | 0 | 4 |
| 4 | (Argentina) Juan Martín Lucero | FW | 4 | 0 | 0 | 4 |
| 5 | (Argentina) Federico Mancuello | MF | 3 | 0 | 0 | 3 |
| 6 | (Argentina) Matías Pisano | MF | 2 | 0 | 0 | 2 |
| 6 | (Argentina) Juan Martínez Trejo | MF | 1 | 0 | 1 | 2 |
| 6 | (Uruguay) Cristian Rodríguez | MF | 2 | 0 | 0 | 2 |
| 6 | (Argentina) Claudio Riaño | FW | 2 | 0 | 0 | 2 |
| 7 | (Argentina) Víctor Cuesta | DF | 1 | 0 | 0 | 1 |
| 7 | (Uruguay) Diego Rodríguez | MF | 1 | 0 | 0 | 1 |
| 7 | (Argentina) Emanuel Aguilera | DF | 1 | 0 | 0 | 1 |
| 7 | (Uruguay) Mauricio Victorino | DF | 1 | 0 | 0 | 1 |
| 7 | (Argentina) Cristian Ortiz | MF | 0 | 1 | 0 | 1 |
| 7 | (Argentina) Julián Vitale | MF | 0 | 0 | 1 | 1 |
| 7 | (Argentina) Jesús Méndez | MF | 1 | 0 | 0 | 1 |
| 7 | (Argentina) Nicolás Tagliafico | DF | 1 | 0 | 0 | 1 |
| 7 | (Colombia) José Valencia | FW | 1 | 0 | 0 | 1 |
| Own goals | | | 0 | 0 | 1 | 1 |
| Total | | | 48 | 2 | 4 | 54 |

=== Assists ===
Last updated on 20 November 2015

| Rank | Player | Position | Primera División | Copa Argentina | Copa Sudamericana | Total |
|---|---|---|---|---|---|---|
| 1 | (Argentina) Matías Pisano | MF | 9 | 0 | 1 | 10 |
| 2 | (Argentina) Jesús Méndez | MF | 8 | 0 | 0 | 8 |
| 3 | (Argentina) Martín Benítez | FW | 4 | 0 | 1 | 5 |
| 4 | (Argentina) Federico Mancuello | MF | 3 | 0 | 0 | 3 |
| 4 | (Argentina) Jorge Ortiz | MF | 3 | 0 | 0 | 3 |
| 5 | (Argentina) Lucas Albertengo | FW | 2 | 0 | 0 | 2 |
| 5 | (Argentina) Ezequiel Vidal | FW | 2 | 0 | 0 | 2 |
| 6 | (Argentina) Emiliano Papa | MF | 1 | 0 | 0 | 1 |
| 6 | (Argentina) Francisco Pizzini | FW | 1 | 0 | 0 | 1 |
| 6 | (Argentina) Víctor Cuesta | DF | 0 | 1 | 0 | 1 |
| 6 | (Argentina) Gustavo Toledo | DF | 1 | 0 | 0 | 1 |
| 6 | (Uruguay) Cristian Rodríguez | MF | 1 | 0 | 0 | 1 |
| 6 | (Argentina) Claudio Riaño | FW | 1 | 0 | 0 | 1 |
| 6 | Total | | 36 | 1 | 2 | 39 |

=== Clean sheets ===
Last updated on 9 November 2015

| Rank | Pos. | No. | Name | Primera División | Copa Argentina | Copa Sudamericana | Total |
|---|---|---|---|---|---|---|---|
| 1 | GK | 1 | (Argentina) Diego Rodríguez | 11 | 1 | 3 | 15 |
| Total | | | | 11 | 1 | 3 | 15 |

=== Disciplinary record ===
Last updated on 20 November 2015

| No. | Pos | Nat | Name | Primera División | | | Copa Argentina | | | Copa Sudamericana | | | Total | | |
| No. | Pos | Nat | Name | Yellow card | (yellow card) (yellow-red card) | Red card | Yellow card | (yellow card) (yellow-red card) | Red card | Yellow card | (yellow card) (yellow-red card) | Red card | Yellow card | (yellow card) (yellow-red card) | Red card |
Goalkeepers
| 1 | GK | (Argentina) | Diego Rodríguez | 1 | | | | | | 1 | | | 2 | | |
| 12 | GK | (Argentina) | Facundo Daffonchio | | | | | | | | | | | | |
| 13 | GK | (Argentina) | Gonzalo Rehak | | | | | | | | | | | | |
| 22 | GK | (Argentina) | Germán Montoya | | | | | | | | | | | | |
Defenders
| 2 | DF | (Argentina) | Hernán Pellerano | 4 | | | | | | 2 | | | 6 | | |
| 3 | DF | (Argentina) | Lucas Villalba | | | | | | | | | | | | |
| 6 | DF | (Argentina) | Emanuel Aguilera | 2 | | | 1 | | | | | | 3 | | |
| 14 | DF | (Argentina) | Víctor Cuesta | 9 | | | 1 | | | 1 | | | 11 | | |
| 15 | DF | (Argentina) | Jorge Figal | 1 | | | | | | | | | 1 | | |
| 21 | DF | (Argentina) | Emiliano Papa | 2 | | | 1 | | | | | | 3 | | |
| 24 | DF | (Paraguay) | Cristian Báez | | | | | | | | | | | | |
| 25 | DF | (Argentina) | Alexis Zárate | | | | | | | | | | | | |
| 26 | DF | (Argentina) | Gustavo Toledo | 5 | | | | | | | | | 5 | | |
| 30 | DF | (Uruguay) | Mauricio Victorino | 5 | | | | | | 1 | | | 6 | | |
| 31 | DF | (Argentina) | Nicolás Tagliafico | 3 | | | | | | | | | 3 | | |
Midfielders
| 4 | MF | (Argentina) | Jorge Ortiz | 2 | | | | | | 1 | | | 3 | | |
| 5 | MF | (Argentina) | Franco Bellocq | 2 | | | | | | | | | 2 | | |
| 8 | MF | (Argentina) | Jesús Méndez | 13 | 12 | | 2 | | | | | 1 | 15 | 2 | 1 |
| 10 | MF | (Uruguay) | Cristian Rodríguez | 1 | | | | | | 1 | | | 2 | | |
| 11 | MF | (Argentina) | Federico Mancuello | 3 | 1 | 1 | | | | 1 | | | 4 | 1 | 1 |
| 16 | MF | (Argentina) | Cristian Ortiz | | | | | | | | | | | | |
| 17 | MF | (Argentina) | Juan Martínez Trejo | 1 | | | | | | | | | 1 | | |
| 27 | MF | (Uruguay) | Diego Rodríguez | 5 | | 1 | | | | | | | 5 | | 1 |
| 32 | MF | (Argentina) | Matías Pisano | 3 | | | | | | | | | 3 | | |
| 33 | MF | (Argentina) | Claudio Aquino | 1 | | | | | | | | | 1 | | |
| 34 | MF | (Argentina) | Julian Vitale | 2 | | | | | | | | | 2 | | |
Forwards
| 7 | FW | (Argentina) | Francisco Pizzini | | | | | | | | | | | | |
| 9 | FW | (Uruguay) | Diego Vera | 2 | | | 1 | | | | | | 3 | | |
| 18 | FW | (Argentina) | Lucas Albertengo | 2 | | | | | | | | | 2 | | |
| 19 | FW | (Argentina) | Juan Martín Lucero | 2 | | | | | | | | | 2 | | |
| 28 | FW | (Argentina) | Jorge Pereyra Díaz | | | | | | | | | | | | |
| 29 | FW | (Argentina) | Martín Benítez | 4 | | | 1 | | | | | | 5 | | |
| 36 | FW | (Argentina) | Ezequiel Vidal | | | | | | | | | | | | |
Players transferred out during the season
| 2 | DF | (Argentina) | Cristian Tula | | | | | | | | | | | | |
| 4 | DF | (Argentina) | Néstor Breitenbruch | | | | | | | | | | | | |
| 9 | FW | (Argentina) | Claudio Riaño | | | | | | | | | | | | |
| 17 | MF | (Argentina) | Gabriel Graciani | 1 | | | | | | | | | 1 | | |
| 20 | FW | (Colombia) | José Valencia | | | | | | | | | | | | |
| 28 | DF | (Argentina) | Gabriel Vallés | | | | | | | | | | | | |
| Total | | | | 75 | 3 | 2 | 7 | | | 8 | | 1 | 90 | 3 | '3 |

=== Penalties ===
Last updated on 9 November 2015 2015

| Date | Penalty Taker | Scored | Opponent | Competition |
|---|---|---|---|---|
| 14 February 2015 | Diego Rodríguez | Yes | Newell's Old Boys | Primera División |
| 4 October 2015 | Diego Rodríguez | Yes | River Plate | Primera División |
| 16 October 2015 | Diego Rodríguez | Yes | Crucero del Norte | Primera División |
| 22 October 2015 | Diego Rodríguez | No | Santa Fe | Copa Sudamericana |
| 8 November 2015 | Diego Rodríguez | Yes | Vélez Sarsfield | Primera División |

=== Overall ===
Last updated on 20 November 2015

| | Total | Home | Away | Naturel |
|---|---|---|---|---|
| Games played | 41 | 20 | 18 | 3 |
| Games won | 17 | 11 | 6 | 1 |
| Games drawn | 16 | 5 | 10 | 1 |
| Games lost | 7 | 3 | 3 | 1 |
| Biggest win | 4-0 vs Arsenal; 4-0 vs Crucero del Norte | 4-0 vs Arsenal | 4-0 vs Crucero del Norte | 1-0 vs Deportivo Español |
| Biggest loss | 1-2 vs Belgrano; 0-1 vs San Lorenzo; 0-1 vs Racing Club; 0-1 vs Santa Fe; 0-1 vs Aldosivi | 0-2 vs Racing Club | 0-1 vs San Lorenzo; 0-1 vs Racing Club; 0-1 vs Aldosivi | 0-2 vs Lanús |
| Biggest win (League) | 4-0 vs Arsenal; 4-0 vs Crucero del Norte | 4-0 vs Arsenal | 4-0 vs Crucero del Norte | N/A |
| Biggest win (Copa Argentina) | 1-0 vs Deportivo Español | N/A | N/A | 1-0 vs Deportivo Español |
| Biggest win (Copa Sudamericana) | 1-0 vs Arsenal; 1-0 vs Olimpia | 1-0 vs Arsenal; 1-0 vs Olimpia | - | N/A |
| Biggest loss (League) | 1-2 vs Club Atlético Belgrano; 0-1 vs San Lorenzo; 0-1 vs Racing Club; 0-1 vs Aldosivi | 0-2 vs Racing Club | 0-1 vs San Lorenzo; 0-1 vs Racing Club; 0-1 vs Aldosivi | N/A |
| Biggest loss (Copa Argentina) | 0-2 vs Lanús | N/A | N/A | 0-2 vs Lanús |
| Biggest loss (Copa Sudamericana) | 0-1 vs Santa Fe | 0-1 vs Santa Fe | - | N/A |
| Clean sheets | 15 | 10 | 4 | 1 |
| Goals scored | 54 | 26 | 28 | 2 |
| Goals conceded | 31 | 12 | 16 | 3 |
| Goal difference | +23 | +14 | +12 | -1 |
| Average GF per game | 1.32 | 1.3 | 1.56 | 0.67 |
| Average GA per game | 0.76 | 0.6 | 0.89 | 1 |
| Yellow cards | 90 | 37 | 46 | 7 |
| Red cards | 6 | 5 | 1 | - |
| Most appearances | | – | | |
| Most minutes played | | – | | |
| Most goals | (Argentina) Lucas Albertengo (10) | – | | |
| Worst discipline | Jesús Méndez (3RC); Jesús Méndez (14YC) | Jesús Méndez (2RC); Jesús Méndez (7YC) | Federico Mancuello (1RC); Jesús Méndez (6YC) | Jesús Méndez (2YC) |
| Penalties for | 5 | 3 | 2 | - |
| Penalties against | 8 | 3 | 5 | - |
