= 2016 Club Atlético Independiente season =

Independiente
2016 season
- President: Hugo Moyano
- Manager: (Argentina) Gabriel Milito
- Stadium: Libertadores de América
- Primera División: 3rd
- Copa Argentina: Round of 32
- Top goalscorer: League: Fernández; Germán Denis; and Emiliano Rigoni (3); All: Fernández (4)

The 2016 season Independiente Participate in the Primera División and the Copa Argentina.

== Club ==
=== Kits ===
- Supplier: Puma SE
- Main Sponsor:: (Argentina) Correo OCA / (Argentina)
- Secondary Sponsor: (Argentina) Audifarm Salud

Home Kit	Away Kit	3rd Kit	GK kit

=== Squad information ===
N	Pos.	Nat.	Name	Age	EU	Since	App	Goals	Ends	Transfer fee	Notes
1	GK	(Argentina)	Diego Matías Rodríguez	37	EU	2011	135	9	2017	Youth system	Second nationality: Italy
2	CB	(Argentina)	Hernán Pellerano	32	EU	2015	34	0	2018	9,000,000 $	Second nationality: Italy
3	LB	(Argentina)	Nicolás Tagliafico	34	EU	2015	56	2	2018	1,200,000 $	Second nationality: Italy
4	DM	(Argentina)	Jorge Ortiz	42	Non-EU	2015	32	1	2018	11,750,000 $	
5	DM	(Argentina)	Julián Vitale	31	Non-EU	2015	20	1	N/A	Youth system	
6	CB	(Argentina)	Emanuel Aguilera	33	Non-EU	2014	24	1	2017	260,000 $	
7	LW	(Argentina)	Martín Benítez	32	Non-EU	2011	89	12	2017	Youth system	
8	CM	(Argentina)	Jesús Méndez	42	Non-EU	2014	51	2	2015	450,000 $	
9	CF	(Uruguay)	Diego Vera	32	Non-EU	2015	35	11	2018	15,000,000 $	
10	RW	(Uruguay)	Cristian Rodríguez	31	EU	2015	22	3	2017	1,000,000 $	Second nationality: Italy
11	CF	(Argentina)	Leandro Fernández	35	Non-EU	2016	12	4	N/A	N/A	
12	GK	(Argentina)	Facundo Daffonchio	36	Non-EU	2011	0	0	2016	Youth system	
13	GK	(Argentina)	Gonzalo Rehak	33	Non-EU	2014	0	0	N/A	Youth system	
14	CB	(Argentina)	Víctor Cuesta	37	Non-EU	2014	71	5	2017	160,000 $	
15	DM	(Uruguay)	Diego Martín Rodríguez	37	EU	2015	25	1	2018	1,200,000 $	Second nationality: Italy
17	LM	(Argentina)	Juan Martínez Trejo	32	Non-EU	2012	24	2	2017	Youth system	
18	CF	(Argentina)	Lucas Albertengo	35	Non-EU	2015	30	10	2018	2,200,000 €	
19	CF	(Argentina)	Germán Denis	45	EU	2007	85	40	2019	Free	Second nationality: Italy
20	LW	(Argentina)	Ezequiel Vidal	31	Non-EU	2015	8	0	N/A	Youth system	
22	AM	(Argentina)	Claudio Aquino	35	Non-EU	2015	32	1	2018	1,150,000 $	
24	RM	(Argentina)	Emiliano Rigoni	33	Non-EU	2016	17	4	2019	15,000,000 $	
25	GK	(Uruguay)	Martín Campaña	37	Non-EU	2016	12	0	2018	1,150,000 $	
26	RB	(Argentina)	Gustavo Toledo	37	Non-EU	2015	52	0	2018	8800,000 $	
27	RW	(Argentina)	Rodrigo Gómez	33	Non-EU	2015	15	1	N/A	27,500 $	
28	CF	(Argentina)	Gastón Del Castillo	29	Non-EU	2016	2	0	N/A	Youth system	
29	DM	(Argentina)	Saúl Nelle	31	Non-EU	2016	2	0	N/A	Youth system	
30	RB	(Argentina)	Rodrigo Moreira	30	Non-EU	2015	0	0	N/A	Youth system	
31	CF	(Argentina)	Domingo Blanco	31	Non-EU	2016	2	0	N/A	Youth system	
32	RB	(Argentina)	Néstor Breitenbruch	31	Non-EU	2014	15	0	2019	Youth system	
34	CB	(Argentina)	Rafael Barrios	33	Non-EU	2014	6	0	N/A	Youth system	

- Last updated: 31 May 2016
- Source: Clubaindependiente.com, Futbolpasion.com, Copa Argentina
- Ordered by squad number.

=== Current coaching staff ===
Position	Staff
Coach	(Argentina) Gabriel Milito
Assistant Coach	(Argentina) Carlos Compagnucci
Assistant Coach	(Spain) Xavi Tamarit
Fitness Coach	(Argentina) Gabriel Macaya
Goalkeepers coach	(Argentina) Pablo Cavallero
Reserve team Coach	(Argentina) Fernando Berón
Youth Department	(Argentina) Jorge Griffa
Doctor	(Argentina) Dr Luis Chiaradia
Doctor	(Argentina) Dr Sergio Mauro
Kinesiology	(Argentina) Gabriel De Brasi
Kinesiology	(Argentina) Julio Zunino
Massageist	(Argentina) Christian Trobec
Props	(Argentina) Daniel Sotelo
Props	(Argentina) Mariano Bagtano

Source: clubaindependiente.com

== Transfers ==
=== Player In ===
No	Name	Nation	Pos	Moving From	Type	Fee (in $)
Summer
25	Martín Campaña	(Uruguay)	Goalkeeper	(Uruguay) Defensor Sporting	Loan In	150,000 $
27	Rodrigo Gómez	(Argentina)	Midfielder	(Argentina) Quilmes	Loan Return	Free
24	Néstor Breitenbruch	(Argentina)	Defender	(Argentina) Quilmes	Loan Return	Free
24	Emiliano Rigoni	(Argentina)	Midfielder	(Argentina) Belgrano	Transfer	15,000,000 $
11	Leandro Fernández	(Argentina)	Forward	(Argentina) Godoy Cruz	Transfer (50%)	170,000 $
19	Germán Denis	(Argentina)	Forward	(Italy) Atalanta	Free transfer	Free

Total spending: ▼15,320,000 $

=== Player Out ===
No	Name	Nation	Pos	Moving to	Type	Fee (in $)
Summer
22	Germán Montoya	(Argentina)	Goalkeeper	(Argentina) Atlético Rafaela	End of contract	Free
15	Jorge Figal	(Argentina)	Defender	(Argentina) Olimpo	Loan Out	Free
24	Cristian Báez	(Paraguay)	Defender	(Peru) Universidad de San Martín	End of contract	Free
3	Lucas Villalba	(Argentina)	Defender	(Argentina) Atlético Tucumán	Loan Out	Free
30	Mauricio Victorino	(Uruguay)	Defender	(Uruguay) Nacional	End of contract	Free
25	Alexis Zárate	(Argentina)	Defender	(Argentina) Temperley	Loan Out	Free
16	Christian Ortiz	(Argentina)	Midfielder	(Peru) Universidad de San Martín	Loan Out	Free
11	Federico Mancuello	(Argentina)	Midfielder	(Brazil) Flamengo	Transfer	3,000,000 $
32	Matías Pisano	(Argentina)	Midfielder	(Brazil) Cruzeiro	Transfer (50%)	1,000,000 $
5	Franco Bellocq	(Argentina)	Defender	(Argentina) Arsenal	Loan Out	Free
7	Francisco Pizzini	(Argentina)	Forward	(Argentina) Olimpo	Loan Out	Free
28	Jorge Pereyra Díaz	(Argentina)	Forward	(Malaysia) Johor	End of Loan	Free
21	Emiliano Papa	(Argentina)	Defender	(Argentina) Club Atlético Tigre	End of contract	Free
19	Juan Martín Lucero	(Argentina)	Forward	(Malaysia) Johor	Transfer	1,400,000 $

Total Income ▲: 5,400,000 $

=== Players out on loan ===
No	Name	Nation	Pos	Destination	Finish at
Summer
15	Jorge Figal	(Argentina)	Defender	(Argentina) Olimpo	30-06-2017
3	Lucas Villalba	(Argentina)	Defender	(Argentina) Atlético Tucumán	30-06-2017
25	Alexis Zárate	(Argentina)	Defender	(Argentina) Temperley	30-06-2017
16	Christian Ortiz	(Argentina)	Midfielder	(Peru) Universidad de San Martín	31-01-2017
5	Franco Bellocq	(Argentina)	Defender	(Argentina) Arsenal	30-06-2017
7	Francisco Pizzini	(Argentina)	Forward	(Argentina) Olimpo	30-06-2017
-	Jorge Márquez	(Argentina)	Forward	(Argentina) Quilmes	30-06-2017
-	Gabriel Arce	(Argentina)	Forward	(Argentina) Gimnasia (J)	30-06-2017
Previous seasons
6	Sergio Ojeda	(Argentina)	Defender	(Argentina) Gimnasia (J)	30-06-2017

Net income: ▲9,920,000 $

== Pre-season ==
Win Draw Loss Postponed

=== Copa De Oro ===
12 January 2016 Copa De Oro	Independiente	1 – 1	San Lorenzo	Mar del Plata
22:10	Víctor Cuesta 85'	Report	Blandi 65'; Mussis (yellow card) 82'; Kalinski (yellow card) 84'; Lautaro Montoya (yellow card) 88'	Stadium: Estadio José María Minella; Referee: Diego Abal

18 January 2016 Copa De Oro	Independiente	3 – 2	River Plate	Mar del Plata
22:10	Aquino 31', 67'; Víctor Cuesta 81'	Report	Driussi 21'; Pisculichi 90'	Stadium: Estadio José María Minella; Referee: Fernando Rapallini

Standings
Pos	Team	Pld	W	D	L	GF	GA	GD	Pts
1	Independiente	2	1	1	0	4	3	+1	4
2	River Plate	2	1	0	1	5	5	0	3
3	San Lorenzo	2	0	1	1	3	4	−1	1

=== Copa De Avellaneda ===
29 January 2016 Copa De Avellaneda	Independiente	1 – 3	Racing Club	Mar del Plata
22:10	Diego Martín Rodríguez (red card) 22'; Lucero 67'	Report	Noir 44'; L.Martínez; R.Martínez	Stadium: Estadio José María Minella

=== Friendly ===
==== Winter ====
Win Draw Loss Postponed

== Competitions ==
=== Overall ===
Competition	Started round	Current position / round	Final position / round	First match	Last match
Primera División	-	-	3rd	7 February 2016	21 May 2016
Copa Argentina	Round of 64	Round of 32	N/A	4 May 2016	N/A

=== Overview ===
Updated as of 31 May 2016

Competition	Record							
Competition	G	W	D	L	GF	GA	GD	Win %
Primera División	16	7	6	3	22	12	+10	43.75
Copa Argentina	1	1	0	0	2	1	+1	100.00
Total	17	8	6	3	24	13	+11	47.06

== Primera División ==
Win Draw Loss Postponed

7 February 2016 Round 1	Independiente	1 – 0	Belgrano	Avellaneda
17:00	Rigoni (yellow card) 43', (goal) 86'	Report	Federico Álvarez (yellow card) 70'; Olave (yellow card) 72'; Saravia (yellow card) 79'; Farré (yellow card) 80'	Stadium: Libertadores de América; Referee: Darío Herrera

14 February 2016 Round 2	Godoy Cruz	1 – 1	Independiente	Mendoza
21:15	García 16', (yellow card) 44'; Godoy (yellow card) 52'; G.Fernández (yellow card) 59'; Ortiz (yellow card) 67'; Fernando Zuqui (yellow card) 84'	Report	Denis 4'; Fernández (red card) 79'	Stadium: Malvinas Argentinas; Referee: Fernando Rapallini

17 February 2016 Round 3	Independiente	0 – 2	Rosario Central	Avellaneda
19:10	Ortiz (yellow card) 48'; Gustavo Toledo (yellow card) 49'; Víctor Cuesta (yellow card) 54'; Denis (yellow card) 85'	Report	Damián Musto (yellow card) 48'; Larrondo 50' (pen.); Jonás Aguirre 64'; Álvarez (yellow card) 86'	Stadium: Libertadores de América; Referee: Jorge Baliño

21 February 2016 Round 4	Independiente	1 – 1	Racing Club	Avellaneda
21 February 2016	Ortiz (yellow card) 24'; Fernández 86'	Report	Grimi (yellow card) 9'; Díaz (yellow card) 17'; López 89'	Stadium: Libertadores de América; Referee: Diego Abal

29 February 2016 Round 5	River Plate	1 – 0	Independiente	Buenos Aires
21:15	Arzura (yellow card) 43'; Mercado (yellow card) 50'; Alario 83'	Report	Diego Martín Rodríguez (yellow card) 61'	Stadium: Monumental; Referee: Néstor Pitana

6 March 2016 Round 6	Independiente	4 – 1	Colón	Avellaneda
20:15	Denis 11'; Benegas 22' (o.g.); Víctor Cuesta (yellow card) 55', (goal) 85'; Benítez (yellow card) 73'; Rigoni 89'	Report	Figueroa 23'; Ruiz (yellow card) 49'	Stadium: Libertadores de América; Referee: Fernando Echenique

13 March 2016 Round 7	Banfield	1 – 3	Independiente	Banfield
17:45	Simeone 13'; Soto (yellow card) 50'; Iván Rossi (yellow card) 54'	Report	Tagliafico 34'; Víctor Cuesta (yellow card) 36'; Vera 38'; Gustavo Toledo (yellow card) 51'; Benítez 63'	Stadium: Florencio Solá; Referee: Silvio Trucco

20 March 2016 Round 8	Independiente	2 – 1	Patronato	Avellaneda
20:00	Denis 45' (pen.); Víctor Cuesta (yellow card) 58', (goal) 77'; Benítez (yellow card) 68'; Pellerano (yellow card) 90+1'	Report	Wálter Andrade (red card) 45'; Carrasco 34'; Marcelo Guzmán (yellow card) 37'	Stadium: Libertadores de América; Referee: Patricio Loustau

3 April 2016 Round 9	Sarmiento	0 – 0	Independiente	Junín
20:00	Guillermo Ferracuti (yellow card) 68'	Report	Víctor Cuesta (yellow card) 51'	Stadium: Eva Perón; Referee: Diego Abal

9 April 2016 Round 10	Independiente	0 – 0	Olimpo	Avellaneda
20:00	Fernández (yellow card) 59'; Tagliafico (yellow card) 79'; C.Rodríguez (yellow card) 79'	Report	Jorge Figal (yellow card) 42'; Oiraghi (yellow card) 63'; Míguez (yellow card) 86'; Sills (yellow card) 87'	Stadium: Libertadores de América; Referee: Fernando Echenique

17 April 2016 Round 11	Vélez Sarsfield	0 – 2	Independiente	Buenos Aires
17:45	Desábato (yellow card) 80'	Report	Ortiz 9'; Víctor Cuesta (yellow card) 28'; Jesús Méndez (yellow card) 38'; Rigoni 49'; Fernández (yellow card) 65'	Stadium: José Amalfitani; Referee: Mariano González

24 April 2016 Round 12	Racing Club	0 – 0	Independiente	Avellaneda
18:45	Díaz (yellow card) 90+2'	Report	Vera (yellow card) 54'; Tagliafico (yellow card) 65'; Pellerano (yellow card) 82'	Stadium: Juan Domingo Perón; Referee: Federico Beligoy

30 April 2016 Round 13	Independiente	0 – 1	San Lorenzo	Avellaneda
14:00		Report	Blandi (yellow card) 33', (goal) 47'; Buffarini (yellow card) 75'	Stadium: Libertadores de América; Referee: Patricio Loustau

8 May 2016 Round 14	Gimnasia (LP)	3 – 3	Independiente	La Plata
20:45	Maximiliano Meza 4', 42'; O.Benítez (yellow card) 61'; Facundo Oreja 84'	Report	Méndez (yellow card) 12'; Rigoni (yellow card) 35'; M.Benítez 49'; Vera 54'; Fernández 90+1'	Stadium: El Bosque; Referee: Juan Pablo Pompei

15 May 2016 Round 15	Independiente	2 – 0	Arsenal	Avellaneda
20:00	Fernández 55', (yellow card) 56'; Rodrigo Gómez 86'	Report	Claudio Corvalán (yellow card) 33'; Bazán (yellow card) 35'; Carrera (red card) 54'; Franco Bellocq (yellow card) 89'	Stadium: Libertadores de América; Referee: Germán Delfino

22 May 2016 Round 16	Quilmes	0 -3	Independiente	Quilmes
	Malrechauffe (yellow card) 4'; Lucas Pérez Godoy (yellow card) 39'	Report	Rigoni 7'; Vera 11'; Víctor Cuesta 42'	Stadium: Centenario Dr. José Luis Meiszner; Referee: Héctor Paletta

=== League table ===
Zone 1
Pos	Team	Pld	W	D	L	GF	GA	GD	Pts	Qualification
1	San Lorenzo	16	10	4	2	23	16	+7	34	Championship playoff 2017 Copa Libertadores group stage
2	Godoy Cruz	16	10	3	3	27	14	+13	33	2017 Copa Libertadores group stage
3	Independiente	16	7	6	3	22	12	+10	27	2017 Copa Sudamericana first stage
4	Arsenal	16	8	3	5	21	15	+6	27	2017 Copa Sudamericana first stage
5	Gimnasia y Esgrima (LP)	16	7	4	5	19	19	0	25	2017 Copa Sudamericana first stage

Source: AFA

=== Relegation ===
Pos	Team	2013–14 Pts	2014 Pts	2015 Pts	2016 Pts	Total Pts	Total Pld	Avg	Relegation
1	Atlético Tucumán	—	—	—	30	30	16	1.875	
2	San Lorenzo	60	26	61	34	181	103	1.757	
3	Independiente	—	33	54	27	114	65	1.754	
4	Boca Juniors	61	31	64	20	176	103	1.709	
5	Lanús	59	35	42	38	174	103	1.689	

=== Results summary ===
Overall								Home						Away					
Pld	W	D	L	GF	GA	GD	Pts	W	D	L	GF	GA	GD	W	D	L	GF	GA	GD
16	7	6	3	22	12	+10	27	4	2	2	10	6	+4	3	4	1	12	6	+6

Last updated: 31 May 2016.

=== Results by round ===
Round	1	2	3	4	5	6	7	8	9	10	11	12	13	14	15	16
Ground	H	A	H	H	A	H	A	H	A	H	A	A	H	A	H	A
Result	W	D	L	D	L	W	W	W	D	D	W	D	L	D	W	W
Position	4	5	9	9	11	9	6	3	5	5	4	4	5	6	3	3

A = Away; H = Home; W = Win; D = Draw; L = Loss

== Copa Argentina ==
=== Round of 64 ===
4 May 2016 Round of 64	Independiente	2 – 1	San Telmo	Formosa
22:00	Víctor Cuesta (yellow card) 22'; Fernández 36'; Aquino 48'	Report	Leandro Wagner (yellow card) 45'; Nahuel Oviedo 49'; Guillermo Esteban (yellow card) 62'; Cristian Leiva (yellow card) 67'; Matías Correa (yellow card) 73'	Stadium: Estadio Antonio Romero; Referee: Pedro Argañaraz

=== Round of 32 ===
Round of 32	Independiente	v

== Statistics ==
=== Squad statistics ===
Last updated on 24 March 2016

			Primera División					Copa Argentina					Total				
Nation	No.	Name		GS	Min.	Goal	Assist		GS	Min.	Goal	Assist		GS	Min.	Goal	Assist
Goalkeepers
(Argentina)	1	Diego Matías Rodríguez	0	0	0	0	0	0	0	0	0	0	0	0	0	0	0
(Argentina)	12	Facundo Daffonchio	0	0	0	0	0	0	0	0	0	0	0	0	0	0	0
(Argentina)	13	Gonzalo Rehak	0	0	0	0	0	0	0	0	0	0	0	0	0	0	0
(Uruguay)	25	Martín Campaña	0	0	0	0	0	0	0	0	0	0	0	0	0	0	0
Defenders
(Argentina)	2	Hernán Pellerano	0	0	0	0	0	0	0	0	0	0	0	0	0	0	0
(Argentina)	3	Nicolás Tagliafico	0	0	0	0	0	0	0	0	0	0	0	0	0	0	0
(Argentina)	6	Emanuel Aguilera	0	0	0	0	0	0	0	0	0	0	0	0	0	0	0
(Argentina)	14	Víctor Cuesta	0	0	0	0	0	0	0	0	0	0	0	0	0	0	0
(Argentina)	26	Gustavo Toledo	0	0	0	0	0	0	0	0	0	0	0	0	0	0	0
(Argentina)	30	Rodrigo Moreira	0	0	0	0	0	0	0	0	0	0	0	0	0	0	0
(Argentina)	32	Néstor Breitenbruch	0	0	0	0	0	0	0	0	0	0	0	0	0	0	0
(Argentina)	34	Rafael Barrios	0	0	0	0	0	0	0	0	0	0	0	0	0	0	0
Midfielders
(Argentina)	4	Jorge Ortiz	0	0	0	0	0	0	0	0	0	0	0	0	0	0	0
(Argentina)	5	Julián Vitale	0	0	0	0	0	0	0	0	0	0	0	0	0	0	0
(Argentina)	8	Jesús Méndez	0	0	0	0	0	0	0	0	0	0	0	0	0	0	0
(Uruguay)	10	Cristian Rodríguez	0	0	0	0	0	0	0	0	0	0	0	0	0	0	0
(Uruguay)	15	Diego Martín Rodríguez	0	0	0	0	0	0	0	0	0	0	0	0	0	0	0
(Argentina)	17	Juan Martínez Trejo	0	0	0	0	0	0	0	0	0	0	0	0	0	0	0
(Uruguay)	22	Claudio Aquino	0	0	0	0	0	0	0	0	0	0	0	0	0	0	0
(Argentina)	24	Emiliano Rigoni	0	0	0	0	0	0	0	0	0	0	0	0	0	0	0
(Argentina)	27	Rodrigo Gómez	0	0	0	0	0	0	0	0	0	0	0	0	0	0	0
(Argentina)	29	Saúl Nelle	0	0	0	0	0	0	0	0	0	0	0	0	0	0	0
Forwards
(Argentina)	7	Martín Benítez	0	0	0	0	0	0	0	0	0	0	0	0	0	0	0
(Uruguay)	9	Diego Vera	0	0	0	0	0	0	0	0	0	0	0	0	0	0	0
(Argentina)	11	Leandro Fernández	0	0	0	0	0	0	0	0	0	0	0	0	0	0	0
(Argentina)	18	Lucas Albertengo	0	0	0	0	0	0	0	0	0	0	0	0	0	0	0
(Argentina)	19	Germán Denis	0	0	0	0	0	0	0	0	0	0	0	0	0	0	0
(Argentina)	20	Ezequiel Vidal	0	0	0	0	0	0	0	0	0	0	0	0	0	0	0
(Argentina)	28	Gastón Del Castillo	0	0	0	0	0	0	0	0	0	0	0	0	0	0	0
(Argentina)	31	Domingo Blanco	0	0	0	0	0	0	0	0	0	0	0	0	0	0	0
Players who no longer play for Independiente
(Argentina)	19	Juan Martín Lucero	0	0	0	0	0	0	0	0	0	0	0	0	0	0	0

=== Goals ===
Last updated on 20 May 2016

Rank	Player	Position	Primera División	Copa Argentina	Total
1	(Argentina) Leandro Fernández	FW	3	1	4
2	(Argentina) Germán Denis	FW	3	0	3
2	(Argentina) Emiliano Rigoni	MF	3	0	3
3	(Argentina) Víctor Cuesta	DF	2	0	2
3	(Argentina) Martín Benítez	FW	2	0	2
3	(Uruguay) Diego Vera	FW	2	0	2
4	(Argentina) Nicolás Tagliafico	DF	1	0	1
4	(Argentina) Jorge Ortiz	MF	1	0	1
4	(Argentina) Claudio Aquino	MF	0	1	1
4	(Argentina) Rodrigo Gómez	MF	0	1	1
Own goals			1	0	1
Total			19	2	21

=== Assists ===
Last updated on 20 May 2016

Rank	Player	Position	Primera División	Copa Argentina	Total
1	(Argentina) Emiliano Rigoni	MF	4	0	4
2	(Argentina) Leandro Fernández	FW	2	1	3
3	(Argentina) Gustavo Toledo	DF	2	0	2
3	(Argentina) Claudio Aquino	MF	2	0	2
3	(Uruguay) Diego Vera	FW	2	0	2
4	(Argentina) Rodrigo Gómez	MF	1	0	1
4	(Argentina) Martín Benítez	FW	1	0	1
4	(Argentina) Germán Denis	FW	1	0	1
4	(Argentina) Nicolás Tagliafico	DF	0	1	1
4	(Argentina) Jesús Méndez	MF	1	0	1
Total			16	2	18

=== Clean sheets ===
Last updated on 20 May 2016

Rank	Player	Position	Primera División	Copa Argentina	Total
1	(Uruguay) Martín Campaña	GK	5	0	5
2	(Argentina) Diego Rodríguez	GK	1	0	1
Total			6	0	6

=== Disciplinary record ===
Last updated on 11 May 2016

No.	Pos	Nat	Name	Primera División			Copa Argentina			Total			Suspended
No.	Pos	Nat	Name	Yellow card	(yellow card) (yellow-red card)	Red card	Yellow card	(yellow card) (yellow-red card)	Red card	Yellow card	(yellow card) (yellow-red card)	Red card	
14	DF	(Argentina)	Víctor Cuesta	6			1			7			
11	FW	(Argentina)	Leandro Fernández	4	1					4	1		
2	DF	(Argentina)	Hernán Pellerano	3						3			
3	DF	(Argentina)	Nicolás Tagliafico	2						2			
26	GK	(Argentina)	Gustavo Toledo	2						2			
4	MF	(Argentina)	Jorge Ortiz	2						2			
7	FW	(Argentina)	Martín Benítez	2						2			
8	MF	(Argentina)	Jesús Méndez	2						2			
24	MF	(Argentina)	Emiliano Rigoni	2						2			
10	MF	(Uruguay)	Cristian Rodríguez	1						1			
15	MF	(Uruguay)	Diego Martín Rodríguez	1						1			
9	FW	(Uruguay)	Diego Vera	1						1			
19	FW	(Argentina)	Germán Denis	1						1			

=== Penalties ===
Last updated on 24 March 2016

Date	Penalty Taker	Scored	Opponent	Competition
19 March 2016	Germán Denis	Yes	Patronato	Primera División

=== Overall ===
Last updated on 20 May 2016

	Total	Home	Away	Naturel
Games played	16	8	7	1
Games won	7	4	2	1
Games drawn	6	2	4	-
Games lost	3	2	1	-
Biggest win	4 – 1 vs Colón	4 – 1 vs Colón	3 – 1 vs Banfield	2-1 vs San Telmo
Biggest loss	0 – 2 vs Rosario Central	0 – 2 vs Rosario Central	0 – 1 vs River Plate	-
Biggest win (League)	4 – 1 vs Colón	4 – 1 vs Colón	3 – 1 vs Banfield	N/A
Biggest win (Copa Argentina)	2-1 vs San Telmo	N/A	N/A	2-1 vs San Telmo
Biggest loss (League)	0-2 vs Rosario Central	0-2 vs Rosario Central	0 – 1 vs River Plate	N/A
Biggest loss (Copa Argentina)	–	N/A	N/A	-
Clean sheets	6	3	3	-
Goals scored	21	10	9	2
Goals conceded	13	5	7	1
Goal difference	8	5	2	1
Average GF per game	1.31	1.25	1.29	2
Average GA per game	0.81	0.75	0.86	1
Yellow cards	29	14	14	1
Red cards	1	0	1	-
Most appearances	-	–		
Most minutes played	-	–		
Most goals	-	–		
Penalties for	1	1	-	-
Penalties against	1	1	-	-
