= 2016–17 Club Atlético Independiente season =

Independiente
2016–17 season
- President: Hugo Moyano
- Manager: (Argentina) Gabriel Milito
- Stadium: Libertadores de América
- Primera División: Preseason
- Copa Sudamericana: Round of 32

The 2016–17 season Independiente participated in the Primera División, Copa Sudamericana and continued in Copa Argentina from the previous season.

== Club ==
=== Kits ===
- Supplier: Puma SE
- Main Sponsor:: (Argentina) Correo OCA / (Argentina)
- Secondary Sponsor: (Argentina) Audifarm Salud

Home Kit	Away Kit	Alternate Kit	GK kit

== Current squad ==
Last updated on May 22, 2016

Squad No.	Name	Nationality	Position	Date of Birth (Age)	Apps	Goals	Signed from	Note
Goalkeepers
13	Gonzalo Rehak	(Argentina)	GK	January 11, 1994 (age 32)	0	0	(Argentina) Academy	
25	Martín Campaña	(Uruguay)	GK	May 29, 1989 (age 37)	18	0	(Uruguay) Defensor Sporting	
	Damián Albil	(Argentina)	GK	February 9, 1979 (age 47)	19	0	(Argentina) Academy	
Defenders
2	Hernán Pellerano (VC)	(Argentina)	DF	June 4, 1984 (age 42)	35	0	(Argentina) Vélez Sarsfield	
3	Nicolás Tagliafico	(Argentina)	DF	August 31, 1992 (age 34)	59	2	(Argentina) Banfield	
14	Víctor Cuesta	(Argentina)	DF	November 19, 1988 (age 37)	73	5	(Argentina) Huracán	
16	Fabricio Bustos	(Argentina)	DF	April 28, 1996 (age 30)	0	0	(Argentina) Academy	
17	Jorge Nicolás Figal	(Argentina)	DF	April 3, 1994 (age 32)	21	0	(Argentina) Olimpo	
20	Damián Martínez	(Argentina)	DF	January 31, 1990 (age 36)	1	0	(Argentina) Defensa y Justicia	
23	Néstor Breitenbruch	(Argentina)	DF	September 13, 1995 (age 31)	15	0	(Argentina) Quilmes	
26	Gustavo Toledo	(Argentina)	DF	September 19, 1989 (age 37)	54	0	(Argentina) Banfield	
Midfielders
4	Jorge Ortiz	(Argentina)	MF	June 20, 1984 (age 42)	33	1	(Argentina) Lanús	
5	Julián Vitale	(Argentina)	MF	July 21, 1995 (age 31)	21	1	(Argentina) Academy	
8	Jesús Méndez	(Argentina)	MF	August 1, 1984 (age 42)	84	2	(Argentina) Rosario Central	
10	Cristian Rodríguez	(Uruguay)	MF	September 30, 1985 (age 41)	24	3	(Brazil) Grêmio	
15	Diego Martín Rodríguez	(Argentina)	MF	September 4, 1989 (age 37)	28	1	(Argentina) Godoy Cruz	
21	Domingo Blanco	(Argentina)	MF	April 22, 1995 (age 31)	2	0	(Argentina) Academy	
22	Juan Sánchez Miño	(Argentina)	MF	January 1, 1990 (age 36)	1	0	(Brazil) Cruzeiro	
24	Emiliano Rigoni	(Argentina)	MF	February 4, 1993 (age 33)	20	6	(Argentina) Belgrano	
27	Ezeqiuel Braco	(Argentina)	MF	January 1, 1997 (age 29)	3	0	(Argentina) Academy	
-	Brian Ferreira	(Argentina)	MF	May 24, 1994 (age 32)	0	0	(Argentina) Academy	
Forwards
7	Martín Benítez	(Argentina)	FW	June 17, 1994 (age 32)	92	12	(Argentina) Academy	
9	Diego Vera	(Uruguay)	FW	January 5, 1985 (age 41)	25	3	(Argentina) Estudiantes (LP)	
11	Leandro Fernández	(Argentina)	FW	March 12, 1991 (age 35)	14	5	(Argentina) Godoy Cruz	
12	Nicolás Messiniti	(Argentina)	FW	January 1, 1996 (age 30)	0	0	(Argentina) Academy	
18	Lucas Albertengo	(Argentina)	FW	January 30, 1991 (age 35)	30	10	(Argentina) Atlético Rafaela	
19	Germán Denis	(Argentina)	FW	September 10, 1981 (age 45)	87	40	(Italy) Atalanta	
29	Jonathan Cañete	(Argentina)	FW	July 12, 1996 (age 30)	0	0	(Argentina) Academy	

=== Current coaching staff ===
Position	Staff
Coach	(Argentina) Gabriel Milito
Assistant Coach	(Argentina) Carlos Compagnucci
Assistant Coach	(Spain) Xavi Tamarit
Fitness Coach	(Argentina) Gabriel Macaya
Goalkeepers coach	(Argentina) Pablo Cavallero
Reserve team Coach	(Argentina) Fernando Berón
Youth Department	(Argentina) Jorge Griffa
Doctor	(Argentina) Dr Luis Chiaradia
Doctor	(Argentina) Dr Sergio Mauro
Kinesiology	(Argentina) Gabriel De Brasi
Kinesiology	(Argentina) Julio Zunino
Massageist	(Argentina) Christian Trobec
Props	(Argentina) Daniel Sotelo
Props	(Argentina) Mariano Bagtano

Source: clubaindependiente.com

== Transfers ==
=== Player In ===
No	Name	Nation	Pos	Moving From	Type	Fee (in $)
-	Nicolás Figal	(Argentina)	Defender	(Argentina) Olimpo	Loan Return	Free
-	Damián Martínez	(Argentina)	Defender	(Argentina) Defensa y Justicia	Transfer	500,000 $
-	Juan Sánchez Miño	(Argentina)	Forward	(Brazil) Cruzeiro	Transfer	1,400,000 $

Total spending: ▼ : 1,900,000 $

=== Player Out ===
No	Name	Nation	Pos	Moving to	Type	Fee (in $)
Summer
6	Emanuel Aguilera	(Argentina)	Defender	(Argentina) Atlético Rafaela	Transfer	2,000,000 $
20	Ezequiel Vidal	(Argentina)	Forward	(Argentina) Olimpo	End of Loan	Free
22	Claudio Aquino	(Argentina)	Midfielder	(Brazil) Fluminense	Loan Out	200,000 $
27	Rodrigo Gómez	(Argentina)	Midfielder	(Mexico) Deportivo Toluca	Transfer (50%)	1,300,000 $
29	Saúl Nelle	(Argentina)	Midfielder	(Argentina) Los Andes	Loan Out	Free
34	Rafael Barrios	(Argentina)	Goalkeeper	(Argentina) Defensa y Justicia	Transfer (80%)

Total Income ▲ : 3,500,000 $

== Pre-season ==
Win Draw Loss Postponed

2 July 2016	Independiente	3 – 0	Independiente Chivilcoy	Avellaneda
		[ Report]		Stadium: Libertadores de América

13 July 2016	Independiente	2 – 1	Villa Dálmine	Avellaneda
	Jesús Méndez; Domingo Blanco	[ Report]	Hernán Pellerano (o.g.)	Stadium: Libertadores de América

13 July 2016	Independiente	1 – 0	Villa Dálmine	Avellaneda
	Denis	[ Report]		Stadium: Libertadores de América

16 July 2016	Independiente	4 – 0	(Uruguay) Defensor Sporting	Avellaneda
	Denis; Benítez, Rigoni	[ Report]		Stadium: Libertadores de América

23 July 2016	Independiente	0 – 1	Aldosivi	Avellaneda, Argentina
			Lugüercio	Stadium: Libertadores de América

30 July 2016	Gimnasia LP	1 – 1	Independiente	La Plata
15:00	Carrera 62'	[ Report]	Germán Denis 17'	Stadium: Ciudad de La Plata

== Competitions ==
=== Overall ===
Last updated on 21 June 2016

Competition	Started round	Current position / round	Final position / round	First match	Last match
Primera División	–	–	–	TBA	TBA
Copa Argentina	Round of 64	Round of 32	N/A	4 May 2016	N/A
Copa Sudamericana	Second stage	Second stage	N/A	TBA	N/A

=== Overview ===
Last updated on 21 June 2016

Competition	Record							
Competition	G	W	D	L	GF	GA	GD	Win %
Primera División	0	0	0	0	0	0	+0	—
Copa Argentina	0	0	0	0	0	0	+0	—
Copa Sudamericana	0	0	0	0	0	0	+0	—
Total	0	0	0	0	0	0	+0	—

== Primera División ==
Win Draw Loss Postponed

Round 1	Belgrano	v	Independiente	Córdoba
				Stadium: Mario Alberto Kempes

Round 2	Independiente	v	Godoy Cruz	Avellaneda
				Stadium: Libertadores de América

Round 3	Quilmes	v	Independiente	Quilmes
				Stadium: Centenario Dr. José Luis Meiszner

Round 4	Independiente	v	Tigre	Avellaneda
				Stadium: Libertadores de América

Round 5	Sarmiento	v	Independiente	Junín
				Stadium: Eva Perón

Round 6	Independiente	v	Atlético Tucumán	Avellaneda
				Stadium: Libertadores de América

Round 7	Temperley	v	Independiente	Turdera
				Stadium: Alfredo Beranger

Round 8	Independiente	v	Gimnasia LP	Avellaneda
				Stadium: Libertadores de América

Round 9	Rosario Central	v	Independiente	Rosario
				Stadium: Gigante de Arroyito

Round 10	Independiente	v	San Lorenzo	Avellaneda
				Stadium: Libertadores de América

Round 11	Racing Club	v	Independiente	Avellaneda
				Stadium: Presidente Juan Domingo Perón

Round 12	Independiente	v	River Plate	Avellaneda
				Stadium: Libertadores de América

Round 13	Colón	v	Independiente	Santa Fe
				Stadium: Brigadier General Estanislao López

Round 14	Independiente	v	Banfield	Avellaneda
				Stadium: Libertadores de América

Round 15	Talleres (Córdoba)	v	Independiente	Córdoba
				Stadium: Mario Alberto Kempes

Round 16	Independiente	v	San Martín (San Juan)	Avellaneda
				Stadium: Libertadores de América

Round 17	Defensa y Justicia	v	Independiente	Buenos Aires
				Stadium: Norberto "Tito" Tomaghello

Round 18	Independiente	v	Vélez Sarsfield	Avellaneda
				Stadium: Libertadores de América

Round 19	Patronato	v	Independiente	Paraná
				Stadium: Presbítero Bartolomé Grella

Round 20	Independiente	v	Atlético Rafaela	Avellaneda
				Stadium: Libertadores de América

Round 21	Arsenal	v	Independiente	Sarandí
				Stadium: Julio Humberto Grondona

Round 22	Independiente	v	Estudiantes LP	Avellaneda
				Stadium: Libertadores de América

Round 23	Newell's Old Boys	v	Independiente	Rosario
				Stadium: Marcelo Bielsa

Round 24	Independiente	v	Racing Club	Avellaneda
				Stadium: Libertadores de América

Round 25	Independiente	v	Huracán	Avellaneda
				Stadium: Libertadores de América

Round 26	Aldosivi	v	Independiente	Mar del Plata
				Stadium: José María Minella

Round 27	Boca Juniors	v	Independiente	Buenos Aires
				Stadium: La Bombonera

Round 28	Independiente	v	Club Olimpo	Avellaneda
				Stadium: Libertadores de América

Round 29	Unión Santa Fe	v	Independiente	Santa Fe
				Stadium: 15 de Abril

Round 30	Independiente	v	Lanús	Avellaneda
				Stadium: Libertadores de América

=== League table ===
Pos	Team	Pld	W	D	L	GF	GA	GD	Pts	Qualification
4	Racing	30	17	4	9	51	40	+11	55	Qualification for Copa Libertadores group stage
5	Banfield	30	17	3	10	42	35	+7	54	Qualification for Copa Libertadores second stage
6	Independiente	30	14	11	5	39	23	+16	53	Qualification for Copa Libertadores group stage (Note: Independiente qualified for the Copa Libertadores group stage by winning the 2017 Copa Sudamericana.)
7	San Lorenzo	30	16	5	9	46	35	+11	53	Qualification for Copa Sudamericana first stage
8	Lanús	30	14	8	8	36	25	+11	50	Qualification for Copa Sudamericana first stage

Source: AFA

=== Relegation ===
Pos	Team	2015 Pts	2016 Pts	2016–17 Pts	Total Pts	Total Pld	Avg	Relegation
3	Boca Juniors	64	20	0	84	46	1.826	
4	Estudiantes (LP)	51	32	0	83	46	1.804	
5	Independiente	54	27	0	81	46	1.761	
6	Racing	57	24	64	81	46	0.942	
7	Lanús	42	38	0	80	46	1.739	

=== Results summary ===
Overall								Home						Away					
Pld	W	D	L	GF	GA	GD	Pts	W	D	L	GF	GA	GD	W	D	L	GF	GA	GD
0	0	0	0	0	0	0	0	0	0	0	0	0	0	0	0	0	0	0	0

Last updated: 31 May 2016.

=== Results by round ===
Round	1	2	3	4	5	6	7	8	9	10	11	12	13	14	15	16	17	18	19	20	21	22	23	24	25	26	27	28	29	30
Ground																														
Result																														
Position																														

A = Away; H = Home; W = Win; D = Draw; L = Loss

== Copa Argentina ==
=== Round of 64 ===
Continue from the Previous season

4 May 2016 Round of 64	Independiente	2 – 1	San Telmo	Formosa
22:00	Víctor Cuesta (yellow card) 22'; Fernández 36'; Aquino 48'	Report	Leandro Wagner (yellow card) 45'; Nahuel Oviedo 49'; Guillermo Esteban (yellow card) 62'; Cristian Leiva (yellow card) 67'; Matías Correa (yellow card) 73'	Stadium: Estadio Antonio Romero; Referee: Pedro Argañaraz

=== Round of 32 ===
Round of 32	Independiente	v	Defensa y Justicia

== Copa Sudamericana ==
=== Second stage ===
First leg	Lanús	v	Independiente	Lanús
				Stadium: Estadio Ciudad de Lanús

Second leg	Independiente	v	Lanús	Avellaneda
				Stadium: Libertadores de América

== Statistics ==
=== Squad statistics ===
Last updated on 21 June 2016

			Primera División				Copa Argentina				Copa Sudamericana				Total			
Nation	No.	Name	GS	Min.	Goal	Assist	GS	Min.	Goal	Assist	GS	Min.	Goal	Assist	GS	Min.	Goal	Assist
Goalkeepers
Defenders
Midfielders
Forwards

=== Goals ===
Last updated on 21 June 2016

Rank	Player	Position	Primera División	Copa Argentina	Copa Sudamericana	Total
Total						

=== Clean sheets ===
Last updated on 21 June 2016

Rank	Player	Position	Primera División	Copa Argentina	Copa Sudamericana	Total
Total			0	0	0	0

=== Disciplinary record ===
Last updated on 21 June 2016

No.	Pos	Nat	Name	Primera División			Copa Argentina			Copa Sudamericana			Total			Suspended
No.	Pos	Nat	Name	Yellow card	(yellow card) (yellow-red card)	Red card	Yellow card	(yellow card) (yellow-red card)	Red card	Yellow card	(yellow card) (yellow-red card)	Red card	Yellow card	(yellow card) (yellow-red card)	Red card	

=== Overall ===
Last updated on 20 May 2016

	Total	Home	Away	Naturel
Games played	-	-	-	-
Games won	-	-	-	-
Games drawn	-	-	-	-
Games lost	-	-	-	-
Biggest win	-	-	-	-
Biggest loss	-	-	-	-
Biggest win (League)	-	-	-	N/A
Biggest win (Copa Argentina)	-	N/A	N/A	-
Biggest win (Copa Sudamericana)	-	-	-	N/A
Biggest loss (League)	-	-	-	N/A
Biggest loss (Copa Argentina)	-	N/A	N/A	-
Biggest loss (Copa Sudamericana)	-	-	-	N/A
Clean sheets	-	-	-	-
Goals scored	-	-	-	-
Goals conceded	-	-	-	-
Goal difference	-	-	-	-
Average GF per game	-	-	-	-
Average GA per game	-	-	-	-
Yellow cards	-	-	-	-
Red cards	-	-	-	-
Most appearances	-	–		
Most minutes played	-	–		
Most goals	–	–		
Penalties for	-	-	-	-
Penalties against	-	-	-	-
