= Sarulyte =

Sarulyte is a surname. Notable people with the surname include:

- Juan Andrés Sarulyte (born 1962), Argentine football manager and former player
- Matías Sarulyte (born 1989), Argentine footballer
