= Martín Campaña =

Uruguayan footballer (born 1989)

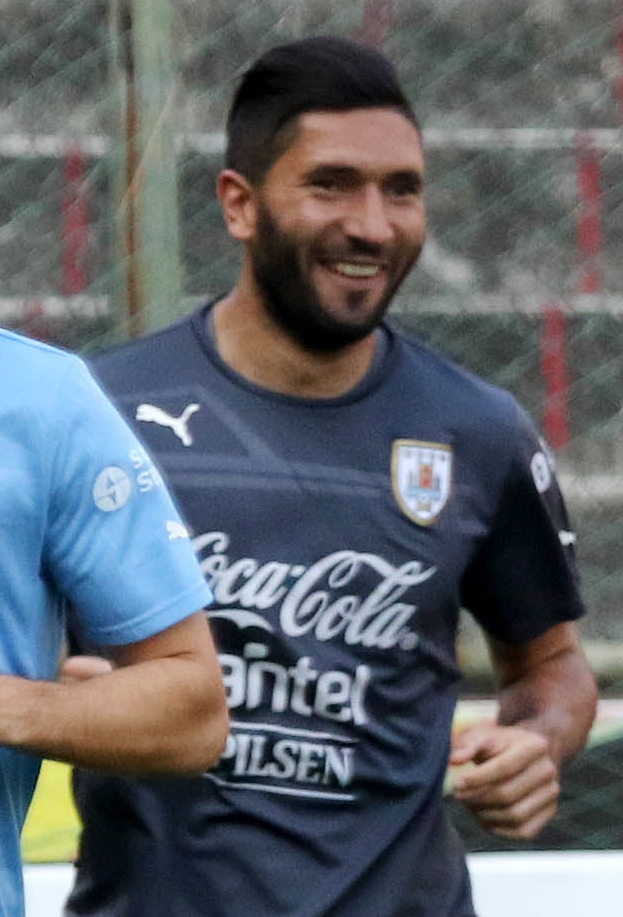
- Campaña with Uruguay in 2018

Personal information
- Full name: Martín Nicolás Campaña Delgado
- Date of birth: 29 May 1989 (age 37)
- Place of birth: Maldonado, Uruguay
- Height: 1.85 m (6 ft 1 in)
- Position: Goalkeeper

Team information
- Current team: Liverpool
- Number: 25

Youth career
- Atlético Fernandino
- Urusol
- Deportivo Maldonado
- 2002–2006: Defensor Sporting

Senior career*
Years	Team	Apps	(Gls)
2007–2008	Defensor Sporting	0	(0)
2007	→ Deportivo Maldonado (loan)	15	(0)
2008	→ Atenas (loan)	18	(0)
2008–2013	Cerro Largo	76	(0)
2010–2011	→ Racing Montevideo (loan)	1	(0)
2013–2016	Defensor Sporting	82	(0)
2016	→ Independiente (loan)	24	(0)
2017–2020	Independiente	86	(0)
2020–2023	Al-Batin	79	(0)
2023–2024	Al-Riyadh	33	(0)
2025	Peñarol	21	(0)
2026–	Liverpool	0	(0)

International career
2007–2009	Uruguay U20	2	(0)
2012	Uruguay Olympic	6	(0)
2016–2022	Uruguay	9	(0)
- * Club domestic league appearances and goals as of 06 July 2025

Martín Nicolás Campaña Delgado (born 29 May 1989) is a Uruguayan professional footballer who plays as a goalkeeper for Uruguayan Primera División club Liverpool.

== Club career ==
=== Early career ===
Born in Maldonado, Campaña joined Defensor Sporting's youth setup at the age of 13, from hometown side Deportivo Maldonado. In 2006, after finishing his formation, he moved back to his previous club on loan, and was assigned to the first team in Segunda División.

In January 2008 Campaña moved to fellow second division side Atenas de San Carlos also in a temporary deal, playing regularly as his side narrowly missed out promotion.

=== Cerro Largo ===
Released by Danubio in the middle of 2008, Campaña joined Cerro Largo of the Primera División. He made his debut for the club on 9 November, starting in a 5–2 away loss to Bella Vista.

Campaña spent his first season as a backup to Fernando Pérez, but was chosen as first-choice ahead of the 2009–10 campaign, overtaking Pérez and new signing Nicolás Gentilio. He was an undisputed starter for the club during year, but suffered team relegation.

After Cerro Largo's relegation Campaña was loaned to fellow top-tier club Racing de Montevideo, for one year. A second-choice to Jorge Contreras, his only match for the club occurred on 13 November 2010 in a 2–0 loss at Danubio.

Returning to Cerro Largo for 2011–12, Campaña was again an undisputed starter as his side achieved qualification for 2012 Copa Sudamericana by finishing fourth.

=== Defensor Sporting ===
In January 2013, he moved back to his first club Defensor on a six-month loan deal. An immediate starter due to Yonatan Irrazábal's injury, he finished the season with twelve appearances.

Bought outright in June 2013, Campaña became a first-choice ahead of Irrazábal, being an important unit as his side reached the semifinals of the 2014 Copa Libertadores.

=== Independiente ===
On 12 January 2016, Campaña moved abroad for the first time in his career, after agreeing to a 18-month deal with Independiente. He made his debut for the club on 6 March, starting in a 4–1 home routing of Colón.

Campaña became an immediate starter ahead of youth graduates Diego Rodríguez and Gonzalo Rehak.

=== Saudi Arabia ===
On 24 September 2020, Campaña joined Saudi Arabian club Al-Batin on a two-year contract. On 10 July 2022, Campaña renewed his contract with the club until the 2023–24 season.

On 7 June 2023, Campaña joined newly promoted Pro League side Al-Riyadh.

== International career ==
Campaña represented Uruguay at under-20 level at the 2009 FIFA U-20 World Cup in Egypt, but as the third goalkeeper. He was called up by Óscar Tabárez for the 2012 Summer Olympics being held in London, Great Britain, playing all three matches of the tournament as his side was knocked out in the group stage.

Campaña made his full international debut for Uruguay on 27 May 2016, replacing Martín Silva late into a 3–1 friendly win over Trinidad and Tobago. In May 2018, he was named in Uruguay's provisional 26-man squad for the 2018 FIFA World Cup in Russia, being also included in the final list on 2 June.

== Career statistics ==
=== Club ===
As of match played 23 May 2024

Appearances and goals by club, season and competition
Club	Season	League			Cup		Continental		Other		Total	
Club	Season	Division	Apps	Goals	Apps	Goals	Apps	Goals	Apps	Goals	Apps	Goals
Deportivo Maldonado	2007–08	Uruguayan Segunda División	15	0	—		—		—		15	0
Atenas	2007–08	Uruguayan Segunda División	18	0	—		—		—		18	0
Cerro Largo	2008–09	Uruguayan Primera División	7	0	—		—		—		7	0
Cerro Largo	2009–10	Uruguayan Primera División	24	0	—		—		—		24	0
Cerro Largo	2011–12	Uruguayan Primera División	30	0	—		—		—		30	0
Cerro Largo	2012–13	Uruguayan Primera División	15	0	—		—		—		15	0
Cerro Largo	Total		76	0	—		—		—		76	0
Defensor Sporting	2012–13	Uruguayan Primera División	12	0	—		0	0	—		12	0
Defensor Sporting	2013–14	Uruguayan Primera División	26	0	—		10 (Note: Appearance(s) in Copa Libertadores)	0	—		36	0
Defensor Sporting	2014–15	Uruguayan Primera División	29	0	—		2	0	—		31	0
Defensor Sporting	2015–16	Uruguayan Primera División	15	0	—		8 (Note: Appearance(s) in Copa Sudamericana)	0	—		23	0
Defensor Sporting	Total		82	0	—		20	0	—		102	0
Racing Montevideo (loan)	2010–11	Uruguayan Primera División	1	0	—		—		—		1	0
Independiente (loan)	2016	Argentine Primera División	11	0	1	0	—		—		12	0
Independiente (loan)	2016–17	Argentine Primera División	13	0	1	0	4	0	—		18	0
Independiente	2016–17	Argentine Primera División	16	0	1	0	2	0	—		19	0
Independiente	2017–18	Argentine Primera División	23	0	1	0	16 (Note: Ten appearances in Copa Sudamericana, six appearances in Copa Libertadores)	0	—		40	0
Independiente	2018–19	Argentine Primera División	24	0	3	0	8 (Note: Four appearances in Copa Libertadores, four appearances in Copa Sudamericana)	0	5 (Note: Two appearances in Recopa Sudamericana, two appearances in Copa de la Superliga, one appearance in Suruga Bank Championship)	0	40	0
Independiente	2019–20	Argentine Primera División	23	0	3	0	6	0	1 (Note: Appearances in Copa de la Superliga)	0	33	0
Independiente	Total		110	0	10	0	36	0	6	0	162	0
Al Batin	2020–21	Saudi Pro League	27	0	0	0	—		—		27	0
Al Batin	2021–22	Saudi Pro League	29	0	2	0	—		—		31	0
Al Batin	2022–23	Saudi Pro League	23	0	0	0	—		—		23	0
Al Batin	Total		79	0	2	0	—		—		81	0
Al-Riyadh	2023–24	Saudi Pro League	33	0	1	0	—		—		34	0
Career total			414	0	13	0	56	0	6	0	489	0

=== International ===
As of match played 17 November 2020

Appearances and goals by national team and year
National team	Year	Apps	Goals
Uruguay	2014	0	0
Uruguay	2015	0	0
Uruguay	2016	1	0
Uruguay	2017	0	0
Uruguay	2018	2	0
Uruguay	2019	2	0
Uruguay	2020	4	0
Uruguay	2021	0	0
Uruguay	2022	0	0
Total		9	0

== Honours ==
Independiente

- Copa Sudamericana: 2017
- Suruga Bank Championship: 2018
