= Juan Andrés Sarulyte =

Argentine footballer and manager

Personal information
- Full name: Juan Andrés Sarulyte
- Date of birth: 18 April 1962 (age 64)
- Place of birth: Buenos Aires, Argentina
- Height: 1.72 m (5 ft 8 in)
- Position: Forward

Youth career
- Racing Club

Senior career*
Years	Team	Apps	(Gls)
1981–1987	Racing Club		
1983	→ Santiago Wanderers (loan)	27	(8)
1985	→ Racing de Colón (loan)	–	(–)
1987	→ Racing de Colón (loan)	–	(–)

Managerial career
- 1998–1999: Atlante (assistant)
- 1999–2000: Sportivo Italiano
- 2000–2002: Zacatepec
- 2002–2004: Sportivo Italiano
- 2004: Leones Morelos (assistant)
- 2004–2008: Alianza (assistant)
- 2011–2012: Once Municipal
- 2012: El Salvador (assistant)
- 2012–2013: Once Municipal
- 2013: Alianza
- 2015: Pasaquina
- 2015: Chalatenango
- 2015–2016: Audaz
- 2016: Atlético Marte
- 2017: Once Municipal
- 2020: Jocoro
- 2020: Santa Tecla
- * Club domestic league appearances and goals

Juan Andrés Sarulyte (born 18 April 1962) is an Argentine football manager and former player.

== Playing career ==
A product of Racing Club de Avellaneda, Sarulyte stood out in 1982, the year of his professional debut. The next seasons, he mainly played on loan for Chilean club Santiago Wanderers in 1983 and Racing Club de Colón in 1985 and 1987.

He retired in 1987 after suffering an ACL.

== Managerial career ==
On 23 April 2012, he was announced that he will be the assistant coach to complete the coaching squad under the strategist Rubén Israel for the El Salvador national football team, chosen by Executive Comite of FESFUT.

== Personal life ==
He is the father of the footballer Matías Sarulyte.

== Honours ==
=== Player ===
Racing de Colón

- Liga de Colón: 1985

=== Manager ===
Once Municipal

- Primera División runner-up: Apertura 2011
