= Adrián Fernández (footballer, born 1992) =

Paraguayan footballer

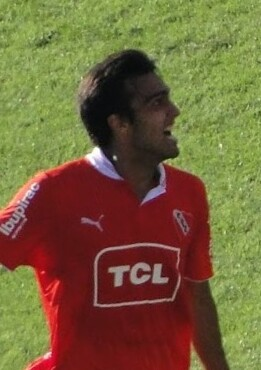
- Fernández in action

Personal information
- Full name: Nestor Adrián Fernández Palacios
- Date of birth: 4 August 1992 (age 34)
- Place of birth: Asunción, Paraguay
- Height: 1.84 m (6 ft 0 in)
- Position: Forward

Team information
- Current team: ADT
- Number: 37

Senior career*
Years	Team	Apps	(Gls)
2013–2014	Independiente	23	(5)
2014–2015	Quilmes	19	(2)
2015–2016	Libertad	7	(3)
2016	Independiente Rivadavia	12	(1)
2017	Sportivo Luqueño	13	(2)
2017–2018	Almagro	20	(0)
2018	Ferrocarril Urquiza	11	(0)
2019	C.S. San Lorenzo	28	(2)
2020	Racing Club de Montevideo	6	(1)
2021	Portuguesa F.C.	29	(14)
2022–	Alianza Atlético	90	(31)
- * Club domestic league appearances and goals as of 28 October 2024

Nestor Adrián Fernández Palacios (born 4 August 1992) is a Paraguayan professional footballer who plays as a forward for Peruvian Primera División side ADT. Nicknamed "Halcón".
