= Matías Pisano =

Argentine footballer

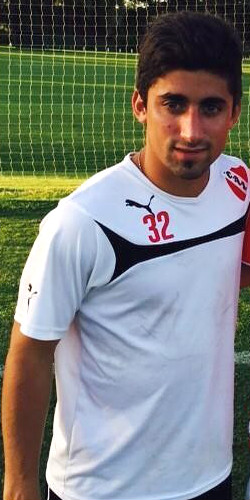

Personal information
- Full name: Matías Pisano
- Date of birth: 13 December 1991 (age 34)
- Place of birth: Buenos Aires, Argentina
- Height: 1.66 m (5 ft 5 1/2 in)
- Position: Right winger

Team information
- Current team: Cúcuta

Youth career
- 2005–2008: Chacarita

Senior career*
Years	Team	Apps	(Gls)
2008–2013	Chacarita	58	(11)
2013–2015	Independiente	69	(7)
2016–2017	Cruzeiro	4	(1)
2016	→ Santa Cruz (loan)	11	(1)
2017–2018	Club Tijuana	13	(0)
2018	Talleres	6	(0)
2018–2019	Aldosivi	21	(3)
2019–2020	América de Cali	31	(5)
2020	Ittihad Kalba	0	(0)
2021	Argentinos Juniors	8	(0)
2021–2022	Atromitos	4	(0)
2022	Aldosivi	30	(2)
2023	Palmaflor	17	(5)
2024	Chacarita Juniors	28	(6)
2025–	Cúcuta	7	(2)
- * Club domestic league appearances and goals as of 19:21, 19 March 2025 (UTC)

Matías Pisano (born 13 December 1991) is an Argentine professional footballer who plays as a right winger for Categoría Primera B club Cúcuta.

== Club career ==
=== Chacarita ===
Pisano started playing in the youth divisions of Chacarita Juniors and debuted in 2009 in a match against Fénix in the Primera B Nacional where he started from the bench and scored his first goal and the match ended in a 2–0 victory with an assistance of him in the final goal.

=== Independiente ===
Pisano signed for Independiente in July 2013, requested by coach Miguel Brindisi to play in the Primera B Nacional after the club was relegated for the first time in their history. At the end of the year he received the B Nacional Revelation Player by Diario Clarín

=== Atromitos ===
On 30 June 2021, he was announced by Greek Super League side Atromitos as their fifth transfer for the upcoming season, on a one-year contract.

== Career statistics ==
As of match played 11 April 2015.

Club	Season	League				Cup			Continental			Total		
Club	Season	Division	Apps	Goals	Assists	Apps	Goals	Assists	Apps	Goals	Assists	Apps	Goals	Assists
Chacarita	2008–09	Primera B Nacional	1	1	1	–			–			1	1	1
Chacarita	2009–10	Primera División	6	0	2	–			–			6	0	2
Chacarita	2010–11	Primera B Nacional	13	0	3	–			–			13	0	3
Chacarita	2011-12	Primera B Nacional	3	0	3	1	0	0	–			4	0	3
Chacarita	2012-13	Primera B Metropolitana	35	10	2	2	1	0	–			37	11	2
Chacarita	Total		58	11	11	3	1	0	–			61	12	11
Independiente	2013–14	Primera B Nacional	41	4	7	3	0	2	–			43	4	9
Independiente	2014	Primera División	16	1	7	0	0	0	–			16	1	7
Independiente	2015	Primera División	8	1	5	0	0	0	0	0	0	8	1	5
Independiente	Total		65	6	19	3	0	2	0	0	0	68	8	21
Career total			122	17	29	6	1	2	0	0	0	129	18	32
