= Ismael Benegas =

Paraguayan footballer (born 1987)

Personal information
- Full name: Ismael Benegas Arévalos
- Date of birth: 1 August 1987 (age 39)
- Place of birth: Zeballos Cué, Paraguay
- Height: 1.83 m (6 ft 0 in)
- Position: Centre back

Team information
- Current team: Club Sol de América
- Number: 30

Senior career*
Years	Team	Apps	(Gls)
2009–2010	Libertad	22	(0)
2011	Rubio Ñu	15	(0)
2011–2015	Libertad	84	(5)
2013–2014	→ Nacional (loan)	24	(1)
2015–2016	Colón	28	(1)
2016–2017	Quilmes	12	(0)
2017–2018	San Martín Tucumán	28	(1)
2018–2019	Guaraní	8	(1)
2019–2020	Wilstermann	37	(1)
2021	Royal Pari	23	(2)
2022	The Strongest	19	(1)
2023–2024	Club Nacional	39	(0)
2024–	Club Sol de América	3	(0)

International career
2011–	Paraguay	3	(0)
- * Club domestic league appearances and goals as of 14:34, 14 October 2019 (UTC)

Ismael Benegas Arévalos (born 1 August 1987 in Zeballos Cué) is a Paraguayan professional footballer who currently plays for Club Sol de América.
