= Néstor Moiraghi =

Argentine footballer

Personal information
- Full name: Néstor Emanuel Moiraghi
- Date of birth: 19 April 1985 (age 41)
- Place of birth: Cipolletti, Argentina
- Height: 1.82 m (6 ft 0 in)
- Position: Centre-back

Team information
- Current team: Olimpo

Youth career
- Lanús

Senior career*
Years	Team	Apps	(Gls)
2003–2005	Lanús	2	(0)
2005	Maracaibo	11	(0)
2005–2006	Dinamo Tirana	14	(0)
2006–2007	Lanús	1	(0)
2008	Temperley	18	(2)
2009–2010	Rampla Juniors	38	(3)
2011–2012	Defensor Sporting	45	(1)
2012–2016	Olimpo	128	(3)
2012–2017	Newell's Old Boys	28	(0)
2017–2018	Deportivo Cali	21	(1)
2018–2021	Tigre	37	(0)
2021	San Luis	30	(2)
2022	Agropecuario	30	(1)
2023–2024	San Luis	49	(0)
2025–	Olimpo	36	(2)
- * Club domestic league appearances and goals as of 16:22, 14 April 2026 (UTC)

Néstor Emanuel Moiraghi (born 19 April 1985 in Cipolletti, Argentina) is an Argentine footballer who plays as a centre-back for Olimpo.

== Club career ==
He has previously played for Dinamo Tirana in Albania during the 2005–2006 season, which is his only time spent playing in Europe in his entire career.

On 31 January 2011, he signed a new deal with the Uruguayan side Defensor Sporting.
