= Facundo Daffonchio =

Argentine footballer (born 1990)

Personal information
- Date of birth: 2 February 1990 (age 36)
- Place of birth: Junín Province, Buenos Aires, Argentina
- Height: 1.87 m (6 ft 1 1/2 in)
- Position: Goalkeeper

Youth career
- 2001–2010: Independiente

Senior career*
Years	Team	Apps	(Gls)
2010–2016	Independiente	0	(0)
2016–2018	Atlético Tucumán	0	(0)
2018–2021	Sarmiento	0	(0)
- * Club domestic league appearances and goals as of 6 August 2016

Facundo Daffonchio is an Argentine footballer who plays as a goalkeeper.
