= Diego Rodríguez (footballer, born 1989) =

Uruguayan footballer

Personal information
- Full name: Diego Martín Rodríguez Berrini
- Date of birth: 4 September 1989 (age 37)
- Place of birth: Montevideo, Uruguay
- Height: 1.70 m (5 ft 7 in)
- Position: Defensive midfielder

Team information
- Current team: Liverpool
- Number: 15

Senior career*
| Years | Team | Apps | (Gls) |
| 2009–2014 | Defensor Sporting | 87 | (4) |
| 2013 | → Udinese (loan) | 1 | (0) |
| 2013–2014 | → Godoy Cruz (loan) | 70 | (2) |
| 2015–2018 | Independiente | 56 | (2) |
| 2018–2021 | Tijuana | 36 | (0) |
| 2019 | → Defensa y Justicia (loan) | 14 | (0) |
| 2020 | → San Lorenzo (loan) | 16 | (1) |
| 2021 | San Lorenzo | 13 | (0) |
| 2021–2023 | Nacional | 66 | (1) |
| 2024– | Liverpool | 46 | (0) |

International career
| 2008–2009 | Uruguay U-20 | 8 | (0) |
| 2011 | Uruguay U-22 | 5 | (0) |
| 2012 | Uruguay Olympic | 4 | (0) |
- * Club domestic league appearances and goals as of 1 October 2025

Diego Martín Rodríguez Berrini (born 4 September 1989) is a Uruguayan footballer who plays as a defensive midfielder for Liverpool.

== Club career ==
Rodríguez started his career playing with Defensor Sporting in 2009. He made his debut on 27 October 2009 against Tacuarembó F.C.

== International career ==
=== Under-20 ===
During 2009 Rodríguez played with the Uruguayan national under-20 football team at the 2009 FIFA U-20 World Cup in Egypt. Previously, he played at the 2009 South American U-20 Championship in Venezuela where his outstanding performances led the team to qualify to the Youth World Cup.

=== Under-22 ===
In 2011, he was named in the Uruguay national football team under-22 squad for the 2011 Pan American Games. He was the team captain and played a vital role for the team, helping them to reach 3rd place in the tournament.

=== Olympic Team ===
He was called up by Óscar Tabárez to the Uruguayan Olympic football team that finished ninth at the 2012 Summer Olympics, held in London, Great Britain.

=== Senior ===
On 7 November 2011 he was named in the squad for a FIFA World Cup qualification match against Chile in Montevideo.

On 15 November 2011 he was named in the squad for a friendly match against Italy in Rome.
