= Diego Rodríguez (goalkeeper) =

Argentine footballer

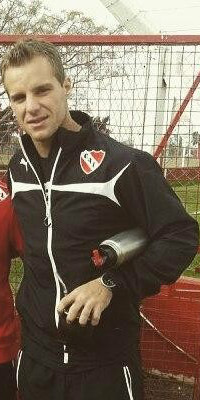
- Rodríguez with Independiente in 2015

Personal information
- Full name: Diego Matías Rodríguez Marrón
- Date of birth: 25 June 1989 (age 37)
- Place of birth: Mar del Plata, Argentina
- Height: 1.84 m (6 ft 0 in)
- Position: Goalkeeper

Team information
- Current team: Banfield
- Number: 50

Youth career
- Independiente

Senior career*
Years	Team	Apps	(Gls)
2011–2017	Independiente	111	(9)
2016–2017	→ Rosario Central (loan)	19	(0)
2017–2019	Rosario Central	6	(0)
2018	→ JEF United Chiba (loan)	20	(0)
2019–2021	Defensa y Justicia	0	(0)
2019–2020	→ Central Córdoba (loan)	22	(0)
2020–2021	→ Elche (loan)	0	(0)
2021–2022	Panetolikos	5	(0)
2022–2024	Godoy Cruz	67	(3)
2024–2026	Argentinos Juniors	73	(0)
2026–	Banfield	10	(0)

International career
2009	Argentina U20	5	(0)
- * Club domestic league appearances and goals as of 17:58, 8 November 2026 (UTC)

Diego Matías Rodríguez Marrón (Latin American Spanish: [ˈdjeɣo maˈti.as roˈðɾiɣes]; born 25 June 1989) is an Argentine professional footballer who plays as a goalkeeper for Banfield.

== Club career ==
Born in Mar del Plata, Rodríguez made his debut in Independiente on 16 June 2011 against Huracán when coach Antonio Mohamed had to put him in the first team since Hilario Navarro, Fabián Assman and Adrián Gabbarini were all injured.

Rodríguez subsequently represented Rosario Central, JEF United Chiba, Defensa y Justicia and Central Córdoba before joining La Liga side Elche CF on 5 October 2020. He terminated his contract with the latter club on 1 February 2021, after just three cup matches.

== International career ==
Rodríguez was called up by coach Sergio Batista as part of the Argentina U-20 team for the 2009 South American U-20 Championship He was a key player in the match against Ecuador that let the team advance to the second round where they were eventually eliminated.

== Career statistics ==
=== Club ===
As of match played 9 January 2025

Appearances and goals by club, season and competition
Club	Season	League			National Cup		Continental		Other		Total	
Club	Season	Division	Apps	Goals	Apps	Goals	Apps	Goals	Apps	Goals	Apps	Goals
Independiente	2010–11	Argentine Primera División	1	0	—		—		—		1	0
Independiente	2011–12	Argentine Primera División	3	0	1	0	—		—		4	0
Independiente	2012–13	Argentine Primera División	20	0	—		3 (Note: Appearance(s) in Copa Sudamericana)	0	—		23	0
Independiente	2013–14	Primera B Nacional	40	2	—		—		—		40	2
Independiente	2014	Argentine Primera División	19	3	2	0	—		—		21	3
Independiente	2015	Argentine Primera División	33	4	2	0	6	0	—		41	4
Independiente	2016	Argentine Primera División	5	0	0	0	0	0	3 (Note: Appearance(s) in Torneos de Verano)	0	8	0
Independiente	Total		111	9	5	0	9	0	3	0	128	9
Rosario Central (loan)	2016–17	Argentine Primera División	19	0	0	0	—		1	0	20	0
Rosario Central	2017–18	Argentine Primera División	6	0	4	0	—		—		10	0
JEF United Chiba (loan)	2018	J2 League	20	0	—		—		—		20	0
Defensa y Justicia	2018–19	Argentine Primera División	0	0	0	0	0	0	0	0	0	0
Defensa y Justicia	2019–20	Argentine Primera División	—		0	0	0	0	0	0	0	0
Defensa y Justicia	Total		0	0	0	0	0	0	0	0	0	0
Central Córdoba (loan)	2019–20	Argentine Primera División	22	0	2	0	—		1 (Note: Appearance(s) in Copa de la Superliga)	0	25	0
Elche (loan)	2020–21	La Liga	0	0	3	0	—		—		3	0
Panetolikos	2021–22	Super League Greece	5	0	3	0	—		—		8	0
Godoy Cruz	2022	Argentine Primera División	25	0	1	0	—		—		26	0
Godoy Cruz	2023	Argentine Primera División	42	3	0	0	—		—		42	3
Godoy Cruz	Total		67	3	1	0	—		—		68	3
Argentinos Juniors	2024	Argentine Primera División	43	0	3	0	5	0	—		51	0
Career Total			303	12	21	0	14	0	5	0	343	12
