= Jesús Méndez =

Argentine footballer

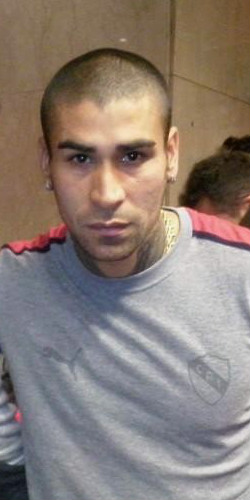

Personal information
- Full name: Jesús David José Méndez
- Date of birth: August 1, 1984 (age 42)
- Place of birth: San Rafael, Argentina
- Height: 1.78 m (5 ft 10 in)
- Position: Centre midfielder

Team information
- Current team: Independiente Rivadavia

Senior career*
Years	Team	Apps	(Gls)
2004–2006	River Plate	20	(0)
2006	→ Olimpo (loan)	16	(2)
2007	St. Gallen	29	(0)
2008–2009	Rosario Central	55	(3)
2010–2013	Boca Juniors	36	(0)
2011	→ Rosario Central (loan)	17	(0)
2012–2013	→ Rosario Central (loan)	59	(8)
2014	Rosario Central	17	(1)
2014–2016	Independiente	47	(2)
2016–2017	Toluca	40	(3)
2018	Vélez Sarsfield	7	(0)
2020	Deportivo Maipú	2	(0)
2020–	Independiente Rivadavia	0	(0)

International career
2009–2010	Argentina	2	(0)
- * Club domestic league appearances and goals as of 11:59, 17 November 2020 (UTC)

Jesús David José Méndez (born 1 August 1984) is an Argentine football midfielder who currently plays for Independiente Rivadavia.

== Career ==
Méndez made his league debut for River Plate in a 2–1 away win at Atlético Rafaela on 3 March 2004. In 2006 he had a loan spell with Olimpo, before joining St. Gallen of Switzerland in 2007. Méndez returned to Argentina in 2008 to play for Rosario Central.

In January 2010, he signed for Boca Juniors. After two loan spells playing again for Rosario Central, the midfielder joined Independiente in 2014.

Méndez played two years in Mexico with Toluca, before returning to Argentina to play for Vélez Sarsfield in the second semester of the 2017–18 Argentine Primera División.

Thirty four year old Méndez announced his retirement at the beginning of 2019, after playing some games with Vélez. However, a year later, at the beginning of 2020, Méndez returned to the pitch and joined Deportivo Maipú where he managed to play some games before the start of the quarantine and the suspension of all tournaments due to the COVID-19 pandemic. His contract at Maipú expired in June 2020 and he then joined Independiente Rivadavia a few months later.
