= Lucas Albertengo =

Argentine footballer (born 1991)

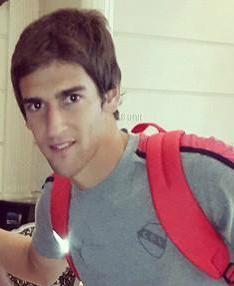

Personal information
- Full name: Lucas Gabriel Albertengo
- Date of birth: 30 January 1991 (age 35)
- Place of birth: Egusquiza, Castellanos, Argentina
- Height: 1.78 m (5 ft 10 in)
- Position: Forward

Team information
- Current team: Atlético de Rafaela

Youth career
- –2012: Atlético de Rafaela

Senior career*
| Years | Team | Apps | (Gls) |
| 2012–2015 | Atlético de Rafaela | 64 | (15) |
| 2015–2020 | Independiente | 48 | (12) |
| 2018 | → Monterrey (loan) | 8 | (1) |
| 2018–2019 | → Estudiantes (loan) | 19 | (3) |
| 2019–2020 | → Newell's Old Boys (loan) | 21 | (3) |
| 2020–2022 | Arsenal de Sarandí | 40 | (5) |
| 2022–2023 | Defensa y Justicia | 23 | (1) |
| 2023–2024 | Instituto | 15 | (1) |
| 2024– | Atlético de Rafaela | 69 | (15) |
- * Club domestic league appearances and goals as of 18:35, 27 March 2026 (UTC)

Lucas Gabriel Albertengo (born 30 January 1991) is an Argentine professional footballer who plays as a forward for Argentine club Atlético de Rafaela.

== Honours ==
Independiente

- Copa Sudamericana: 2017
