= Jorge Ortiz (Argentine footballer) =

Argentine footballer

Personal information
- Full name: Jorge Alberto Ortiz
- Date of birth: June 20, 1984 (age 42)
- Place of birth: Castelar, Argentina
- Height: 1.80 m (5 ft 11 in)
- Position: Midfielder

Youth career
- San Lorenzo

Senior career*
Years	Team	Apps	(Gls)
2004–2008	San Lorenzo	65	(3)
2006–2007	→ Arsenal Sarandí (loan)	33	(5)
2008–2010	AIK	62	(1)
2010–2013	Arsenal Sarandí	100	(9)
2013–2015	Lanús	51	(4)
2015–2017	Independiente	33	(1)
2017	→ Tijuana (loan)	3	(0)
2017–2018	Belgrano	21	(1)
2018–2020	Tigre	36	(0)
2020–2021	Patronato	1	(0)
2021	Arsenal Sarandí	9	(0)
- * Club domestic league appearances and goals as of 16:07, 20 March 2022 (UTC)

Jorge Alberto Ortiz (Spanish pronunciation: [ˈxoɾxe oɾˈtiθ]; born June 20, 1984, in Castelar) is an Argentine football player, who plays as a midfielder.

== Career ==
Ortiz made his professional debut for San Lorenzo in 2004. He was loaned to Arsenal de Sarandí for the 2006–07 season, so he played no part in San Lorenzo's Clausura winning campaign. He returned to San Lorenzo for the start of the 2007 Apertura. Later in 2007, Ortiz moved to Swedish club AIK. Although he was plagued by injuries during his debut season for the club, he established himself as a key player for the team during the 2009 campaign where they won the double. In June 2010, AIK and Jorge Ortiz mutually decided to break off their contract, which would have expired in December 2011.

Ortiz rejoined Arsenal de Sarandí on a three-year contract by the start of the 2010–11 Argentine Primera División season. After three years and 100 league appearances with Arsenal, Ortiz left to join Lanús, where he scored 4 goals in 51 league matches before moving clubs once again, this time agreeing to join Independiente in June 2015. He made his Independiente debut on the 26th of July against Atlético de Rafaela. After going out on loan to Tijuana, he had stints at Belgrano, Tigre and a very short spell with Patronato before joining Arsenal de Sarandí for a 3rd time, Arsenal fans were very excited when one of their most successful players came back to play for their club.

=== Club ===
As of October 16, 2016.

Club statistics
Club	Season	League			Cup (Note: Includes the Copa Argentina)		League Cup		Continental (Note: Includes the Copa Libertadores and Copa Sudamericana)		Other		Total	
Club	Season	Division	Apps	Goals	Apps	Goals	Apps	Goals	Apps	Goals	Apps	Goals	Apps	Goals
Independiente	2015	Primera División	11	0	2	0	—		6 (Note: Six appearances in 2015 Copa Sudamericana)	0	0	0	19	0
Independiente	2016	Primera División	12	1	1	0	—		0	0	0	0	13	1
Independiente	2016–17	Primera División	4	0	0	0	—		4 (Note: Four appearances in 2016 Copa Sudamericana)	0	0	0	8	0
Independiente	Total		27	1	3	0	—		10	0	0	0	40	1
Career total			27	1	3	0	—		10	0	0	0	40	1

== Honours ==
AIK

- Allsvenskan (1): 2009
- Svenska Cupen (1): 2009
- Supercupen (1): 2010

Arsenal

- Argentine Primera División (1): 2012 Clausura
- Supercopa Argentina (1): 2012

Lanús

- Copa Sudamericana (1): 2013
