= Matías Sarulyte =

Argentine footballer

Matías Sarulyte (born 13 March 1989) is an Argentine former professional footballer who played as a centre-back.

== Career ==
- Estudiantes de La Plata 2012–
- → Olimpo (loan) 2013–2014
- → Arsenal de Sarandí (loan) 2014–2016

== Honours ==
Estudiantes de La Plata

- Copa Libertadores de América 2009
- Argentine Primera División]] Apertura: 2010
