= Martín Benítez =

Argentine footballer (born 1994)

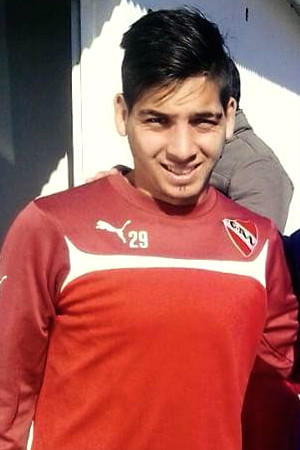

Personal information
- Full name: Martín Nicolás Benítez
- Date of birth: 17 June 1994 (age 32)
- Place of birth: Posadas, Argentina
- Height: 1.74 m (5 ft 8 1/2 in)
- Position: Attacking midfielder

Team information
- Current team: Atlético Tucumán
- Number: 7

Youth career
- Independiente

Senior career*
Years	Team	Apps	(Gls)
2011–2022	Independiente	114	(18)
2020–2021	→ Vasco da Gama (loan)	27	(2)
2021	→ São Paulo (loan)	33	(2)
2022	→ Grêmio (loan)	10	(0)
2022	→ América Mineiro (loan)	15	(1)
2023–2025	América Mineiro	53	(7)
2025–2026	Goiás	9	(0)
2026–	Atlético Tucumán	4	(1)

International career
2011–2012	Argentina U17	7	(2)
- * Club domestic league appearances and goals as of 16:38, 26 May 2026 (UTC)

Martín Nicolás Benítez (born 17 June 1994) is an Argentine professional footballer who plays as an attacking midfielder for Argentine club Atlético Tucumán.

== Club career ==
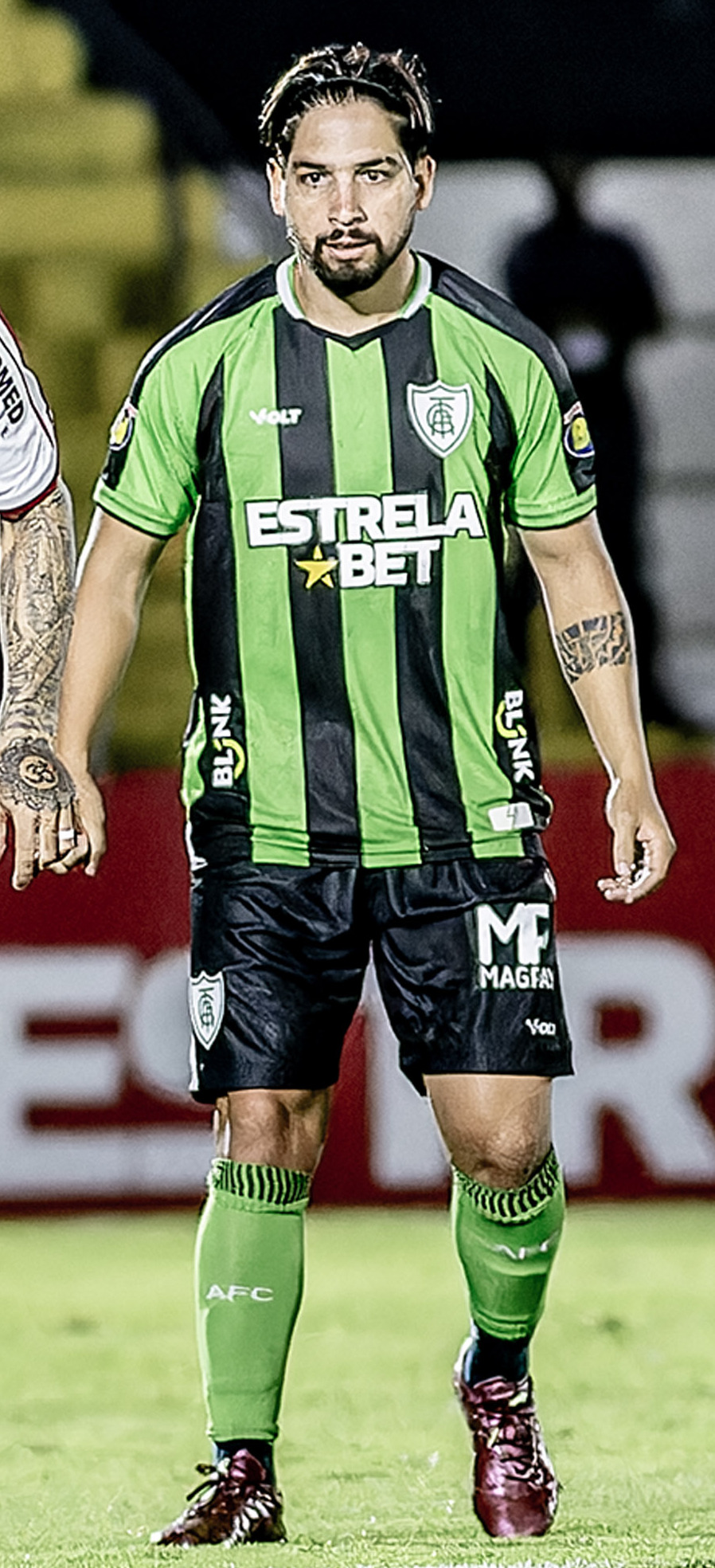
Benítez playing for América Mineiro in 2024

Benítez began playing football in his home town team called The Picada. He caught the eye of Boca Juniors who offered a trial that never materialized.

As a result, Benitez quit football because of depression. He was encouraged back into football by his family and Independiente called him up for a trial in 2009.

He travelled to the Netherlands with the reserve team to play a friendly against Ajax. Although the team lost 5–1, he scored the only goal against goalkeeper Kenneth Vermeer.

On October 13, 2011, he was called up to the first team by coach Ramón Díaz.

His debut came on November 19, when Independiente defeated Club Olimpo 3-0 playing the last twenty minutes of the match. His debut goal came on December 4, 2011, against Newell's Old Boys in a 1–1 draw.

His second goal via a header came on December 8, 2011, against San Lorenzo de Almagro.

== International career ==
He has made 7 appearances with Argentina U-17 team scoring twice, participating in two tournaments.

- 2011 South American U-17 Football Championship
- 2011 FIFA U-17 World Cup

== Honors ==
Independiente

- Copa Sudamericana: 2017

São Paulo

- Campeonato Paulista: 2021

Grêmio

- Campeonato Gaúcho: 2022
- Recopa Gaúcha: 2022
