= Gonzalo Rehak =

Argentine footballer

Personal information
- Date of birth: 11 January 1994 (age 32)
- Place of birth: Bernal, Argentina
- Height: 1.85 m (6 ft 1 in)
- Position: Goalkeeper

Team information
- Current team: Brown (Adrogué)

Youth career
- 2013–2015: Independiente

Senior career*
Years	Team	Apps	(Gls)
2015–2021	Independiente	2	(0)
2020	→ Nueva Chicago (loan)	0	(0)
2020–2021	→ Barracas Central (loan)	0	(0)
2022–	Deportivo Maipú	12	(0)
2024–	→ Brown (Adrogué) (loan)	3	(0)
- * Club domestic league appearances and goals as of 29 September 2024

Gonzalo Rehak (born 11 January 1994) is an Argentine footballer who plays as a goalkeeper for Brown (Adrogué) on loan from Deportivo Maipú.
