= Italian Peruvians =

Peruvian citizens of Italian descent

Italo-peruviani (Italian) Ítalo-peruanos (Spanish)
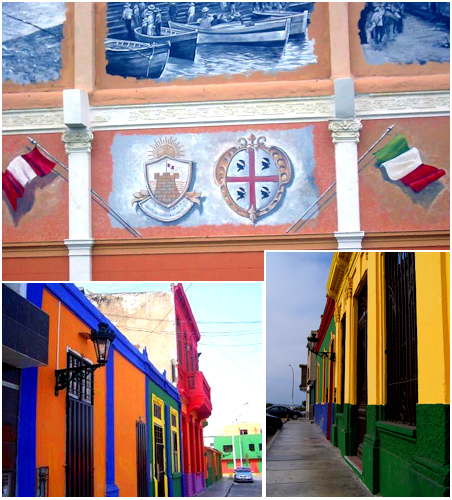
- While most Italians settled in the main cities of Peru, a group of Sicilian and Genovese fishers established in Chucuito, Callao

Total population
- c. 30,000 (by birth) c. 500,000 (by ancestry, corresponding to about 1.6% of the total Peruvian population) c. 2,000,000(Gestión, 2025).

Regions with significant populations
- Lima, Trujillo, Arequipa, Cuzco,

Languages
- Peruvian Spanish · Italian and Italian dialects

Religion
- Roman Catholic

Related ethnic groups
- Italians, Italian Americans, Italian Argentines, Italian Bolivians, Italian Brazilians, Italian Canadians, Italian Chileans, Italian Colombians, Italian Costa Ricans, Italian Cubans, Italian Dominicans, Italian Ecuadorians, Italian Guatemalans, Italian Haitians, Italian Hondurans, Italian Mexicans, Italian Panamanians, Italian Paraguayans, Italian Puerto Ricans, Italian Salvadorans, Italian Uruguayans, Italian Venezuelans

Italian Peruvians (Italian: italo-peruviani; Spanish: ítalo-peruanos) are Peruvian-born citizens who are fully or partially of Italian descent, whose ancestors were Italians who emigrated to Peru during the Italian diaspora, or Italian-born people in Peru. Among European Peruvians, Italians were the second largest group of immigrants to settle in the country. Italian immigration in Peru began in the colonial era, during the Spanish Viceroyalty of Peru.

Peak Italian immigration occurred after Peruvian independence, between 1840 and 1880, with the guano export boom. In the following years, from 1914 to 1950, waves of Italian immigration followed due to the two world wars, which destroyed most of the Italian cities, while other Italians arrived from Argentina and Brazil, mainly merchants, peasants and technicians, who then formed families in Peru, where they settled permanently.

== History ==
=== Spanish colonial era ===
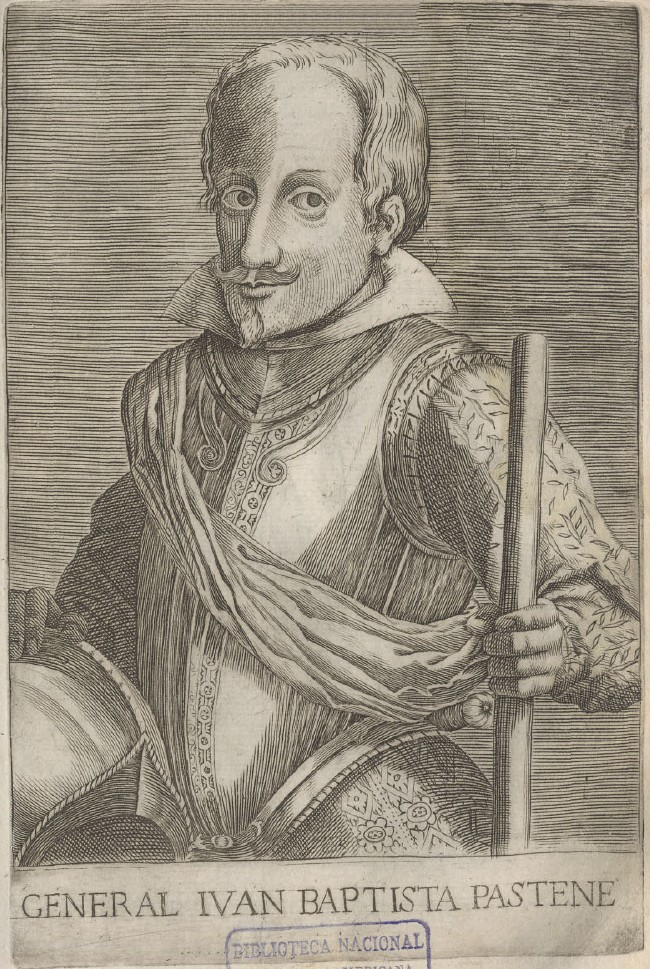
The Genoese explorer Juan Bautista Pastene

The Italian community is characterized by having started since the times of the Spanish colony in Peru. Concentrated in and around Lima, these first Italians (a few hundred only) mostly came from the Genoa area. Many of them achieved first-level political-economic positions in colonial and postcolonial Peruvian society. The presence of Ligurians in Peru since the 16th century can be explained by the bond that the Republic of Genoa had with Spain. They settled in Peru mostly to engage in trade and navigation.

Between 1532 and 1560, 50 Italians established in Lima (Viceroyalty of Peru) and Callao, mostly from Liguria and Tuscany, such as Martin from Florence, Pietro Catagno, Pietro Martín from Sicily (all of them involved in Atahualpa's capture), Juan Bautista Pastene, born in Genoa in 1507 and also present since the beginning of the Spanish Conquest of the Inca Empire.

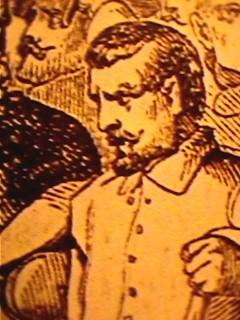
Gonzalo Pizarro, followed by some Italians

Research done by historian Alberto Boscolo in his work Presencia italiana en Andalucía: Siglos XIV-XVII, revealed that during the time of Pizarro these Italians were present in Peru: Jeronimo Bacarel (Sicily), merchant cattleman; Francisco de Bolonia (Bologna); Nicolao del Benino (Florence), merchant; Francisco Rosso (Naples), conquistador; Sebastiano Castro (Sicily); Pedro Catano (Italy), merchant; Juan Antonio Corso (Corsica), merchant; Bartolome Ferrer (Genoa), mariner merchant; Martin de Florencia (Italy), conquistador; Antonio Genoves (Genoa); Catalina la Genovesa (Valdepenaa); Esteban Genoves (Genoa), conquistador; Jacomo Genoves (Genoa); Rostran Genoves (Genoa), carpenter; Simon Genoves (Genoa), conquistador; Isabella Gentil (Seville); Cesare Maneo (Naples); Pedro Milanes (Milan), conquistador; Marco Negro (Venice); Francisco Neri (Florence), merchant; Juan de Niza (Nizza aka Nice), conquistador; Jacome Pablo (Venice); Pedro Pinelo (Italy), merchant; Diego de Pisa (Pisa), conquistador; Antonio del Solar (Median del Campo); Alonso Toscano (Tuscany), merchant; Juan Toscano (Tuscany), religious; Pedro Toscano (Tuscany), merchant; Fray Francisco Martinez (Tuscany), religious. Italians who participated in the Rebellion of Gonzalo Pizarro were Juan Bautista (Genoa, mariner), Francisco Bonifacio (Savoy) and Baptista Calvo (Genoa). Other Italians were Urbano Centurione (Genoa), merchant; Estebano Cintana (Italy), mariner; Antonio de Ecogua (Genoa), mariner; Lorenzo Fabiano (Italy); Tomas Farco (Italy); Nicolas Feo (Savoy); Bernardo Genoves (Genoa); Leon Pancaldo (Savoy), mariner; Bartolome Rabano (Italy), boatswain; Francisco Ragano (Italy); Tommaso Risso (Florence), nobleman; Juan Bautista Troche (Ventimiglia); Juan Pedro de Vivaldo (Genoa), sailing master.

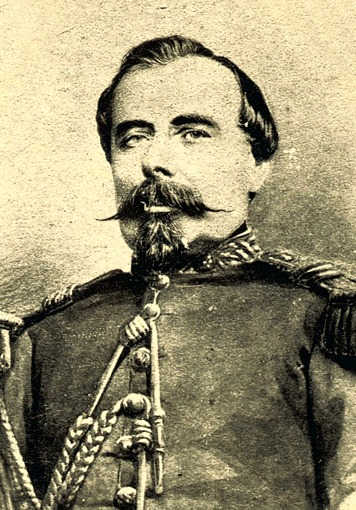
The Italian Peruvian Francisco Bolognesi, considered a national hero in Peru and declared patron of the Army of Peru

During the last decades of Spanish dominion in Peru, the number of Italians in Peru grew faster than in previous centuries (most of them came from Genoa). The richest ones were related to the marine commerce while the rest of Italians worked at small family-run business (such as grocery stores) or in larger enterprises along with their fellow Italians, as they were relatively skilled. The pioneers of the Italian immigration to Peru were Antonio Dagnino, who established in Callao in 1802 and Felix Valega, who arrived, in 1806. The best known Italian Peruvian in this historical period was General Francisco Bolognesi, son of an Italian who emigrated to Lima in the early 19th century, who distinguished himself in the War of the Pacific becoming a national hero of Peru. One of the main squares of the Peruvian capital is named after him.

=== After independence ===
After the independence of the Spanish colonies, which was caused by the crisis in Spain, the immigration of Italians to Peru increased considerably. Initially Ligurian sailors emigrated to Peru, who founded numerous commercial activities along the coasts of the country. Again from Liguria, many peasants fleeing poverty began to emigrate to Peru. The latter, having arrived in Peru, dedicated themselves to the cultivation of the land and to small trade. This migration of Italians began to be consistent starting from 1840 thanks to the conspicuous economic growth of Peru, which was caused by the export of guano.

Only after the unification of Italy in 1861 was there mass emigration, especially from the impoverished countryside of Veneto and broader Italy. The first wave of Italian immigration to an independent Peru occurred during the period 1840–1866 (the "Guano" Era): not less than 15,000 Italians arrived to Peru during this period (without counting the non-registered Italians) and established mainly in the coastal cities, especially, in Lima and Callao. They came, mostly, from the northern regions (Liguria, Piedmont, Tuscany and Lombardy). Giuseppe Garibaldi arrived to Peru in 1851, as well as other Italians who participated in the Milan rebellion like Giuseppe Eboli, Steban Siccoli, Antonio Raimondi and Arrigoni. Subsequently, there was a decline in them, as a result of the war between Chile and Peru. The great wave of Italian migration to Peru ended around 1880, after which Italians began to arrive in Peru in much smaller numbers. From 1880, there was in fact a drastic drop in the export of guano, a situation which continued also in the following decades without ever reaching the previous levels.

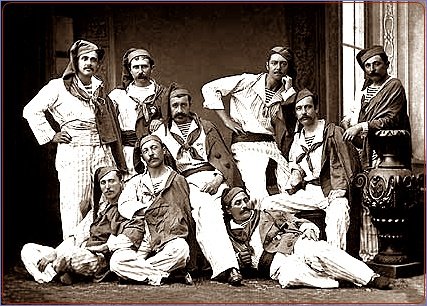
Italian immigrants in Peru in the 19th century

In addition to mercantile activities, the Italians later also dealt with the cultivation of grapes for the production of wine. In 1905, 83% of wine production was attributable to wineries founded and managed by Italians. In this context, some varieties of grapes imported from Italy were introduced in Peru. Other Italians devoted themselves to the cultivation of cotton.

The Italian immigrants in Peru were mostly merchants, who were joined by a small group of wealthy entrepreneurs. An Italian consul who traveled to various countries in South America said: "Italians are rich, very industrious and perhaps they are more active than in any other country in America." Again from a commercial point of view, in a document dated in 1863, it is reported that of the 650 pulperías in Lima, about 500 were owned by Italians. Furthermore, still in the 19th century, the Italians were the Peruvian ethnic group that mostly dealt with the cultivation of vegetables, so much so that almost all the fields cultivated with vegetables in the surroundings of Lima and Callao were cultivated by Italians. However, the wealthiest Italian immigrants were those who devoted themselves to maritime trade, especially guano. Some of them did amass huge wealth.

In 1872, the Sociedad de Inmigración Europea ("European Immigration Society") was founded in Peru. Its objective was promoting Old World immigration by covering the costs of their journeys and financially supporting them during their first settler years in Peru. Furthermore, many Italians came in search for a better future, upon the arrival they established themselves in small business. One such family was the Genoese Marsano family. One of its members, Tomás Marsano Gutiérrez, built a palace in 1941 which was demolished in 2002.

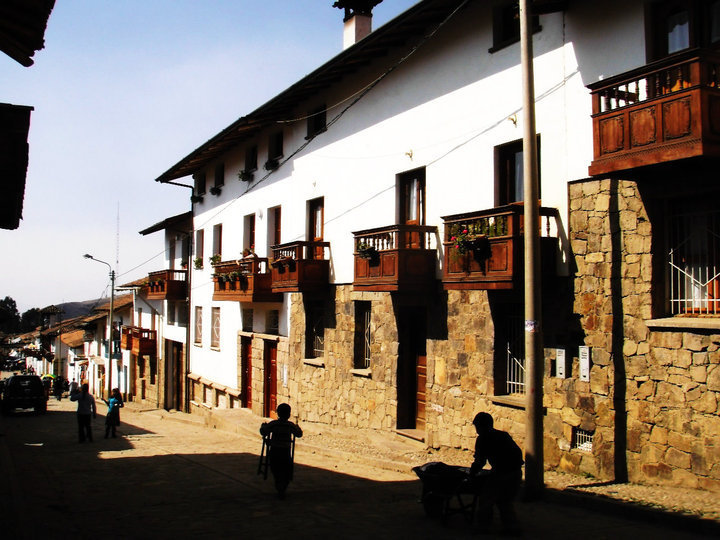
Lombard style Italian houses in Chacas, Ancash

After the collapse of guano exports, Peru's economy veered towards new sectors, such as industry, and even in this last case, the Italians were the protagonists. As an example, between 1880 and 1925, 45 of the total 106 industries founded in this period in Peru, were founded by Italians. A document of the time reported that: "In Lima, in Callao and in the departments of Libertad, Ica and Arequipa, the Italians own the majority of factories of wool and cotton yarn, shoes, wool and straw hats, liquor factories, cigarettes, chocolate, soap, furniture, water, beer, bread, pasta and biscuits, etc." In this context, some banks were born, including the "Banco Italiano" (1889), founded by the Italians.

In the 20th century the Ligurian emigration ended and there was a consistent arrival of Venetians and southerners, especially from Basilicata. In 1910 there were only 6,000 Italians, concentrated in Lima and its port Callao. After World War II there was a modest recovery of the influx of Italians to Peru, but in a small number if compared to that which went to other South American states (such as Venezuela and Argentina). The Italians numbered 3,774 in 1940, almost the same as in 1850. They grew to 5,716 in 1961, and decreased to just 4,062 in 1981. Given the high presence of Italians and therefore potential readers, many Italian-language newspapers were founded between 1880 and 1940, such as La Patria (1872–73), L'Italiano (1877–79), L'Araldo (1894-1895), O Balilla (1902) and La Voce d'Italia (1887-1943).

Currently, about 30,000 Italian citizens live in Peru, concentrated in the capital and other large cities. It is estimated that the descendants amount to about 500,000 people, corresponding to about 1.6% of the total population, the second largest community after the Spanish one. There are also a large number of Peruvian families with Italian surnames for which there are no documents officially proving the presence, in their family tree, of Italian ancestors.

== Italian Peruvian institutions and associations ==
- Asociación de descendientes de Italianos en el Perú
- Instituto Cultural Italo-Peruano
- Società Italiana d'IStruzione "Scuola Santa Margherita".
- Associazione Lombardi del Peru
- Associazione Liguri del Peru
- Associazione Siciliani del Peru
- Circolo Sportivo Italiano. Societta Canottieri "ITALIA"
- Circolo Tentrino di Lima
- Associazione Nazionale Alpini
- Associazione Piemontesi del Perú
- Associazione Toscana del Perú
- Associazione Sarda del Perú
- Associazione Veneti nel Mondo
- Camera di Comercio Italiana
- Societá Italiana di Beneficenza e Assistenza (SIBA)
- Asociación Italiana Peruana Monopoli-Bari "Regione Puglia".

== Education and press ==
The Italian Peruvians have in the Colegio Italiano Antonio Raimondi of Lima, founded in 1930, their major educational center, which also aims to spread the Italian language, and in the newspaper Il Messaggero Italo-peruviano their best informer in the Italian language. As for education, the first Italian-language school in Peru was founded in 1872, followed by many others.

== Cuisine ==
Given the strong presence of Italians of Ligurian ancestry in Peru, Peruvian cuisine has been influenced by Italian cuisine, especially Ligurian. Examples of Ligurian dishes commonly eaten in Peru are spaghetti with pesto sauce, torta pasqualina, and focaccia. According to the International Pasta Organisation, Peruvians are the fifth largest consumers of wheat pasta in the world.

== Notable Italian-Peruvians ==
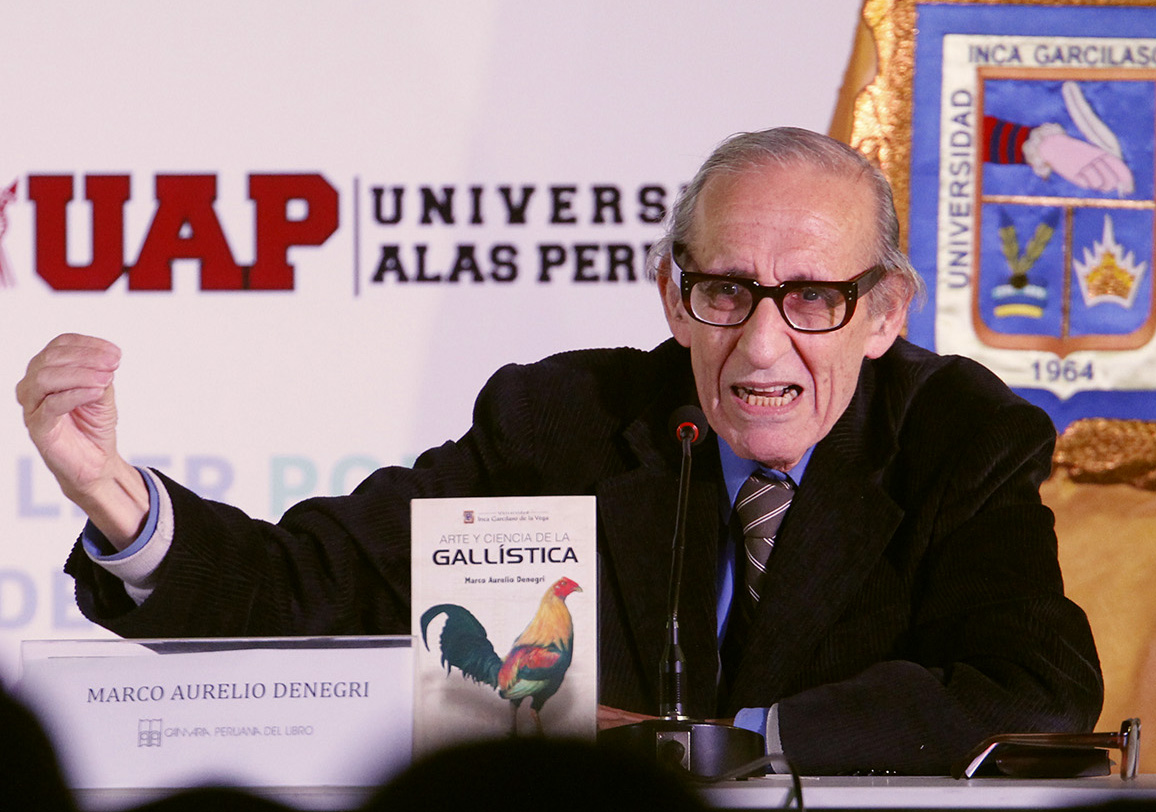
Marco Aurelio Denegri

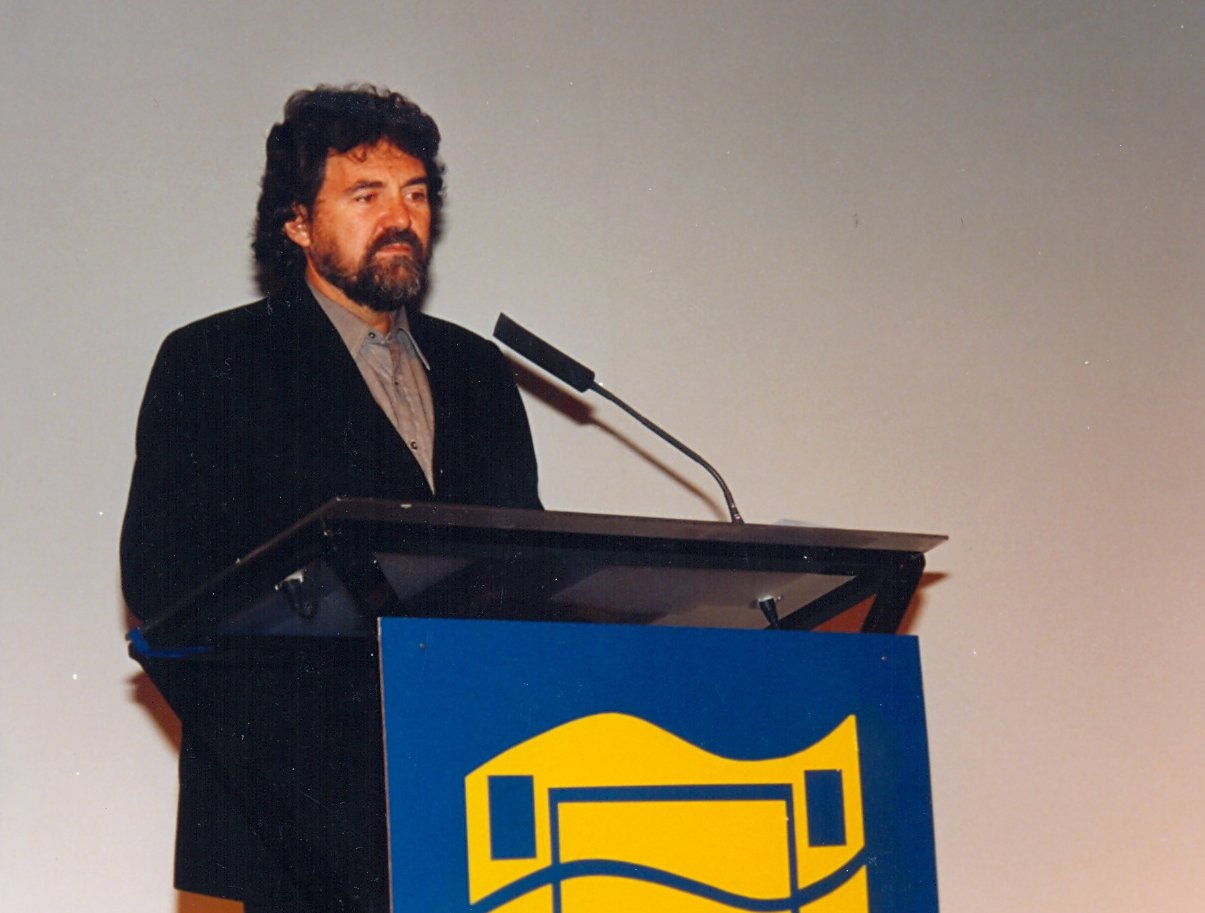
Francisco José Lombardi

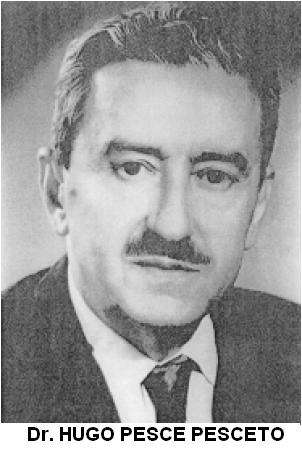
Hugo Pesce

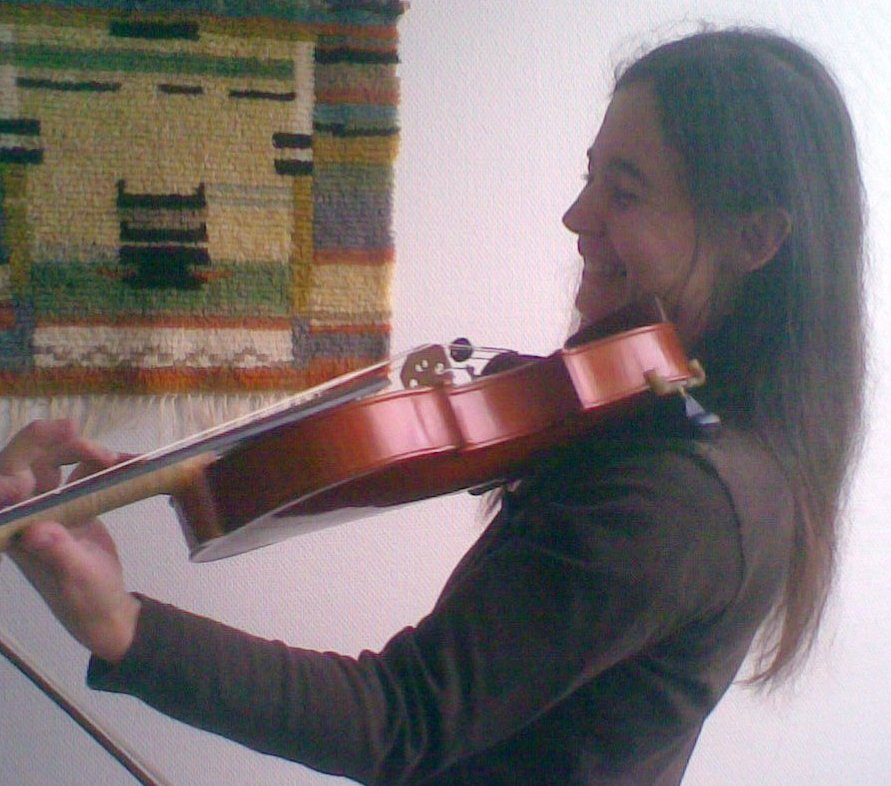
Clara Petrozzi

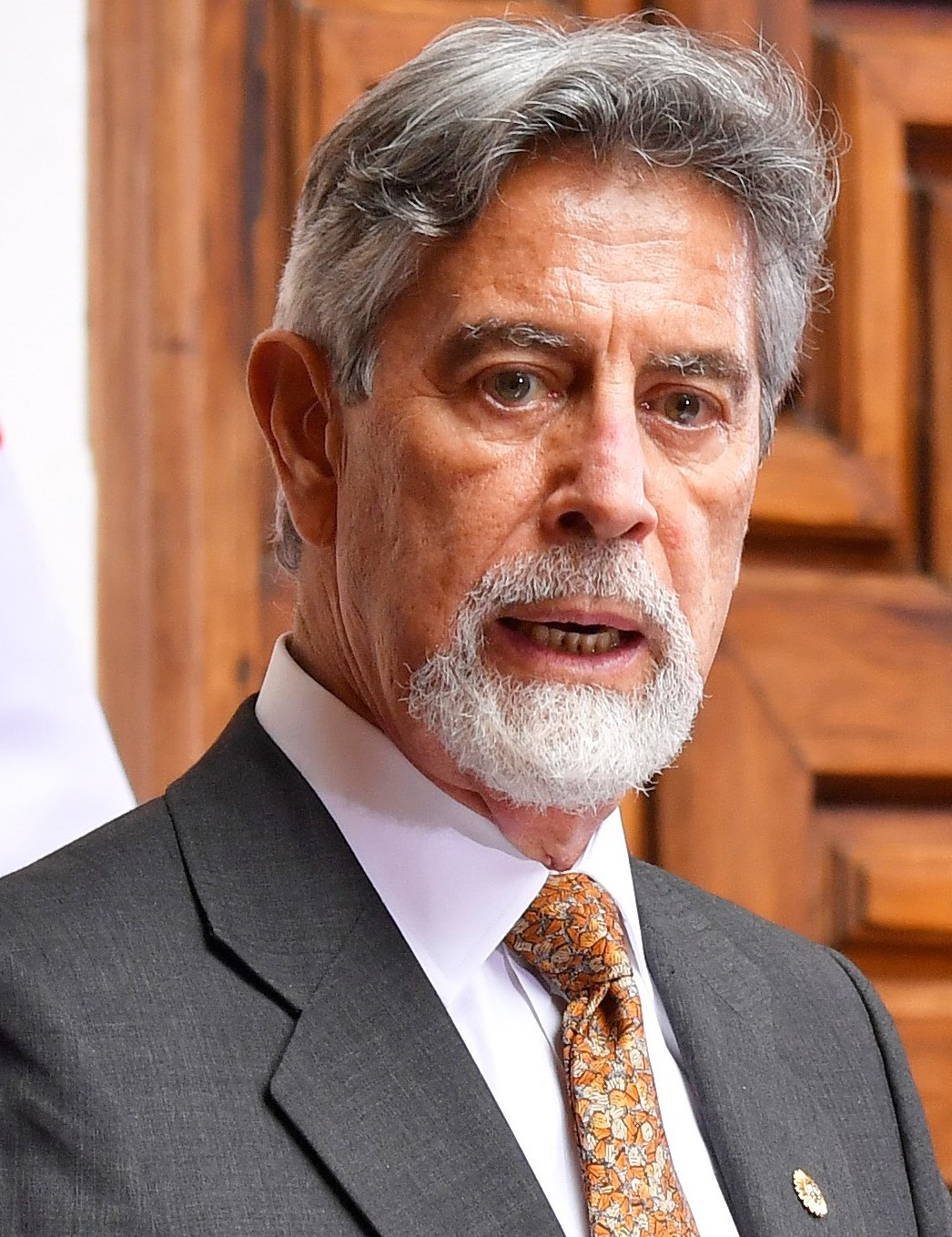
Francisco Sagasti, President of Peru from November 2020 to July 2021

- Cristina Aicardi, badminton player
- Maricarmen Alva, lawyer and politician
- Piero Alva, football striker
- Natale Amprimo, politician
- Ronald Baroni, footballer
- Francisco Bazán, footballer
- Ricardo Belmont, network owner and politician
- Diego Bertie, actor and singer
- Bernardo Bitti, priest and painter
- Francisco Bolognesi, military general
- Laura Bozzo, talk show hostess
- Enzo Ugo Fassioli, engineer
- Ana Maria Brescia Cafferata, billionaire heiress
- Pedro Brescia Cafferata, businessman
- Rosa Brescia Cafferata, billionaire heiress and philanthropist
- Mario Brescia Cafferata, billionaire businessman
- Leao Butrón, footballer
- Claudia Cagnina, footballer
- Raffaella Camet, volleyball player
- César Canevaro, general and politician
- Giancarlo Carmona, footballer
- Carlos Carrillo Parodi, medical microbiologist and professor
- Néstor Cerpa Cartolini, activist
- Mario Carulla, badminton player
- Luis Castañeda, politician
- Stephanie Cayo, actress, singer and songwriter
- Lyana Chirinos, footballer
- Juan Luis Cipriani Thorne, prelate
- Emmanuel Crescimbeni, swimmer
- Luisa María Cuculiza, politician
- Andrés F. Dasso, politician
- Marco Aurelio Denegri, intellectual, literary critic, television host and sexologist
- Gustavo Dulanto, footballer
- Anita Fernandini de Naranjo, heiress and politician
- Jean Ferrari, footballer
- Raúl Ferrero Rebagliati, politician
- Carlos Ferrero, politician
- Virna Flores, actress
- Alex Fort Brescia, businessman
- Pedro Gallese, footballer
- Luis Giampietri, politician
- Marisa Glave, sociologist and politician
- Juan González-Vigil, footballer
- Chabuca Granda, singer and composer
- Luis Horna, tennis player
- Antauro Humala, ethnocacerist
- Ollanta Humala, politician
- Fernando Iwasaki, writer and historian
- Saby Kamalich, actress
- Ismael La Rosa, actor
- Gianluca Lapadula, footballer
- Juan Lepiani, painter
- Claudia Llosa, film director, writer, producer, and author
- Francisco José Lombardi, film director, producer and screenwriter
- Guido Lombardi, journalist, lawyer, and politician
- Rafael López Aliaga, businessman and politician
- Flavio Maestri, football
- María Julia Mantilla, actress, dancer, model, teacher and beauty pageant titleholder
- Gian Marco, musician and actor
- Pilar Mazzetti, physician
- Alessandro Milesi, footballer
- Mauricio Montes, footballer
- Francisco Morales Bermúdez, politician and general
- Jesús Neyra, actor, model, dancer and footballer
- Piermaria Oddone, physicist
- Alberto Otárola, attorney and politician
- Giselle Patrón, model and actress
- Gabriela Pérez del Solar, volleyball player
- Hugo Pesce, physicist, activist, intellectual and philosopher
- Clara Petrozzi, violinist, violist, musicologist and composer
- Valeria Piazza, social communicator, model, and beauty pageant titleholder
- Walter Piazza, electric engineer, entrepreneur and politician
- Ana María Picasso, journalist and TV host
- Claudio Pizarro, footballer
- Santiago Queirolo, pisco producer
- Carlos Raffo, politician
- Miguel Rebosio, footballer
- Andrés Reggiardo, politician
- Renzo Reggiardo, politician
- José de la Riva Agüero, soldier, politician and historian
- Rafael Roncagliolo, sociologist, diplomat, and politician
- Santiago Roncagliolo, writer, screenwriter, translator and journalist
- Alessia Rovegno, model, singer and beauty pageant titleholder
- Francisco Sagasti, engineer, academic and politician
- Johanna San Miguel, actress, presenter and comedian
- Luis Solari, politician
- Mario Testino, fashion and portrait photographer
- Alfredo Tomassini, footballer
- Gian Carlo Vacchelli, sports commentator and politician
- Rodrigo Vilca, footballer
- Jaime Yzaga, tennis player
- Enrique Zileri, journalist and writer
- Marco Zunino, actor, singer, songwriter and dancer

== See also ==
- Italy–Peru relations
- Italian diaspora
- Immigration to Peru
