= Brescia (surname) =

Brescia or da Brescia is a surname derived from the city of Brescia in Italy. Notable people with the surname include:

- Alfonso Brescia (1930–2001), film director
- Domenico Brescia (1866–1939), composer
- Fortunato Brescia Tassano (d. 1951), Italian-born Peruvian businessman
- Georgia Brescia (born 1996), Italian tennis player
- Giovanni Antonio da Brescia, Italian painter
- Giovanni Maria da Brescia, Italian painter
- Jason Michael Brescia (born 1986), American comedy writer-director
- Justin Brescia (born 1982), American actor
- Leonardo Brescia (1520–1582), Italian painter
- Lisa Brescia (born 1970), American actress
- Mario Brescia Cafferata (1929–2013), Peruvian billionaire businessman
- Moretto da Brescia (c. 1498–1554), Italian painter
- Pedro Brescia Cafferata (1921–2014), Peruvian businessman
- Rosa Brescia Cafferata (born c. 1926), Peruvian billionaire heiress and philanthropist
