= Cafferata =

Cafferata is a surname. Notable people with the surname include:

- Ana Maria Brescia Cafferata (born c. 1924), Peruvian billionaire heiress
- Francisco Cafferata (1861–1890), Argentine sculptor
- Gerónimo Cafferata Marazzi (1929–1986), Peruvian naval officer
- Hector A. Cafferata Jr. (1929–2016), American Marine and Medal of Honor recipient
- Juan Manuel Cafferata (1852–1920), Argentine politician
- Mario Brescia Cafferata (1929–2013), Peruvian billionaire businessman
- Patricia Dillon Cafferata (born 1940), American politician
- Pedro Brescia Cafferata (1921–2014), Peruvian businessman
- Raymond Cafferata (1897–1966), British Police Officer, see 1929 Hebron massacre
- Rosa Brescia Cafferata (born c. 1926), Peruvian billionaire heiress and philanthropist

== See also ==
- Cafferatta, Santa Fe, town (comuna) in center-east Argentina
