= List of cities with the largest Italian-descended populations =

List of cities by Italian-descended population

List of cities with the largest Italian-descended populations is a list of cities and metropolitan areas with significant populations of people of Italian descent. Figures may refer to ancestry, ethnic origin, birthplace, citizenship, or self-identification, depending on the source used.

== List ==
Rank	City	Country	Estimated Italian-descended population	Notes
1	São Paulo	Brazil	6,000,000+	São Paulo is widely reported as having one of the largest Italian-descended populations outside Italy, with estimates ranging from 5–6 million people of full or partial Italian ancestry in the city or metropolitan area.
2	Buenos Aires	Argentina	4,000,000+	Italian immigration had a major influence on Buenos Aires and Argentina more broadly. Estimates often state that a large share of Argentina's population has some Italian ancestry.
3	Rome	Italy	2,700,000+	Italy's capital and largest city. The estimate approximates the city's resident population, as the overwhelming majority of residents are ethnically Italian.
4	New York City	United States	2,600,000+	The New York metropolitan area has one of the largest Italian-American populations in the United States. A 2000 New York City planning map recorded nearly 693,000 people reporting Italian ancestry within New York City itself.
5	Lima	Peru	1,500,000+	Italian Peruvians have historically been concentrated in Lima and Callao. Estimates vary, and city-level figures are often based on broader national or regional estimates.
6	Milan	Italy	1,350,000+	Italy's second-largest city. The estimate approximates the city's resident population, as the overwhelming majority of residents are ethnically Italian.
7	Naples	Italy	900,000+	One of Italy's largest cities and the historic center of southern Italy.
8	Turin	Italy	850,000+	One of northern Italy's principal cities and an important center of Italian industry.
9	Palermo	Italy	630,000+	Largest city in Sicily and one of Italy's major urban centers.
10	Genoa	Italy	550,000+	Historic port city and the capital of Liguria.
11	Chicago	United States	500,000+	Chicago has a historic Italian-American community. The metropolitan area contains one of the largest Italian-descended populations in the United States.
12	Toronto	Canada	468,970	The Greater Toronto Area had 468,970 residents reporting Italian ancestry in the 2021 Canadian census.
13	Bologna	Italy	390,000+	Historic capital of the Emilia-Romagna region. Estimate approximates the city's resident population.
14	Florence	Italy	360,000+	Capital of Tuscany and one of Italy's principal cultural centers.
15	Bari	Italy	315,000+	Largest city in Apulia and an important port on the Adriatic Sea.
16	Montreal	Canada	300,000+	Quebec has one of Canada's largest Italian-origin populations, with the Montreal area historically serving as the main center of Italian settlement in the province.
17	Rosario	Argentina	300,000+	Rosario received significant Italian immigration, and Italian descendants are commonly described as forming a large share of the city's population.
18	Melbourne	Australia	279,112	Melbourne is one of Australia's major centers of Italian ancestry. In 2021, 6.6% of Greater Melbourne residents reported Italian ancestry.
19	Montevideo	Uruguay	200,000+	Uruguay has one of the highest proportions of people of Italian descent outside Italy, and Italian settlement was historically concentrated in Montevideo.

== See also ==
- Italian diaspora
- Italian Brazilians
- Italian Argentines
- Italian Americans
- Italian Canadians
- Italian Australians
- Italian Peruvians
- Italian Uruguayans
