= Torre BBVA (Buenos Aires) =

Skyscraper in Buenos Aires

BBVA Tower
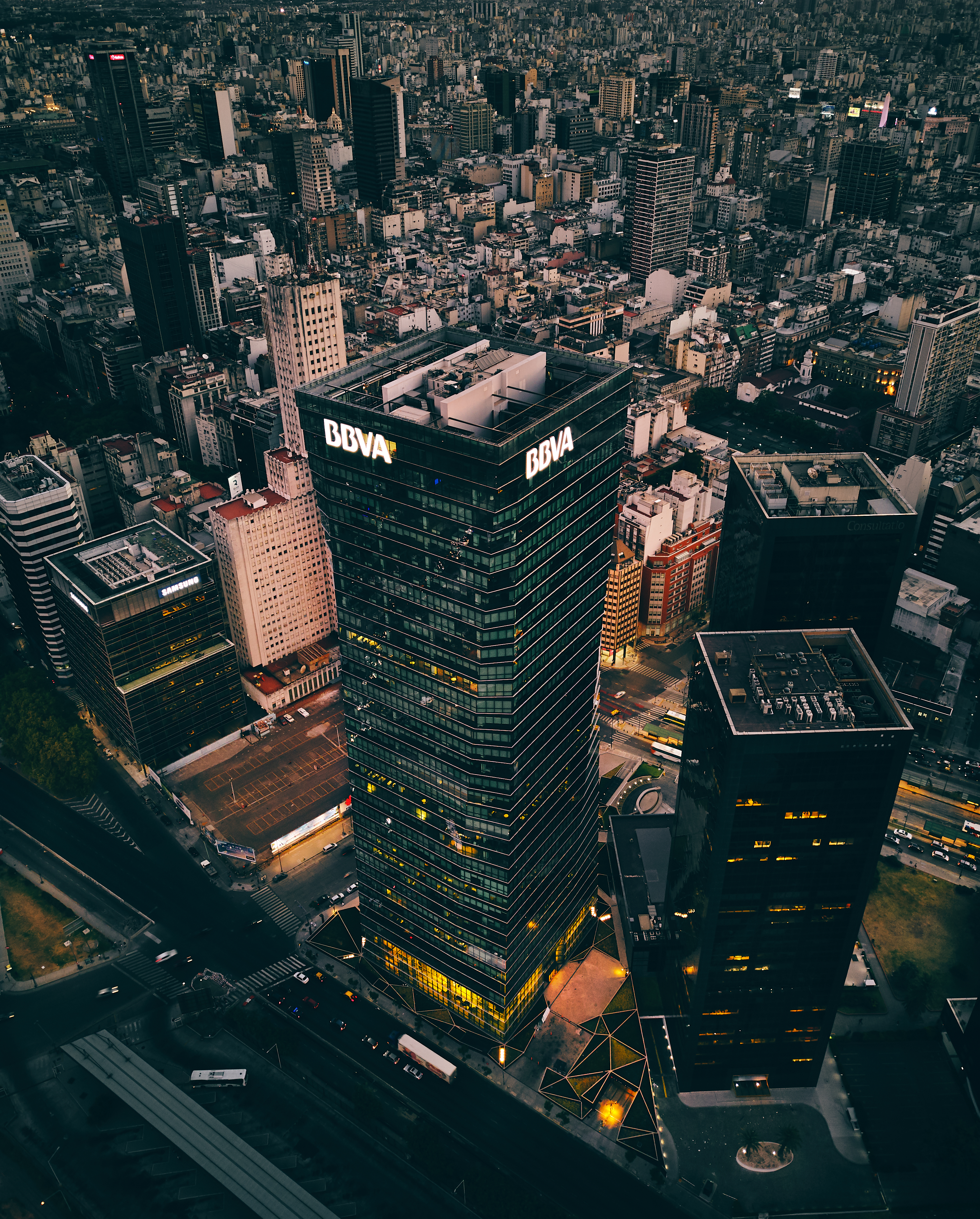
- Interactive map of the BBVA Tower area

General information
- Status: Completed
- Type: Office
- Location: Buenos Aires, Argentina, Avenida Eduardo Madero 802 C1106ACV, C1106 Buenos Aires
- Coordinates: 34.59790°S 58.37013°W
- Construction started: 2013
- Completed: 2016
- Cost: $250,000,000
- Owner: BBVA Argentina

Height
- Roof: 155 m (509 ft)

Technical details
- Structural system: Concrete
- Floor count: 33 (+3 underground)
- Floor area: 77,295 m^{2} (832,000 sq ft)
- Lifts/elevators: 18

Design and construction
- Architects: Arquitectonica (Bernardo Fort Brescia) & BMA Arquitectos

The BBVA Tower (also known as the Banco Francés Tower) is an office skyscraper in Buenos Aires, Argentina, currently serving as the headquarters of BBVA Argentina financial institution. Completed between 2013 and 2016, the building stands at 155 m (509 ft) tall with 33 floors and is the eleventh tallest building in Buenos Aires.

== History ==
=== Location ===
The tower is located in the Retiro neighborhood of the financial center and business complex of Catalinas Norte, between the Avenida Córdoba and Avenida Leandro N. Alem boulevards. It is cornered by teo lower-rise towers, the Alem Plaza and the Torre Catalinas Plaza.

=== Architecture ===
The building has a total of 77,295 m^{2} (832,000 sq ft) usable space, from which 1,600 m^{2} (17,200 sq ft) are distributed to each floor. The tower presents a "twisted" volumetry which shapeshifts edges. The entire project was led by Arquitectonica studio of Peruvian architect Bernardo Fort Brescia alongside Argentinian firm BMA Arquitectos. As it rises, the building pivots with a subtle rotation, and its prismatic corners spiral and twist like an unfolded deck of cards, creating sculptural effects along the edges and catching light and reflections from neighbouring buildings. These widening facets change shape and character as the pedestrian passes around the base. The building has a flooring top finish of moquette, porcelain stoneware, linoleum PVC and encapsulated panels and calcium sulphate by dimensions of 600x600mm.

The building received its LEED Gold Certificate in 2017.

The offices have a centralized printing system, which allows for a cleaner work environment and improved air quality, while achieving savings in energy and paper. The building has one of the highest sustainability standards in the region thanks to the use of natural resources. It also uses rainwater for drip irrigation, there are water collectors on the terrace to supply the showers with hot water and it even has a control system that regulates the lighting based on natural light. In addition, it is a cardioprotected building, as it has defibrillators and all staff are trained in CPR and AED maneuvers in case of emergencies. For this project, various solutions were used that offer General Electric silicone technologies for the manufacture and installation of high-performance glass facades.

=== Concept ===
The building is part of a project in which owner BBVA Argentina aimed to bring together their filiales from Madrid, Mexico City, Houston, London, Santiago de Chile and Lima by their technological platforms, the organization and the corporate culture. The result is a new model of a bank depending on technology and digital transformation.

== See also ==
- List of tallest buildings in Argentina
- List of tallest buildings in Buenos Aires
- List of tallest buildings in South America

== Gallery ==
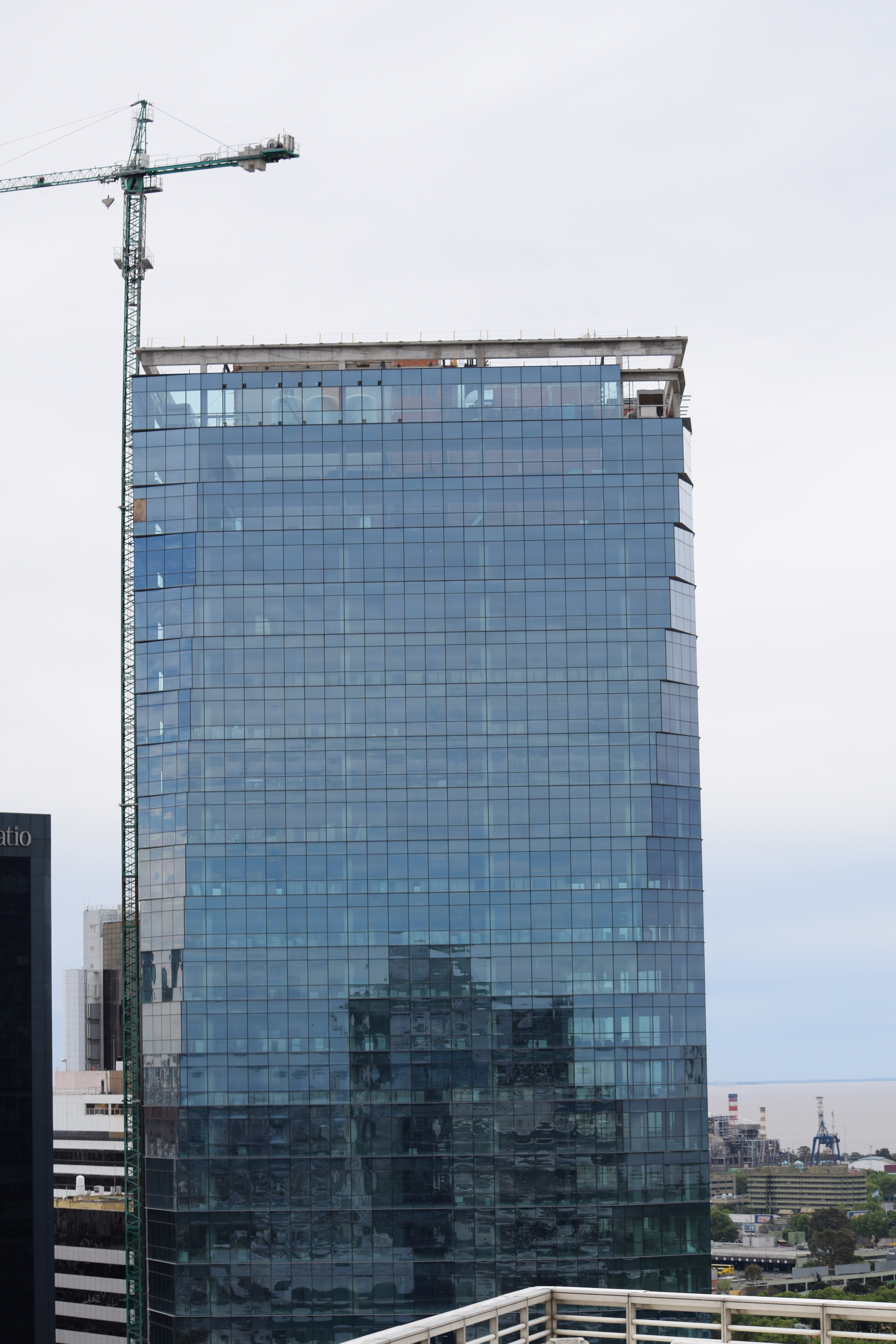
The tower under construction in November 2015

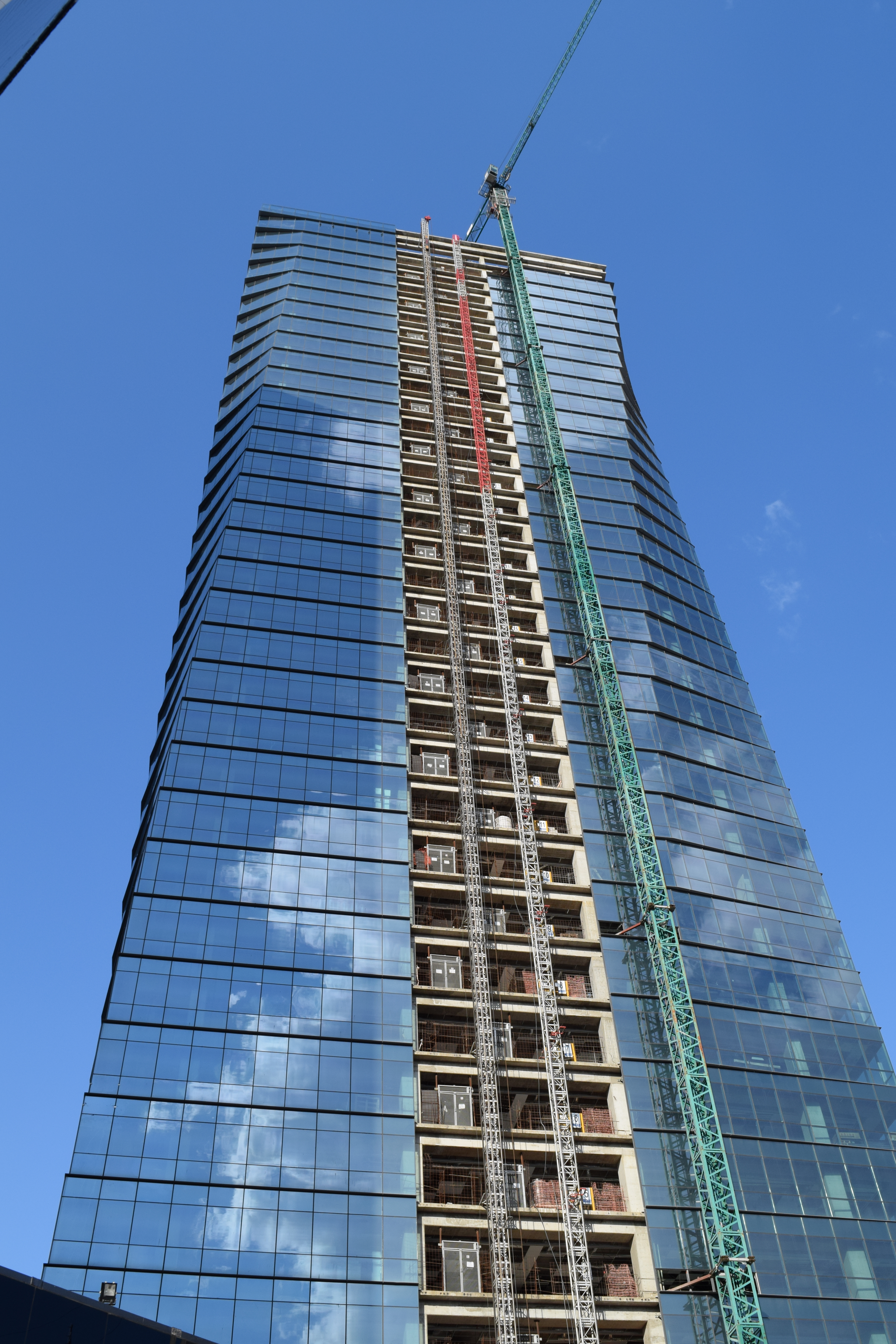
The tower under construction in 2016
