= 300 Grove Bay Residences =

- Interactive map of the 300 Grove Bay Residences area

General information
- Status: Never built
- Location: Coconut Grove, Miami, FL, USA, 3663 South Miami Avenue
- Coordinates: 25.74306°N 80.21666°W
- Construction started: 2008 (initial proposal)
- Completed: 2010 (initial proposal)

Height
- Height: Tower I: 411 feet (125 m); Tower II: 368 feet (112 m); Tower II: 304 feet (93 m)

Technical details
- Floor count: Tower I: 37; Tower II: 32; Tower II: 27

Design and construction
- Architecture firm: Arquitectonica

300 Grove Bay Residences was a proposed residential development to be located in the Coconut Grove neighborhood of Miami, Florida. The complex was to consist of 3 high-rise buildings, with all three rising at least 300 feet (91 m). Each building in the complex was designed by the Arquitectonica architectural firm and was being jointly developed by Ocean Land Investments and The Related Group of Florida. The towers were originally approved for construction in September 2007 and were expected to be completed by 2010. In May 2008, however, the Miami-Dade Circuit Court nullified the project's approval on grounds of procedural violations and spot zoning. Since its approval was nullified in 2008, the project has neither begun construction nor undergone a redesign, and it is no longer considered an active development.

== Approval controversy ==
The city of Miami approved the construction of 300 Grove Bay Residences in September 2007. This approval was controversial, as opponents of the project argued that the city did not provide them with due legal process to contest the planned development and had thus committed procedural violations. In late 2007, various parties, including the Vizcaya Museum and Gardens and individual Coconut Grove residents, sued the city to block the development's construction. The Vizcaya Museum argued that the approved development would block scenic oceanfront views from the Villa Vizcaya, while local residents felt that the large, high-rise development would be out-of-place in the more suburban Coconut Grove region of Miami.

In May 2008, the Miami-Dade Circuit Court appellate panel nullified the city of Miami's previous approval of the project, citing both procedural violations and noting the "spot zoning" of the three skyscrapers as out of character with the neighborhood. Despite this setback, Ocean Land Investments continues to label the project as an "active proposal." Due to the court's nullification on grounds of spot zoning, the project would likely need to be downsized significantly before seeking re-approval from the city.

== High-rises in the development ==
Name	Height ft (m)	Floors	Status	References
300 Grove Bay Tower 1	411 (125)	37	Stale proposal	
300 Grove Bay Tower 2	368 (112)	32	Stale proposal	
300 Grove Bay Tower 3	304 (93)	27	Stale proposal	

== See also ==
- List of tallest buildings in Miami
