= Brescia (disambiguation) =

Brescia is a city in Italy.

Brescia may also refer to:

- Brescia (surname)

Italy

- Province of Brescia
- Brescia Calcio, a football club
- AN Brescia, a water-sports club
- University of Brescia
- Brescia Arsenal, a small arms factory

North America

- Brescia University, in Owensboro, Kentucky, U.S.
- Brescia University College, in London, Ontario, Canada
