= Torre BBVA =

Torre BBVA may refer to:

- Castellana 81, Spain
  - Banco Bilbao Vizcaya (building), the original building
- Torre BBVA (Buenos Aires)
- Torre BBVA México
