= Casa Marsano =

Former building in Lima, Peru

- Casona Marsano, Palacio Marsano
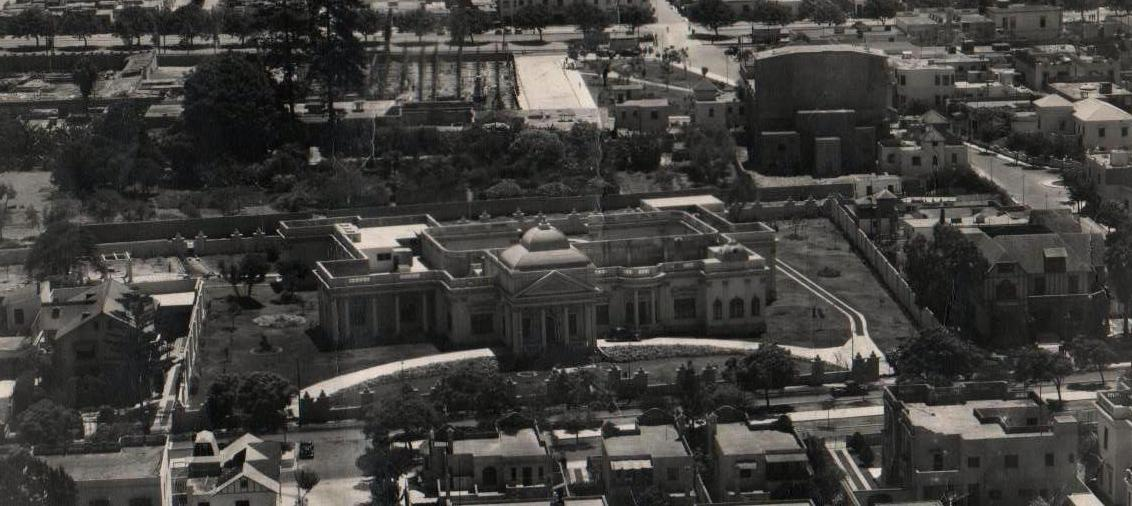
- The building in 1946
- Interactive map of the Casa Marsano area

General information
- Architectural style: French-inspired
- Location: Miraflores District, Lima, Av. Arequipa 50
- Construction stopped: 1941
- Inaugurated: 1941
- Demolished: 2002
- Owner: Tomás Marsano; Perú Real State

The Casa Marsano, also known as the Marsano Palace (Spanish: Palacio Marsano), was a palace in Miraflores District, Lima.

== History ==
The site of the building was located in Miraflores, a district of Lima which had been affected by the War of the Pacific. By the late 19th century and early 20th century, the district began to grow, as immigrants, notably of italian origin, began to populate the district.

The building was built to celebrate the 50th anniversary of the marriage between Tomás Marsano, son of a Genoese father, and Clotilde Campodónico Crovetto, herself born in Genoa, who married in Lima on December 2, 1894. The house was inaugurated in 1941, the same year it finished construction.

On March 17, 1988, the palace hosted a heavy metal music concert headed by local bands Orgus, Sacra and Masacre.

=== Demolition ===
The building was not declared as a historical monument by the National Institute of Culture, as then director César Coloma opposed its inscription due to modernity of the building and due to it not being of a "Peruvian [architectural] style" and, consequently, it "did not contribute to local architecture." It was controversially demolished in 2002 and its hacienda was replaced by the Compu Palace shopping centre and the Marsano Theatre (March 1928) and Building (after 1944; officially known as the Residencial Miranda).

== See also ==
- Edificio Limatambo, another well-known building whose demolition was also met with controversy
