= Alex Fort Brescia =

Peruvian businessman

- Born: Alex Paul Gaston Fort Brescia
- Education: Williams College; Columbia Business School
- Occupation: Businessman
- Parent(s): Rosa Brescia Cafferata; Paul Fort
- Relatives: Fortunato Brescia Tassano (grandfather); Mario Brescia Cafferata (uncle); Pedro Brescia Cafferata (uncle); Ana Maria Brescia Cafferata (aunt); Laurinda Hope Spear (sister-in-law)

Alex Fort Brescia (October 16, 1957, in Lima, Peru) is a Peruvian businessman. He is the co-chairman of Grupo Breca, a family conglomerate, and BBVA Continental, a Peruvian bank.

== Biography ==
Alex Fort Brescia was born into the billionaire Brescia family. His Italian-born grandfather, Fortunato Brescia Tassano, founded Grupo Breca, a real estate company-turned-conglomerate. His mother, Rosa Brescia Cafferata, is a billionaire heiress. His brother, Bernardo Fort Brescia, is an architect.

Fort Brescia graduated from Williams College and earned a master in business administration from the Columbia Business School.

Fort Brescia is the co-chairman of Grupo Breca, his family conglomerate, since 2016. He is also the chairman of BBVA Continental, a Peruvian bank. Additionally, he is the chairman of the insurance company Rímac Seguros, as well as B1 Capital Partners and Melon. He serves on the boards of directors of Tasa, Minsur, Intursa, CPPQ, Exsa and Urbanova.

Additionally, he is a member of the Board of Directors of APORTA, a social impact entity of Grupo Breca.
