= Edificio Limatambo =

Former building in Lima, Peru

Limatambo Building
- Edificio Seoane, Edificio Coca-Cola
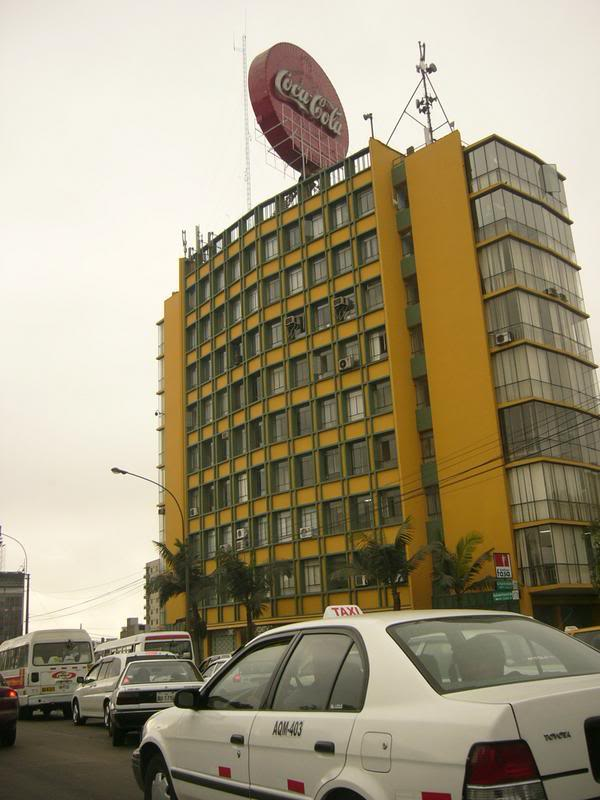
- The building in 2007
- Interactive map of the Limatambo Building area

General information
- Architectural style: Modern
- Location: San Isidro District

The Limatambo Building (Spanish: Edificio Limatambo), also known as the Seoane Building (Spanish: Edificio Seoane), was a building in San Isidro District, Lima. The building was known for its billboards, most of which promoted the Coca-Cola Company.

It was demolished in 2013 to make way for the planned Rímac Tower (Spanish: Torre Rímac) on its former site. The building was promoted as the country's first skyscraper, but was never built.

== History ==
The building was built in the 1950s, was built between 1953 and 1954 at the intersection of Javier Prado and Paseo de la República avenues, near what was then the Limatambo International Airport. The project was signed by the Peruvian architect Enrique Seoane Ros, commissioned by the Brescia family. One of its first billboards promoted Panagra, which operated in the aforementioned airport.

The most well-known billboards of the building were those of the Coca-Cola Company, which illuminated the building at nighttime, and led to it also being nicknamed the "Coca-Cola Building" by locals.

=== Demolition ===
The building's demolition was announced in 2012, as the planned 55-floor Rímac Tower was to occupy the area instead, becoming the country's tallest building at a 208-meter height. The announcement was met with opposition from the general public, with construction professionals and journalists appealing to the Ministry of Culture to stop the building's demolition, some of which compared the situation to that of the Casa Marsano.

Despite the controversy, the building was ultimately demolished on the latter half of 2013. Construction on the new Rímac Tower was meant to start in 2016 and end before 2020. Despite its announcement, was never built.

== Overview ==
The building was a united set of three blocks with different heights. The block facing Javier Prado Avenue had nine floors and two apartments per floor, while the rear one had seven levels and one apartment per floor. The top two floors of the tallest block contained duplex-type apartments.

== Gallery ==
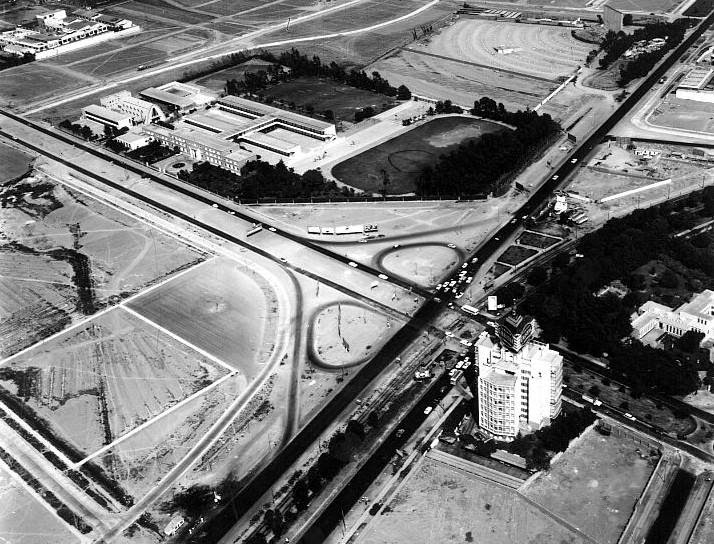
The building (right) and San Agustín School (left) in the 1960s.

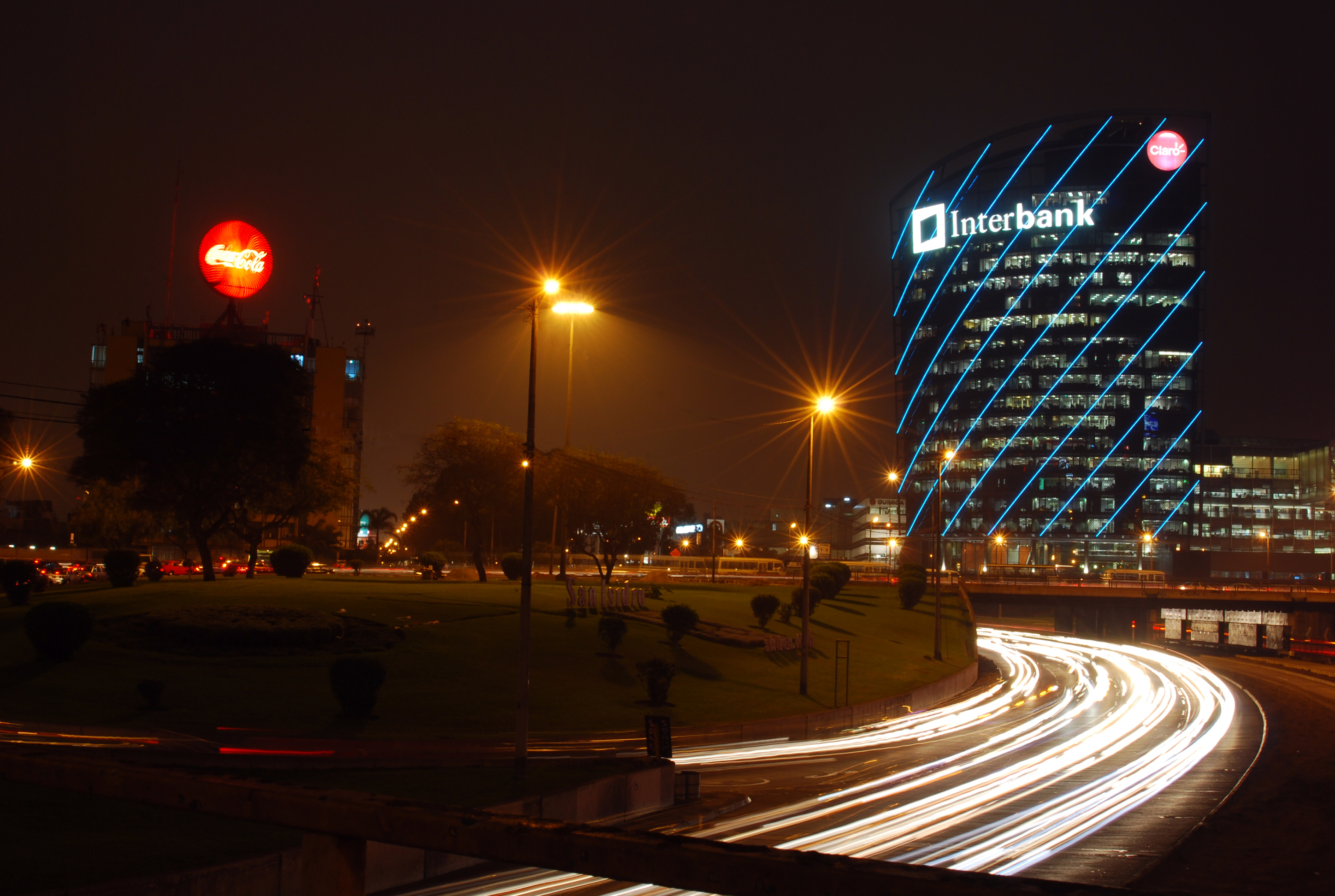
Nighttime view of Limatambo and Interbank buildings

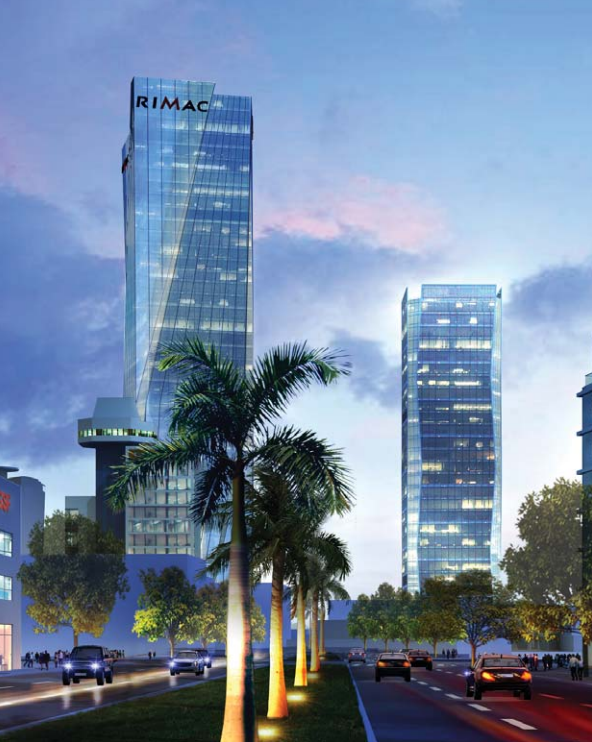
Render of the Torre Rímac.

== See also ==
- Casa Marsano, another well-known building whose demolition was also met with controversy
