= BBVA Perú =

Peruvian bank

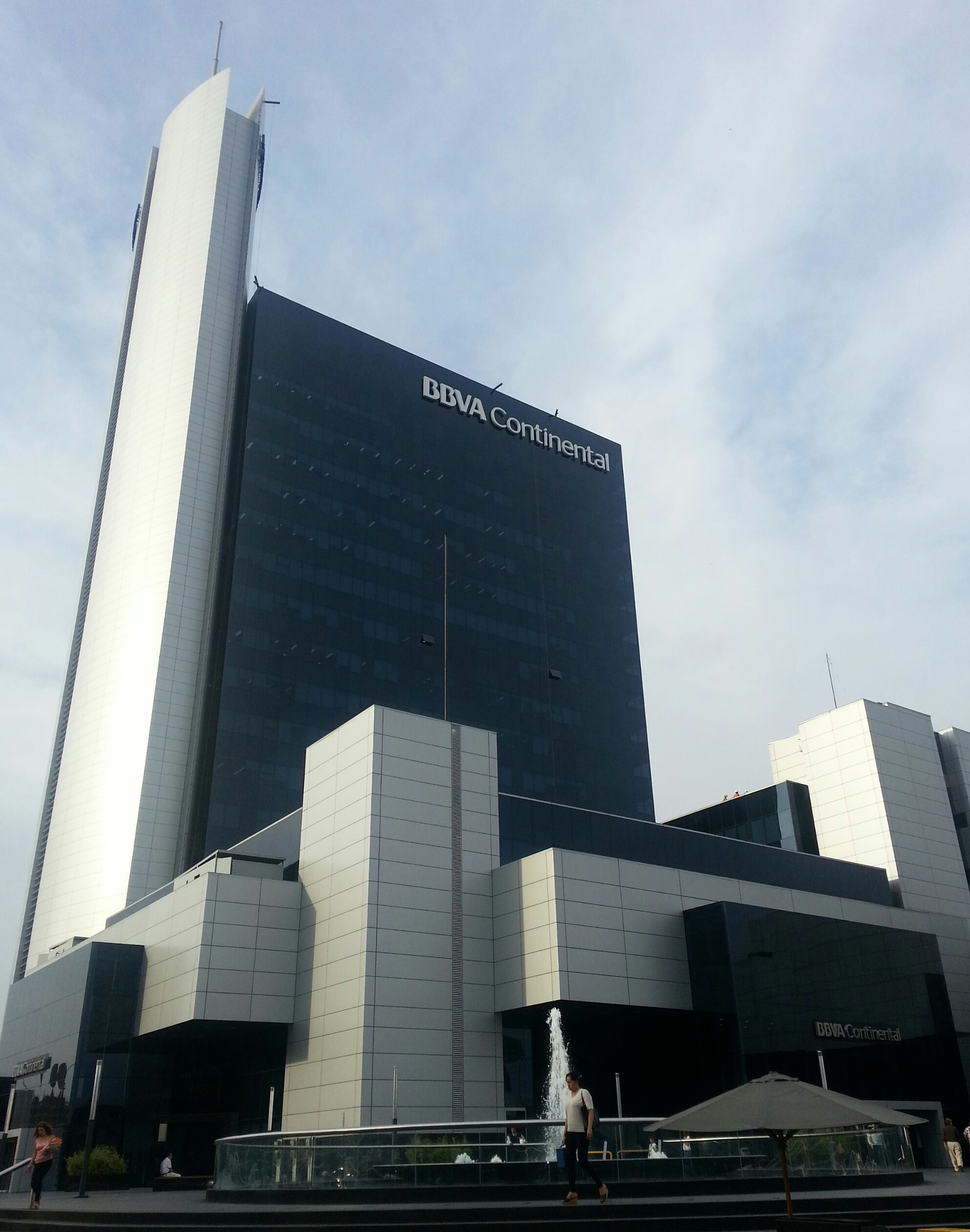
- Headquarters in Lima
- Type: Subsidiary
- Traded as: BVL: CONTINC1
- Industry: Finance
- Founded: 1951; 75 years ago
- Headquarters: Av. República de Panamá No. 3055, San Isidro District, Peru
- Key people: Alex Fort Brescia, (Chairman); Fernando Eguiluz (CEO)
- Products: Financial services
- Net income: US$ 500.1 Million (2023)
- Total assets: US$ 282 Million (2023)
- Owner: BBVA
- Number of employees: 7,266 (2023)

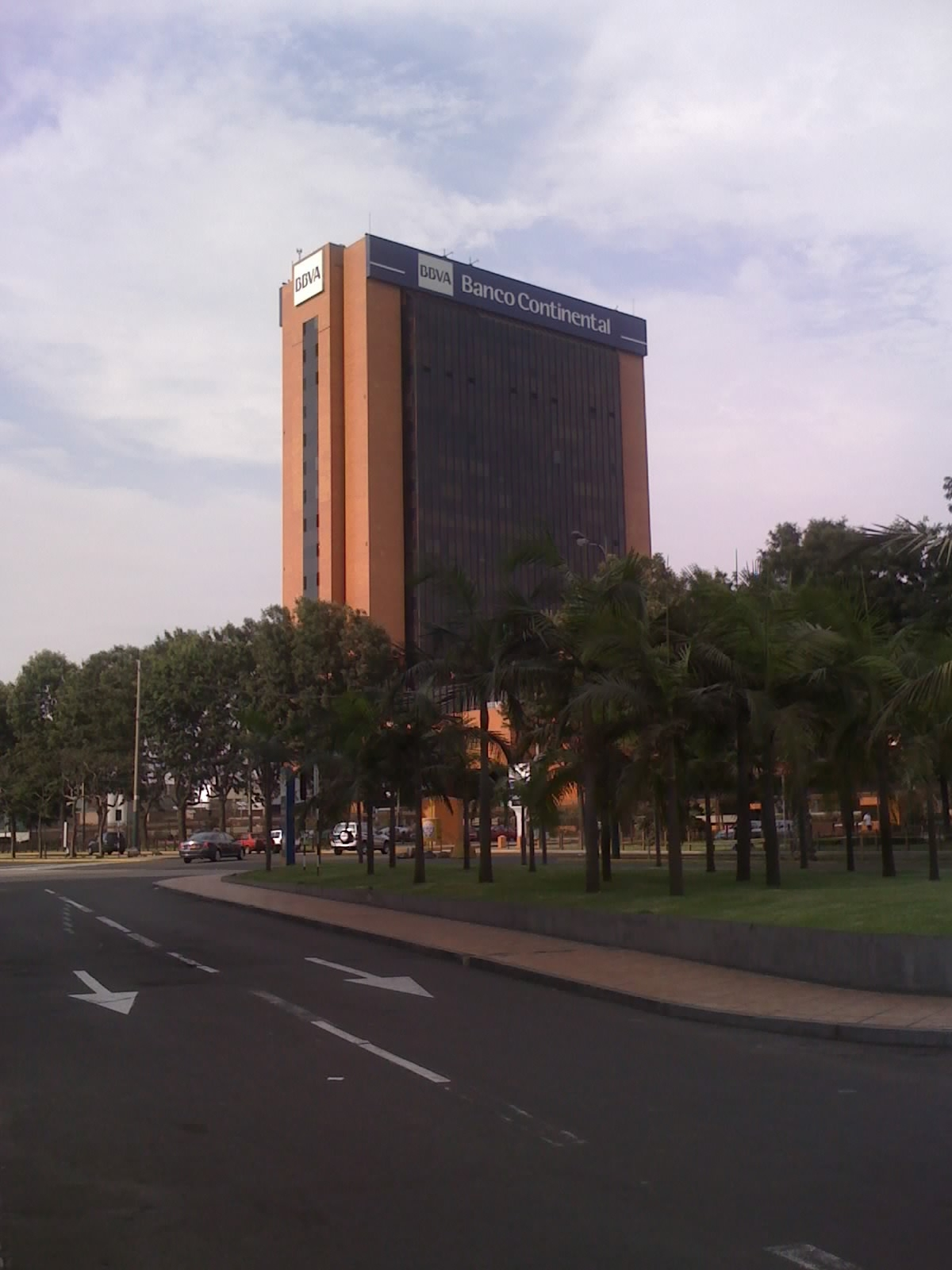
Old BBVA Banco Continental headquarters in Lima.

BBVA Perú (formerly BBVA Banco Continental) is a Peruvian bank and subsidiary of Holding Continental (an affiliate of BBVA) which holds 92.08% of its equity.

== History ==
The bank was established in 1951, and its operations are authorized by the Superintendencia de Banca, Seguros y AFP (SBS).

BBVA Continental is the result of the merger of Banco Continental with Banco Bilbao Vizcaya and Grupo Breca in 1995.

Recent historical research has emphasised that the success of BBVA’s expansion in Latin America depended not only on acquisitions but also on the integration of management practices and implementation of information technology across the region.

In June 2011, the Fitch credit rating agency raised BBVA Continental's investment grade from BBB to A−.

In 2014, Global Finance ranked BBVA Continental the "Best Bank in Peru."

On June 10, 2019, BBVA unifies its brand worldwide and BBVA Continental is renamed BBVA.

In July 2019, Fernando Eguiluz becomes CEO of BBVA Perú.

The bank conducts its business through 311 branches located in different regions of Peru. As of 2023, it had 7,266 employees.

== See also ==
- BBVA in Mexico
- BBVA in Argentina
- BBVA Provincial
- BBVA in the United States
