= Ana Maria Brescia Cafferata =

Peruvian billionaire heiress

- Born: c. 1924
- Occupation: Investor
- Known for: Holding a 30% stake in Grupo Breca
- Parent(s): Fortunato Brescia Tassano; María Catalina Cafferata Peñaranda
- Relatives: Mario Brescia Cafferata (brother); Pedro Brescia Cafferata (brother); Rosa Brescia Cafferata (sister); Alex Fort Brescia (nephew); Bernardo Fort Brescia (nephew)

Ana Maria Brescia Cafferata (born c. 1924) is a Peruvian billionaire heiress. She owns 30% of Grupo Breca, a conglomerate founded by her Italian-born father. Her stakes in the group were previously managed by her brothers, Mario and Pedro, before dying in 2013 and 2014, respectively. She currently is one of Peru's richest people and the second richest woman in that country (just behind Anne Marie See Pastor, member of the Pastor family). She never married and never had any children.
