= Marco Aurelio Denegri =

Peruvian linguist, journalist, television host and sexologist

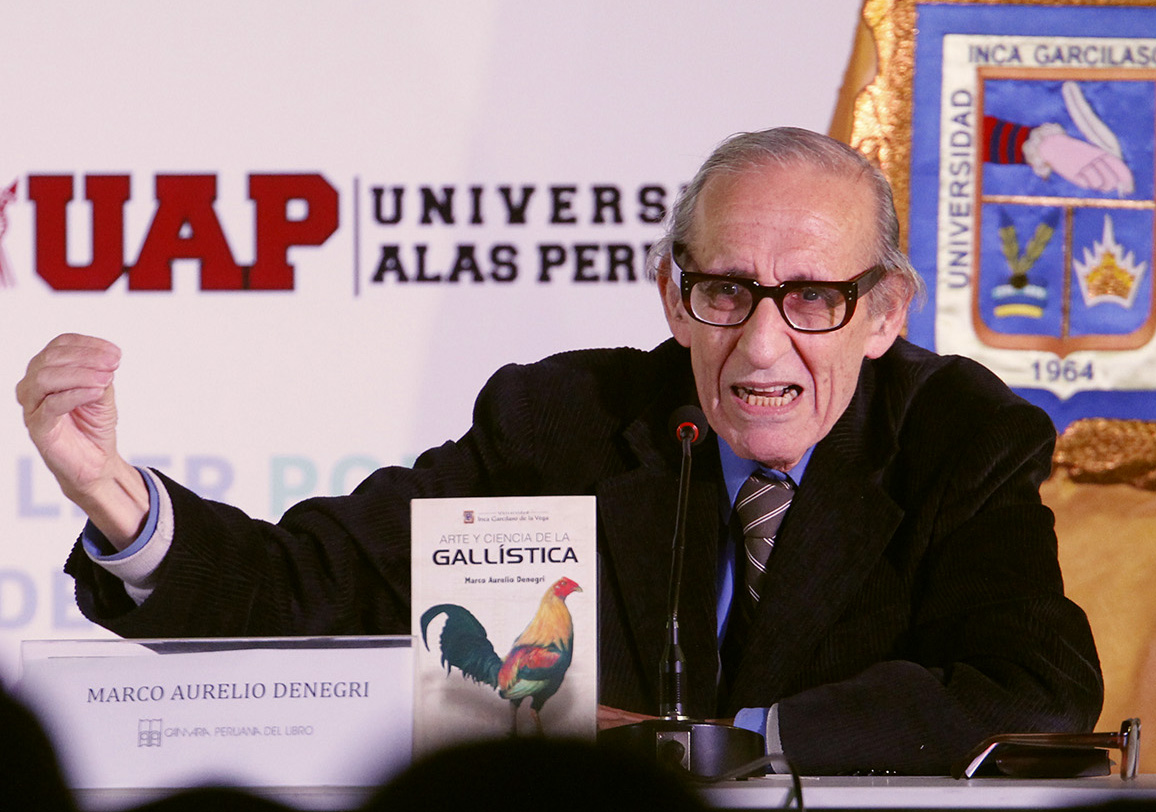
- Denegri in 2015
- Born: Marco Aurelio Denegri Santa Gadea; 16 May 1938; Lima, Peru
- Died: 27 July 2018 (aged 80); Lima, Peru
- Education: Colegio San Andrés; Universidad Nacional Mayor de San Marcos
- Occupations: Writer, literary critic, television presenter, sexologist
- Parents: Julio Ernesto Denegri Cornejo (father); Leonor Santa Gadea Arana (mother)

Marco Aurelio Denegri Santa Gadea (16 May 1938 – 27 July 2018) was a Peruvian intellectual, literary critic, television host and sexologist.

== Early life and education ==
His father was Julio Ernesto Denegri Cornejo (his great grandfather was Marco Aurelio Denegri Valega), and his mother was Leonor Santa Gadea Arana. He attended Colegio San Andrés (formerly Colegio Anglo-Peruano). He later studied law at Universidad Nacional Mayor de San Marcos, and then Sexology and Sociology. He said that he attended several universities; however, he considered himself a "self-taught polymath".

== Career ==
During the 1970s, Denegri was the editor of Revista Científica y Artística de Cultural Sexual – Fáscinum. Its first issue was published in April 1972.

His career in Peruvian television began in 1973. From 1997 to 2000 he hosted A solas con Marco Aurelio Denegri on Cable Magico Cultural. He resigned in 2000 and then moved to TV Peru-, thanks to the aid of José Watanabe, and there he hosted a television program called La función de la palabra, where he addressed various aspects of culture-from music to the beauty of the hands-although he considered it counter-cultural.

He wrote articles for various Peruvian newspapers, which have been published in "De esto y de aquello" by Ricardo Palma University. He wrote a weekly column for El Comercio.

== Personal life ==
Denegri never married and was very reserved regarding his private life. In some programs he expressed being friends with some intellectuals, although during the last years of his life he became totally isolated. His main link to the world was his assistant and maid Rosa Torres; anyone interested in speaking to Denegri had to ring her cellphone to request a telephone conversation with Denegri. After Denegri gave her permission, she connected the phone line and the person in question could communicate directly with him.

During his youth he frequently visited Jirón Huatica in Lima, a meeting place for prostitutes and their clients. In "Miscelánea humanística" he drew a map of the location as he knew it.

He was also a witness to peculiar sexual encounters. In one of the airings of "La función de la palabra", he said that together with a group of people he witnessed a technical intercourse session which involved great endurance in resisting the urge to ejaculate. Denegri related that he saw a male prostitute enduring 45 minutes of passive oral sex without ejaculating. Furthermore, in an interview conducted by journalist Raúl Tola, Denegri said that he attended an ejaculation contest which consisted in ejaculating up to the farthest distance. Amused by his story, Tola asked him where could one find such contests, to which Denegri only replied that several such contests exist.

He was an audiophile and music lover and a Peruvian cajón lover; for this reason he introduced the term cajonística to refer to the art of African-Peruvian cajón playing.

On December 10, 2025, the Universidad Nacional Mayor de San Marcos received a donation of 3,900 books and magazines belonging to Denegri.

== Death ==
He died on 27 July 2018 due to pulmonary emphysema.

== Works ==
- Fáscinum. Ensayos sexológicos. Palabras preliminares de Carlos Alberto Seguín. Lima: Asociación de Estudios Humanísticos, 1972. 231 p. Contiene los ensayos Obscenidad, pornografía y censura y ¿Y qué fue realmente lo que hizo Onán?, más una Bibliografía en español sobre la obscenidad, la pornografía y la censura.
- ¿Y qué fue realmente lo que hizo Onán?; Lima: Kavia Kobaya Editores, 1996.
- Normalidad y anormalidad & El asesino desorganizado; Lima: Umbra, 2000. (ISBN 978-612-4050-56-5)
- De esto y de aquello; Lima: Universidad Ricardo Palma, 2006. (ISBN 9972-236-16-1)
- Hechos y opiniones acerca de la mujer; Lima: Editorial San Marcos, 2008. (ISBN 978-612-302-834-3)
- Cajonística y vallejística; Lima: Editorial San Marcos, 2009. (ISBN 978-9972-38-682-4)
- Miscelánea humanística; Lima, Perú: Fondo Editorial de la Universidad Inca Garcilaso de la Vega, 2010. (ISBN 978-612-4050-14-5)
- Lexicografía; Lima: Editorial San Marcos, 2011. (ISBN 978-612-302-421-5)
- Obscenidad y Pornografía; Lima, Perú: Fondo Editorial Universidad Inca Garcilaso de la Vega, 2012. (ISBN 978-612-4050-52-7)
- Esmórgasbord; Lima, Perú: Fondo Editorial de la Universidad Inca Garcilaso de la Vega, 2011. (ISBN 978-612-4050-28-2)
- La niña masturbación y su madrastra tabú; Lima, Perú: Fondo Editorial de la Universidad Inca Garcilaso de la Vega, 2015. (ISBN 978-612-4050-85-5)
- Poliantea; Lima, Perú: Fondo Editorial de la Universidad Inca Garcilaso de la Vega, 2014. (ISBN 978-612-4050-72-5)
- Polimatía; Lima, Perú: Fondo Editorial de la Universidad Inca Garcilaso de la Vega, 2014. (ISBN 978-612-4050-78-7)
- Arte y Ciencia en la Gallistica; Lima, Perú: Fondo Editorial de la Universidad Inca Garcilaso de la Vega, 2015. (ISBN 978-612-4050-92-3)
- Mixtifori; Lima, Perú: Fondo Editorial de la Universidad Inca Garcilaso de la Vega, 2017. (ISBN 978-612-4340-12-3)
