= Laurinda Hope Spear =

American architect

- Born: 23 August 1950; Rochester, MN, USA
- Occupations: Architect, landscape architect and designer
- Known for: Arquitectonica and ArquitectonicaGEO

Laurinda Hope Spear, FAIA, ASLA, LEED AP (born 1950) is an American architect and landscape architect based in Miami, Florida. She is one of the founders of Arquitectonica, the international architecture, planning, and interior design firm, which formed in 1977. In 2005, in order to further explore sustainable design principles, she co-founded ArquitectonicaGEO (ArqGEO), a landscape architecture, master planning and urban design firm.

== Early life ==
Spear was born in 1950. In 1968 she graduated from Everglades School and in 1972 received her Bachelor of Fine Arts from Brown University, where she was later a trustee for six years. She received her Master of Architecture from Columbia University in 1975 and a Master of Landscape Architecture from Florida International University in 2006. Spear was awarded the Rome Prize in Architecture in 1978. In 1992, she was made a Fellow of the American Institute of Architects. In 1999, she was inducted into the Interior Design Magazine Hall of Fame.

== Career ==
Spear co-founded Arquitectonica in 1977 with fellow architects Bernardo Fort-Brescia, Andres Duany, Elizabeth Plater-Zyberk, and Hervin Romney.

Spear made a contribution as an outside designer for The Modern Fan Company in 2000 before being released to the market in 2001. She brought her taste and creativity to their collection with the innovative glass fan, the "Whirlybird".

== Personal life ==
Spear is married to Bernardo Fort Brescia. They live and work in Coconut Grove, Florida.

== See Also ==
- List of American architects
