= Pedro Brescia Cafferata =

Peruvian businessman (1921–2014)

- Born: 31 August 1921
- Died: 21 December 2014 (aged 93)
- Education: National Agrarian University
- Occupation: Businessman
- Parent(s): Fortunato Brescia Tassano; María Catalina Cafferata Peñaranda
- Relatives: Mario Brescia Cafferata (brother); Ana Maria Brescia Cafferata (sister); Rosa Brescia Cafferata (sister); Alex Fort Brescia (nephew); Bernardo Fort Brescia (nephew)

Pedro Brescia Cafferata (31 August 1921 – 21 December 2014) was a Peruvian businessman. He was the co-chairman of Grupo Breca, a conglomerate founded by his father, and the president of BBVA Continental, a Peruvian bank.

== Early life ==
Pedro Brescia Cafferata was born on 31 August 1921. His father, Fortunato Brescia Tassano, was the Italian-born founder of Grupo Breca, a real estate company-turned-conglomerate. His mother, María Catalina Cafferata Peñaranda, was Peruvian. He had a brother and two sisters, all billionaires.

== Career ==
Brescia Cafferata managed Grupo Breca with his brother Mario. He was also the chairman of the insurance company Rímac Seguros, the bank BBVA Continental, and the fish company Tasa.

== Death ==
Brescia Cafferata died on 21 December 2014, at the age of 93.
