= BBVA Argentina =

Argentine bank

Coordinates: 34°36′21″S 58°22′19.5″W

Banco BBVA Argentina S.A.

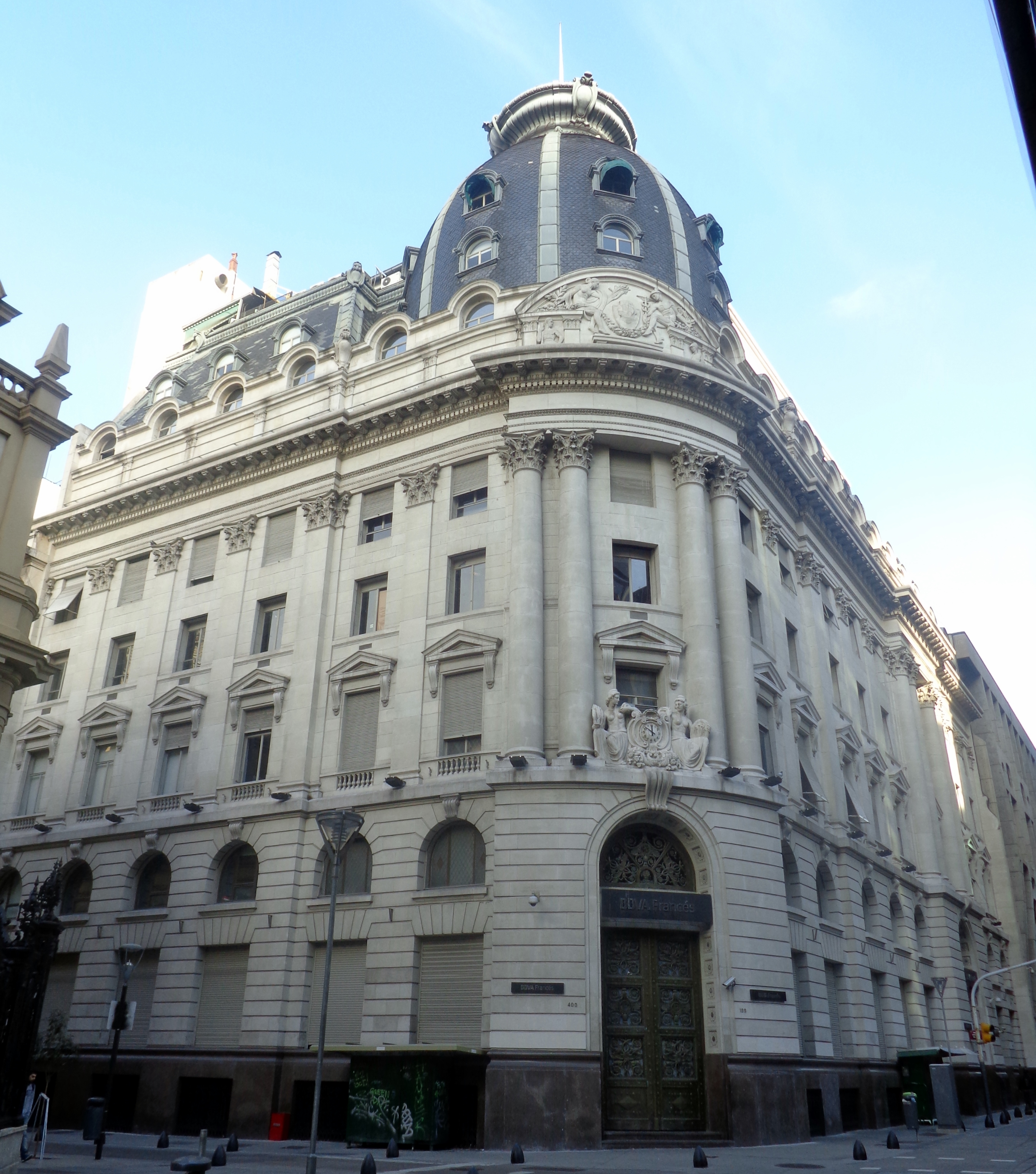
- Bank headquarters in Buenos Aires
- Type: Sociedad Anónima
- Traded as: BCBA: BBAR; NYSE: BBAR; BMAD: XBRF; MERVAL component
- Industry: Financial services
- Founded: 14 October 1886; 139 years ago
- Headquarters: Buenos Aires, Argentina
- Key people: Jorge Carlos Bledel (CEO)
- Products: Banking, Insurance
- Revenue: ▲US$ 2.1 billion (2025)
- Net income: US$ 197 million (2025)
- Total assets: US$ 18.7 billion (2025)
- Number of employees: 6,689 (2025)
- Parent: Banco Bilbao Vizcaya Argentaria
- Website: bbva.com.ar

BBVA Argentina, formerly BBVA Banco Francés, is a financial institution in Argentina.

== History ==
Founded on 14 October 1886, in Buenos Aires as Banco Francés del Río de la Plata (English: French Bank of the River Plate), it is the oldest private bank in Argentina. Its Beaux-Arts headquarters, designed by Jorge Bunge, were inaugurated in 1926.

Morgan Guaranty Trust acquired a 50% share in the bank in 1968, though the New York-based bank sold most of these to Alpargatas, a leading local industrial firm, a decade later.

Despite the nation's economic woes during the 1980s, the Banco Francés expanded from 15 branches to 62 during the decade, and entered into a joint venture with Bankers Trust Company in 1986. Alpargatas sold its stake to local developer Eduardo Constantini in 1991, and entered into a second joint venture with Merrill Lynch in 1992.

In December 1996, Spain's Banco Bilbao Vizcaya, (now Banco Bilbao Vizcaya Argentaria), acquired the 99.9% of the common shares of Otar S.R.L., which was a major shareholder of Sud América Inversiones S.A., and holder of over 30% of the capital of Banco Francés, hence the BBVA in its name.

The bank announced in 2013 it would relocate its headquarters to the Consultatio Tower, in the Catalinas Norte office park, upon the Tower's completion in 2015. In 2017, the bank once again relocated its headquarters in the newly built Torre BBVA.

In 2019, BBVA unified its brand worldwide and BBVA Francés was renamed BBVA.

In 2025, BBVA Argentina had 234 branches, 868 ATMs, and 890 ATSs across the country.

Recent historical research has emphasised that the success of BBVA’s expansion in Latin America depended not only on acquisitions but also on the integration of management practices and implementation of information technology across the region.
