= Mario Brescia Cafferata =

- Born: Mario Augusto Brescia Cafferata; September 25, 1929
- Died: May 16, 2013 (aged 83)
- Occupation: Businessman
- Parent(s): Fortunato Brescia Tassano; María Catalina Cafferata Peñaranda
- Relatives: Pedro Brescia Cafferata (brother); Ana Maria Brescia Cafferata (sister); Rosa Brescia Cafferata (sister); Alex Fort Brescia (nephew); Bernardo Fort Brescia (nephew)

Mario Brescia Cafferata (September 25, 1929 – May 16, 2013) was a Peruvian billionaire businessman. He was the co-chairman of Grupo Breca, a conglomerate founded by his father, and the president of BBVA Continental, a Peruvian bank.

== Early life ==
Mario Brescia Cafferata was born on September 25, 1929. His father, Fortunato Brescia Tassano, was an Italian-born real estate investor who founded Grupo Breca. He had a brother, Pedro Brescia Cafferata, and two sisters, Ana Maria Brescia Cafferata and Rosa Brescia Cafferata.

== Career ==
Brescia Cafferata managed Grupo Breca with his brother, Pedro Brescia Cafferata. He succeeded his brother as the president of BBVA Continental. Brescia Cafferata was the world's 831st richest person, with an estimated wealth of $1.8 billion in 2013. He served as President of the National Club from 2000 to 2002.

== Death and legacy ==
Brescia Cafferata died on May 16, 2013. His estate was inherited by his sons.
