= Fortunato Brescia Tassano =

Italian-Peruvian businessman

- Born: 1870; Italy
- Died: 1951 (aged 80–81)
- Occupation: Businessman
- Spouse: María Catalina Cafferata Peñaranda
- Children: Mario Brescia Cafferata; Pedro Brescia Cafferata; Ana Maria Brescia Cafferata; Rosa Brescia Cafferata
- Relatives: Alex Fort Brescia (grandson); Bernardo Fort Brescia (grandson)

Fortunato Brescia Tassano (died 1951) was an Italian-born Peruvian businessman who founded Grupo Breca, a real estate company-turned-conglomerate. He emigrated to Peru in 1889.
