= Grupo Breca =

Peruvian business conglomerate

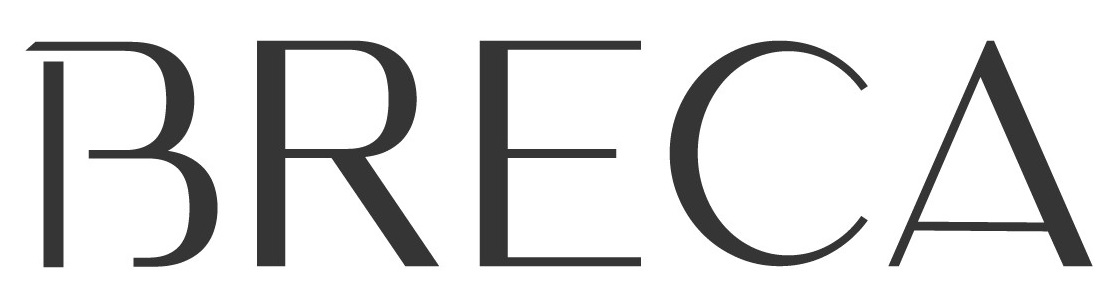
- Type: Privately held company
- Founder: Fortunato Brescia Tassano
- Headquarters: Lima, Peru
- Key people: Alex Fort Brescia (co-chairman); Pedro Brescia Moreyra (co-chairman); Ana Maria Brescia Cafferata; Rosa Brescia Cafferata; Mario Brescia Cafferata (formerly); Pedro Brescia Cafferata (formerly)

Grupo Breca, also known as Grupo Brescia, is a Peruvian business conglomerate founded more than 130 years ago with operations in Peru and other countries in Latin America. Fortunato Brescia and his wife, Mrs. María Catalina Cafferata, are the group's founders. Their last names Brescia and Cafferata gave rise to the "Breca" brand, which reflects the memory of its founders.

Since September 2011, its main companies are grouped in the Inversiones Breca S. A. holding company, which has as shareholders Ana María Brescia Cafferata, RBCF Inversiones, Pedro Brescia Moreyra, Mario Brescia Moreyra, Fortunato Brescia Moreyra and an RBCF trust. The Fort Brescia family is a shareholder in RBCF company.

== History ==
Fortunato Brescia Tassano began his working life as an assistant in a retail store. In 1913, he acquired the Miranaves Ranch, next to the Port of Callao, and started his own business to produce subsistence farming and dairy products and became the supplier of the warehouses. A couple of years later, he bought the Limatambo ranch, which includes part of the current districts of San Borja, San Isidro and Miraflores.

In 1919, Mr. Fortunato married María Cafferata Peñaranda. Their family decided to invest in Peru. In 1928, the Government of Augusto B. Leguía expropriated part of the Miranaves Ranch to build warehouses and residences for workers of the Port of Callao. In 1940, during the government of Manuel Prado Ugarteche, part of the Limatambo ranch was expropriated to build an airport in Lima. In 1946, despite the expropriation, the opportunities in the real estate market led to Mr. Fortunato to create the company Urbanizadora Jardín. In 1948, Mr. Fortunato developed his first real estate project: The Santa Marina residential area in Callao. In 1952, Mr. Fortunato died and his sons Pedro and Mario were left in charge of the businesses with the support and continued involvement of their sisters Rosa and Ana María. In the following years, the brothers consolidated the process of growth and diversification of the group by venturing into industries such as banking, fishing, insurance, health and mining.

Currently, the group is led by its co-chairmen, Alex Fort Brescia and Pedro Brescia Moreyra, and its directors, Rosa Brescia Cafferata, Ana Maria Brescia Cafferata, Fortunato Brescia Moreyra and Mario Brescia Moreyra.

== Development and diversification ==
Pedro Brescia Cafferata assumed control of the group when he was 31 years old, and Mario became his right arm when he turned 23 years old. Their sisters Ana María and Rosa were, at that time, 27 and 25 years, respectively, and although they were considered in the big decisions (by Pedro's mandate, everything was decided by consensus), they never got involved in the day-to-day business. Pedro and Mario decided to give strength to the real estate business, which is reflected in the title of the thesis made by Pedro: “How to lot a ranch for residential use?" This was focused on the lotting of the San Borja ranch.

Despite the push made in the real estate business, the brothers sought new opportunities and investments. They were admitted into the fishing business by acquiring the companies Tecnológica de Alimentos, Costa Mar and Indo Mar. In addition, their diversification led them to develop the mining business, so they took advantage of the quarries they inherited from their maternal grandfather, but his father Mr. Fortunato decided to close. They decided to reopen them, acquiring some new ones and creating Corporación Minera Patará.

In 1963, Pedro launched the San Borja residential area on part of the grounds of his ranch, and shortly after it would follow the Monterrico residential area. Both are today residential areas of modern Lima. In 1964, AESA was created, the first firm that would be in charge of the group's businesses, and the next year it entered into the Rímac shareholding, an important leap in its plan to diversify the group and learn from other entrepreneurs.

When everything seemed to be going well, the political power touched the group business. In 1968, the Military Government of General Juan Velasco Alvarado passed the Agrarian Reform Law that snatched their agricultural lands in the valleys of Supe, Huaura, Chincha, and the urban land expansion territories in the basins of the Surco and Ate rivers. However, their lands in south Limatambo, Valverde and Naranjal were not touched. In addition to these seizures, the Government in 1973 then decided to nationalize fishing activity and took control of Tecnológica de Alimentos, which by that time already had a share of 4% of the fishing activity in Peru.

This nationalization policy of the economy, although it meant a financial loss for the nascent Brescia group, it also opened the door to new opportunities since the Government had ordered that the industry, mining, banking and insurance, traditionally dominated by foreign capital, must necessarily have local partners. The foreign capital, on the other hand, could not have more than 20% of the shareholding in the companies dedicated to those sectors.

In this position, when foreign investors were forced to reduce their participation, the Brescia group acquired 4% of the Banco de Crédito del Perú company and 27% of the Banco de Lima company. In 1977, they would perform a similar operation and achieved major participation in the Minsur mining company. In parallel, they dabbled in the tourism sector when acquiring the hotels manager Intursa company. By the end of the seventies decade, the Brescia group acquired the Compañía Peruana de Pinturas (CPP) and the fabric factory La Unión.

== Present ==
After the death of the founder Fortunato Brescia Tassano, in 1952, the leadership of the group was in the hands of his eldest son, Pedro Brescia Cafferata, with the support of his brother Mario. The two daughters of the patriarch, Rosa and Ana María, although with a much lower profile, also participated in making decisions. Pedro and Mario took the reins until they reached old age and after their retirement (Mario died in 2013 and Pedro, who had retired a few years earlier, in 2014), the management was left in the hands of the third-generation of the family. Although the family tradition dictated that Pedro leaves the management to his eldest son, he had no offspring, so a process of transfer and development of family protocols began. Consequently, the current management of the group is in charge of a steering committee made up of four members of the third generation, who act by consensus and maintain the tradition of the founders." One of its subsidiaries, Tecnologica de Alimentos (TASA), is "one of the largest producers of fish meal in the world."

== Relevant companies ==
=== BBVA Perú ===
BBVA Perú is the second largest bank in Peru, with a network of 320 branches in the country. The Global Finance magazine named it as the Best Peruvian Bank. It is a joint investment between Breca and BBVA Spain, operated by the latter.

=== Rímac Seguros ===
Founded in 1896, Rímac Seguros y Reaseguros is the oldest insurance company in Peru and a leader in the Peruvian market.

=== Clínica Internacional ===
It is one of the main networks of clinics in Peru and was ranked 13 in Latin America, in the ranking of Best Hospitals and Clinics in Latin America of América Economía magazine.

=== Minsur ===
Minsur is the third world producer of tin, with a growing presence in copper and gold. The company works in social and environmental aspects in the places where it operates. Its main operations are located in the south of Peru.

=== Taboca ===
Breca acquired Taboca in 2008, and it is one of the main tin reserves in Brazil. In addition, it is the second producer of tantalum and the third producer of niobium in that country.

=== Marcobre ===
Currently, Marcobre is carrying out a copper project called Mina Justa located in Marcona, Ica. Commercial operations are expected to begin in 2021.

=== Raura ===
It is a polymetallic mining company in medium-scale mining. Its operations started in 1960, and is engaged in the exploration, exploitation and processing of zinc, silver, lead and copper. It is the sixth largest national producer of zinc and the fourth of lead. The mine is located in the Central Andes of Peru, in the Lauricocha Province, Department of Huánuco, at an altitude of 4300 to 4700 meters above the sea level. Zinc is the most produced mineral.

=== AESA ===
It renders specialized mining and infrastructure services for underground operation. It has more than 25 years of experience in the development of conventional and mechanized mining projects. With more than 130 underground mining machines, more than 95,000 metrical tons of tunnels are dug per year.

=== TASA ===
It is the largest fishing company in Peru and the world's largest producer of fishmeal and fish oil. Its products are sold in more than 50 countries and comply with quality and sustainability controls.

=== Urbanova ===
It manages the real estate assets of Breca. It focuses on the development of commercial real estate and main offices, and optimizes the assets owned by the group. Among its achievements are the most modern main office buildings in the country, a sector in which Breca is a leader. It also has a commercial division that operates shopping centers.

=== Qroma ===
Paints and coatings company in Peru. It has the second largest manufacturing facility for paints and adhesives in South America. The company operates with 14 business units and ten different trademarks.

=== Intursa ===
The group's hotel operation has a presence throughout Peru, such as in Cusco, Lima, the Valle Sagrado in Urubamba and the coastal town of Paracas. The company operates through the Westin, JW Marriot and Luxury Collection (in alliance with Starwood) trademarks in Lima, as well as in selected locations in Cusco, Urubamba and Paracas. In addition, it has an Aloft and an AC Hotels in Lima.

=== Cemento Melón ===
Melón is a leading construction materials company in Chile, with three business units: cement, concrete and aggregates.

=== Corporación Breca ===
Based on an integrated global vision, the Corporate Center manages the portfolio of the group to maximize its value and its potential. Also, it manages asset allocation and its strategies, and participates in the analysis and the most relevant transactions.

=== Centria ===
It is the Shared Services Center of Breca.

=== Aporta ===
It is the social innovation platform of Breca and its business units. It works with them to add value to their sustainability initiatives and to maximize their social impact on their respective stakeholders, through social innovation processes.

=== Brein ===
It is the innovation hub of Breca. It was launched in 2017 to harness and develop the potential for innovation within the ecosystem of the group.

== Others ==
- Aporta Desarrollo Sostenible Asociación Civil
- Urbanova Inmobiliaria S. A. C.
- Centria Servicios Administrativos S. A
- Estratégica S. A. C.
- AESA Infraestructura y Minería (Administración de Empresas S. A. C.)
- Qroma S. A
- Funsur S. A.
- Minsur S.A.
- Compañía Minera Raura S. A
- Bodegas Viñas de Oro
- Tricolor S. A.
- Cubica
- Marcobre S. A. C.
