= Giovanni Maria da Brescia =

Italian painter

Fra Giovanni Maria da Brescia was an Italian painter of the Renaissance period.

Fresco by Giovanni Maria da Brescia of Madonna with the Saints Rochus and Christopher in the Christ Monastery church in Brescia.

He was born in Brescia circa 1460. He appears to have been related to Giovanni Antonio da Brescia. He was brought up a goldsmith, a profession at that time connected with the arts; and after studying painting and engraving for some time, he became a monk of the order of the Carmelites at Brescia, and painted circa 1500 several pictures for the church of his monastery, and in the cloister some frescoes, representing subjects from the history of Elijah and Elisha. He also engraved some plates, which are executed in a mixture of the styles of Marcantonio Raimondi and Andrea Mantegna. We have the following plates :

- Virgin and Infant Jesus, the Virgin holding a Book.
- Virgin and Infant in the Clouds; a circular plate.
- St. Gregory resuscitating a Youth (signed, 1502)
- The Justice of Emperor Trajan (signed, 1502)
- Three Monks of the Order of the Carmelites. (1512).
