= Arquitectonica =

International architecture, landscape architecture and interior design firm

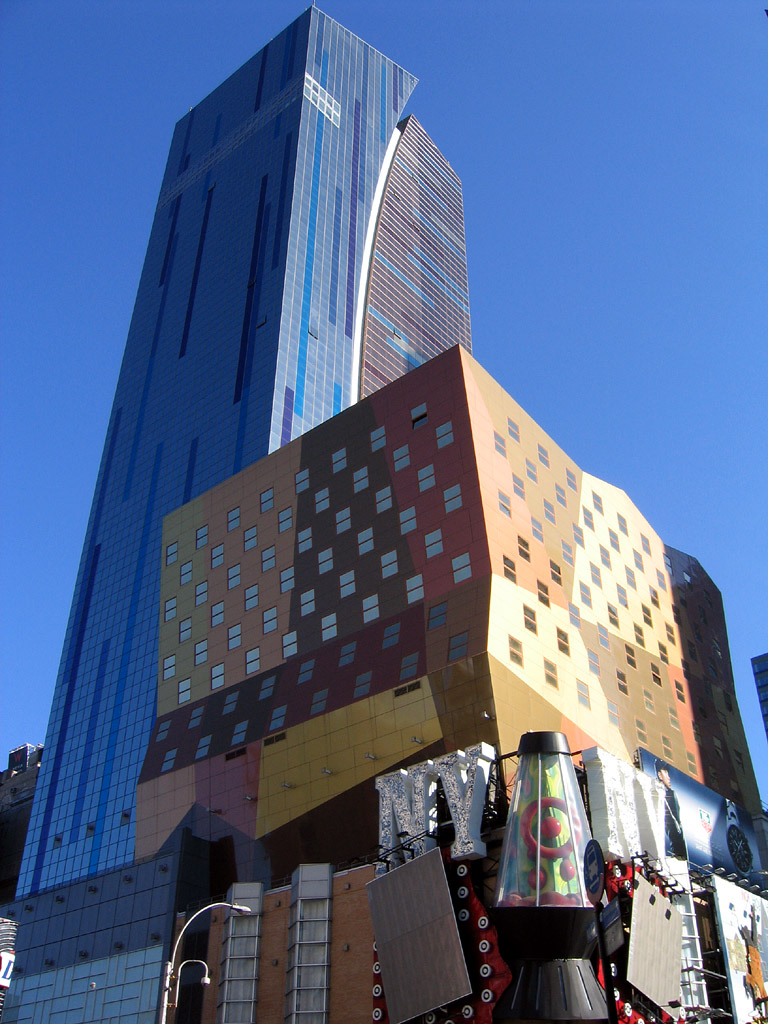
Westin Times Square Hotel in New York

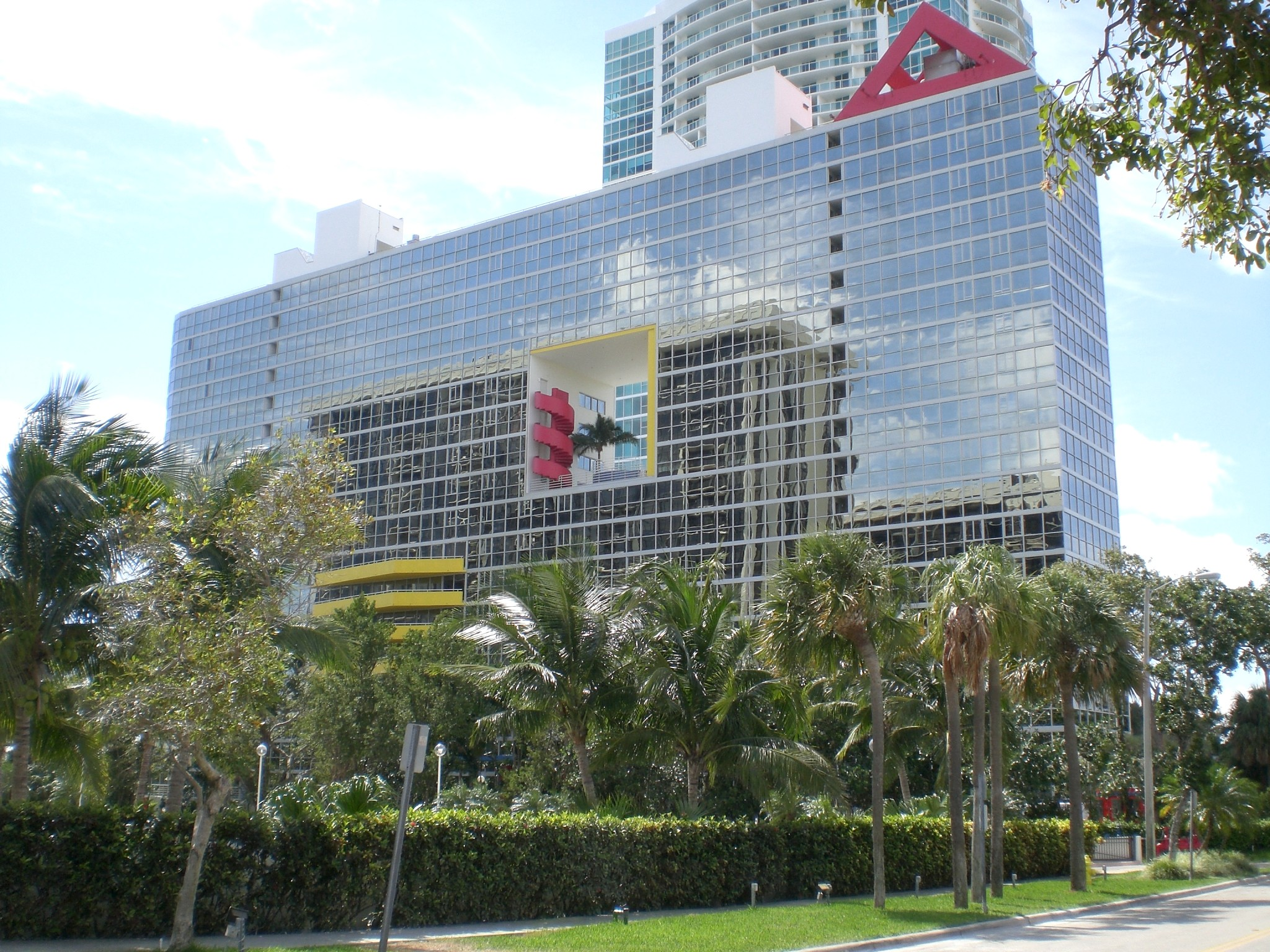
Atlantis Condominium in Miami, seen prominently in Miami Vice

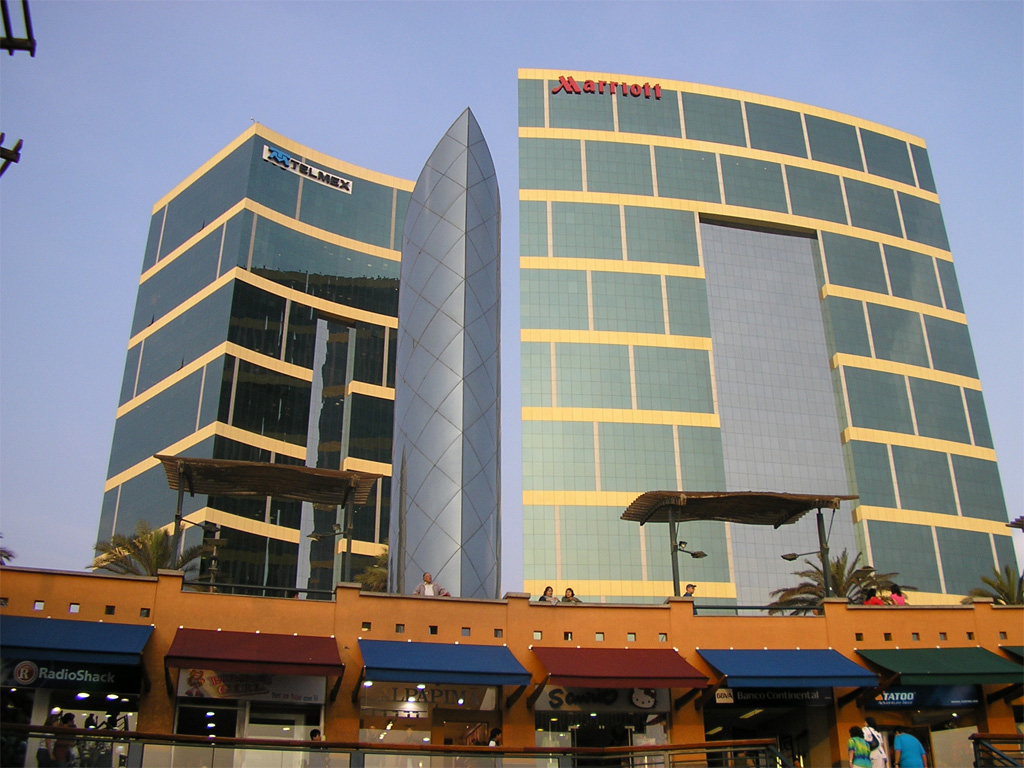
The Lima Marriott Hotel is one of the many projects the firm has in Peru

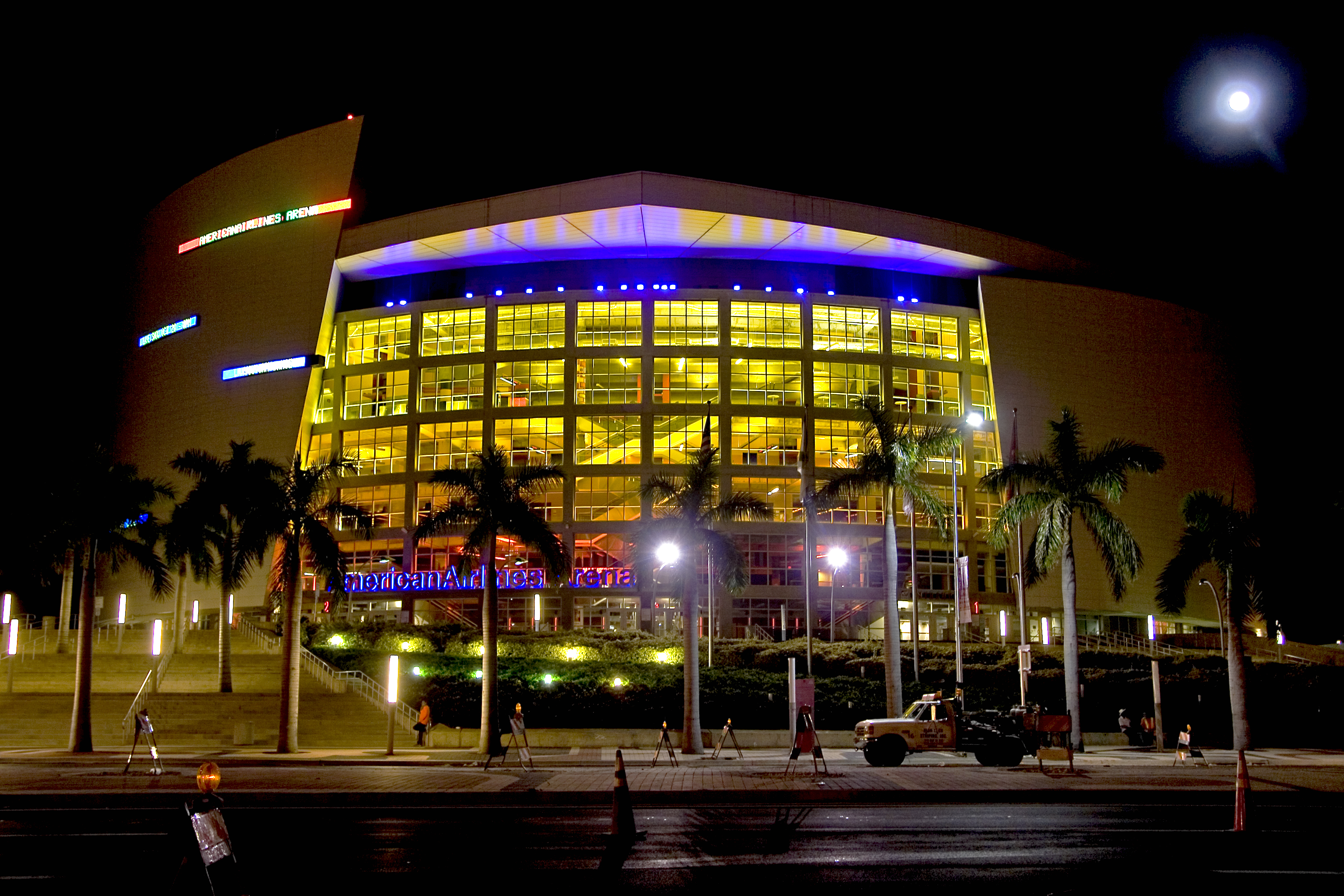
Kaseya Center in Miami

Arquitectonica is an international architecture, landscape architecture, interior design, and urban planning design firm headquartered in Miami, Florida’s Coconut Grove neighborhood. The firm is known for surface patterning and facade articulation. Arquitectonica began in 1977 as an experimental studio founded by Peruvian architect Bernardo Fort-Brescia, Laurinda Hope Spear, Andrés Duany, Elizabeth Plater-Zyberk, and Hervin Romney. The firm is led by Bernardo Fort-Brescia and Laurinda Hope Spear.

Until 2010, Arquitectonica's headquarters were in Downtown Miami, until their new offices at 2900 Oak Avenue in the Coconut Grove neighborhood of Miami were opened in 2010.

== Works and projects ==
In June 2011, two projects were announced for Arquitectonica, both in Downtown Miami: the new $700 million Brickell City Centre project in Miami's Brickell neighborhood, and the $3-billion Genting Resorts World Miami project in Miami's Arts & Entertainment District neighborhood.

== Future projects ==
- Miami Beach Convention Center
- Nu Stadium
- JW Marriott Nashville
