= Bernardo Fort Brescia =

American architect

Bernardo Fort-Brescia
- Born: Lima, Peru
- Education: Princeton University; Harvard University
- Occupation: Architect
- Spouse: Laurinda Hope Spear
- Awards: American Institute of Architects Silver Medal

Bernardo Fort-Brescia is a US-based Peruvian businessman and architect. He is the co-founder of the architectural firm Arquitectonica. He is a fellow of the American Institute of Architects (AIA). He won the AIA Silver Medal. He is also an heir to Grupo Breca.

== Early life ==
Bernardo Fort-Brescia was born in Lima, Peru on November 19, 1951 into the Brescia family. His Italian-born grandfather, Fortunato Brescia Tassano, founded Grupo Breca, a real estate company-turned-conglomerate. His mother, Rosa Brescia Cafferata, is a billionaire heiress. His brother Alex Fort Brescia, is a businessman.

Fort-Brescia studied architecture and urban planning at Princeton University and obtained his master's degree in architecture from Harvard University.

With his brother, Fort-Brescia manages his mother's investments in Grupo Breca, their family conglomerate.

== Selected projects ==
- Bronx Museum of the Arts, Bronx, New York
- Atlantis Condominium, Miami, Florida
- Brickell City Centre, Miami, Florida
- Grand Hyatt San Antonio, San Antonio, Texas
- The Infinity, San Francisco, California
- Philips Arena, Atlanta, Georgia
- City of Dreams (casino) Resort, Macau, China
- TaiKoo Hui, Guangzhou
- International Finance Center, Seoul, South Korea
- SMX Convention Center, Pasay, Manila
- Festival Walk, Kowloon Tong, Kowloon
- Icon Brickell, Miami, Florida
- PortMiami Tunnel, Miami, Florida
- Jorge Chavez International Airport, Lima, Peru
- Port of Xiamen Cruise Ship Terminals and Mixed-use Development, Xiamen, China
- Microsoft European Headquarters, Paris, France
- University of Miami School of Architecture Design Studio, Coral Gables, Florida
- University of Miami Donna E. Shalala Student Center, Coral Gables, Florida
- University of Miami Student Housing Village, Coral Gables, Florida
- Florida International University School of International and Public Affairs, Miami, Florida
- United States Embassy, Lima, Peru
- Mandarin Oriental Hotel, Shanghai, China
- Whirlpool U.S. Headquarters, Benton, Michigan
- Cyberport Technology Campus and Le Meridien Hotel, Hong Kong, China
- Miami City Ballet, Miami Beach, Florida
- American Airlines Arena, Miami, Florida
- High School for Construction Trades, Engineering and Architecture, New York, New York
- Westin New York at Times Square, New York, New York
- SLS Lux Brickell Hotel and Residences, Miami, Florida
- Lake Nona Town Center Hotel, Orlando, Florida
- South Miami-Dade Cultural Arts Center, Miami, Florida
- Gulfshore Playhouse, Naples, Florida
- Banco de Credito del Peru Headquarters, Lima, Peru

== Exhibitions ==
- City of Culture: New Architecture for the Arts, New York, New York
- Pratt Institute 50 Years of Record Houses, New York, New York
- Exposition Cité de l'Architecture, Paris, France
- Municipal Art Society, New York, New York
- The Skyscraper Museum, New York, New York
- The Chicago Athenaeum Museum of Architecture and Design, Chicago, Italy and Greece
- Urban Land Institute, Miami Beach, Florida
- Cooper-Hewitt National Design Museum, Smithsonian Institution, New York
- Smith College Art Gallery
- The Sixth International Venice Architecture Biennale, Venice, Italy
- Phillipe Uzzan, Paris
- Gallery MA, Tokyo, Japan
- Centrum voor Architectuur en Stedebouw, Brussels, Belgium
- Stadt Frankfurt am Main, Frankfurt, Germany
- Architekturforum, Zurich, Switzerland
- Ontvangsthal Veldkamp, Raalte, Netherlands
- Galerie Westersingel 8, Rotterdam, Netherlands
- Gemeente Bibliotheek, Middelburg, Netherlands
- Arc en Reve, Bordeaux, France
- Bass Museum, Miami Beach, Florida
- Institut Francais d’ Architecture (IFA), Paris, France
- Bienal de Buenos Aires
- Institute of Contemporary Art, Philadelphia, Pennsylvania
- Bienale de Paris, France
- Yale University, “Young Architects”, New Haven, Connecticut

== Lectures and jury panels ==
- University of Miami Real Estate Impact Conference “Global Urban Design and Miami 2020”
- Perspective Architecture Awards Judging Panel
- Head Juror, American Institute of Architects Columbus Design Awards
- American Institute of Architects National Convention Presentation, “Miami: Public Buildings for Urban Regeneration”
- MIPIM Lecture Panel “My Architect(s): Genuine visions to address global cities challenges / Berlin-*London-Los Angeles-New York-Paris-Rotterdam-Seoul-Tokyo”
- Council on Tall Buildings and Urban Habitat (CTBUH) Conference, Mumbai - “Remaking of Sustainable Cities in the Vertical Age” - Cities Within Cities
- Keynote Speaker at MUDD (Mixed-use Design Development) Asia
- Abu Dhabi, Cityscape Green & Sustainable Design Discussion Panel
- Abu Dhabi CityScape, National Exhibition Centre “Is Sustainability Cost Effective?”
- Ohio Construction Conference: “Design Review” - The Builders Exchange of Central Ohio
- Urban Land Institute Stararchitects Working on the Las Vegas Strip, Las Vegas, Nevada
- American Institute of Architects Academy of Architecture for Justice Sustainable Justice 6th International Conference on Courthouse Design, New York, New York
- Buenos Aires Bienal, Buenos Aires, Argentina
- National Building Museum: Honor Award - Salute to The Related Companies / The Related Group, Washington DC
- American Institute of Architects New York Chapter Architecture Inside/Out Housing Committee and The American Planning Association's New York Metro Chapter Waterfront Committee: New Waterfront Housing
- World Architecture Congress at Cityscape China: Emotion and Reason: Architecture in the age of Social and Environmental Responsibility, from Shelter to Architecture, Shanghai, China
- San Francisco Real Estate Brokers: New Trends in Residential Building Design, San Francisco, California
