= Rosa Brescia Cafferata =

Peruvian heiress and philanthropist

- Born: c. 1926
- Occupation(s): Investor, philanthropist
- Spouse: Paul Fort (dead)
- Children: 2 sons (Alex Fort Brescia and Bernardo Fort Brescia), 3 daughters
- Parent(s): Fortunato Brescia Tassano; María Catalina Cafferata Peñaranda
- Relatives: Mario Brescia Cafferata (brother); Pedro Brescia Cafferata (brother); Ana Maria Brescia Cafferata (sister)

Rosa Brescia Cafferata (born c. 1926) is a Peruvian billionaire heiress and philanthropist. With her children, she owns 30% of Grupo Breca, a conglomerate founded by her Italian-born father. She is the president of the Peruvian Center for Hearing, Language and Learning (CPAL).
